= David Fenyves =

Canadian ice hockey player

- Born: April 29, 1960 (age 65) Dunnville, Ontario, Canada
- Height: 5 ft 11 in (180 cm)
- Weight: 190 lb (86 kg; 13 st 8 lb)
- Position: Defence
- Shot: Left
- Played for: Buffalo Sabres; Philadelphia Flyers
- NHL draft: Undrafted
- Playing career: 1980–1993

David Alan Fenyves (born April 29, 1960) is a Canadian former professional ice hockey defenceman who played in the National Hockey League (NHL) for the Buffalo Sabres and Philadelphia Flyers.

== Playing career ==
Fenyves was born in Dunnville, Ontario. He went undrafted following his junior hockey career with the Peterborough Petes of the Ontario Hockey League, where he compiled 85 points and 250 penalty minutes in 191 games and was part of their Memorial Cup championship team in 1979. Fenyves signed with the Buffalo Sabres entering the 1980–1981 season, and spent most of the next four seasons with their AHL affiliate, the Rochester Americans.

Fenyves became a full-time NHL'er during the 1984/85 season, playing in 107 games and notching 16 points in the next two seasons with the Sabres. Fenyves returned to Rochester for the 1986–1987 season, where he helped the Americans to the Calder Cup championship. During the playoff run, Fenyves compiled 15 points in 18 games and was awarded the Jack A. Butterfield Trophy as the playoffs' Most Valuable Player.

The following season, Fenyves signed with the Philadelphia Flyers, where he spent the majority of the next six seasons with their AHL affiliate, the Hershey Bears before retiring after the 1992–1993 season. Following the 1987–88 and 1988–89 seasons, Fenyves was awarded the Eddie Shore Award as the AHL's best defenceman, as voted on by the AHL media and players.

For his career, Fenyves played in 206 National Hockey League games (148 with the Buffalo Sabres and 58 with the Philadelphia Flyers), totaling 35 points and 119 penalty minutes, and appeared in 11 games with the Buffalo Sabres in the NHL playoffs.

In 2004, Fenyves was inducted into the Rochester Americans Hall of Fame.

In 2017, "Fenway" was inducted into the sixth class of the Hershey Bears Hall of Fame.

== Awards ==
- Jack A. Butterfield Trophy (most valuable player in Calder Cup (American Hockey League) playoffs): 1986–87 season
- Eddie Shore Award (best defenceman in the AHL): 1987–88
- Eddie Shore Award (best defenceman in the AHL): 1988–89

== Career statistics ==
=== Regular season and playoffs ===
			Regular season					Playoffs
Season	Team	League	GP	G	A	Pts	PIM	GP	G	A	Pts	PIM
1976–77	Dunnville Jr. Mudcats	NDJCHL	46	10	21	31	52	—	—	—	—	—
1977–78	Peterborough Petes	OMJHL	59	3	12	15	36	21	1	1	2	19
1977–78	Peterborough Petes	MC	—	—	—	—	—	5	0	1	1	0
1978–79	Peterborough Petes	OMJHL	66	2	23	25	122	19	0	5	5	18
1978–79	Peterborough Petes	MC	—	—	—	—	—	5	0	0	0	0
1979–80	Peterborough Petes	OMJHL	66	9	36	45	92	14	0	3	3	14
1980–81	Rochester Americans	AHL	77	6	16	22	146	—	—	—	—	—
1981–82	Rochester Americans	AHL	73	3	14	17	68	5	0	1	1	4
1982–83	Buffalo Sabres	NHL	24	0	8	8	14	4	0	0	0	0
1982–83	Rochester Americans	AHL	51	2	19	21	45	—	—	—	—	—
1983–84	Buffalo Sabres	NHL	10	0	4	4	9	2	0	0	0	7
1983–84	Rochester Americans	AHL	70	3	16	19	55	16	1	4	5	22
1984–85	Buffalo Sabres	NHL	60	1	8	9	27	5	0	0	0	2
1984–85	Rochester Americans	AHL	9	0	3	3	8	—	—	—	—	—
1985–86	Buffalo Sabres	NHL	47	0	7	7	37	—	—	—	—	—
1986–87	Buffalo Sabres	NHL	7	1	0	1	0	—	—	—	—	—
1986–87	Rochester Americans	AHL	71	6	16	22	57	18	3	12	15	10
1987–88	Philadelphia Flyers	NHL	5	0	0	0	0	—	—	—	—	—
1987–88	Hershey Bears	AHL	75	11	40	51	47	12	1	8	9	10
1988–89	Philadelphia Flyers	NHL	1	0	1	1	0	—	—	—	—	—
1988–89	Hershey Bears	AHL	79	15	51	66	41	12	2	6	8	6
1989–90	Philadelphia Flyers	NHL	12	0	0	0	4	—	—	—	—	—
1989–90	Hershey Bears	AHL	66	6	37	43	57	—	—	—	—	—
1990–91	Philadelphia Flyers	NHL	40	1	4	5	28	—	—	—	—	—
1990–91	Hershey Bears	AHL	29	4	11	15	13	7	0	3	3	6
1991–92	Hershey Bears	AHL	68	4	24	28	29	6	1	1	2	10
1992–93	Hershey Bears	AHL	42	3	11	14	14	—	—	—	—	—
AHL totals			710	63	258	321	580	76	8	35	43	68
NHL totals			206	3	32	35	119	11	0	0	0	9

=== International ===
Year	Team	Event	GP	G	A	Pts	PIM
1980	Canada	WJC	5	0	0	0	8

Preceded by Tim Tookey	Winner of the Jack A. Butterfield Trophy; 1986–87	Succeeded by Wendell Young
Preceded by Brad Shaw	Winner of the Eddie Shore Award; 1987–88 & 1988–89	Succeeded by Eric Weinrich
