= Mitch Lamoureux =

Canadian ice hockey player

- Born: August 22, 1962 (age 63) Ottawa, Ontario, Canada
- Height: 5 ft 6 in (168 cm)
- Weight: 185 lb (84 kg; 13 st 3 lb)
- Position: Centre
- Shot: Left
- Played for: Pittsburgh Penguins; Philadelphia Flyers; Asiago; Zell am See EK; HC Alleghe
- National team: Canada
- NHL draft: 154th overall, 1981; Pittsburgh Penguins
- Playing career: 1982–1999

Mitch Lamoureux (born August 22, 1962) is a Canadian former professional ice hockey player. He played 73 games in the National Hockey League with the Pittsburgh Penguins and Philadelphia Flyers from 1983 to 1988. The rest of his career, which lasted from 1982 to 1999, was spent in the minor leagues and in Europe.

== Biography ==
Lamoureux was born in Ottawa, Ontario, but grew up in Nepean, Ontario. He played in the NHL with the Pittsburgh Penguins and Philadelphia Flyers. He was inducted into the AHL Hall of Fame in the class of 2011.

He was later employed by PA Central Credit Union as Director of Business Development.

== Career statistics ==
=== Regular season and playoffs ===
			Regular season					Playoffs
Season	Team	League	GP	G	A	Pts	PIM	GP	G	A	Pts	PIM
1979–80	Oshawa Generals	OHA	67	28	48	76	63	—	—	—	—	—
1980–81	Oshawa Generals	OHL	63	50	69	119	256	—	—	—	—	—
1981–82	Oshawa Generals	OHL	66	43	78	121	275	12	4	17	21	68
1982–83	Baltimore Skipjacks	AHL	80	57	50	107	107	—	—	—	—	—
1983–84	Pittsburgh Penguins	NHL	8	1	1	2	6	—	—	—	—	—
1983–84	Baltimore Skipjacks	AHL	68	30	38	68	136	9	1	3	4	2
1984–85	Pittsburgh Penguins	NHL	62	10	8	18	53	—	—	—	—	—
1984–85	Baltimore Skipjacks	AHL	18	10	14	24	34	—	—	—	—	—
1985–86	Baltimore Skipjacks	AHL	75	22	31	53	129	—	—	—	—	—
1986–87	Hershey Bears	AHL	78	43	46	89	122	5	1	2	3	8
1987–88	Philadelphia Flyers	NHL	3	0	0	0	0	—	—	—	—	—
1987–88	Hershey Bears	AHL	78	35	52	87	171	12	9	7	16	48
1988–89	Hershey Bears	AHL	9	9	7	16	14	9	1	4	5	14
1988–89	Asiago	ITA	8	9	8	17	16	—	—	—	—	—
1989–90	SC Lyss	NLB	36	29	30	59	83	—	—	—	—	—
1989–90	Maine Mariners	AHL	10	4	7	11	10	—	—	—	—	—
1989–90	Canadian National Team	Intl	4	1	2	3	6	—	—	—	—	—
1990–91	SC Lyss	NLB	35	31	25	56	126	—	—	—	—	—
1991–92	Zell am See EK	AUT	42	36	44	80	63	—	—	—	—	—
1991–92	HC Alleghe	ITA	2	1	3	4	0	9	11	8	19	12
1992–93	San Diego Gulls	IHL	71	28	39	67	130	4	0	0	0	11
1993–94	Hershey Bears	AHL	80	45	60	105	92	11	3	4	7	26
1994–95	Hershey Bears	AHL	76	39	46	85	112	6	0	2	2	8
1995–96	Providence Bruins	AHL	63	22	29	51	62	4	2	3	5	2
1996–97	Providence Bruins	AHL	75	25	29	54	70	3	0	0	0	4
1997–98	Hershey Bears	AHL	22	4	9	13	22	7	2	4	6	12
1997–98	B.C. Icemen	UHL	16	18	15	33	10	—	—	—	—	—
1998–99	Hershey Bears	AHL	70	19	34	53	58	4	1	2	3	4
AHL totals			802	364	446	810	1158	70	20	31	51	128
NHL totals			73	11	9	20	59	—	—	—	—	—
