= Brian Dobbin =

Canadian ice hockey player (born 1966)

- Born: August 18, 1966 (age 58); Petrolia, Ontario, Canada
- Height: 6 ft 1 in (185 cm)
- Weight: 205 lb (93 kg; 14 st 9 lb)
- Position: Right wing
- Shot: Right
- Played for: Philadelphia Flyers; Boston Bruins
- NHL draft: 100th overall, 1984; Philadelphia Flyers
- Playing career: 1986–1999

Brian John Dobbin (born August 18, 1966) is a Canadian former professional ice hockey player. He played in 63 National Hockey League (NHL) games with the Philadelphia Flyers and Boston Bruins between 1986 and 1992. The rest of his career, which lasted from 1986 to 1999, was spent in various minor leagues.

== Career statistics ==
=== Regular season and playoffs ===
			Regular season					Playoffs
Season	Team	League	GP	G	A	Pts	PIM	GP	G	A	Pts	PIM
1980–81	Mooretown Flags	GLJCHL	38	21	17	38	14	—	—	—	—	—
1981–82	Mooretown Flags	GLJCHL	38	31	24	55	50	—	—	—	—	—
1982–83	Kingston Canadiens	OHL	69	16	39	55	35	—	—	—	—	—
1983–84	London Knights	OHL	70	30	40	70	70	—	—	—	—	—
1984–85	London Knights	OHL	53	42	57	99	63	8	7	4	11	2
1985–86	London Knights	OHL	59	38	55	93	113	5	2	1	3	9
1985–86	Hershey Bears	AHL	2	1	0	1	0	18	5	5	10	21
1986–87	Philadelphia Flyers	NHL	12	2	1	3	14	—	—	—	—	—
1986–87	Hershey Bears	AHL	52	26	35	61	66	5	4	2	6	15
1987–88	Philadelphia Flyers	NHL	21	3	5	8	6	2	0	0	0	17
1987–88	Hershey Bears	AHL	54	36	47	83	58	12	7	8	15	15
1988–89	Philadelphia Flyers	NHL	14	0	1	1	8	2	0	0	0	17
1988–89	Hershey Bears	AHL	59	43	48	91	61	11	7	6	13	12
1989–90	Philadelphia Flyers	NHL	9	1	1	2	11	—	—	—	—	—
1989–90	Hershey Bears	AHL	68	38	47	85	58	—	—	—	—	—
1990–91	Hershey Bears	AHL	80	35	43	78	82	7	1	2	3	7
1991–92	Boston Bruins	NHL	7	1	0	1	22	—	—	—	—	—
1991–92	New Haven Nighthawks	AHL	33	16	21	37	20	—	—	—	—	—
1991–92	Maine Mariners	AHL	33	21	15	36	14	—	—	—	—	—
1992–93	Milwaukee Admirals	IHL	80	39	45	84	50	6	4	3	7	6
1993–94	Milwaukee Admirals	IHL	81	48	53	101	73	4	1	0	1	4
1994–95	Milwaukee Admirals	IHL	76	21	40	61	62	9	0	4	4	2
1995–96	Cincinnati Cyclones	IHL	82	28	37	65	97	17	2	2	4	14
1996–97	Austin Ice Bats	WCHL	23	14	18	32	25	6	2	5	7	11
1996–97	Muskegon Fury	CoHL	2	0	0	0	2	—	—	—	—	—
1996–97	Grand Rapids Griffins	IHL	29	4	5	9	39	—	—	—	—	—
1997–98	Port Huron Border Cats	UHL	71	38	46	84	54	4	2	1	3	2
1998–99	Port Huron Border Cats	UHL	21	10	13	23	16	7	0	0	0	0
2003–04	Aylmer Blues	OHA Sr	9	3	4	7	31	—	—	—	—	—
2004–05	Aylmer Blues	OHA Sr	7	3	1	4	2	—	—	—	—	—
AHL totals			381	216	256	472	359	53	24	23	47	70
NHL totals			63	7	8	15	61	2	0	0	0	17
