= Louis A. R. Pieri Memorial Award =

Ice hockey award

The Louis A. R. Pieri Memorial Award is an American Hockey League (AHL) trophy awarded annually to the most outstanding coach during the season, as voted upon by members of the AHL media.

The award is named for Louis Pieri, a long-time contributor to the AHL as owner of the Providence Reds.

== Award winners ==
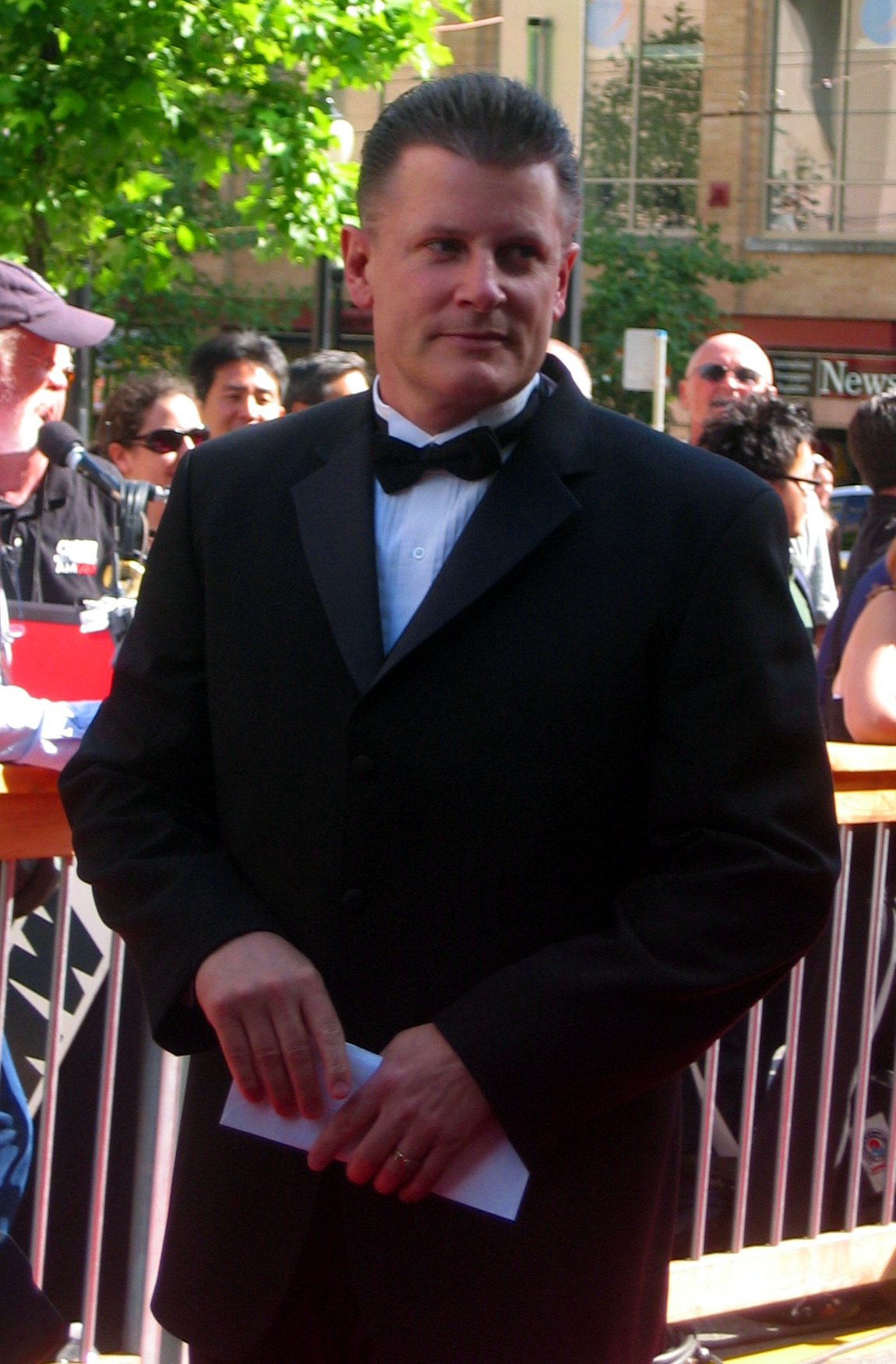
Marc Crawford was a winner in 1993, with the St. John's Maple Leafs.

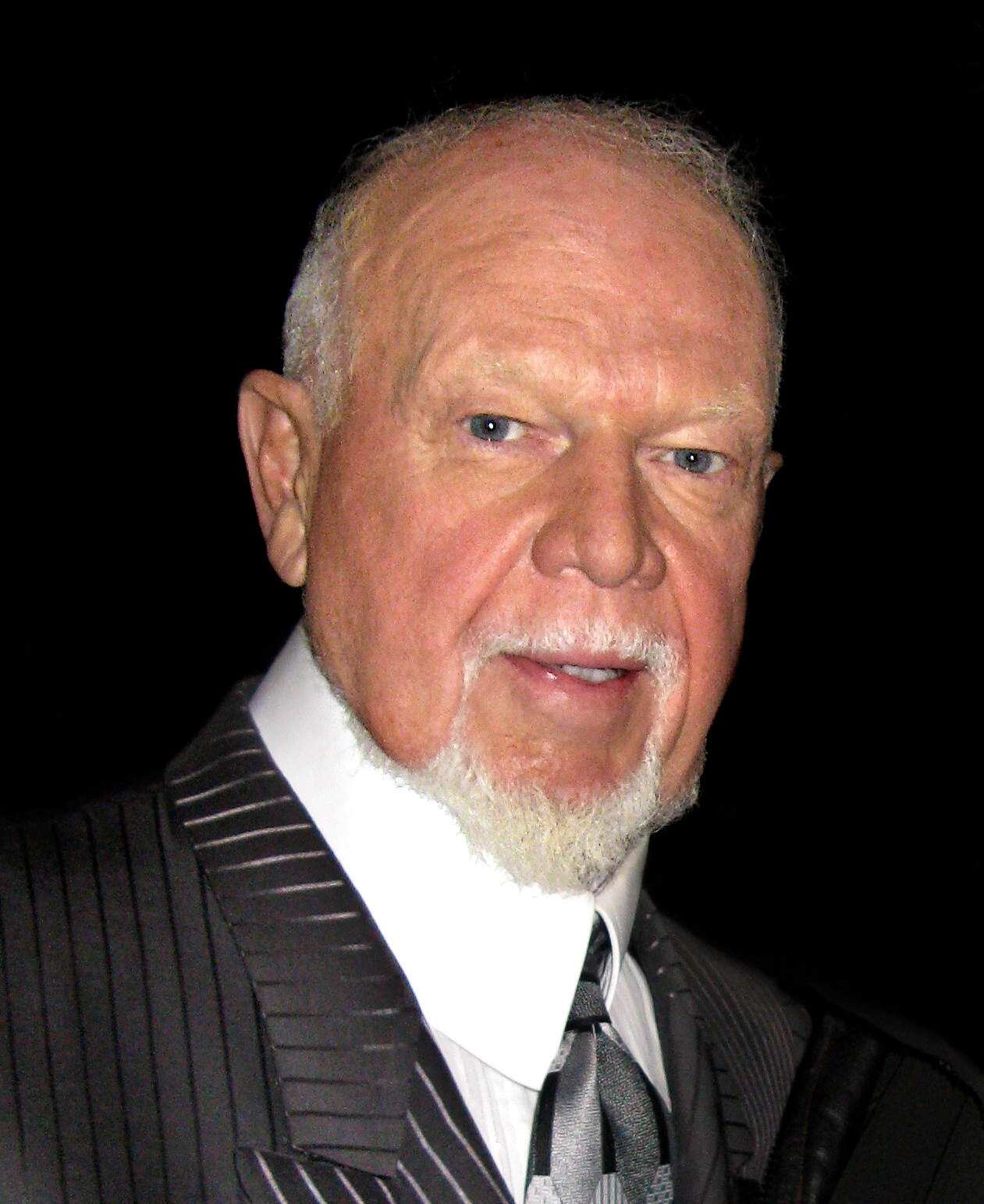
Don Cherry won the Pieri Award in 1974, also with Rochester.

Season	Coach	Team
1967–68	Vic Stasiuk	Quebec Aces
1968–69	Frank Mathers	Hershey Bears
1969–70	Fred Shero	Buffalo Bisons
1970–71	Terry Reardon	Baltimore Clippers
1971–72	Al MacNeil (1)	Nova Scotia Voyageurs
1972–73	Floyd Smith	Cincinnati Swords
1973–74	Don Cherry	Rochester Americans
1974–75	John Muckler	Providence Reds
1975–76	Chuck Hamilton	Hershey Bears
1976–77	Al MacNeil (2)	Nova Scotia Voyageurs
1977–78	Bob McCammon (1)	Maine Mariners
1978–79	Parker MacDonald	New Haven Nighthawks
1979–80	Doug Gibson	Hershey Bears
1980–81	Bob McCammon (2)	Maine Mariners
1981–82	Larry Kish	Binghamton Whalers
1982–83	Jacques Demers	Fredericton Express
1983–84	Gene Ubriaco	Baltimore Skipjacks
1984–85	Bill Dineen (1)	Adirondack Red Wings
1985–86	Bill Dineen (2)	Adirondack Red Wings
1986–87	Larry Pleau	Binghamton Whalers
1987–88	John Paddock	Hershey Bears
1987–88	Mike Milbury	Maine Mariners
1988–89	Tom McVie	Utica Devils
1989–90	Jim Roberts	Springfield Indians
1990–91	Don Lever	Rochester Americans
1991–92	Doug Carpenter	New Haven Nighthawks
1992–93	Marc Crawford	St. John's Maple Leafs
1993–94	Barry Trotz	Portland Pirates
1994–95	Robbie Ftorek (1)	Albany River Rats
1995–96	Robbie Ftorek (2)	Albany River Rats
1996–97	Greg Gilbert	Worcester IceCats
1997–98	Bill Stewart	Saint John Flames
1998–99	Peter Laviolette	Providence Bruins
1999–00	Glen Hanlon	Portland Pirates
2000–01	Don Granato	Worcester IceCats
2001–02	Bruce Cassidy	Grand Rapids Griffins
2002–03	Claude Julien	Hamilton Bulldogs
2002–03	Geoff Ward	Hamilton Bulldogs
2003–04	Claude Noel	Milwaukee Admirals
2004–05	Randy Cunneyworth	Rochester Americans
2005–06	Kevin Dineen	Portland Pirates
2006–07	Mike Haviland	Norfolk Admirals
2007–08	Scott Gordon	Providence Bruins
2008–09	Scott Arniel	Manitoba Moose
2009–10	Guy Boucher	Hamilton Bulldogs
2010–11	John Hynes	Wilkes-Barre/Scranton Penguins
2011–12	Jon Cooper	Norfolk Admirals
2012–13	Willie Desjardins	Texas Stars
2013–14	Jeff Blashill	Grand Rapids Griffins
2014–15	Mike Stothers	Manchester Monarchs
2015–16	Rick Kowalsky	Albany Devils
2016–17	Roy Sommer	San Jose Barracuda
2017–18	Pascal Vincent (1)	Manitoba Moose
2018–19	Mike Vellucci	Charlotte Checkers
2019–20	Karl Taylor	Milwaukee Admirals
2020–21	Spencer Carbery	Hershey Bears
2021–22	Mitch Love (1)	Stockton Heat
2022–23	Mitch Love (2)	Calgary Wranglers
2023–24	Todd Nelson	Hershey Bears
2024–25	Pascal Vincent (2)	Laval Rocket
2025–26	Ryan Mougenel	Providence Bruins
