= Tim Tookey =

Canadian ice hockey player

- Born: August 29, 1960 (age 65) Edmonton, Alberta, Canada
- Height: 5 ft 11 in (180 cm)
- Weight: 180 lb (82 kg; 12 st 12 lb)
- Position: Centre
- Shot: Left
- Played for: Washington Capitals; Quebec Nordiques; Pittsburgh Penguins; Philadelphia Flyers; Los Angeles Kings
- NHL draft: 88th overall, 1979; Washington Capitals
- Playing career: 1980–1995

Timothy Raymond Tookey (born August 29, 1960) is a Canadian former professional ice hockey centre who played in the National Hockey League (NHL) for the Washington Capitals, Quebec Nordiques, Pittsburgh Penguins, Philadelphia Flyers and Los Angeles Kings. Tookey currently teaches entry level hockey in Reno, Nevada as well as coaches the Reno Ice Raiders, a Senior A FPHL team.

== Playing career ==
Tookey was selected in the 5th round, 88th overall, by the Washington Capitals in the 1979 NHL entry draft. He played three years with the Portland Winter Hawks, and finished with 107 goals and 252 points. He led the American Hockey league in scoring during the 1986-1987 season with 124 points. He is fourth all time in AHL history 974 career points. Tookey was a former coach of the NorPac hockey team Yellowstone Quake.

== Career statistics ==
			Regular season					Playoffs
Season	Team	League	GP	G	A	Pts	PIM	GP	G	A	Pts	PIM
1977–78	Portland Winter Hawks	WCHL	72	16	15	31	55	8	2	2	4	5
1978–79	Portland Winter Hawks	WHL	56	33	47	80	55	25	6	14	20	6
1979–80	Portland Winter Hawks	WHL	70	58	83	141	55	8	2	5	7	4
1980–81	Washington Capitals	NHL	29	10	13	23	18	—	—	—	—	—
1980–81	Hershey Bears	AHL	47	20	38	58	129	—	—	—	—	—
1981–82	Washington Capitals	NHL	28	8	8	16	35	—	—	—	—	—
1981–82	Hershey Bears	AHL	14	4	9	13	10	—	—	—	—	—
1981–82	Fredericton Express	AHL	16	6	10	16	16	—	—	—	—	—
1982–83	Quebec Nordiques	NHL	12	1	6	7	4	—	—	—	—	—
1982–83	Fredericton Express	AHL	53	24	43	67	24	9	5	4	9	0
1983–84	Pittsburgh Penguins	NHL	8	0	2	2	2	—	—	—	—	—
1983–84	Baltimore Skipjacks	AHL	58	16	28	44	25	8	1	1	2	2
1984–85	Baltimore Skipjacks	AHL	74	25	43	68	74	15	8	10	18	13
1985–86	Hershey Bears	AHL	69	35	62	97	66	18	11	8	19	10
1986–87	Philadelphia Flyers	NHL	2	0	0	0	0	10	1	3	4	2
1986–87	Hershey Bears	AHL	80	51	73	124	45	5	5	4	9	0
1987–88	Los Angeles Kings	NHL	20	1	6	7	8	—	—	—	—	—
1987–88	New Haven Nighthawks	AHL	11	6	7	13	2	—	—	—	—	—
1988–89	Los Angeles Kings	NHL	7	2	1	3	4	—	—	—	—	—
1988–89	New Haven Nighthawks	AHL	33	11	18	29	30	—	—	—	—	—
1988–89	Muskegon Lumberjacks	IHL	18	7	14	21	7	8	2	9	11	4
1989–90	Hershey Bears	AHL	42	18	22	40	28	—	—	—	—	—
1990–91	Hershey Bears	AHL	51	17	42	59	43	5	0	5	5	0
1991–92	Hershey Bears	AHL	80	36	69	105	63	6	4	2	6	4
1992–93	Hershey Bears	AHL	80	38	70	108	63	—	—	—	—	—
1993–94	Hershey Bears	AHL	66	32	57	89	43	11	4	9	13	8
1994–95	Providence Bruins	AHL	50	14	30	44	28	1	0	1	1	2
NHL totals			106	22	36	58	71	10	1	3	4	2
AHL totals			824	353	621	974	689	78	38	44	82	39
