= Frank Mario =

Canadian ice hockey player

- Born: February 25, 1921 Esterhazy, Saskatchewan, Canada
- Died: June 18, 1995 (aged 74)
- Height: 5 ft 6 in (168 cm)
- Weight: 165 lb (75 kg; 11 st 11 lb)
- Position: Centre
- Shot: Left
- Played for: Boston Bruins
- Playing career: 1941–1954

Frank George Mario (February 25, 1921 — June 18, 1995) was a Canadian professional ice hockey player who played 53 games in the National Hockey League with the Boston Bruins between 1941 and 1945. The rest of his career, which lasted from 1941 to 1954, was mainly spent with the Hershey Bears in the minor American Hockey League.

Mario scored nine NHL goals, the first of which came on January 25, 1942 in Boston's 7-3 home win over the Montreal Canadiens.

== Career statistics ==
=== Regular season and playoffs ===
			Regular season					Playoffs
Season	Team	League	GP	G	A	Pts	PIM	GP	G	A	Pts	PIM
1939–40	Regina Abbotts	S-SJHL	12	8	9	17	6	2	0	1	1	0
1939–40	Regina Abbotts	M-Cup	—	—	—	—	—	6	4	7	11	2
1940–41	Regina Rangers	S-SJHL	32	13	19	32	26	8	4	5	9	9
1941–42	Boston Bruins	NHL	9	1	1	2	0	—	—	—	—	—
1941–42	Hershey Bears	AHL	42	12	27	39	38	5	1	1	2	0
1942–43	Cornwall Army	QSHL	32	15	27	42	51	6	0	2	2	12
1942–43	Cornwall Army	Al-Cup	—	—	—	—	—	14	6	5	11	17
1944–45	Boston Bruins	NHL	44	8	18	26	24	—	—	—	—	—
1945–46	Hershey Bears	AHL	37	6	24	30	29	3	1	0	1	2
1946–47	Hershey Bears	AHL	64	24	47	71	65	11	5	13	18	7
1947–48	Hershey Bears	AHL	68	30	36	66	32	2	1	0	1	0
1948–49	Hershey Bears	AHL	68	26	46	72	27	11	2	3	5	0
1949–50	Hershey Bears	AHL	48	9	25	34	25	—	—	—	—	—
1950–51	Hershey Bears	AHL	58	21	38	59	40	6	0	4	4	0
1951–52	Hershey Bears	AHL	68	15	38	53	26	5	0	4	4	0
1952–53	Quebec Aces	QSHL	55	8	22	30	30	22	3	9	12	2
1953–54	Cornwall Colts	EOHL	—	—	—	—	—	—	—	—	—	—
1953–54	Cornwall Colts	Al-Cup	—	—	—	—	—	5	0	1	1	2
AHL totals			453	143	281	424	282	43	10	25	35	9
NHL totals			53	9	19	28	24	—	—	—	—	—
