= Eddie Shore Award =

AHL award

The Eddie Shore Award is presented annually to the best defenceman on the American Hockey League (AHL) as chosen by AHL media and players. The award is named after Hockey Hall of Fame inductee Eddie Shore.

== Winners ==
Season	Player	Team
1958–59	Steve Kraftcheck	Rochester Americans
1959–60	Larry Hillman	Providence Reds
1960–61	Bob McCord (1)	Springfield Indians
1961–62	Kent Douglas	Springfield Indians
1962–63	Marc Reaume	Hershey Bears
1963–64	Ted Harris	Cleveland Barons
1964–65	Al Arbour	Rochester Americans
1965–66	Jim Morrison	Quebec Aces
1966–67	Bob McCord (2)	Pittsburgh Hornets
1967–68	Bill Needham	Cleveland Barons
1968–69	Bob Blackburn	Buffalo Bisons
1969–70	Noel Price (1)	Springfield Kings
1970–71	Marshall Johnston	Cleveland Barons
1971–72	Noel Price (2)	Springfield Kings, Nova Scotia Voyageurs
1972–73	Ray McKay	Cincinnati Swords
1973–74	Gordie Smith	Springfield Kings
1974–75	Joe Zanussi	Providence Reds
1975–76	Noel Price (3)	Nova Scotia Voyageurs
1976–77	Brian Engblom	Nova Scotia Voyageurs
1977–78	Terry Murray (1)	Maine Mariners
1978–79	Terry Murray (2)	Maine Mariners
1979–80	Rick Vasko	Adirondack Red Wings
1980–81	Craig Levie	Nova Scotia Voyageurs
1981–82	Dave Farrish	New Brunswick Hawks
1982–83	Greg Tebbutt	Baltimore Skipjacks
1983–84	Garry Lariviere	St. Catharines Saints
1984–85	Richie Dunn	Binghamton Whalers
1985–86	Jim Wiemer	New Haven Nighthawks
1986–87	Brad Shaw	Binghamton Whalers
1987–88	Dave Fenyves (1)	Hershey Bears
1988–89	Dave Fenyves (2)	Hershey Bears
1989–90	Eric Weinrich	Utica Devils
1990–91	Norm Maciver	Cape Breton Oilers
1991–92	Greg Hawgood	Cape Breton Oilers
1992–93	Bobby Dollas	Adirondack Red Wings
1993–94	Chris Snell	St. John's Maple Leafs
1994–95	Jeff Serowik	Providence Bruins
1995–96	Barry Richter	Binghamton Rangers
1996–97	Darren Rumble	Philadelphia Phantoms
1997–98	Jamie Heward	Philadelphia Phantoms
1998–99	Ken Sutton	Albany River Rats
1999–00	Brad Tiley	Springfield Falcons
2000–01	John Slaney (1)	Wilkes-Barre/Scranton Penguins, Philadelphia Phantoms
2001–02	John Slaney (2)	Philadelphia Phantoms
2002–03	Curtis Murphy (1)	Houston Aeros
2003–04	Curtis Murphy (2)	Milwaukee Admirals
2004–05	Niklas Kronwall	Grand Rapids Griffins
2005–06	Andy Delmore	Syracuse Crunch
2006–07	Sheldon Brookbank	Milwaukee Admirals
2007–08	Andrew Hutchinson	Hartford Wolf Pack
2008–09	Johnny Boychuk	Providence Bruins
2009–10	Danny Groulx	Worcester Sharks
2010–11	Marc-Andre Gragnani	Portland Pirates
2011–12	Mark Barberio	Norfolk Admirals
2012–13	Justin Schultz	Oklahoma City Barons
2013–14	T. J. Brennan (1)	Toronto Marlies
2014–15	Chris Wideman	Binghamton Senators
2015–16	T. J. Brennan (2)	Toronto Marlies
2016–17	Matt Taormina	Syracuse Crunch
2017–18	Sami Niku	Manitoba Moose
2018–19	Zach Redmond	Rochester Americans
2019–20	Jake Bean	Charlotte Checkers
2020–21	Ryan Murphy	Henderson Silver Knights
2021–22	Jordan Gross	Colorado Eagles
2022–23	Christian Wolanin	Abbotsford Canucks
2023–24	Kyle Capobianco	Manitoba Moose
2024–25	Jacob MacDonald	Colorado Eagles
2025–26	Zac Jones	Rochester Americans

== NHL-level Eddie Shore Award ==
One of the Boston Bruins annual team awards is also named the Eddie Shore Award. It is awarded to the player with most hustle and determination.
