= Hershey Bears =

American Hockey League team in Hershey, Pennsylvania

- City: Hershey, Pennsylvania
- League: American Hockey League
- Conference: Eastern
- Division: Atlantic
- Founded: 1932 (T-SHL/EAHL); 1938 (IAHL/AHL)
- Home arena: Giant Center (2002–present)
- Colors: Chocolate, tan, cocoa, white
- Owner: Hershey Entertainment and Resorts Company
- General manager: Bryan Helmer (de facto – VP of Hockey Operations)
- Head coach: Derek King
- Captain: Louie Belpedio
- Media: The Patriot-News; WFVY; WHTM-TV (ABC27); WHP-TV (CBS21); WGAL-TV (NBC8); WPMT-TV (FOX43); AHL.TV (Internet)
- Affiliates: Washington Capitals (NHL); South Carolina Stingrays (ECHL)

Franchise history
- 1932–1933†: Hershey B'ars (T-SHL)
- 1933–1934†: Hershey Chocolate B'ars (EAHL)
- 1934–1936†: Hershey B'ars (EAHL)
- 1936–1938†: Hershey Bears (EAHL)
- 1938–1939†: Hershey Cubs (EAHL)
- † —Non-AHL franchises operated by the Hershey Hockey Club
- 1938–present: Hershey Bears (IAHL, AHL)

Championships
- Regular season titles: 9 (1942–43, 1957–58, 1980–81, 1985–86, 1987–88, 2006–07, 2009–10, 2020–21, 2023–24)
- Division titles: 20 (1938–39, 1943–44, 1946–47, 1951–52, 1966–67, 1967–68, 1968–69, 1975–76, 1980–81, 1985–86, 1987–88, 1993–94, 2006–07, 2008–09, 2009–10, 2014–15, 2015–16, 2020–21, 2023–24, 2024–25)
- Conference titles: 25 (1940–41, 1941–42, 1944–45, 1946–47, 1948–49, 1953–54, 1957–58, 1958–59, 1960–61, 1962–63, 1964–65, 1968–69, 1973–74, 1975–76, 1979–80, 1985–86, 1987–88, 1996–97, 2005–06, 2006–07, 2008–09, 2009–10, 2015–16, 2022–23, 2023–24)
- Calder Cups: 13 (1946–47, 1957–58, 1958–59, 1968–69, 1973–74, 1979–80, 1987–88, 1996–97, 2005–06, 2008–09, 2009–10, 2022–23, 2023–24)

Current uniform

The Hershey Bears are a professional ice hockey team based in Hershey, Pennsylvania. The Bears have played in the American Hockey League (AHL) since the 1938–39 season, making it the longest continuously operating member club of the league still playing in its original city.

The Bears organization has served as the primary development club for the NHL's Washington Capitals since 2005–06. Since 2002–03, the hockey club's home games have been played at Giant Center, located less than half a mile west of Hersheypark Arena, the AHL club's previous home from 1938 to 2002. (The arena was also the home to the EAHL Hershey Bears from 1936 to 1938.) The Bears have won 13 Calder Cups, more than any other AHL team. They won their most recent title in 2024.

Chocolate manufacturer Milton S. Hershey first established the "Hershey Hockey Club" in 1932 to manage professional hockey teams based in Hershey. Now in its ninth decade, it has operated four teams in three pro leagues, including the AHL Bears. Now called the Hershey Bears Hockey Club, it is a subsidiary of the Hershey Entertainment and Resorts Company (originally called "Hershey Estates" and later "HERCO"), the entertainment and hospitality division of the Hershey Trust Company.

Gordie Howe, who was selected into the Hockey Hall of Fame in 1972 and was known as "Mr. Hockey", once remarked, "Everybody who is anybody in hockey has played in Hershey", although he himself did not play there.

== Team history ==
=== The origins of "Hershey Hockey" ===
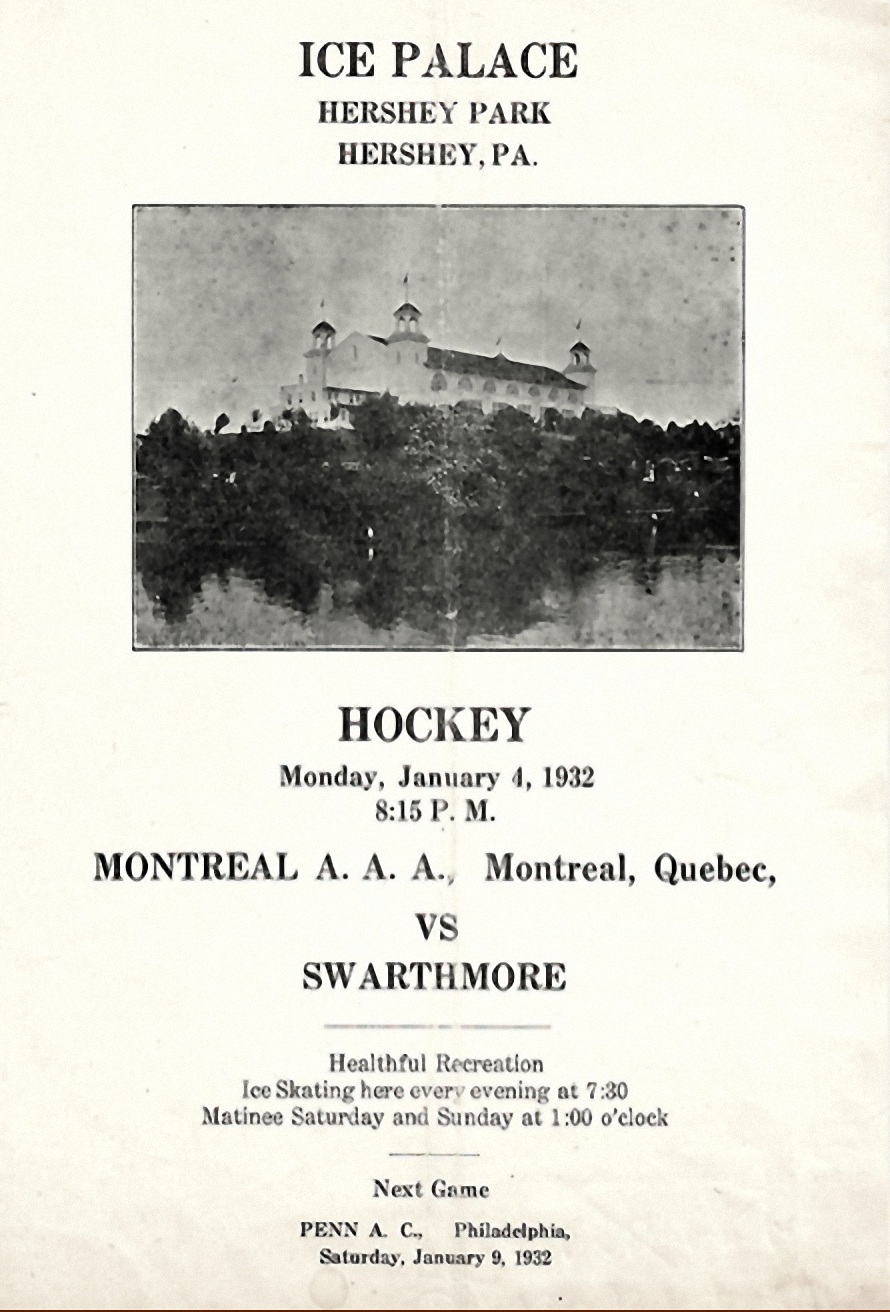
Hershey Ice Palace 1932 amateur hockey program

The history of Hershey hockey goes back to a series of amateur hockey matches played in Hershey between college teams beginning in early 1931. The first such formal hockey game ever played in Hershey took place on February 18, 1931, when Penn A.C. and Villanova University faced off in the 1,900-seat Hershey Ice Palace. Nine months after that successful inaugural contest, Swarthmore Athletic Club moved into the Ice Palace, where they played their first game on November 19, 1931, against Crescent A.C. of New York City. In the lineup that night for Crescent was a 23-year-old center named Lloyd S. Blinco, a native of Grand Mere, Quebec, who came to Hershey the next season and would remain continuously associated with Hershey hockey for a half century as a player, coach, and manager.

The popularity of these amateur hockey matches prompted chocolate-maker and amusement park operator Milton Hershey and his long-time entertainment and amusements chief, John B. Sollenberger, to bring pro hockey to Hershey by sponsoring a permanent team. To that end, Mr. Hershey established the Hershey Hockey Club (now called the Hershey Bears Hockey Club) in 1932, which is now the oldest such continuously operating professional ice hockey management organization (the players themselves were ostensibly amateurs during the first few years) in North America outside of those operating the "Original Six" clubs of the National Hockey League in Montreal, Toronto, Boston, New York, Chicago, and Detroit, which were all established in or before 1926. The first hockey team the organization iced was the amateur Hershey B'ars in the newly formed Tri-State Hockey League which included three other teams from Philadelphia, Baltimore, and Atlantic City. After a single season in 1932–33, that circuit reformed itself into a larger, seven-club Eastern Amateur Hockey League in which Hershey played first as the "Chocolate B'ars" (1933–1934), then again as the "B'ars" (1934–1936), and finally from 1936 to 1938 as the "Hershey Bears", a name adopted in response to criticism levied by New York sportswriters and the league that the "B'ars" moniker was too commercial. (These writers had already informally dubbed the club as the "Bears from Penn's Woods" when they visited Madison Square Garden to play the New York Rovers.)

On December 19, 1936, the newly renamed EAHL Bears also moved from the confines of the Ice Palace (where they had to play on a small, 60×170-foot rink) into the newly constructed 7,286-seat Hersheypark Arena (then known as the "Hershey Sports Arena") built immediately adjacent to the older venue. Over the next 66 seasons, Bears' teams played a total of 2,280 EAHL and AHL regular season and playoff games at the Hersheypark Arena, which served as the home to hockey in Hershey from 1936 to 2002. Since 2002, the Bears have used Hersheypark Arena as their practice arena only.

The Bears won the 1937 EAHL championship, then played in an international tournament arranged by the Canadian Amateur Hockey Association (CAHA) to determine a world's amateur champion, in direct conflict with the actual 1937 Ice Hockey World Championships. The CAHA tournament was hosted at Maple Leaf Gardens in Toronto, and invited the champions of the 1937 Allan Cup (Sudbury Tigers), the 1937 Memorial Cup (Winnipeg Monarchs), the EAHL (Hershey Bears) and the English National League (Wembley Lions). The schedule for the competition was a six-game double round-robin tournament from April 17 to 24, followed by a best-of-three game final series between the top two teams. CAHA representative W. A. Hewitt announced the shortening of the series due to poor attendance. The game between Hershey and Winnipeg was cancelled as both teams went home early, with the tournament being completed by a best-of-three series between Sudbury and Wembley, which Sudbury won on a sudden death overtime goal by George Hastie in the third game.

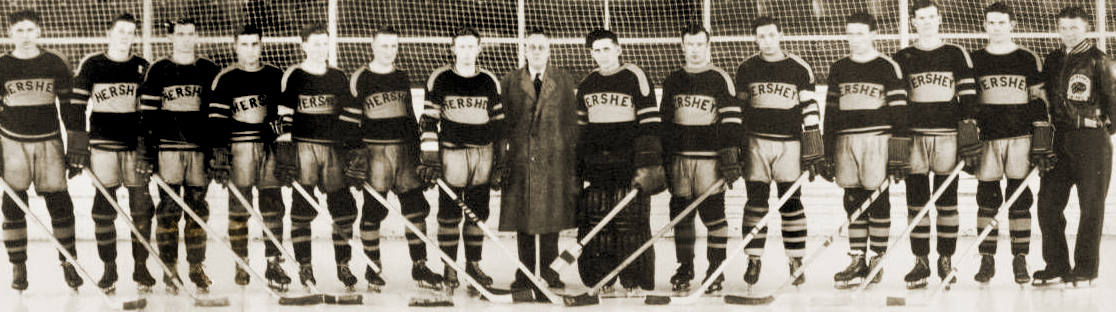
The 1932–33 Hershey B'ars at the Ice Palace, Hershey's first pro hockey team (Tri-State Hockey League)

=== The Bears join the IAHL ===
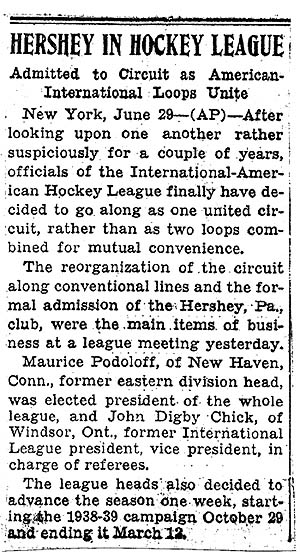
Newspaper clipping of The Philadelphia Record on June 29, 1938, covering the admission for the Hershey Bears

Since 1936, the Canadian–American Hockey League and International Hockey League had formed an eight-team "circuit of mutual convenience" playing an interlocking schedule as the International-American Hockey League.

On June 28, 1938, the Can-Am and IHL formally merged into a single league under the IAHL name. One of the first acts of the newly merged league, which became the American Hockey League in 1940, was to grant an expansion franchise to the Hershey Bears Hockey Club, which at the time still owned and operated the EAHL Hershey Bears, the then three-time regular-season champions of that league. The new Bears took the place of the defunct Buffalo Bisons in the IAHL's West Division, allowing the IAHL to play a balanced schedule for the first time in over two years. While the new Bears began play in the IAHL in 1938, the hockey club also continued to operate an EAHL team, the Hershey Cubs, for one more season before leaving that league altogether. In 1977 Hershey became the only original AHL hockey club to have continuously iced a team in the same city since the league's inaugural season as a fully merged league when the Rhode Island Reds franchise was sold and moved to New York state as the Binghamton Dusters after the 1976–77 campaign.

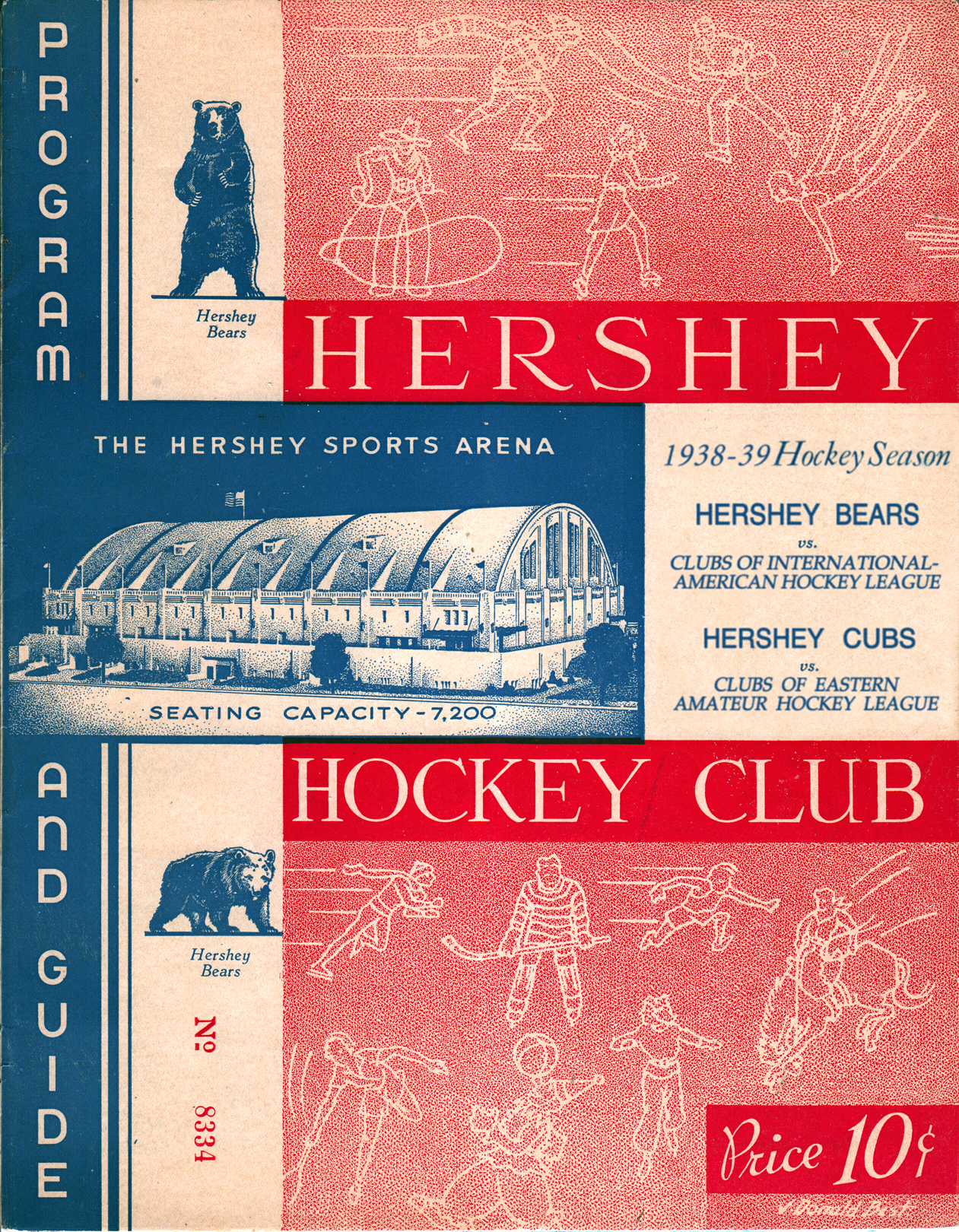
Hershey Hockey Club program and guide (1938–39)

Defenseman Henry J. "Hank" Lauzon, an original EAHL B'ar, became the first player to sign with the new Bears. The former EAHL club's coach, Herb Mitchell, guided the IAHL Bears for their first three seasons. The Bears made a very good account of themselves in their first IAHL campaign, winning the West Division with a 31–18–5 record—the first of 16 regular-season division titles. However, they were defeated in the first round of the Calder Cup playoffs by the New York Rangers' top farm team, the Philadelphia Ramblers, three-games-to-two. Defenseman Herb Kalbfleisch became the first Hershey player to be named a First Team All Star that year while goalie Alfie Moore took Second Team honors behind the Ramblers' Bert Gardiner.

Former Boston Bruins coach and Hockey Hall of Fame member (elected 1971) Ralph "Cooney" Weiland guided Hershey throughout the war years winning regular-season titles in 1942–43 and 1943–44. The Bears' 13 losses in 1942–43 are still the fewest by the club in a single season while Wally Kilrea's 99 points (31–68) that season gave Hershey its first of ten AHL scoring champions. Hershey won their first of 13 Calder Cup titles in 1947 under second year coach Don Penniston while also winning their fourth Division title in just nine seasons that year dominating the AHL's East with 84 points (25 more than second-place Springfield) on a record of 36–16–12 behind All Star goalie Harvey Bennett, Sr. In the playoffs, Hershey defeated the Western Division champion Cleveland Barons in a four-game first-round sweep outscoring them 24–3 before winning the Calder Cup finals in seven games over the Pittsburgh Hornets.

In 1948, 21-year-old Winnipeg-born center Arnie Kullman joined the Bears, and except for 13 games with the Boston Bruins in 1949–50, he played his entire twelve-year career in Hershey. When Kullman retired in 1960 he had amassed 629 points on 253 goals and 376 assists in a Hershey uniform, a total which would only be eclipsed by Tim Tookey (with whom he shared number nine that was eventually retired in honor of both players) and Mike Nykoluk. Kullman's 753 games as a Bear is also second only to Nykoluk's 972.

=== 1950s–1960s ===
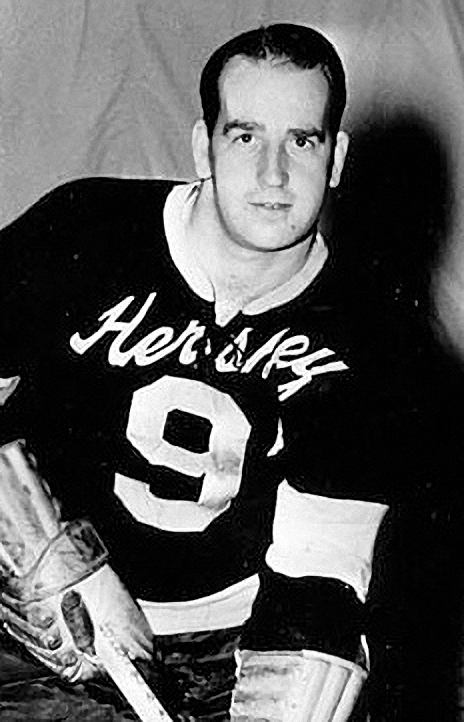
Arnie Kullman (1948–60)

From 1950 to 1956 the Bears were coached by a pair of former Boston Bruin defensemen: Johnny Crawford (1950–52), who guided Hershey to another division title in 1951–52, followed by player-coach Murray Henderson (1952–56). In 1953–54, center George "Red" Sullivan became the second Bear to win a scoring title and the first to be named the league's MVP, collecting 119 points (30–89) in 69 games to set an AHL regular-season scoring record which stood for almost thirty years, while his 89 assists that season is still an AHL record six decades later.

Don "Grapes" Cherry, who as a coach (Rochester, Boston, Colorado) and later a broadcaster became a visible and controversial figures, briefly skated in Hershey during this era. As a 20-year-old defenseman, Cherry made his professional debut with the Bears during the 1954–55 season and also played for the club in 1956–57. As a TV personality and longtime commentator on Hockey Night in Canada, this former Bear is a recognized figure in Canada in any field.

With the demise of the AHL Pittsburgh Hornets in 1956, Bears managers John Sollenberger and Lloyd Blinco were able to acquire the services of seven of the recent Calder Cup champion Hornets' best players including four-time All Star goalie Gil Mayer and the AHL's eventual all-time scoring leader Willie Marshall (523–852—1,205). The most important from Pittsburgh, however, was the AHL's only five-time First-Team All-Star defenseman, Frank S. Mathers, who remained active with the Bears for an unprecedented thirty-five seasons as an All Star defenseman, player-coach, general manager, and club president. Under Mathers's leadership, Hershey won over 1,500 games and six Calder Cup titles while Mathers himself was honored with the Lester Patrick Award in 1987 for his "contributions to hockey in the United States", and in 1992 he became the second individual to be elected to the Hockey Hall of Fame based on a career in the AHL.

While the Mathers era in Hershey started slowly with a fourth-place finish in 1956–57, he led the Bears back-to-back Calder Cup titles in his second and third seasons as a player-coach. With Bobby Perreault and Mayer in goal, the league's top two scorers in linemates Marshall and Dunc Fisher, and Mathers himself earning All Star honors on defense for the sixth time in seven years, the Bears won both the regular season and playoff championships in 1957–58. Although Hershey finished the 1958–59 season with just a .500 record (32–32–6), they defeated the Cleveland Barons in the first round before upsetting the regular-season champion Buffalo Bisons in the finals, four games to two, to win their third Calder Cup title.

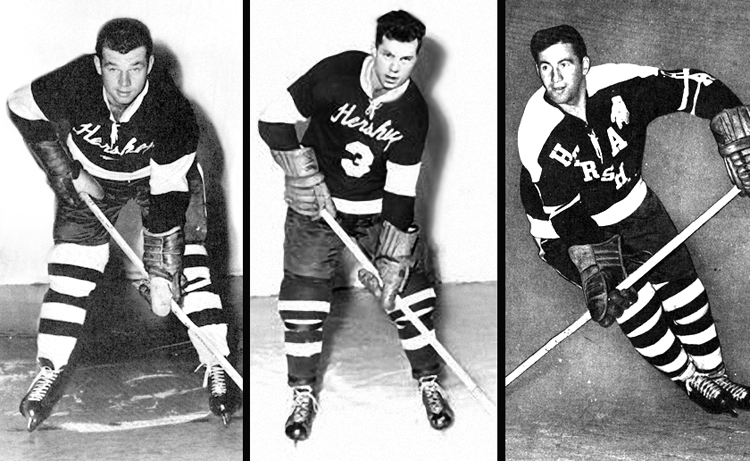
From left to right: Don Cherry, Frank Mathers, and Mike Nykoluk. All joined the Bears in the 1950s

In 1958 the Bears also acquired the services of 23-year-old center Mike Nykoluk who had split the previous two seasons between the Toronto Maple Leafs and their AHL club in Rochester. When Nykoluk retired fourteen years later in 1972, he was the AHL's then fourth (now sixth) all-time leader in points with 881 on 195 goals and 686 assists and his 972 games as a Bear are 219 more than Kullman's second overall 753 in a Hershey uniform. In 1972 his jersey number eight also became the first to ever be retired by the Bears.

Although it was more than a decade before the Calder Cup returned to Hershey, during the first half of the 1960s five key players joined the club who would each stay from anywhere from seven to nine seasons: defensemen Barry Ashbee (1962–70) and Ralph Keller (1963–72), and forwards Roger DeJordy (1962–70), Michel Harvey (1963–71) and Gil Gilbert (1965–72). Together they would eventually account for 2,654 games played, 710 goals, 1,251 assists, and 1,961 points as Bears. While these five and league MVP Mike Nykoluk all helped the Bears win their division's regular-season title in 1966–67, for the first time since 1957–58, on a 38–24–10 record behind the goaltending of First Team All Star Andre Gill and a league-leading 52 goals by DeJordy, it would be another two years before the Calder Cup returned to Hershey in 1968–69 defeating the Quebec Aces in five games. Gilbert led the league in scoring with 100 points (35–65) with teammate Michel Harvey close behind at 93 as the Bears also won their third consecutive Eastern Divisional title. That season also saw Mathers add the duties of GM to his portfolio with the retirement of Lloyd Blinco from that post.

=== 1970s–1980s ===
With the close of the 1972–73 season Frank Mathers ended his unbroken 17-year run as coach to devote his efforts full-time to his duties as GM. Including a brief return to the bench in 1984–85, Mathers compiled a personal coaching record of 610–513–134 for a career-winning percentage of .539. His successor was former Bears winger Chuck Hamilton (1973–79) who had spent seven seasons playing for Hershey from 1963 to 1970. In his first season as the Bears' coach Hamilton led a relatively inexperienced squad including nine rookies to a fifth Calder Cup title losing only two games in the playoffs' three rounds in which they were victorious against the Cincinnati Swords (4–1), Baltimore Clippers (4–0), and Providence Reds (4–1) with the championship game played at the Arena before a then record crowd of 8,703.

Hershey won a sixth Calder Cup in 1979–80 under player/coach Doug Gibson who replaced first year coach Gary Green when he was unexpectedly promoted to the Bears' then NHL affiliate, the Washington Capitals, early in the season. Gibson also led the Bears in playoff scoring with a dozen goals and seven assists for 19 points in sixteen Calder Cup games while goaltending was shared by Gary Inness (6–1) who himself would later coach the team and Dave Parro (6–3). Although Hershey had finished four games below .500 during the regular season (35–39–9), the Bears defeated the Syracuse Firebirds (4–0) in the opening round before upsetting both the Southern Division champion New Haven Nighthawks (4–2) in the semifinals and the Northern Division winning New Brunswick Hawks (4–2) in the finals with two of their four wins in the championship series in double overtime.

Although the Bears did not repeat as Calder Cup champions in 1980–81, under new coach Bryan Murray the club had its best regular season to that point with 103 points on a record of 47–24–9 and established a still-standing record for goals with 357. Right wing Mark Lofthouse became the fifth Bear to win the AHL's scoring title (48-55–103), and on the night of February 7, 1981, he also set a team single-game record eight points (4–4) as the Bears defeated the Rochester Americans at Hersheypark Arena, 11–2, while the team also tied the AHL's then record for goals in a period with nine. Among the Bears' rookies that year was a 20-year-old center Tim Tookey, who over three separate stints with the Bears (1980–82, 1985–87, 1989–94) over the next fourteen years collected 693 points (251–442) in 529 regular-season games, second only to Mike Nykoluk's 808 on the Bears' all-time list.

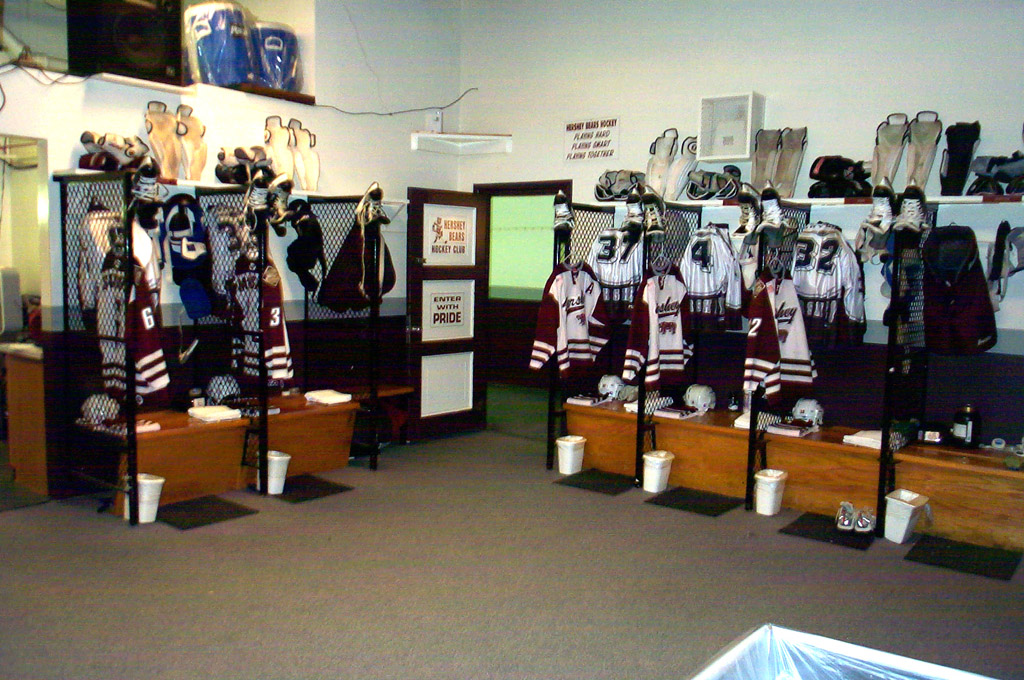
Bears locker room at HersheyPark Arena

As had Gary Green in 1979, Murray left the Bears early in the 1981–82 season to become coach of the Washington Capitals (replacing Green) and was replaced by former Hershey goalie Gary Inness under most unusual circumstances. Inness had retired as a player a year earlier but wanted to remain in Hershey and keep involved with the Bears. With no coaching position available to offer him, but in need of a new trainer, Bears GM Frank Mathers offered him that job. With Murray's promotion to Washington a month later elevated Inness the eleventh coach in the Bears' history. Inness would remain behind the Hershey bench until December, 1984, when Frank Mathers returned to that post on an interim basis for the first time since 1973 and coached the club until then recently retired Hall of Fame Flyer winger Bill Barber took over for the final sixteen games of the season.

The 1984–85 season was also the first of a dozen year affiliation with the Philadelphia Flyers who shared the club with the Boston Bruins that year before taking over as the sole parent club the next season and remained so through 1995–96. Former Flyer right wing and AHL Hall of Fame coach John Paddock (1985–89) took over for the next four seasons and under his guidance the Bears averaged 45 wins a year, won two overall regular-season titles, reached the play-off finals twice, and brought Hershey a seventh Calder Cup championship in 1987–88.

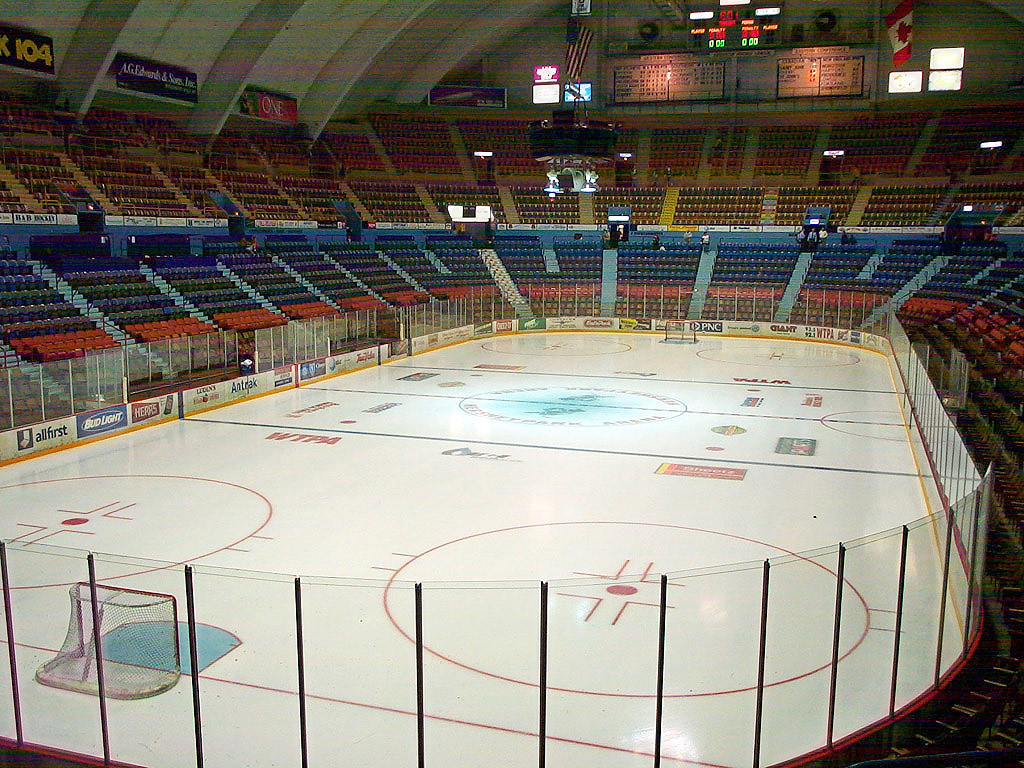
HersheyPark Arena

In his first year as the Bears' coach, Paddock led the club to first place overall in the regular season with a 48–29–3 record and either four goals in the final game of that 1985–86 season, left wing Ross Fitzpatrick became the third Bear to score 50 goals in a season while rookie goalie Ron Hextall set a team record with three consecutive shutouts at home. Both Hextall and defenseman Kevin McCarthy were First Team All Stars while linemates Fitzpatrick and Tim Tookey were both named to the second All Star Team. With five shutouts and a 30–19–2 record, Hextall became the first (and so far only) Bear to be named AHL Rookie of the Year as well as winning the Baz Bastien Memorial Trophy as the AHL's top goalie. (As an NHL rookie the following season with the Flyers Hextall won both the Vezina Trophy and Conn Smythe Trophy.) Although the Bears lost to the Adirondack Red Wings in the Calder Cup finals, Tookey also won the Jack Butterfield Trophy as MVP of the play-offs.)

Although the Bears finished fourth in the Southern Division in 1986–87 with 87 points (43–36–1), their top line of Tookey, Fitzpatrick and Ray Allison finished first, fifth and seventh in overall league scoring with 124, 85 and 84 points respectively and accounted for a total of 125 of the Bears' 329 goals while center Mitch Lamoureux also finished in the top ten with 43 goals and 46 assists for 89 points good for fourth overall in the league. Tookey's 124 points (51 goals, 73 assists) also established a still-standing single-season record for a Hershey player, made him the seventh Bear to win the AHL's scoring title, and just the third to win the Les Cunningham Plaque as the league's MVP. Tookey's 124 points that year is still the sixth-best single-season total for an individual player in AHL history, just fourteen points less than the current league record of 138 set by former Bear Don Biggs with the Binghamton Rangers in 1992–93.

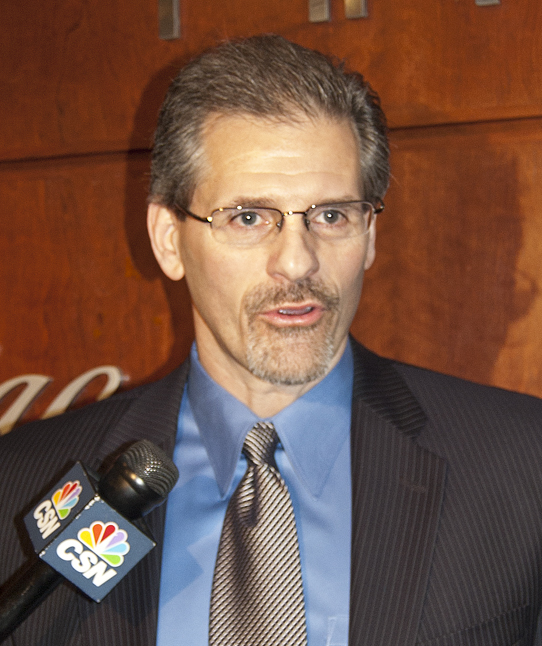
Flyers Ron Hextall was the AHL Rookie of the Year as a Bear in 1985–86.

With the start of the 1987–88 season, Hershey became the first professional hockey club outside of the NHL to reach the half century mark and that year also both won a then league record 50 regular-season games and swept all three of its playoff series for an unblemished postseason record of 12–0 and a seventh Calder Cup title. After an unexpectedly slow 3–7–0 start, goalie Wendell Young was returned to Hershey from the Flyers and went 33–15–3 with a 2.77 GAA while rookie Darryl Gilmour appeared in 25 games compiling a 14–7–0 record and 3.68 average. Along with veterans such as Bears leading scorer center Mitch Lamoureux, wingers Al Hill, Don Nachbaur, Kevin Maxwell, and defensemen Steve Smith and Dave Fenvyes, the team also had nine first- and second-year players including second-year winger Brian Dobbin who finished third in team scoring behind Lamoureux and Maxwell with 83 points (36–47) even though he had been recalled to Philadelphia seven times during the campaign and only played in 54 games for Hershey, and rookie center Glen Seabrooke also broke the 30-goal mark (32) and was fifth overall in Bears scoring with 78 points. On defense the Bears had second-year blueliner John Stevens, now associate coach of the two-time Stanley Cup champion Los Angeles Kings, rookie Gordie Murphy who is now an assistant coach with the Flyers, and Jeff Chychrun, another sophomore. On May 12, 1988, Hershey completed its unprecedented 12–0 sweep to the Cup by defeating the Fredericton Express, 4–2.

=== Modern era ===
The Washington Capitals returned as the Bears NHL parent club in 2005 after a 21-year span with the Boston Bruins, the Philadelphia Flyers, and the Colorado Avalanche. (The club has also had earlier NHL affiliations with the Bruins, Pittsburgh Penguins, and Buffalo Sabres.) As of the 2009–2010 Calder Cup Finals, the Bears have played in 22 Finals series, a league record. The Bears went back-to-back in 2008–2010 to win their 10th and 11th Calder Cups, winning their most recent cup versus the Texas Stars. The Bears became the first team in AHL history to win a Calder Cup series after trailing the series 0–2, going on to win 4 straight to take the series 4–2.

On December 20, 2006, the Bears played their 5,000th regular-season game at the Times Union Center in Albany, New York. The Bears scored seven times en route to a 7–4 win versus the Albany River Rats. On May 2, 2007, the Bears played their 500th Calder Cup playoff game in franchise history at the GIANT Center. The Bears played the Wilkes-Barre/Scranton Penguins and won 4–3.

In 2010, the Bears set a new club record with 12 straight wins, topping their previous record of 11 which was set the season earlier in 2008. Over the stretch from December into January, the Bears outscored their opponents by a 52–22 margin. The Bears also set a new AHL record for consecutive home victories at 24. Hershey went without a loss at GIANT Center from November 29, 2009, to March 19, 2010. Hershey has set an AHL mark for consecutive playoff series victories, with eight wins in a row. Besting the record shared with the 2005–2007 Bears and the 1990–1992 Springfield Indians.

=== 2006 Calder Cup championship ===
In 2006 the Hershey Bears, with new head coach Bruce Boudreau, returned to the playoffs after a two-year absence. The team came off with a strong start by winning their first two series, against the Norfolk Admirals and the Wilkes-Barre/Scranton Penguins, in four games each. In the Eastern Conference finals, the Bears played the Portland Pirates. The Bears quickly took a 2–0 series lead, but then lost the third game. The Bears then rebounded and won Game 4 to take a 3–1 series lead. However, the Bears were unable to finish the job and were forced back to the Giant Center for Game 7. The Bears trailed throughout the game, but managed to tie it with a goal from Graham Mink just over two minutes remaining. In overtime, the Bears finished with a goal by Eric Fehr, to win the series 4–3. On June 15, 2006, The Bears won the Calder Cup by a series mark of 4–2, defeating the Milwaukee Admirals. This marked the ninth time the franchise had won the Calder Cup, which tied Hershey with the original Cleveland Barons for the highest number of AHL playoff titles.

=== Tenth championship ===
The following season, Boudreau's Bears finished with a 51–17–6 record and appeared to be on the verge of repeating as champions. They rolled through the playoffs defeating Albany in five games, Wilkes-Barre/Scranton in five, and won the Eastern Conference in a sweep of Manchester. The Bears appeared to have a tenth title wrapped up against Hamilton, who had finished the regular season with 95 points compared to Hershey's 114. The Bulldogs, however, upset the Bears 4–1. The next season was disappointing to the Bears – Boudreau was promoted to head coach of the Capitals, and the Bears would finish the season 42–30–2–6, losing to Wilkes-Barre/Scranton 4–1 in the first round.

The next season, the Bears bounced back. Finishing with a 49–23–2 record, they went on to sweep the Philadelphia Phantoms in the first round, overcome a 3–2 deficit to beat Wilkes-Barre/Scranton in the second, and then defeated Providence, 4–1, in the conference finals. They opened their 21st Calder Cup appearance with a 5–4 overtime win over the Manitoba Moose in Winnipeg, but lost Game 2, 3–1. Back home in Hershey, the Bears scored a pair of wins (3–0 and 2–1) before falling in Game 5, 3–2. In Game 6, the Bears scored three goals before Manitoba even got on the board, and then an empty-net goal sealed it. With the 4–1 victory, the Bears defeated Manitoba and finally recorded their league-record tenth Calder Cup.

=== 2009–10 season ===
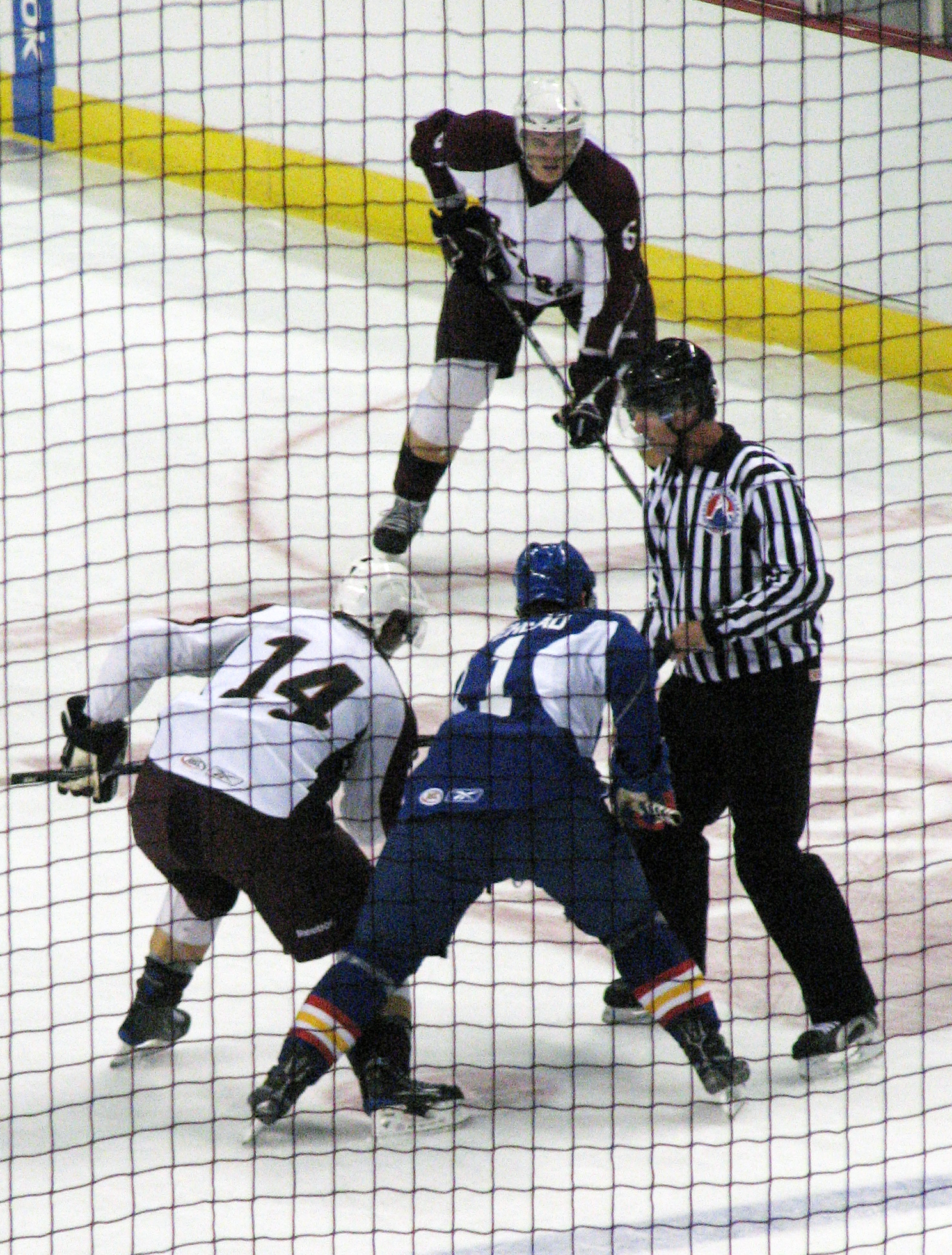
The Bears playing against the Norfolk Admirals during the 2009 preseason

Following the Calder Cup win, head coach Bob Woods was promoted to Washington as an assistant coach. He was replaced by Mark French, a former coach in the ECHL. The 2009–10, Bears won a franchise-record 12 consecutive games and notched a 24-game win streak at the Giant Center. They went on to win 60 games, breaking the old AHL record of 57 and finishing a point shy of tying the single-season points record. The Bears rallied from a 2–0 deficit against the Texas Stars to win their 11th Calder Cup, their second consecutive championship and third in the last five seasons.

=== Seasons following 11th championship ===
The Bears each made the 2011, 2012, and 2013 playoffs, however they were all eliminated in the first round, and failed to make the 2014 playoffs. The Bears advanced to the second round of the 2015 Calder Cup playoffs, but were eliminated by the Hartford Wolf Pack. In the 2015–16 season, the Bears qualified for the 2016 Calder Cup playoffs where they defeated the Portland Pirates three games to two in the first round. Hershey then faced the Wilkes-Barre/Scranton Penguins in the division finals and won four games to three and won the Emile Francis Trophy. In the conference finals, the Bears defeated the regular-season champion Toronto Marlies four games to one, winning the Richard F. Canning Trophy as conference champions. In the Calder Cup finals, the Bears were swept by the Lake Erie Monsters in four games. Chris Bourque was awarded the AHL regular-season MVP Les Cunningham Award, earned the John B. Sollenberger Trophy as the league's top scorer, and was named to the First All-Star Team. In the 2016–17 season, the Bears finished in third place in the Atlantic Division. The Bears defeated the Lehigh Valley Phantoms in the division semifinals in five games before losing to the Providence Bruins in the division finals in seven games Travis Boyd was chosen for the Second All-Star Team.

The Bears failed to qualify for the 2017–18 playoffs. The Bears made the 2019 playoffs, but were quickly eliminated by the Charlotte Checkers in the second round.

=== AHL Outdoor Classic ===
Hersheypark Stadium hosted the fourth annual AHL Outdoor Classic in 2013, with the Bears facing their intrastate rival Wilkes-Barre/Scranton Penguins. The "Baby Pens" defeated the Bears in front of a capacity crowd of 17,311 fans by a score of 2–1.

5 years later, Hershey once again held the AHL Outdoor Classic on January 20, 2018, the AHL's 10th outdoor game, with the Bears facing their intrastate rival Lehigh Valley Phantoms. The Flyers affiliate from Allentown defeated the Bears in front of a crowd of 13,091 fans by a score of 5–2.

=== Back-to-Back championships (2020–present) ===
The Bears won the Macgregor Kilpatrick Trophy in 2020–21, no playoffs were held that year due to the COVID-19 pandemic. The Bears qualified for the 2022 Calder Cup playoffs, but fell short to the Wilkes-Barre/Scranton Penguins, 2 games to 1. In the 2023 Calder Cup playoffs, the Bears overcame a 2–0 series deficit in the finals to beat the Coachella Valley Firebirds in 7 games. Following the 2023–24 season, the Bears set a league record for most wins under a 72-game season (53), a franchise record in point percentage (.771), a franchise record (53–14–0–5), and total points (111). They later went on to eliminate the Cleveland Monsters in 7 games, setting up a rematch from the previous season's finals, winning in six games to win their 13th Calder Cup.

== Team information ==
=== Logos and uniforms ===
The colors of the Hershey Bears are dark brown, medium brown, tan, and white (though the team's primary colors are often referred to as "chocolate and white"), a reference to The Hershey Company and its products. The primary logo is a medium brown bear, outlined in dark brown, roaring while standing on a hockey stick centered above the Hershey Bears wordmark. The wordmark has Hershey in tan above Bears in white (both outlined in dark brown). All these parts are contained by a circle filled in tan and outlined in dark brown on the primary logo.

Before their move to the Giant Center in 2002, the Hershey Bears wore simpler uniforms with the colors of chocolate brown and white. The previous logo used a silhouette of a skating bear with a hockey stick in brown centered in a white, ovular shield outlined in brown. For their move to the Giant Center, the Bears unveiled a new identity-its team colors being burgundy, black, gold, and silver. The primary logo was a maroon bear, outlined in black, swatting a hockey puck centered below the Hershey Bears wordmark. The wordmark was a horizontal gradient using gold and burgundy outlined in black, with the Hershey part centered on a rectangular outline designed to resemble a Hershey's candy bar. The alternate logo consisted of a bear's head in burgundy and black with the initials HB.

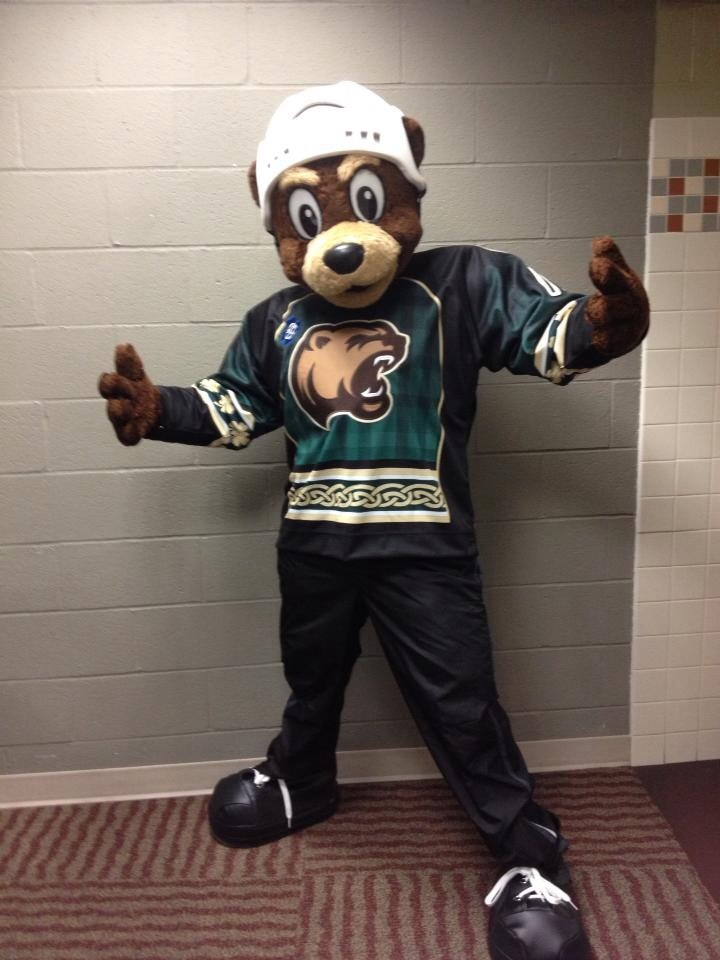
Coco with a special St. Patrick's Day jersey

In the advent of the 2007–08 season, all of the teams of the American Hockey League unveiled newly designed Reebok Edge uniforms, including the Bears. At this time they unveiled an updated version of the "old school" jerseys with the word Bears written diagonally in black on a white home jersey and the word Hershey written in white on a maroon away jersey. Both jerseys featured black on both sides, the Washington Capitals logo on one shoulder and the classic "skating bear' oval logo on the other shoulder.

Hershey overhauled their uniforms before the 2012–13 season. The home uniform includes a white jersey with chocolate brown and tan striping. The Bears' primary logo is centered on the front. The shoulder logos feature a stylized bear-foot print. The away jersey is chocolate brown with white shoulders and tan stripes near the bottom of the sweater. The current third jersey features a cursive style Hershey wording, above the number on the front, in a dark tan color.

The Bears' current uniforms are similar to those of the 2012–13 jerseys, the uniforms consist of the Capitals eagle logo instead of both bear paws on the jersey, making the stripes larger, and making the shoulders a tan color instead of one color going around the entire jersey.

=== Mascot ===
The official mascot of the Bears is a brown bear called "Coco". Coco wears a Bears home jersey, white helmet, brown hockey gloves, and ice skates while skating and black track pants with black shoes. He debuted on October 14, 1978, at the Hersheypark Arena.

== Teddy bear toss ==
Since 2001, the Hershey Bears annually host a charity event called the teddy bear toss that is usually held around Christmas time. Since 2018 until 2025, the Hershey Bears have consecutively broken the world record for the teddy bear toss. The world record was set in 2025 at 102,343. The most recent counting was 81,796.

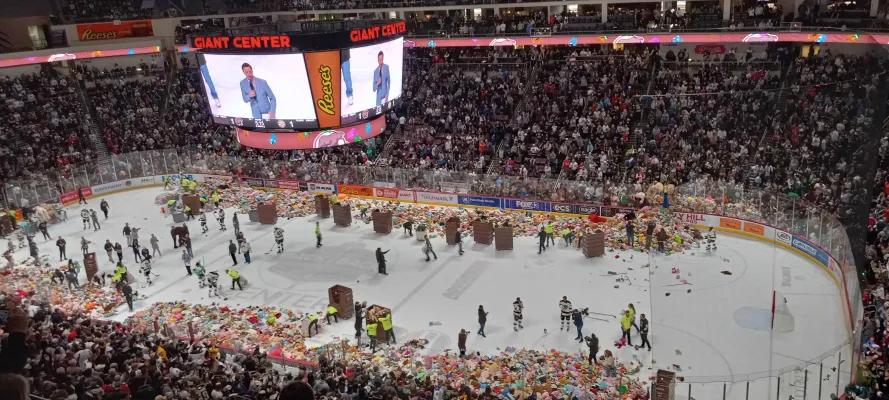
Hershey Bears teddy bear toss held on January 5, 2025.

=== Teddy bear toss numbers ===
	Season	Opponent	Counted
Teddy bear toss numbers
Teddy bear toss numbers	2016	Syracuse Crunch	20,662
Teddy bear toss numbers	2017	Wilkes-Barre/Scranton Penguins	25,017
Teddy bear toss numbers	2018	Binghamton Devils	34,798
Teddy bear toss numbers	2019	Hartford Wolf Pack	45,650
Teddy bear toss numbers	2020	No teddy bear toss due to COVID-19 pandemic	
Teddy bear toss numbers	2021	No teddy bear toss due to COVID-19 pandemic	
Teddy bear toss numbers	2022	Hartford Wolf Pack	52,341
Teddy bear toss numbers	2023	Bridgeport Islanders	67,309
Teddy bear toss numbers	2024	Lehigh Valley Phantoms	74,599
Teddy bear toss numbers	2025	Providence Bruins	102,343
Teddy bear toss numbers	2026	Rockford Icehogs	81,796

== Season-by-season record ==
This is a partial list of the past five seasons completed by the Bears. For the full season-by-season history, see List of Hershey Bears seasons

Regular season											Playoffs					
Season	Games	Won	Lost	OTL	SOL	Points	PCT	Goals for	Goals against	Standing	Year	Prelims	1st round	2nd round	3rd round	Finals
2021–22	76	34	32	6	4	78	.513	202	209	5th, Atlantic	2022	L, 1–2, WBS	—	—	—	—
2022–23	72	44	19	5	4	97	.674	217	184	2nd, Atlantic	2023	BYE	W, 3–1, CHA	W, 3–0, HAR	W, 4–2, ROC	W, 4–3, CV
2023–24	72	53	14	0	5	111	.771	229	151	1st, Atlantic	2024	BYE	W, 3–1, LV	W, 3–0, HAR	W, 4–3, CLE	W, 4–2, CV
2024–25	72	44	20	7	1	96	.667	234	211	1st, Atlantic	2025	BYE	W, 3–2, LV	L, 0–3, CHA	—	—
2025–26	72	32	31	6	3	73	.507	210	230	5th, Atlantic	2026	BYE	L, 1–3, WBS	—	—	—

== Players ==
=== Current roster ===
Updated November 9, 2026.

No.	Nat	Player	Pos	S/G	Age	Acquired	Birthplace	Contract
2	(Canada)	Cam Allen	D	R	21	2025	Toronto, Ontario	Capitals
55	(United States)	Joey Anderson (PTO)	RW	R	28	2026	Roseville, Minnesota	Bears
7	(United States)	Louie Belpedio (C)	D	R	30	2025	Skokie, Illinois	Capitals
43	(Canada)	Sam Bitten	C	L	26	2025	Ottawa, Ontario	Bears
22	(United States)	Jonny Brodzinski	RW	R	33	2026	Ham Lake, Minnesota	Capitals
5	(United States)	Ryan Chesley	D	R	22	2025	Mahtomedi, Minnesota	Capitals
20	(Canada)	Andrew Cristall	LW	L	21	2025	Vancouver, British Columbia	Capitals
19	(United States)	Grant Cruikshank	C	L	28	2024	Delafield, Wisconsin	Bears
21	(United States)	Josh Dunne	C	L	27	2026	O'Fallon, Missouri	Capitals
35	(United States)	Mitch Gibson	G	L	27	2023	Phoenixville, Pennsylvania	Capitals
48	(Canada)	David Gucciardi	D	L	24	2025	Toronto, Ontario	Capitals
15	(Canada)	Lynden Lakovic	LW	L	19	2026	Kelowna, British Columbia	Capitals
26	(United States)	Jacob MacDonald (A)	D	L	33	2026	Portland, Oregon	Capitals
13	(Latvia)	Eriks Mateiko	LW	L	20	2025	Jelgava, Latvia	Capitals
47	(United States)	Jon McDonald	D	L	28	2023	Livonia, Michigan	Bears
42	(Canada)	Dylan McIlrath	D	R	34	2021	Winnipeg, Manitoba	Capitals
34	(Switzerland)	Leon Muggli	D	L	20	2025	Cham, Switzerland	Capitals
12	(Sweden)	Theodor Niederbach	C	R	24	2026	Bjästa, Sweden	Capitals
18	(Canada)	Terik Parascak	RW	R	20	2026	Lethbridge, Alberta	Capitals
40	(United States)	Cal Petersen	G	R	32	2026	Waterloo, Iowa	Bears
36	(Czech Republic)	Petr Sikora	C	L	20	2026	Karvina, Czech Republic	Capitals
11	(Canada)	Spencer Smallman (A)	RW	R	30	2024	Summerside, Prince Edward Island	Capitals
37	(Canada)	Dalton Smith	LW	L	34	2024	Oshawa, Ontario	Bears
45	(Canada)	Matthew Strome	LW	L	27	2022	Mississauga, Ontario	Bears
41	(Sweden)	Alexander Suzdalev	LW	L	22	2023	Khabarovsk, Russia	Capitals
39	(Canada)	Patrick Thomas	C	L	22	2025	Oakville, Ontario	Capitals
44	(Russia)	Bogdan Trineyev	LW	R	24	2023	Voronezh, Russia	Capitals

=== Retired numbers ===
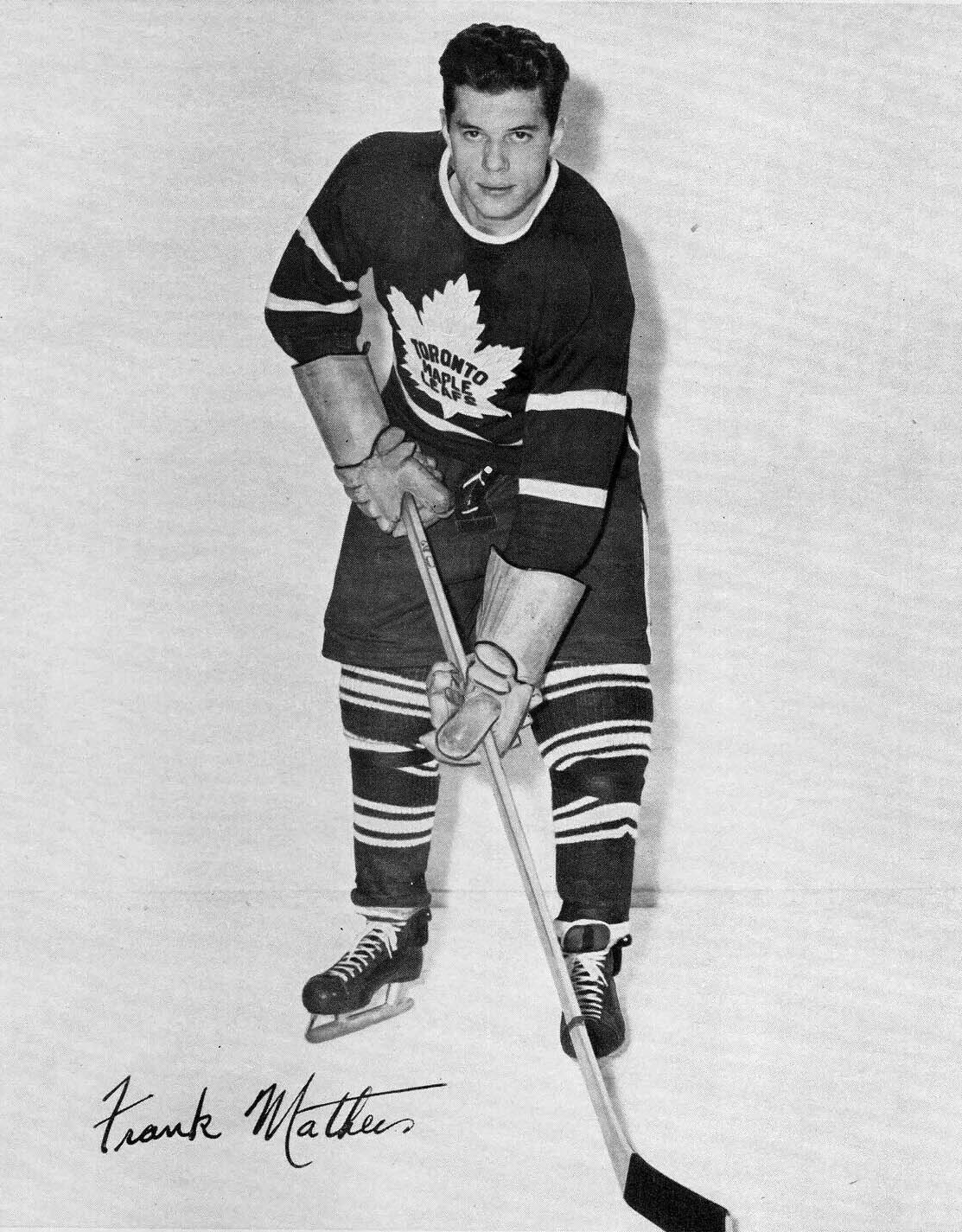
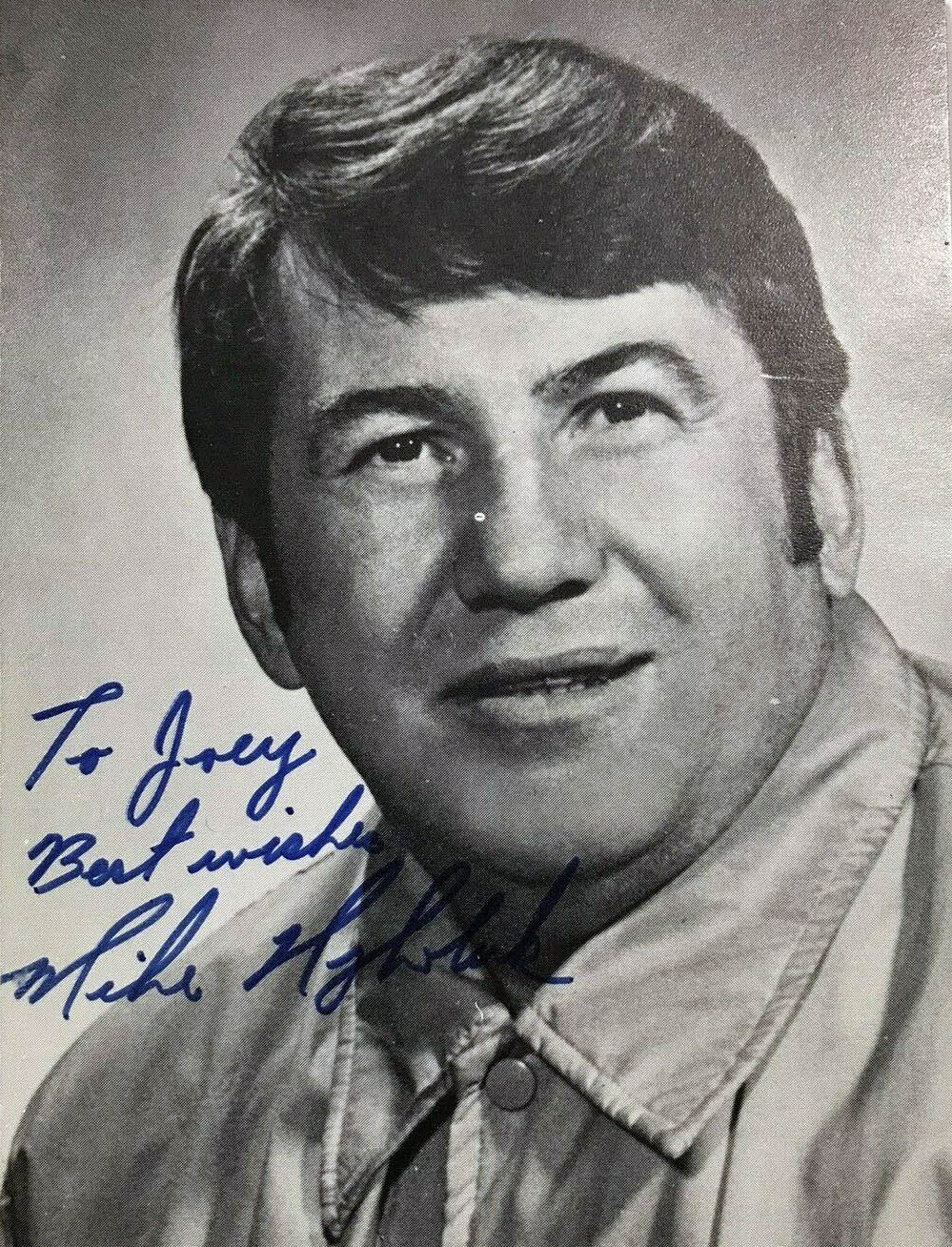
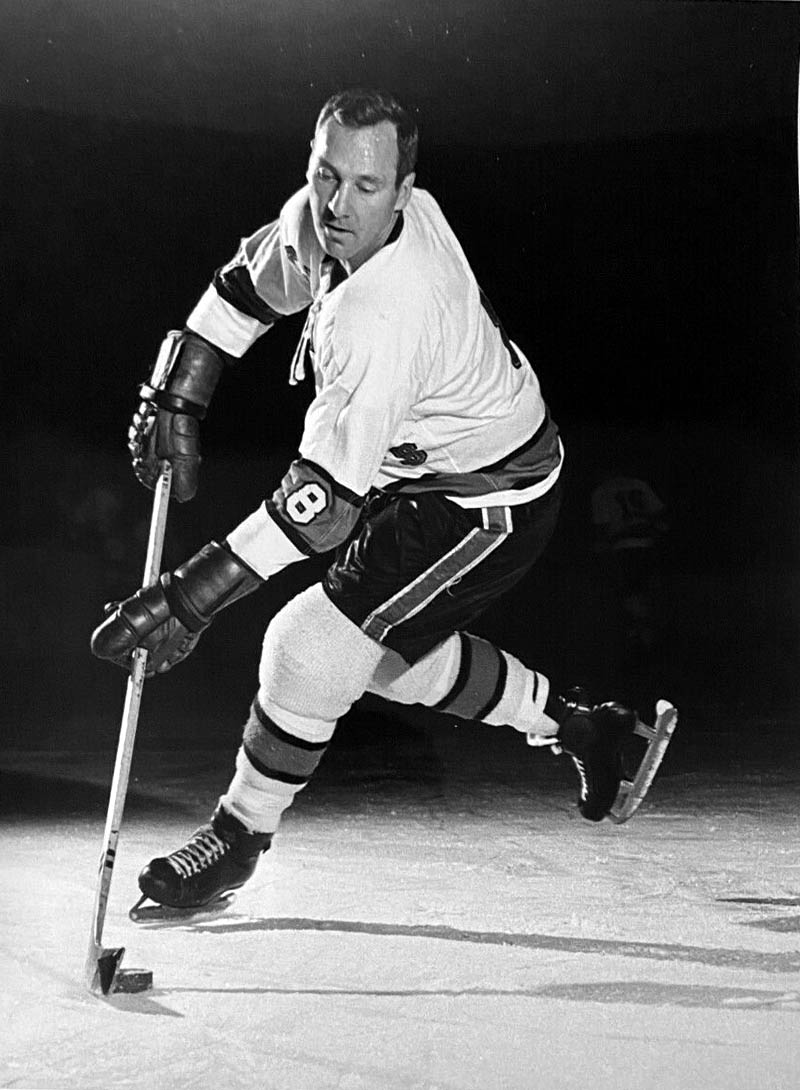
From left to right: Frank Mathers, Mike Nykoluk, and Willie Marshall, some of the players to have their numbers retired (3, 8, and 16, respectively)

No.	Player	Position	Career
3	Frank Mathers; Ralph Keller	D	1956–1962; 1963–1974
8	Mike Nykoluk	C	1958–1972
9	Arnie Kullman; Tim Tookey	C	1948–1960; 1980–1995
16	Willie Marshall; Mitch Lamoureux	C	1956–1963; 1980–1995
17	Chris Bourque	LW	2005–2010; 2011–2012; 2015–2018

=== Team captains ===
- Sammy McManus, 1938-39
- Wally Kilrea, 1940–1944
- Hank Lauzon, Pat Patterson (co-captains after Kilrea left team for wartime obligations), 1943-44
- Peggy O'Neill, 1944-46
- Gordie Bruce, 1946-48
- Herb Cain, 1948–1950
- Frank Mario, 1950-52
- Andy Branigan, 1952-54
- Ellard O'Brien, 1954–1959
- Bucky Hollingworth, 1960–1962
- Marc Reaume, 1962–1963
- Mike Nykoluk, 1963–1972
- Ralph Keller, 1972–1974
- Bill Inglis, 1974–1975, 1976–77
- Steve Cardwell, 1975-76
- Steve Andrascik, 1977-78
- Fred Stanfield, 1978-79
- Ron Schock (named captain following hiring of Stanfield as head coach), 1978-79
- Doug Gibson, 1979-80
- Bob Bilodeau (named captain following hiring of Gibson as head coach), 1979-80
- Claude Noel, 1980–1981
- Tony Cassolato, 1981–1983
- Jay Johnston, 1983-84
- Peter Dineen, 1984–1985
- Don Nachbaur, 1985–1987
- David Fenyves, 1987–1993
- Shawn McCosh, 1995–1996
- Mike McHugh, 1996–1998
- Brad Larsen, 1998–2001
- Kelly Fairchild, 2001–2002
- Brent Thompson, 2002–2003
- D. J. Smith, 2003–2004
- Brett Clark, 2004–2005
- Boyd Kane, 2005–2006
- Lawrence Nycholat, Dean Arsene, Alexandre Giroux (co-captains), 2006–2007
- Quintin Laing, Dean Arsene, 2007–2008
- Bryan Helmer, 2008–2010
- Andrew Joudrey, 2010–2011
- Boyd Kane, 2011–2013
- Dane Byers, 2013–2015
- Garrett Mitchell, 2015–2018
- Matt Moulson, 2021–2022
- Dylan McIlrath, 2022–2024
- Aaron Ness, 2024–2026
- Louie Belpedio, 2026–present

=== Hockey Hall of Fame members ===
- Emile Francis (goaltender, 1943–44), enshrined 1982 (builder)
- Frank Mathers (defenseman/coach, 1956–1962; coach, 1962–73; general manager/president, 1973–1991), enshrined 1992 (builder)
- Craig Patrick (defenseman, 1977–78), enshrined 2001 (builder)
- Walter "Babe" Pratt (defenseman, 1946–48), enshrined 1966 (player)
- Jim Rutherford (goaltender, 1971–72), enshrined 2019 (builder)
- Ralph "Cooney" Weiland (coach, 1941–1945), enshrined 1971 (player)

=== AHL Hall of Fame members ===
- Willie Marshall, C, 1956–63, Elected 2006
- Frank Mathers, D, 1956–62; Coach, 1956–73 and 1984–85; President/GM 1973–91. Elected 2006
- Mike Nykoluk, C, 1958–72, Elected 2007
- Gilles Mayer, G, 1956–59, Elected 2007
- Tim Tookey, C, 1980–81, 1985–87, and 1989–95, Elected 2008
- Bruce Boudreau, Coach, 2005–07, Elected 2009
- Mitch Lamoureux, C, 1986–89, 1993–95, and 1997–99, Elected 2011
- John Paddock Coach, 1985–89, Elected 2011
- John Stevens, D, 1986–90, Elected 2012
- Frederic Cassivi, G 1999–02 and 2005–08, Elected 2015
- Bryan Helmer, D, 2008–10, Elected 2017
- Doug Yingst, Executive, 1982–2016, Elected 2017
- Don Biggs, C, 1987–90, Elected 2018
- Keith Aucoin, C, 2008–12, Elected 2022
- David Creighton, C, 1948–49 and 1950–52, Elected 2022
- Dennis Bonvie, C, 2003–05, Elected 2024
- Gerry Ehman, C, 1958–59, Elected 2024
- Dunc Fisher, RW, 1952–60, Elected 2025
- Chris Bourque, RW, 2005–10, 2011-12, and 2015-18, Elected 2026
- Alexandre Giroux, RW, 2006–10, Elected 2026
- Wendell Young, G, 1987–88, Elected 2026

=== Hershey Bears Hockey Club Hall of Fame members ===
Since 2012, the Hershey Bears have recognized a class of individuals for their outstanding contributions to the game of hockey in Hershey and who were an integral part in the success of the Hershey Bears franchise. The Hershey Bears Hockey Club Hall of Fame is housed on the Giant Center concourse.

Class	Name	Position	Seasons associated with Bears
2012	Lloyd S. Blinco	Builder	1932–1973
2012	Arthur Fausnacht	Official	1955–2004
2012	Ralph Keller	Player	1963–1974
2012	Willie Marshall	Player	1956–1963
2012	Frank Mathers	Player-Builder	1956–1991
2012	Mike Nykoluk	Player	1958–1972
2012	John B. Sollenberger	General	1931–1949
2013	Gordon "Red" Henry	Player	1944–1955
2013	Arnie Kullman	Player	1948–1960
2013	Tim Tookey	Player	1980–1982, 1985–1987, 1989–1994
2013	Kenneth V. Hatt	Builder	1941–1993
2013	J. Bruce McKinney	Builder	1966–2000
2014	Dunc Fisher	Player	1952–1960
2014	Jeannot "Gil" Gilbert	Player	1965–1973
2014	Nick Damore	Player	1939–1946
2014	Brent Hancock	General	1938–1982
2014	Arthur Whiteman	Builder	1962–1973
2015	Roger DeJordy	Player	1962–1970
2015	Howie Yanosik	Player	1957–1967
2015	Larry Zeidel	Player	1955–1963
2015	William "Scotty" Alexander	General	1945–1973
2016	Mitch Lamoureux	Player	1986–1989, 1993–1995, 1997–1999
2016	Mike Mahoney	Player	1961–1971
2016	Bobby Perreault	Player	1957–1962
2016	Charles "Chuck" Hamilton	Player-Builder	1963–1970, 1973–1979
2017	Dave Fenyves	Player	1987–1993
2017	Andre Gill	Player	1962–1972
2017	Doug Yingst	Builder	1982–2016
2017	Randy Waybright	General	1967–2016
2018	Andy Branigan	Player	1945–1954
2018	Ellard "Obie" O'Brien	Player	1951–1959
2018	George "Red" Sullivan	Player	1949–1954
2018	Mitch Grand	General	1936–1980
2019	Don Biggs	Player	1987–1990
2019	Ross Fitzpatrick	Player	1984–1990
2019	Wally Kilrea	Player	1938–1944
2019	Frank Mario	Player	1941–1942, 1945–1952
2019	John Paddock	Builder	1985–1989
2019	Steve Summers	General	1976–1993
2021	Barry Ashbee	Player	1962–1970
2021	Frederic Cassivi	Player	1999–2002, 2005–2008
2021	John Henderson	Player	1954–1955, 1966–1970
2021	Myron Stankiewicz	Player	1961–1968
2021	John Travers	General	1950–1981
2022	Keith Aucoin	Player	2008–2012
2022	Brian Dobbin	Player	1985–1991
2022	Don Foreman	Official	1960–1983
2022	Gregg Mace	General	1979–2019
2023	Tony Cassolato	Player	1979–1983
2023	Bruce Cline	Player	1963–1968
2023	Mark Lofthouse	Player	1977–1981, 1987–1989
2023	Don Scott	General	1969–2023
2024	Lou Franceschetti	Player	1979–1984
2024	Michel Harvey	Player	1963–1971
2024	Mike Stothers	Player	1984–1996
2024	Mark French	Builder	2008–2013
2025	Chris Bourque	Player	2005–2012, 2015–2018
2025	Alexandre Giroux	Player	2006–2010
2025	Boyd Kane	Player	2005–2006, 2009–2013
2025	Mike McHugh	Player	1993–1998
2025	William W. "Tiny" Parry	General	1933–late 1970s
2026	Dean Arsene	Player	2003–2009
2026	Jay Johnston	Player	1979–1984
2026	Christian Matte	Player	1996–2000
2026	Kevin Black	General	1993–2025

== Individual award winners ==
Les Cunningham Award (league MVP)

- George Sullivan: 1953–54
- Mike Nykoluk: 1966–67
- Tim Tookey: 1986–87
- Jean-Francois Labbe: 1996–97
- Alexandre Giroux: 2008–09
- Keith Aucoin: 2009–10
- Chris Bourque: 2015–16

John B. Sollenberger Trophy (leading point scorer)

- George Sullivan: 1953–54 (Note: The award was known as the Carl Liscombe Trophy in 1953–54.)
- Willie Marshall: 1957–58
- Jeannot Gilbert: 1968–69
- Jean-Guy Gratton: 1975–76
- Mark Lofthouse: 1980–81
- Tim Tookey: 1986–87
- Christian Matte: 1999–00
- Alexandre Giroux: 2008–09
- Keith Aucoin: 2009–10
- Chris Bourque: 2011–12, 2015–16

Jack A Butterfield Trophy (playoffs MVP)

- Tim Tookey: 1985–86
- Wendell Young: 1987–88
- Mike McHugh: 1996–97
- Frederic Cassivi: 2005–06
- Michal Neuvirth: 2008–09
- Chris Bourque: 2009–10
- Hunter Shepard: 2022–23
- Hendrix Lapierre: 2023–24

Willie Marshall Award (leading goal scorer)

- Alexandre Giroux: 2008–09, 2009–10

Dudley "Red" Garrett Memorial Award (rookie of the year)

- Ron Hextall: 1985–86
- Ilya Protas: 2025–26

Eddie Shore Award (best defensemen)

- Marc Reaume: 1962–63
- Dave Fenyves: 1987–88, 1988–89

Aldege "Baz" Bastien Memorial Award (best goaltender)

- Wendell Young: 1987–88
- Frederic Chabot: 1993–94
- Jean-Francois Labbe: 1996–97
- Hunter Shepard: 2023–24

Hap Holmes Memorial Award (goalies with lowest goals against average)

- Bob Perreault: 1958–59
- Andre Gill: 1966–67
- Jean-Francois Labbe: 1996–97
- Hunter Shepard and Clay Stevenson: 2023–24

Louis A. R. Pieri Memorial Award (coach of the year)

- Frank Mathers: 1968–69
- Chuck Hamilton: 1975–76
- Doug Gibson: 1979–80
- John Paddock: 1987–88 (shared award with Mike Milbury)
- Spencer Carbery: 2020–21
- Todd Nelson: 2023–24

Fred T. Hunt Memorial Award (sportsmanship, determination and dedication to hockey)

- Tony Cassolato: 1980–81
- Tim Tookey: 1993–94
- Mitch Lamoureux: 1998–99

AHL First Team All-Star

- Walter Kalbfleisch: 1938–39, 1939–40
- Harry Frost: 1940–41, 1941–42, 1942–43
- Roger Jenkins: 1942–43
- Wally Kilrea: 1942–43
- Nick Damore: 1943–44, 1944–45, 1945–46
- Gaston Gauthier: 1943–44
- Hank Lauzon: 1943–44
- Bill Moe: 1943–44
- Joe Bell: 1945–46
- Red Sullivan: 1953–54
- Dunc Fisher: 1957–58
- Willie Marshall: 1957–58
- Marc Reaume: 1962–63
- Roger DeJordy: 1966–67
- Andre Gill: 1966–67
- Mike Nykoluk: 1967–68
- Jeannot Gilbert: 1968–69
- Michel Harvey: 1968–69
- Ralph Keller: 1968–69
- Jean-Guy Gratton: 1975–76
- Mark Lofthouse: 1980–81
- Ron Hextall: 1985–86
- Kevin McCarthy: 1985–86
- Tim Tookey: 1986–87
- Dave Fenyves: 1987–88, 1988–89
- Wendell Young: 1987–88
- Brian Dobbin: 1988–89
- Blair Atcheynum: 1996–97
- Jean-Francois Labbe: 1996–97
- Serge Aubin: 1999–00
- Christian Matte: 1999–00
- Eric Perrin: 2003–04
- Keith Aucoin: 2008–09, 2009–10, 2011–12
- Alexandre Giroux: 2008–09, 2009–10
- Chris Bourque: 2011–12, 2015–16
- Hunter Shepard: 2023–24

AHL Second Team All-Star

- Alfie Moore: 1938–39
- Bob Goldham: 1941–42
- Hank Lauzon: 1942–43
- Billy Gooden: 1944–45
- Norm Larson: 1945–46
- Harvey Bennett: 1946–47
- Lorne Ferguson: 1953–54
- Dunc Fisher: 1953–54, 1954–55, 1955–56, 1956–57
- Dick Gamble: 1954–55
- Murray Henderson: 1954–55
- Frank Mathers: 1957–58
- Bob Perreault: 1957–58, 1958–59, 1961–62
- Larry Zeidel: 1958–59
- Howie Yanosik: 1960–61
- Willie Marshall: 1961–62
- Gene Ubriaco: 1965–66
- Mike Nykoluk: 1966–67
- Wayne Rivers: 1966–67
- Roger DeJordy: 1967–68
- Stan Gilbertson: 1970–71
- Bob Leiter: 1970–71
- Ralph Keller: 1972–73
- Duane Rupp: 1973–74
- Don Edwards: 1975–76
- Bob Bilodeau: 1977–78, 1978–79
- Rollie Boutin: 1980–81
- Tony Cassolato: 1980–81, 1982–83
- Greg Theberge: 1980–81
- Dave Parro: 1982–83
- Ross Fitzpatrick: 1985–86, 1989–90
- Tim Tookey: 1985–86, 1991–92
- Brian Dobbin: 1989–90
- Bob Wilkie: 1993–94
- Jim Montgomery: 1995–96
- Pascal Trepanier: 1996–97
- Mike Gaul: 1999–00
- Andrew Gordon: 2009–10
- Keith Aucoin: 2010–11
- Jeff Taffe: 2012–13
- Travis Boyd: 2016–17
- Aaron Ness: 2018–19
- Ethan Bear: 2024–25

== Head coaches ==
Asterisk (*) denotes number of Calder Cups won

- Herb Mitchell, 1938–1941
- Ralph Weiland, 1941–1945
- Don Penniston, 1945–1950*
- Johnny Crawford, 1950–1952
- Murray Henderson, 1952–1956
- Frank Mathers, 1956–1973***
- Chuck Hamilton, 1973–1979*
- Fred Stanfield, 1979
- Gary Green/Doug Gibson, 1979–80*
- Bryan Murray, 1980–81/1982
- Gary Inness, 1981/1982–1984/1985
- Frank Mathers/Bill Barber, 1984–85
- John Paddock, 1985–1989*
- Kevin McCarthy, 1989–90
- Mike Eaves, 1990–1993
- Jay Leach, 1993–1995
- Bill Barber, 1995–96
- Bob Hartley, 1996–1998*
- Mike Foligno, 1998–2003
- Paul Fixter, 2003–2005
- Bruce Boudreau, 2005–2007*
- Bob Woods, 2007–2009*
- Mark French, 2009–2013*
- Mike Haviland, 2013–14
- Troy Mann, 2014–2018
- Spencer Carbery, 2018–2021
- Scott Allen, 2021–2022
- Todd Nelson, 2022–2025**
- Derek King, 2025–present

== Bibliography ==
- Leone, Tim (2003). The Hershey Bears: Sweet Seasons (Images of Sports). Arcadia. ISBN 978-0738513331.
