= Paul Fixter =

Canadian ice hockey coach

- Born: Kitchener, Ontario, Canada
- Position: Head coach
- Playing career: 1982–1983

Paul Fixter is a Canadian ice hockey coach. He formerly served as head coach of the Sudbury Wolves of the Ontario Hockey League. Fixter was fired by the Wolves on January 3, 2015. Fixter was an assistant coach with the Colorado Avalanche of the National Hockey League from 1995 to 2001.

Fixter has also served as the head coach of the Rio Grande Valley Killer Bees of the Central Hockey League, and as the head coach of the Hershey Bears of the American Hockey League.
