= Howie Yanosik =

Canadian ice hockey player

- Born: January 26, 1933 (age 92); Bracken, Saskatchewan, Canada
- Height: 5 ft 10 in (178 cm)
- Weight: 160 lb (73 kg; 11 st 6 lb)
- Position: Defense
- Shot: Right
- Played for: Hershey Bears
- Playing career: 1950–1967

Howard George Yanosik (born January 26, 1933) is a Canadian retired professional hockey player who played 605 games for the Hershey Bears in the American Hockey League.
