= Tony Cassolato =

Canadian ice hockey player

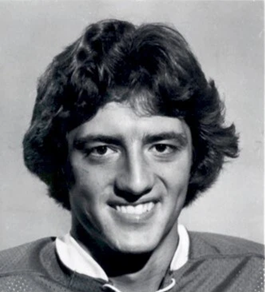
- Cassolato in 1978 photo
- Born: May 7, 1956 (age 69) Guelph, Ontario, Canada
- Height: 5 ft 11 in (180 cm)
- Weight: 180 lb (82 kg; 12 st 12 lb)
- Position: Right wing
- Shot: Right
- Played for: San Diego Mariners; Birmingham Bulls; Washington Capitals; SC Riessersee; HC Brunico
- NHL draft: Undrafted
- WHA draft: Undrafted
- Playing career: 1976–1985

Anthony Gerry Cassolato (born May 7, 1956) is a Canadian former professional ice hockey right winger. He played 23 games in the National Hockey League from 1979 to 1982 and 184 games in the World Hockey Association from 1976 to 1979. Cassolato was born in Guelph, Ontario.

== Playing career ==
Cassolato began his professional career in 1976 in the World Hockey Association, first with the San Diego Mariners and then the Birmingham Bulls. After the WHA folded in 1979, he was signed as a free agent by the Washington Capitals, where he spent parts of three seasons from 1979 to 1982. He later played one season each in the German Eishockey-Bundesliga and Italian Hockey League before retiring in 1985.

== Career statistics ==
=== Regular season and playoffs ===
			Regular season					Playoffs
Season	Team	League	GP	G	A	Pts	PIM	GP	G	A	Pts	PIM
1972–73	Guelph Biltmores	SOJHL	—	—	—	—	—	—	—	—	—	—
1973–74	Peterborough Petes	OHA	68	11	32	43	47	—	—	—	—	—
1974–75	Peterborough Petes	OMJHL	70	43	41	84	52	11	3	5	8	15
1975–76	Peterborough Petes	OMJHL	60	26	39	65	59	—	—	—	—	—
1976–77	San Diego Mariners	WHA	43	13	12	25	26	3	0	0	0	4
1976–77	Charlotte Checkers	SHL	19	9	10	19	18	—	—	—	—	—
1977–78	Birmingham Bulls	WHA	77	18	25	43	59	4	0	0	0	4
1978–79	Birmingham Bulls	WHA	64	13	7	20	62	—	—	—	—	—
1978–79	Binghamton Dusters	AHL	6	1	1	2	0	—	—	—	—	—
1979–80	Washington Capitals	NHL	9	0	2	2	0	—	—	—	—	—
1979–80	Hershey Bears	AHL	73	21	33	54	45	16	6	15	21	6
1980–81	Washington Capitals	NHL	2	0	0	0	0	—	—	—	—	—
1980–81	Hershey Bears	AHL	74	48	46	94	23	10	7	7	14	2
1981–82	Washington Capitals	NHL	12	1	4	5	4	—	—	—	—	—
1981–82	Hershey Bears	AHL	54	29	37	66	56	5	3	5	8	2
1982–83	Hershey Bears	AHL	75	53	38	91	22	5	0	3	3	0
1983–84	SC Riessersee	GER	36	23	18	41	37	—	—	—	—	—
1984–84	HC Brunico	ITA	26	29	30	59	37	6	6	4	10	6
WHA totals			184	44	44	88	147	7	0	0	0	8
NHL totals			23	1	6	7	4	—	—	—	—	—

=== International ===
Year	Team	Event	GP	G	A	Pts	PIM
1974	Canada	WJC	5	0	1	1	0
Junior totals			5	0	1	1	0
