= Ralph Keller =

Canadian ice hockey player

- Born: February 6, 1936 Wilkie, Saskatchewan, Canada
- Died: March 8, 2018 (aged 82) Lebanon, Pennsylvania, U.S.
- Height: 5 ft 9 in (175 cm)
- Weight: 174 lb (79 kg; 12 st 6 lb)
- Position: Defence
- Shot: Right
- Played for: New York Rangers; Hershey Bears
- Playing career: 1954–1974

Raphael J. Keller (February 6, 1936 – March 8, 2018) was a Canadian professional ice hockey player. He played three games in the National Hockey League for the New York Rangers during the 1962–63 season. The rest of his career, which lasted from 1954 to 1974, was spent in the minor leagues, mainly with the Hershey Bears of the American Hockey League. Keller was the captain of the Bears in from 1971 to 1974. His number was retired by the Bears.

== Career statistics ==
=== Regular season and playoffs ===
			Regular season					Playoffs
Season	Team	League	GP	G	A	Pts	PIM	GP	G	A	Pts	PIM
1952–53	Prince Albert Mintos	SJHL	1	0	0	0	0	—	—	—	—	—
1953–54	Prince Albert Mintos	SJHL	48	7	21	28	83	15	1	1	2	34
1954–55	Saskatoon Quakers	WHL	1	0	1	1	0	—	—	—	—	—
1954–55	Prince Albert Mintos	SJHL	48	12	16	28	93	10	3	3	6	14
1955–56	Saskatoon Quakers	WHL	4	0	0	0	2	3	0	0	0	2
1955–56	Prince Albert Mintos	SJHL	50	20	35	55	56	12	6	7	13	12
1956–57	Vancouver Canucks	WHL	68	6	15	21	75	5	0	1	1	4
1957–58	Saskatoon/St. Paul Regals	WHL	34	5	10	15	51	—	—	—	—	—
1957–58	Providence Reds	AHL	31	1	7	8	22	—	—	—	—	—
1958–59	Saskatoon Quakers	WHL	64	6	17	23	70	—	—	—	—	—
1959–60	Vancouver Canucks	WHL	70	12	19	31	102	11	2	4	6	16
1960–61	Vancouver Canucks	WHL	70	9	31	40	95	9	2	3	5	6
1961–62	Los Angeles Blades	WHL	70	17	38	55	136	—	—	—	—	—
1962–63	New York Rangers	NHL	3	1	0	1	6	—	—	—	—	—
1962–63	Baltimore Clippers	AHL	71	7	23	30	133	3	0	0	0	8
1963–64	Hershey Bears	AHL	61	5	20	25	102	6	1	2	3	10
1964–65	Hershey Bears	AHL	72	7	32	39	166	15	1	3	4	38
1965–66	Hershey Bears	AHL	45	5	14	19	91	—	—	—	—	—
1966–67	Hershey Bears	AHL	69	11	33	44	109	5	0	4	4	6
1967–68	Hershey Bears	AHL	70	11	35	46	126	5	1	1	2	4
1968–69	Hershey Bears	AHL	74	9	46	55	104	11	3	4	7	38
1969–70	Hershey Bears	AHL	62	13	21	34	94	7	1	3	4	21
1970–71	Hershey Bears	AHL	70	17	22	39	81	4	1	0	1	15
1971–72	Hershey Bears	AHL	67	8	26	34	100	4	0	1	1	2
1972–73	Hershey Bears	AHL	73	9	33	42	103	7	1	5	6	8
1973–74	Hershey Bears	AHL	74	8	23	31	99	10	2	1	3	6
AHL totals			839	111	335	446	1330	77	11	24	35	156
NHL totals			3	1	0	1	6	—	—	—	—	—
