= Michel Harvey =

Canadian ice hockey player and coach

- Born: January 31, 1937 Alma, Quebec, Canada
- Died: February 12, 2017 (aged 80)
- Height: 5 ft 10 in (178 cm)
- Weight: 175 lb (79 kg; 12 st 7 lb)
- Position: Centre
- Shot: Left
- Played for: WHA; Quebec Nordiques; AHL; Quebec Aces; Hershey Bears; WHL; San Francisco Seals; NAHL; Maine Nordiques
- NHL draft: Undrafted
- Playing career: 1959–1974

Michel Harvey (January 31, 1937 – 12 February 2017) was a Canadian professional ice hockey player and coach. He played a large part of his career in the minor leagues, most notably with the Hershey Bears. He was inducted to the Hershey Bears Hockey Club Hall of Fame in 2024. He coached the Maine Nordiques in the 1974-75 AHL season, where he resigned in November 1974.

During the 1972–73 season, Harvey played 40 games in the World Hockey Association with the Quebec Nordiques.

== Career statistics ==
=== Regular season and playoffs ===
			Regular season					Playoffs
Season	Team	League	GP	G	A	Pts	PIM	GP	G	A	Pts	PIM
1957–58	Chicoutimi Sagueneens	QHL	60	11	15	26	38	––	––	––	––	––
1958–59	Chicoutimi Sagueneens	QHL	62	11	28	39	42	––	––	––	––	––
1959–60	Quebec Aces	AHL	72	15	22	37	92	––	––	––	––	––
1960–61	Quebec Aces	AHL	67	20	35	55	75	––	––	––	––	––
1961–62	Quebec Aces	AHL	70	27	39	66	39	––	––	––	––	––
1962–63	Quebec Aces	AHL	66	18	31	49	25	––	––	––	––	––
1963–64	Hershey Bears	AHL	71	20	39	59	38	6	1	1	2	0
1964–65	Hershey Bears	AHL	70	23	34	57	26	15	2	6	8	6
1965–66	San Francisco Seals	WHL	61	23	34	57	24	7	2	1	3	2
1966–67	Hershey Bears	AHL	56	13	19	32	24	5	0	1	1	2
1967–68	Hershey Bears	AHL	60	21	27	48	12	5	0	2	2	2
1968–69	Hershey Bears	AHL	74	41	52	93	29	11	2	4	6	4
1969–70	Hershey Bears	AHL	48	16	25	41	18	––	––	––	––	––
1970–71	Hershey Bears	AHL	72	24	40	64	20	4	2	0	2	5
1972–73	Quebec Nordiques	WHA	40	6	13	19	14	––	––	––	––	––
1973–74	Maine Nordiques	NAHL	26	9	26	35	36	––	––	––	––	––
WHA totals			40	6	13	19	14	—	—	—	—	—
