= Ellard O'Brien =

Canadian ice hockey player

- Born: May 27, 1930; St. Catharines, Ontario, Canada
- Died: November 27, 2011 (aged 81); St. Catharines, Ontario, Canada
- Height: 6 ft 3 in (191 cm)
- Weight: 183 lb (83 kg; 13 st 1 lb)
- Position: Defence
- Shot: Left
- Played for: Boston Bruins
- Playing career: 1950–1962

Ellard John "Obie" O'Brien (May 27, 1930 – November 27, 2011) was a Canadian professional ice hockey player who played two games in the National Hockey League for the Boston Bruins during the 1955–56 season. The rest of his career, which lasted from 1950 to 1962, was mainly spent in the minor American Hockey League.

== Career statistics ==
=== Regular season and playoffs ===
			Regular season					Playoffs
Season	Team	League	GP	G	A	Pts	PIM	GP	G	A	Pts	PIM
1948–49	St. Catharines Teepees	OHA	25	9	8	17	20	5	3	3	6	2
1949–50	St. Catharines Teepees	OHA	48	58	43	101	79	5	1	2	3	13
1949–50	Boston Olympics	EAHL	3	1	2	3	0	5	0	1	1	0
1950–51	Tulsa Oilers	USHL	57	33	28	61	38	2	0	1	1	11
1951–52	Hershey Bears	AHL	54	13	28	41	22	5	0	1	1	2
1952–53	Hershey Bears	AHL	61	16	32	48	38	3	0	1	1	2
1953–54	Hershey Bears	AHL	63	20	31	51	23	11	5	9	14	6
1954–55	Hershey Bears	AHL	62	31	38	69	28	—	—	—	—	—
1955–56	Boston Bruins	NHL	2	0	0	0	0	—	—	—	—	—
1955–56	Hershey Bears	AHL	49	12	14	26	71	—	—	—	—	—
1956–57	Hershey Bears	AHL	64	20	35	55	78	7	1	3	4	4
1957–58	Hershey Bears	AHL	65	23	48	71	46	11	4	11	15	6
1958–59	Hershey Bears	AHL	63	16	26	42	48	13	4	3	7	18
1959–60	Quebec Aces	AHL	67	9	19	28	36	—	—	—	—	—
1960–61	Quebec Aces	AHL	68	8	7	15	25	—	—	—	—	—
1961–62	Philadelphia Ramblers	EHL	60	23	32	55	12	3	0	0	0	4
AHL totals			616	168	278	446	415	50	14	28	42	38
NHL totals			2	0	0	0	0	—	—	—	—	—
