= Chuck Hamilton =

Canadian ice hockey player (1939–2023)

- Born: January 18, 1939; Kirkland Lake, Ontario, Canada
- Died: September 17, 2023 (aged 84); Punta Gorda, Florida, U.S.
- Height: 5 ft 11 in (180 cm)
- Weight: 182 lb (83 kg; 13 st 0 lb)
- Position: Right wing
- Shot: Left
- Played for: Montreal Canadiens; St. Louis Blues
- Playing career: 1959–1973

Charles George Hamilton (January 18, 1939 – September 17, 2023) was a Canadian professional ice hockey forward who played four games in the National Hockey League for the Montreal Canadiens and St. Louis Blues during the 1961–62 and 1972–73 seasons. The rest of his career, which lasted from 1959 to 1973, was spent in the minor leagues. Hamilton died in Punta Gorda, Florida on September 17, 2023, at the age of 84.

== Career statistics ==
=== Regular season and playoffs ===
			Regular season					Playoffs
Season	Team	League	GP	G	A	Pts	PIM	GP	G	A	Pts	PIM
1956–57	Peterborough TPT Petes	OHA	52	7	11	18	15	5	1	1	2	4
1957–58	Peterborough TPT Petes	OHA	52	8	14	22	50	19	7	9	16	16
1958–59	Peterborough TPT Petes	OHA	46	18	28	46	47	12	1	3	4	48
1958–59	Peterborough TPT Petes	M-Cup	—	—	—	—	—	12	1	3	4	48
1959–60	Hull-Ottawa Canadiens	EPHL	66	6	13	19	39	7	0	2	2	6
1960–61	Hull-Ottawa Canadiens	EPHL	40	1	7	8	56	14	0	2	2	20
1961–62	Montreal Canadiens	NHL	1	0	0	0	0	—	—	—	—	—
1961–62	Hull-Ottawa Canadiens	EPHL	57	5	9	14	50	11	1	3	4	4
1962–63	Hull-Ottawa Canadiens	EPHL	64	17	33	50	51	3	0	1	1	6
1963–64	Hershey Bears	AHL	72	8	30	38	31	6	0	3	3	2
1964–65	Hershey Bears	AHL	55	7	15	22	47	15	2	0	2	4
1965–66	Hershey Bears	AHL	67	7	16	23	24	3	0	2	2	0
1966–67	Hershey Bears	AHL	62	9	12	21	20	5	0	0	0	0
1967–68	Hershey Bears	AHL	69	8	22	30	65	5	0	1	1	18
1968–69	Hershey Bears	AHL	74	28	46	74	46	11	2	4	6	16
1969–70	Hershey Bears	AHL	60	10	20	30	8	7	1	4	5	0
1971–72	Denver Spurs	WHL	70	14	18	32	29	9	1	3	4	4
1972–73	St. Louis Blues	NHL	3	0	2	2	2	—	—	—	—	—
1972–73	Denver Spurs	WHL	47	7	25	32	64	5	0	0	0	4
AHL totals			459	77	161	238	241	52	5	14	19	40
NHL totals			4	0	2	2	2	—	—	—	—	—
