= 1986–87 AHL season =

- League: American Hockey League
- Sport: Ice hockey

Regular season
- F. G. "Teddy" Oke Trophy: Sherbrooke Canadiens
- Season MVP: Tim Tookey
- Top scorer: Tim Tookey
- MVP: David Fenyves

Playoffs
- Champions: Rochester Americans
- Runners-up: Sherbrooke Canadiens

AHL seasons
- 1985–86 1987–88

The 1986–87 AHL season was the 51st season of the American Hockey League. 13 teams played 80 games each in the schedule. The league institutes awarding one point in the standings, for an overtime loss. The league experimented with a shootout to settle games tied after a scoreless overtime period; the format would not be used again until the 2004–05 season.

The Sherbrooke Canadiens finished first overall in the regular season. The Rochester Americans won their fifth Calder Cup championship.

== Team changes ==
- The St. Catharines Saints move to Newmarket, Ontario, becoming the Newmarket Saints.

== Final standings ==
- y– indicates team clinched division and a playoff spot
- x– indicates team clinched a playoff spot
- e– indicates team was eliminated from playoff contention

North Division	GP	W	L	OTL	Pts	GF	GA
y–Sherbrooke Canadiens (MTL/WIN)	80	50	28	2	102	328	257
x–Adirondack Red Wings (DET)	80	44	31	5	93	329	296
x–Moncton Golden Flames (BOS/CGY)	80	43	31	6	92	338	315
x–Nova Scotia Oilers (CHI/EDM)	80	38	39	3	79	318	315
e–Maine Mariners (NJD)	80	35	40	5	75	272	298
e–Fredericton Express (QUE/VAN)	80	32	43	5	69	292	357

South Division	GP	W	L	OTL	Pts	GF	GA
y–Rochester Americans (BUF)	80	47	26	7	101	315	263
x–Binghamton Whalers (HFD/WSH)	80	47	26	7	101	309	259
x–New Haven Nighthawks (LAK/NYR)	80	44	25	11	99	331	315
x–Hershey Bears (PHI)	80	43	36	1	87	329	309
Baltimore Skipjacks (PIT)	80	35	37	8	78	277	295
e–Springfield Indians (MNS/NYI)	80	34	40	6	74	296	344
e–Newmarket Saints (TOR)	80	28	48	4	60	226	337

== Scoring leaders ==
Note: GP = Games played; G = Goals; A = Assists; Pts = Points; PIM = Penalty minutes

Player	Team	GP	G	A	Pts	PIM
Tim Tookey	Hershey Bears	80	51	73	124	45
Alain Lemieux	Baltimore Skipjacks	72	41	56	97	62
Brett Hull	Moncton Golden Flames	67	50	42	92	16
Mitch Lamoureux	Hershey Bears	78	43	46	89	122
Ross Fitzpatrick	Hershey Bears	66	45	40	85	34
Glenn Merkosky	Adirondack Red Wings	77	54	31	85	66
Ray Allison	Hershey Bears	78	29	55	84	57
Bruce Boudreau	Nova Scotia Oilers	78	35	47	82	40
Serge Boisvert	Sherbrooke Canadiens	78	27	54	81	29
Wes Jarvis	Newmarket Saints	70	28	50	78	32

- complete list

== Calder Cup playoffs ==
Division Semifinals
1	Sherbrooke	4
4	Nova Scotia	1
North Division
2	Adirondack	4
3	Moncton	2
1	Rochester	4
4	Hershey	1
South Division
2	Binghamton	4
3	New Haven	3

Division Finals
1	Sherbrooke	4
2	Adirondack	1
1	Rochester	4
2	Binghamton	2

Calder Cup Final
N1	Sherbrooke	3
S1	Rochester	4

== Trophy and Award winners ==
Team awards

Calder Cup; Playoff champions:	Rochester Americans
F. G. "Teddy" Oke Trophy; Regular Season champions, North Division:	Sherbrooke Canadiens
John D. Chick Trophy; Regular Season champions, South Division:	Rochester Americans

Individual awards

Les Cunningham Award; Most valuable player:	Tim Tookey - Hershey Bears
John B. Sollenberger Trophy; Top point scorer:	Tim Tookey - Hershey Bears
Dudley "Red" Garrett Memorial Award; Rookie of the year:	Brett Hull - Moncton Golden Flames
Eddie Shore Award; Defenceman of the year:	Brad Shaw - Binghamton Whalers
Aldege "Baz" Bastien Memorial Award; Best Goaltender:	Mark Laforest - Adirondack Red Wings
Harry "Hap" Holmes Memorial Award; Lowest goals against average:	Vincent Riendeau - Sherbrooke Canadiens
Louis A.R. Pieri Memorial Award; Coach of the year:	Larry Pleau - Binghamton Whalers
Fred T. Hunt Memorial Award; Sportsmanship / Perseverance:	Glenn Merkosky - Adirondack Red Wings
Jack A. Butterfield Trophy; MVP of the playoffs:	David Fenyves - Rochester Americans

Other awards

James C. Hendy Memorial Award; Most outstanding executive:	Joel Schiavone
James H. Ellery Memorial Awards; Outstanding media coverage:	Joel Jacobson, Nova Scotia, (newspaper); Dave Morrell, Fredericton, (radio); Arnold Klinsky, Rochester, (television)
Ken McKenzie Award; Outstanding marketing executive:	Larry Haley, Moncton Golden Flames

== See also ==
- List of AHL seasons

Preceded by 1985–86 AHL season	AHL seasons	Succeeded by 1987–88 AHL season
