= 1980–81 AHL season =

- League: American Hockey League
- Sport: Ice hockey

Regular season
- F. G. "Teddy" Oke Trophy: Maine Mariners
- Season MVP: Pelle Lindbergh
- Top scorer: Mark Lofthouse

Playoffs
- Champions: Adirondack Red Wings
- Runners-up: Maine Mariners

AHL seasons
- 1979–80 1981–82

The 1980–81 AHL season was the 45th season of the American Hockey League. Nine teams played 80 games each in the schedule. The Hershey Bears finished first overall in the regular season. The Adirondack Red Wings won their first Calder Cup championship.

== Team changes ==
- The Syracuse Firebirds cease operations.
- The Binghamton Dusters become the Binghamton Whalers.
- The Adirondack Red Wings switch divisions from North to South.

== Final standings ==
- y– indicates team clinched division and a playoff spot
- x– indicates team clinched a playoff spot
- e– indicates team was eliminated from playoff contention

North	GP	W	L	T	Pts	GF	GA
y–Maine Mariners (PHI)	80	45	28	7	97	319	292
x–New Brunswick Hawks (CHI/TOR)	80	37	33	10	84	317	298
x–Nova Scotia Voyageurs (MTL/QUE)	80	38	37	5	81	335	298
x–Springfield Indians (BOS)	80	34	41	5	73	312	343

South	GP	W	L	T	Pts	GF	GA
y–Hershey Bears (QUE/WSH)	80	47	24	9	103	357	299
x–Adirondack Red Wings (DET)	80	35	40	5	75	305	328
x–Binghamton Whalers (HFD/PIT)	80	32	42	6	70	296	336
x–New Haven Nighthawks (NYR)	80	29	40	11	69	295	321
e–Rochester Americans (BUF/QUE)	80	30	42	8	68	295	316

== Scoring leaders ==
Note: GP = Games played; G = Goals; A = Assists; Pts = Points; PIM = Penalty minutes

Player	Team	GP	G	A	Pts	PIM
Mark Lofthouse	Hershey Bears	74	48	55	103	131
Dan Daoust	Nova Scotia Voyageurs	80	38	60	98	106
Tony Cassolato	Hershey Bears	74	48	46	94	23
Dave Gorman	Nova Scotia Voyageurs	78	43	47	90	82
Normand Aubin	New Brunswick Hawks	79	43	46	89	99
Guy Carbonneau	Nova Scotia Voyageurs	78	35	53	88	87
Jean-Francois Sauve	Rochester Americans	56	29	54	83	21
Craig Levie	Nova Scotia Voyageurs	80	20	62	82	162
Paul Evans	Maine Mariners	78	28	52	80	49
Reg Thomas	Nova Scotia Voyageurs	74	36	43	79	90

- complete list

== Calder Cup playoffs ==
Division Semifinals
1	Maine	4
4	Springfield	3
North Division
2	New Brunswick	4
3	Nova Scotia	2
1	Hershey	4
4	New Haven	0
South Division
2	Adirondack	4
3	Binghamton	2

Division Finals
1	Maine	4
2	New Brunswick	3
1	Hershey	2
2	Adirondack	4

Calder Cup Final
N1	Maine	2
S2	Adirondack	4

== Trophy and award winners ==
Team awards

Calder Cup; Playoff champions:	Adirondack Red Wings
F. G. "Teddy" Oke Trophy; Regular Season champions, North Division:	Maine Mariners
John D. Chick Trophy; Regular Season champions, South Division:	Hershey Bears

Individual awards

Les Cunningham Award; Most valuable player:	Pelle Lindbergh - Maine Mariners
John B. Sollenberger Trophy; Top point scorer:	Mark Lofthouse - Hershey Bears
Dudley "Red" Garrett Memorial Award; Rookie of the year:	Pelle Lindbergh - Maine Mariners
Eddie Shore Award; Defenceman of the year:	Craig Levie - Nova Scotia Voyageurs
Harry "Hap" Holmes Memorial Award; Lowest goals against average:	Pelle Lindbergh & Robbie Moore - Maine Mariners
Louis A.R. Pieri Memorial Award; Coach of the year:	Bob McCammon - Maine Mariners
Fred T. Hunt Memorial Award; Sportsmanship / Perseverance:	Tony Cassolato - Hershey Bears

Other awards

James C. Hendy Memorial Award; Most outstanding executive:	Ed Anderson
James H. Ellery Memorial Awards; Outstanding media coverage:	Rick Wheeler, Rochester, (newspaper); Russ Small, Hershey, (radio); Simeon Smith, Rochester, (television)
Ken McKenzie Award; Outstanding marketing executive:	Brent Hancock, Hershey Bears

== See also ==
- List of AHL seasons

Preceded by 1979–80 AHL season	AHL seasons	Succeeded by 1981–82 AHL season
