= 1988–89 AHL season =

- League: American Hockey League
- Sport: Ice hockey

Regular season
- F. G. "Teddy" Oke Trophy: Sherbrooke Canadiens
- Season MVP: Stephan Lebeau
- Top scorer: Stephan Lebeau
- MVP: Sam St. Laurent

Playoffs
- Champions: Adirondack Red Wings
- Runners-up: New Haven Nighthawks

AHL seasons
- 1987–88 1989–90

The 1988–89 AHL season was the 53rd season of the American Hockey League. Fourteen teams played 80 games each in the schedule. The league abandoned awarding points for an overtime loss. The Sherbrooke Canadiens finished first overall in the regular season. The Adirondack Red Wings won their third Calder Cup championship.

== Team changes ==
- The Nova Scotia Oilers move to Sydney, Nova Scotia, becoming the Cape Breton Oilers.
- The Fredericton Express move to Halifax, Nova Scotia, becoming the Halifax Citadels.

== Final standings ==
- y– indicates team clinched division and a playoff spot
- x– indicates team clinched a playoff spot
- e– indicates team was eliminated from playoff contention

North Division	GP	W	L	T	Pts	GF	GA
y–Sherbrooke Canadiens (MTL)	80	47	24	9	103	348	261
x–Halifax Citadels (QUE)	80	42	30	8	92	345	300
x–Moncton Hawks (WIN)	80	37	34	9	83	320	313
x–New Haven Nighthawks (LAK)	80	35	35	10	80	325	309
e–Maine Mariners (BOS)	80	32	40	8	72	262	317
e–Springfield Indians (NYI)	80	32	44	4	68	287	341
e–Cape Breton Oilers (EDM)	80	27	47	6	60	308	388

South Division	GP	W	L	T	Pts	GF	GA
y–Adirondack Red Wings (DET)	80	47	27	6	100	369	294
x–Hershey Bears (PHI)	80	40	30	10	90	361	309
x–Utica Devils (NJD)	80	37	34	9	83	309	295
x–Newmarket Saints (TOR)	80	38	36	6	82	339	334
e–Rochester Americans (BUF)	80	38	37	5	81	305	302
e–Baltimore Skipjacks (WSH)	80	30	46	4	64	317	347
e–Binghamton Whalers (HFD)	80	28	46	6	62	307	392

== Scoring leaders ==
Note: GP = Games played; G = Goals; A = Assists; Pts = Points; PIM = Penalty minutes

Player	Team	GP	G	A	Pts	PIM
Stephan Lebeau	Sherbrooke Canadiens	78	70	64	134	47
Murray Eaves	Adirondack Red Wings	80	46	72	118	84
Benoit Brunet	Sherbrooke Canadiens	73	41	76	117	95
Mike Richard	Baltimore Skipjacks	80	44	63	107	51
Don Biggs	Hershey Bears	76	36	67	103	158
Terry Yake	Binghamton Whalers	75	39	56	95	57
Ken Priestlay	Rochester Americans	64	56	37	93	60
Hubie McDonough	New Haven Nighthawks	74	37	55	92	41
Ron Wilson	Moncton Hawks	80	31	61	92	110
Brian Dobbin	Hershey Bears	59	43	48	91	61

- complete list

== Calder Cup playoffs ==
Division Semifinals
1	Sherbrooke	2
4	New Haven	4
North Division
2	Halifax	0
3	Moncton	4
1	Adirondack	4
4	Newmarket	1
South Division
2	Hershey	4
3	Utica	1

Division Finals
4	New Haven	4
3	Moncton	2
1	Adirondack	4
2	Hershey	3

Calder Cup Final
N4	New Haven	1
S1	Adirondack	4

== Trophy and award winners ==
Team awards

Calder Cup; Playoff champions:	Adirondack Red Wings
F. G. "Teddy" Oke Trophy; Regular Season champions, North Division:	Sherbrooke Canadiens
John D. Chick Trophy; Regular Season champions, South Division:	Adirondack Red Wings

Individual awards

Les Cunningham Award; Most valuable player:	Stephan Lebeau – Sherbrooke Canadiens
John B. Sollenberger Trophy; Top point scorer:	Stephan Lebeau – Sherbrooke Canadiens
Dudley "Red" Garrett Memorial Award; Rookie of the year:	Stephan Lebeau – Sherbrooke Canadiens
Eddie Shore Award; Defenceman of the year:	Dave Fenyves – Hershey Bears
Aldege "Baz" Bastien Memorial Award; Best Goaltender:	Randy Exelby – Sherbrooke Canadiens
Harry "Hap" Holmes Memorial Award; Lowest goals against average:	Randy Exelby & Francois Gravel – Sherbrooke Canadiens
Louis A. R. Pieri Memorial Award; Coach of the year:	Tom McVie – Utica Devils
Fred T. Hunt Memorial Award; Sportsmanship / Perseverance:	Murray Eaves – Adirondack Red Wings
Jack A. Butterfield Trophy; MVP of the playoffs:	Sam St. Laurent – Adirondack Red Wings

Other awards

James C. Hendy Memorial Award; Most outstanding executive:	Bruce Landon
James H. Ellery Memorial Awards; Outstanding media coverage:	Paul Abramowitz, Maine, (newspaper); Pat Connolly, Cape Breton, (radio); Brian Lambert, Springfield, (television)
Ken McKenzie Award; Outstanding marketing executive:	John Forslund, Springfield Indians

== See also ==
- List of AHL seasons

Preceded by 1987–88 AHL season	AHL seasons	Succeeded by 1989–90 AHL season
