= List of Hershey Bears seasons =

This is a list of seasons completed by the Hershey Bears of the American Hockey League. This list documents the records and playoff results for all seasons the Bears have completed in the AHL since their inception in 1932.

== Season-by-season record ==
Regular season												Playoffs					
Season	Games	Won	Lost	Tied	OTL	SOL	Points	PCT	Goals for	Goals against	Standing	Year	Preliminary	1st round	Quarterfinals	Semifinals	Finals
1932–33	18	6	11	1	—	—	13	.361	69	58	3rd, TSHL	1933	Data unavailable				
1933–34	23	13	9	1	—	—	27	.587	45	38	3rd, EAHL	1934	Data unavailable				
1934–35	21	10	9	2	—	—	22	.524	56	22	2nd, EAHL	1935	Data unavailable				
1935–36	39	27	10	2	—	—	56	.718	119	78	1st, EAHL	1936	Data unavailable				
1936–37	48	25	15	8	—	—	58	.604	133	105	1st, EAHL	1937	Data unavailable				
1937–38	58	32	15	11	—	—	75	.647	197	135	1st, EAHL	1938	Data unavailable				
1938–39	54	31	18	5	—	—	67	.620	140	110	1st, West	1939	—		BYE	L, 2–3, PHI	—
1939–40	56	27	24	5	—	—	59	.527	154	156	2nd, West	1940	—		W, 2–1, NH	L, 1–2, PIT	—
1940–41	56	24	23	9	—	—	57	.509	193	189	2nd, West	1940	—		W, 2–0, NH	W, 2–1, PIT	L, 2–3, CLE
1941–42	56	33	17	6	—	—	72	.643	207	169	2nd, West	1942	—		W, 2–0, NH	W, 2–1, CLE	L, 2–3, IND
1942–43	56	35	13	8	—	—	78	.696	240	166	1st, East	1943	—		BYE	L, 2–4, BUF	—
1943–44	54	30	16	8	—	—	68	.630	181	133	1st, East	1944	—			L, 3–4, CLE	—
1944–45	60	28	24	8	—	—	64	.533	197	186	2nd, East	1945	—			W, 4–1, IND	L, 2–4, CLE
1945–46	62	26	26	10	—	—	62	.500	213	221	2nd, East	1946	—		L, 1–2, PIT	—	—
1946–47	64	36	16	12	—	—	84	.656	276	174	1st, East	1947	—		BYE	W, 4–0, CLE	W, 4–3, PIT
1947–48	68	25	30	13	—	—	63	.463	240	273	3rd, East	1948	—		L, 1–2, BUF	—	—
1948–49	68	28	35	5	—	—	61	.449	256	261	2nd, East	1949	—		W, 2–0, IND	W, 2–0, CLE	L, 3–4, PRO
1949–50	70	21	39	10	—	—	52	.371	229	310	5th, East	1950	—		Did not qualify		
1950–51	70	38	28	5	—	—	80	.571	256	242	2nd, East	1951	—		W, 3–0, IND	L, 0–3, PIT	—
1951–52	68	35	28	5	—	—	75	.551	256	215	1st, East	1952	—		L, 1–4, PIT	—	—
1952–53	64	31	32	1	—	—	63	.492	208	217	4th, AHL	1953	—			L, 0–3, PIT	—
1953–54	70	37	29	4	—	—	78	.557	274	243	2nd, AHL	1954	—			W, 3–2, PIT	L, 2–3, CLE
1954–55	64	29	28	7	—	—	65	.508	217	225	5th, AHL	1955	—			Did not qualify	
1955–56	64	19	39	6	—	—	44	.344	218	271	5th, AHL	1956	—			Did not qualify	
1956–57	64	32	28	4	—	—	68	.531	223	237	4th, AHL	1957	—			L, 3–4, CLE	—
1957–58	70	39	24	7	—	—	85	.607	241	198	1st, AHL	1958	—			W, 4–1, PRO	W, 4–2, SPR
1958–59	70	32	32	6	—	—	70	.500	200	202	4th, AHL	1959	—			W, 4–3, CLE	W, 4–2, BUF
1959–60	72	28	37	7	—	—	63	.438	226	238	6th, AHL	1960	—			Did not qualify	
1960–61	72	36	32	4	—	—	76	.528	218	210	2nd, AHL	1961	—			W, 3–1, BUF	L, 0–4, SPR
1961–62	70	37	28	5	—	—	79	.564	236	213	2nd, East	1962	—		W, 2–1, PRO	L, 1–3, BUF	—
1962–63	72	36	28	8	—	—	80	.556	262	231	2nd, East	1963	—		W, 2–1, BAL	W, 3–2, CLE	L, 3–4, BUF
1963–64	72	36	31	5	—	—	77	.535	236	249	2nd, East	1964	—		W, 2–1, PRO	L, 0–3, CLE	—
1964–65	72	36	32	4	—	—	76	.528	246	243	2nd, East	1965	—		W, 3–2, BAL	W, 3–2, BUF	L, 1–4, RCH
1965–66	72	37	30	5	—	—	79	.549	268	232	2nd, East	1966	—		L, 0–3, SPR	—	—
1966–67	72	38	24	10	—	—	86	.597	273	216	1st, East	1967	—		L, 1–4, PIT	—	—
1967–68	72	34	30	8	—	—	76	.528	276	248	1st, East	1968	—		L, 1–4, RCH	—	—
1968–69	74	41	27	6	—	—	88	.595	307	234	1st, East	1969	—		W, 4–2, BUF	BYE	W, 4–1, QUE
1969–70	72	28	28	16	—	—	72	.500	247	249	2nd, West	1970	—		L, 3–4, SPR	—	—
1970–71	72	31	31	10	—	—	72	.500	238	212	3rd, West	1971	—		L, 1–3, CLE	—	—
1971–72	76	33	30	13	—	—	79	.520	266	253	2nd, West	1972	—		L, 0–4, CIN	—	—
1972–73	76	42	23	11	—	—	95	.625	326	231	2nd, West	1973	—		L, 3–4, VIR	—	—
1973–74	76	39	23	14	—	—	92	.605	320	241	2nd, South	1974	—		W, 4–1, CIN	W, 4–0, BAL	W, 4–1, PRO
1974–75	76	27	38	10	—	—	64	.427	259	303	3rd, South	1975	—		W, 4–3, RIC	L, 1–4, NH	—
1975–76	76	39	31	6	—	—	84	.553	304	275	1st, South	1976	—		BYE	W, 4–1, RIC	L, 1–4, NS
1976–77	80	36	38	6	—	—	78	.488	282	293	4th, AHL	1977	—			L, 2–4, NS	—
1977–78	81	27	44	10	—	—	64	.395	281	324	4th, South	1978	—		Did not qualify		
1978–79	79	35	36	8	—	—	78	.494	311	324	2nd, South	1979	—		L, 1–3, BNG	—	—
1979–80	80	35	39	6	—	—	76	.475	289	273	2nd, South	1980	—		W, 4–0, SYR	W, 4–2, NH	W, 4–2, NB
1980–81	80	47	24	9	—	—	103	.644	357	299	1st, South	1981	—		W, 4–0, NH	L, 2–4, ADK	—
1981–82	80	36	38	6	—	—	78	.488	316	347	4th, South	1982	—		L, 2–3, BNG	—	—
1982–83	80	40	35	5	—	—	85	.531	313	308	2nd, South	1983	—		L, 1–4, NH	—	—
1983–84	80	28	42	10	—	—	66	.413	320	384	7th, South	1984	—		Did not qualify		
1984–85	80	26	43	11	—	—	63	.394	315	339	6th, South	1985	—		Did not qualify		
1985–86	80	48	29	3	—	—	99	.619	346	292	1st, South	1986	—		W, 4–1, NH	W, 4–3, SCS	L, 2–4, ADK
1986–87	80	43	36	0	1	—	87	.544	329	309	4th, South	1987	—		L, 1–4, RCH	—	—
1987–88	80	50	25	3	2	—	105	.656	343	256	1st, South	1988	—		W, 4–0, BNG	W, 4–0, ADK	W, 4–0, FRD
1988–89	80	40	30	10	0	—	90	.563	361	309	2nd, South	1989	—		W, 4–1, UTI	L, 3–4, ADK	—
1989–90	80	32	38	10	0	—	74	.463	298	296	6th, South	1990	—		Did not qualify		
1990–91	80	33	35	12	0	—	78	.488	313	324	4th, South	1991	—	W, 13–4, (Note: Two-game aggregate score) ADK	L, 1–4, RCH	—	—
1991–92	80	36	33	11	0	—	83	.519	313	337	3rd, South	1992	—	L, 2–4, RCH	—	—	—
1992–93	80	27	41	12	0	—	66	.413	316	339	5th, South	1993	—	Did not qualify			
1993–94	80	38	31	11	0	—	87	.544	306	298	1st, South	1994	—	W, 4–0, RCH	L, 3–4, CRN	—	—
1994–95	80	34	36	10	0	—	78	.488	275	300	3rd, South	1995	—	L, 2–4, CRN	—	—	—
1995–96	80	36	30	11	3	—	86	.538	301	287	2nd, South	1996	—	L, 2–3, BAL	—	—	—
1996–97	80	43	22	10	5	—	101	.631	273	220	2nd, Mid-Atlantic	1997	—	W, 3–1, KEN	W, 4–3, PHI	W, 4–3, SPR	W, 4–1, HAM
1997–98	80	36	31	7	6	—	85	.531	238	235	2nd, Mid-Atlantic	1998	—	W, 3–0, KEN	L, 0–4, PHI	—	—
1998–99	80	37	32	10	1	—	85	.531	242	224	3rd, Mid-Atlantic	1999	—	L, 2–3, KEN	—	—	—
1999–00	80	43	29	5	3	—	94	.588	297	267	2nd, Mid-Atlantic	2000	—	W, 3–2, PHI	W, 4–1, KEN	L, 0–4, RCH	—
2000–01	80	34	39	4	3	—	75	.469	216	234	5th, Mid-Atlantic	2001	—	W, 3–0, KEN	W, 4–1, NOR	L, 0–4, WBS	—
2001–02	80	36	27	11	6	—	89	.556	200	193	2nd, South	2002	BYE	W, 3–1, NOR	L, 0–4, HOU	—	—
2002–03	80	36	27	14	3	—	89	.556	217	209	2nd, South	2003	BYE	L, 2–3, CHI	—	—	—
2003–04	80	33	34	8	5	—	78	.494	203	218	6th, East	2004	Did not qualify				
2004–05	80	39	37	—	2	2	82	.513	207	226	5th, East	2005	—	Did not qualify			
2005–06	80	44	21	—	5	10	103	.644	262	234	2nd, East	2006	—	W, 4–0, NOR	W, 4–0, WBS	W, 4–3, POR	W, 4–2, MIL
2006–07	80	51	17	—	6	6	114	.713	305	219	1st, East	2007	—	W, 4–1 ALB	W, 4–1, WBS	W, 4–0, MAN	L, 1–4, HAM
2007–08	80	42	30	—	2	6	92	.575	253	247	4th, East	2008	—	L, 1–4, WBS	—	—	—
2008–09	80	49	23	—	2	6	106	.663	296	240	1st, East	2009	—	W, 4–0, PHI	W, 4–3, WBS	W, 4–1, PRO	W, 4–2, MTB
2009–10	80	60	17	—	0	3	123	.769	342	218	1st, East	2010	—	W, 4–1, BRI	W, 4–0, ALB	W, 4–2, MAN	W, 4–2, TEX
2010–11	80	46	26	—	3	5	100	.625	255	214	2nd, East	2011	—	L, 2–4, CHA	—	—	—
2011–12	76	38	26	—	4	8	88	.579	244	225	3rd, East	2012	—	L, 2–3, WBS	—	—	—
2012–13	76	36	31	—	3	6	81	.533	204	196	4th, East	2013	—	L, 2–3, PRO	—	—	—
2013–14	76	39	27	—	5	5	88	.579	221	213	4th, East	2014	—	Did not qualify			
2014–15	76	46	22	—	5	3	100	.658	218	181	1st, East	2015	—	W, 3–1, WOR	L, 2–4, HFD	—	—
2015–16	76	43	21	—	5	7	98	.645	259	220	1st, Atlantic	2016	—	W, 3–2, POR	W, 4–3, WBS	W, 4–1, TOR	L, 0–4, LE
2016–17	76	43	22	—	8	3	97	.638	252	211	3rd, Atlantic	2017	—	W, 3–2, LV	L, 3–4, PRO	—	—
2017–18	76	30	37	—	4	5	69	.454	201	249	8th, Atlantic	2018	—	Did not qualify			
2018–19	76	43	25	—	4	4	94	.618	211	215	3rd, Atlantic	2019	—	W, 3–2, BRI	L, 0–4, CHA	—	—
2019–20	62	37	18	—	3	4	81	.653	187	157	2nd, Atlantic	2020	Season cancelled due to the COVID-19 pandemic				
2020–21	33	24	7	—	2	0	50	.758	110	77	1st, North	2021	No playoffs were held				
2021–22	76	34	32	—	6	4	78	.513	202	209	5th, Atlantic	2022	L, 1–2, WBS	—	—	—	—
2022–23	72	44	19	—	5	4	97	.674	217	184	2nd, Atlantic	2023	BYE	W, 3–1, CHA	W, 3–0, HAR	W, 4–2, ROC	W, 4–3, CV
2023–24	72	53	14	—	0	5	111	.771	229	151	1st, Atlantic	2024	BYE	W, 3–1 LV	W, 3–0, HAR	W, 4–3, CLE	W, 4-2, CV
2024–25	72	44	20	—	7	1	96	.667	234	211	1st, Atlantic	2025	BYE	W, 3–2, LV	L, 0–3, CHA	—	—
2025–26	72	32	31	—	6	3	73	.507	210	230	5th, Atlantic	2026	BYE	L, 1–3, WBS	—	—	—

== Team records ==
=== Single season ===
Goals: 60 Alexandre Giroux (2008–09)
Assists: 89 George "Red" Sullivan (1953–54)
Points: 124 Tim Tookey (1986–87)
Penalty minutes: 432 Steve Martinson (1985–86)
GAA: 1.98 Alfie Moore (1938–39)
SV%:

=== Career ===
Career goals: 260 Dunc Fisher
Career assists: 636 Mike Nykoluk
Career points: 808 Mike Nykoluk
Career penalty minutes: 1519 Mike Stothers
Career goaltending wins: 226 Gordie Henry
Career shutouts: 29 Nick Damore
Career games: 972 Mike Nykoluk
Career games coached: 1,256 (610–512–134) Frank Mathers

=== Team season records ===
Division championships: 20
Regular season points championships: 9
Most points-one season: 123 2009–10
Fewest points-one season: 44 1955–56
Most wins-one season: 60 2009–10
Fewest wins-one season: 19 1955–56
Most losses-one season: 44 1977–78
Fewest losses-one season: 13 1942–43
Most ties-one season (No OT): 16 1969–70
Most ties-one season (With OT): 12 1990–91, 1992–93
Fewest ties-one season (No OT): 5 1948–49
Fewest ties-one season (With OT): 1 1952–53
Fewest ties at home-season: 0 1982–83
Shootout wins-one season: 7 (7–2 overall) 2004–05
