= List of AHL seasons =

The American Hockey League is a minor professional ice hockey league in the United States and Canada. It serves as the top developmental league for the National Hockey League. The league played its first season in 1936 as the International-American Hockey League, a "circuit of mutual convenience" formed when the Northeast-based Canadian-American Hockey League and the Midwest-based International Hockey League agreed to play an interlocking schedule. After two seasons, the leagues formally merged into a unified league under the IAHL name. After the 1939–40 season, the league became known as the American Hockey League.

The 1938–39 season—the IAHL's first as a fully merged league—saw the two-time defending Eastern Amateur Hockey League champion Hershey Bears added as an eighth member club to replace the Buffalo Bisons that had been forced to fold 11 games into the 1936–37 season when the roof of its arena collapsed in a snowstorm. The Bears remain the oldest continuously operating hockey team in any league in North America outside of the NHL. The Rochester Americans, who joined as an expansion team for the 1956–57 season, are the second oldest.

== Seasons ==
- Franchises in their current form are in boldface, i.e. **Hershey Bears**.

Seasons		Teams	
Regular season	Calder Cup playoffs	Number of teams	Changes
1936–37		East Division: 4 West Division: 4	The Buffalo Bisons ceased operations after 11 games, reducing the West Division to 3 teams.
1937–38		East Division: 4 West Division: 3	The Cleveland Falcons became the Cleveland Barons.
1938–39		East Division: 4 West Division: 4	The **Hershey Bears** transferred from the Eastern Amateur Hockey League.
1939–40		East Division: 4 West Division: 5	The Indianapolis Capitals joined as an expansion team.
1940–41		East Division: 4 West Division: 5	The Syracuse Stars became the Buffalo Bisons.
1941–42		East Division: 5 West Division: 5	The Philadelphia Ramblers became the Philadelphia Rockets. The Washington Lions joined as an expansion team.
1942–43		East Division: 4 West Division: 4	The Philadelphia Rockets ceased operations. The Springfield Indians ceased operations. The New Haven Eagles ceased operations after 32 games.
1943–44		East Division: 3 West Division: 3	The Washington Lions ceased operations.
1944–45		East Division: 3 West Division: 4	The St. Louis Flyers transferred from the American Hockey Association.
1945–46		East Division: 4 West Division: 4	The New Haven Eagles resumed operations.
1946–47		East Division: 5 West Division: 5	The New Haven Eagles became the New Haven Ramblers. The Springfield Indians resumed operations. A new Philadelphia Rockets joined as an expansion team.
1947–48		East Division: 6 West Division: 5	The Washington Lions resumed operations.
1948–49		East Division: 6 West Division: 5	
1949–50		East Division: 5 West Division: 5	The Philadelphia Rockets ceased operations. The Washington Lions became the Cincinnati Mohawks.
1950–51		East Division: 5 West Division: 5	The New Haven Ramblers became the New Haven Eagles and ceased operations after 28 games.
1951–52		East Division: 4 West Division: 5	The Springfield Indians became the Syracuse Warriors.
1952–53		7 (no divisions)	The Indianapolis Capitals ceased operations. The Cincinnati Mohawks transferred to the International Hockey League.
1953–54		6 (no divisions)	The St. Louis Flyers ceased operations.
1954–55		6 (no divisions)	The Syracuse Warriors became the Springfield Indians.
1955–56		6 (no divisions)	
1956–57		6 (no divisions)	The Pittsburgh Hornets ceased operations. The **Rochester Americans** joined as an expansion team.
1957–58		6 (no divisions)	
1958–59		6 (no divisions)	
1959–60		7 (no divisions)	The Quebec Aces transferred from the Quebec Hockey League
1960–61		7 (no divisions)	
1961–62		East Division: 4 West Division: 4	The Pittsburgh Hornets resumed operations.
1962–63		East Division: 5 West Division: 4	The Baltimore Clippers joined as an expansion team.
1963–64		East Division: 5 West Division: 4	
1964–65		East Division: 5 West Division: 4	
1965–66		East Division: 5 West Division: 4	
1966–67		East Division: 5 West Division: 4	
1967–68		East Division: 4 West Division: 4	The Pittsburgh Hornets ceased operations. The Springfield Indians became the Springfield Kings.
1968–69		East Division: 4 West Division: 4	
1969–70	1970	East Division: 4 West Division: 5	The Montreal Voyageurs joined as an expansion team.
1970–71	1971	East Division: 4 West Division: 4	The Buffalo Bisons ceased operations.
1971–72	1972	East Division: 5 West Division: 6	The Quebec Aces became the Richmond Robins. The Montreal Voyageurs became the Nova Scotia Voyageurs. The Boston Braves joined as an expansion team. The Cincinnati Swords join as an expansion team. The Tidewater Wings joined as an expansion team.
1972–73	1973	East Division: 6 West Division: 6	The New Haven Nighthawks joined as an expansion team. The Cleveland Barons became the Jacksonville Barons midseason. The Tidewater Wings became the Virginia Wings.
1973–74	1974	North Division: 6 South Division: 6	
1974–75	1975	North Division: 5 South Division: 5	The Boston Braves ceased operations. The Jacksonville Barons ceased operations. The Cincinnati Swords ceased operations. The Syracuse Eagles joined as an expansion team after purchasing the Jacksonville franchise. The Springfield Kings became the Springfield Indians.
1975–76	1976	North Division: 4 South Division: 4	The Syracuse Eagles ceased operations. The Virginia Wings ceased operations.
1976–77	1977	6 (no divisions)	The Richmond Robins ceased operations. The Baltimore Clippers transferred to the Southern Hockey League. The Providence Reds became the Rhode Island Reds.
1977–78	1978	North Division: 4 South Division: 5	The Maine Mariners joined as an expansion team. The Rhode Island Reds become the Binghamton Dusters. The Philadelphia Firebirds transferred from the North American Hockey League. The Hampton Gulls transferred from the Southern Hockey League.
1978–79	1979	North Division: 4 South Division: 5	The Hampton Gulls ceased operations. The New Brunswick Hawks joined as an expansion team.
1979–80	1980	North Division: 5 South Division: 5	The Adirondack Red Wings joined as an expansion team. The Philadelphia Firebirds became the Syracuse Firebirds.
1980–81	1981	North Division: 4 South Division: 5	The Syracuse Firebirds ceased operations. The Binghamton Dusters became the Binghamton Whalers.
1981–82	1982	North Division: 5 South Division: 6	The Fredericton Express joined as an expansion team. The Erie Blades transferred from the Eastern Hockey League.
1982–83	1983	North Division: 6 South Division: 7	The New Brunswick Hawks became the St. Catharines Saints. The Sherbrooke Jets joined as an expansion team. The Moncton Alpines joined as an expansion team. The Erie Blades merge with the Baltimore Skipjacks, who transferred from the Atlantic Coast Hockey League.
1983–84	1984	North Division: 6 South Division: 7	
1984–85	1985	North Division: 6 South Division: 7	The Sherbrooke Jets ceased operations. The Nova Scotia Voyageurs became the Sherbrooke Canadiens. The Nova Scotia Oilers joined as an expansion team. The Moncton Alpines became the Moncton Golden Flames.
1985–86	1986	North Division: 6 South Division: 7	
1986–87	1987	North Division: 6 South Division: 7	The St. Catharines Saints became the Newmarket Saints.
1987–88	1988	North Division: 7 South Division: 7	The original Maine Mariners become the Utica Devils. A new Maine Mariners joined as an expansion team. The dormant Boston Braves became the Moncton Hawks. The Moncton Golden Flames ceased operations.
1988–89	1989	North Division: 7 South Division: 7	The Nova Scotia Oilers became the Cape Breton Oilers. The Fredericton Express became the Halifax Citadels.
1989–90	1990	North Division: 7 South Division: 7	
1990–91	1991	North Division: 7 South Division: 8	The Binghamton Whalers became the Binghamton Rangers. The Sherbrooke Canadiens move became the Fredericton Canadiens. The Capital District Islanders joined as an expansion team.
1991–92	1992	Atlantic Division: 5 North Division: 5 South Division: 5	The Newmarket Saints became the St. John's Maple Leafs.
1992–93	1993	Atlantic Division: 5 North Division: 5 South Division: 6	The New Haven Nighthawks became the New Haven Senators. The Maine Mariners became the **Providence Bruins**. The Hamilton Canucks joined as an expansion team.
1993–94	1994	Atlantic Division: 6 North Division: 5 South Division: 5	The Utica Devils became the Saint John Flames. The Baltimore Skipjacks became the Portland Pirates. The Halifax Citadels became the Cornwall Aces. The Capital District Islanders became the Albany River Rats. The New Haven Senators became the Prince Edward Island Senators.
1994–95	1995	Atlantic Division: 5 North Division: 6 South Division: 5	The Moncton Hawks ceased operations. The Hamilton Canucks became the **Syracuse Crunch**. The Springfield Indians became the Worcester IceCats. The Springfield Falcons joined as an expansion team.
1995–96	1996	**Northern Conference**; Atlantic Division: 5 North Division: 4; **Southern Conference**; Central Division: 5 South Division: 4	The Baltimore Bandits joined as an expansion team. The Carolina Monarchs joined as an expansion team.
1996–97	1997	**Northern Conference**; Canadian Division: 4 Empire State Division: 5; **Southern Conference**; New England Division: 4 Mid-Atlantic Division: 5	The Prince Edward Island Senators suspended operations. The Cornwall Aces suspended operations. The Cape Breton Oilers became the Hamilton Bulldogs. The Kentucky Thoroughblades joined as an expansion team. The Philadelphia Phantoms joined as an expansion team.
1997–98	1998	**Eastern Conference**; Atlantic Division: 4 New England Division: 5; **Western Conference**; Empire State Division: 5 Mid-Atlantic Division: 4	The Binghamton Rangers became the Hartford Wolf Pack. The Carolina Monarchs move became the Beast of New Haven. The Baltimore Bandits became the Cincinnati Mighty Ducks.
1998–99	1999	**Eastern Conference**; Atlantic Division: 5 New England Division: 5; **Western Conference**; Empire State Division: 5 Mid-Atlantic Division: 4	The Lowell Lock Monsters joined as an expansion team.
1999–00	2000	**Eastern Conference**; Atlantic Division: 4 New England Division: 5; **Western Conference**; Empire State Division: 5 Mid-Atlantic Division: 5	The Adirondack Red Wings ceased operations. The Beast of New Haven ceased operations. The Fredericton Canadiens became the Quebec Citadelles. The Louisville Panthers joined as an expansion team. The Cornwall Aces resumed operations and became the **Wilkes-Barre/Scranton Penguins**.
2000–01	2001	**Eastern Conference**; Canadian Division: 4 New England Division: 6; **Western Conference**; Mid-Atlantic Division: 6 South Division: 4	The Norfolk Admirals joined as an expansion team.
2001–02	2002	**Eastern Conference**; Canadian Division: 5 North Division: 5 East Division: 4; **Western Conference**; Central Division: 4 West Division: 5 South Division: 4	The Louisville Panthers suspended operations. The Kentucky Thoroughblades became the Cleveland Barons. The Bridgeport Sound Tigers joined as an expansion team. The Manchester Monarchs joined as an expansion team. The **Chicago Wolves** transferred from the International Hockey League. The **Grand Rapids Griffins** transferred from the IHL. The Houston Aeros transferred from the IHL. The Manitoba Moose transferred from the IHL. The **Milwaukee Admirals** transferred from the IHL. The Utah Grizzlies transferred from the IHL.
2002–03	2003	**Eastern Conference**; Canadian Division: 4 North Division: 5 East Division: 4; **Western Conference**; Central Division: 5 West Division: 5 South Division: 4	The Quebec Citadelles merge into the Hamilton Bulldogs. The Prince Edward Island Senators resumed operations as the Binghamton Senators. The dormant Adirondack Red Wings was purchased and relocated as the San Antonio Rampage.
2003–04	2004	**Eastern Conference**; Atlantic Division: 7 East Division: 7; **Western Conference**; North Division: 7 West Division: 7	The Saint John Flames suspended operations. The Toronto Roadrunners split from the Hamilton Bulldogs.
2004–05	2005	**Eastern Conference**; Atlantic Division: 7 East Division: 7; **Western Conference**; North Division: 7 West Division: 7	The Toronto Roadrunners became the Edmonton Road Runners.
2005–06	2006	**Eastern Conference**; Atlantic Division: 7 East Division: 6; **Western Conference**; North Division: 7 West Division: 7	The Cincinnati Mighty Ducks suspended operations. The Edmonton Road Runners suspended operations. The Utah Grizzlies suspended operations. The Saint John Flames resumed operations as the Omaha Ak-Sar-Ben Knights. The Louisville Panthers resumed operations as the Iowa Stars. The St. John's Maple Leafs became the **Toronto Marlies**. The Worcester IceCats became the Peoria Rivermen.
2006–07	2007	**Eastern Conference**; Atlantic Division: 7 East Division: 7; **Western Conference**; North Division: 6 West Division: 7	The Lowell Lock Monsters became the Lowell Devils. The Cleveland Barons became the Worcester Sharks.
2007–08	2008	**Eastern Conference**; Atlantic Division: 7 East Division: 7; **Western Conference**; North Division: 7 West Division: 8	The Utah Grizzlies resumed operations as the Lake Erie Monsters. The Cincinnati Mighty Ducks resumed operations as the **Rockford IceHogs**. The Omaha Ak-Sar-Ben Knights became the Quad City Flames.
2008–09	2009	**Eastern Conference**; Atlantic Division: 7 East Division: 7; **Western Conference**; North Division: 7 West Division: 8	The Iowa Stars became the Iowa Chops.
2009–10	2010	**Eastern Conference**; Atlantic Division: 8 East Division: 7; **Western Conference**; North Division: 7 West Division: 7	The Quad City Flames became the Abbotsford Heat. The Philadelphia Phantoms became the Adirondack Phantoms. The **Texas Stars** joined as a temporary expansion team. The Iowa Chops were involuntarily suspended.
2010–11	2011	**Eastern Conference**; Atlantic Division: 7 East Division: 8; **Western Conference**; North Division: 7 West Division: 8	The Albany River Rats became the **Charlotte Checkers**. The Lowell Devils become the Albany Devils. The Edmonton Road Runners resumed operations as the Oklahoma City Barons. The Texas Stars purchased the Iowa Chops franchise. The Hartford Wolf Pack became the Connecticut Whale (effective November 27, 2010).
2011–12	2012	**Eastern Conference**; Atlantic Division: 5 Northeast Division: 5 East Division: 5; **Western Conference**; North Division: 5 Midwest Division: 5 West Division: 5	The Manitoba Moose became the St. John's IceCaps.
2012–13	2013	**Eastern Conference**; Atlantic Division: 5 Northeast Division: 5 East Division: 5; **Western Conference**; North Division: 5 Midwest Division: 5 South Division: 5	
2013–14	2014	**Eastern Conference**; Atlantic Division: 5 Northeast Division: 5 East Division: 5; **Western Conference**; North Division: 5 Midwest Division: 5 West Division: 5	The Connecticut Whale became the **Hartford Wolf Pack**. The Houston Aeros became the **Iowa Wild**. The Peoria Rivermen became the Utica Comets.
2014–15	2015	**Eastern Conference**; Atlantic Division: 5 Northeast Division: 5 East Division: 5; **Western Conference**; North Division: 5 Midwest Division: 5 West Division: 5	The Abbotsford Heat became the Adirondack Flames. The Adirondack Phantoms became the **Lehigh Valley Phantoms**.
2015–16	2016	**Eastern Conference**; Atlantic Division: 8 North Division: 7; **Western Conference**; Central Division: 8 Pacific Division: 7	The Adirondack Flames became the **Stockton Heat**. The Hamilton Bulldogs became the St. John's IceCaps. The Manchester Monarchs became the **Ontario Reign**. The Norfolk Admirals became the **San Diego Gulls**. The Oklahoma City Barons became the **Bakersfield Condors**. The St. John's IceCaps became the **Manitoba Moose**. The Worcester Sharks became the **San Jose Barracuda**.
2016–17	2017	**Eastern Conference**; Atlantic Division: 7 North Division: 7; **Western Conference**; Central Division: 8 Pacific Division: 8	The Lake Erie Monsters became the **Cleveland Monsters**; The Portland Pirates became the **Springfield Thunderbirds**. The Springfield Falcons became the **Tucson Roadrunners**.
2017–18	2018	**Eastern Conference**; Atlantic Division: 8 North Division: 7; **Western Conference**; Central Division: 7 Pacific Division: 8	The Albany Devils became the Binghamton Devils; The Binghamton Senators became the **Belleville Senators**. The St. John's IceCaps became the **Laval Rocket**.
2018–19	2019	**Eastern Conference**; Atlantic Division: 8 North Division: 8; **Western Conference**; Central Division: 8 Pacific Division: 7	The **Colorado Eagles** joined as an expansion team.
2019–20	Not held	**Eastern Conference**; Atlantic Division: 8 North Division: 8; **Western Conference**; Central Division: 8 Pacific Division: 7	Season ended prematurely due to COVID-19 pandemic.
2020–21	Not held	Atlantic Division: 3 Canadian Division: 5 North Division: 7 Central Division: 6 Pacific Division: 7	The San Antonio Rampage became the **Henderson Silver Knights** Several temporary actions were taken in response to the ongoing COVID-19 pandemic: • The season start was delayed until February 5, 2021. • The Charlotte Checkers, Milwaukee Admirals, and Springfield Thunderbirds went on hiatus. • The Belleville Senators, Binghamton Devils, Laval Rocket, Ontario Reign, Providence Bruins, San Diego Gulls, and Stockton Heat relocated to venues closer to their NHL affiliates. • Teams playing in Canada were placed in their own division to avoid cross-border travel.
2021–22	2022	**Eastern Conference**; Atlantic Division: 8 North Division: 7; **Western Conference**; Central Division: 7 Pacific Division: 9	The Binghamton Devils became the **Utica Comets**; The Bridgeport Sound Tigers became the **Bridgeport Islanders**. The Utica Comets became the **Abbotsford Canucks**.
2022–23	2023	**Eastern Conference**; Atlantic Division: 8 North Division: 7; **Western Conference**; Central Division: 7 Pacific Division: 10	The Stockton Heat became the **Calgary Wranglers**; The **Coachella Valley Firebirds** joined as an expansion team.
2023–24	2024	**Eastern Conference**; Atlantic Division: 8 North Division: 7; **Western Conference**; Central Division: 7 Pacific Division: 10	For the first time since the 1994–95 season, the league featured an unaffiliated team, with the Chicago Wolves having ended their affiliation with the Carolina Hurricanes.
2024–25	2025	**Eastern Conference**; Atlantic Division: 8 North Division: 7; **Western Conference**; Central Division: 7 Pacific Division: 10	
