= 1973 Calder Cup playoffs =

North American ice hockey tournament

Tournament details
- Dates: April 3 – May 15, 1973
- Teams: 8

Final positions
- Champions: Cincinnati Swords
- Runner-up: Nova Scotia Voyageurs

The 1973 Calder Cup playoffs of the American Hockey League began on April 3, 1973. The eight teams that qualified played best-of-seven series for Division Semifinals and Finals. The division champions played a best-of-seven series for the Calder Cup. The Calder Cup Final ended on May 15, 1973, with the Cincinnati Swords defeating the Nova Scotia Voyageurs four games to one to win the only Calder Cup in team history.

== Playoff seeds ==
After the 1972–73 AHL regular season, the top three teams from each division qualified for the playoffs. The Cincinnati Swords finished the regular season with the best overall record.

=== Eastern Division ===
1. Nova Scotia Voyageurs - 101 points
2. Boston Braves - 81 points
3. Rochester Americans - 78 points
4. Providence Reds - 78 points

=== Western Division ===
1. Cincinnati Swords - 113 points
2. Hershey Bears - 95 points
3. Virginia Wings - 92 points
4. Richmond Robins - 70 points

== Bracket ==
Division Semifinals
1 | Nova Scotia | 4
4 | Providence | 0
Eastern Division
2 | Boston | 4
3 | Rochester | 2
1 | Cincinnati | 4
4 | Richmond | 0
Western Division
2 | Hershey | 3
3 | Virginia | 4

Division Finals
1 | Nova Scotia | 4
2 | Boston | 0
1 | Cincinnati | 4
3 | Virginia | 2

Calder Cup Final
E1 | Nova Scotia | 1
W1 | Cincinnati | 4

In each round, the team that earned more points during the regular season receives home ice advantage, meaning they receive the "extra" game on home-ice if the series reaches the maximum number of games. There is no set series format due to arena scheduling conflicts and travel considerations.

== Division Semifinals ==
Note: Home team is listed first.

=== Eastern Division ===
==== (1) Nova Scotia Voyageurs vs. (4) Providence Reds ====
| April 3 | Nova Scotia Voyageurs | 7 - 2 | Providence Reds |

| April 6 | Nova Scotia Voyageurs | 5 - 1 | Providence Reds |

| April 8 | Providence Reds | 4 - 6 | Nova Scotia Voyageurs |

| April 10 | Providence Reds | 3 - 4 | OT | Nova Scotia Voyageurs |

| Nova Scotia won series 4 – 0 |

==== (2) Boston Braves vs. (3) Rochester Americans ====
| April 3 | Boston Braves | 3 - 2 | OT | Rochester Americans |

| April 7 | Boston Braves | 6 - 4 | Rochester Americans |

| April 8 | Rochester Americans | 5 - 4 | Boston Braves |

| April 11 | Rochester Americans | 5 - 3 | Boston Braves |

| April 13 | Boston Braves | 5 - 4 | Rochester Americans |

| April 15 | Rochester Americans | 4 - 6 | Boston Braves |

| Boston won series 4 - 2 |

=== Western Division ===
==== (1) Cincinnati Swords vs. (4) Richmond Robins ====
| April 4 | Cincinnati Swords | 5 - 1 | Richmond Robins |

| April 6 | Cincinnati Swords | 8 - 3 | Richmond Robins |

| April 8 | Richmond Robins | 4 - 7 | Cincinnati Swords |

| April 10 | Richmond Robins | 4 - 5 | OT | Cincinnati Swords |

| Cincinnati won series 4 - 0 |

==== (2) Hershey Bears vs. (3) Virginia Wings ====
| April 6 | Virginia Wings | 2 - 3 | Hershey Bears |

| April 8 | Virginia Wings | 3 - 2 | Hershey Bears |

| April 10 | Hershey Bears | 5 - 4 | OT | Virginia Wings |

| April 12 | Hershey Bears | 7 - 4 | Virginia Wings |

| April 14 | Hershey Bears | 4 - 5 | Virginia Wings |

| April 15 | Virginia Wings | 7 - 0 | Hershey Bears |

| April 17 | Hershey Bears | 3 - 5 | Virginia Wings |

| Virginia won series 4 - 3 |

== Division Finals ==
=== Eastern Division ===
==== (1) Nova Scotia Voyageurs vs. (2) Boston Braves ====
| April 18 | Nova Scotia Voyageurs | 8 - 1 | Boston Braves |

| April 20 | Nova Scotia Voyageurs | 8 - 2 | Boston Braves |

| April 22 | Boston Braves | 1 - 4 | Nova Scotia Voyageurs |

| April 24 | Boston Braves | 1 - 7 | Nova Scotia Voyageurs |

| Nova Scotia won series 4 - 0 |

=== Western Division ===
==== (1) Cincinnati Swords vs. (3) Virginia Wings ====
| April 19 | Cincinnati Swords | 2 - 3 | Virginia Wings |

| April 22 | Cincinnati Swords | 6 - 2 | Virginia Wings |

| April 24 | Virginia Wings | 2 - 4 | Cincinnati Swords |

| April 26 | Virginia Wings | 2 - 0 | Cincinnati Swords |

| May 1 | Cincinnati Swords | 4 - 3 | Virginia Wings |

| May 2 | Virginia Wings | 1 - 5 | Cincinnati Swords |

| Cincinnati won series 4 - 2 |

== Calder Cup Final ==
=== (W1) Cincinnati Swords vs. (E1) Nova Scotia Voyageurs ===
| May 4 | Cincinnati Swords | 7 - 3 | Nova Scotia Voyageurs |

| May 6 | Cincinnati Swords | 7 - 6 | Nova Scotia Voyageurs |

| May 9 | Nova Scotia Voyageurs | 0 - 3 | Cincinnati Swords |

| May 11 | Nova Scotia Voyageurs | 5 - 2 | Cincinnati Swords |

| May 15 | Cincinnati Swords | 5 - 1 | Nova Scotia Voyageurs |

| Cincinnati won series 4 - 1 |

== See also ==
- 1972–73 AHL season
- List of AHL seasons

| Preceded by 1972 Calder Cup Playoffs | Calder Cup playoffs 1973 | Succeeded by 1974 Calder Cup Playoffs |
