= 1974 Calder Cup playoffs =

North American ice hockey tournament

Tournament details
- Dates: April 3 – May 8, 1974
- Teams: 8

Final positions
- Champions: Hershey Bears
- Runner-up: Providence Reds

The 1974 Calder Cup playoffs of the American Hockey League began on April 3, 1974. The eight teams that qualified played best-of-seven series for Division Semifinals and Finals. The division champions played a best-of-seven series for the Calder Cup. The Calder Cup Final ended on May 8, 1974, with the Hershey Bears defeating the Providence Reds four games to one to win the Calder Cup for the fifth time in team history.

Richmond and Baltimore tied the AHL playoff record for highest scoring shutout in game 2 of their Southern division semifinal, which Richmond won 10-0.

== Playoff seeds ==
After the 1973–74 AHL regular season, the top three teams from each division qualified for the playoffs. The Rochester Americans finished the regular season with the best overall record.

=== Northern Division ===
1. Rochester Americans - 97 points
2. Providence Reds - 88 points
3. Nova Scotia Voyageurs - 86 points
4. New Haven Nighthawks - 80 points

=== Southern Division ===
1. Baltimore Clippers - 94 points
2. Hershey Bears - 92 points
3. Cincinnati Swords - 91 points
4. Richmond Robins - 58 points

== Bracket ==
Division Semifinals
1	Rochester	2
4	New Haven	4
Northern Division
2	Providence	4
3	Nova Scotia	2
1	Baltimore	4
4	Richmond	1
Southern Division
2	Hershey	4
3	Cincinnati	1

Division Finals
4	New Haven	0
2	Providence	4
1	Baltimore	0
2	Hershey	4

Calder Cup Final
N2	Providence	1
S2	Hershey	4

In each round, the team that earned more points during the regular season receives home ice advantage, meaning they receive the "extra" game on home-ice if the series reaches the maximum number of games. There is no set series format due to arena scheduling conflicts and travel considerations.

== Division Semifinals ==
Note: Home team is listed first.

=== Northern Division ===
==== (1) Rochester Americans vs. (4) New Haven Nighthawks ====
April 3	Rochester Americans	4 - 3	OT	New Haven Nighthawks

April 5	Rochester Americans	2 - 1	New Haven Nighthawks

April 10	New Haven Nighthawks	5 - 2	Rochester Americans

April 13	New Haven Nighthawks	5 - 4	Rochester Americans

April 14	Rochester Americans	1 - 5	New Haven Nighthawks

April 16	New Haven Nighthawks	6 - 3	Rochester Americans

New Haven won series 4 – 2

==== (2) Providence Reds vs. (3) Nova Scotia Voyageurs ====
April 5	Providence Reds	6 - 4	Nova Scotia Voyageurs

April 7	Providence Reds	4 - 1	Nova Scotia Voyageurs

April 9	Nova Scotia Voyageurs	1 - 4	Providence Reds

April 12	Nova Scotia Voyageurs	7 - 6	OT	Providence Reds

April 15	Nova Scotia Voyageurs	4 - 1	Providence Reds

April 17	Nova Scotia Voyageurs	0 - 8	Providence Reds

Providence won series 4 - 2

=== Southern Division ===
==== (1) Baltimore Clippers vs. (4) Richmond Robins ====
April 5	Baltimore Clippers	5 - 2	Richmond Robins

April 6	Richmond Robins	10 - 0	Baltimore Clippers

April 9	Baltimore Clippers	4 - 2	Richmond Robins

April 10	Richmond Robins	5 - 6	OT	Baltimore Clippers

April 12	Baltimore Clippers	7 - 6	OT	Richmond Robins

Baltimore won series 4 - 1

==== (2) Hershey Bears vs. (3) Cincinnati Swords ====
April 3	Cincinnati Swords	5 - 6	OT	Hershey Bears

April 5	Cincinnati Swords	6 - 2	Hershey Bears

April 9	Hershey Bears	1 - 0	Cincinnati Swords

April 11	Hershey Bears	4 - 2	Cincinnati Swords

April 13	Hershey Bears	4 - 2	Cincinnati Swords

Hershey won series 4 - 1

== Division Finals ==
=== Northern Division ===
==== (2) Providence Reds vs. (4) New Haven Nighthawks ====
April 19	Providence Reds	3 - 2	OT	New Haven Nighthawks

April 20	New Haven Nighthawks	4 - 5	Providence Reds

April 21	Providence Reds	6 - 4	New Haven Nighthawks

April 23	New Haven Nighthawks	3 - 4	OT	Providence Reds

Providence won series 4 - 0

=== Southern Division ===
==== (1) Baltimore Clippers vs. (2) Hershey Bears ====
April 16	Baltimore Clippers	1 - 3	Hershey Bears

April 17	Hershey Bears	4 - 2	Baltimore Clippers

April 19	Baltimore Clippers	1 - 4	Hershey Bears

April 20	Hershey Bears	4 - 3	OT	Baltimore Clippers

Hershey won series 4 - 0

== Calder Cup Final ==
=== (S2) Hershey Bears vs. (N2) Providence Reds ===
April 27	Hershey Bears	4 - 3	OT	Providence Reds

May 1	Hershey Bears	3 - 2	Providence Reds

May 3	Providence Reds	3 - 4	OT	Hershey Bears

May 5	Providence Reds	5 - 4	OT	Hershey Bears

May 8	Hershey Bears	4 - 3	Providence Reds

Hershey won series 4 - 1

== See also ==
- 1973–74 AHL season
- List of AHL seasons

Preceded by 1973 Calder Cup playoffs	Calder Cup playoffs 1974	Succeeded by 1975 Calder Cup playoffs
