= 1973 in ice hockey =

The following is a chronicle of events during the year 1973 in ice hockey.

== National Hockey League ==
- Art Ross Trophy as the NHL's leading scorer during the regular season: Phil Esposito
- Hart Memorial Trophy: for the NHL's Most Valuable Player: Bobby Clarke
- Stanley Cup - The Montreal Canadiens defeated the Chicago Blackhawks in the 1973 Stanley Cup Finals
- With the first overall pick in the 1973 NHL Amateur Draft, the New York Islanders selected Denis Potvin

== World Hockey Association ==
The New England Whalers defeated the Winnipeg Jets to win the inaugural Avco World Trophy.

- Andre Lacroix won the WHA scoring championship
- Bobby Hull won the WHA Most Valuable Player Award

== Canadian Hockey League ==
- Ontario Hockey League: J. Ross Robertson Cup.
- Quebec Major Junior Hockey League: won President's Cup (QMJHL) for the first time in team history
- Western Hockey League: President's Cup (WHL) for the first time in team history
- Memorial Cup:

== Minor League hockey ==
- AHL: Calder Cup
- IHL: Turner Cup.
- Allan Cup:

== University hockey ==
NCAA Division I Men's Ice Hockey Tournament

== Season articles ==
| 1972–73 NHL season | 1973–74 NHL season |
| 1972–73 AHL season | 1973–74 AHL season |

== See also ==
- 1973 in sports
