= Ed MacQueen =

Canadian ice hockey player

- Born: December 28, 1935 (age 89); Glace Bay, Nova Scotia, Canada
- Height: 5 ft 11 in (180 cm)
- Weight: 165 lb (75 kg; 11 st 11 lb)
- Position: Defense
- Shot: Right
- Played for: Cleveland Barons; Providence Reds; Baltimore Clippers; Vancouver Canucks; Quebec Aces
- Playing career: 1952–1971

Edward James MacQueen (born December 28, 1935) was a Canadian professional defenseman who played 840 games in the American Hockey League for the Cleveland Barons, Providence Reds, and Baltimore Clippers. He also played for the Vancouver Canucks in the Western Hockey League, and for the Quebec Aces in the Quebec Hockey League.
