= Boston Braves (disambiguation) =

The Boston Braves were a Major League Baseball team, now known as the Atlanta Braves.

Boston Braves may also refer to the following teams in other sports:

- Boston Braves (NFL), the National Football League team now known as the Washington Commanders
- Boston Braves (AHL), a former American Hockey League team
- Boston Braves (rugby league), an American National Rugby League team
