= 1975 Calder Cup playoffs =

North American ice hockey tournament

Tournament details
- Dates: April 2 – May 7, 1975
- Teams: 8

Final positions
- Champions: Springfield Indians
- Runner-up: New Haven Nighthawks

The 1975 Calder Cup playoffs of the American Hockey League began on April 2, 1975. The eight teams that qualified played best-of-seven series for Division Semifinals and Finals. The division champions played a best-of-seven series for the Calder Cup. The Calder Cup Final ended on May 7, 1975, with the Springfield Indians defeating the New Haven Nighthawks four games to one to win the Calder Cup for the fourth time in team history.

== Playoff seeds ==
After the 1974–75 AHL regular season, the top three teams from each division qualified for the playoffs. The Providence Reds finished the regular season with the best overall record.

=== Northern Division ===
1. Providence Reds - 98 points
2. Rochester Americans - 93 points
3. Nova Scotia Voyageurs - 89 points
4. Springfield Indians - 78 points
5. New Haven Nighthawks - 71 points (Played in the South division part of the bracket after beating Syracuse in a one game playoff.)

=== Southern Division ===
1. Virginia Wings - 75 points
2. Richmond Robins - 65 points
3. Hershey Bears - 64 points

== Bracket ==
Division Semifinals
N1	Providence	2
N4	Springfield	4
Northern Division
N2	Rochester	4
N3	Nova Scotia	2
S1	Virginia	1
N5	New Haven	4
Southern Division
S2	Richmond	3
S3	Hershey	4

Division Finals
N4	Springfield	4
N2	Rochester	2
N5	New Haven	4
S3	Hershey	1

Calder Cup Final
N4	Springfield	4
N5	New Haven	1

In each round, the higher seed receives home ice advantage, meaning they receive the "extra" game on home-ice if the series reaches the maximum number of games. There is no set series format due to arena scheduling conflicts and travel considerations.

== Division Semifinals ==
Note: Home team is listed first.

=== Northern Division ===
==== (N1) Providence Reds vs. (N4) Springfield Indians ====
April 2	Providence Reds	5 - 4	Springfield Indians

April 3	Providence Reds	0 - 5	Springfield Indians

April 5	Springfield Indians	5 - 2	Providence Reds

April 6	Springfield Indians	5 - 0	Providence Reds

April 11	Providence Reds	4 - 3	OT	Springfield Indians

April 12	Springfield Indians	3 - 2	OT	Providence Reds

Springfield won series 4 – 2

==== (N2) Rochester Americans vs. (N3) Nova Scotia Voyageurs ====
April 2	Rochester Americans	2 - 3	Nova Scotia Voyageurs

April 6	Rochester Americans	5 - 4	OT	Nova Scotia Voyageurs

April 9	Nova Scotia Voyageurs	1 - 2	OT	Rochester Americans

April 11	Nova Scotia Voyageurs	1 - 2	Rochester Americans

April 13	Rochester Americans	3 - 6	Nova Scotia Voyageurs

April 16	Nova Scotia Voyageurs	2 - 5	Rochester Americans

Rochester won series 4 - 2

=== Southern Division ===
==== (S1) Virginia Wings vs. (N5) New Haven Nighthawks ====
April 4	Virginia Wings	4 - 8	New Haven Nighthawks

April 6	Virginia Wings	5 - 2	New Haven Nighthawks

April 8	New Haven Nighthawks	4 - 0	Virginia Wings

April 10	New Haven Nighthawks	6 - 2	Virginia Wings

April 12	Virginia Wings	2 - 3	New Haven Nighthawks

New Haven won series 4 - 1

==== (S2) Richmond Robins vs. (S3) Hershey Bears ====
April 3	Richmond Robins	5 - 3	Hershey Bears

April 5	Hershey Bears	6 - 3	Richmond Robins

April 6	Richmond Robins	2 - 5	Hershey Bears

April 9	Hershey Bears	6 - 3	Richmond Robins

April 11	Richmond Robins	5 - 4	OT	Hershey Bears

April 12	Hershey Bears	1 - 2	OT	Richmond Robins

April 16	Richmond Robins	3 - 4	Hershey Bears

Hershey won series 4 - 3

== Division Finals ==
=== Northern Division ===
==== (N2) Rochester Americans vs. (N4) Springfield Indians ====
April 18	Rochester Americans	5 - 2	Springfield Indians

April 20	Springfield Indians	5 - 4	OT	Rochester Americans

April 22	Rochester Americans	4 - 2	Springfield Indians

April 23	Springfield Indians	6 - 1	Rochester Americans

April 25	Rochester Americans	2 - 5	Springfield Indians

April 27	Springfield Indians	4 - 3	Rochester Americans

Springfield won series 4 - 2

=== Southern Division ===
==== (S3) Hershey Bears vs. (N5) New Haven Nighthawks ====
April 19	Hershey Bears	4 - 3	OT	New Haven Nighthawks

April 20	New Haven Nighthawks	4 - 0	Hershey Bears

April 22	Hershey Bears	2 - 7	New Haven Nighthawks

April 23	New Haven Nighthawks	7 - 4	Hershey Bears

April 26	Hershey Bears	3 - 6	New Haven Nighthawks

New Haven won series 4 - 1

== Calder Cup Final ==
=== (N4) Springfield Indians vs. (N5) New Haven Nighthawks ===
April 29	Springfield Indians	4 - 2	New Haven Nighthawks

May 2	New Haven Nighthawks	5 - 3	Springfield Indians

May 3	Springfield Indians	8 - 1	New Haven Nighthawks

May 6	New Haven Nighthawks	2 - 4	Springfield Indians

May 7	Springfield Indians	4 - 0	New Haven Nighthawks

Springfield won series 4 - 1

== See also ==
- 1974–75 AHL season
- List of AHL seasons

Preceded by 1974 Calder Cup playoffs	Calder Cup playoffs 1975	Succeeded by 1976 Calder Cup playoffs
