= 1972 Calder Cup playoffs =

North American ice hockey tournament

Tournament details
- Dates: April 4 – May 15, 1972
- Teams: 8

Final positions
- Champions: Nova Scotia Voyageurs
- Runner-up: Baltimore Clippers

The 1972 Calder Cup playoffs of the American Hockey League began on April 4, 1972. The eight teams that qualified played best-of-seven series for Division Semifinals and Finals. The division champions played a best-of-seven series for the Calder Cup. The Calder Cup Final ended on May 15, 1972, with the Nova Scotia Voyageurs, in their inaugural season in Nova Scotia, defeating the Baltimore Clippers four games to two to win the Calder Cup for the first time in team history. The Voyageurs also became the first Canadian team to win the Calder Cup.

Baltimore and Cincinnati set an AHL playoff record for most goals scored by both teams in one game with 18, when Baltimore beat Cincinnati 10-8 in game 5 of the Southern division final. Baltimore's Howie Menard set an AHL record for most points in one playoff game with 7 against Cleveland in game 5 of their Southern division semifinal. Two players have tied this record since then. Nova Scotia's Michel Plasse set an AHL record for lowest goals against average in one playoff, posting a 1.25 GAA.

== Playoff seeds ==
After the 1971–72 AHL regular season, the top three teams from each division qualified for the playoffs. The Boston Braves finished the regular season with the best overall record, winning the head-to-head tiebreaker with Nova Scotia.

=== Eastern Division ===
1. Boston Braves - 96 points
2. Nova Scotia Voyageurs - 96 points
3. Springfield Kings - 77 points
4. Providence Reds - 67 points

=== Western Division ===
1. Baltimore Clippers - 79 points
2. Hershey Bears - 79 points
3. Cincinnati Swords - 78 points
4. Cleveland Barons - 74 points

== Bracket ==
Division Semifinals
1	Boston	4
4	Providence	1
Eastern Division
2	Nova Scotia	4
3	Springfield	1
1	Baltimore	4
4	Cleveland	2
Western Division
2	Hershey	0
3	Cincinnati	4

Division Finals
1	Boston	0
2	Nova Scotia	4
1	Baltimore	4
3	Cincinnati	2

Calder Cup Final
E1	Nova Scotia	4
W1	Baltimore	2

In each round, the higher seed receives home ice advantage, meaning they receive the "extra" game on home-ice if the series reaches the maximum number of games. There is no set series format due to arena scheduling conflicts and travel considerations.

== Division Semifinals ==
Note: Home team is listed first.

=== Eastern Division ===
==== (1) Boston Braves vs. (4) Providence Reds ====
April 4	Boston Braves	8 - 1	Providence Reds

April 8	Boston Braves	2 - 1	Providence Reds

April 9	Providence Reds	6 - 2	Boston Braves

April 11	Providence Reds	4 - 5	OT	Boston Braves

April 15	Boston Braves	3 - 2	Providence Reds

Boston won series 4 – 1

==== (2) Nova Scotia Voyageurs vs. (3) Springfield Kings ====
April 4	Nova Scotia Voyageurs	4 - 0	Springfield Kings

April 7	Nova Scotia Voyageurs	6 - 0	Springfield Kings

April 8	Springfield Kings	3 - 2	Nova Scotia Voyageurs

April 9	Springfield Kings	2 - 5	Nova Scotia Voyageurs

April 12	Nova Scotia Voyageurs	11 - 1	Springfield Kings

Nova Scotia won series 4 - 1

=== Western Division ===
==== (1) Baltimore Clippers vs. (4) Cleveland Barons ====
April 6	Baltimore Clippers	3 - 5	Cleveland Barons

April 7	Baltimore Clippers	6 - 0	Cleveland Barons

April 8	Cleveland Barons	1 - 3	Baltimore Clippers

April 11	Cleveland Barons	5 - 3	Baltimore Clippers

April 12	Baltimore Clippers	10 - 1	Cleveland Barons

April 14	Cleveland Barons	1 - 4	Baltimore Clippers

Baltimore won series 4 - 2

==== (2) Hershey Bears vs. (3) Cincinnati Swords ====
April 5	Hershey Bears	4 - 5	OT	Cincinnati Swords

April 8	Hershey Bears	2 - 5	Cincinnati Swords

April 9	Cincinnati Swords	7 - 2	Hershey Bears

April 11	Cincinnati Swords	3 - 1	Hershey Bears

Cincinnati won series 4 - 0

== Division Finals ==
=== Eastern Division ===
==== (1) Boston Braves vs. (2) Nova Scotia Voyageurs ====
April 17	Boston Braves	1 - 4	Nova Scotia Voyageurs

April 22	Boston Braves	0 - 2	Nova Scotia Voyageurs

April 24	Nova Scotia Voyageurs	4 - 2	Boston Braves

April 26	Nova Scotia Voyageurs	5 - 2	Boston Braves

Nova Scotia won series 4 - 0

=== Western Division ===
==== (1) Baltimore Clippers vs. (3) Cincinnati Swords ====
April 18	Baltimore Clippers	7 - 4	Cincinnati Swords

April 19	Baltimore Clippers	4 - 3	Cincinnati Swords

April 21	Cincinnati Swords	3 - 2	OT	Baltimore Clippers

April 23	Cincinnati Swords	4 - 1	Baltimore Clippers

April 28	Baltimore Clippers	10 - 8	Cincinnati Swords

April 29	Cincinnati Swords	1 - 3	Baltimore Clippers

Baltimore won series 4 - 2

== Calder Cup Final ==
=== (W1) Baltimore Clippers vs. (E2) Nova Scotia Voyageurs ===
May 3	Baltimore Clippers	2 - 0	Nova Scotia Voyageurs

May 5	Baltimore Clippers	2 - 1	OT	Nova Scotia Voyageurs

May 6	Nova Scotia Voyageurs	6 - 1	Baltimore Clippers

May 8	Nova Scotia Voyageurs	6 - 1	Baltimore Clippers

May 11	Baltimore Clippers	1 - 4	Nova Scotia Voyageurs

May 15	Nova Scotia Voyageurs	4 - 1	Baltimore Clippers

Nova Scotia won series 4 - 2

== See also ==
- 1971–72 AHL season
- List of AHL seasons

Preceded by 1971 Calder Cup playoffs	Calder Cup playoffs 1972	Succeeded by 1973 Calder Cup playoffs
