= 1974–75 AHL season =

- League: American Hockey League
- Sport: Ice hockey

Regular season
- F. G. "Teddy" Oke Trophy: Providence Reds
- Season MVP: Doug Gibson
- Top scorer: Doug Gibson

Playoffs
- Champions: Springfield Indians
- Runners-up: New Haven Nighthawks

AHL seasons
- 1973–74 1975–76

The 1974–75 AHL season was the 39th season of the American Hockey League. Ten teams were scheduled to play 76 games each in the schedule. The Baltimore Clippers suspended operations after 46 games, when displaced by the Baltimore Blades of the World Hockey Association. The Providence Reds finished first overall in the regular season. The Springfield Indians won their fourth Calder Cup championship.

== Team changes ==
- The Boston Braves cease operations.
- The Jacksonville Barons cease operations. The franchise license is sold to an ownership group in Syracuse, New York.
- The Cincinnati Swords cease operations, replaced by the Cincinnati Stingers of the World Hockey Association.
- The Syracuse Eagles join the AHL as an expansion team, based in Syracuse, New York, playing in the South Division.
- The Springfield Kings revert to their previous name, the Springfield Indians.

== Final standings ==
Note: GP = Games played; W = Wins; L = Losses; T = Ties; GF = Goals for; GA = Goals against; Pts = Points;

North	GP	W	L	T	Pts	GF	GA
Providence Reds (NYR)	76	43	21	12	98	317	263
Rochester Americans (BOS)	76	42	25	9	93	317	243
Nova Scotia Voyageurs (MTL)	75	40	26	9	89	270	227
Springfield Indians (CGS/LAK)	75	33	30	12	78	299	256
New Haven Nighthawks (MNS)	76	30	35	11	71	282	302

South	GP	W	L	T	Pts	GF	GA
Virginia Wings (DET)	75	31	31	13	75	254	250
Richmond Robins (PHI/WSH)	75	29	39	7	65	261	293
Hershey Bears (BUF/PIT)	75	27	38	10	64	259	303
Syracuse Eagles (MTL/STL)	75	21	43	11	53	254	332
Baltimore Clippers^{†} (KCS)	46	14	22	10	38	136	180

^{†}Suspended operations.

== Scoring leaders ==
Note: GP = Games played; G = Goals; A = Assists; Pts = Points; PIM = Penalty minutes

Player	Team	GP	G	A	Pts	PIM
Doug Gibson	Rochester Americans	75	44	72	116	31
Peter Sullivan	Nova Scotia Voyageurs	75	44	60	104	48
Tom Cassidy	Springfield Indians	72	32	59	91	201
Pierre Laganiere	Providence Reds	75	25	61	86	44
Barry Merrell	Rochester Americans	74	44	41	85	32
Jerry Holland	Providence Reds	67	44	35	79	44
Rene Drolet	Virginia Wings	72	26	52	78	36
Dave Hynes	Rochester Americans	63	37	30	67	20
Tom Colley	New Haven Nighthawks	76	29	47	76	51

- complete list

== Calder Cup playoffs ==
Division Semifinals
N1	Providence	2
N4	Springfield	4
North Division
N2	Rochester	4
N3	Nova Scotia	2
S1	Virginia	1
N5	New Haven	4
South Division
S2	Richmond	3
S3	Hershey	4

Division Finals
N4	Springfield	4
N2	Rochester	2
N5	New Haven	4
S3	Hershey	1

Calder Cup Final
N4	Springfield	4
N5	New Haven	1

== Trophy and award winners ==
Team awards

Calder Cup; Playoff champions:	Springfield Indians
F. G. "Teddy" Oke Trophy; Regular Season champions, North Division:	Providence Reds
John D. Chick Trophy; Regular Season champions, South Division:	Virginia Wings

Individual awards

Les Cunningham Award; Most valuable player:	Doug Gibson - Rochester Americans
John B. Sollenberger Trophy; Top point scorer:	Doug Gibson - Rochester Americans
Dudley "Red" Garrett Memorial Award; Rookie of the year:	Jerry Holland - Providence Reds
Eddie Shore Award; Defenceman of the year:	Joe Zanussi - Providence Reds
Harry "Hap" Holmes Memorial Award; Lowest goals against average:	Ed Walsh & Dave Elenbaas - Nova Scotia Voyageurs
Louis A. R. Pieri Memorial Award; Coach of the year:	John Muckler - Providence Reds

Other awards

James C. Hendy Memorial Award; Most outstanding executive:	Fred T. Hunt
James H. Ellery Memorial Award; Outstanding media coverage:	Ron Rohmer, New Haven

== See also ==
- List of AHL seasons

Preceded by 1973–74 AHL season	AHL seasons	Succeeded by 1975–76 AHL season
