= 1975–76 AHL season =

- League: American Hockey League
- Sport: Ice hockey

Regular season
- F. G. "Teddy" Oke Trophy: Nova Scotia Voyageurs
- Season MVP: Ron Andruff
- Top scorer: Jean-Guy Gratton

Playoffs
- Champions: Nova Scotia Voyageurs
- Runners-up: Hershey Bears

AHL seasons
- 1974–75 1976–77

The 1975–76 AHL season was the 40th season of the American Hockey League. The league begins to give out three James H. Ellery Memorial Awards to the media, one each for outstanding newspaper, radio and television coverage of the AHL.

Eight teams played 76 games each in the schedule. The Nova Scotia Voyageurs finished first overall in the regular season, and won their second Calder Cup championship.

== Team changes ==
- The Syracuse Eagles cease operations.
- The Virginia Wings cease operations.
- The Baltimore Clippers resume operations.
- The New Haven Nighthawks switch divisions from North to South.

== Final standings ==
Note: GP = Games played; W = Wins; L = Losses; T = Ties; GF = Goals for; GA = Goals against; Pts = Points;

North	GP	W	L	T	Pts	GF	GA
Nova Scotia Voyageurs (AFM/MTL)	76	48	20	8	104	326	209
Rochester Americans (BOS)	76	42	25	9	93	304	243
Providence Reds (NYR/STL)	76	34	34	8	76	294	300
Springfield Indians (KCS)	76	33	39	4	70	267	321

South	GP	W	L	T	Pts	GF	GA
Hershey Bears (BUF/PIT)	76	39	31	6	84	304	275
Richmond Robins (PHI/WSH)	76	29	39	8	66	262	297
New Haven Nighthawks (DET/MNS)	76	29	39	8	66	261	295
Baltimore Clippers (WSH)	76	21	48	7	49	238	316

== Scoring leaders ==
Note: GP = Games played; G = Goals; A = Assists; Pts = Points; PIM = Penalty minutes

Player	Team	GP	G	A	Pts	PIM
Jean-Guy Gratton	Hershey Bears	73	35	58	93	38
Ron Andruff	Nova Scotia Voyageurs	74	42	46	88	58
Greg Holst	Providence Reds	69	37	44	81	77
Guy Chouinard	Nova Scotia Voyageurs	70	40	40	80	14
Gordie Clark	Rochester Americans	72	30	49	79	7
Pierre Mondou	Nova Scotia Voyageurs	74	34	43	77	30
Fred Speck	Baltimore Clippers	76	23	52	75	93
Larry Fullan	Richmond Robins	76	18	57	75	26
Wayne Schaab	Richmond Robins	75	36	36	72	31

- complete list

== Calder Cup playoffs ==
Division Semifinals
North Division
2	Rochester	3
3	Providence	0
South Division
2	Richmond	3
3	New Haven	0

Division Finals
1	Nova Scotia	4
2	Rochester	0
1	Hershey	4
2	Richmond	1

Calder Cup Final
N1	Nova Scotia	4
S1	Hershey	1

== Trophy and award winners ==
Team awards

Calder Cup; Playoff champions:	Nova Scotia Voyageurs
F. G. "Teddy" Oke Trophy; Regular Season champions, North Division:	Nova Scotia Voyageurs
John D. Chick Trophy; Regular Season champions, South Division:	Hershey Bears

Individual awards

Les Cunningham Award; Most valuable player:	Ron Andruff - Nova Scotia Voyageurs
John B. Sollenberger Trophy; Top point scorer:	Jean-Guy Gratton - Hershey Bears
Dudley "Red" Garrett Memorial Award; Rookie of the year:	Greg Holst - Providence Reds & Pierre Mondou - Nova Scotia Voyageurs
Eddie Shore Award; Defenceman of the year:	Noel Price - Nova Scotia Voyageurs
Harry "Hap" Holmes Memorial Award; Lowest goals against average:	Ed Walsh & Dave Elenbaas - Nova Scotia Voyageurs
Louis A.R. Pieri Memorial Award; Coach of the year:	Chuck Hamilton - Hershey Bears

Other awards

James C. Hendy Memorial Award; Most outstanding executive:	Macgregor Kilpatrick
James H. Ellery Memorial Awards; Outstanding media coverage:	Clayton Campbell, Nova Scotia, (newspaper); Arnie Patterson, Nova Scotia, (radio); Dick Galiette, New Haven, (television)

== See also ==
- List of AHL seasons

Preceded by 1974–75 AHL season	AHL seasons	Succeeded by 1976–77 AHL season
