= 1976 Calder Cup playoffs =

North American ice hockey tournament

Tournament details
- Dates: April 3–28, 1976
- Teams: 8

Final positions
- Champions: Nova Scotia Voyageurs
- Runner-up: Hershey Bears

The 1976 Calder Cup playoffs of the American Hockey League began on April 3, 1976. The top three teams from each division qualified for the playoffs. The two division winners earned byes for the Division Semifinals while the other two teams in each division played best-of-five series. The winners played best-of-seven series with the team that received the first round bye in their division. The winners of each Division Final played a best-of-seven series for the Calder Cup. The Calder Cup Final ended on April 28, 1976, with the Nova Scotia Voyageurs defeating the Hershey Bears four games to one to win the Calder Cup for the second time in team history. Coincidentally, the Voyageurs parent club, the Montreal Canadiens won the Stanley Cup in a four-game sweep over the Philadelphia Flyers, making them the first pair of teams in history to win both the AHL's Calder Cup and NHL's Stanley Cup in the same season. Even more impressive is that these same two teams would accomplish this feat again the following year.

== Playoff seeds ==
After the 1975–76 AHL regular season, the top three teams from each division qualified for the playoffs. The Nova Scotia Voyageurs finished the regular season with the best overall record. The two division champions earned byes to the Division Finals.

=== Northern Division ===
1. Nova Scotia Voyageurs - 104 points
2. Rochester Americans - 93 points
3. Providence Reds - 76 points

=== Southern Division ===
1. Hershey Bears - 84 points
2. Richmond Robins - 66 points
3. New Haven Nighthawks - 66 points

== Bracket ==
Division Semifinals
2	Rochester	3
3	Providence	0
2	Richmond	3
3	New Haven	0

Division Finals
1	Nova Scotia	4
2	Rochester	0
1	Hershey	4
2	Richmond	1

Calder Cup Final
N1	Nova Scotia	4
S1	Hershey	1

In each round, the team that earned more points during the regular season receives home ice advantage, meaning they receive the "extra" game on home-ice if the series reaches the maximum number of games. There is no set series format due to arena scheduling conflicts and travel considerations.

== Division Semifinals ==
Note: Home team is listed first.

=== Byes ===
- Nova Scotia Voyageurs (Northern Division regular-season champions)
- Hershey Bears (Southern Division regular-season champions)

=== Northern Division ===
==== (2) Rochester Americans vs. (3) Providence Reds ====
April 4	Rochester Americans	5 - 3	Providence Reds

April 7	Providence Reds	1 - 3	Rochester Americans

April 9	Rochester Americans	6 - 4	Providence Reds

Rochester won series 3 - 0

=== Southern Division ===
==== (2) Richmond Robins vs. (3) New Haven Nighthawks ====
April 3	Richmond Robins	4 - 1	New Haven Nighthawks

April 4	New Haven Nighthawks	1 - 2	OT	Richmond Robins

April 7	Richmond Robins	4 - 1	New Haven Nighthawks

Richmond won series 3 - 0

== Division Finals ==
=== Northern Division ===
==== (1) Nova Scotia Voyageurs vs. (2) Rochester Americans ====
April 12	Nova Scotia Voyageurs	6 - 2	Rochester Americans

April 14	Nova Scotia Voyageurs	5 - 3	Rochester Americans

April 16	Rochester Americans	1 - 5	Nova Scotia Voyageurs

April 18	Rochester Americans	3 - 6	Nova Scotia Voyageurs

Nova Scotia won series 4 - 0

=== Southern Division ===
==== (1) Hershey Bears vs. (2) Richmond Robins ====
April 10	Hershey Bears	2 - 4	Richmond Robins

April 11	Richmond Robins	3 - 4	Hershey Bears

April 13	Hershey Bears	3 - 1	Richmond Robins

April 16	Richmond Robins	5 - 7	Hershey Bears

April 17	Hershey Bears	2 - 1	Richmond Robins

Hershey won series 4 - 1

== Calder Cup Final ==
=== (N1) Nova Scotia Voyageurs vs. (S1) Hershey Bears ===
April 21	Nova Scotia Voyageurs	6 - 3	Hershey Bears

April 23	Nova Scotia Voyageurs	8 - 2	Hershey Bears

April 24	Hershey Bears	5 - 1	Nova Scotia Voyageurs

April 26	Hershey Bears	2 - 4	Nova Scotia Voyageurs

April 28	Nova Scotia Voyageurs	5 - 4	OT	Hershey Bears

Nova Scotia won series 4 - 1

== See also ==
- 1975–76 AHL season
- List of AHL seasons

Preceded by 1975 Calder Cup playoffs	Calder Cup Playoffs; 1976	Succeeded by 1977 Calder Cup playoffs
