= Rochester Americans =

American Hockey League team in Rochester, New York

- City: Rochester, New York
- League: American Hockey League
- Conference: Eastern
- Division: North
- Founded: 1956
- Home arena: Blue Cross Arena at the War Memorial (Capacity: 10,662); KeyBank Center (Capacity: 19,070) (select games)
- Colors: Red, white, blue
- Owner: Terry Pegula
- General manager: Stacy Roest
- Head coach: Michael Leone
- Captain: Matthew Peca
- Media: WGR Rochester; MSG Western New York; Democrat and Chronicle; AHL.TV (Internet)
- Affiliates: Buffalo Sabres (NHL); Orlando Solar Bears (ECHL)

Franchise history
- 1956–present: Rochester Americans

Championships
- Regular season titles: 6: (1964–65, 1967–68, 1973–74, 1982–83, 1990–91, 2004–05)
- Division titles: 14: (1964–65, 1965–66, 1967–68, 1973–74, 1977–78, 1982–83, 1986–87, 1989–90, 1990–91, 1996–97, 1998–99, 1999–00, 2000–01, 2004–05)
- Conference titles: 3: (1995–96, 1998–99, 1999–00)
- Calder Cups: 6: (1964–65, 1965–66, 1967–68, 1982–83, 1986–87, 1995–96)

The Rochester Americans (colloquially known as the Amerks) are a professional ice hockey team based in Rochester, New York. They are the American Hockey League affiliate of the National Hockey League's Buffalo Sabres. The team plays its home games at the Blue Cross Arena at the War Memorial. The Americans are the fourth oldest franchise in the AHL, and have the second longest continuous tenure among AHL teams in their current locations after the Hershey Bears.

Rochester was awarded a new franchise in June 1956, when the Pittsburgh Hornets were forced to suspend operations after their arena, the Duquesne Gardens was razed in an urban renewal project. With the Hornets franchise in limbo until a new arena could be built, there was room in the league for a team in Rochester.

The Americans' team colors are red, white and blue. The logo is a patriotic badge with "Americans" written in cursive script. They have won the Calder Cup six times, and lost in the Cup finals ten times.

== History ==
=== Before the Amerks ===
Hockey was popular in Rochester, a city known for its cold weather, as far back as the 1920s; the University of Rochester had a collegiate hockey team as early as 1906, and even at that time, East High School had already developed a successful program. Professional hockey arrived in 1935 in the form of the Rochester Cardinals, a member of the International Hockey League. The Cardinals, who played at Edgerton Park Arena, lasted only one season, compiling a 15–29–3 record and a host of financial difficulties.

In the early 1950s, with the Rochester Community War Memorial under construction, Montreal Canadiens manager Frank Selke promised an American Hockey League team to Rochester at some point in the future, with 1956 one target year that was mentioned. Demonstrative of the support for hockey in Rochester, 7,092 fans turned out for a game between the AHL Buffalo Bisons and the NHL Montreal Canadiens on November 21, 1955; the game ended in a 5–5 tie and sold out five days beforehand. When 60-year-old Duquesne Gardens in Pittsburgh was scheduled for demolition in 1956, it left the Pittsburgh Hornets without an arena and forced them to go idle, freeing up room in the AHL for a Rochester team.

Prior to the AHL franchise, the Arpeako Packers played before thousands at the new Rochester War Memorial. Center Sam Toth and Left Wing Ed House started the original group tasked to bring professional hockey to Rochester. The Central Hockey League was sold on Rochester as its next expansion city. The CHL told Toth and House the CHL was a league that promised more fans than the AHL due to the rougher, more violent product on the ice. Toth and House held out for the AHL and ended up losing out to the group backed by Canadians.

The AHL granted a group which included Rochesterians (and Amerks Hall of Fame members) Sam Toth and Ed House a conditional franchise for Rochester that June. The terms required that the group raise $150,000 of capital, two thirds of which was to be raised by the sale of stock in less than two weeks. When their effort to secure the funds failed to reach its goal, a new group, backed by Selke of the Canadiens and Conn Smythe of the Toronto Maple Leafs, was awarded the franchise. The Leafs and Canadiens each owned 27.5% of the team, with the balance sold to Rochester interests. The team was named the "Americans".

=== Early years (1956–1967) ===
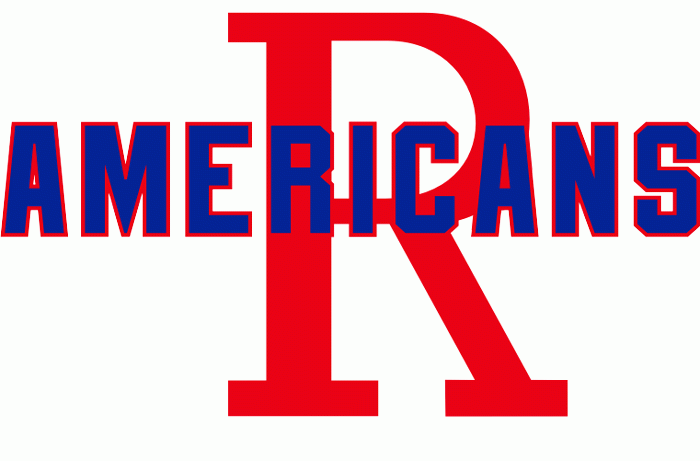
Original logo of the Americans

Upon entering the league for the 1956–57 season the Americans became a joint affiliate of both the Montreal Canadiens and the Toronto Maple Leafs of the National Hockey League, though the club was operated by the Canadiens. Under coach Billy Reay, the team finished in third place in the AHL standings and played the defending champion Providence Reds in the opening round of the Calder Cup playoffs. With Bobby Perreault in goal, the Americans defeated Providence and goaltender Johnny Bower in five games. Rochester then was defeated in a five-game final by the Cleveland Barons, who won the Calder Cup.

The Americans reached the playoffs in 1959, losing to the Buffalo Bisons in five games. The 1959 Americans were led by the "WHAM" line of center Rudy Migay, left wing Gary Aldcorn and right wing Billy Hicke. Migay and Hicke were named co-MVP for the AHL that season, and Hicke was chosen as the league's rookie of the year.

In the summer of 1959, the Maple Leafs bought out the Canadiens ownership share of the club, giving them a 55% controlling interest, due to concerns that with Montreal operating the club they were giving their prospects priority over those of the Leafs. They purchased most of the remaining 45% in 1963, boosting their ownership share to 98% by November 1964.

In 1959–60, the Americans became the first team in American Hockey League history to win a playoff series after trailing three-games-to-none. The Amerks' comeback against the Cleveland Barons included the efforts of the veteran Migay, right wing Pat Hannigan and league-leading goaltender Ed Chadwick. A crowd of 7,762 at the War Memorial witnessed a 4–1 triumph in Game 7. Rochester went on to lose the Calder Cup finals in five games to Eddie Shore's Springfield Indians.

Following the 1960–61 season, in which the Americans failed to qualify for the playoffs, the Montreal Canadiens transferred their working agreement to the Quebec Aces of the American Hockey League and sent Rochester players Guy Rousseau and Claude Labrosse to Quebec. As the exclusive affiliate of the Toronto Maple Leafs, the Americans made the playoffs the next two seasons but never contended for the Calder Cup championship. The Pittsburgh Hornets also returned with the opening of the Civic Arena in 1961, but Rochester was allowed to keep the Americans; the Hornets would eventually fold permanently in 1967 when the Pittsburgh Penguins started play as part of the 1967 NHL expansion.

Beginning in 1963–64, former Americans defenseman Joe Crozier became the team's coach and general manager. Under Crozier, the Americans won the Calder Cup in 1965, 1966 and 1968 and were finalists in 1967; they are the only team in AHL history to appear in the Calder Cup finals in four consecutive seasons.

In 1965–66, the Americans played their final 10 regular season and all playoff home games at neutral sites because the 1966 American Bowling Congress tournament occupied the War Memorial. The home games were at Toronto's Maple Leaf Gardens, about 180 miles (290 km) from Rochester, except for of one playoff game at Buffalo's Memorial Auditorium in the Calder Cup finals. On May 8, 1966, before a crowd of 7,655 at the "Aud" the Americans tied up the series at two games apiece with a 3–1 victory over the Cleveland Barons. Rochester went on to win the next two games and their second consecutive Calder Cup.

Notable players from this era included Bronco Horvath, Gerry Cheevers, Bobby Perreault, Al Arbour, Darryl Sly, Norm "Red" Armstrong, Duane Rupp, Wally Boyer, Dick Gamble, Stan Smrke, Jim Pappin, Don Cherry, Gerry Ehman, Larry Hillman, and Mike Walton. Alex Faulkner, the first person from Newfoundland and Labrador to play in the NHL, also played on the Amerks.

=== The expansion era (1967–1970s) ===
When the National Hockey League expanded from six to twelve teams for the 1967–68 NHL season the Americans lost several players. Arbour (St. Louis), and Boyer (Oakland), were drafted by the new NHL teams. Ehman was traded to Oakland and Horvath was loaned to Minnesota. Rupp and Walton were both promoted to the Maple Leafs while Smrke retired.

The Americans struggled through the early part of the 1967–68 AHL season. Just before Christmas, and with the team in last place with a record of 12-15-3, Crozier made a deal with the expansion Minnesota North Stars. In exchange for forwards J. P. Parise and Milan Marcetta the Americans received Ted Taylor, Len Lunde, George "Duke" Harris, Murray Hall, Don Johns, Carl Wetzel and the rights to Horvath. The return of Horvath marked his fourth tour of duty with the Amerks since 1956–57. The Americans improved to go 26-10-6 for the balance of the season en route to finish with the best record in the league. The regular-season champion Amerks then defeated the Hershey Bears four games to one in the playoff semi-finals and the Quebec Aces four games to two in the Calder Cup finals. The Amerks won the final game 4–2 before a crowd of 11,711 at the Colisée de Québec.

In July 1966, Maple Leaf Gardens Limited sold the team to a group which included their then general manager Punch Imlach for a reported $400,000. Two years later, the team was sold to the Vancouver Canucks of the Western Hockey League (WHL) minor league for a reported $950,000. Imlach was a part owner of the Canucks at the time. With the majority of the Rochester players transferred to Vancouver, Canucks won the 1968–69 and 1969–70 WHL Lester Patrick Cup championships, while the Amerks finished in last place each year. When Vancouver became the expansion Vancouver Canucks of the National Hockey League, they utilized the Amerks as their farm team.

After Rochester finished at the bottom of the AHL standings for four straight years and with local fan support dwindling, the Vancouver NHL team was prepared to either sell or fold the Rochester club. But the Americans were saved in the summer of 1972 when a group of eight Rochester businessmen, most notably Sam Toth, Richard Altier of Altier's Shoes, and Joe Fox, head of Rochester-based athletic-wear maker Champion Products, bought the Americans franchise from Vancouver and named Amerks defenseman Don Cherry as coach and general manager. Playing the next two seasons independent of any NHL affiliations, the Amerks qualified for the playoffs in 1972–73, losing to the Boston Braves in the first round. The next season, 1973–74, the Amerks went on to become regular season champions, but lost in the first round to New Haven.

The Boston Bruins hired Cherry as their coach in 1974–75 and became the Americans' parent team the same year. During the five seasons with the Bruins, the Amerks made the playoffs the first four years, losing in the Calder Cup finals in 1977 to Nova Scotia.

Prior to the 1979–80 season, the Americans were purchased by the Knox family, owners of the Buffalo Sabres (NHL) and became the Sabres' AHL affiliate. After the Knox brothers died in the 1990s, the Americans and Sabres were split up, with the Sabres going to John Rigas and the Americans being sold to Steve Donner. Despite the sale, the original Buffalo-Rochester partnership became the longest such NHL-AHL affiliation, lasting until the 2007–08 season, and revived for 2011–12. The proximity of the cities of Buffalo and Rochester is a significant advantage in that the Sabres are able to call up and send down players between the two teams with ease, as the two cities are only an hour's drive away from each other; Buffalo is the closest NHL city to Rochester, while Rochester is the closest AHL city to Buffalo. (The Hamilton Bulldogs, which existed as an AHL franchise from 1996 to 2015, were closer geographically to Buffalo than Rochester is, but played on the other side of the U.S.-Canada border)

During the original Sabres affiliation, the Americans won three Calder Cup championships and finished as runners-up another six times. They finished out of the playoffs only five times in 28 years.

=== 1980s–1990s ===
The Americans won the first of their "Sabres era" Calder Cups in 1983 under young coach Mike Keenan, sweeping Maine, 4–0.

In the 1986–87 season, the John Van Boxmeer-coached team won the division championship on the last game of the season against the Binghamton Whalers. The Americans were one point behind the Whalers and playing in Binghamton. After goalie Darcy Wakaluk paced the team to a tie in regulation and overtime, the game proceeded to the new "shoot-out" format used that season. As the shoot-out began, Van Boxmeer made one of the most memorable coaching moves in Americans history and pulled Wakaluk from the game, inserting usual starting goalie Darren Puppa who had sat out the game due to injury. Puppa stopped every shot and low-scoring defenseman Jack Brownschidle scored the winning goal. While the teams both finished with identical records (47-26-7), Rochester won the division based on having a better record in head-to-head competition.

The first round of playoffs saw the Americans play the rival Hershey Bears. However, the first two games were moved to the Buffalo Memorial Auditorium due to the Rochester War Memorial being previously booked for the Shrine Circus.

The second event of that memorable season occurred during pregame warmups of the second game. With no officials on the ice (a common occurrence at that time which was changed as a result of this game) a brawl broke out. Players from both teams received suspensions and tough-guy Andy Ristau received a concussion. The Americans won the game in overtime on a goal by defenseman Jim Hofford, who was a late addition to the lineup as a result of the brawl. The Americans went on to win the series, 4–1.

The Americans took on the Sherbrooke Canadiens in the finals and after five games found themselves down three games to two. Behind the leadership of NHL veteran Don Lever, the Amerks came from behind to win Game 6, 7–4, and won the championship in Sherbrooke.

After losing many players from that team to the NHL the following season, the Amerks struggled but returned to the finals in 1990 and 1991, losing both times to the Springfield Indians. They again lost in the finals to the Cape Breton Oilers in 1993.

After a very slow start in the 1995–96 season, the Americans came together midway through the season behind the dramatically improved goaltending of Steve Shields. The team breezed through the first three rounds of the playoffs before finally winning a hard-fought battle against the Portland Pirates to win their sixth, and most recent, Calder Cup.

=== 2000s ===
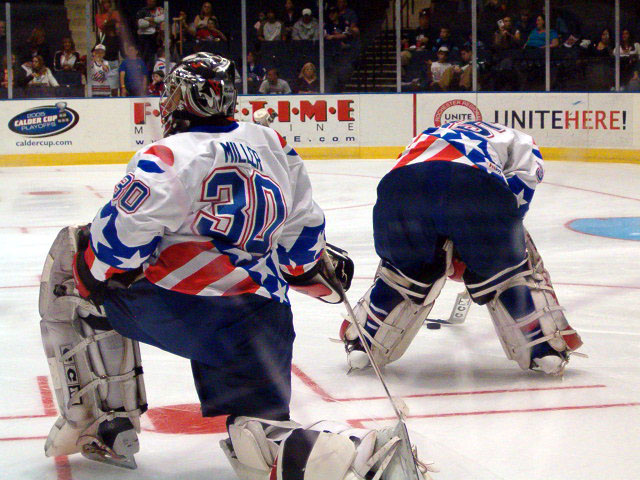
Ryan Miller with the Americans in 2005

In 2000, with the promotion of then-coach Brian McCutcheon to assistant coach with the Sabres, former Amerks player Randy Cunneyworth was named coach of the Amerks.

On November 12, 2003, the Sabres and the New Jersey Devils played in the first-ever NHL regular-season game in Rochester.

In the 2003–04 season, the Americans were beaten in five games by the eventual Calder Cup champion Milwaukee Admirals in the Western Conference Finals.

The Americans began a dual-affiliation in 2005 after signing an agreement with the Florida Panthers. Under this agreement the Panthers and Sabres both supplied the Americans with players while the Sabres still employed the coaching staff.

In 2007, the Sabres announced that season would be their last season of affiliation with the Americans. Reasons cited include the financial insecurity of the AHL team, issues between ownership, the City of Rochester, and Blue Cross Arena management, along with the awkwardness of the dual affiliation with the Panthers.

In 2008, the 29-year affiliation officially ended when Buffalo chose the Portland Pirates to be their new AHL affiliate. This separation lasted until 2011 when Terrence Pegula bought the Sabres and then later the Amerks, reuniting them shortly after the 2010–11 season concluded.

On May 6, 2008, the American Hockey League approved the sale of the Americans to Canadian businessman Curt Styres and his investment group, Arrow Express Sports. The sale also included the Rochester Knighthawks of the National Lacrosse League.

On May 13, 2009, Lewis Staats, president of the Americans, formally announced that Jody Gage would not return after 13 seasons as the team's general manager. Gage currently serves as the team's director of strategic planning.

=== 2010s ===
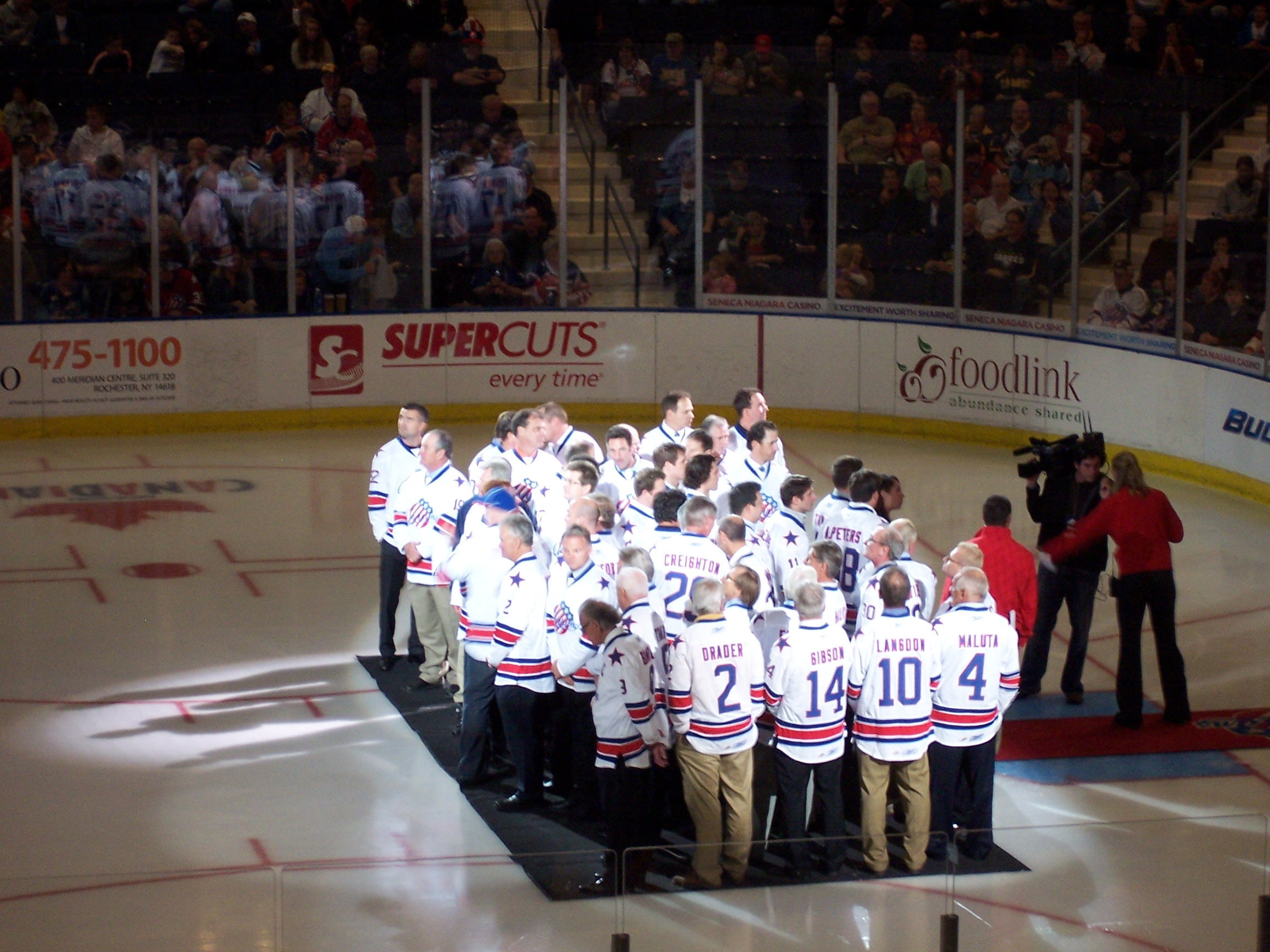
Americans alumni in an on-ice ceremony before the 2011 home opener

The Americans notched their 2,000th win on February 21, 2010, in a shootout against the Portland Pirates. Derek Whitmore, from the Rochester suburb of Greece was the last shooter for Portland but goaltender Alexander Salak made the save.

Head coach Benoit Groulx left the organization on May 31 after a reported conflict with vice-president of hockey operations, Ted Nolan.

On May 17, 2011, it was revealed that Terry Pegula had signed a nonbinding letter of intent to purchase the Americans. Pegula, who had recently purchased the Buffalo Sabres desired to re-affiliate the two clubs. The potential purchase had to clear several financial and legal obstacles; first, Pegula had to seek the permission of the Sabres' then current farm team, the Portland Pirates, since the Pirates had an agreement with the Sabres that lasted through 2014 and had no out clause. Second, the Americans' corporate sister club, the Rochester Knighthawks lacrosse team, was split off and retained by Styres as Pegula owned the rival Buffalo Bandits. After these arrangements were made, the agreement was reached June 24, 2011, with the official announcement following the same day. Pegula purchased the Americans for US$5 million.

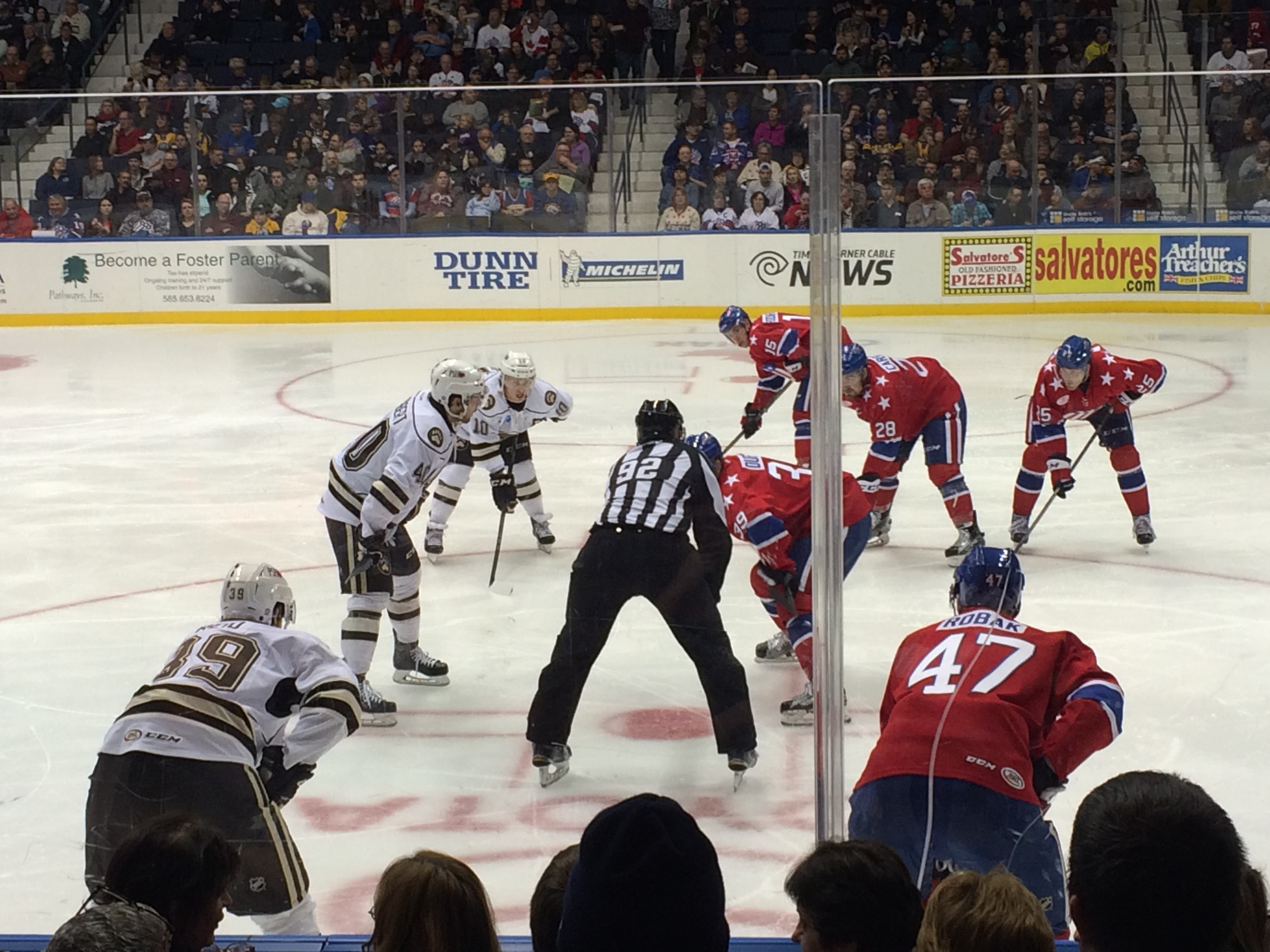
A faceoff during a Rochester Americans game in 2016.

For the 2013–14 season, the Americans participated in that year's edition of the AHL Outdoor Classic played at Frontier Field against the Lake Erie Monsters immediately before leaving to take part in the 2013 Spengler Cup, the first time in 17 years that an AHL team participated (the Americans were also the participants in the 1996 Spengler Cup).

On July 28, 2015, Randy Cunneyworth was re-hired as the Americans' head coach, returning after being the head coach for the Americans from 2000 to 2008. Cunneyworth was relieved of his duties the following season on May 16, 2016 and reassigned to a position in the Sabres' department of player development. Dan Lambert was named the new head coach. Lambert was fired at the end of the 2016–17 season after a clearing out of the coaching staff and management in Buffalo.

For the 2017 season, it was decided by new Sabres general manager Jason Botterill, that the Americans would have their own general manager and be modeled after how Botterill's previous team, the Pittsburgh Penguins, operated the Wilkes-Barre/Scranton Penguins. In June 2017, the Sabres' new assistant general manager Randy Sexton was also made the Americans' general manager and former Americans' player Chris Taylor was named head coach.

=== 2020s ===
Sexton was fired on June 16, 2020, along with Botterill. Taylor and the coaching staff were later also fired. Seth Appert was later hired as coach with Jason Karmanos as general manager as part of his Sabres assistant general manager duties.

During the 2021–22 season, the Americans finished 5th in the North division, which was also the final playoff spot in the North division, clinching the position on the final day of the regular season. During the first round of playoffs, the Americans faced off against the Belleville Senators in a best of three playoff series. The Americans would win two of the three games, both in overtime, with both scores resulting in a 4–3 win for the Americans. With the series win, it was the first postseason series win in 17 years, with the last before that coming in the 2005 Calder Cup playoffs. In the following round, they would upset the North division and regular-season Eastern Conference champion Utica Comets in five games. They would face the Laval Rocket in the North Division finals, but would lose in three games, including a triple-overtime loss in the final game of the series.

The Americans once again qualified for the playoffs following the 2022–23 season, and finished third in the North division. In the division semifinals, they faced off against rival Syracuse. They initially went down 2–0 in the series, but were able to win three games in a row to advance to the division finals. The Americans faced off against the division-winning Toronto Marlies in the division finals, sweeping them, and advanced to their first conference finals appearance since the 2004 Calder Cup playoffs.

== Season-by-season results ==
Regular season												Playoffs					
Season	Games	Won	Lost	Tied	OTL	SOL	Points	PCT	Goals for	Goals against	Standing	Year	Prelims	1st Round	Quarterfinals	Semifinals	Finals
1956–57	64	34	25	5	—	—	73	.570	224	199	3rd, AHL	1957	—			W, 4–1, PRO	L, 1–4, CLE
1957–58	70	29	35	6	—	—	64	.457	205	242	5th, AHL	1958	—			Did not qualify	
1958–59	70	34	31	5	—	—	73	.521	242	209	3rd, AHL	1959	—			L, 1–4, BUF	—
1959–60	72	40	27	5	—	—	85	.590	285	211	2nd, AHL	1960	—			W, 4–3, CLE	L, 1–4, SPR
1960–61	72	32	36	4	—	—	68	.472	261	244	5th, AHL	1961	—			Did not qualify	
1961–62	70	33	31	6	—	—	72	.514	234	240	3rd, West	1962	—		L, 0–2, BUF	—	—
1962–63	72	24	39	9	—	—	57	.396	241	270	3rd, West	1963	—		L, 0–2, CLE	—	—
1963–64	72	40	30	2	—	—	82	.569	256	223	2nd, West	1964	—		L, 0–2, CLE	—	—
1964–65	72	48	21	3	—	—	99	.688	310	199	1st, West	1965	—		W, 4–1, QUE	BYE	W, 4–1, HER
1965–66	72	46	21	5	—	—	97	.674	288	221	1st, West	1966	—		W, 4–2, QUE	BYE	W, 4–2, CLE
1966–67	72	38	25	9	—	—	85	.590	300	223	2nd, West	1967	—		W, 3–2, CLE	W, 3–1, BAL	L, 0–4, PIT
1967–68	72	38	25	9	—	—	85	.590	273	233	1st, West	1968	—		W, 4–1, HER	BYE	W, 4–2, QUE
1968–69	74	25	38	11	—	—	61	.412	237	295	4th, West	1969	—		Did not qualify		
1969–70	72	18	38	16	—	—	52	.361	253	315	5th, West	1970	—		Did not qualify		
1970–71	72	25	36	11	—	—	61	.424	222	248	4th, West	1971	—		Did not qualify		
1971–72	76	28	38	10	—	—	66	.434	242	311	5th, East	1972	—		Did not qualify		
1972–73	76	33	31	12	—	—	78	.513	239	276	3rd, East	1973	—		L, 2–4, BOS	—	—
1973–74	76	42	21	13	—	—	97	.638	296	248	1st, North	1974	—		L, 2–4, NH	—	—
1974–75	76	42	25	9	—	—	93	.612	317	243	2nd, North	1975	—		W, 4–2, NSV	L, 1–4, SPR	—
1975–76	76	42	25	9	—	—	93	.612	304	243	2nd, North	1976	—		W, 3–0, PRO	L, 0–4, NSV	—
1976–77	80	42	33	5	—	—	89	.556	320	273	3rd, AHL	1977	—			W, 4–2, NH	L, 2–4, NSV
1977–78	81	43	31	7	—	—	93	.574	332	296	1st, South	1978	—		BYE	L, 2–4, NH	—
1978–79	80	26	42	12	—	—	64	.400	289	349	4th, South	1979	—		Did not qualify		
1979–80	80	28	42	10	—	—	66	.413	260	327	4th, South	1980	—		L, 0–4, NH	—	—
1980–81	80	30	42	8	—	—	68	.425	295	316	5th, South	1981	—		Did not qualify		
1981–82	80	40	31	9	—	—	89	.556	325	286	2nd, South	1982	—		W, 3–1, NH	L, 1–4, BNG	—
1982–83	80	46	25	9	—	—	101	.631	389	325	1st, South	1983	—		W, 4–1, BNG	W, 4–3, NH	W, 4–0, MAI
1983–84	80	46	32	2	—	—	94	.588	363	300	2nd, South	1984	—		W, 4–3, SCS	W, 4–2, BAL	L, 1–4, MAI
1984–85	80	40	27	13	—	—	93	.581	333	301	3rd, South	1985	—		L, 1–4, BAL	—	—
1985–86	80	34	39	7	—	—	75	.469	320	337	6th, South	1986	—		Did not qualify		
1986–87	80	47	26	—	—	7	101	.631	315	263	1st, South	1987	—		W, 4–1, HER	W, 4–2, BNG	W, 4–3, SHE
1987–88	80	46	26	7	1	—	100	.625	328	272	2nd, South	1988	—		L, 3–4, ADK	—	—
1988–89	80	38	37	5	—	—	81	.506	305	302	5th, South	1989	—		Did not qualify		
1989–90	80	43	28	9	—	—	95	.594	337	286	1st, South	1990	—		W, 4–1, UTI	W, 4–2, BAL	L, 2–4, SPR
1990–91	80	45	26	9	—	—	99	.619	326	253	1st, South	1991	—	BYE	W, 4–1, HER	W, 4–0, BNG	L, 2–4, SPR
1991–92	80	37	31	12	—	—	86	.538	292	248	2nd, South	1992	—	W, 4–2, HER	W, 4–3, BNG	L, 1–2, ADK	—
1992–93	80	40	33	7	—	—	87	.544	348	332	2nd, South	1993	—	W, 4–1, UTI	W, 4–3, BNG	BYE	L, 1–4, CBO
1993–94	80	31	34	15	—	—	77	.481	277	300	4th, South	1994	—	L, 0–4, HER	—	—	—
1994–95	80	35	38	7	—	—	77	.481	333	304	4th, South	1995	—	L, 1–4, BNG	—	—	—
1995–96	80	37	34	5	4	—	83	.519	294	297	3rd, Central	1996	—	W, 3–0, ADK	W, 4–0, CRN	W, 4–1, SYR	W, 4–3, POR
1996–97	80	40	30	9	1	—	90	.563	298	257	1st, Empire State	1997	—	W, 3–0, SYR	L, 3–4, ALB	—	—
1997–98	80	30	38	12	0	—	72	.450	238	260	5th, Empire State	1998	—	L, 1–3, PHI	—	—	—
1998–99	80	52	21	6	1	—	111	.694	287	176	1st, Empire State	1999	—	W, 3–0, ADK	W, 4–2, HAM	W, 4–2, PHI	L, 1–4, PRO
1999–00	80	46	22	9	3	—	104	.650	247	201	1st, Empire State	2000	—	W, 3–2, ALB	W, 4–2, HAM	W, 4–0, HER	L, 2–4, HRT
2000–01	80	46	22	9	3	—	104	.650	224	192	1st, Mid-Atlantic	2001	—	L, 1–3, PHI	—	—	—
2001–02	80	32	30	15	3	—	82	.513	206	211	2nd, Central	2002	L, 0–2, PHI	—	—	—	—
2002–03	80	31	30	14	5	—	81	.506	219	221	2nd, Central	2003	L, 1–2, MIL	—	—	—	—
2003–04	80	37	28	10	5	—	89	.556	207	188	3rd, North	2004	BYE	W, 4–3, SYR	W, 4–0, HAM	L, 1–4, MIL	—
2004–05	80	51	19	—	4	6	112	.700	243	208	1st, North	2005	—	W, 4–0, HAM	L, 1–4, MTB	—	—
2005–06	80	37	39	—	2	2	78	.488	261	270	5th, North	2006	—	Did not qualify			
2006–07	80	48	30	—	1	1	98	.613	269	250	2nd, North	2007	—	L, 2–4, HAM	—	—	—
2007–08	80	24	46	—	6	4	58	.363	197	291	7th, North	2008	—	Did not qualify			
2008–09	80	29	43	—	0	8	66	.413	184	259	7th, North	2009	—	Did not qualify			
2009–10	80	44	33	—	2	1	91	.569	253	247	2nd, North	2010	—	L, 3–4, ABB	—	—	—
2010–11	80	31	39	—	5	5	72	.450	218	266	7th, North	2011	—	Did not qualify			
2011–12	76	36	26	—	10	4	86	.566	224	211	2nd, North	2012	—	L, 0–3, TOR	—	—	—
2012–13	76	43	29	—	3	1	90	.592	234	209	2nd, North	2013	—	L, 0–3, TOR	—	—	—
2013–14	76	37	28	—	6	5	85	.559	216	217	2nd, North	2014	—	L, 2–3, CHI	—	—	—
2014–15	76	29	41	—	5	1	64	.421	209	251	6th, North	2015	—	Did not qualify			
2015–16	76	34	38	—	3	1	72	.474	199	249	6th, North	2016	—	Did not qualify			
2016–17	76	32	41	—	0	3	67	.441	205	240	6th, North	2017	—	Did not qualify			
2017–18	76	37	22	—	11	6	91	.599	238	223	3rd, North	2018	—	L, 0–3, SYR	—	—	—
2018–19	76	46	23	—	5	2	99	.651	254	218	2nd, North	2019	—	L, 0–3, TOR	—	—	—
2019–20	62	33	20	—	4	5	75	.605	181	173	2nd, North	2020	—	Season cancelled due to the COVID-19 pandemic			
2020–21	29	11	15	—	2	1	25	.431	89	116	6th, North	2021	—	No playoffs were held			
2021–22	76	37	29	—	7	3	84	.553	254	270	5th, North	2022	W, 2–0, BEL	W, 3–2, UTI	L, 0–3, LAV	—	—
2022–23	72	36	27	—	6	3	81	.563	236	233	3rd, North	2023	BYE	W, 3–2, SYR	W, 3–0, TOR	L, 2–4, HER	—
2023–24	72	39	23	—	7	3	88	.611	234	239	2nd, North	2024	BYE	L, 2–3, SYR	—	—	—
2024–25	72	42	22	—	5	3	92	.639	238	191	2nd, North	2025	BYE	W, 3–0, SYR	L, 2–3, LAV	—	—
2025–26	72	31	31	—	6	4	72	.500	214	235	5th, North	2026	L, 1–2, TOR	—	—	—	—

=== Affiliations ===
- 1956–1960: Montreal Canadiens and Toronto Maple Leafs
- 1960–1967: Toronto Maple Leafs
- 1967–1968: Toronto Maple Leafs and Minnesota North Stars
- 1968–1969: Toronto Maple Leafs and Vancouver Canucks (WHL)
- 1969–1970: Vancouver Canucks (WHL)
- 1970–1972: Vancouver Canucks (NHL)
- 1972–1979: Boston Bruins
- 1979–1980: Buffalo Sabres
- 1980–1981: Buffalo Sabres and Quebec Nordiques
- 1981–2005: Buffalo Sabres
- 2005–2008: Buffalo Sabres and Florida Panthers
- 2008–2011: Florida Panthers
- 2011–present: Buffalo Sabres

== Players and personnel ==
=== Current roster ===
Updated November 19, 2026.

No.	Nat	Player	Pos	S/G	Age	Acquired	Birthplace	Contract
17	(United States)	Thomas Bordeleau	C	L	24	2026	Houston, Texas	Americans
35	(Canada)	Talyn Boyko	G	L	24	2026	Drumheller, Alberta	Americans
73	(Canada)	Matteo Costantini	C	L	24	2025	St. Catharines, Ontario	Americans
12	(Canada)	Riley Fiddler-Schultz (A)	C	L	24	2023	Edmonton, Alberta	Sabres
11	(Canada)	Zac Funk	LW	L	23	2026	Vernon, British Columbia	Sabres
55	(Canada)	Mason Geertsen	LW	L	31	2025	Drayton Valley, Alberta	Sabres
8	(United States)	Dennis Gilbert (A)	D	L	30	2026	Buffalo, New York	Sabres
65	(Canada)	Zack Hayes (PTO)	D	L	27	2026	Calgary, Alberta	Americans
82	(United States)	Caleb Jones	D	L	29	2026	Arlington, Texas	Sabres
83	(Russia)	Vsevolod Komarov	D	R	22	2024	Chelyabinsk, Russia	Sabres
16	(United States)	Trevor Kuntar	C	L	25	2025	Buffalo, New York	Sabres
36	(Canada)	Noah Laaouan	D	R	25	2023	Halifax, Nova Scotia	Americans
2	(United States)	Gavin McCarthy	D	R	21	2026	Clarence Center, New York	Sabres
28	(United States)	Aidan McDonough	LW	L	27	2026	Milton, Massachusetts	Sabres
72	(United States)	Carson Meyer	RW	R	29	2025	Powell, Ohio	Sabres
57	(Czech Republic)	Radim Mrtka	D	R	19	2025	Havlickuv Brod, Czech Republic	Sabres
63	(Canada)	Matthew Peca (C)	C	L	33	2026	Petawawa, Ontario	Americans
14	(United States)	Jason Polin	RW	R	27	2026	Holt, Michigan	Sabres
5	(United States)	Jack Rathbone	D	L	27	2024	West Roxbury, Massachusetts	Sabres
59	(United States)	Jake Richard	RW	R	22	2026	Jacksonville, Florida	Sabres
23	(United States)	Ryan Sandelin	C	R	27	2026	Hermantown, Minnesota	Americans
21	(United States)	Red Savage	C	L	23	2025	Scottsdale, Arizona	Americans
43	(United States)	Conor Sheary	LW	L	34	2026	Winchester, Massachusetts	Sabres
19	(United States)	Graham Slaggert	C	L	27	2023	South Bend, Indiana	Americans
40	(Sweden)	Liam Valente	LW	L	23	2026	Märsta, Sweden	Americans
31	(Canada)	Matt Villalta	G	L	27	2026	Kingston, Ontario	Sabres
45	(United States)	Brendan Warren	LW	L	29	2021	Carleton, Michigan	Americans

=== Retired numbers ===
The Rochester Americans have retired only two sweater numbers in their history.

- Number six retired in honor of Norm "Red" Armstrong following his death from a fall in a construction accident in 1974 at age 35.
- Number nine was later retired in honor of Dick Gamble and Jody Gage. Gage, known as "Mr. Amerk", broke Gamble's team scoring records with the Americans during his long tenure with the team. Gage then served as the Americans' general manager for 12 years, until May 2009.

=== Team captains ===
- Don Cherry, 1971–1972
- Chris Taylor, 2005–06
- Brandon Smith, 2006–07
- Drew Larman, 2007–08
- Rory Fitzpatrick, 2008–2010
- Colin Stuart, 2011–12
- Kevin Porter, 2012–13, 2017–2020
- Matt Ellis, 2013–2014
- Drew Bagnall, 2013-2015
- Cal O'Reilly, 2015–2017
- Steven Fogarty, 2020-2021
- Michael Mersch, 2021–2024
- Mason Jobst, 2024–2025
- Zach Metsa, 2025–2026
- Matthew Peca, 2026–present

=== Head coaches ===
Asterisk denotes number of Calder Cups won

- Billy Reay, 1956–57
- Roly McLenahan, 1957–58
- Bucko MacDonald, 1958
- Sam Pollock, 1959
- Steve Kraftcheck, 1958–61
- Jack Riley, 1961
- Johnny Crawford, 1961–62
- Rudy Migay, 1962–63
- Joe Crozier, 1963–68***, 1983–84
- Dick Gamble, 1968–71
- Peanuts O'Flaherty, 1971
- Doug Adam, 1972
- Don Cherry, 1972–74
- Dick Mattiussi, 1974–76
- Duane Rupp, 1976–78
- Gary Darling, 1978
- Ron Garwasiuk, 1978
- Pat Kelly, 1978–79
- Billy Inglis, 1979–80
- Mike Keenan, 1980–83*
- Jim Schoenfeld, 1984
- John Van Boxmeer, 1984–90*, 1992–95
- Don Lever, 1990–92
- John Tortorella, 1995–97*
- Brian McCutcheon, 1997–2000
- Randy Cunneyworth, 2000–08, 2015–2016
- Benoit Groulx, 2008–10
- Chuck Weber, 2010–11
- Ron Rolston, 2011–13
- Chadd Cassidy, 2013–2015
- Dan Lambert, 2016–2017
- Chris Taylor, 2017–2020
- Gord Dineen, 2019 (Note: Interim head coach while Taylor was in Buffalo.)
- Seth Appert, 2020–2024
- Michael Leone, 2024–present

=== American Hockey League Hall of Famers ===
AHL Hall of Fame Honored Members
Name	Seasons	Induction Year
Don Biggs	1990-91 (player)	2018
Don Cherry	1963-69, 1971-72 (player); 1971-74 (head coach)	2019
Gordie Clark	1974-78 (player)	2024
Dave Creighton	1958-61 (player)	2022
Joe Crozier	1959-61 (player); 1963-68, 1983-84 (head coach)	2012
Bill Dineen	1961-62 (player)	2014
Rene Drolet	1975-78 (player)	2025
Gerry Ehman	1960-67 (player)	2024
Jody Gage	1985-96 (player); 1996- (executive)	2006
Dick Gamble	1961-70 (player); 1968-71 (head coach)	2007
Denis Hamel	1997-2000, 2002-03 (player)	2020
Bronco Horvath	1956-57, 1962-70 (player)	2015
Brian Kilrea	1968-69 (player)	2018
Steve Kraftcheck	1958-62 (player)	2008
Michael Leighton	2005-06 (player)	2025
Al MacNeil	1956-60 (player)	2014
Willie Marshall	1958-59, 1971-72 (player)	2006
Mike Nykoluk	1956-58 (player)	2007
Bob Perreault	1956-57, 1962-63, 1965-69 (player)	2014
Noel Price	1956-58 (player)	2008
Art Stratton	1973-74 (player)	2015
Bill Sweeney	1967-69 (player)	2010
Jim Wiemer	1981-85, 1994-95 (player)	2026

== Franchise records and leaders ==
=== Single season ===
Goals: Paul Gardner, 61 (1985–86)
Assists: Geordie Robertson, 73 (1982–83)
Points: Geordie Robertson, 119 (1982–83)
Penalty minutes: Rob Ray, 446 (1988–89)
GAA: Martin Biron, 2.07 (1998–99)
SV%: Martin Biron, .930 (1998–99)

=== Career ===
Career goals: Jody Gage, 351
Career assists: Jody Gage, 377
Career points: Jody Gage, 728
Career penalty minutes: Scott Metcalfe, 1424
Career goaltending wins: Bob Perreault, 108
Career shutouts: Bob Perreault, 16
Career games: Jody Gage, 653
