= 1973–74 AHL season =

- League: American Hockey League
- Sport: Ice hockey

Regular season
- F. G. "Teddy" Oke Trophy: Rochester Americans
- Season MVP: Art Stratton
- Top scorer: Steve West

Playoffs
- Champions: Hershey Bears
- Runners-up: Providence Reds

AHL seasons
- 1972–73 1974–75

The 1973–74 AHL season was the 38th season of the American Hockey League. The league renamed its divisions, and the "East" Division became the "North" Division, and the "West" Division became the "South" Division. Twelve teams played 76 games each in the schedule. The Rochester Americans finished first overall in the regular season. The Hershey Bears and won their fifth Calder Cup championship.

This was the final season for the Cleveland/Jacksonville Barons as well as for the Boston Braves.

== Final standings ==
Note: GP = Games played; W = Wins; L = Losses; T = Ties; GF = Goals for; GA = Goals against; Pts = Points;

North	GP	W	L	T	Pts	GF	GA
Rochester Americans (independent)	76	42	21	13	97	296	248
Providence Reds (NYR)	76	38	26	12	88	330	244
Nova Scotia Voyageurs (MTL)	76	37	27	12	86	263	223
New Haven Nighthawks (MNS)	76	35	31	10	80	291	275
Boston Braves (BOS)	76	23	40	13	59	239	297
Springfield Kings (LAK)	76	21	40	15	57	251	327

South	GP	W	L	T	Pts	GF	GA
Baltimore Clippers (DET)	76	42	24	10	94	310	232
Hershey Bears (PIT)	76	39	23	14	92	320	241
Cincinnati Swords (BUF)	76	40	25	11	91	273	233
Richmond Robins (PHI)	76	22	40	14	58	248	320
Jacksonville Barons (independent)	76	24	44	8	56	244	334
Virginia Wings (DET)	76	22	44	10	54	216	307

== Scoring leaders ==
Note: GP = Games played; G = Goals; A = Assists; Pts = Points; PIM = Penalty minutes

Player	Team	GP	G	A	Pts	PIM
Steve West	New Haven Nighthawks	76	50	60	110	41
Marc Dufour	Baltimore Clippers	74	42	62	104	21
Art Stratton	Rochester Americans	76	24	71	95	118
Bobby Rivard	Baltimore Clippers	76	36	56	92	48
Barry Merrell	Rochester Americans	75	28	59	87	49
Rick Middleton	Providence Reds	63	36	48	84	14
Larry Fullan	Nova Scotia Voyageurs	76	37	47	84	19
Murray Kuntz	Rochester Americans	73	51	31	82	33
Doug Gibson	Boston Braves	76	31	51	82	16
Howie Menard	Baltimore Clippers	73	42	39	81	66

- complete list

== Calder Cup playoffs ==
Division Semifinals
1	Rochester	2
4	New Haven	4
Northern Division
2	Providence	4
3	Nova Scotia	2
1	Baltimore	4
4	Richmond	1
Southern Division
2	Hershey	4
3	Cincinnati	1

Division Finals
4	New Haven	0
2	Providence	4
1	Baltimore	0
2	Hershey	4

Calder Cup Final
N2	Providence	1
S2	Hershey	4

== Trophy and award winners ==
Team awards

Calder Cup; Playoff champions:	Hershey Bears
F. G. "Teddy" Oke Trophy; Regular Season champions, North Division:	Rochester Americans
John D. Chick Trophy; Regular Season champions, South Division:	Baltimore Clippers

Individual awards

Les Cunningham Award; Most valuable player:	Art Stratton - Rochester Americans
John B. Sollenberger Trophy; Top point scorer:	Steve West - New Haven Nighthawks
Dudley "Red" Garrett Memorial Award; Rookie of the year:	Rick Middleton - Providence Reds
Eddie Shore Award; Defenceman of the year:	Gordie Smith - Springfield Kings
Harry "Hap" Holmes Memorial Award; Lowest goals against average:	Jim Shaw and Dave Elenbaas - Nova Scotia Voyageurs
Louis A.R. Pieri Memorial Award; Coach of the year:	Don Cherry - Rochester Americans

Other awards

James C. Hendy Memorial Award; Most outstanding executive:	Arthur Whiteman
James H. Ellery Memorial Award; Outstanding media coverage:	George Taylor, Baltimore

== See also ==
- List of AHL seasons

Preceded by 1972–73 AHL season	AHL seasons	Succeeded by 1974–75 AHL season
