= 1972–73 AHL season =

- League: American Hockey League
- Sport: Ice hockey

Regular season
- F. G. "Teddy" Oke Trophy: Nova Scotia Voyageurs
- Season MVP: Bill Inglis
- Top scorer: Yvon Lambert

Playoffs
- Champions: Cincinnati Swords
- Runners-up: Nova Scotia Voyageurs

AHL seasons
- 1971–72 1973–74

The 1972–73 AHL season was the 37th season of the American Hockey League. Twelve teams played 76 games each in the schedule. The Cincinnati Swords finished first overall in the regular season, and won the Calder Cup championship.

== Team changes ==
- The New Haven Nighthawks join the AHL as an expansion team, based in New Haven, Connecticut, playing in the East Division.
- The Cleveland Barons move midseason to Jacksonville, Florida, becoming the Jacksonville Barons.
- The Tidewater Wings are renamed the Virginia Wings.

== Final standings ==
Note: GP = Games played; W = Wins; L = Losses; T = Ties; GF = Goals for; GA = Goals against; Pts = Points;

East	GP	W	L	T	Pts	GF	GA
Nova Scotia Voyageurs (MTL)	76	43	18	15	101	316	191
Boston Braves (BOS)	76	34	29	13	81	248	256
Rochester Americans (independent)	76	33	31	12	78	239	276
Providence Reds (NYR)	76	32	30	14	78	253	255
Springfield Kings (LAK)	76	18	42	16	52	265	344
New Haven Nighthawks (MNS/NYI)	76	16	40	20	52	246	331

West	GP	W	L	T	Pts	GF	GA
Cincinnati Swords (BUF)	76	54	17	5	113	351	206
Hershey Bears (PIT)	76	42	23	11	95	326	231
Virginia Wings (DET)	76	38	22	16	92	258	221
Richmond Robins (PHI)	76	30	36	10	70	272	280
Cleveland/Jacksonville Barons (independent)	76	23	44	9	55	251	329
Baltimore Clippers (independent)	76	17	48	11	45	210	315

== Scoring leaders ==
Note: GP = Games played; G = Goals; A = Assists; Pts = Points; PIM = Penalty minutes

Player	Team	GP	G	A	Pts	PIM
Yvon Lambert	Nova Scotia Voyageurs	76	52	52	104	84
Tony Featherstone	Nova Scotia Voyageurs	74	49	54	103	78
Morris Stefaniw	Nova Scotia Voyageurs	64	30	71	101	80
Bill Inglis	Cincinnati Swords	75	40	57	97	29
Jeannot Gilbert	Hershey Bears	74	29	42	71	24
Rene Drolet	Richmond Robins	76	34	53	87	30
Orest Kindrachuk	Richmond Robins	72	35	51	86	133
Rick Dudley	Cincinnati Swords	64	40	44	84	159
Danny Schock	Richmond Robins	74	48	36	84	37

- complete list

== Calder Cup playoffs ==
Division Semifinals
1	Nova Scotia	4
4	Providence	0
Eastern Division
2	Boston	4
3	Rochester	2
1	Cincinnati	4
4	Richmond	0
Western Division
2	Hershey	3
3	Virginia	4

Division Finals
1	Nova Scotia	4
2	Boston	0
1	Cincinnati	4
3	Virginia	2

Calder Cup Final
E1	Nova Scotia	1
W1	Cincinnati	4

== Trophy and award winners ==
Team awards

Calder Cup; Playoff champions:	Cincinnati Swords
F. G. "Teddy" Oke Trophy; Regular Season champions, East Division:	Nova Scotia Voyageurs
John D. Chick Trophy; Regular Season champions, West Division:	Cincinnati Swords

Individual awards

Les Cunningham Award; Most valuable player:	Bill Inglis - Cincinnati Swords
John B. Sollenberger Trophy; Top point scorer:	Yvon Lambert - Nova Scotia Voyageurs
Dudley "Red" Garrett Memorial Award; Rookie of the year:	Ron Anderson - Boston Braves
Eddie Shore Award; Defenceman of the year:	Ray McKay - Cincinnati Swords
Harry "Hap" Holmes Memorial Award; Lowest goals against average:	Michel Larocque & Michel Deguise - Nova Scotia Voyageurs
Louis A. R. Pieri Memorial Award; Coach of the year:	Floyd Smith - Cincinnati Swords

Other awards

James C. Hendy Memorial Award; Most outstanding executive:	Richard F. Canning
James H. Ellery Memorial Award; Outstanding media coverage:	Jerry Linquist, Baltimore

== See also ==
- List of AHL seasons

Preceded by 1971–72 AHL season	AHL seasons	Succeeded by 1973–74 AHL season
