= Virginia Wings =

American hockey team

- City: Norfolk, Virginia
- League: American Hockey League
- Operated: 1972–1975
- Home arena: Norfolk Scope
- Colors: Red, white
- Affiliates: Detroit Red Wings

Franchise history
- 1971–1972: Tidewater Wings
- 1972–1975: Virginia Wings

Championships
- Division titles: one 1974–75 South

The Virginia Wings were a professional ice hockey team based in Norfolk, Virginia of the greater Hampton Roads area. They were an affiliated farm team of the Detroit Red Wings, and a member of the American Hockey League for three seasons from 1972–73 to 1974–75. The Wings were previously known as the Tidewater Wings for the 1971–72 season. Their cross-state rivals in the AHL were the Richmond Robins.

The Wings won the John D. Chick Trophy as South Division champions of the regular season in 1974–75, which turned out to be their final season. After the Wings ceased operations, the Hampton Gulls would represent eastern Virginia at the AHL level for the 1977–78 season. The Wings franchise was granted suspension status until 1975, and then voluntarily withdrew from the league in 1976.

After the Wings ceased operations, professional hockey returned to the Hampton Roads metropolitan area numerous times:

- Hampton Gulls (1974–1977 SHL), (1977–1978 AHL)
- Tidewater Sharks (1975–1977 SHL)
- Hampton Roads Gulls (1982–1983 ACHL)
- Hampton Roads Admirals of the ECHL (1989–2000)
- Norfolk Admirals of the AHL (2000–15)
- Norfolk Admirals of the ECHL (2015–present)

== Yearly results ==
Season	Games	Won	Lost	Tied	Points	Winning pct (%)	Goals for	Goals against	Standing
1971–72	76	22	45	9	53	0.349	197	275	6th West
1972–73	76	38	22	16	92	0.605	258	221	3rd West
1973–74	76	22	44	10	54	0.355	216	307	6th South
1974–75	75	31	31	13	75	0.500	254	250	1st South

=== Playoffs ===
Season	1st round	2nd round	3rd round	Finals
1971–72	Out of playoffs			
1972–73	W, 4–3, Hershey	L, 2–4, Cincinnati	—	—
1973–74	Out of Playoffs			
1974–75	L, 1–4, New Haven	—	—	—
