= Boston Braves (AHL) =

- City: Boston, Massachusetts
- League: American Hockey League
- Operated: 1971–1974
- Home arena: Boston Garden
- Colors: Maroon, white, black
- Owners: Weston Adams; Storer Communications
- Affiliates: Boston Bruins

Franchise history
- 1971–1974: Boston Braves
- 1990–1993: Capital District Islanders
- 1993–2010: Albany River Rats
- 2010–present: Charlotte Checkers

Championships
- Division titles: 1 (1971–72)

The Boston Braves were a professional ice hockey team in Boston, Massachusetts. They were a member of the American Hockey League (AHL) from 1971 to 1974.

== History ==
The early 1970s saw an unprecedented boom in the popularity of hockey in the greater Boston area, fueled by the success of the Bobby Orr and Phil Esposito-led Boston Bruins. The Bruins had sold out all of their home games at the Boston Garden for years, and the team owners thought that placing their minor-league affiliate in the same arena made sense on several levels. Previously, the Bruins' top affiliates were the Hershey Bears of the AHL and the Oklahoma City Blazers of the Central Hockey League.

The team was named after the eponymous National League baseball team that had played in Boston until 1953 — which had been owned by Charles F. Adams, founder of the Bruins, during the 1930s. In the first season of the AHL Braves, under coach Bep Guidolin, the club tied for first place in its division with the Nova Scotia Voyageurs, finishing with a 41-21-14 record. The team featured future NHL players such as Dan Bouchard, Rich Leduc, Doug Roberts, Terry O'Reilly, Ross Brooks, Nick Beverley, Garry Peters, and Don Tannahill, while proving popular enough in Boston to set league records for single-game and single-season attendance that survived for decades.

In its second season, however, competition from the New England Whalers of the World Hockey Association (WHA) served to saturate the market. Furthermore, NHL expansion cost the team its best player, Bouchard, who had been picked by the Atlanta Flames, while WHA defections caused the recall of Brooks to the parent club and the departure of Roberts and Peters to the rival league. While scoring declined only slightly, the defense was notably poorer. The team still finished second in the division with a 34-29-13 mark, but attendance had nearly halved.

In the Braves' third and final season, the defense collapsed to the point where the team finished out of the playoffs after a 23-40-13 record. With attendance dwindling further and the ebbing of the hockey boom itself in New England, Bruins' management decided to suspend the team; the next season saw the Bruins affiliating with the Rochester Americans (whose coach and general manager, Don Cherry, had just become the Bruins' head coach.)

The Bruins maintained the franchise's existence for many years, paying a nominal fee to the league to keep it dormant, and reportedly planned to reactivate the franchise in 1981 by placing a team in the Centrum in Worcester. The rights were finally sold to Michael Cantanucci in 1990, who reestablished the team in Troy, New York as the Capital District Islanders.

== Team records ==
Single season

- Goals: Ron Anderson, 41, 1973
- Assists: Doug Gibson, 51, 1974
- Points: Gibson, 82, 1974
- Penalty minutes: Fred O'Donnell, 161, 1972

Career

- Career games: Neil Murphy, 214
- Career goals: Bob Gryp, 68
- Career assists: Rich Leduc, 80
- Career points: Leduc, 144
- Career penalty minutes: Leduc, 227

== Season-by-season results ==
Regular season

Season	Games	Won	Lost	Tied	Points	Goals for	Goals against	Standing
1971–72	76	41	21	14	96	260	191	1st, East
1972–73	76	34	20	13	81	248	256	2nd, East
1973–74	76	23	30	13	59	239	297	5th, North

Playoffs

Season	1st round	2nd round	Finals
1971–72	W, 4–1, Providence	L, 0–4, Nova Scotia	—
1972–73	W, 4–2, Rochester	L, 0–4, Nova Scotia	—
1973–74	Out of playoffs		
