= Baltimore Clippers =

Former professional minor league ice hockey team in Baltimore, Maryland

- City: Baltimore, Maryland
- League: AHL (1962–1976); SHL (1976–77)
- Operated: 1962–1977
- Home arena: Baltimore Civic Center
- Colors: Black, white, orange
- Affiliates: NHL (1962–1976); WHA (1975–1977)

Championships
- Regular season titles: 1 (1970–71)
- Division titles: 3 (1970–71, 1971–72, 1973–74)

The Baltimore Clippers were a minor league professional ice hockey team in Baltimore, Maryland, playing in the Baltimore Civic Center. The Clippers were members of the American Hockey League from 1962 to 1976, and then played one season in the Southern Hockey League. The team was managed by Terry Reardon for its first fourteen seasons, and won three division titles, but did not capture a Calder Cup title. Baltimore began as a farm team for the New York Rangers, and helped develop Hall of Fame players including Eddie Giacomin, Doug Harvey, Jacques Plante and Jean Ratelle. The Clippers also featured eight alumni who are now members of the AHL Hall of Fame. The team name "Clippers" was used by two previous professional hockey teams in Baltimore, and paid homage to local history in the Baltimore Clipper and the Port of Baltimore.

== History ==
The American Hockey League approved an expansion franchise for Baltimore on June 12, 1962. The approval came with the promise that the Baltimore Civic Center which would be the largest rink in the AHL at that time, would be completed no later than November 1, 1962. The team's fight song, "Win, you Baltimore Clippers", was composed by lyricist Winifred Davis, and music teacher Jack D. Martz Sr., to coincide with the team's founding in 1962.

The Clippers were a New York Rangers affiliate, for five seasons starting in 1962. The new Clippers had no connection to the Baltimore Clippers (1945–1949), or the Baltimore Clippers (1954–1956), other than the name, and the same public relations man, Robert Elmer. Since their arena was still under construction, training camp was held at the Wheat City Arena, where general manager Terry Reardon played as a junior. Red Sullivan was named the player-coach, and the camp included many players with connections to Brandon, Manitoba.

Baltimore won the first game of the 1962–63 AHL season on October 12, defeating the Springfield Indians, 6–4. On December 29, 1962, Sullivan was promoted to be head coach the New York Rangers, and was replaced by player-coach Aldo Guidolin. Dave Creighton led the team in scoring with 24 goals, and 72 points. The Clippers finished the season in third place in the east division. In the playoffs, they lost two games to one, to the Hershey Bears.

In the 1963–64 AHL season, Ken Schinkel led the team in scoring, with 23 goals, and 56 points. Player-coach, Aldo Guidolin was the third most penalized player in the league, with 165 minutes. Baltimore finished fourth place in the east division, out of the playoffs.

Jack Crawford was appointed head coach for the 1964–65 AHL season. Gord Labossiere led the team in scoring, with 38 goals, and 79 points. Baltimore finished third place in the east division. In the playoffs, the Clippers lost three games to two, versus the Hershey Bears.

Baltimore struggled early in the 1965–66 AHL season, and head coach Jack Crawford was fired on January 24, 1966. Terry Reardon took over coach duties, despite rumors that Red Sullivan was returning. Ken Schinkel led the team in scoring with 30 goals, and 75 points. The Clippers finished fourth place in the east division, and missed the playoffs.

In the 1966–67 AHL season, Reardon acquired Willie Marshall, who led the team in scoring with 33 goals, and 89 points. Marshall was third in the league in points, and Bob Plager led the league with 169 penalty minutes. Baltimore finished the season second place in the east division. In the playoffs, the Clippers defeated the Quebec Aces three games to two in the first round, then lost to the Rochester Americans three games to one, in the second round.

For the 1967–68 AHL season, Baltimore started an affiliation with the Pittsburgh Penguins for three seasons. Tom McCarthy led the team in scoring with 34 goals, and 83 points. Baltimore dropped into fourth place in the east division, and missed the playoffs.

Aldo Guidolin returned as head coach for the 1968–69 AHL season, on June 22, 1968. Baltimore picked up secondary affiliations with the Detroit Red Wings and Philadelphia Flyers for one season. Willie Marshall led the team in scoring with 26 goals, and 78 points. Sandy McGregor scored 44 goals, second most in the league, and Marshall tied for third most assists in the league with 52. Baltimore moved up to second place in the east division. In the playoffs, the Clippers lost to the Providence Reds, three games to one.

Rudy Migay was appointed head coach for the 1969–70 AHL season on September 11, 1969. Jim Bartlett led the team in scoring with 30 goals, and 58 points. Baltimore finished third place in the west division. In the playoffs, they lost four games to one, to the Montreal Voyageurs. After the season, Pittsburgh ended its affiliation, and reassigned Migay to coach the Amarillo Wranglers in the next season.

In the 1970–71 AHL season, Terry Reardon returned to the dual role of head coach and general manager, and the Clippers affiliated with the Detroit Red Wings for one season. Fred Speck led the team in points with 92, and Wayne Rivers had 38 goals. Baltimore had the top three scorers in the league, including Speck with 92 points, Marc Dufour with 82 points, and Rivers with 75 points. Speck also led the league in assists with 61, Rivers was second in goals scored, and Larry Johnston racked up the second most penalty minutes in the league with 198. Speck won the Les Cunningham Award as the league's most valuable player, the John B. Sollenberger Trophy as the league's top scorer, and the Dudley "Red" Garrett Memorial Award as the AHL Rookie of the Year. The Clippers finished first in the west division, to capture the John D. Chick Trophy. Reardon won the Louis A. R. Pieri Memorial Award, as the AHL Coach of the Year. In the playoffs, Baltimore fell in six games to the Providence Reds, ending the best team season to date.

Veteran defenseman Jim Morrison was appointed co-coach with Reardon for the 1971–72 AHL season, in addition to playing. Baltimore switched NHL affiliations to the California Golden Seals for the season. Pete Laframboise led the Clippers in scoring with 37 goals, and 81 points, followed by Joe Szura with 38 goals, and 76 points. Baltimore repeated their first place finish in the west division, winning another John D. Chick Trophy. In the playoffs, Baltimore defeated the Cleveland Barons four games to two in the first round, and then defeated the Cincinnati Swords in six games in the second round, to reach the league finals. Playing in their only Calder Cup finals appearance, Baltimore lost in six games to the Nova Scotia Voyageurs, and were outscored 8–21.

Baltimore's recent success was short-lived without any NHL affiliation during the 1972–73 AHL season. The Clippers finished sixth place in the west division, and last overall in the league, missing the playoffs. Bobby Rivard was the team's top scorer with 75 points.

Baltimore negotiated an affiliation with the Detroit Red Wings for the 1973–74 AHL season. Marc Dufour led the team in scoring, with 104 points. Dufour and teammate Howie Menard tied for third in the league with 42 goals, and Dufour finished second overall in points. The Clippers returned to first place, winning the south division, and the John D. Chick Trophy. In the playoffs, Baltimore defeated the Richmond Robins four games to one in the first round, but were swept in four games by the Hershey Bears in the second round.

Kent Douglas was appointed co-coach with Reardon for the 1974–75 AHL season, and Baltimore affiliated with the Kansas City Scouts for one season. By January 1975, the Clippers were in trouble financially. They had received an $80,000 subsidy from city in lieu of lease payments, giving up exclusive ice rights to the Baltimore Civic Center. The team formally folded on January 23, 1975, and cancelled the remaining 30 games on their schedule, citing poor attendance and debt. On the same day, the Michigan Stags of the World Hockey Association relocated to Baltimore. When the Clippers folded after 46 games, they were in last place with 38 points, and Bobby Rivard led the team with 37 points.

When the Baltimore Blades did not return for a second season, Reardon led the drive to resurrect the Clippers. On August 15, 1975, the AHL granted a provisional franchise to revive the Baltimore Clippers for the 1975–76 AHL season, as long as a lease could be secured at the Baltimore Civic Center. The Clippers were readmitted to league on August 26, 1975, when team ownership posted a $50,000 performance bond with league, and 1,700 season tickets had been sold. Baltimore affiliated with the Washington Capitals in the NHL, and the New England Whalers in the WHA for one season. Fred Speck returned to the Clippers, and led the team with 75 points scored. Don Grierson was fourth in goals scored in the league with 37, and Speck was third with 52 assists. Despite their efforts, the Clippers placed fourth in the south division, and last overall in the league.

On August 12, 1976, team owners announced that the Clippers were transferring to the Southern Hockey League, due to the higher costs of operating in the AHL, compared to being geographically closer to teams in the SHL and saving money on travel. The team had lost $250,000 in the previous season, and were unable to negotiate an NHL affiliation to help with costs. Reardon was relieved of his general manager duties, and reassigned to other business management, then later released as a cost saving measure. Larry Wilson was named the new coach and general manager on August 31. The Clippers affiliated with the Edmonton Oilers in the WHA for the 1976–77 Southern Hockey League season. On January 18, 1977, Wilson was appointed interim head coach of Detroit Red Wings, and Baltimore named Don Grierson a player-coach-general manager. The Southern Hockey League soon ceased operations when four of its teams folded due to financial reasons, and the final game was played on January 31, 1977. At that time, Grierson led the team, and tied for the league lead in goals with 30, led the league with 45 assists, and 75 points. Baltimore had accumulated the fourth most points during the season, when the league stopped play. In January 1978, the team's remaining possessions were auctioned off to pay outstanding debt claims.

== Major league affiliations ==
The Baltimore Clippers were affiliated with National Hockey League teams from 1962 to 1976, World Hockey Association teams from 1975 to 1977, and were independent in the 1972–73 season.

Parent	League	Years	Seasons
New York Rangers	NHL	1962–67	5
Pittsburgh Penguins	NHL	1967–70	3
Detroit Red Wings	NHL	1968–69; 1970–71; 1973–74	3
Philadelphia Flyers	NHL	1968–69	1
California Golden Seals	NHL	1971–72	1
Kansas City Scouts	NHL	1974–75	1
Washington Capitals	NHL	1975–76	1
New England Whalers	WHA	1975–76	1
Edmonton Oilers	WHA	1976–77	1

== Notable players ==
Fred Speck had possibly the best season for a Clippers' player in 1970–71, winning three league awards, including the Les Cunningham Award, John B. Sollenberger Trophy, and the Dudley "Red" Garrett Memorial Award Nine players from the Clippers have been inducted into the AHL Hall of Fame, and four have been inducted in the Hockey Hall of Fame.

Player	Position	Honors	Inducted
Eddie Giacomin	Goaltender	Hockey Hall of Fame	1987
Doug Harvey	Defense	Hockey Hall of Fame	1973
Jacques Plante	Goaltender	Hockey Hall of Fame	1978
Jean Ratelle	Center	Hockey Hall of Fame	1985
Jim Bartlett	Left wing	AHL Hall of Fame	2018
Dave Creighton	Center	AHL Hall of Fame	2022
Billy Dea	Center	AHL Hall of Fame	2017
Ralph Keller	Defense	AHL Hall of Fame	2016
Willie Marshall	Center	AHL Hall of Fame	2006
Jim Morrison	Defense	AHL Hall of Fame	2013
Marcel Paille	Goaltender	AHL Hall of Fame	2010
Harry Pidhirny	Center	AHL Hall of Fame	2011
Noel Price	Defense	AHL Hall of Fame	2008

== Coaches ==
Terry Reardon was the general manager of Baltimore for fourteen seasons, and coached the Clippers during nine seasons, winning the Louis A. R. Pieri Memorial Award in 1970–71, as the AHL Coach of the Year. In total, nine men were head coaches of the Baltimore Clippers 1962 to 1971, or co-coaches from 1972 to 1976.

Season(s)	Head coach(es)
1962–63	Red Sullivan, Aldo Guidolin
1963–64	Aldo Guidolin
1964–65	Jack Crawford
1965–66	Jack Crawford, Terry Reardon
1966–68	Terry Reardon
1968–69	Aldo Guidolin
1969–70	Rudy Migay
1970–71	Terry Reardon
1971–74	Terry Reardon & Jim Morrison
1974–76	Terry Reardon & Kent Douglas
1976–77	Larry Wilson, Don Grierson

== Attendance ==
Baltimore initially received above average fan support, compared to teams in its league. The city failed in its attempts for a major league team in the 1967 NHL expansion, or the subsequent NHL expansion era. Attendance began to drop in the early 1970s, and then the team faced competition with both the Washington Capitals, and the WHA in the 1974–75 season.

Season	Average attendance	
Season	Baltimore	League
1962–63	4,776	4,747
1963–64	5,281	4,856
1964–65	4,963	4,572
1965–66	3,946	4,433
1966–67	4,576	4,447
1967–68	4,895	4,860
1968–69	4,367	4,721
1969–70	6,082	4,617
1970–71	5,213	4,521
1971–72	2,910	4,915
1972–73	2,910	4,077
1973–74	3,083	3,364
1974–75	3,049	3,930
1975–76	3,304	3,761
1976–77	Data incomplete	

== Results ==
Season-by-season results in the regular season, and playoffs.

Season	League	Regular season								Playoffs		
Season	League	Games	Won	Lost	Tied	Points	Goals for	Goals against	Standing	1st round	2nd round	Finals
1962–63	AHL	72	35	30	7	77	226	244	3rd, east	L, 1-2, Hershey	—	—
1963–64	AHL	72	32	37	3	67	200	220	4th, east	Out of playoffs		
1964–65	AHL	72	35	32	5	75	275	249	3rd, east	L, 2-3, Hershey	—	—
1965–66	AHL	72	27	43	2	56	212	254	4th, east	Out of playoffs		
1966–67	AHL	72	35	27	10	80	252	247	2nd, east	W, 3-2, Quebec	L, 1-3, Rochester	—
1967–68	AHL	72	28	34	10	66	236	255	4th, east	Out of playoffs		
1968–69	AHL	74	33	34	7	73	266	257	2nd, east	L, 1-3, Providence	—	—
1969–70	AHL	72	25	30	17	67	230	252	3rd, west	L, 1-4, Montreal	—	—
1970–71	AHL	72	40	23	9	89	263	224	1st, west	L, 2-4, Providence	—	—
1971–72	AHL	76	34	31	11	79	240	249	1st, west	W, 4-2, Cleveland	W, 4-2, Cincinnati	L, 2-4, Nova Scotia
1972–73	AHL	76	17	48	11	45	210	315	6th, west	Out of playoffs		
1973–74	AHL	76	42	24	10	94	310	232	1st, south	W, 4-1, Richmond	L, 0-4, Hershey	—
1974–75	AHL	46	14	22	10	38	136	180	5th, south	Did not complete season		
1975–76	AHL	76	21	48	7	49	238	316	4th, south	Out of playoffs		
1976–77	SHL	47	21	24	2	44	182	169	4th, SHL	League folded January 31st		
