= Richmond Robins =

- City: Richmond, Virginia
- League: American Hockey League
- Operated: 1971–1976
- Home arena: Richmond Coliseum
- Affiliates: Philadelphia Flyers

Franchise history
- 1928–1971: Quebec Aces
- 1971–1976: Richmond Robins

The Richmond Robins were a professional ice hockey team based in Richmond, Virginia. They were a member of the American Hockey League for five seasons from 1971–72 to 1975–76. Their cross-state rivals in the AHL were the Virginia Wings.

The Robins were previously known as the Quebec Aces until the parent club, the Philadelphia Flyers, transferred the Aces to Virginia after the 1970–71 season.

== Season-by-season results ==
=== Regular season ===
| Season | Games | Won | Lost | Tied | Points | Winning Pct (%) | Goals for | Goals against | Standing |
|---|---|---|---|---|---|---|---|---|---|
| 1971–72 | 76 | 29 | 34 | 13 | 71 | 0.467 | 237 | 218 | 5th West |
| 1972–73 | 76 | 30 | 36 | 10 | 70 | 0.461 | 272 | 280 | 4th West |
| 1973–74 | 76 | 22 | 40 | 14 | 58 | 0.382 | 248 | 320 | 4th South |
| 1974–75 | 75 | 29 | 39 | 7 | 65 | 0.433 | 261 | 293 | 2nd South |
| 1975–76 | 76 | 29 | 39 | 8 | 66 | 0.434 | 262 | 297 | 2nd South |

=== Playoffs ===
| Season | 1st round | 2nd round | Finals |
|---|---|---|---|
| 1971–72 | Out of playoffs | | |
| 1972–73 | L, 4-0, Cincinnati | — | — |
| 1973–74 | L, 4-1, Baltimore | — | — |
| 1974–75 | L, 4-3, Hershey | — | — |
| 1975–76 | W, 3-0, New Haven | L, 4-1, Hershey | — |

== Notable Robins ==
- Bobby Taylor - Philadelphia Flyers/Tampa Bay Lightning announcer
- Dave Schultz
- Orest Kindrachuk
- Jimmy Watson
- Steve Coates
