= Cincinnati Swords =

Former American ice hockey team

- City: Cincinnati, Ohio
- League: American Hockey League
- Operated: 1971–1974
- Home arena: Cincinnati Gardens
- Colors: Navy, yellow
- Affiliates: Buffalo Sabres

Championships
- Regular season titles: 1 (1972–73)
- Division titles: 1 (1972–73)
- Calder Cups: 1 (1972–73)

The Cincinnati Swords were an American Hockey League team that played at the Cincinnati Gardens in Cincinnati, Ohio from 1971 to 1974. They were owned by and the affiliate of the Buffalo Sabres of the National Hockey League.

== History ==
The Swords were founded in 1971 when the newly created NHL team, the Buffalo Sabres, exercised their option to create their own AHL farm team to replace the team they forced out of the AHL, the Buffalo Bisons. The Sabres had wished to place the team in South Florida, but the AHL balked because a team there would have effectively been isolated from the rest of the league; their nearest rivals would have been the Tidewater Wings, over 500 miles away. Furthermore, the only sizable sports arena in the region, the Hollywood Sportatorium, had severe structural flaws that made it unsuitable as a professional sports venue. The Sabres then proposed to base the team in Cincinnati. Eventually, a team moved to Florida when the cross state rival Cleveland Barons moved to Jacksonville in 1973.

Although they were in existence for only three years, the Swords were immensely popular with Cincinnati fans. They qualified for the playoffs in their first season; they swept the Hershey Bears and lost 4-2 to the Baltimore Clippers in the second round. In 1972–73, the Swords broke numerous AHL records, including most points in a season (113), most wins in a season (54), most homes wins (32), most road wins (22), most points at home (65), and most points in road games (48). They outscored opponents 351-206. After a sweep over the Richmond Robins and a 4-2 series win over the Virginia Wings in the first and second rounds of the playoffs, the Cincinnati Swords defeated the defending league champions, the Nova Scotia Voyageurs to win the Calder Cup - one of the youngest AHL teams to take the title. The third season was the final one for the Swords; in the playoffs, they lost to the eventual Calder Cup champions, the Hershey Bears, 4-1.

In 1974, Cincinnati was granted an expansion franchise in the World Hockey Association, the Cincinnati Stingers, to begin play in 1975-76. Despite the Swords' popularity, the Sabres were not willing to compete with a WHA team and folded the Swords after the 1973–74 season.

In 2017, the Sabres once again established a farm team relationship with a Cincinnati hockey team when they affiliated with the ECHL's Cincinnati Cyclones.

== Alumni ==
=== American Hockey League Hall of Famers ===
AHL Hall of Fame Honored Members
Name	Seasons	Induction Year
Joe Crozier	1971-72 (head coach)	2012

== Season-by-season results ==
=== Regular season ===
Season	Games	Won	Lost	Tied	Points	Goals for	Goals against	Standing
1971–72	76	30	28	18	78	252	258	3rd, West
1972–73	76	54	17	5	113	351	206	1st, West
1973–74	76	40	25	11	91	273	233	3rd, South

=== Playoffs ===
Season	1st round	2nd round	Finals
1971–72	W, 4-0, Hershey	L, 2-4, Baltimore	—
1972–73	W, 4-0, Richmond	W, 4-2, Virginia	W, 4-1, Nova Scotia
1973–74	L, 1-4, Hershey	—	—
