= 1986 Calder Cup playoffs =

North American ice hockey tournament

Tournament details
- Dates: April 9 – May 21, 1986
- Teams: 8

Final positions
- Champions: Adirondack Red Wings
- Runner-up: Hershey Bears

The 1986 Calder Cup playoffs of the American Hockey League began on April 9, 1986. The eight teams that qualified, four from each division, played best-of-seven series for Division Semifinals and Division Finals. The division champions played a best-of-seven series for the Calder Cup. The Calder Cup Final ended on May 21, 1986, with the Adirondack Red Wings defeating the Hershey Bears four games to two to win the Calder Cup for the second time in team history. Hershey's Tim Tookey won the Jack A. Butterfield Trophy as AHL playoff MVP, becoming the first player from the losing finalist to win the award.

== Playoff seeds ==
After the 1985–86 AHL regular season, the top four teams from each division qualified for the playoffs. The Hershey Bears finished the regular season with the best overall record.

=== Northern Division ===
1. Adirondack Red Wings - 90 points
2. Maine Mariners - 89 points
3. Moncton Golden Flames - 80 points
4. Fredericton Express - 78 points

=== Southern Division ===
1. Hershey Bears - 99 points
2. Binghamton Whalers - 87 points
3. St. Catharines Saints - 81 points
4. New Haven Nighthawks - 79 points

== Bracket ==
Division Semifinals
1	Adirondack	4
4	Fredericton	2
Northern Division
2	Maine	1
3	Moncton	4
1	Hershey	4
4	New Haven	1
Southern Division
2	Binghamton	2
3	St. Catharines	4

Division Finals
1	Adirondack	4
3	Moncton	1
1	Hershey	4
3	St. Catharines	3

Calder Cup Final
N1	Adirondack	4
S1	Hershey	2

In each round, the team that earned more points during the regular season receives home ice advantage, meaning they receive the "extra" game on home-ice if the series reaches the maximum number of games. There is no set series format due to arena scheduling conflicts and travel considerations.

== Division Semifinals ==
Note: Home team is listed first.

=== Northern Division ===
==== (1) Adirondack Red Wings vs. (4) Fredericton Express ====
April 10	Adirondack Red Wings	5 - 4	Fredericton Express

April 12	Adirondack Red Wings	1 - 4	Fredericton Express

April 14	Fredericton Express	4 - 5	Adirondack Red Wings

April 16	Fredericton Express	9 - 3	Adirondack Red Wings

April 18	Adirondack Red Wings	9 - 3	Fredericton Express

April 20	Fredericton Express	4 - 5	2OT	Adirondack Red Wings

Adirondack won series 4 – 2

==== (2) Maine Mariners vs. (3) Moncton Golden Flames ====
April 10	Maine Mariners	3 - 2	Moncton Golden Flames

April 13	Maine Mariners	2 - 3	Moncton Golden Flames

April 14	Moncton Golden Flames	2 - 1	Maine Mariners

April 18	Moncton Golden Flames	4 - 3	3OT	Maine Mariners

April 19	Maine Mariners	2 - 3	Moncton Golden Flames

Moncton won series 4 - 1

=== Southern Division ===
==== (1) Hershey Bears vs. (4) New Haven Nighthawks ====
April 9	Hershey Bears	3 - 4	2OT	New Haven Nighthawks

April 12	Hershey Bears	6 - 0	New Haven Nighthawks

April 13	New Haven Nighthawks	3 - 4	Hershey Bears

April 15	New Haven Nighthawks	4 - 5	Hershey Bears

April 16	Hershey Bears	5 - 4	New Haven Nighthawks

Hershey won series 4 - 1

==== (2) Binghamton Whalers vs. (3) St. Catharines Saints ====
April 9	Binghamton Whalers	5 - 1	St. Catharines Saints

April 11	Binghamton Whalers	1 - 4	St. Catharines Saints

April 13	St. Catharines Saints	3 - 5	Binghamton Whalers

April 15	St. Catharines Saints	4 - 3	Binghamton Whalers

April 16	Binghamton Whalers	3 - 4	St. Catharines Saints

April 18	St. Catharines Saints	7 - 3	Binghamton Whalers

St. Catharines won series 4 - 2

== Division Finals ==
=== Northern Division ===
==== (1) Adirondack Red Wings vs. (3) Moncton Golden Flames ====
April 24	Adirondack Red Wings	6 - 2	Moncton Golden Flames

April 26	Adirondack Red Wings	2 - 1	Moncton Golden Flames

April 30	Moncton Golden Flames	4 - 6	Adirondack Red Wings

May 2	Moncton Golden Flames	6 - 5	2OT	Adirondack Red Wings

May 4	Adirondack Red Wings	3 - 2	2OT	Moncton Golden Flames

Adirondack won series 4 - 1

=== Southern Division ===
==== (1) Hershey Bears vs. (3) St. Catharines Saints ====
April 23	Hershey Bears	4 - 6	St. Catharines Saints

April 26	Hershey Bears	4 - 2	St. Catharines Saints

April 28	St. Catharines Saints	1 - 3	Hershey Bears

April 30	St. Catharines Saints	2 - 4	Hershey Bears

May 3	Hershey Bears	1 - 2	St. Catharines Saints

May 5	St. Catharines Saints	7 - 2	Hershey Bears

May 7	Hershey Bears	4 - 2	St. Catharines Saints

Hershey won series 4 - 3

== Calder Cup Final ==
=== (S1) Hershey Bears vs.(N1) Adirondack Red Wings ===
May 10	Hershey Bears	5 - 4	2OT	Adirondack Red Wings

May 13	Hershey Bears	4 - 5	Adirondack Red Wings

May 15	Adirondack Red Wings	5 - 2	Hershey Bears

May 17	Adirondack Red Wings	4 - 3	3OT	Hershey Bears

May 18	Hershey Bears	2 - 1	Adirondack Red Wings

May 21	Adirondack Red Wings	7 - 3	Hershey Bears

Adirondack won series 4 - 2

== See also ==
- 1985–86 AHL season
- List of AHL seasons

Preceded by 1985 Calder Cup playoffs	Calder Cup playoffs 1986	Succeeded by 1987 Calder Cup playoffs
