= 1988 Calder Cup playoffs =

North American ice hockey tournament

Tournament details
- Dates: April 6 – May 12, 1988
- Teams: 8

Final positions
- Champions: Hershey Bears
- Runners-up: Fredericton Express

The 1988 Calder Cup playoffs of the American Hockey League began on April 6, 1988. The eight teams that qualified, four from each division, played best-of-seven series for Division Semifinals and Division Finals. The division champions played a best-of-seven series for the Calder Cup. The Calder Cup Final ended on May 12, 1988, with the Hershey Bears defeating the Fredericton Express four games to zero to win the Calder Cup for the seventh time in team history. Hershey went an unprecedented 12-0 during their Calder Cup run, which also set an AHL record for most consecutive games won in one playoff. Hershey's Wendell Young won the Jack A. Butterfield Trophy as AHL playoff MVP.

== Playoff seeds ==
After the 1987–88 AHL regular season, the top four teams from each division qualified for the playoffs. The Hershey Bears finished the regular season with the best overall record.

=== Northern Division ===
1. Maine Mariners - 99 points
2. Fredericton Express - 95 points
3. Sherbrooke Canadiens - 89 points
4. Nova Scotia Oilers - 81 points

=== Southern Division ===
1. Hershey Bears - 105 points
2. Rochester Americans - 100 points
3. Adirondack Red Wings - 99 points
4. Binghamton Whalers - 87 points

== Bracket ==
Division Semifinals
1	Maine	4
4	Nova Scotia	1
Northern Division
2	Fredericton	4
3	Sherbrooke	2
1	Hershey	4
4	Binghamton	0
Southern Division
2	Rochester	3
3	Adirondack	4

Division Finals
1	Maine	1
2	Fredericton	4
1	Hershey	4
3	Adirondack	0

Calder Cup Final
N2	Fredericton	0
S1	Hershey	4

In each round, the team that earned more points during the regular season receives home ice advantage, meaning they receive the "extra" game on home-ice if the series reaches the maximum number of games. There is no set series format due to arena scheduling conflicts and travel considerations.

== Division Semifinals ==
Note: Home team is listed first.

=== Northern Division ===
==== (1) Maine Mariners vs. (4) Nova Scotia Oilers ====
April 7	Maine Mariners	5 - 4	OT	Nova Scotia Oilers

April 11	Maine Mariners	6 - 5	OT	Nova Scotia Oilers

April 13	Nova Scotia Oilers	7 - 4	Maine Mariners

April 15	Nova Scotia Oilers	1 - 4	Maine Mariners

April 16	Maine Mariners	3 - 1	Nova Scotia Oilers

Maine won series 4 – 1

==== (2) Fredericton Express vs. (3) Sherbrooke Canadiens ====
April 8	Fredericton Express	4 - 3	OT	Sherbrooke Canadiens

April 9	Fredericton Express	3 - 2	Sherbrooke Canadiens

April 11	Sherbrooke Canadiens	2 - 1	OT	Fredericton Express

April 13	Sherbrooke Canadiens	4 - 3	Fredericton Express

April 16	Fredericton Express	7 - 1	Sherbrooke Canadiens

April 19	Sherbrooke Canadiens	3 - 4	Fredericton Express

Fredericton won series 4 - 2

=== Southern Division ===
==== (1) Hershey Bears vs. (4) Binghamton Whalers ====
April 6	Hershey Bears	3 - 2	OT	Binghamton Whalers

April 8	Binghamton Whalers	1 - 4	Hershey Bears

April 9	Hershey Bears	4 - 3	OT	Binghamton Whalers

April 11	Binghamton Whalers	5 - 8	Hershey Bears

Hershey won series 4 - 0

==== (2) Rochester Americans vs. (3) Adirondack Red Wings ====
April 8	Rochester Americans	6 - 4	Adirondack Red Wings

April 10	Rochester Americans	5 - 3	Adirondack Red Wings

April 13	Adirondack Red Wings	2 - 1	Rochester Americans

April 15	Adirondack Red Wings	5 - 4	OT	Rochester Americans

April 17	Rochester Americans	5 - 3	Adirondack Red Wings

April 19	Adirondack Red Wings	5 - 4	OT	Rochester Americans

April 21	Rochester Americans	4 - 6	Adirondack Red Wings

Adirondack won series 4 - 3

== Division Finals ==
=== Northern Division ===
==== (1) Maine Mariners vs. (2) Fredericton Express ====
April 24	Maine Mariners	5 - 6	OT	Fredericton Express

April 27	Maine Mariners	2 - 3	OT	Fredericton Express

April 30	Fredericton Express	5 - 3	Maine Mariners

May 2	Fredericton Express	5 - 7	Maine Mariners

May 5	Maine Mariners	3 - 6	Fredericton Express

Fredericton won series 4 - 1

=== Southern Division ===
==== (1) Hershey Bears vs. (3) Adirondack Red Wings ====
April 23	Hershey Bears	5 - 1	Adirondack Red Wings

April 25	Hershey Bears	6 - 2	Adirondack Red Wings

April 27	Adirondack Red Wings	4 - 6	Hershey Bears

April 28	Adirondack Red Wings	5 - 6	2OT	Hershey Bears

Hershey won series 4 - 0

== Calder Cup Final ==
=== (S1) Hershey Bears vs. (N2) Fredericton Express ===
May 8	Hershey Bears	4 - 0	Fredericton Express

May 9	Hershey Bears	5 - 2	Fredericton Express

May 11	Fredericton Express	1 - 5	Hershey Bears

May 12	Fredericton Express	2 - 4	Hershey Bears

Hershey won series 4 - 0

== See also ==
- 1987–88 AHL season
- List of AHL seasons

Preceded by 1987 Calder Cup playoffs	Calder Cup Playoffs; 1988	Succeeded by 1989 Calder Cup playoffs
