= List of Calder Cup champions =

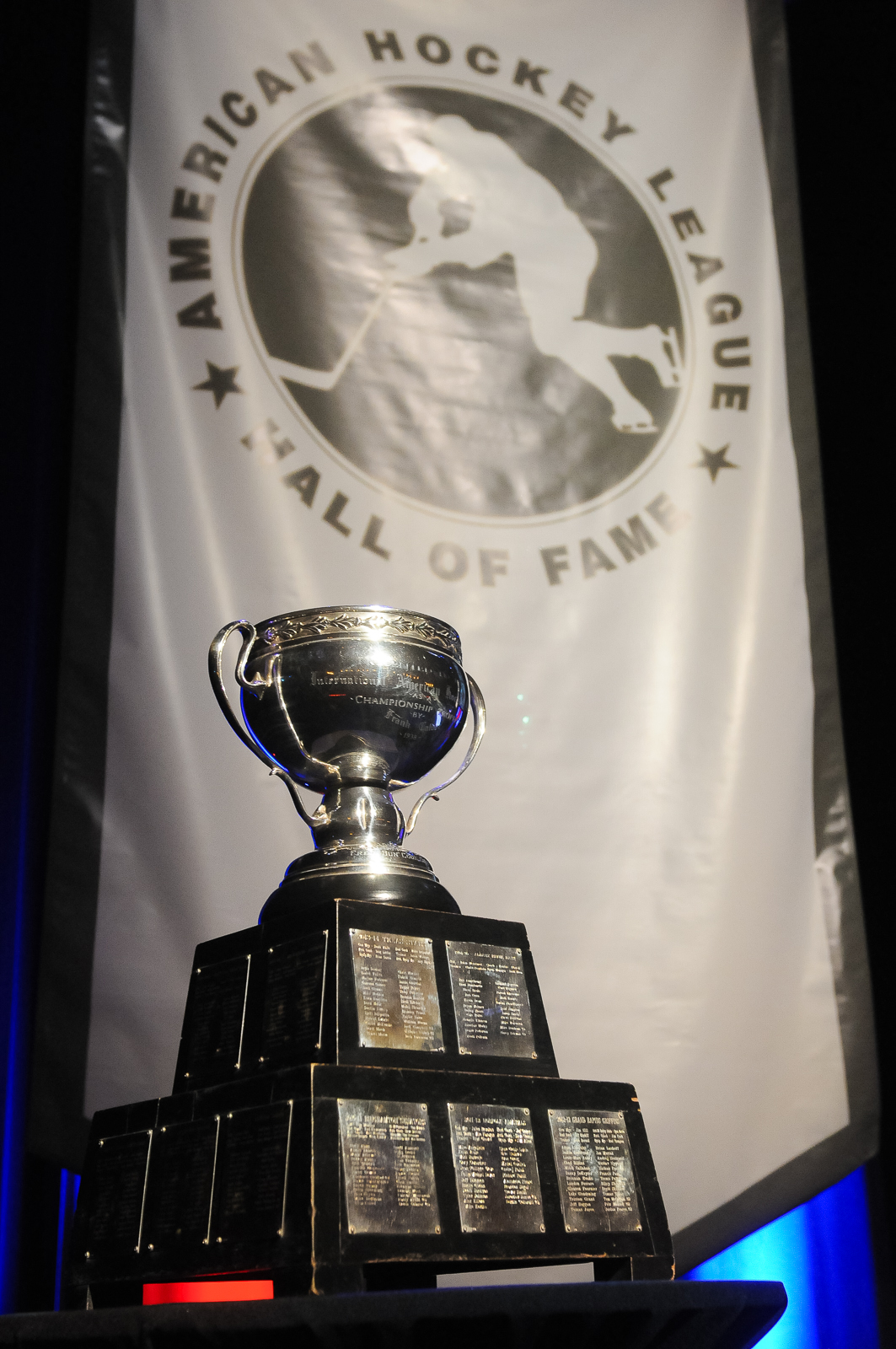
The Calder Cup

The Calder Cup is the trophy awarded annually to the playoff champion of the American Hockey League (AHL). First awarded in the 1937–38 season, it is named after Frank Calder, inaugural president of the National Hockey League (NHL). The Calder Cup is distinct from the Calder Memorial Trophy, which is awarded annually to the Rookie of the Year in the NHL.

Teams from 28 different cities have won the Calder Cup. The Hershey Bears have won 13 championships, the most of any team currently in the AHL, and have competed in 25 finals, and compiling a 13–12 record in their history. The defunct Cleveland Barons are second, with 9 total championships.

On May 11, 2020, the AHL cancelled the remainder of the 2019–20 AHL season and the 2020 Calder Cup playoffs due to the COVID-19 pandemic, marking the first time that a Calder Cup champion was not awarded in the trophy's history. It was likewise not awarded in 2021 as the league did not hold a playoff (even though the AHL did play a delayed and shortened regular season).

The Most Valuable Player of the playoffs is awarded the Jack A. Butterfield Trophy. It was first awarded in 1984 and is named after the former president of the AHL, Jack Butterfield. The trophy has been won by 40 different players, with none having won it more than once.

On June 23, 2025, the Abbotsford Canucks became the first franchise from the AHL's Pacific Division and the first Western Canadian team to win the Calder Cup.

== List of winners ==
Key

- (#)–Number of Calder Cups won at the time
- Player was a member of the defeated team in the Calder Cup Finals

Note: All Jack A. Butterfield Trophy winners played for the winning team, unless otherwise noted.

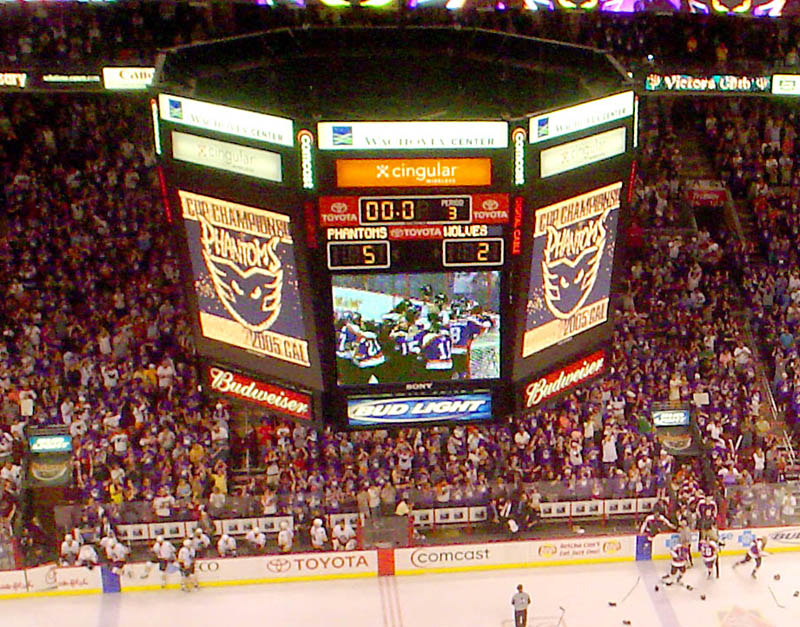
The Philadelphia Phantoms swept the Chicago Wolves to win the 2005 Calder Cup in front of a playoff record crowd of 20,103.

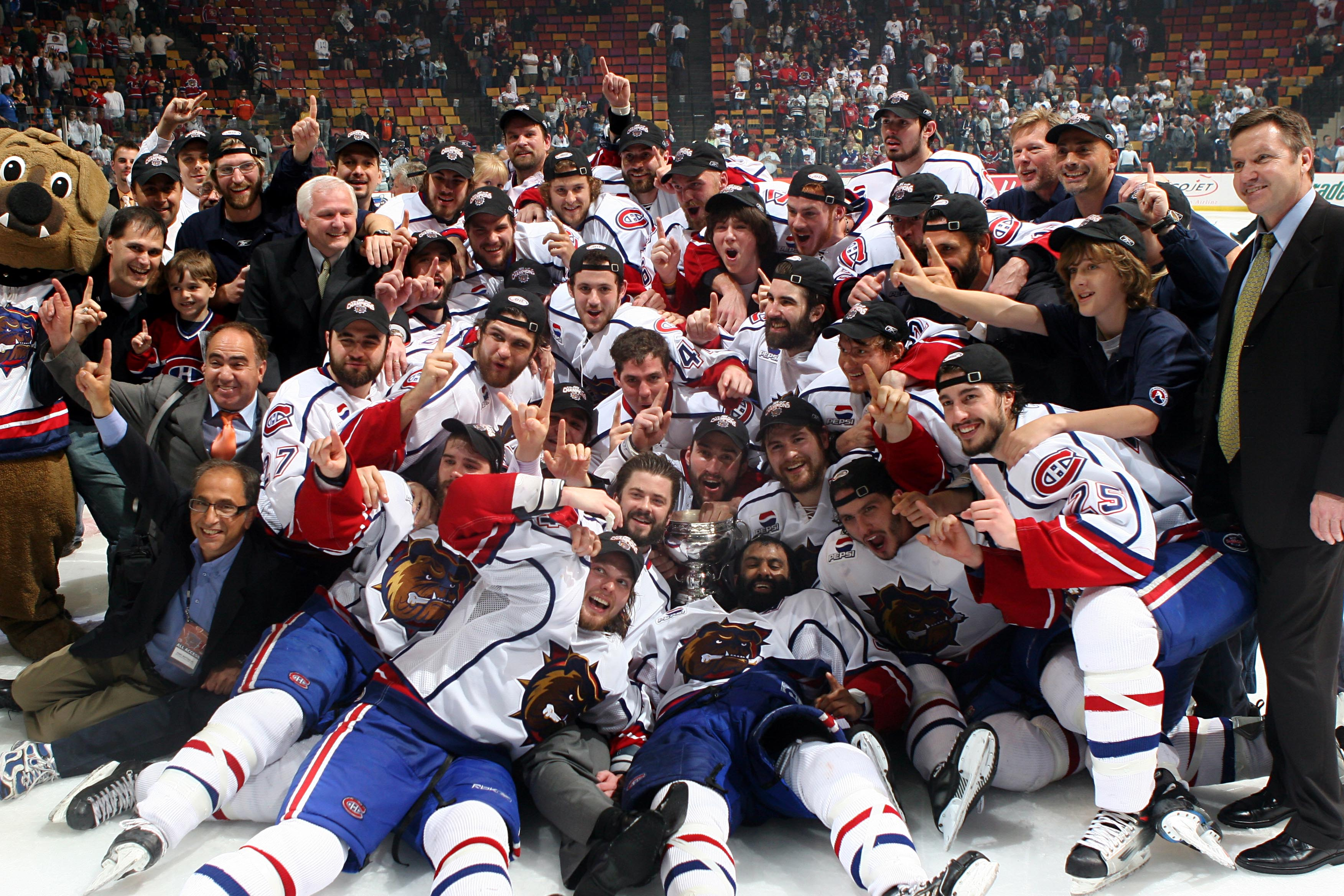
The Hamilton Bulldogs celebrate their Calder Cup win in 2007

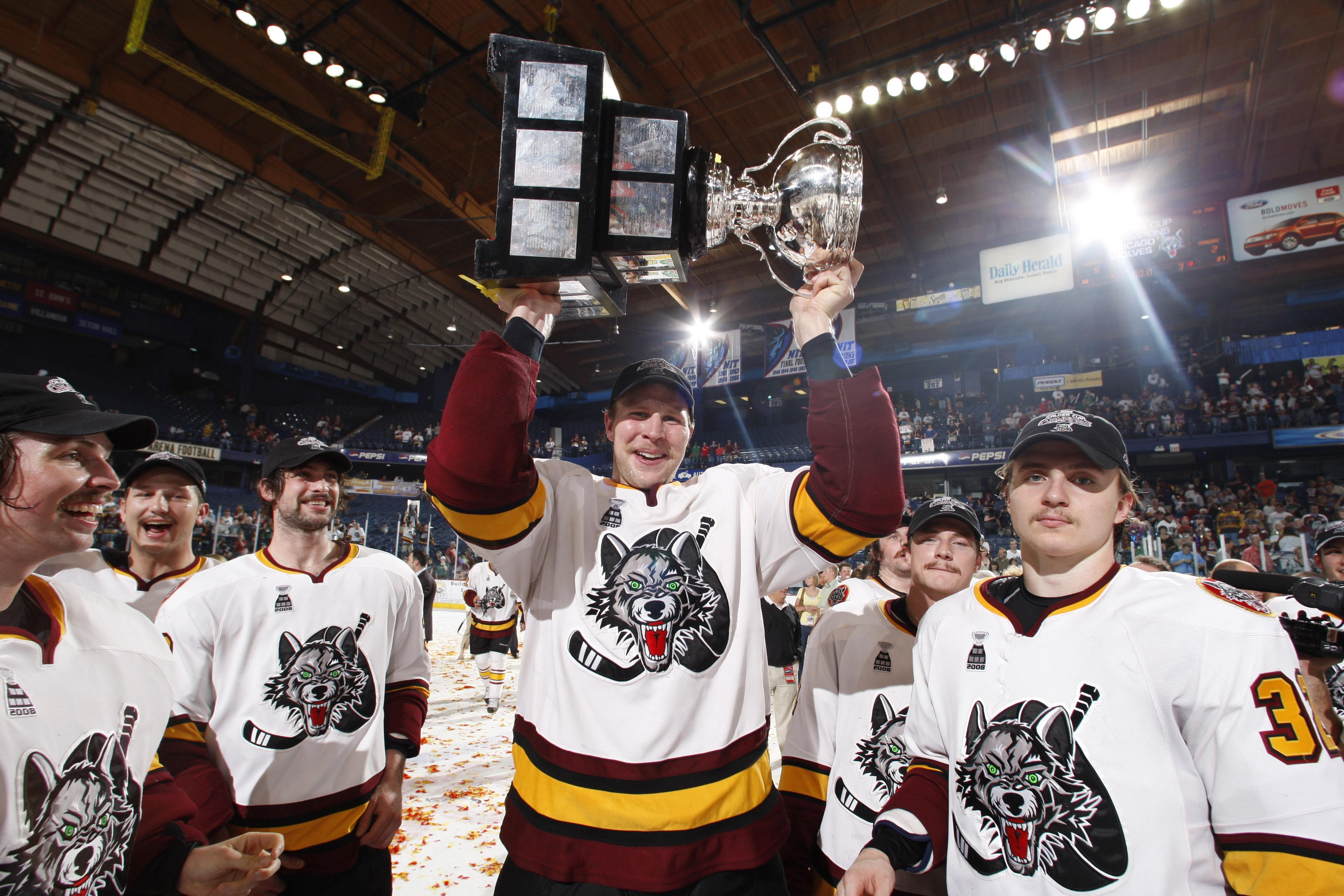
The Chicago Wolves celebrate winning the 2008 Calder Cup

Season	Winning team	Series	Losing team	Jack A. Butterfield Trophy	Winning head coach
1936–37	Syracuse Stars (1)	3–1	Philadelphia Ramblers	Not awarded	Eddie Powers
1937–38	Providence Reds (1)	3–1	Syracuse Stars	Not awarded	Fred (Bun) Cook
1938–39	Cleveland Barons (1)	3–1	Philadelphia Ramblers	Not awarded	Bill Cook
1939–40	Providence Reds (2)	3–0	Pittsburgh Hornets	Not awarded	Fred (Bun) Cook (2)
1940–41	Cleveland Barons (2)	3–2	Hershey Bears	Not awarded	Bill Cook (2)
1941–42	Indianapolis Capitals (1)	3–2	Hershey Bears	Not awarded	Herb Lewis
1942–43	Buffalo Bisons (1)	3–0	Indianapolis Capitals	Not awarded	Art Chapman
1943–44	Buffalo Bisons (2)	4–0	Cleveland Barons	Not awarded	Art Chapman (2)
1944–45	Cleveland Barons (3)	4–2	Hershey Bears	Not awarded	Fred (Bun) Cook (3)
1945–46	Buffalo Bisons (3)	4–3	Cleveland Barons	Not awarded	Frank Beisler
1946–47	Hershey Bears (1)	4–3	Pittsburgh Hornets	Not awarded	Don Penniston
1947–48	Cleveland Barons (4)	4–0	Buffalo Bisons	Not awarded	Fred (Bun) Cook (4)
1948–49	Providence Reds (3)	4–3	Hershey Bears	Not awarded	Terry Reardon
1949–50	Indianapolis Capitals (2)	4–0	Cleveland Barons	Not awarded	Ott Heller
1950–51	Cleveland Barons (5)	4–3	Pittsburgh Hornets	Not awarded	Fred (Bun) Cook (5)
1951–52	Pittsburgh Hornets (1)	4–2	Providence Reds	Not awarded	King Clancy
1952–53	Cleveland Barons (6)	4–3	Pittsburgh Hornets	Not awarded	Fred (Bun) Cook (6)
1953–54	Cleveland Barons (7)	4–2	Hershey Bears	Not awarded	Fred (Bun) Cook (7)
1954–55	Pittsburgh Hornets (2)	4–2	Buffalo Bisons	Not awarded	Howie Meeker
1955–56	Providence Reds (4)	4–0	Cleveland Barons	Not awarded	John Crawford
1956–57	Cleveland Barons (8)	4–1	Rochester Americans	Not awarded	Jack Gordon
1957–58	Hershey Bears (2)	4–2	Springfield Indians	Not awarded	Frank Mathers
1958–59	Hershey Bears (3)	4–2	Buffalo Bisons	Not awarded	Frank Mathers (2)
1959–60	Springfield Indians (1)	4–1	Rochester Americans	Not awarded	Pat Egan
1960–61	Springfield Indians (2)	4–0	Hershey Bears	Not awarded	Pat Egan (2)
1961–62	Springfield Indians (3)	4–1	Buffalo Bisons	Not awarded	Pat Egan (3)
1962–63	Buffalo Bisons (4)	4–3	Hershey Bears	Not awarded	Bill Reay
1963–64	Cleveland Barons (9)	4–0	Quebec Aces	Not awarded	Fred Glover
1964–65	Rochester Americans (1)	4–1	Hershey Bears	Not awarded	Joe Crozier
1965–66	Rochester Americans (2)	4–2	Cleveland Barons	Not awarded	Joe Crozier (2)
1966–67	Pittsburgh Hornets (1)^{[A]}	4–0	Rochester Americans	Not awarded	Baz Bastien
1967–68	Rochester Americans (3)	4–2	Quebec Aces	Not awarded	Joe Crozier (3)
1968–69	Hershey Bears (4)	4–1	Quebec Aces	Not awarded	Frank Mathers (3)
1969–70	Buffalo Bisons (5)	4–0	Springfield Kings	Not awarded	Fred Shero
1970–71	Springfield Kings (4)	4–0	Providence Reds	Not awarded	Johnny Wilson
1971–72	Nova Scotia Voyageurs (1)	4–2	Baltimore Clippers	Not awarded	Al MacNeil
1972–73	Cincinnati Swords (1)	4–1	Nova Scotia Voyageurs	Not awarded	Floyd Smith
1973–74	Hershey Bears (5)	4–1	Providence Reds	Not awarded	Chuck Hamilton
1974–75	Springfield Indians (5)	4–1	New Haven Nighthawks	Not awarded	Ron Stewart
1975–76	Nova Scotia Voyageurs (2)	4–1	Hershey Bears	Not awarded	Al MacNeil (2)
1976–77	Nova Scotia Voyageurs (3)	4–2	Rochester Americans	Not awarded	Al MacNeil (3)
1977–78	Maine Mariners (1)	4–1	New Haven Nighthawks	Not awarded	Bob McCammon
1978–79	Maine Mariners (2)	4–0	New Haven Nighthawks	Not awarded	Bob McCammon (2)
1979–80	Hershey Bears (6)	4–2	New Brunswick Hawks	Not awarded	Doug Gibson
1980–81	Adirondack Red Wings (1)	4–2	Maine Mariners	Not awarded	Tom Webster and J.P. LeBlanc (co-coaches)
1981–82	New Brunswick Hawks (1)	4–1	Binghamton Whalers	Not awarded	Orval Tessier
1982–83	Rochester Americans (4)	4–0	Maine Mariners	Not awarded	Mike Keenan
1983–84	Maine Mariners (3)	4–1	Rochester Americans	Bud Stefanski	John Paddock
1984–85	Sherbrooke Canadiens (1)	4–2	Baltimore Skipjacks	Brian Skrudland	Pierre Creamer
1985–86	Adirondack Red Wings (2)	4–2	Hershey Bears	Tim Tookey^{[B]}	Bill Dineen
1986–87	Rochester Americans (5)	4–3	Sherbrooke Canadiens	David Fenyves	John Van Boxmeer
1987–88	Hershey Bears (7)	4–0	Fredericton Express	Wendell Young	John Paddock (2)
1988–89	Adirondack Red Wings (3)	4–1	New Haven Nighthawks	Sam St. Laurent	Bill Dineen (2)
1989–90	Springfield Indians (6)	4–2	Rochester Americans	Jeff Hackett	Jim Roberts
1990–91	Springfield Indians (7)	4–2	Rochester Americans	Kay Whitmore	Jim Roberts (2)
1991–92	Adirondack Red Wings (4)	4–3	St. John's Maple Leafs	Allan Bester	Barry Melrose
1992–93	Cape Breton Oilers (1)	4–1	Rochester Americans	Bill McDougall	George Burnett
1993–94	Portland Pirates (1)	4–2	Moncton Hawks	Olaf Kölzig	Barry Trotz
1994–95	Albany River Rats (1)	4–0	Fredericton Canadiens	Corey Schwab & Mike Dunham	Robbie Ftorek
1995–96	Rochester Americans (6)	4–3	Portland Pirates	Dixon Ward	John Tortorella
1996–97	Hershey Bears (8)	4–1	Hamilton Bulldogs	Mike McHugh	Bob Hartley
1997–98	Philadelphia Phantoms (1)	4–2	Saint John Flames	Mike Maneluk	Bill Barber
1998–99	Providence Bruins (1)	4–1	Rochester Americans	Peter Ferraro	Peter Laviolette
1999–00	Hartford Wolf Pack (1)	4–2	Rochester Americans	Derek Armstrong	John Paddock (3)
2000–01	Saint John Flames (1)	4–2	Wilkes-Barre/Scranton Penguins	Steve Begin	Jim Playfair
2001–02	Chicago Wolves (1)	4–1	Bridgeport Sound Tigers	Pasi Nurminen	John Anderson
2002–03	Houston Aeros (1)	4–3	Hamilton Bulldogs	Johan Holmqvist	Todd McLellan
2003–04	Milwaukee Admirals (1)	4–0	Wilkes-Barre/Scranton Penguins	Wade Flaherty	Claude Noël
2004–05	Philadelphia Phantoms (2)	4–0	Chicago Wolves	Antero Niittymäki	John Stevens
2005–06	Hershey Bears (9)	4–2	Milwaukee Admirals	Frederic Cassivi	Bruce Boudreau
2006–07	Hamilton Bulldogs (1)	4–1	Hershey Bears	Carey Price	Don Lever
2007–08	Chicago Wolves (2)	4–2	Wilkes-Barre/Scranton Penguins	Jason Krog	John Anderson (2)
2008–09	Hershey Bears (10)	4–2	Manitoba Moose	Michal Neuvirth	Bob Woods
2009–10	Hershey Bears (11)	4–2	Texas Stars	Chris Bourque	Mark French
2010–11	Binghamton Senators (1)	4–2	Houston Aeros	Robin Lehner	Kurt Kleinendorst
2011–12	Norfolk Admirals (1)	4–0	Toronto Marlies	Alexandre Picard	Jon Cooper
2012–13	Grand Rapids Griffins (1)	4–2	Syracuse Crunch	Tomáš Tatar	Jeff Blashill
2013–14	Texas Stars (1)	4–1	St. John's IceCaps	Travis Morin	Willie Desjardins
2014–15	Manchester Monarchs (1)	4–1	Utica Comets	Jordan Weal	Mike Stothers
2015–16	Lake Erie Monsters (1)	4–0	Hershey Bears	Oliver Bjorkstrand	Jared Bednar
2016–17	Grand Rapids Griffins (2)	4–2	Syracuse Crunch	Tyler Bertuzzi	Todd Nelson
2017–18	Toronto Marlies (1)	4–3	Texas Stars	Andreas Johnsson	Sheldon Keefe
2018–19	Charlotte Checkers (1)	4–1	Chicago Wolves	Andrew Poturalski	Mike Vellucci
2019–20	No Calder Cup playoffs due to the COVID-19 pandemic				
2020–21	No Calder Cup playoffs due to the COVID-19 pandemic				
2021–22	Chicago Wolves (3)	4–1	Springfield Thunderbirds	Josh Leivo	Ryan Warsofsky
2022–23	Hershey Bears (12)	4–3	Coachella Valley Firebirds	Hunter Shepard	Todd Nelson (2)
2023–24	Hershey Bears (13)	4–2	Coachella Valley Firebirds	Hendrix Lapierre	Todd Nelson (3)
2024–25	Abbotsford Canucks (1)	4–2	Charlotte Checkers	Artūrs Šilovs	Manny Malhotra
2025–26	Toronto Marlies (2)	4–1	Chicago Wolves	Artur Akhtyamov	John Gruden

A. Calder Cup won by second franchise known as the Pittsburgh Hornets. Previous franchise became the Rochester Americans.
B. Tim Tookey, Butterfield Trophy winner in 1985–86, played for the Hershey Bears, and is the only Butterfield Trophy winner to date to have played for a losing team in the Calder Cup finals.

== Calder Cup wins by team ==
Bold denotes an active AHL team

Team	Championships	Runner up	PCT.
**Hershey Bears**	13	12	.520
Cleveland Barons	9	5	.643
Springfield Indians/Kings	7	2	.778
**Rochester Americans**	6	10	.375
Buffalo Bisons	5	4	.556
Adirondack Red Wings	4	0	1.000
Providence Reds	4	3	.571
Nova Scotia Voyageurs	3	1	.750
Maine Mariners	3	2	.600
**Chicago Wolves**	3	3	.500
Pittsburgh Hornets	3	4	.429
**Grand Rapids Griffins**	2	0	1.000
Philadelphia Phantoms	2	0	1.000
Indianapolis Capitals	2	1	.667
**Toronto Marlies**	2	1	.667
**Abbotsford Canucks**	1	0	1.000
Albany River Rats	1	0	1.000
Binghamton Senators	1	0	1.000
Cape Breton Oilers	1	0	1.000
Cincinnati Swords	1	0	1.000
**Cleveland Monsters**	1	0	1.000
**Hartford Wolf Pack**	1	0	1.000
**Manchester Monarchs (Ontario Reign)**	1	0	1.000
Norfolk Admirals	1	0	1.000
**Providence Bruins**	1	0	1.000
**Charlotte Checkers**	1	1	.500
**Milwaukee Admirals**	1	1	.500
Hamilton Bulldogs	1	1	.500
Houston Aeros	1	1	.500
New Brunswick Hawks	1	1	.500
Portland Pirates	1	1	.500
Saint John Flames	1	1	.500
Sherbrooke Canadiens	1	1	.500
Syracuse Stars	1	1	.500
**Texas Stars**	1	2	.333
Baltimore Clippers	0	1	.000
Binghamton Whalers	0	1	.000
Bridgeport Islanders (Sound Tigers)	0	1	.000
Fredericton Canadiens	0	1	.000
Fredericton Express	0	1	.000
**Manitoba Moose**	0	1	.000
**Springfield Thunderbirds**	0	1	.000
**Utica Comets**	0	1	.000
**Coachella Valley Firebirds**	0	2	.000
Philadelphia Ramblers	0	2	.000
**Syracuse Crunch**	0	2	.000
Quebec Aces	0	3	.000
**Wilkes-Barre/Scranton Penguins**	0	3	.000
New Haven Nighthawks	0	4	.000
