= 1985 Calder Cup playoffs =

American Hockey League postseason

Tournament details
- Dates: April 10 – May 24, 1985
- Teams: 8

Final positions
- Champions: Sherbrooke Canadiens
- Runners-up: Baltimore Skipjacks

The 1985 Calder Cup playoffs of the American Hockey League began on April 10, 1985. The eight teams that qualified, four from each division, played best-of-seven series for Division Semifinals and Division Finals. The division champions played a best-of-seven series for the Calder Cup. The Calder Cup Final ended on May 24, 1985, with the Sherbrooke Canadiens defeating the Baltimore Skipjacks four games to two to win the Calder Cup for the only time in team history. Sherbrooke's Brian Skrudland won the Jack A. Butterfield Trophy as AHL playoff MVP.

The Maine Mariners set an AHL playoff record during the Northern division final against Sherbrooke by scoring three goals 23 seconds apart. Maine scored at 19:29, 19:42, and 19:52 of the second period in the game, thereby setting a new AHL playoff record for the three fastest goals scored.

== Playoff seeds ==
After the 1984–85 AHL regular season, the top four teams from each division qualified for the playoffs. The Binghamton Whalers finished the regular season with the best overall record.

=== Northern Division ===
1. Maine Mariners - 86 points
2. Fredericton Express - 80 points
3. Sherbrooke Canadiens - 79 points
4. Nova Scotia Oilers - 79 points

=== Southern Division ===
1. Binghamton Whalers - 112 points
2. Baltimore Skipjacks - 98 points
3. Rochester Americans - 93 points
4. Springfield Indians - 76 points

== Bracket ==
Division Semifinals
1 | Maine | 4
4 | Nova Scotia | 2
North Division
2 | Fredericton | 2
3 | Sherbrooke | 4
1 | Binghamton | 4
4 | Springfield | 0
South Division
2 | Baltimore | 4
3 | Rochester | 1

Division Finals
1 | Maine | 1
3 | Sherbrooke | 4
1 | Binghamton | 0
2 | Baltimore | 4

Calder Cup Final
N3 | Sherbrooke | 4
S2 | Baltimore | 2

In each round, the team that earned more points during the regular season receives home ice advantage, meaning they receive the "extra" game on home-ice if the series reaches the maximum number of games. There is no set series format due to arena scheduling conflicts and travel considerations.

== Division Semifinals ==
Note: Home team is listed first.

=== Northern Division ===
==== (1) Maine Mariners vs. (4) Nova Scotia Oilers ====
| April 11 | Maine Mariners | 3 - 4 | 4OT | Nova Scotia Oilers |

| April 14 | Maine Mariners | 5 - 3 | Nova Scotia Oilers |

| April 17 | Nova Scotia Oilers | 5 - 6 | OT | Maine Mariners |

| April 19 | Nova Scotia Oilers | 4 - 3 | Maine Mariners |

| April 20 | Maine Mariners | 5 - 4 | Nova Scotia Oilers |

| April 22 | Nova Scotia Oilers | 3 - 4 | Maine Mariners |

| Maine won series 4 – 2 |

==== (2) Fredericton Express vs. (3) Sherbrooke Canadiens ====
| April 11 | Fredericton Express | 2 - 5 | Sherbrooke Canadiens |

| April 12 | Fredericton Express | 2 - 3 | Sherbrooke Canadiens |

| April 15 | Sherbrooke Canadiens | 2 - 6 | Fredericton Express |

| April 17 | Sherbrooke Canadiens | 5 - 4 | Fredericton Express |

| April 20 | Fredericton Express | 3 - 1 | Sherbrooke Canadiens |

| April 22 | Sherbrooke Canadiens | 4 - 3 | OT | Fredericton Express |

| Sherbrooke won series 4 - 2 |

=== Southern Division ===
==== (1) Binghamton Whalers vs. (4) Springfield Indians ====
| April 10 | Binghamton Whalers | 4 - 2 | Springfield Indians |

| April 12 | Binghamton Whalers | 9 - 5 | Springfield Indians |

| April 13 | Springfield Indians | 1 - 6 | Binghamton Whalers |

| April 16 | Springfield Indians | 5 - 7 | Binghamton Whalers |

| Binghamton won series 4 - 0 |

==== (2) Baltimore Skipjacks vs. (3) Rochester Americans ====
| April 11 | Baltimore Skipjacks | 2 - 3 | OT | Rochester Americans |

| April 13 | Baltimore Skipjacks | 6 - 5 | Rochester Americans |

| April 14 | Rochester Americans | 5 - 8 | Baltimore Skipjacks |

| April 17 | Rochester Americans | 5 - 6 | 2OT | Baltimore Skipjacks |

| April 20 | Baltimore Skipjacks | 6 - 1 | Rochester Americans |

| Baltimore won series 4 - 1 |

== Division Finals ==
=== Northern Division ===
==== (1) Maine Mariners vs. (3) Sherbrooke Canadiens ====
| May 1 | Maine Mariners | 5 - 2 | Sherbrooke Canadiens |

| May 3 | Sherbrooke Canadiens | 9 - 2 | Maine Mariners |

| May 4 | Maine Mariners | 3 - 7 | Sherbrooke Canadiens |

| May 6 | Sherbrooke Canadiens | 7 - 2 | Maine Mariners |

| May 8 | Maine Mariners | 5 - 6 | 2OT | Sherbrooke Canadiens |

| Sherbrooke won series 4 - 1 |

=== Southern Division ===
==== (1) Binghamton Whalers vs. (2) Baltimore Skipjacks ====
| April 25 | Binghamton Whalers | 2 - 5 | Baltimore Skipjacks |

| April 28 | Baltimore Skipjacks | 2 - 1 | OT | Binghamton Whalers |

| May 1 | Binghamton Whalers | 3 - 6 | Baltimore Skipjacks |

| May 4 | Baltimore Skipjacks | 6 - 1 | Binghamton Whalers |

| Baltimore won series 4 - 0 |

== Calder Cup Final ==
=== (S2) Baltimore Skipjacks vs.(N3) Sherbrooke Canadiens ===
| May 11 | Baltimore Skipjacks | 3 - 4 | Sherbrooke Canadiens |

| May 15 | Baltimore Skipjacks | 3 - 4 | Sherbrooke Canadiens |

| May 17 | Sherbrooke Canadiens | 3 - 5 | Baltimore Skipjacks |

| May 19 | Sherbrooke Canadiens | 6 - 1 | Baltimore Skipjacks |

| May 22 | Baltimore Skipjacks | 6 - 2 | Sherbrooke Canadiens |

| May 24 | Sherbrooke Canadiens | 3 - 1 | Baltimore Skipjacks |

| Sherbrooke won series 4 - 2 |

== See also ==
- 1984–85 AHL season
- List of AHL seasons

| Preceded by 1984 Calder Cup playoffs | Calder Cup playoffs 1985 | Succeeded by 1986 Calder Cup playoffs |
