= Mike Moller =

Canadian ice hockey player

- Born: June 16, 1962 (age 63) Calgary, Alberta, Canada
- Height: 6 ft 0 in (183 cm)
- Weight: 194 lb (88 kg; 13 st 12 lb)
- Position: Right wing
- Shot: Right
- Played for: Buffalo Sabres; Edmonton Oilers
- NHL draft: 41st overall, 1980; Buffalo Sabres
- Playing career: 1981–1990

Michael John Moller (born June 16, 1962) is a Canadian former professional ice hockey right wing. He was drafted in the second round, 41st overall, by the Buffalo Sabres in the 1980 NHL entry draft. He played in the National Hockey League with the Sabres and Edmonton Oilers. Mike is the brother of Randy Moller.

As a player for the 1981–82 Canadian National Junior Team, he scored the gold medal winning goal against the Czech Republic in the final game; his sweater now hangs in the International Hockey Hall of Fame in Toronto.

In his NHL career, Moller appeared in 134 games. He scored fifteen goals and added twenty-eight assists.

== Career statistics ==
=== Regular season and playoffs ===
			Regular season					Playoffs
Season	Team	League	GP	G	A	Pts	PIM	GP	G	A	Pts	PIM
1978–79	Red Deer Chiefs AAA	AMHL	—	—	—	—	—	—	—	—	—	—
1979–80	Lethbridge Broncos	WHL	72	30	41	71	55	4	0	6	6	0
1980–81	Lethbridge Broncos	WHL	70	39	69	108	71	9	6	10	16	2
1980–81	Buffalo Sabres	NHL	5	2	2	4	0	3	0	1	1	0
1981–82	Buffalo Sabres	NHL	9	0	0	0	0	—	—	—	—	—
1981–82	Lethbridge Broncos	WHL	49	41	81	122	38	12	5	12	17	9
1982–83	Buffalo Sabres	NHL	49	6	12	18	14	—	—	—	—	—
1982–83	Rochester Americans	AHL	10	1	6	7	2	11	2	4	6	4
1983–84	Buffalo Sabres	NHL	59	5	11	16	27	—	—	—	—	—
1984–85	Buffalo Sabres	NHL	5	0	2	2	0	—	—	—	—	—
1984–85	Rochester Americans	AHL	73	19	46	65	27	5	1	1	2	0
1985–86	Edmonton Oilers	NHL	1	0	0	0	0	—	—	—	—	—
1985–86	Nova Scotia Oilers	AHL	62	16	15	31	24	—	—	—	—	—
1986–87	Edmonton Oilers	NHL	6	2	1	3	0	—	—	—	—	—
1986–87	Nova Scotia Oilers	AHL	70	14	33	47	28	1	0	0	0	0
1987–88	Nova Scotia Oilers	AHL	60	12	31	43	14	5	3	0	3	0
1988–89	Canadian National Team	Intl	58	18	16	34	18	—	—	—	—	—
1989–90	Binghamton Whalers	AHL	12	1	2	3	6	—	—	—	—	—
AHL totals			287	63	133	196	101	22	6	5	11	4
NHL totals			134	15	28	43	41	3	0	1	1	0

=== International ===
Year	Team	Event	GP	G	A	Pts	PIM
1982	Canada	WJC	7	5	9	14	4

== Awards ==
- WHL First All-Star Team – 1981 & 1982
