= Jody Gage =

Canadian ice hockey player (born 1959)

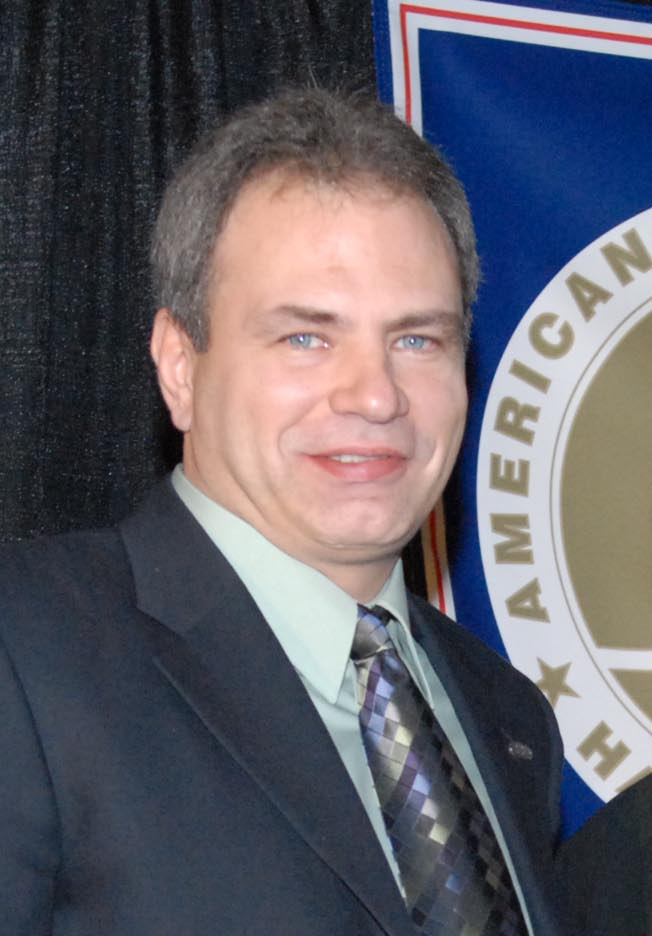
- Born: November 29, 1959 (age 66) Toronto, Ontario, Canada
- Height: 6 ft 0 in (183 cm)
- Weight: 202 lb (92 kg; 14 st 6 lb)
- Position: Right wing
- Shot: Right
- Played for: Detroit Red Wings; Buffalo Sabres; Rochester Americans
- NHL draft: 45th overall, 1979; Detroit Red Wings
- Playing career: 1979–1996

Joseph William "Jody" Gage (born November 29, 1959) is a Canadian former professional ice hockey right winger. He was drafted in the third round, 45th overall, by the Detroit Red Wings in the 1979 NHL entry draft. In ten seasons, Gage became the Rochester Americans' all-time leader in games played (653), points (728), goals (351), and assists (377). Gage won the Les Cunningham Award in 1987–88 after a 60-goal season (second player in league history to accomplish this feat). He was the third player in AHL history to score 1000 points, the fifth player to play 1000 AHL games, and the fifth member of the AHL's 500-goal club. Gage led Rochester to a Calder Cup in 1986–87 and back to the Calder Cup Finals in 1989–90, 1990–91, and 1992–93.

The man dubbed "Mr. Amerk" retired during the 1995–96 season and finished his AHL career with 504 goals, 1,048 points, seven 40-goal seasons, and 51 playoff goals. In 68 career NHL games with Detroit and Buffalo, Gage totaled 14 goals, 15 assists, and 26 penalty minutes. Immediately after his retirement, Gage accepted a position as assistant general manager and helped the Amerks capture the 1995–96 Calder Cup championship over the defending champion Portland Pirates.

== Early life ==
Gage was born on November 29, 1959, in Toronto, Ontario, Canada. He is one of four children, and his father John worked two jobs to support the family. Growing up in North York, Gage originally played as a goaltender before switching to a forward position.

== Career ==
As a youth, Gage played in the 1972 Quebec International Pee-Wee Hockey Tournament with a minor ice hockey team from Toronto. Gage played for the Toronto Young Nationsis midget team before being drafted by the St. Catharines Fincups in the Ontario Major Junior Hockey League (OMJHL). A team scout had originally attended the game to watch another player but was encouraged by Gage's father to watch him as well. Gage was drafted in the fifth round of the 1976 OMJHL draft, but was described by Fincups head coach as being "probably the best fifth-rounder in the history of the league." However, shortly after joining the Fincups for the 1976–77 season, Gage suffered a knee injury and missed over a month of game play. In his return on December 7, Gage scored a goal and two assists against the Kitchener Rangers. He played for the Fincups in St. Catharine's and Hamilton before being traded to the Rangers during the 1977–78 season.

=== Professional ===
==== Detroit Red Wings organization (1979–1985) ====
Gage began his professional league career in the 1979–80 season, splitting time with the Kalamazoo Wings of the International Hockey League (IHL) and the Adirondack Red Wings of the American Hockey League (AHL). Gage made his AHL debut on October 11, 1979, in the Red Wings' season opener against the Hershey Bears. He scored four goals in his debut to lift the Red Wings to an 8–3 win. He scored six points in 10 games before being demoted to Kalamazoo due to an overabundance of players. He found immediate success on a line with Tommy Ross and Tom Milani and scored 16 goals in 12 games. On December 5, 1979, Gage tied a franchise record with the Kalamazoo Red Wings by scoring four goals in a single game. He became the fifth player in franchise history to reach this milestone and the second to do so in the regular season. Gage accumulated 17 goals in 14 games before being recalled to the AHL for the remainder of the season.

As a result of his play with the Adirondack Red Wings, Gage was invited to the Detroit Red Wings' 1980 training camp and made their opening night roster. He made his NHL debut on October 10, 1980, against the Vancouver Canucks and registered his first NHL assist that night. Gage scored his first career NHL goal later that month on October 16 against the New York Islanders. He recorded two goals and two assists through 16 games before being demoted back to the AHL. While with the Adirondack Red Wings, Gage skated on a line with Joe Paterson and Wayne Crawford and scored 17 goals through 59 games.

In September 1981, Gage signed a contract extension to remain with the Red Wings organization. He rejoined the Adirondack Red Wings for the 1981–82 season but the team struggled to win games. By mid-October, Gage led the team in scoring with five points, but the Red Wings held a 1–5 losing record. Gage was reunited with Crawford and Paterson but the Red Wings struggles continued through the first half of the season. In early December, the team nearly set a franchise record for most consecutive losses. Gage was recalled to the NHL level on January 22, 1982. He scored three goals through his first six games with Detroit. On March 27, Gage scored his eighth goal of the season to help the Red Wings end their franchise-record 14-game losing streak.

Gage returned to the Adirondack Red Wings for the 1983–84 season and led the team in preseason scoring. He scored eight goals and nine assists for the Red Wings before being recalled to the NHL on November 7. Gage played in three out of eight games in Detroit as a fill in for an injured player before being returned to the AHL. While playing alongside Ted Nolan and Derek Smith, Gage set a record for most goals by an Adirondack Red Wings player in a single season. He also continued to maintain the franchise record for games played, goals, assists, and points. Gage finished the regular season as Adirondack's second-leading scorer with 27 goals and 33 assists through 78 games.

==== Buffalo Sabres organization (1985–1996) ====
In July 1985, Gage signed with the Buffalo Sabres as a free agent after Detroit's general manager said he was too good for the AHL but not good enough for the NHL. Gage attended the Sabres' training camp but was not guaranteed a spot on their opening night roster. He was subsequently assigned to their AHL affiliate team, the Rochester Americans, to begin the 1985–86 season. Gage scored four goals in his Amerks debut on October 18 against the Hershey Bears to lead the team to a 7–4 win. Gage continued to score throughout October and was named AHL Player of the Week on October 28 after scoring six goals and five assists in four games. He finished the regular season second on the team in scoring with 99 points and was named to the AHL First All-Star Team. As a free agent, he signed a contract extension to remain with the Sabres organization.

Gage experienced a significant dip in scoring upon returning to the Rochester Americans for the 1986–87 season. As Gage's former linemate Paul Gardner left during the offseason, Gage played on a line with rookie Benoît Hogue. Although Gage played alongside Hogue and Doug Trapp through the preseason, the pair were split up during the first few months of the regular season due to injuries and an inconsistent lineup. In the Americans' season opener, Gage received a game misconduct for being the third player in an altercation. His struggles continued throughout October, and he was limited to one goal and five assists through nine games. At the end of the month, Gage suffered a shoulder injury during a team scrimmage and was expected to miss up to two weeks to recover. Gage returned to the Amerks lineup on November 12, but suffered another injury a few weeks later. In an effort to improve Gage's offence, head coach John Van Boxmeer reunited him with Trapp and Hogue. In their first game back together on December 10, Gage scored two goals and the line combined for two more. Gage continued to score throughout January and finished with four goals and 10 assists through 13 games. By March, Gage had surpassed Trapp and Gaetano Orlando to become the team's leading scorer. He finished the regular season with 26 goals and 39 assists for a team-leading 65 points. During the 1987 Calder Cup playoffs, Gage scored 14 goals and 19 points to help the Amerks win the 1987 Calder Cup. His 14 goals tied the league record set in 1983 by Sean McKenna.

Gage returned to the Americans following their Calder Cup win for the 1987–88 season, but was beginning to contemplate retirement. He began the season playing alongside Keith Gretzky and Jay Fraser after they proved to be a successful line during the preseason. Gage went goalless through the Americans' first four games of the season before scoring twice in their win over the Utica Devils on October 21. He scored seven goals by the end of the month to help lead the team through a five-game win streak. Gage reached the 500-point milestone of his AHL career on November 8, 1987. By December, he led the team in scoring with 39 points through 28 games. In March, Gage surpassed Bronco Horvath for 16th place on the AHL's all-time list for total career goals and tied with Mal Davis for most goals in a season by an Amerk. By the end of the month, Gage had also played in his 600th AHL game and was named AHL Player of the Week. He earned this honour after scoring his 56th goal, the third-highest goal total in a season in AHL history. Gage scored his 60th goal of the season in the Amerks' final game to finish second as the AHL's all-time single-season scorer. His 60 goals and 104 points earned him the Les Cunningham Award as the AHL's MVP and First-Team AHL All-Star. In the 1988 Calder Cup playoffs, Gage scored two goals and five assists through the Americans first five games against the Adirondack Red Wings. However, he suffered a kidney injury in Game 5 as a result of Dennis Smith swinging his stick into him and was unable to return for the final game.

Following his 60-goal season, Gage signed a contract extension to remain with the Sabres. While the contract's financial terms were not released, it was rumoured that Gage was the highest-paid AHL player, making $50,000. However, he experienced a significant drop in scoring through the 1988–89 season and finished with 69 points through 65 games. On March 25, 1989, Gage set an AHL record by scoring two shorthanded goals within eight seconds of each other against the Binghamton Rangers.

Gage set numerous franchise and league records in January and February 1991. Over three weeks, he became the seventh all-time leading scorer in AHL history and second in franchise history. He also moved into fourth place on the franchise's all-time points list. On February 17, Gage played in his 800th career AHL game. Gage finished the regular season with 42 goals and 43 assists through 73 games as the Americans qualified for the 1991 Calder Cup playoffs.

On February 21, 1992, Gage became the franchise's all-time leading scorer with his 566th point. He set this record after tallying his 289th AHL assist against the Binghamton Rangers.

On November 22, 1992, Gage played in his 900th career AHL game. On December 5, 1992, Gage scored his 301st goal as an Amerks to become the franchise's all-time goal scoring leader.

On November 12, 1993, Gage scored a goal and an assist against the Binghamton Rangers to become the third player in AHL history to reach 1,000 points.

On November 25, 1994, Gage became the fifth player in AHL history to play 1,000 games in the league. The stick he used in this game was put on display at the Hockey Hall of Fame.

In 2006, Gage was elected an inaugural member of the American Hockey League Hall of Fame.

== Post-retirement ==
Gage was named general manager of the Americans before the 1996–97 season and has since overseen five division titles, two more trips to the Calder Cup Finals, and a Macgregor Kilpatrick Trophy after a 51-win season in 2004–05. In addition to his work with the Amerks, Gage also served as GM for the Rochester Rattlers of Major League Lacrosse and was GM of the National Lacrosse League's Rochester Knighthawks until new ownership took control of both the Amerks and Knighthawks in 2008.

On February 3, 2011, Gage was named the new general manager for the Hamilton Nationals of Major League Lacrosse.

Gage is now the vice president of player personnel for the Rochester Knighthawks Lacrosse Club.

== Personal life ==
Gage and his wife Charlotte have two children together.

== Career statistics ==
			Regular season					Playoffs
Season	Team	League	GP	G	A	Pts	PIM	GP	G	A	Pts	PIM
1975–76	Toronto Nationals	OPJHL	53	28	52	80	145	—	—	—	—	—
1976–77	St. Catharines Fincups	OMJHL	47	13	20	33	2	2	0	0	0	0
1977–78	Hamilton Fincups	OMJHL	32	15	18	33	19	—	—	—	—	—
1977–78	Kitchener Rangers	OMJHL	36	17	27	44	21	9	4	3	7	4
1978–79	Kitchener Rangers	OMJHL	58	46	43	89	40	10	1	2	3	6
1979–80	Adirondack Red Wings	AHL	63	25	21	46	15	5	2	1	3	0
1979–80	Kalamazoo Wings	IHL	14	17	12	29	0	—	—	—	—	—
1980–81	Detroit Red Wings	NHL	16	2	2	4	22	—	—	—	—	—
1980–81	Adirondack Red Wings	AHL	59	17	31	48	44	17	9	6	15	12
1981–82	Detroit Red Wings	NHL	31	9	10	19	2	—	—	—	—	—
1981–82	Adirondack Red Wings	AHL	47	21	20	41	21	—	—	—	—	—
1982–83	Adirondack Red Wings	AHL	65	23	30	53	33	6	1	5	6	8
1983–84	Detroit Red Wings	NHL	3	0	0	0	0	—	—	—	—	—
1983–84	Adirondack Red Wings	AHL	73	40	32	72	32	6	3	4	7	2
1984–85	Adirondack Red Wings	AHL	78	27	33	60	55	—	—	—	—	—
1985–86	Buffalo Sabres	NHL	7	3	2	5	0	—	—	—	—	—
1985–86	Rochester Americans	AHL	73	42	57	99	56	—	—	—	—	—
1986–87	Rochester Americans	AHL	70	26	39	65	60	17	14	5	19	24
1987–88	Buffalo Sabres	NHL	2	0	0	0	0	—	—	—	—	—
1987–88	Rochester Americans	AHL	76	60	44	104	46	5	2	5	7	10
1988–89	Rochester Americans	AHL	65	31	38	69	60	—	—	—	—	—
1989–90	Rochester Americans	AHL	75	45	38	83	42	17	4	6	10	12
1990–91	Rochester Americans	AHL	73	42	43	85	34	15	6	10	16	14
1991–92	Buffalo Sabres	NHL	9	0	1	1	2	—	—	—	—	—
1991–92	Rochester Americans	AHL	67	40	40	80	54	16	5	9	14	10
1992–93	Rochester Americans	AHL	71	40	40	80	76	9	5	8	13	2
1993–94	Rochester Americans	AHL	44	18	21	39	57	—	—	—	—	—
1994–95	Rochester Americans	AHL	23	4	5	9	20	2	0	0	0	0
1995–96	Rochester Americans	AHL	16	3	12	15	20	—	—	—	—	—
AHL totals			1038	504	544	1048	725	115	51	59	110	94
NHL totals			68	14	15	29	26	—	—	—	—	—
