= 1983 Calder Cup playoffs =

North American ice hockey tournament

Tournament details
- Dates: April 5 – May 19, 1983
- Teams: 8

Final positions
- Champions: Rochester Americans
- Runner-up: Maine Mariners

The 1983 Calder Cup playoffs of the American Hockey League began on April 5, 1983. The eight teams that qualified, four from each division, played best-of-seven series for Division Semifinals and Division Finals. The division champions played a best-of-seven series for the Calder Cup. The Calder Cup Final ended on May 19, 1983, with the Rochester Americans defeating the Maine Mariners four games to zero to win the Calder Cup for the fourth time in team history.

== Playoff seeds ==
After the 1982–83 AHL regular season, the top four teams from each division qualified for the playoffs. The Rochester Americans finished the regular season with the best overall record.

=== Northern Division ===
1. Fredericton Express - 98 points
2. Nova Scotia Voyageurs - 87 points
3. Maine Mariners - 86 points
4. Adirondack Red Wings - 77 points

=== Southern Division ===
1. Rochester Americans - 101 points
2. Hershey Bears - 85 points
3. New Haven Nighthawks - 84 points
4. Binghamton Whalers - 80 points

== Bracket ==
Division Semifinals
1	Fredericton	4
4	Adirondack	2
Northern Division
2	Nova Scotia	3
3	Maine	4
1	Rochester	4
4	Binghamton	1
Southern Division
2	Hershey	1
3	New Haven	4

Division Finals
1	Fredericton	2
3	Maine	4
1	Rochester	4
3	New Haven	3

Calder Cup Final
N3	Maine	0
S1	Rochester	4

In each round, the team that earned more points during the regular season receives home ice advantage, meaning they receive the "extra" game on home-ice if the series reaches the maximum number of games. There is no set series format due to arena scheduling conflicts and travel considerations.

== Division Semifinals ==
Note: Home team is listed first.

=== Northern Division ===
==== (1) Fredericton Express vs. (4) Adirondack Red Wings ====
April 6	Fredericton Express	4 - 2	Adirondack Red Wings

April 9	Fredericton Express	4 - 3	Adirondack Red Wings

April 12	Adirondack Red Wings	6 - 1	Fredericton Express

April 14	Adirondack Red Wings	2 - 4	Fredericton Express

April 16	Adirondack Red Wings	5 - 4	2OT	Fredericton Express

April 19	Fredericton Express	6 - 5	3OT	Adirondack Red Wings

Fredericton won series 4 – 2

==== (2) Nova Scotia Voyageurs vs. (3) Maine Mariners ====
April 8	Nova Scotia Voyageurs	5 - 3	Maine Mariners

April 10	Nova Scotia Voyageurs	1 - 3	Maine Mariners

April 14	Maine Mariners	3 - 1	Nova Scotia Voyageurs

April 15	Maine Mariners	2 - 3	Nova Scotia Voyageurs

April 17	Maine Mariners	2 - 5	Nova Scotia Voyageurs

April 19	Nova Scotia Voyageurs	4 - 5	Maine Mariners

April 21	Nova Scotia Voyageurs	1 - 4	Maine Mariners

Maine won series 4 - 3

=== Southern Division ===
==== (1) Rochester Americans vs. (4) Binghamton Whalers ====
April 5	Rochester Americans	5 - 6	Binghamton Whalers

April 7	Binghamton Whalers	3 - 5	Rochester Americans

April 10	Rochester Americans	7 - 5	Binghamton Whalers

April 13	Binghamton Whalers	3 - 4	OT	Rochester Americans

April 14	Rochester Americans	5 - 2	Binghamton Whalers

Rochester won series 4 - 1

==== (2) Hershey Bears vs. (3) New Haven Nighthawks ====
April 6	Hershey Bears	1 - 2	New Haven Nighthawks

April 9	Hershey Bears	6 - 2	New Haven Nighthawks

April 12	New Haven Nighthawks	4 - 3	Hershey Bears

April 13	New Haven Nighthawks	3 - 2	3OT	Hershey Bears

April 15	New Haven Nighthawks	7 - 1	Hershey Bears

New Haven won series 4 - 1

== Division Finals ==
=== Northern Division ===
==== (1) Fredericton Express vs. (3) Maine Mariners ====
April 26	Fredericton Express	1 - 2	Maine Mariners

April 28	Fredericton Express	6 - 3	Maine Mariners

May 1	Maine Mariners	3 - 2	OT	Fredericton Express

May 4	Maine Mariners	3 - 2	Fredericton Express

May 7	Maine Mariners	4 - 7	Fredericton Express

May 9	Fredericton Express	3 - 4	Maine Mariners

Maine won series 4 - 2

=== Southern Division ===
==== (1) Rochester Americans vs. (3) New Haven Nighthawks ====
April 20	Rochester Americans	6 - 3	New Haven Nighthawks

April 22	Rochester Americans	2 - 3	3OT	New Haven Nighthawks

April 25	New Haven Nighthawks	4 - 5	2OT	Rochester Americans

April 26	New Haven Nighthawks	1 - 2	2OT	Rochester Americans

April 29	Rochester Americans	3 - 4	New Haven Nighthawks

May 3	New Haven Nighthawks	4 - 2	Rochester Americans

May 6	Rochester Americans	4 - 2	New Haven Nighthawks

Rochester won series 4 - 3

== Calder Cup Final ==
=== (S1) Rochester Americans vs. (N3) Maine Mariners ===
May 13	Rochester Americans	3 - 2	Maine Mariners

May 15	Rochester Americans	4 - 3	Maine Mariners

May 17	Maine Mariners	1 - 5	Rochester Americans

May 19	Maine Mariners	1 - 3	Rochester Americans

Rochester won series 4 - 0

== See also ==
- 1982–83 AHL season
- List of AHL seasons

Preceded by 1982 Calder Cup playoffs	Calder Cup playoffs 1983	Succeeded by 1984 Calder Cup playoffs
