= Mark Holden (ice hockey) =

American ice hockey player (born 1957)

- Born: June 12, 1957 (age 68) Weymouth, Massachusetts, U.S.
- Height: 5 ft 10 in (178 cm)
- Weight: 165 lb (75 kg; 11 st 11 lb)
- Position: Goaltender
- Caught: Left
- Played for: Winnipeg Jets; Montreal Canadiens
- NHL draft: 160th overall, 1977; Montreal Canadiens
- Playing career: 1980–1986

Mark Michael Holden (born June 12, 1957) is an American former professional ice hockey goaltender who played eight games in the National Hockey League between 1981 and 1985: four games in the National Hockey League for the Montreal Canadiens and four games for the Winnipeg Jets.

== Career ==
Selected by the Canadiens in the 1977 NHL Amateur Draft, Holden spent four years at Brown University before turning pro in 1980. For the next four seasons, he mainly played for the Canadiens' American Hockey League affiliate, making his NHL debut on January 23, 1982 against the Calgary Flames. In October 1984 Holden was traded to the Jets in exchange for Doug Soetaert. He would play four games for the Jets and spent the majority of the next two seasons in the minor leagues, retiring in 1986.

== Career statistics ==
=== Regular season and playoffs ===
			Regular season									Playoffs
Season	Team	League	GP	W	L	T	MIN	GA	SO	GAA	SV%	GP	W	L	MIN	GA	SO	GAA	SV%
1976–77	Brown University	ECAC	5	—	—	—	82	5	0	3.68	—	—	—	—	—	—	—	—	—
1977–78	Brown University	ECAC	10	4	6	0	590	33	1	3.36	—	—	—	—	—	—	—	—	—
1978–79	Brown University	ECAC	13	7	6	0	755	49	0	3.90	.890	—	—	—	—	—	—	—	—
1979–80	Brown University	ECAC	26	10	14	2	1508	93	0	3.70	.894	—	—	—	—	—	—	—	—
1980–81	Nova Scotia Voyageurs	AHL	42	20	17	1	2223	127	2	3.43	.853	3	0	3	159	12	0	4.53	—
1981–82	Montreal Canadiens	NHL	1	0	0	0	20	0	0	0.00	1.000	—	—	—	—	—	—	—	—
1981–82	Nova Scotia Voyageurs	AHL	44	19	19	5	2534	142	0	3.36	—	7	2	5	435	21	0	2.90	—
1982–83	Montreal Canadiens	NHL	2	0	1	1	87	6	0	4.12	.857	—	—	—	—	—	—	—	—
1982–83	Nova Scotia Voyageurs	AHL	41	21	16	1	2369	160	0	4.05	.866	6	3	2	319	13	0	2.44	—
1983–84	Montreal Canadiens	NHL	1	0	1	0	52	4	0	4.64	.765	—	—	—	—	—	—	—	—
1983–84	Nova Scotia Voyageurs	AHL	47	19	8	7	2739	153	0	3.35	.882	10	4	6	534	40	0	4.49	—
1984–85	Winnipeg Jets	NHL	4	2	0	0	213	15	0	4.22	.856	—	—	—	—	—	—	—	—
1984–85	Nova Scotia Oilers	AHL	22	8	12	1	1261	87	1	4.14	.853	—	—	—	—	—	—	—	—
1985–86	Sherbrooke Canadiens	AHL	12	5	7	0	696	52	0	4.48	.849	—	—	—	—	—	—	—	—
1985–86	Fort Wayne Komets	IHL	9	3	3	0	496	26	1	3.14	.912	—	—	—	—	—	—	—	—
NHL totals			8	2	2	1	373	25	0	4.03	.850	—	—	—	—	—	—	—	—

== Awards and honors ==
Award	Year
AHCA East All-American	1979–80
