= 1987 Calder Cup playoffs =

North American ice hockey tournament

Tournament details
- Dates: April 8 – May 23, 1987
- Teams: 8

Final positions
- Champions: Rochester Americans
- Runners-up: Sherbrooke Canadiens

The 1987 Calder Cup playoffs of the American Hockey League began on April 8, 1987. The eight teams that qualified, four from each division, played best-of-seven series for Division Semifinals and Division Finals. The division champions played a best-of-seven series for the Calder Cup. The Calder Cup Final ended on May 23, 1987, with the Rochester Americans defeating the Sherbrooke Canadiens four games to three to win the Calder Cup for the fifth time in team history. Rochester's Dave Fenyves won the Jack A. Butterfield Trophy as AHL playoff MVP.

Sherbrooke set an AHL record for goals scored in one playoff with 85. The Cape Breton Oilers tied this record in 1993.

== Playoff seeds ==
After the 1986–87 AHL regular season, the top four teams from each division qualified for the playoffs. The Sherbrooke Canadiens finished the regular season with the best overall record.

=== Northern Division ===
1. Sherbrooke Canadiens - 102 points
2. Adirondack Red Wings - 93 points
3. Moncton Golden Flames - 92 points
4. Nova Scotia Oilers - 79 points

=== Southern Division ===
1. Rochester Americans - 101 points
2. Binghamton Whalers - 101 points
3. New Haven Nighthawks - 99 points
4. Hershey Bears - 87 points

== Bracket ==
Division Semifinals
1	Sherbrooke	4
4	Nova Scotia	1
Northern Division
2	Adirondack	4
3	Moncton	2
1	Rochester	4
4	Hershey	1
Southern Division
2	Binghamton	4
3	New Haven	3

Division Finals
1	Sherbrooke	4
2	Adirondack	1
1	Rochester	4
2	Binghamton	2

Calder Cup Final
N1	Sherbrooke	3
S1	Rochester	4

In each round, the team that earned more points during the regular season receives home ice advantage, meaning they receive the "extra" game on home-ice if the series reaches the maximum number of games. There is no set series format due to arena scheduling conflicts and travel considerations.

== Division Semifinals ==
Note: Home team is listed first.

=== Northern Division ===
==== (1) Sherbrooke Canadiens vs. (4) Nova Scotia Oilers ====
April 10	Sherbrooke Canadiens	6 - 1	Nova Scotia Oilers

April 12	Sherbrooke Canadiens	8 - 5	Nova Scotia Oilers

April 13	Nova Scotia Oilers	2 - 3	OT	Sherbrooke Canadiens

April 15	Nova Scotia Oilers	4 - 3	Sherbrooke Canadiens

April 17	Sherbrooke Canadiens	5 - 4	OT	Nova Scotia Oilers

Sherbrooke won series 4 – 1

==== (2) Adirondack Red Wings vs. (3) Moncton Golden Flames ====
April 9	Adirondack Red Wings	3 - 4	Moncton Golden Flames

April 11	Adirondack Red Wings	5 - 4	Moncton Golden Flames

April 15	Moncton Golden Flames	1 - 3	Adirondack Red Wings

April 17	Moncton Golden Flames	2 - 1	OT	Adirondack Red Wings

April 19	Adirondack Red Wings	6 - 3	Moncton Golden Flames

April 21	Moncton Golden Flames	3 - 7	Adirondack Red Wings

Adirondack won series 4 - 2

=== Southern Division ===
==== (1) Rochester Americans vs. (4) Hershey Bears ====
April 9	Rochester Americans	5 - 2	Hershey Bears

April 11	Rochester Americans	5 - 4	OT	Hershey Bears

April 12	Hershey Bears	3 - 1	Rochester Americans

April 15	Hershey Bears	5 - 6	Rochester Americans

April 17	Rochester Americans	7 - 3	Hershey Bears

Rochester won series 4 - 1

==== (2) Binghamton Whalers vs. (3) New Haven Nighthawks ====
April 8	Binghamton Whalers	4 - 1	New Haven Nighthawks

April 10	Binghamton Whalers	5 - 4	New Haven Nighthawks

April 11	New Haven Nighthawks	3 - 1	Binghamton Whalers

April 15	New Haven Nighthawks	1 - 2	Binghamton Whalers

April 18	Binghamton Whalers	3 - 4	OT	New Haven Nighthawks

April 19	New Haven Nighthawks	4 - 1	Binghamton Whalers

April 21	Binghamton Whalers	6 - 2	New Haven Nighthawks

Binghamton won series 4 - 3

== Division Finals ==
=== Northern Division ===
==== (1) Sherbrooke Canadiens vs. (2) Adirondack Red Wings ====
April 25	Sherbrooke Canadiens	3 - 1	Adirondack Red Wings

April 27	Sherbrooke Canadiens	5 - 4	2OT	Adirondack Red Wings

April 29	Adirondack Red Wings	3 - 2	Sherbrooke Canadiens

May 1	Adirondack Red Wings	2 - 7	Sherbrooke Canadiens

May 3	Sherbrooke Canadiens	10 - 4	Adirondack Red Wings

Sherbrooke won series 4 - 1

=== Southern Division ===
==== (1) Rochester Americans vs. (2) Binghamton Whalers ====
April 23	Rochester Americans	2 - 0	Binghamton Whalers

April 24	Binghamton Whalers	1 - 4	Rochester Americans

April 26	Rochester Americans	2 - 5	Binghamton Whalers

April 27	Binghamton Whalers	1 - 6	Rochester Americans

April 29	Rochester Americans	2 - 3	OT	Binghamton Whalers

May 2	Rochester Americans	4 - 2	Binghamton Whalers

Rochester won series 4 - 2

== Calder Cup Final ==
=== (N1) Sherbrooke Canadiens vs. (S1) Rochester Americans ===
May 7	Sherbrooke Canadiens	7 - 5	Rochester Americans

May 9	Sherbrooke Canadiens	3 - 4	Rochester Americans

May 12	Rochester Americans	6 - 4	Sherbrooke Canadiens

May 14	Rochester Americans	3 - 7	Sherbrooke Canadiens

May 17	Sherbrooke Canadiens	6 - 1	Rochester Americans

May 20	Rochester Americans	7 - 4	Sherbrooke Canadiens

May 23	Sherbrooke Canadiens	2 - 4	Rochester Americans

Rochester won series 4 - 3

== See also ==
- 1986–87 AHL season
- List of AHL seasons

Preceded by 1986 Calder Cup playoffs	Calder Cup playoffs 1987	Succeeded by 1988 Calder Cup playoffs
