= 1982 Calder Cup playoffs =

North American ice hockey tournament

Tournament details
- Dates: April 7 – May 10, 1982
- Teams: 8

Final positions
- Champions: New Brunswick Hawks
- Runner-up: Binghamton Whalers

The 1982 Calder Cup playoffs of the American Hockey League began on April 7, 1982. The eight teams that qualified played best-of-five series for Division Semifinals and best-of-seven series for Division Finals. The division champions played a best-of-seven series for the Calder Cup. The Calder Cup Final ended on May 10, 1982, with the New Brunswick Hawks defeating the Binghamton Whalers four games to one to win the Calder Cup for the only time in team history.

== Playoff seeds ==
After the 1981–82 AHL regular season, the top four teams from each division qualified for the playoffs. However, since the fifth-placed team of the Southern division (Adirondack) earned more points than the fourth-placed team in the Northern division (Springfield), Adirondack played in the Northern division portion of the bracket in place of Springfield. The New Brunswick Hawks finished the regular season with the best overall record.

=== Northern Division ===
1. New Brunswick Hawks - 107 points
2. Maine Mariners - 101 points
3. Nova Scotia Voyageurs - 80 points

=== Southern Division ===
1. Binghamton Whalers - 98 points
2. Rochester Americans - 89 points
3. New Haven Nighthawks - 86 points
4. Hershey Bears - 78 points
5. Adirondack Red Wings - 77 points (Played in the Northern division part of the bracket in place of Springfield due to earning more points during the regular season.)

== Bracket ==
Division Semifinals
N1	New Brunswick	3
S5	Adirondack	2
Northern Division
N2	Maine	1
N3	Nova Scotia	3
S1	Binghamton	3
S4	Hershey	2
Southern Division
S2	Rochester	3
S3	New Haven	1

Division Finals
N1	New Brunswick	4
N3	Nova Scotia	1
S1	Binghamton	4
S2	Rochester	1

Calder Cup Final
N1	New Brunswick	4
S1	Binghamton	1

In each round, the team that earned more points during the regular season receives home ice advantage, meaning they receive the "extra" game on home-ice if the series reaches the maximum number of games. There is no set series format due to arena scheduling conflicts and travel considerations.

== Division Semifinals ==
Note 1: Home team is listed first.
Note 2: The number of overtime periods played (where applicable) is not indicated

=== Northern Division ===
==== (N1) New Brunswick Hawks vs. (S5) Adirondack Red Wings ====
April 7	New Brunswick Hawks	1 - 3	Adirondack Red Wings

April 9	New Brunswick Hawks	4 - 3	Adirondack Red Wings

April 10	Adirondack Red Wings	6 - 3	New Brunswick Hawks

April 13	Adirondack Red Wings	5 - 8	New Brunswick Hawks

April 15	New Brunswick Hawks	6 - 3	Adirondack Red Wings

New Brunswick won series 3 – 2

==== (N2) Maine Mariners vs. (N3) Nova Scotia Voyageurs ====
April 8	Maine Mariners	6 - 7	Nova Scotia Voyageurs

April 9	Maine Mariners	4 - 3	OT	Nova Scotia Voyageurs

April 12	Nova Scotia Voyageurs	3 - 1	Maine Mariners

April 14	Nova Scotia Voyageurs	6 - 3	Maine Mariners

Nova Scotia won series 3 - 1

=== Southern Division ===
==== (S1) Binghamton Whalers vs. (S4) Hershey Bears ====
April 7	Binghamton Whalers	6 - 4	Hershey Bears

April 9	Binghamton Whalers	1 - 5	Hershey Bears

April 10	Hershey Bears	5 - 6	Binghamton Whalers

April 13	Hershey Bears	7 - 4	Binghamton Whalers

April 15	Binghamton Whalers	9 - 3	Hershey Bears

Binghamton won series 3 - 2

==== (S2) Rochester Americans vs. (S3) New Haven Nighthawks ====
April 7	Rochester Americans	4 - 3	New Haven Nighthawks

April 8	Rochester Americans	8 - 7	OT	New Haven Nighthawks

April 10	New Haven Nighthawks	3 - 2	4OT	Rochester Americans

April 14	New Haven Nighthawks	2 - 5	Rochester Americans

Rochester won series 3 - 1

== Division Finals ==
=== Northern Division ===
==== (N1) New Brunswick Hawks vs. (N3) Nova Scotia Voyageurs ====
April 19	New Brunswick Hawks	3 - 2	OT	Nova Scotia Voyageurs

April 22	New Brunswick Hawks	3 - 0	Nova Scotia Voyageurs

April 24	Nova Scotia Voyageurs	1 - 5	New Brunswick Hawks

April 26	Nova Scotia Voyageurs	4 - 3	New Brunswick Hawks

April 28	New Brunswick Hawks	2 - 1	OT	Nova Scotia Voyageurs

New Brunswick won series 4 - 1

=== Southern Division ===
==== (S1) Binghamton Whalers vs. (S2) Rochester Americans ====
April 17	Binghamton Whalers	5 - 3	Rochester Americans

April 21	Binghamton Whalers	5 - 3	Rochester Americans

April 23	Rochester Americans	4 - 2	Binghamton Whalers

April 25	Rochester Americans	1 - 5	Binghamton Whalers

April 26	Binghamton Whalers	5 - 3	Rochester Americans

Binghamton won series 4 - 1

== Calder Cup Final ==
=== (N1) New Brunswick Hawks vs. (S1) Binghamton Whalers ===
May 1	New Brunswick Hawks	7 - 4	Binghamton Whalers

May 3	New Brunswick Hawks	2 - 3	Binghamton Whalers

May 6	Binghamton Whalers	1 - 5	New Brunswick Hawks

May 8	Binghamton Whalers	1 - 4	New Brunswick Hawks

May 10	New Brunswick Hawks	4 - 2	Binghamton Whalers

New Brunswick won series 4 - 1

== See also ==
- 1981–82 AHL season
- List of AHL seasons

Preceded by 1981 Calder Cup playoffs	Calder Cup playoffs 1982	Succeeded by 1983 Calder Cup Playoffs
