= 1990 Calder Cup playoffs =

North American ice hockey tournament

Tournament details
- Dates: April 4 – May 18, 1990
- Teams: 8

Final positions
- Champions: Springfield Indians
- Runner-up: Rochester Americans

The 1990 Calder Cup playoffs of the American Hockey League began on April 4, 1990. The eight teams that qualified, four from each division, played best-of-seven series for Division Semifinals and Division Finals. The division champions played a best-of-seven series for the Calder Cup. The Calder Cup Final ended on May 18, 1990, with the Springfield Indians defeating the Rochester Americans four games to two to win the Calder Cup for the sixth time in team history. Despite an injury preventing him from playing in the final game, Springfield goaltender Jeff Hackett won the Jack A. Butterfield Trophy as the MVP of the playoffs.

The league instituted trophies for division champions in the playoffs; the Richard F. Canning Trophy in the North Division, and the Robert W. Clarke Trophy in the South Division.

== Playoff seeds ==
After the 1989-90 AHL regular season, the top four teams from each division qualified for the playoffs. The Sherbrooke Canadiens finished the regular season with the best overall record for the second straight season.

=== Northern Division ===
1. Sherbrooke Canadiens - 102 points
2. Cape Breton Oilers - 85 points
3. Springfield Indians - 80 points
4. Halifax Citadels - 80 points

=== Southern Division ===
1. Rochester Americans - 95 points
2. Adirondack Red Wings - 95 points
3. Baltimore Skipjacks - 93 points
4. Utica Devils - 92 points

== Bracket ==
Division Semifinals
1	Sherbrooke	4
4	Halifax	2
Northern Division
2	Cape Breton	2
3	Springfield	4
1	Rochester	4
4	Utica	1
Southern Division
2	Adirondack	2
3	Baltimore	4

Division Finals
1	Sherbrooke	2
3	Springfield	4
1	Rochester	4
3	Baltimore	2

Calder Cup Final
N3	Springfield	4
S1	Rochester	2

In each round, the team that earned more points during the regular season receives home ice advantage, meaning they receive the "extra" game on home-ice if the series reaches the maximum number of games. There is no set series format due to arena scheduling conflicts and travel considerations.

== Division Semifinals ==
Note: Home team is listed first.

=== Northern Division ===
==== (1) Sherbrooke Canadiens vs. (4) Halifax Citadels ====
April 4	Sherbrooke Canadiens	2 - 4	Halifax Citadels

April 6	Sherbrooke Canadiens	7 - 4	Halifax Citadels

April 9	Halifax Citadels	7 - 4	Sherbrooke Canadiens

April 10	Halifax Citadels	3 - 8	Sherbrooke Canadiens

April 12	Sherbrooke Canadiens	4 - 3	OT	Halifax Citadels

April 14	Halifax Citadels	2 - 6	Sherbrooke Canadiens

Sherbrooke won series 4 – 2

==== (2) Cape Breton Oilers vs. (3) Springfield Indians ====
April 5	Cape Breton Oilers	4 - 3	Springfield Indians

April 7	Cape Breton Oilers	2 - 3	OT	Springfield Indians

April 10	Springfield Indians	8 - 3	Cape Breton Oilers

April 12	Springfield Indians	5 - 4	OT	Cape Breton Oilers

April 14	Cape Breton Oilers	8 - 7	OT	Springfield Indians

April 17	Springfield Indians	5 - 3	Cape Breton Oilers

Springfield won series 4 - 2

=== Southern Division ===
==== (1) Rochester Americans vs. (4) Utica Devils ====
April 5	Rochester Americans	5 - 4	Utica Devils

April 7	Utica Devils	1 - 3	Rochester Americans

April 8	Rochester Americans	3 - 1	Utica Devils

April 11	Utica Devils	7 - 3	Rochester Americans

April 13	Rochester Americans	6 - 2	Utica Devils

Rochester won series 4 - 1

==== (2) Adirondack Red Wings vs. (3) Baltimore Skipjacks ====
April 6	Adirondack Red Wings	2 - 1	Baltimore Skipjacks

April 7	Adirondack Red Wings	3 - 8	Baltimore Skipjacks

April 9	Baltimore Skipjacks	5 - 1	Adirondack Red Wings

April 10	Baltimore Skipjacks	4 - 5	OT	Adirondack Red Wings

April 13	Adirondack Red Wings	3 - 6	Baltimore Skipjacks

April 14	Baltimore Skipjacks	5 - 3	Adirondack Red Wings

Baltimore won series 4 - 2

== Division Finals ==
=== Northern Division ===
==== (1) Sherbrooke Canadiens vs. (3) Springfield Indians ====
April 20	Sherbrooke Canadiens	3 - 4	Springfield Indians

April 22	Sherbrooke Canadiens	7 - 4	Springfield Indians

April 25	Springfield Indians	3 - 2	Sherbrooke Canadiens

April 28	Springfield Indians	5 - 2	Sherbrooke Canadiens

April 29	Sherbrooke Canadiens	7 - 4	Springfield Indians

May 1	Springfield Indians	5 - 4	OT	Sherbrooke Canadiens

Springfield won series 4 - 2

=== Southern Division ===
==== (1) Rochester Americans vs. (3) Baltimore Skipjacks ====
April 17	Rochester Americans	6 - 4	Baltimore Skipjacks

April 20	Rochester Americans	4 - 1	Baltimore Skipjacks

April 21	Baltimore Skipjacks	2 - 0	Rochester Americans

April 23	Baltimore Skipjacks	3 - 1	Rochester Americans

April 25	Rochester Americans	5 - 4	OT	Baltimore Skipjacks

April 28	Baltimore Skipjacks	5 - 8	Rochester Americans

Rochester won series 4 - 2

== Calder Cup Final ==
=== (S1) Rochester Americans vs. (N3) Springfield Indians ===
May 4	Rochester Americans	6 - 7	Springfield Indians

May 6	Rochester Americans	1 - 3	Springfield Indians

May 8	Springfield Indians	1 - 5	Rochester Americans

May 11	Springfield Indians	5 - 6	Rochester Americans

May 13	Rochester Americans	1 - 2	OT	Springfield Indians

May 18	Springfield Indians	4 - 3	OT	Rochester Americans

Springfield won series 4 - 2

== See also ==
- 1989–90 AHL season
- List of AHL seasons

Preceded by 1989 Calder Cup playoffs	Calder Cup playoffs 1990	Succeeded by 1991 Calder Cup playoffs
