= Moncton Alpines =

Moncton Alpines may refer to:

- Moncton Wildcats, a junior ice hockey team in the Quebec Major Junior Hockey League originally known as the Alpines
- Moncton Golden Flames, a defunct professional ice hockey team based in Moncton, originally known as the Alpines
