= 1989 Calder Cup playoffs =

North American ice hockey tournament

Tournament details
- Dates: April 4 – May 16, 1989
- Teams: 8

Final positions
- Champions: Adirondack Red Wings
- Runner-up: New Haven Nighthawks

The 1989 Calder Cup playoffs of the American Hockey League began on April 4, 1989. The eight teams that qualified, four from each division, played best-of-seven series for Division Semifinals and Division Finals. The division champions played a best-of-seven series for the Calder Cup. The Calder Cup Final ended on May 16, 1989, with the Adirondack Red Wings defeating the New Haven Nighthawks four games to one to win the Calder Cup for the third time in team history. Adirondack's Sam St. Laurent won the Jack A. Butterfield Trophy as AHL playoff MVP.

== Playoff seeds ==
After the 1988–89 AHL regular season, the top four teams from each division qualified for the playoffs. The Sherbrooke Canadiens finished the regular season with the best overall record.

=== Northern Division ===
1. Sherbrooke Canadiens - 103 points
2. Halifax Citadels - 92 points
3. Moncton Hawks - 83 points
4. New Haven Nighthawks - 80 points

=== Southern Division ===
1. Adirondack Red Wings - 100 points
2. Hershey Bears - 90 points
3. Utica Devils - 83 points
4. Newmarket Saints - 82 points

== Bracket ==
Division Semifinals
1	Sherbrooke	2
4	New Haven	4
Northern Division
2	Halifax	0
3	Moncton	4
1	Adirondack	4
4	Newmarket	1
Southern Division
2	Hershey	4
3	Utica	1

Division Finals
4	New Haven	4
3	Moncton	2
1	Adirondack	4
2	Hershey	3

Calder Cup Final
N4	New Haven	1
S1	Adirondack	4

In each round, the team that earned more points during the regular season receives home ice advantage, meaning they receive the "extra" game on home-ice if the series reaches the maximum number of games. There is no set series format due to arena scheduling conflicts and travel considerations.

== Division Semifinals ==
Note: Home team is listed first.

=== Northern Division ===
==== (1) Sherbrooke Canadiens vs. (4) New Haven Nighthawks ====
April 4	Sherbrooke Canadiens	6 - 4	New Haven Nighthawks

April 7	Sherbrooke Canadiens	7 - 4	New Haven Nighthawks

April 9	New Haven Nighthawks	5 - 3	Sherbrooke Canadiens

April 12	New Haven Nighthawks	6 - 5	OT	Sherbrooke Canadiens

April 14	Sherbrooke Canadiens	1 - 4	New Haven Nighthawks

April 16	New Haven Nighthawks	5 - 4	OT	Sherbrooke Canadiens

New Haven won series 4 – 2

==== (2) Halifax Citadels vs. (3) Moncton Hawks ====
April 6	Halifax Citadels	2 - 5	Moncton Hawks

April 8	Halifax Citadels	4 - 5	Moncton Hawks

April 10	Moncton Hawks	6 - 1	Halifax Citadels

April 12	Moncton Hawks	5 - 2	Halifax Citadels

Moncton won series 4 - 0

=== Southern Division ===
==== (1) Adirondack Red Wings vs. (4) Newmarket Saints ====
April 6	Adirondack Red Wings	7 - 3	Newmarket Saints

April 8	Adirondack Red Wings	2 - 6	Newmarket Saints

April 11	Newmarket Saints	4 - 7	Adirondack Red Wings

April 14	Newmarket Saints	7 - 9	Adirondack Red Wings

April 15	Adirondack Red Wings	3 - 0	Newmarket Saints

Adirondack won series 4 - 1

==== (2) Hershey Bears vs. (3) Utica Devils ====
April 6	Hershey Bears	6 - 1	Utica Devils

April 8	Hershey Bears	6 - 1	Utica Devils

April 11	Utica Devils	3 - 2	Hershey Bears

April 13	Utica Devils	2 - 3	Hershey Bears

April 15	Hershey Bears	7 - 1	Utica Devils

Hershey won series 4 - 1

== Division Finals ==
=== Northern Division ===
==== (3) Moncton Hawks vs. (4) New Haven Nighthawks ====
April 19	Moncton Hawks	6 - 3	New Haven Nighthawks

April 20	Moncton Hawks	1 - 6	New Haven Nighthawks

April 23	New Haven Nighthawks	3 - 0	Moncton Hawks

April 25	New Haven Nighthawks	7 - 4	Moncton Hawks

April 28	Moncton Hawks	6 - 2	New Haven Nighthawks

May 2	New Haven Nighthawks	6 - 2	Moncton Hawks

New Haven won series 4 - 2

=== Southern Division ===
==== (1) Adirondack Red Wings vs. (2) Hershey Bears ====
April 19	Adirondack Red Wings	3 - 4	Hershey Bears

April 21	Adirondack Red Wings	3 - 5	Hershey Bears

April 22	Hershey Bears	1 - 0	Adirondack Red Wings

April 24	Hershey Bears	3 - 6	Adirondack Red Wings

April 26	Adirondack Red Wings	3 - 2	OT	Hershey Bears

April 28	Hershey Bears	2 - 4	Adirondack Red Wings

April 30	Adirondack Red Wings	2 - 1	OT	Hershey Bears

Adirondack won series 4 - 3

== Calder Cup Final ==
=== (S1) Adirondack Red Wings vs. (N4) New Haven Nighthawks ===
May 4	Adirondack Red Wings	7 - 6	2OT	New Haven Nighthawks

May 5	Adirondack Red Wings	8 - 2	New Haven Nighthawks

May 7	New Haven Nighthawks	4 - 3	Adirondack Red Wings

May 8	New Haven Nighthawks	0 - 6	Adirondack Red Wings

May 16	Adirondack Red Wings	10 - 7	New Haven Nighthawks

Adirondack won series 4 - 1

== See also ==
- 1988–89 AHL season
- List of AHL seasons

Preceded by 1988 Calder Cup playoffs	Calder Cup playoffs 1989	Succeeded by 1990 Calder Cup playoffs
