= 1985–86 AHL season =

- League: American Hockey League
- Sport: Ice hockey

Regular season
- F. G. "Teddy" Oke Trophy: Adirondack Red Wings
- Season MVP: Paul Gardner
- Top scorer: Paul Gardner
- MVP: Tim Tookey

Playoffs
- Champions: Adirondack Red Wings
- Runners-up: Hershey Bears

AHL seasons
- 1984–85 1986–87

The 1985–86 AHL season was the 50th season of the American Hockey League. Thirteen teams played 80 games each in the schedule. The Hershey Bears finished first overall in the regular season. The Adirondack Red Wings won their second Calder Cup championship.

== Final standings ==
- y– indicates team clinched division and a playoff spot
- x– indicates team clinched a playoff spot
- e– indicates team was eliminated from playoff contention

North Division	GP	W	L	T	Pts	GF	GA
y–Adirondack Red Wings (DET)	80	41	31	8	90	339	298
x–Maine Mariners (NJD)	80	40	31	9	89	274	285
x–Moncton Golden Flames (BOS/CGY)	80	34	34	12	80	294	307
x–Fredericton Express (QUE/VAN)	80	35	37	8	78	319	311
e–Sherbrooke Canadiens (MTL/WIN)	80	33	38	9	75	340	341
e–Nova Scotia Oilers (CHI/EDM)	80	29	43	8	66	314	353

South Division	GP	W	L	T	Pts	GF	GA
y–Hershey Bears (PHI)	80	48	29	3	99	346	292
x–Binghamton Whalers (HFD/WSH)	80	41	34	5	87	316	290
x–St. Catharines Saints (TOR)	80	38	37	5	81	304	308
x–New Haven Nighthawks (LAK/NYR)	80	36	37	7	79	340	343
e–Springfield Indians (MNS/NYI)	80	36	39	5	77	301	309
e–Rochester Americans (BUF)	80	34	39	7	75	320	337
e–Baltimore Skipjacks (PIT)	80	28	44	8	64	271	304

== Scoring leaders ==
Note: GP = Games played; G = Goals; A = Assists; Pts = Points; PIM = Penalty minutes

Player	Team	GP	G	A	Pts	PIM
Paul Gardner	Rochester Americans	71	61	51	112	16
Jody Gage	Rochester Americans	73	42	57	99	56
Ross Fitzpatrick	Hershey Bears	77	50	47	97	28
Tim Tookey	Hershey Bears	69	35	62	97	66
Wes Jarvis	St. Catharines Saints	74	36	60	96	38
Daryl Evans	Binghamton Whalers	69	40	52	92	50
Geordie Robertson	Adirondack Red Wings	79	36	56	92	99
Paul Fenton	Binghamton Whalers	75	53	35	88	87
Serge Boisvert	Sherbrooke Canadiens	69	40	48	88	18
Larry Floyd	Maine Mariners	80	29	58	87	25
Tom Roulston	Baltimore Skipjacks	73	38	49	87	38

- complete list

== Calder Cup playoffs ==
Division Semifinals
1	Adirondack	4
4	Fredericton	2
North Division
2	Maine	1
3	Moncton	4
1	Hershey	4
4	New Haven	1
South Division
2	Binghamton	2
3	St. Catharines	4

Division Finals
1	Adirondack	4
3	Moncton	1
1	Hershey	4
3	St. Catharines	3

Calder Cup Final
N1	Adirondack	4
S1	Hershey	2

== Trophy and award winners ==
Team awards

Calder Cup; Playoff champions:	Adirondack Red Wings
F. G. "Teddy" Oke Trophy; Regular Season champions, North Division:	Adirondack Red Wings
John D. Chick Trophy; Regular Season champions, South Division:	Hershey Bears

Individual awards

Les Cunningham Award; Most valuable player:	Paul Gardner - Rochester Americans
John B. Sollenberger Trophy; Top point scorer:	Paul Gardner - Rochester Americans
Dudley "Red" Garrett Memorial Award; Rookie of the year:	Ron Hextall - Hershey Bears
Eddie Shore Award; Defenceman of the year:	Jim Wiemer - New Haven Nighthawks
Aldege "Baz" Bastien Memorial Award; Best Goaltender:	Sam St. Laurent - Maine Mariners
Harry "Hap" Holmes Memorial Award; Lowest goals against average:	Sam St. Laurent & Karl Friesen - Maine Mariners
Louis A.R. Pieri Memorial Award; Coach of the year:	Bill Dineen - Adirondack Red Wings
Fred T. Hunt Memorial Award; Sportsmanship / Perseverance:	Steve Tsujiura - Maine Mariners
Jack A. Butterfield Trophy; MVP of the playoffs:	Tim Tookey - Hershey Bears

Other awards

James C. Hendy Memorial Award; Most outstanding executive:	George Guilbault
James H. Ellery Memorial Awards; Outstanding media coverage:	Jerry Crasnick, Maine, (newspaper); Jim Gagliardi, Adirondack, (radio); Rich Funke, Rochester, (television)
Ken McKenzie Award; Outstanding marketing executive:	Randy Scott, Rochester Americans

== See also ==
- List of AHL seasons

Preceded by 1984–85 AHL season	AHL seasons	Succeeded by 1986–87 AHL season
