= 1984–85 AHL season =

- League: American Hockey League
- Sport: Ice hockey

Regular season
- F. G. "Teddy" Oke Trophy: Maine Mariners
- Season MVP: Paul Gardner
- Top scorer: Paul Gardner
- MVP: Brian Skrudland

Playoffs
- Champions: Sherbrooke Canadiens
- Runners-up: Baltimore Skipjacks

AHL seasons
- 1983–84 1985–86

The 1984–85 AHL season was the 49th season of the American Hockey League. Thirteen teams played 80 games each in the schedule. The Binghamton Whalers finished first overall in the regular season. The Sherbrooke Canadiens won their first Calder Cup championship.

== Team changes ==
- The Sherbrooke Jets cease operations.
- The Nova Scotia Voyageurs move to Sherbrooke, Quebec, becoming the Sherbrooke Canadiens.
- The Nova Scotia Oilers join the AHL as an expansion team, based in Halifax, Nova Scotia, playing in the North Division.
- The Moncton Alpines become the Moncton Golden Flames.

== Final standings ==
- y– indicates team clinched division and a playoff spot
- x– indicates team clinched a playoff spot
- e– indicates team was eliminated from playoff contention

| North Division | GP | W | L | T | Pts | GF | GA |
|---|---|---|---|---|---|---|---|
| y–Maine Mariners (NJD) | 80 | 38 | 32 | 10 | 86 | 296 | 266 |
| x–Fredericton Express (QUE/VAN) | 80 | 36 | 36 | 8 | 80 | 279 | 301 |
| x–Sherbrooke Canadiens (MTL/WIN) | 80 | 37 | 38 | 5 | 79 | 323 | 329 |
| x–Nova Scotia Oilers (EDM) | 80 | 36 | 37 | 7 | 79 | 292 | 295 |
| e–Adirondack Red Wings (DET) | 80 | 35 | 37 | 8 | 78 | 290 | 336 |
| e–Moncton Golden Flames (CGY) | 80 | 32 | 40 | 8 | 72 | 291 | 300 |

| South Division | GP | W | L | T | Pts | GF | GA |
|---|---|---|---|---|---|---|---|
| y–Binghamton Whalers (HFD/WSH) | 80 | 52 | 20 | 8 | 112 | 388 | 265 |
| x–Baltimore Skipjacks (PIT) | 80 | 45 | 27 | 8 | 98 | 326 | 252 |
| x–Rochester Americans (BUF) | 80 | 40 | 27 | 13 | 93 | 333 | 301 |
| x–Springfield Indians (MNS/NYI) | 80 | 36 | 40 | 4 | 76 | 322 | 326 |
| e–New Haven Nighthawks (LAK/NYR) | 80 | 31 | 41 | 8 | 70 | 315 | 341 |
| e–Hershey Bears (BOS/PHI) | 80 | 26 | 43 | 11 | 63 | 315 | 339 |
| e–St. Catharines Saints (TOR) | 80 | 24 | 50 | 6 | 54 | 272 | 391 |

== Scoring leaders ==
Note: GP = Games played; G = Goals; A = Assists; Pts = Points; PIM = Penalty minutes

| Player | Team | GP | G | A | Pts | PIM |
|---|---|---|---|---|---|---|
| Paul Gardner | Binghamton Whalers | 64 | 51 | 79 | 130 | 10 |
| Claude Verret | Rochester Americans | 76 | 40 | 53 | 93 | 12 |
| Pierre Rioux | Moncton Golden Flames | 69 | 25 | 66 | 91 | 14 |
| Steve Thomas | St. Catharines Saints | 64 | 42 | 48 | 90 | 56 |
| Bruce Eakin | Moncton Golden Flames | 78 | 35 | 48 | 83 | 60 |
| Larry Floyd | Maine Mariners | 72 | 30 | 51 | 81 | 24 |
| Claude Larose | Sherbrooke Canadiens | 77 | 36 | 43 | 79 | 4 |
| Serge Boisvert | Sherbrooke Canadiens | 63 | 38 | 41 | 79 | 8 |
| Ray Cote | Nova Scotia Oilers | 79 | 36 | 43 | 79 | 63 |
| Grant Martin | Fredericton Express | 65 | 31 | 47 | 78 | 78 |
| Mike Siltala | Binghamton Whalers | 75 | 42 | 36 | 78 | 53 |

- complete list

== Calder Cup playoffs ==
Division Semifinals
1 | Maine | 4
4 | Nova Scotia | 2
North Division
2 | Fredericton | 2
3 | Sherbrooke | 4
1 | Binghamton | 4
4 | Springfield | 0
South Division
2 | Baltimore | 4
3 | Rochester | 1

Division Finals
1 | Maine | 1
3 | Sherbrooke | 4
1 | Binghamton | 0
2 | Baltimore | 4

Calder Cup Final
N3 | Sherbrooke | 4
S2 | Baltimore | 2

== Trophy and award winners ==
Team awards

| Calder Cup; Playoff champions: | Sherbrooke Canadiens |
| F. G. "Teddy" Oke Trophy; Regular Season champions, North Division: | Maine Mariners |
| John D. Chick Trophy; Regular Season champions, South Division: | Binghamton Whalers |

Individual awards

| Les Cunningham Award; Most valuable player: | Paul Gardner - Binghamton Whalers |
| John B. Sollenberger Trophy; Top point scorer: | Paul Gardner - Binghamton Whalers |
| Dudley "Red" Garrett Memorial Award; Rookie of the year: | Steve Thomas - St. Catharines Saints |
| Eddie Shore Award; Defenceman of the year: | Richie Dunn - Binghamton Whalers |
| Aldege "Baz" Bastien Memorial Award; Best Goaltender: | Jon Casey - Baltimore Skipjacks |
| Harry "Hap" Holmes Memorial Award; Lowest goals against average: | Jon Casey - Baltimore Skipjacks |
| Louis A.R. Pieri Memorial Award; Coach of the year: | Bill Dineen - Adirondack Red Wings |
| Fred T. Hunt Memorial Award; Sportsmanship / Perseverance: | Paul Gardner - Binghamton Whalers |
| Jack A. Butterfield Trophy; MVP of the playoffs: | Brian Skrudland - Sherbrooke Canadiens |

Other awards

| James C. Hendy Memorial Award; Most outstanding executive: | John Haas |
| James H. Ellery Memorial Awards; Outstanding media coverage: | Jerry Crasnick, Maine, (newspaper); Roger Neel, Binghamton, (radio); Phil Smith, Rochester, (television) |
| Ken McKenzie Award; Outstanding marketing executive: | Dale Arnold, Maine Mariners |

== See also ==
- List of AHL seasons

| Preceded by 1983–84 AHL season | AHL seasons | Succeeded by 1985–86 AHL season |
