= St. Catharines Saints =

Defunct American Hockey League team

- City: St. Catharines, Ontario
- League: American Hockey League
- Operated: 1982–1986
- Home arena: Garden City Arena
- Colours: Blue, white
- Owner: Maple Leaf Gardens Limited
- Affiliates: Toronto Maple Leafs

Franchise history
- 1978–1982: New Brunswick Hawks
- 1982–1986: St. Catharines Saints
- 1986–1991: Newmarket Saints
- 1991–2005: St. John's Maple Leafs
- 2005–present: Toronto Marlies

The St. Catharines Saints were a professional ice hockey team in St. Catharines, Ontario. They played in the American Hockey League from 1982 to 1986 as the farm team of the Toronto Maple Leafs.

== History ==
The Moncton-based New Brunswick Hawks had been established in 1978 as members of the American Hockey League (AHL), and were jointly operated by the Chicago Black Hawks and the Toronto Maple Leafs as their farm team. Maple Leaf Gardens Limited (MLGL) and the Black Hawks each owned half of the franchise.

By 1980, Harold Ballard, owner of the Leafs, had decided that they needed a developmental team of their own, with a spokesperson citing the limited number of roster spots as the rationale for the move. MLGL launched the Cincinnati Tigers in the old Central Hockey League in 1981 to serve as their own affiliate, while retaining their share of the New Brunswick Hawks. However, after the Tigers averaged only 1,500 fans and lost $750,000 in their first season, the Leafs folded the Tigers in the spring of 1982. That same summer, with Chicago having already pulled out of New Brunswick in favour of affiliating with the Springfield Indians on their own, the Maple Leafs announced that they would not operate the team in Moncton the following year after they couldn't come to terms with the city on a new arena lease, even though the team had the fifth highest attendance in the league.

The Maple Leafs wanted to relocate the team closer to Toronto, with both St. Catharines and Niagara Falls in Ontario potential destinations for the franchise. When MLGL applied to the AHL to relocate the New Brunswick Hawks to St. Catharines, the nearby Buffalo Sabres initially blocked the move due to objections to a team moving into their territory without prior discussions with them. However, following protests by fans in St. Catharines and threats by Ballard to suspend the Moncton franchise to prevent another AHL team from playing in the city and to sue the Sabres and NHL for $20 million, the relocation was approved unanimously and the franchise became the St. Catharines Saints, serving as the Maple Leafs' primary affiliate. At the same AHL Board of Governors meeting, the Edmonton Oilers received approval to purchase a new AHL franchise to replace the departed Hawks in Moncton, leading to establishment of the Moncton Alpines as their affiliate that fall.

Following the 1985–1986 season, the team moved to Newmarket, Ontario, and became the Newmarket Saints.

An earlier team under this name played in the OHA Senior League in the 1940s and '50s.

== Alumni ==
Former players include:

- Allan Bester
- Bruce Boudreau
- Steve Thomas
- Ken Wregget

=== American Hockey League Hall of Famers ===
AHL Hall of Fame Honored Members
Name	Seasons	Induction Year
Bruce Boudreau	1982-84 (player)	2009

== Season-by-season results ==
=== Regular season ===
Season	Games	Won	Lost	Tied	OTL	Points	Goals for	Goals against	Standing
1982–83	80	33	41	6	—	72	335	368	6th, South
1983–84	80	43	31	6	—	92	364	346	3rd, South
1984–85	80	24	50	6	—	54	272	391	7th, South
1985–86	80	38	37	5	—	81	304	308	3rd, South

=== Playoffs ===
Season	1st round	2nd round	Finals
1982–83	Out of Playoffs		
1983–84	L, 3–4, Rochester	—	—
1984–85	Out of Playoffs		
1985–86	W, 4–2, Binghamton	L, 3–4, Hershey	—

== Team records ==
Goals: Bruce Boudreau (50, 1982–83)
Assists: Bruce Boudreau (72, 1982–83)
Points: Bruce Boudreau (122, 1982–83)
Penalty minutes: Leigh Verstraete (300, 1985–86)
GAA (min. 20 games): Allan Bester (3.64, 1985–86)
SV% (min. 20 games): Allan Bester (.881, 1985–86)
Career goals: Bruce Boudreau (97)
Career assists: Bruce Boudreau (134)
Career points: Bruce Boudreau (231)
Career penalty minutes: Leigh Verstraete (868)
Career goaltending wins: Tim Bernhardt (36)
Career shutouts: Bob Parent (3)
Career games: Craig Muni (269)

== See also ==
- List of ice hockey teams in Ontario
