= Moncton Golden Flames =

- City: Moncton, New Brunswick
- League: American Hockey League
- Operated: 1984–1987
- Home arena: Moncton Coliseum
- Colors: Red, white
- Affiliates: Calgary Flames; Boston Bruins

Franchise history
- 1982–1984: Moncton Alpines
- 1984–1987: Moncton Golden Flames

The Moncton Golden Flames were a professional ice hockey team based in Moncton, New Brunswick, playing home games at the Moncton Coliseum. The team operated in the American Hockey League between 1984 and 1987. The new franchise was purchased by a group of 6 local business men after the previous franchise known as the Moncton Alpines moved to Halifax to become the Nova Scotia Oilers (The Alpines were a minor league affiliate of the Edmonton Oilers). The Golden Flames were the minor league affiliate of the Calgary Flames, and for their final two seasons, had an additional affiliation with the Boston Bruins. The team boasted a number of future NHL stars including Brett Hull, Joel Otto, Mike Vernon, Bill Ranford, Bob Sweeney, Gary Roberts, Lyndon Byers, Dave Reid, Brian Bradley and others. In 1987, team marketing executive Larry Haley was awarded the Ken McKenzie Award for outstanding work.

== History ==
Moncton Alpines
- City: Moncton, New Brunswick
- League: American Hockey League
- Operated: 1982–1984
- Home arena: Moncton Coliseum
- Colors: Blue, orange
- Affiliates: Edmonton Oilers

Franchise history
- 1982–1984 AHL: Moncton Alpines
- 1984–1987 AHL: Moncton Golden Flames

The New Brunswick Hawks of the American Hockey League (AHL) had been established in Moncton in 1978, and were jointly owned and operated by the Toronto Maple Leafs and Chicago Black Hawks as their farm team. In the summer of 1982, with Chicago having already pulled out of New Brunswick in favour of affiliating with the Springfield Indians on their own, the Maple Leafs announced that they would not operate the team in Moncton the following year after they couldn't come to terms with the city on a new arena lease, even though the team had the fifth-highest attendance in the league. At the same AHL Board of Governors meeting that the franchise's relocation to become the St. Catharines Saints was approved, the Edmonton Oilers received approval to purchase a new AHL franchise to replace the departed Hawks in Moncton, leading to establishment of the Moncton Alpines as their affiliate that fall. The team played for two seasons until 1984, coached by Doug Messier both seasons. Following 1984, the team was bought by the Calgary Flames and renamed the Moncton Golden Flames. The franchise folded in 1987, and was replaced by the Winnipeg Jets' affiliate, the Moncton Hawks.

== Coaches ==
- 1984–85 – Pierre Page
- 1985–86 – Terry Crisp
- 1986–87 – Terry Crisp

== Training staff ==
- 1984–87 - Brian Patafie, Mike Baiani, David Lorette, Jamie Druet, Andrew Trites

== Players ==
During the 1986–87 season, Brett Hull won the Dudley "Red" Garrett Memorial Award as the AHL's rookie of the year. Sixty-three Moncton Golden Flames players including Hull, have gone on to play in the NHL. Five players from the Golden Flames also went on to win the Stanley Cup with the 1988–89 Calgary Flames. They are, Joel Otto, Dave Reierson, Gary Roberts, Ken Sabourin and goaltender Mike Vernon.

== Season-by-season results ==
=== Regular season ===
Season	Games	Won	Lost	Tied	OTL	Points	Goals for	Goals against	Standing
1982–83	80	34	39	7	—	75	304	315	5th, North
1983–84	80	32	40	8	—	72	251	278	5th, North
1984–85	80	32	40	8	—	72	291	300	6th, North
1985–86	80	34	34	12	—	80	294	307	3rd, North
1986–87	80	43	31	—	6	92	338	315	3rd, North

=== Playoffs ===
Season	1st round	2nd round	Finals
1982–83	Out of Playoffs		
1983-84	Out of Playoffs		
1984–85	Out of Playoffs		
1985–86	W, 4-1, Maine	L, 1-4, Adirondack	—
1986–87	L, 2-4, Adirondack	—	—

== See also ==
- List of ice hockey teams in New Brunswick
