= 1982–83 AHL season =

- League: American Hockey League
- Sport: Ice hockey

Regular season
- F. G. "Teddy" Oke Trophy: Fredericton Express
- Season MVP: Ross Yates
- Top scorer: Ross Yates

Playoffs
- Champions: Rochester Americans
- Runners-up: Maine Mariners

AHL seasons
- 1981–82 1983–84

The 1982–83 AHL season was the 47th season of the American Hockey League. Thirteen teams played 80 games each in the schedule. The Rochester Americans finished first overall in the regular season, and won their fourth Calder Cup championship.

== Team changes ==
- The New Brunswick Hawks become the St. Catharines Saints based in St. Catharines, Ontario, playing in the South Division.
- The Sherbrooke Jets join the AHL as an expansion team, based in Sherbrooke, Quebec, playing in the North Division.
- The Moncton Alpines join the AHL as an expansion team,
- The Erie Blades merge with the Baltimore Skipjacks of Atlantic Coast Hockey League and play in the South Division of the AHL, based in Baltimore, Maryland.
- The Springfield Indians switch divisions from North to South.
- The Adirondack Red Wings switch divisions from South to North.

== Final standings ==
- y– indicates team clinched division and a playoff spot
- x– indicates team clinched a playoff spot
- e– indicates team was eliminated from playoff contention

North Division	GP	W	L	T	Pts	GF	GA
y–Fredericton Express (QUE/VAN)	80	45	27	8	98	348	284
x–Nova Scotia Voyageurs (MTL)	80	41	34	5	87	378	333
x–Maine Mariners (PHI)	80	39	33	8	86	342	309
x–Adirondack Red Wings (DET)	80	36	39	5	77	329	343
e–Moncton Alpines (EDM)	80	34	39	7	75	304	315
e–Sherbrooke Jets (WIN)	80	22	54	4	48	288	390

South Division	GP	W	L	T	Pts	GF	GA
y–Rochester Americans (BUF)	80	46	25	9	101	389	325
x–Hershey Bears (WSH)	80	40	35	5	85	313	308
x–New Haven Nighthawks (LAK)	80	38	34	8	84	337	329
x–Binghamton Whalers (HFD)	80	36	36	8	80	320	333
e–Baltimore Skipjacks (BOS/PIT)	80	35	36	9	79	362	366
e–St. Catharines Saints (TOR)	80	33	41	6	72	335	368
e–Springfield Indians (CHI)	80	31	43	6	68	282	324

== Scoring leaders ==
Note: GP = Games played; G = Goals; A = Assists; Pts = Points; PIM = Penalty minutes

Player	Team	GP	G	A	Pts	PIM
Ross Yates	Binghamton Whalers	77	41	84	125	28
Bruce Boudreau	St. Catharines Saints	80	50	72	122	65
Geordie Robertson	Rochester Americans	72	46	73	119	83
Mike Gillis	Baltimore Skipjacks	74	32	81	113	33
Mitch Lamoureux	Baltimore Skipjacks	80	57	50	107	107
Jean-Francois Sauve	Rochester Americans	73	30	69	99	10
Tony Currie	Fredericton Express	68	47	48	95	16
Reg Thomas	St. Catharines Saints	80	35	57	92	22
Ray Cote	Moncton Alpines	80	28	63	91	35
Tony Cassolato	Hershey Bears	75	53	38	91	22

- complete list

== Calder Cup playoffs ==
Division Semifinals
1	Fredericton	4
4	Adirondack	2
North Division
2	Nova Scotia	3
3	Maine	4
1	Rochester	4
4	Binghamton	1
South Division
2	Hershey	1
3	New Haven	4

Division Finals
1	Fredericton	2
3	Maine	4
1	Rochester	4
3	New Haven	3

Calder Cup Final
N3	Maine	0
S1	Rochester	4

== Trophy and award winners ==
Team awards

Calder Cup; Playoff champions:	Rochester Americans
F. G. "Teddy" Oke Trophy; Regular Season champions, North Division:	Fredericton Express
John D. Chick Trophy; Regular Season champions, South Division:	Rochester Americans

Individual awards

Les Cunningham Award; Most valuable player:	Ross Yates - Binghamton Whalers
John B. Sollenberger Trophy; Top point scorer:	Ross Yates - Binghamton Whalers
Dudley "Red" Garrett Memorial Award; Rookie of the year:	Mitch Lamoureux - Baltimore Skipjacks
Eddie Shore Award; Defenceman of the year:	Greg Tebbutt - Baltimore Skipjacks
Harry "Hap" Holmes Memorial Award; Lowest goals against average:	Brian Ford & Clint Malarchuk - Fredericton Express
Louis A.R. Pieri Memorial Award; Coach of the year:	Jacques Demers - Fredericton Express
Fred T. Hunt Memorial Award; Sportsmanship / Perseverance:	Ross Yates - Binghamton Whalers

Other awards

James C. Hendy Memorial Award; Most outstanding executive:	George Bergantz
James H. Ellery Memorial Awards; Outstanding media coverage:	Mike Kane, Adirondack, (newspaper); Phil Wood, Baltimore, (radio); Tom Gagnon, Rochester, (television)
Ken McKenzie Award; Outstanding marketing executive:	Mike Doyle, Fredericton Express

== See also ==
- List of AHL seasons

Preceded by 1981–82 AHL season	AHL seasons	Succeeded by 1983–84 AHL season
