= Nova Scotia Voyageurs =

Former professional minor league ice hockey team in Halifax, Nova Scotia, Canada

- City: Halifax, Nova Scotia
- League: American Hockey League
- Operated: 1971–1984
- Home arena: Halifax Forum (1971–78); Halifax Metro Centre (1978–84)
- Colours: Red, white, blue
- Affiliates: Montreal Canadiens

Franchise history
- 1965–1969: Houston Apollos
- 1969–1971: Montreal Voyageurs
- 1971–1984: Nova Scotia Voyageurs
- 1984–1990: Sherbrooke Canadiens
- 1990–1999: Fredericton Canadiens
- 1999–2002: Quebec Citadelles
- 2002–2015: Hamilton Bulldogs
- 2015–2017: St. John's IceCaps
- 2017–present: Laval Rocket

Championships
- Regular season titles: 2: (1975–76, 1976–77)
- Division titles: 2: (1972–73, 1976–77)
- Calder Cups: 3: (1971–72, 1975–76, 1976–77)

The Nova Scotia Voyageurs were a professional ice hockey team, based in Halifax, Nova Scotia, Canada. They played in the American Hockey League, from 1971 to 1984. Originally chartered as the Omaha Knights of the Central Professional Hockey League before becoming the Houston Apollos of the Central Hockey League, the organization was relocated to Montreal after five seasons due to low attendance and travel costs. The Voyageurs (or "Vees" for short) played their first two seasons (1969–71), as the Montreal Voyageurs and were the affiliate of the National Hockey League's Montreal Canadiens.

In 1971, they relocated to Halifax, Nova Scotia. They were the first AHL team to be located in Atlantic Canada, and would be the first to play in the Halifax Metro Centre. The team was also the first Canadian club to win the Calder Cup, and were the class of the league for many years - only in two seasons did the team garner a losing record, and the Voyageurs never missed the playoffs. The team eventually moved to Sherbrooke, Quebec to become the Sherbrooke Canadiens.

The Vees won three Calder Cups, the first in 1972. Nova Scotia won again in 1976 and 1977, while their parent Canadiens were winning back-to-back Stanley Cups; this is the only time an NHL/AHL affiliated combo have won both Cups in the same year twice.

The team was replaced in Halifax by the Nova Scotia Oilers, an affiliate of the Edmonton Oilers and subsequently the Halifax Citadels, an affiliate of the Quebec Nordiques.

With the success of the Voyageurs in its existence of 13 seasons, it spawned a period of 34 consecutive years where there would be at least one AHL team in Atlantic Canada. This was largely due to the desire of several Canadian NHL franchises to continue to pay players sent down to the minors in Canadian dollars throughout the 1980s and 1990s. However, by the late 1990s, many of the remaining AHL teams in Atlantic Canada had disappeared, either by relocation or by the franchise being rendered dormant. The last remaining team in this long period would be the St. John's Maple Leafs, which moved from St. John's, Newfoundland and Labrador in 2005 to Toronto, Ontario to play as the Toronto Marlies. The AHL did not return to Atlantic Canada until 2011 with the St. John's IceCaps.

== Team records ==
Single Season
Goals: 52 (Canada) Yvon Lambert (1971–72)
Assists: 73 (Canada) John Chabot (1982–83)
Points: 104 (Canada) Yvon Lambert (1971–72), 104 (Canada) Peter Sullivan (1974–75)
Penalty Minutes: 335 (United States) Dwight Schofield (1981–82)
GAA:
SV%:
Career
Career Goals: 103, (Canada) Dan Metivier
Career Assists: 163, (Canada) Wayne Thompson
Career Points: 251, (Canada) Don Howse
Career Penalty Minutes: 1084, (Canada) Dave Allison
Career Goaltending Wins:
Career Shutouts:
Career Games: 371, Jim Cahoon

== Notable alumni ==
List of Voyageurs alumni that played more than 100 games in Halifax, and also played at least 100 games in the National Hockey League and/or World Hockey Association.

- Keith Acton
- Dave Allison
- Ron Andruff
- Jeff Brubaker
- Mike Busniuk
- Guy Carbonneau
- Dan Daoust
- Norm Dupont
- Brian Engblom
- Tony Featherstone
- Greg Fox
- Ed Gilbert
- Glenn Goldup
- Mark Holden
- Pat Hughes
- Yvon Lambert
- Peter Lee
- Craig Levie
- Dave Lumley
- Gilles Lupien
- Mike McPhee
- Rick Meagher
- Pierre Mondou
- Bob Murray
- Bill Nyrop
- Greg Paslawski
- Mike Polich
- Noel Price
- Bill Riley
- Larry Robinson
- Bill Root
- Randy Rota
- Rod Schutt
- Dwight Schofield
- Peter Sullivan
- Michel Therrien
- John Van Boxmeer
- Rick Wilson
- Ron Wilson
- Paul Woods

== Coaches ==
- Al MacNeil - 1971–72 to 1976–77
- Frank St. Marseille - 1977–78 to 1978–79
- Bert Templeton - 1979–80 to 1980–81
- John Brophy - 1981–82 to 1983–84

== Season-by-season results ==
- Montreal Voyageurs 1969–1971
- Nova Scotia Voyageurs 1971–1984

=== Regular season ===
Season	Games	Won	Lost	Tied	Points	Goals for	Goals against	Standing
1969–70	72	43	15	14	100	327	195	1st, East
1970–71	72	27	31	14	68	215	239	2nd, East
1971–72	76	41	21	14	96	274	202	2nd, East
1972–73	76	43	18	15	101	316	191	1st, East
1973–74	76	37	27	12	86	263	223	3rd, North
1974–75	75	40	26	9	89	270	227	3rd, North
1975–76	76	48	20	8	104	326	209	1st, North
1976–77	80	52	22	6	110	308	225	1st, AHL
1977–78	81	37	28	16	90	304	250	2nd, North
1978–79	80	39	37	4	82	313	302	3rd, North
1979–80	79	43	29	7	93	331	271	2nd, North
1980–81	80	38	37	5	81	335	298	3rd, North
1981–82	80	35	35	10	80	330	313	3rd, North
1982–83	80	41	34	5	87	378	333	2nd, North
1983–84	80	32	37	11	75	277	288	4th, North

=== Playoffs ===
Season	1st round	2nd round	Finals
1969–70	W, 4–1, BALT	L, R-R vs.BUF & SPR	—
1970–71	L, 0–3, SPR	—	—
1971–72	W, 4–1, SPR	W, 4–0, BOS	W, 4–2, BALT
1972–73	W, 4–0, PROV	W, 4–0, BOS	L, 1–4, CIN
1973–74	L, 2–4, PROV	—	—
1974–75	L, 2–4, ROCH	—	—
1975–76	bye	W, 4–0, ROCH	W, 4–1, HER
1976–77	W, 4–2, HER	—	W, 4–2, ROCH
1977–78	W, 3–1, SPR	L, 3–4, MAI	—
1978–79	W, 3–2, NB	L, 2–4, MAI	—
1979–80	L, 2–4, MAI	—	—
1980–81	L, 2–4, NB	—	—
1981–82	W, 3–1, MAI	L, 1–4, NB	—
1982–83	L, 3–4, MAI	—	—
1983–84	W, 4–3, FRED	L, 1–4, MAI	—

== See also ==
- List of ice hockey teams in Nova Scotia
- Sports teams in Halifax, Nova Scotia
