= Fredericton Express =

- City: Fredericton, New Brunswick, Canada
- League: American Hockey League
- Operated: 1981–1988
- Home arena: Aitken Centre
- Colors: Red, white, blue
- Affiliates: Quebec Nordiques; Vancouver Canucks

Franchise history
- 1981–1988: Fredericton Express
- 1988–1993: Halifax Citadels
- 1993–1996: Cornwall Aces
- 1999–present: Wilkes-Barre/Scranton Penguins

Championships
- Division titles: 2: (1982–83, 1983–84)

The Fredericton Express were a professional ice hockey team based in Fredericton, New Brunswick, Canada. They played in the American Hockey League between 1981 and 1988. The Express were affiliated with the Quebec Nordiques and Vancouver Canucks of the National Hockey League. Home games were played at the Aitken Centre on the University of New Brunswick campus.

After the Canucks hired Brian Burke as vice president and director of hockey operations in 1987, tensions between the joint ownership by the two teams were beginning to show. Burke visited Fredericton for the first time in October of that year. The previous season the Express had the second worst record in the AHL, and the team's top five scorers were all sent down by the Canucks.

Despite the internal conflict, in 1988 the Express played their best season yet, with a 42–21 win–loss record. The Express went on to play in the Calder Cup Finals, where they lost to the Hershey Bears, with a final score of 4–2. During the summer of that year, they moved to become the Halifax Citadels.

== Season-by-season results ==
=== Regular season ===
Season	Games	Won	Lost	Tied	OTL	Points	Goals for	Goals against	Standing
1981–82	80	20	55	5	—	45	275	408	5th, North
1982–83	80	45	27	8	—	98	348	284	1st, North
1983–84	80	45	30	5	—	95	340	262	1st, North
1984–85	80	36	36	8	—	80	279	301	2nd, North
1985–86	80	35	37	8	—	78	319	311	4th, North
1986–87	80	32	43	—	5	69	292	357	6th, North
1987–88	80	42	27	8	3	95	370	318	2nd, North

=== Playoffs ===
Season	1st round	2nd round	Finals
1981–82	Out of playoffs		
1982–83	W, 4–2, Adirondack	L, 2–4, Maine	—
1983–84	L, 3–4, Nova Scotia	—	—
1984–85	L, 2–4, Sherbrooke	—	—
1985–86	L, 2–4, Adirondack	—	—
1986–87	Out of playoffs		
1987–88	W, 4–2, Sherbrooke	W, 4–1, Maine	L, 0–4, Hershey

=== American Hockey League Hall of Famers ===
AHL Hall of Fame Honored Members
Name	Seasons	Induction Year
Tim Tookey	1981-83 (player)	2008
Wendell Young	1983-87 (player)	2026

== See also ==
- List of ice hockey teams in New Brunswick
