= Maine Mariners (AHL) =

Defunct American Hockey League franchise

- City: Portland, Maine
- League: American Hockey League
- Founded: 1977 (First franchise); 1987 (Second franchise)
- Operated: 1977–1987 (first franchise); 1987–1992 (second franchise)
- Home arena: Cumberland County Civic Center
- Colors: Orange, black Black, gold
- Affiliates: Philadelphia Flyers, New Jersey Devils, Boston Bruins

Franchise history
- First Franchise
- 1977–1987: Maine Mariners
- 1987–1993: Utica Devils
- 1993–2003: Saint John Flames
- 2005–2007: Omaha Ak-Sar-Ben Knights
- 2007–2009: Quad City Flames
- 2009–2014: Abbotsford Heat
- 2014–2015: Adirondack Flames
- 2015–2022: Stockton Heat
- 2022–Present: Calgary Wranglers
- Second Franchise
- 1987–1992: Maine Mariners
- 1992–present: Providence Bruins

Championships
- Regular season titles: three (1977–78, 1978–79), 1983–84
- Division titles: five (1977–78, 1978–79, 1980–81, 1984–85, 1987–88)
- Calder Cups: three (1977–78, 1978–79, 1983–84)

The Maine Mariners were a professional ice hockey team in the American Hockey League. They played in Portland, Maine, at the Cumberland County Civic Center. After the franchise was sold and moved to Utica, New York in 1987, a new expansion franchise assumed the Mariners' name, logo, and history beginning in the 1987-88 season.

== History ==
=== First franchise ===
Once the Cumberland County Civic Center began construction in 1976, there was discussion of the building hosting a minor league hockey franchise. Three franchises eventually made bids to play hockey in Portland: the World Hockey Association's Quebec Nordiques, the American Hockey League's Rhode Island Reds, and the National Hockey League's Philadelphia Flyers. The Nordiques, who already had a farm team in nearby Lewiston (the Maine Nordiques of the North American Hockey League), was considering supporting affiliates in Portland as well. Rhode Island, who were an established AHL franchise originally founded in 1926, didn't want to relocate to Portland, but instead proposed scheduling a dozen regular season games there. The Reds played the first AHL game at Cumberland County Civic Center, an 8–4 defeat to the Springfield Indians on March 6, 1977.

Philadelphia was the only franchise that wanted to utilize Portland as their team's sole top-level farm club, and in May 1977, the agreement to create the Maine Mariners was struck. It proved to be bad news for the Maine Nordiques, who ceased operations after the 1977 season, along with the rest of the NAHL.

The Mariners entered the league for the 1977–78 season with the Hampton Gulls and Philadelphia Firebirds. The Reds ultimately relocated to Binghamton, New York to become the Binghamton Dusters ahead of the 1977–78 season.

Bob McCammon was the Mariners' first head coach. The first regular season game in Mariners team history was played on October 14, 1977, a 5–1 loss on the road to the Philadelphia Firebirds at the Philadelphia Civic Center. The first home game in franchise history was played in front of 6,566 spectators at the Cumberland County Civic Center on October 15, 1977, against the Binghamton Dusters. Boston Red Sox outfielder Dwight Evans dropped the ceremonial opening faceoff.

The Mariners are the only franchise in league history to win the Calder Cup title in their first two seasons (1977–78, 1978–79) and at the time were the only team to ever capture the Calder Cup during their inaugural season. Later, the feat was matched by the team that brought AHL hockey back to Portland, the Portland Pirates. The Mariners defeated the New Haven Nighthawks in both the 1978 and 1979 Calder Cup Finals.

Maine returned to the Calder Cup final in 1980–81 and first-year goaltender Pelle Lindbergh became the only goaltender in AHL history, and just the third player ever, to win the AHL regular season MVP and AHL outstanding rookie award in the same season. Bob McCammon won his second AHL coach of the year award. The Mariners would ultimately lose the Calder Cup to the Adirondack Red Wings, two games to four. The Mariners would return to the Calder Cup Finals in 1983, being swept by the Rochester Americans.

Ahead of the 1983–84 season, the Flyers sold the Mariners to the New Jersey Devils of the NHL. However, the team kept the Flyers' colors of orange, black and white rather than switch to the Devils' red, green and white. The same season, Maine became only the fourth team in AHL history to win a Calder Cup title with a losing regular season record, finishing the regular season 33–36–11. The Mariners defeated the Rochester Americans in a rematch of the previous year's finals, four games to one. It was the Mariners' third Calder Cup crown and their fifth finals appearance in seven years. Maine's championship year was truly a team effort as no members of the club made the all-star team, won a league award during the regular season, or placed in the regular season top ten in scoring. Bud Stefanski was the first recipient of the new AHL playoff MVP award.

=== Second franchise ===
Following the 1986–87 season, the Devils moved the original Mariners franchise to Utica, New York, as the Utica Devils. However, Portland was not without hockey, as the league approved an expansion team supplied by players from the Boston Bruins, with Bruins general manager Harry Sinden travelling to Portland for the announcement. The expansion team assumed the Mariners name, logo, and history and took on the Bruins' black-gold-white scheme. Following the 1991–92 season, after five seasons in Portland, the Mariners franchise was moved to Providence, Rhode Island, and renamed the Providence Bruins. The team had made the playoffs just twice under Bruins ownership, and had finished fifth in the North Division for four consecutive seasons. Team president Ed Anderson said that the team was losing at least 250 season ticket holders a year over the preceding four years, and had lost $500,000 since the second franchise entered the AHL. The team was also dissatisfied with its lease agreement at the Cumberland County Civic Center. The final Mariners game took place on April 4, 1992, at the Cumberland County Civic Center, a 12–1 defeat to the Fredericton Canadiens.

Portland was not without AHL hockey for long; a season later, the Baltimore Skipjacks relocated to Portland to become the Portland Pirates. The Pirates played in Maine until 2016, (Note: While the Pirates' home arena was the Cumberland County Civic Center, due to renovations at the Civic Center and a lease dispute between the team and county, the Pirates played the 2013–14 and 2014–15 seasons at the Androscoggin Bank Colisée in Lewiston, Maine.) when the franchise was relocated to Springfield, Massachusetts to become the Springfield Thunderbirds.

The Maine Mariners name is currently being used by an ECHL team that has played in Portland since 2018.

This market has also been served by:

- Maine Nordiques (NAHL) (1973–1977)
- Portland Pirates (1993–2016)
- Maine Mariners (ECHL) (2018–present)

== Season-by-season results ==
=== Regular season ===
Season	Games	Won	Lost	Tied	OTL	Points	Goals for	Goals against	Standing
1977–78	80	43	28	9	—	95	305	256	1st, North
1978–79	80	45	22	13	—	103	350	252	1st, North
1979–80	80	41	28	11	—	93	307	266	3rd, North
1980–81	80	45	28	7	—	97	319	292	1st, North
1981–82	80	47	26	7	—	101	325	272	2nd, North
1982–83	80	39	33	8	—	86	342	309	3rd, North
1983–84	80	33	36	11	—	77	310	312	3rd, North
1984–85	80	38	32	10	—	86	296	266	1st, North
1985–86	80	40	31	9	—	89	274	285	2nd, North
1986–87	80	35	40	—	5	75	272	298	5th, North
1987–88	80	44	25	7	4	99	308	284	1st, North
1988–89	80	32	40	8	—	72	262	317	5th, North
1989–90	80	31	38	11	—	73	294	317	5th, North
1990–91	80	34	34	12	—	80	269	284	5th, North
1991–92	80	23	47	10	—	56	296	352	5th, North

=== Playoffs ===
Season	Prelim	1st round	2nd round	Finals
1977–78	—	bye	W, 4–3, NS	W, 4–1, NH
1978–79	—	bye	W, 4–2, NS	W, 4–0, NH
1979–80	—	W, 4–2, NS	L, 2–4, NB	—
1980–81	—	W, 4–3, SPR	W, 4–3, NB	L, 2–4, ADIR
1981–82	—	L, 1–3, NS	—	—
1982–83	—	W, 4–3, NS	W, 4–2, FRED	L, 0–4, ROCH
1983–84	—	W, 4–3, ADIR	W, 4–1, NS	W, 4–1, ROCH
1984–85	—	W, 4–2, NS	L, 1–4, SHER	—
1985–86	—	L, 1–4, MONC	—	—
1986–87	Out of playoffs.			
1987–88	—	W, 4–1, NS	L, 1–4, FRED	—
1988–89	Out of playoffs.			
1989–90	Out of playoffs.			
1990–91	L, 7–12, FRED ^{†}	—	—	—
1991–92	Out of playoffs.			

^{†} Two game combined total goals series.

== Notable players ==
- Brian Burke — 2006–07 Stanley Cup Champion while General Manager of the Anaheim Ducks.
- Ken Daneyko — Three-time Stanley Cup champion, 2000 Bill Masterton Trophy winner, 1,283 NHL games played with the New Jersey Devils.
- Ken Linseman — Went on to play 860 NHL games, 1983–84 Stanley Cup Winner with the Edmonton Oilers.
- Pete Peeters — Went on to play 489 NHL games and won the Vezina Trophy for the 1982–83 season.
- Alain Vigneault — Longtime NHL head coach. Won the Jack Adams Award as coach of the year with the Vancouver Canucks in 2006–07.

=== American Hockey League Hall of Famers ===
AHL Hall of Fame Honored Members
Name	Seasons	Induction Year
Gordie Clark	1978-83 (player); 1987-89 (asst. coach)	2024
Mitch Lamoureux	1989-90 (player)	2011
Glenn Merkosky	1983-85 (player)	2018
John Paddock	1977-79, 1980-84 (player); 1983-85 (coach)	2010
Roy Sommer	1983-85 (player)	2024
Jim Wiemer	1989-90, 1991-92 (player)	2026
