= Nova Scotia Oilers =

- City: Halifax, Nova Scotia
- League: American Hockey League
- Operated: 1984–1988
- Home arena: Halifax Metro Centre
- Colors: Blue, white, orange
- Affiliates: Edmonton Oilers

Franchise history
- 1984–1988: Nova Scotia Oilers
- 1988–1996: Cape Breton Oilers
- 1996–2003: Hamilton Bulldogs
- 2003–2004: Toronto Roadrunners
- 2004–2005: Edmonton Road Runners
- 2010–2015: Oklahoma City Barons
- 2015–present: Bakersfield Condors

The Nova Scotia Oilers were a minor professional ice hockey team in the American Hockey League based in Halifax, Nova Scotia from 1984 to 1988. The Oilers played their home games at the Halifax Metro Centre, and were the AHL affiliate of the Edmonton Oilers, whose logo theirs resembled.

The Oilers played four seasons before moving on. Larry Kish coached the first three seasons, followed by Ron Low in the fourth season. After the 1987–88 season, the team was relocated to Sydney, Nova Scotia becoming the Cape Breton Oilers. The void the Oilers left in Halifax was filled by the Halifax Citadels.

== Season-by-season results ==
Regular season

Season	Games	Won	Lost	Tied	OTL	Points	Goals for	Goals against	Standing
1984–85	80	36	37	7	—	79	292	295	4th, North
1985–86	80	29	43	8	—	66	314	353	6th, North
1986–87	80	38	39	—	3	79	318	315	4th, North
1987–88	80	35	34	9	2	81	323	343	4th, North

Playoffs

Season	1st round	2nd round	Finals
1984–85	L, 2–4, Maine	—	—
1985–86	Out of Playoffs		
1986–87	L, 1–4, Sherbrooke	—	—
1987–88	L, 1–4, Maine	—	—

== Notable alumni ==
List of Nova Scotia Oilers alumni who played more than 100 games in Nova Scotia and 100 or more games in the National Hockey League.

- Bruce Boudreau
- Kelly Buchberger
- Dean Hopkins
- Mike Moller
- Jim Wiemer

=== American Hockey League Hall of Famers ===
AHL Hall of Fame Honored Members
Name	Seasons	Induction Year
David Andrews	1987-88 (general manager)	2021
Don Biggs	1985-87 (player)	2018
Bruce Boudreau	1985-87 (player)	2009
Murray Eaves	1986-87 (player)	2019
Jim Wiemer	1986-88 (player)	2026

== See also ==
- List of ice hockey teams in Nova Scotia
- Sports teams in Halifax, Nova Scotia
