= Sherbrooke Canadiens =

Canadian ice hockey team

- City: Sherbrooke, Quebec
- League: American Hockey League
- Operated: 1984–1990
- Home arena: Palais des Sports
- Colours: Red, white, blue
- Affiliates: Montreal Canadiens

Franchise history
- 1969–1971: Montreal Voyageurs
- 1971–1984: Nova Scotia Voyageurs
- 1984–1990: Sherbrooke Canadiens
- 1990–1999: Fredericton Canadiens
- 1999–2002: Quebec Citadelles
- 2002–2015: Hamilton Bulldogs
- 2015–2017: St. John's IceCaps
- 2017–present: Laval Rocket

Championships
- Regular season titles: 3: 1986–87, 1988–89, 1989–90
- Division titles: 3: 1986–87, 1988–89, 1989–90
- Calder Cups: 1: 1984–85

The Sherbrooke Canadiens were a professional ice hockey team in Sherbrooke, Quebec, Canada. They played their home games at the Palais des Sports. They were a member of the American Hockey League from 1984 to 1990, and were a farm team of the Montreal Canadiens.

The team had been the Nova Scotia Voyageurs before 1984, and subsequently moved to Fredericton, New Brunswick as the Fredericton Canadiens.

The team won the Calder Cup in 1985, beating the Baltimore Skipjacks in six games behind the goaltending of a young Patrick Roy.

== Regular season ==
Season	Games	Won	Lost	Tied	OTL	Points	Goals for	Goals against	Standing
1984–85	80	37	38	5	—	79	323	329	3rd, North
1985–86	80	33	38	9	—	75	340	341	5th, North
1986–87	80	50	28	2	—	102	328	257	1st, North
1987–88	80	42	33	4	1	89	316	243	3rd, North
1988–89	80	47	24	9	—	103	348	261	1st, North
1989–90	80	45	23	12	—	102	301	247	1st, North

== Playoffs ==
Season	1st round	2nd round	Finals
1984–85	W, 4–2, Fredericton	W, 4–1, Maine	W, 4–2, Baltimore
1985–86	Out of playoffs		
1986–87	W, 4–1, Nova Scotia	W, 4–1, Adirondack	L, 3–4, Rochester
1987–88	L, 2–4, Fredericton	—	—
1988–89	L, 2–4, New Haven	—	—
1989–90	W, 4–2, Halifax	L, 2–4, Springfield	—
