= Binghamton Whalers =

- City: Binghamton, New York
- League: American Hockey League
- Operated: 1980–1990
- Home arena: Broome County Veterans Memorial Arena
- Colors: Green and blue
- Affiliates: Washington Capitals; Hartford Whalers

Franchise history
- 1926–1976: Providence Reds
- 1976–1977: Rhode Island Reds
- 1977–1980: Binghamton Dusters
- 1980–1990: Binghamton Whalers
- 1990–1997: Binghamton Rangers
- 1997–2010, 2013-present: Hartford Wolf Pack
- 2010–2013: Connecticut Whale

Championships
- Regular season titles: one (1984–85)
- Division titles: two (1981–82, 1984–85)

The Binghamton Whalers were an ice hockey team in the American Hockey League, playing in Binghamton, New York, United States, at the Broome County Veterans Memorial Arena.

== History ==
The Whalers were generally a successful team, making the playoffs seven times and advancing all the way to the Calder Cup Finals in 1982. However, in 1989–90, they turned in a record of 11–60–9, worst in the league. The .194 winning percentage was the worst in AHL history at the time. The Whalers moved their affiliation to Springfield the next season, where the seven remaining players from the disastrous 1990 Binghamton season helped the Indians to their seventh and final Calder Cup championship.

The market was previously served by:

Broome Dusters of the NAHL (1973–1977)

The market was subsequently home to:

Binghamton Rangers of the AHL (1990–1997)
B.C. Icemen of the UHL (1997–2002)
Binghamton Senators of the AHL (2002–2017)
Binghamton Devils of the AHL (2017–2021)
Binghamton Black Bears of the Federal Prospects Hockey League (FPHL) (2021–present)

== Team identity ==
The Binghamton Whalers' logo was simply the Hartford Whalers' logo turned onto its side. The curvature along the inside of the "W" was altered to more closely resemble the letter B, for the team's home city.

During home games, the song "Brass Bonanza" would play when the Whalers scored a goal, a practice adopted from the Hartford Whalers.

== Season-by-season results ==
=== Regular season ===
Season	Games	Won	Lost	Tied	OTL	Points	Goals for	Goals against	Standing
1980–81	80	32	42	6	—	70	296	336	3rd, South
1981–82	80	46	28	6	—	98	329	266	1st, South
1982–83	80	36	36	8	—	80	320	333	4th, South
1983–84	80	33	43	4	—	70	359	388	6th, South
1984–85	80	52	20	8	—	112	388	265	1st, South
1985–86	80	41	34	5	—	87	316	290	2nd, South
1986–87	80	47	26	—	7	101	309	259	2nd, South
1987–88	80	38	31	8	3	87	353	300	4th, South
1988–89	80	28	46	6	—	62	307	392	7th, South
1989–90	80	11	60	9	—	31	229	366	7th, South

=== Playoffs ===
Season	1st round	2nd round	Finals
1980–81	L, 2–4, Adirondack	—	—
1981–82	W, 3–2, Hershey	W, 4–1, Rochester	L, 1–4, New Brunswick
1982–83	L, 1–4, Rochester	—	—
1983–84	Out of Playoffs		
1984–85	W, 4–0, Springfield	L, 0–4, Baltimore	—
1985–86	L, 2–4, St. Catharines	—	—
1986–87	W, 4–3, New Haven	L, 2–4, Rochester	—
1987–88	L, 0–4, Hershey	—	—
1988–89	Out of Playoffs		
1989–90	Out of Playoffs		

== Team records ==
=== Single season ===
Goals: 53 Paul Fenton (United States) (1985–86)
Assists: 84 Ross Yates (Canada) (1982–83)
Points: 130 Paul Gardner (Canada) (1984–85)
Penalty minutes: 360 Jim Thomson (Canada) (1986–87)
GAA: 2.92 Peter Sidorkiewicz (Poland) (1986–87)
SV%: .901 Peter Sidorkiewicz (Poland) (1984–85)

=== Career ===
Career goals: 120 Paul Fenton (United States)
Career assists: 181 Ross Yates (Canada)
Career points: 283 Ross Yates (Canada)
Career penalty minutes: 723 Shane Churla (Canada)
Career goaltending wins: 94 Peter Sidorkiewicz (Poland)
Career shutouts: 9 Peter Sidorkiewicz (Poland)
Career games: 273 Dallas Gaume (Canada)

=== American Hockey League Hall of Famers ===
AHL Hall of Fame Honored Members
Name	Seasons	Induction Year
John Anderson	1989-90 (player)	2019
Glenn Merkosky	1980-82 (player)	2018
