= List of Washington Capitals players =

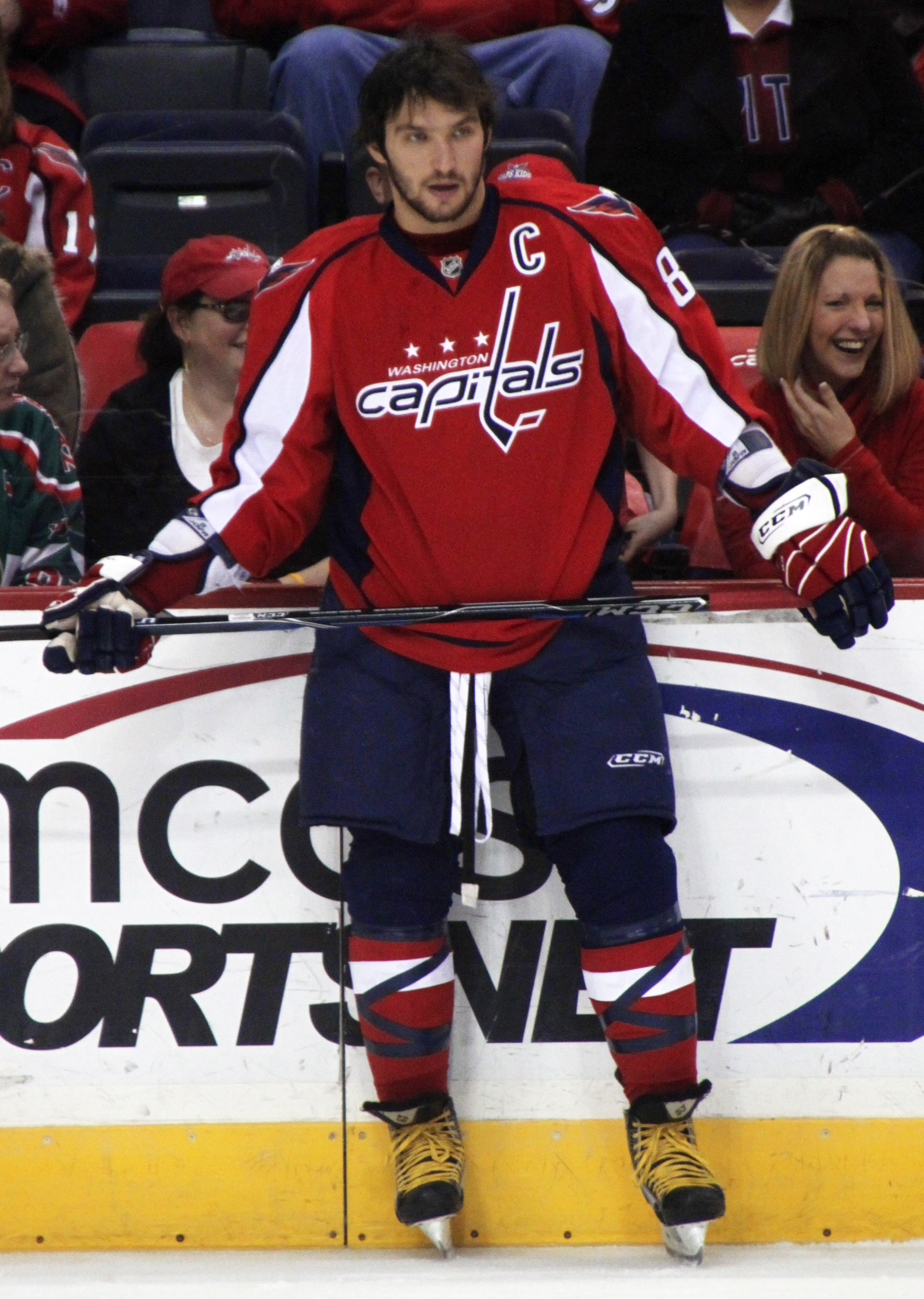
Alexander Ovechkin, current captain of the Capitals

This is a complete list of ice hockey players who have played for the Washington Capitals in the National Hockey League (NHL). It includes players who have played at least one game, either in the NHL regular season or in the NHL playoffs.

As of July 2018, 46 goaltenders and 536 skaters (forwards and defensemen) have appeared in at least one regular-season or playoff game with the Washington Capitals since the team joined the league in the 1974–75 NHL season. The 582 all-time members of the Capitals are listed below.

Eight former Washington Capitals players are enshrined in the Hockey Hall of Fame: Dino Ciccarelli, Adam Oates, Mike Gartner, Rod Langway, Larry Murphy, Scott Stevens, Phil Housley, and Sergei Fedorov. Jim Carey and Olaf Kolzig won the Vezina Trophy as the NHL's top goaltender while playing for Washington. Kolzig also won the King Clancy Memorial Trophy. Alexander Ovechkin won the Calder Memorial Trophy as NHL rookie of the year while playing for the Capitals. Doug Jarvis won the Frank J. Selke Trophy as the NHL's best defensive forward. Rod Langway won the James Norris Memorial Trophy, which is awarded to the League's top overall defenseman.

== Key ==
- * Appeared in a Capitals game during the 2025–2026 season.
- † Hockey Hall of Fame member, Stanley Cup champion, or retired number.

Abbreviations
GP	Games played
HHOF	Elected to the Hockey Hall of Fame
C	Captain
AR	Art Ross Trophy
CT	Calder Trophy
HT	Hart Trophy
JT	Jennings Trophy
MT	Masterton Trophy
NT	Norris Trophy
RT	Rocket Richard Trophy
ST	Selke Trophy
TL	Ted Lindsay Award
VT	Vezina Trophy
CS	Conn Smythe Trophy

Goaltenders
W	Wins
SO	Shutouts
L	Losses
GAA	Goals against average
T	Ties
OTL ^{a}	Overtime losses
SV%	Save percentage

Skaters
Pos	Position
RW	Right wing
A	Assists
D	Defenseman
C	Center
P	Points
LW	Left wing
G	Goals
PIM	Penalty minutes

The "seasons" column lists the first year of the season of the player's first game and the last year of the season of the player's last game. For example, a player who played one game in the 2000–01 season would be listed as playing with the team from 2000–2001, regardless of what calendar year the game occurred within.

Statistics complete as of the end of the 2026 Stanley Cup playoffs

== Goaltenders ==
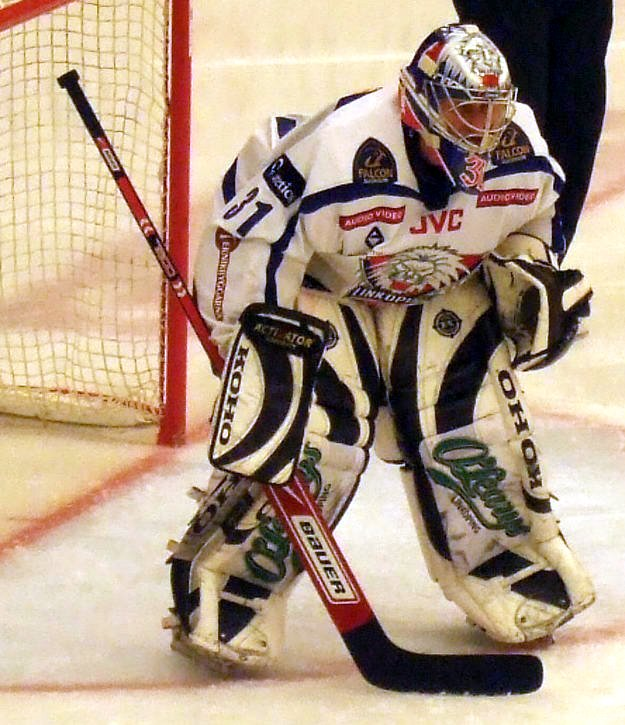
Rastislav Stana was drafted by Washington in the 1998 NHL entry draft and played for the Capitals from 2003 to 2004.

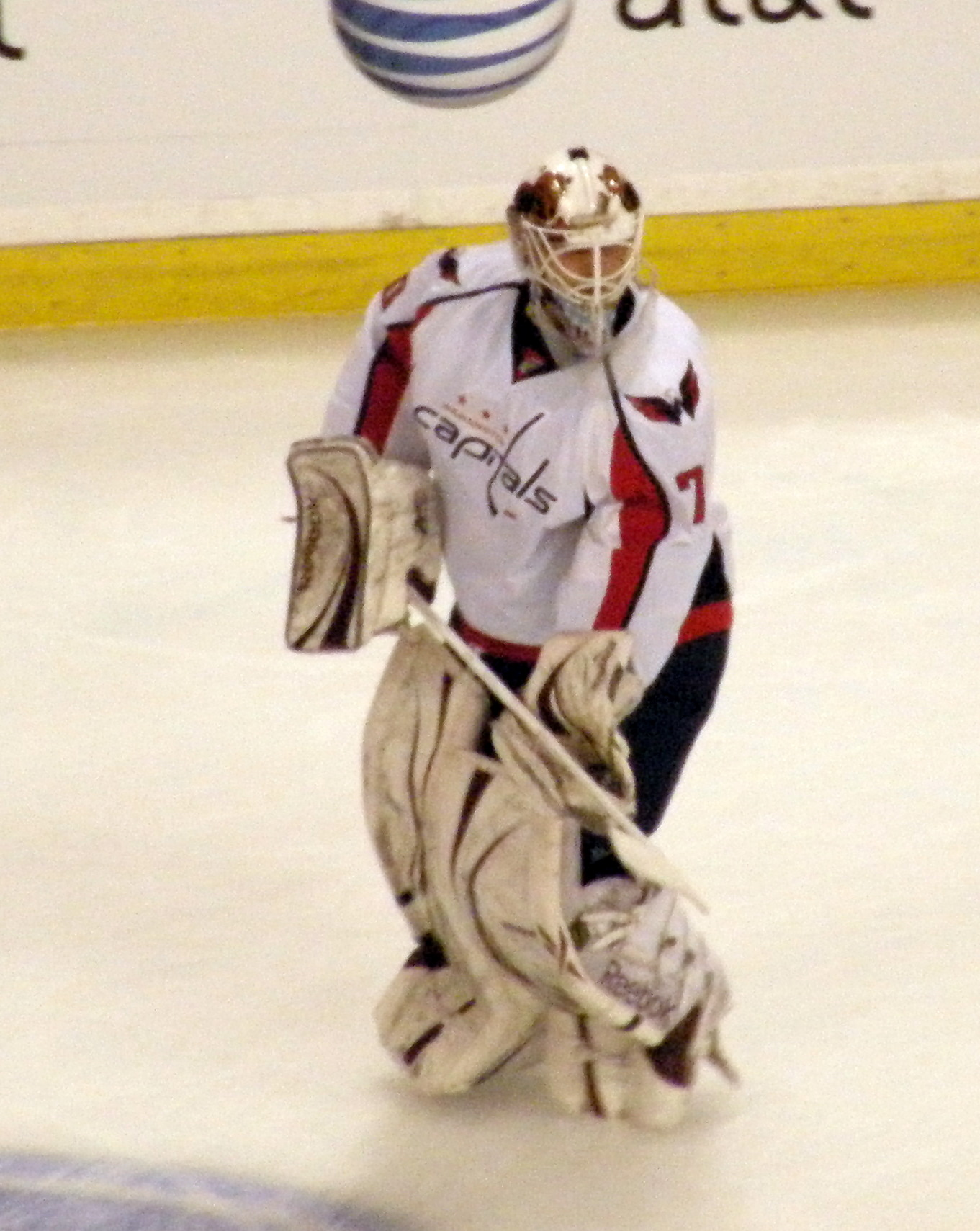
Braden Holtby played 14 playoff games for Washington, posting a 1.95 GAA in 2012.

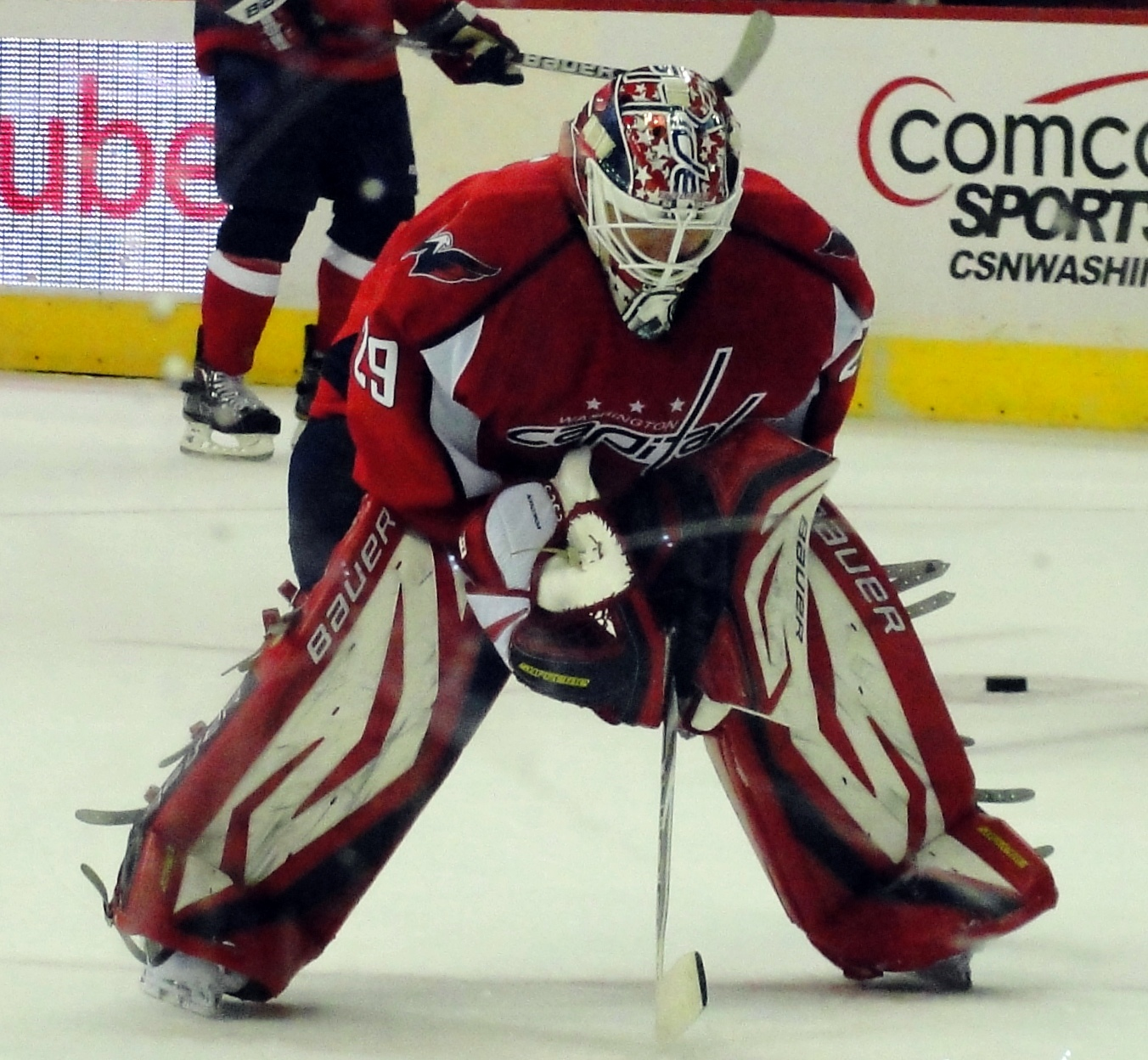
Tomas Vokoun appeared in 48 games during his one season in Washington.

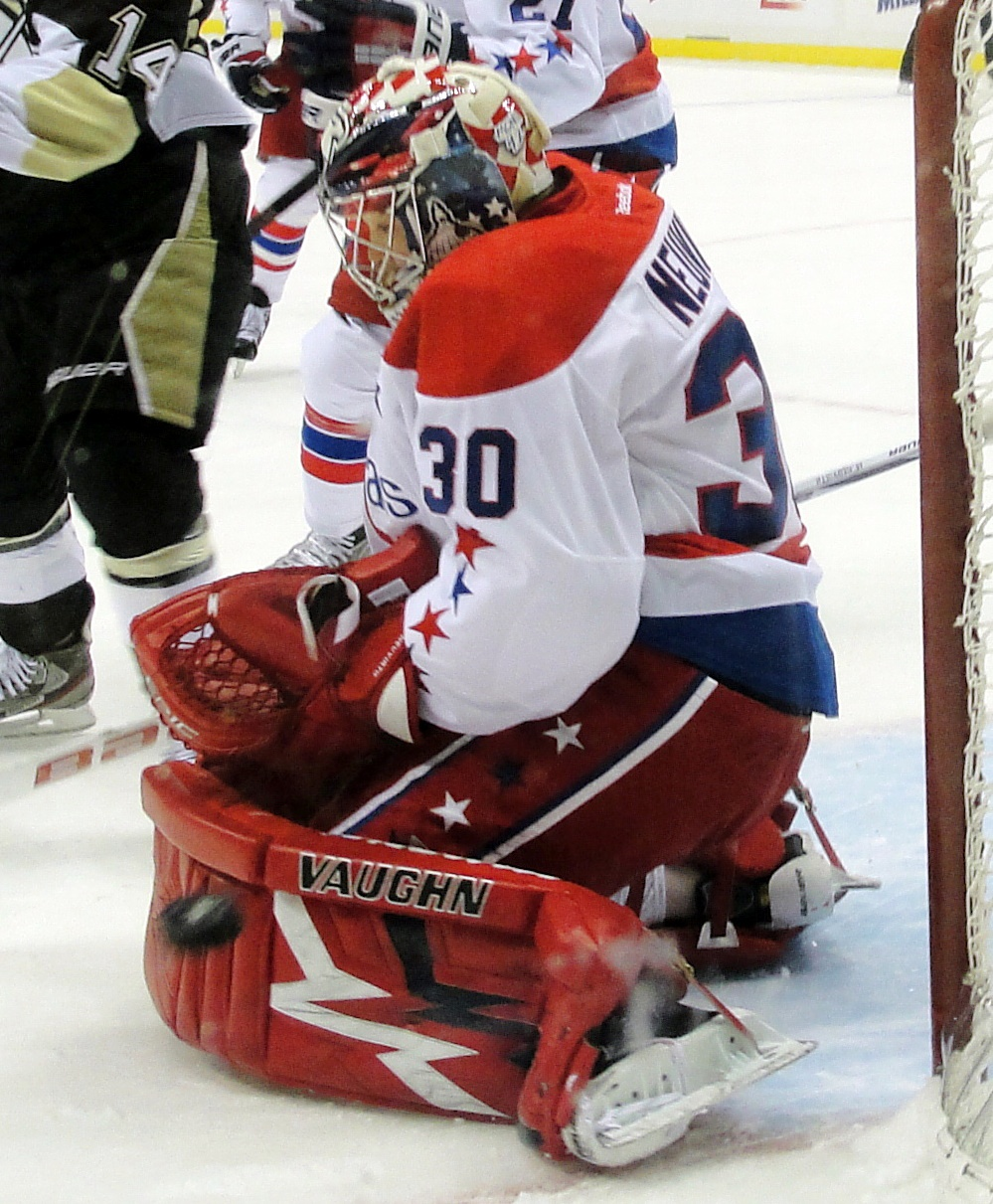
Michal Neuvirth has played in over 100 games for the Capitals.

Name	Nat.	Seasons	GP	W	L	T	OTL	SO	GAA	SV%	GP	W	L	SO	GAA	SV%	Notes
Name	Nat.	Seasons	Regular-season								Playoffs						
Adams, John	(Canada)	1974–1975	8	0	7	0	—	0	6.90	—	—	—	—	—	—	—	
Anderson, Craig	(United States)	2020–2021	4	2	1	—	0	0	2.13	.915	2	1	1	0	2.67	.929	
Beaupre, Don	(Canada)	1988–1994	269	128	96	27	6	12	3.05	.886	36	18	15	2	2.98	.896	
Bedard, Jim	(Canada)	1977–1979	73	17	40	13	—	1	3.94	—	—	—	—	—	—	—	
Belhumeur, Michel	(Canada)	1974–1976	42	0	29	4	—	0	5.32	—	—	—	—	—	—	—	
Billington, Craig	(Canada)	1999–2003	47	11	19	7	1	2	2.94	.894	1	0	0	0	3.00	.833	
Boutin, Rollie	(Canada)	1978–1981	22	7	10	1	—	0	3.96	—	—	—	—	—	—	—	
Brochu, Martin	(Canada)	1998–1999	2	0	2	0	0	0	3.00	.891	—	—	—	—	—	—	
Carey, Jim	(United States)	1994–1997	139	70	48	15	4	14	2.37	.904	10	2	5	0	4.61	.816	VT, 1996
Cassivi, Frederic	(Canada)	2005–2007	5	0	2	0	1	0	3.04	.886	—	—	—	—	—	—	
Charpentier, Sebastien	(Canada)	2001–2004	26	6	14	1	3	0	2.93	.902	—	—	—	—	—	—	
Copley, Pheonix	(United States)	2018–2019	27	16	7	—	3	1	2.90	.905	—	—	—	—	—	—	
Crozier, Roger	(Canada)	1976–1977	3	1	0	0	—	0	1.17	—	—	—	—	—	—	—	
Dafoe, Byron	(Canada)	1992–1995	10	3	3	1	0	0	3.45	.867	3	0	2	0	2.61	.857	
Fucale, Zach	(Canada)	2021-2022	4	1	1	—	1	1	1.75	.924	—	—	—	—	—	—	
Grubauer, Philipp^{†}	(Germany)	2012–2018	101	43	31	—	11	6	2.29	.923	4	1	2	0	4.24	.835	SC 2018
Halak, Jaroslav	(Slovakia)	2013–2014	12	5	4	—	3	1	2.31	.930	—	—	—	—	—	—	
Hirsch, Corey	(Canada)	2000–2001	1	1	0	0	—	0	0.00	1.000	—	—	—	—	—	—	
Holtby, Braden^{†}	(Canada)	2010–2020	468	282	122	—	46	35	2.53	.916	97	50	47	7	2.13	.926	SC 2018
Hrivnak, Jim	(Canada)	1989–1993	59	28	19	3	1	0	3.52	.877	—	—	—	—	—	—	
Huet, Cristobal	(France)	2007–2008	13	11	2	—	0	2	1.63	.936	7	3	4	0	2.93	.909	
Inness, Gary	(Canada)	1978–1981	54	16	24	12	—	0	3.64	—	—	—	—	—	—	—	
Jensen, Al	(Canada)	1981–1987	173	94	48	18	—	8	3.26	—	12	5	5	0	3.21	—	JT, 1984
Johnson, Brent	(United States)	2005–2009	96	34	41	—	12	1	3.21	.901	—	—	—	—	—	—	
Kolzig, Olaf	(Germany)	1989–2008	711	301	293	63	38	35	2.70	.906	45	20	24	6	2.14	.927	VT, 2000
Kuemper, Darcy	(Canada)	2022–2024	90	35	40	—	10	6	3.03	.902	—	—	—	—	—	—	
Lindgren, Charlie*	(United States)	2022–Present	141	67	49	—	16	8	2.90	.899	5	0	4	0	3.73	.861	
Liut, Mike	(Canada)	1989–1992	64	27	27	5	1	2	3.51	.871	11	4	5	0	3.46	.873	
Low, Ron	(Canada)	1974–1977	145	30	94	9	—	1	4.86	—	—	—	—	—	—	—	
Malarchuk, Clint	(Canada)	1987–1989	96	40	38	11	7	5	3.31	.881	4	0	2	0	4.65	.842	
Mason, Bob	(United States)	1983–1987; 1989–1990	76	35	29	7	7	—	1	3.16	—	4	2	1	1.75	—	
Moore, Robbie	(Canada)	1982–1983	1	0	1	0	—	3.00	—	—	—	—	—	—	—	—	
Neuvirth, Michal	(Czech Republic)	2008–2014	134	59	41	—	13	7	2.76	.908	9	4	5	1	2.34	.912	
Ouellet, Maxime	(Canada)	2003–2004	6	2	3	1	0	1	3.12	.910	—	—	—	—	—	—	
Palmateer, Mike	(Canada)	1980–1982	60	20	26	11	—	2	4.03	—	—	—	—	—	—	—	
Parro, Dave	(Canada)	1980–1984	77	21	36	10	—	2	4.09	—	—	—	—	—	—	—	
Peters, Justin	(Canada)	2014–2016	12	3	6	—	1	0	3.25	.881	—	—	—	—	—	—	
Peeters, Pete	(Canada)	1985–1989	139	70	41	15	1	7	3.06	—	30	15	15	0	3.15	—	
Ranford, Bill	(Canada)	1996–1998	40	15	19	4	—	0	2.76	.896	—	—	—	—	—	—	
Raymond, Alain	(Canada)	1987–1988	1	0	1	0	—	0	3.06	.900	—	—	—	—	—	—	
Riggin, Pat	(Canada)	1982–1986	143	67	46	19	—	6	3.02	—	10	2	5	0	2.91	—	JT, 1984
Rosati, Mike	(Canada)	1998–1999	1	1	0	0	—	0.00	1.000	—	—	—	—	—	—	—	
Samsonov, Ilya	(Russia)	2019–2022	45	29	10	—	3	3	2.61	.908	3	0	3	0	2.99	.899	
Shepard, Hunter	(United States)	2023–2025	5	2	2	—	1	0	3.94	.866	—	—	—	—	—	—	
Smith, Gary	(United States)	1977–1978	17	2	12	3	—	0	4.16	—	—	—	—	—	—	—	
Stana, Rastislav	(Slovakia)	2003–2004	6	1	2	0	—	0	3.13	.890	—	—	—	—	—	—	
Stephenson, Wayne	(Canada)	1979–1981	76	22	31	15	—	1	3.65	—	—	—	—	—	—	—	
Stevenson, Clay*	(Canada)	2024–Present	5	3	2	—	0	0	2.60	.906	—	—	—	—	—	—	
Tabaracci, Rick	(Canada)	1992–1995; 1998–1999	69	21	31	7	—	6	2.71	.899	6	1	5	0	2.89	.905	
Theodore, Jose	(Canada)	2009–2010	104	62	24	—	12	3	2.84	.905	4	0	2	0	3.71	.849	MT, 2010
Thompson, Logan*	(Canada)	2024–Present	101	62	27	—	12	6	2.46	.911	10	5	5	0	2.41	.917	
Vanecek, Vitek	(Czech Republic)	2020–2022	37	21	10	—	4	2	2.69	.908	1	0	0	0	4.56	.750	
Varlamov, Semyon	(Russia)	2008–2011	59	30	13	—	12	4	2.39	.917	19	10	9	2	2.49	.915	
Vokoun, Tomas	(Czech Republic)	2011–2012	48	25	17	—	2	4	2.51	.917	—	—	—	—	—	—	
Wolfe, Bernie	(Canada)	1975–1979	120	20	61	21	—	1	4.17	—	—	—	—	—	—	—	
Yeats, Matthew	(Canada)	2003–2004	5	1	—	3	0	3.03	.908	—	—	—	—	—	—	—	

== Skaters ==
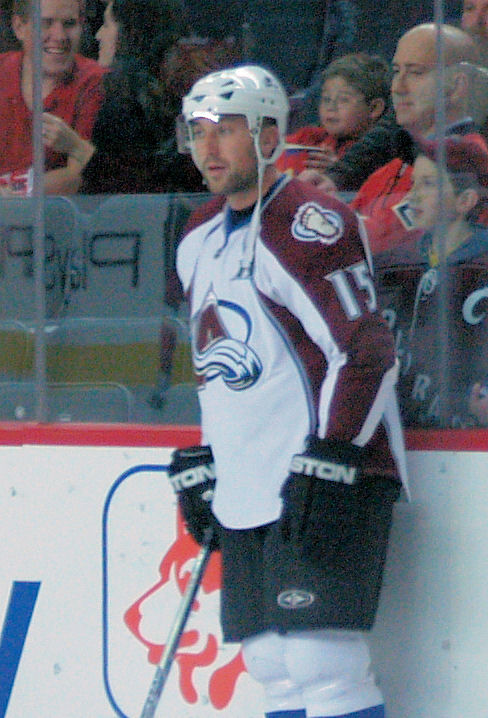
Andrew Brunette was drafted by Washington in the 1993 NHL entry draft and played for the Capitals from 1995 to 1998.

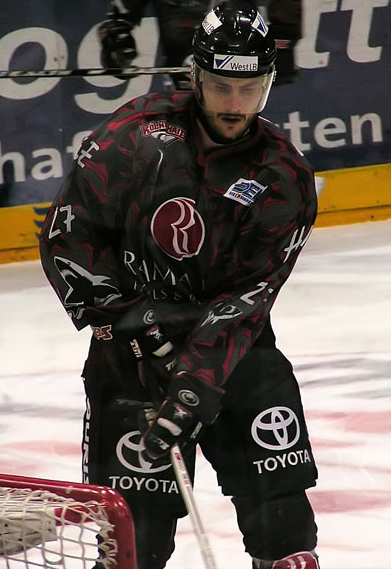
Ivan Ciernik played for the Capitals from 2001 to 2004.

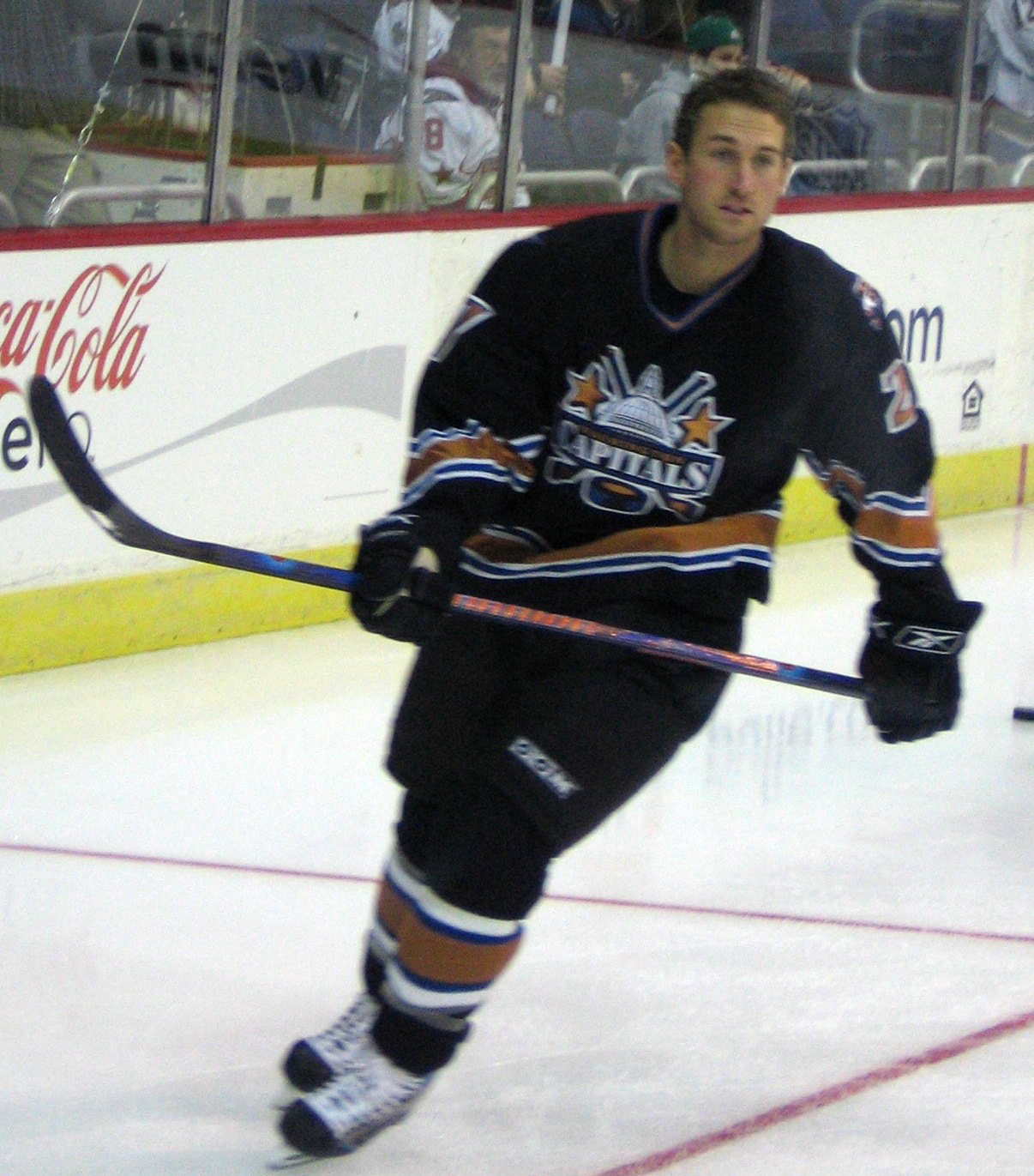
Ben Clymer played for the Capitals from 2005 to 2007.

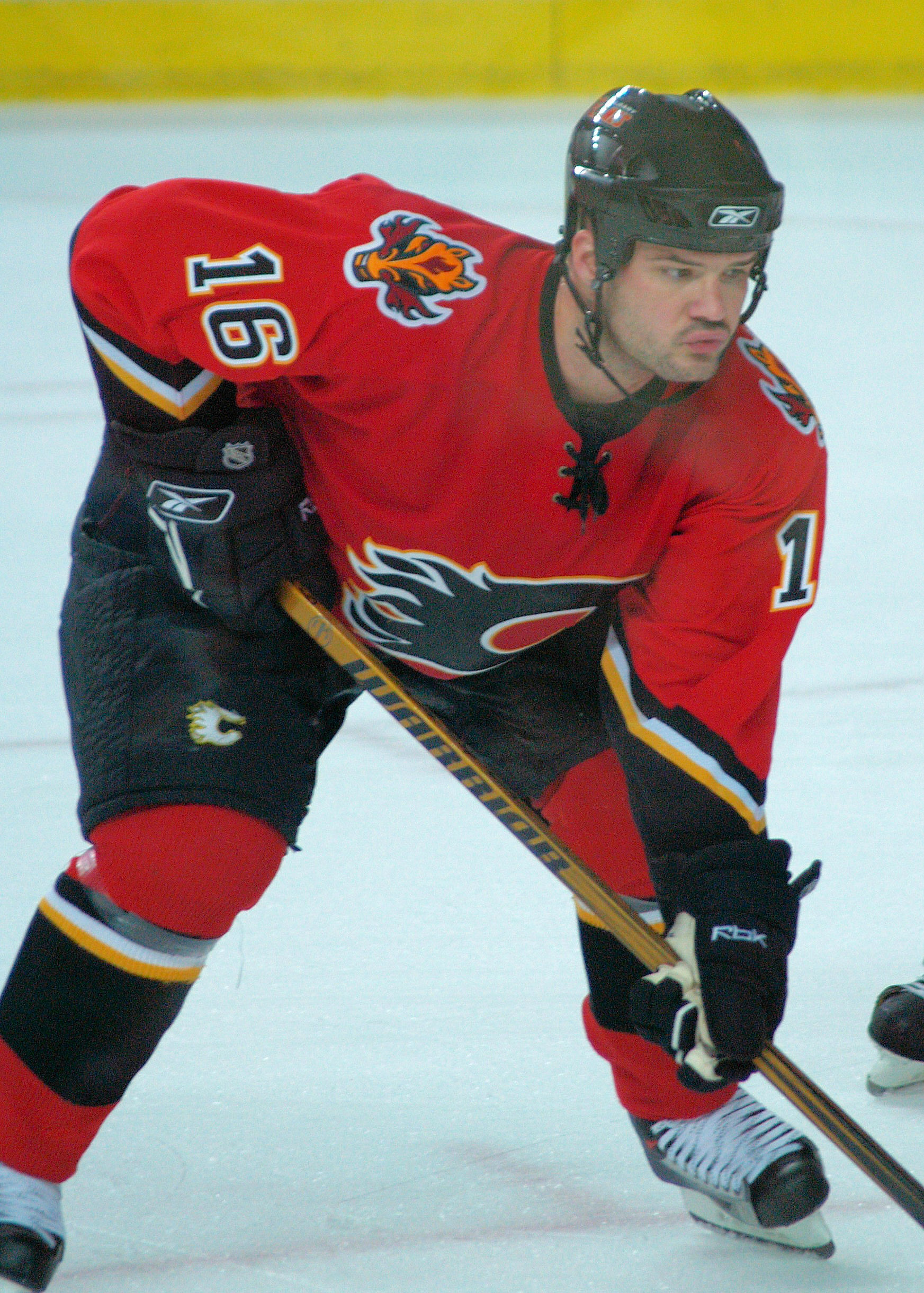
Jeff Friesen played for the Capitals from 2005 to 2006.

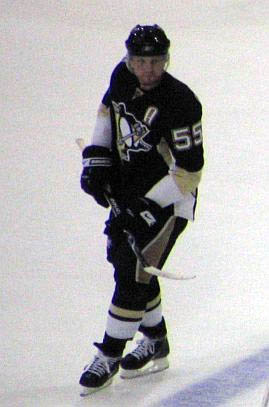
Sergei Gonchar was drafted by Washington in the 1992 NHL entry draft and played for the Capitals from 1994 to 2004.

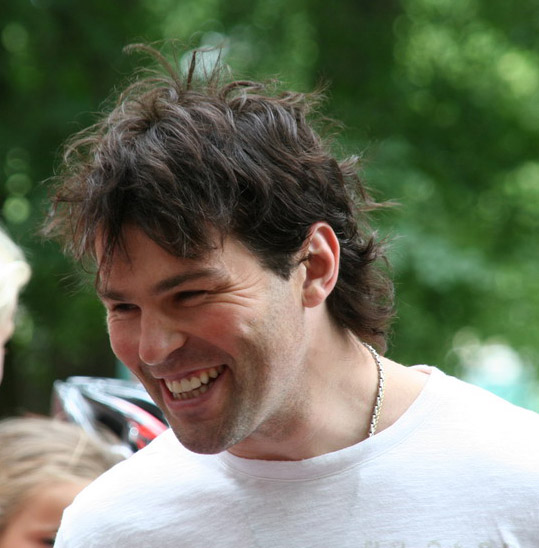
Jaromir Jagr played for the Capitals from 2001 to 2004.

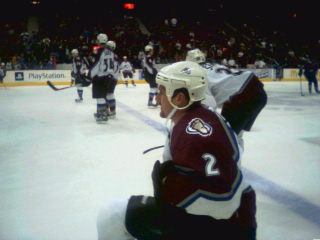
Ken Klee was drafted by Washington in the 1990 NHL entry draft and played for the Capitals from 1994 to 2003.

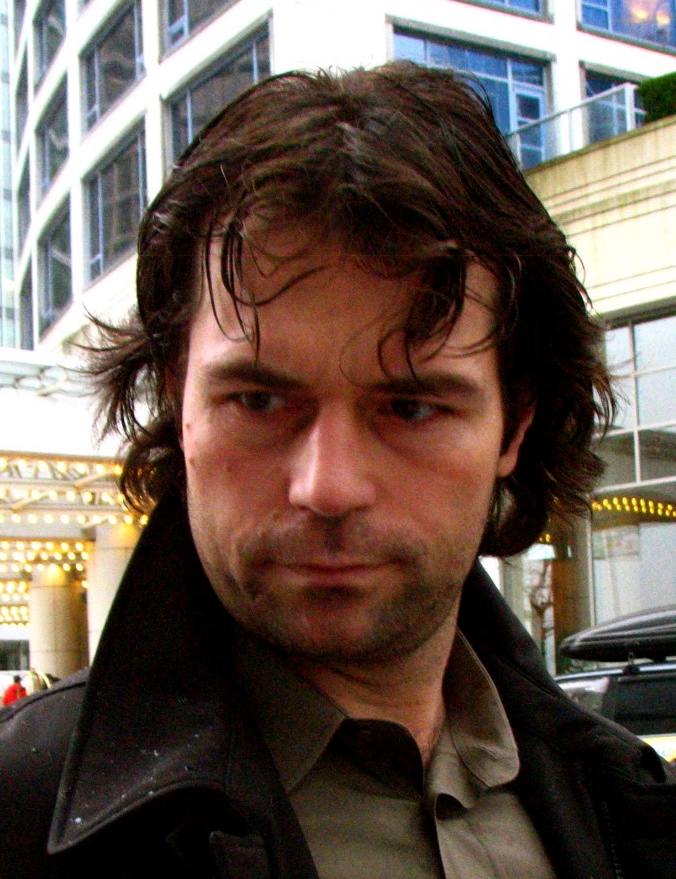
Robert Lang played for the Capitals from 2002 to 2004.

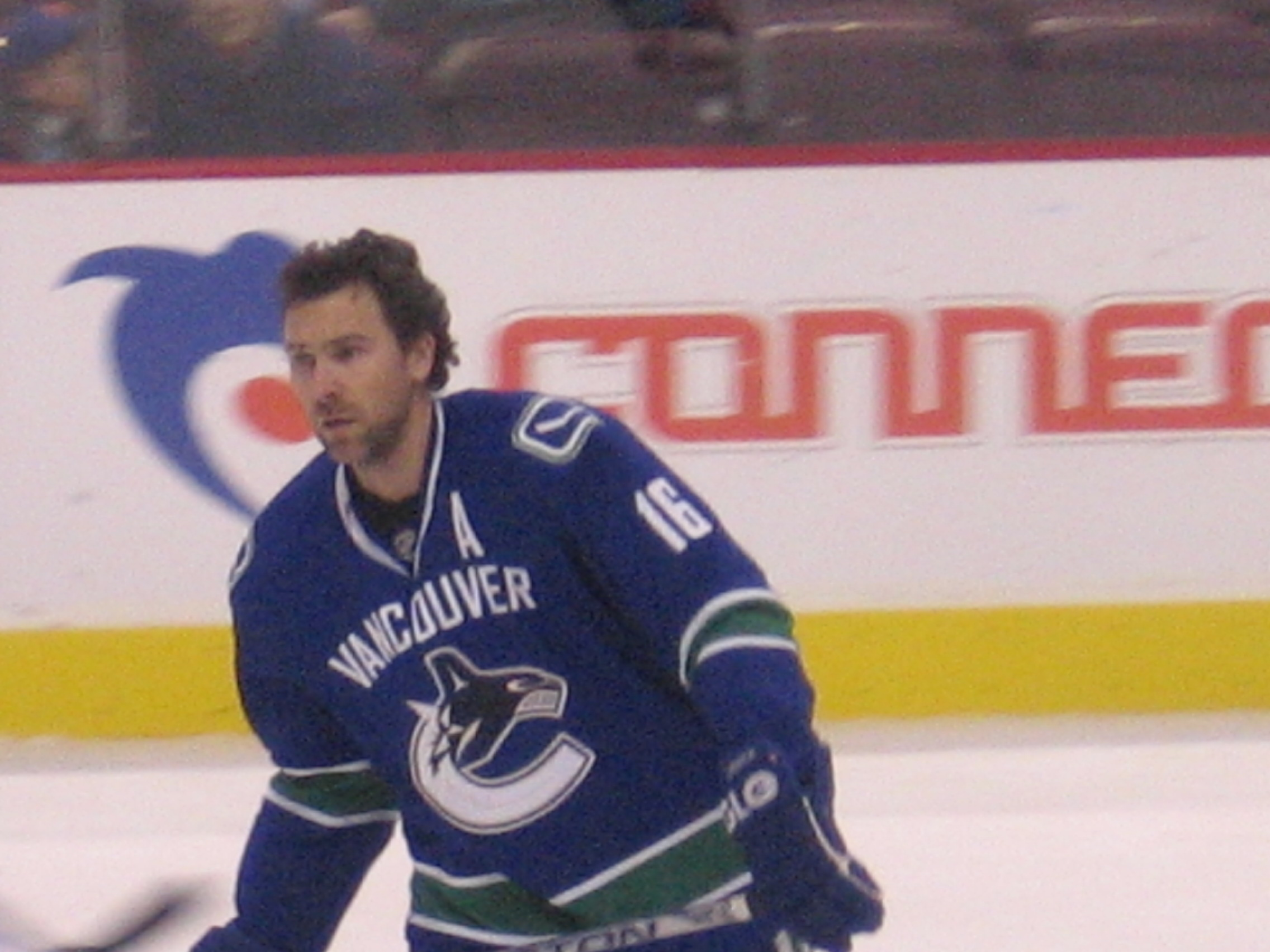
Trevor Linden played for the Capitals from 2000 to 2002.

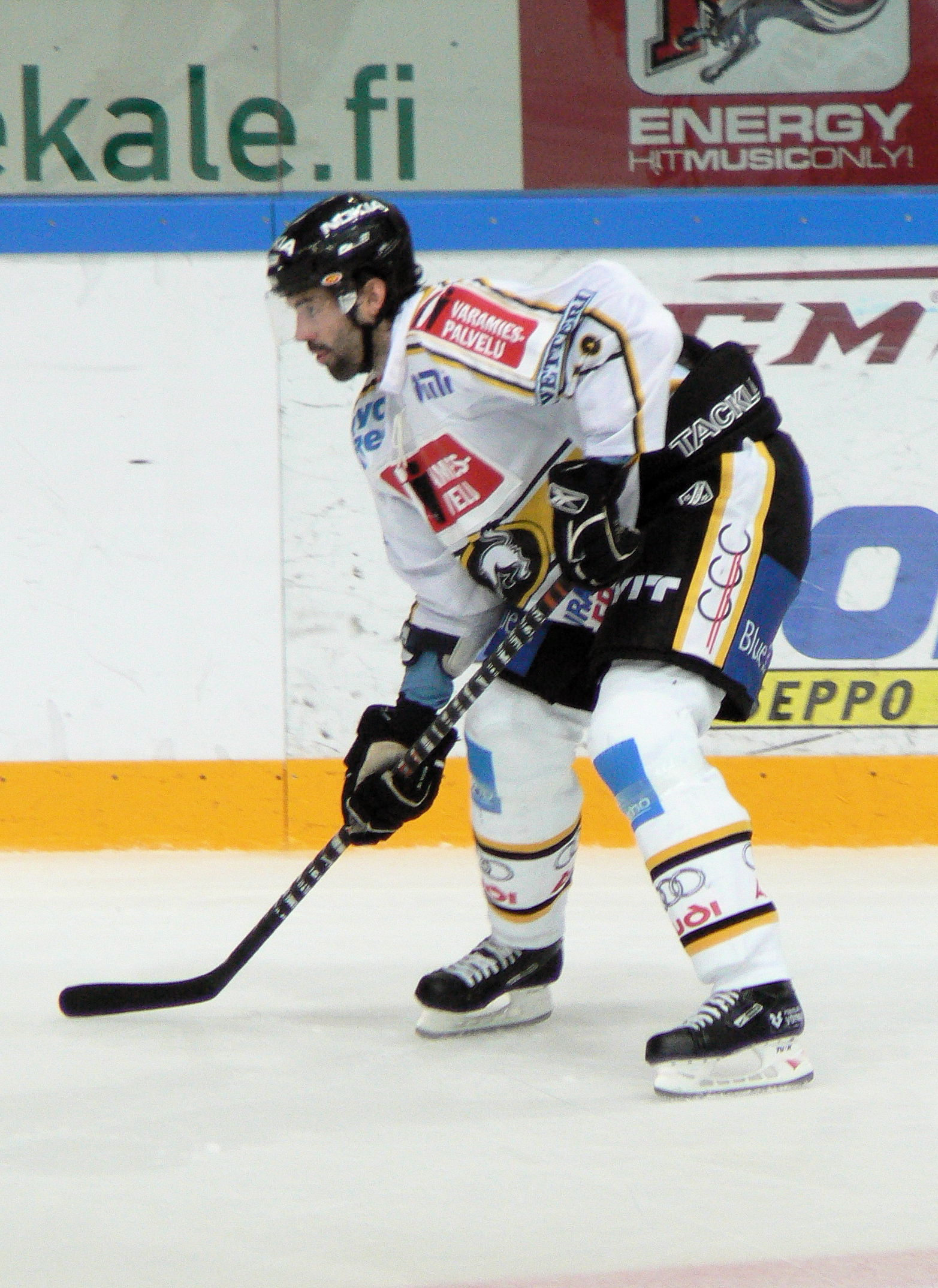
Ivan Majesky played for the Capitals from 2005 to 2006.

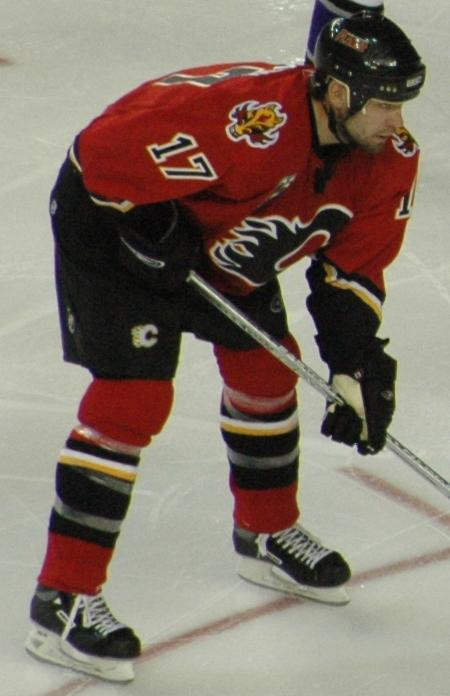
Chris Simon played for the Capitals from 1996 to 2003.

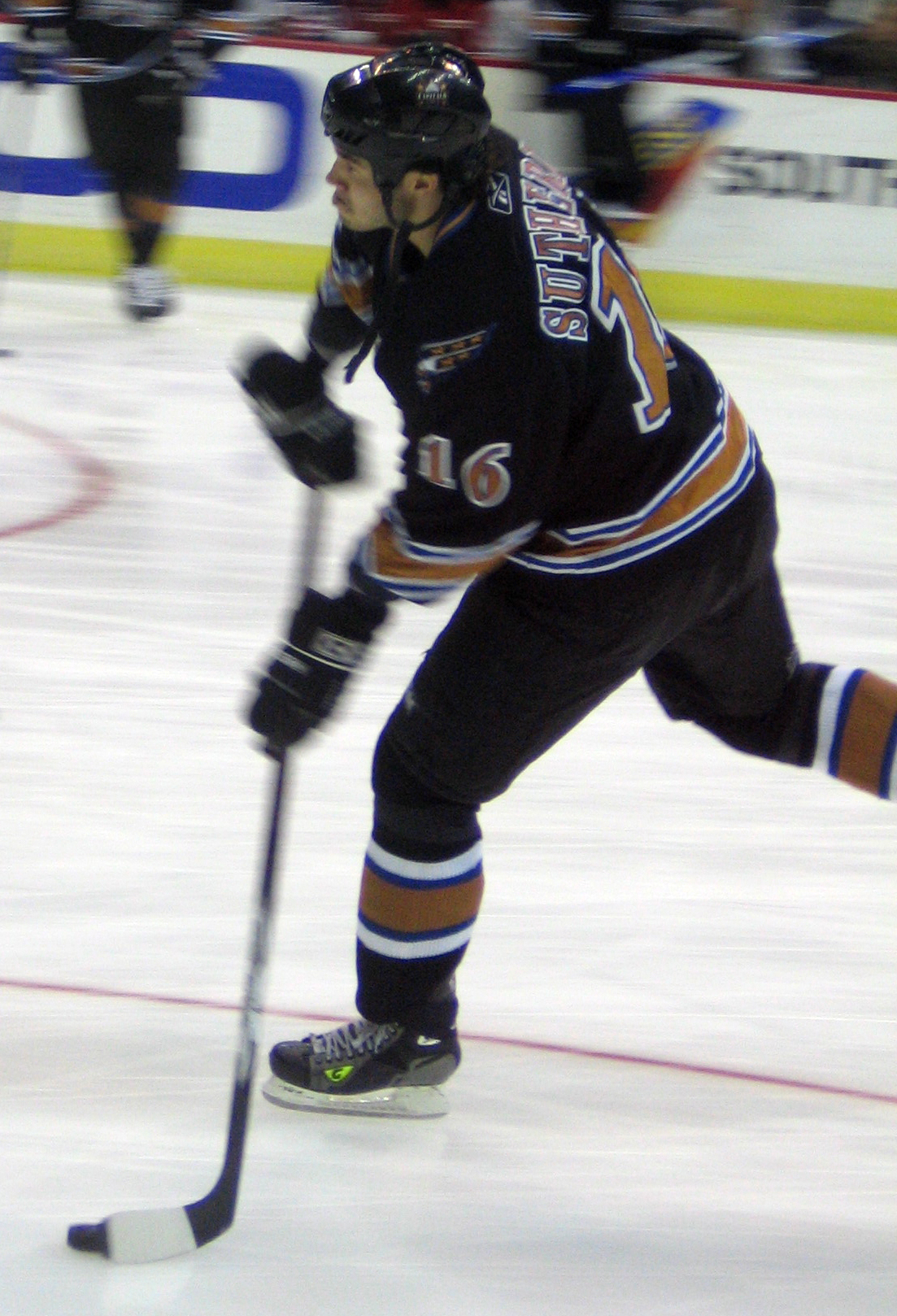
Brian Sutherby played for the Capitals from 2001 to 2007.

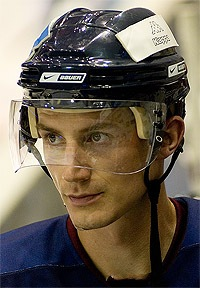
Roman Tvrdon was drafted by Washington in the 1999 NHL entry draft and played for the Capitals from 2003 to 2004.

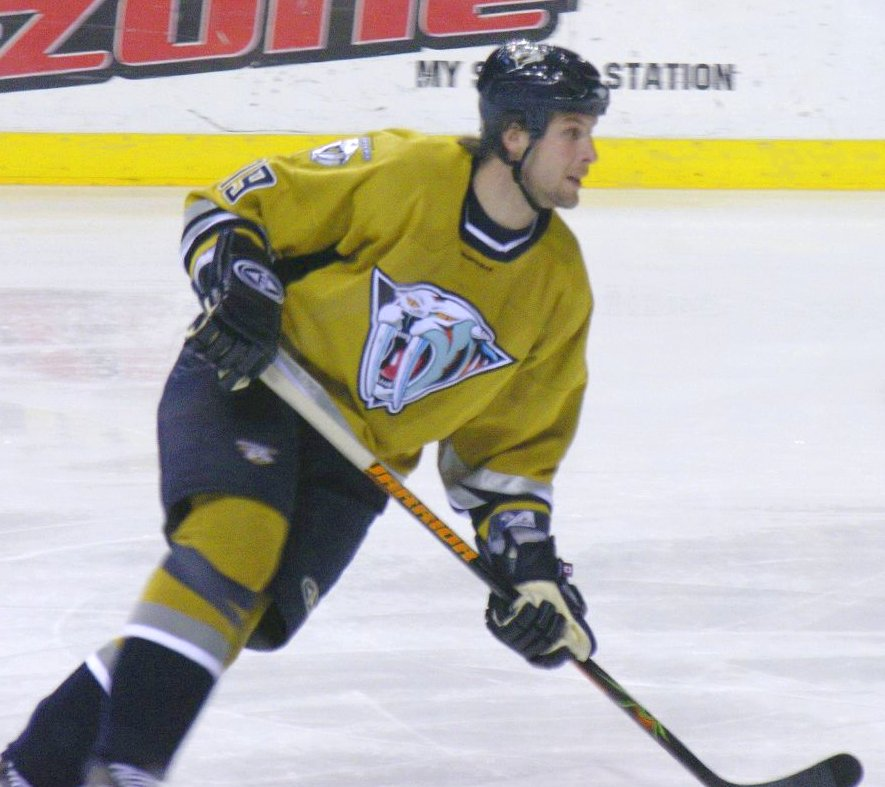
Brendan Witt was drafted by Washington in the 1993 NHL Draft and played for the Capitals from 1996 to 2004.

Name	Nat	Pos	Seasons	Regular season					Playoffs					Notes
Name	Nat	Pos	Seasons	GP	G	A	P	PIM	GP	G	A	P	PIM	Notes
Acton, Keith	(Canada)	C	1993–1994	6	0	0	0	21	—	—	—	—	—	
Adams, Greg	(Canada)	F	1983–1988	331	55	98	153	694	36	2	11	13	132	
Alexeyev, Alexander	(Russia)	D	2021–2025	80	1	7	8	12	14	0	1	1	8	
Allison, Jason	(Canada)	C	1993–1997	86	7	22	29	33	—	—	—	—	—	
Alzner, Karl	(Canada)	D	2008–2017	591	19	98	117	177	64	3	8	11	16	
Anderson, Murray	(Canada)	D	1974–1975	38	0	1	1	68	—	—	—	—	—	
Anderson, Ron	(Canada)	F	1974–1975	28	9	7	16	8	—	—	—	—	—	
Anderson, Shawn	(Canada)	D	1992–1994	110	2	15	17	30	14	1	0	1	12	
Andersson, Peter	(Sweden)	D	1983–1986	160	9	33	42	77	5	0	1	1	2	
Angelstad, Mel	(Canada)	LW	2003–2004	2	0	0	0	2	—	—	—	—	—	
Arnason, Chuck	(Canada)	RW	1978–1979	13	0	2	2	4	—	—	—	—	—	
Arnott, Jason	(Canada)	C	2010–2011	11	4	3	7	8	9	1	5	6	2	
Atkinson, Steve	(Canada)	RW	1974–1975	46	11	4	15	8	—	—	—	—	—	
Aube-Kubel, Nicolas	(Canada)	RW	2022–2024	107	10	18	28	69	3	0	0	0	2	
Aucoin, Keith	(United States)	RW	2008–2012	49	6	16	22	4	14	0	2	2	2	
Augusta, Patrik	(Czech Republic)	LW	1998–1999	2	0	0	0	0	—	—	—	—	—	
Babcock, Bob	(Canada)	D	1990–1991; 1992–1993	2	0	0	0	2	—	—	—	—	—	
Backstrom, Nicklas^{†}	(Sweden)	C	2007–2025	1105	271	762	1033	504	139	38	76	114	62	SC 2018
Bailey, Garnet	(Canada)	LW	1974–1978	207	43	71	114	162	—	—	—	—	—	
Barber, Riley	(United States)	RW	2016–2017	3	0	0	0	0	—	—	—	—	—	
Barrett, John	(Canada)	D	1985–1987	69	2	5	7	55	9	2	1	3	35	
Battaglia, Bates	(United States)	LW	2003–2004	66	4	6	10	38	—	—	—	—	—	
Baumgartner, Nolan	(Canada)	D	1995–1996; 1997–2000	18	0	2	2	2	1	0	0	0	10	
Bawa, Robin	(Canada)	RW	1989–1990	5	1	0	1	6	—	—	—	—	—	
Beagle, Jay^{†}	(Canada)	RW	2008–2018	471	51	65	116	159	85	8	11	19	26	SC 2018
Bear, Ethan	(Canada)	D	2023–2024	24	1	3	4	10	—	—	—	—	—	
Beaudoin, Yves	(Canada)	D	1985–1988	11	0	0	0	5	—	—	—	—	—	
Beauvillier, Anthony*	(Canada)	LW	2024–Present	100	17	16	33	30	10	2	4	6	2	
Beech, Kris	(Canada)	C	2000–2001; 2005–2007	73	18	8	26	52	—	—	—	—	—	
Belanger, Eric	(Canada)	C	2009–2010	17	2	4	6	4	7	0	1	1	4	
Bellows, Brian	(Canada)	RW	1997–1999	87	23	22	45	32	21	6	7	13	6	
Benda, Jan	(Germany)	C	1997–1998	9	0	3	3	6	—	—	—	—	—	
Bennett, Harvey	(United States)	C	1975–1977	67	14	16	30	73	—	—	—	—	—	
Berezin, Sergei	(Russia)	LW	2002–2003	9	5	4	9	4	6	0	1	1	0	
Bergeron, Michel	(Canada)	RW	1978–1979	30	7	6	13	7	—	—	—	—	—	
Bergland, Tim	(United States)	RW	1989–1992; 1993–1994	104	8	18	26	58	26	2	2	4	22	
Berry, Rick	(Canada)	D	2002–2004	108	2	7	9	195	—	—	—	—	—	
Berube, Craig	(Canada)	LW	1993–1999; 2000–2001	419	26	38	64	1220	38	1	0	1	90	
Bidner, Todd	(Canada)	C	1981–1982	12	2	1	3	7	—	—	—	—	—	
Biron, Mathieu	(Canada)	D	2005–2006	52	4	9	13	50	—	—	—	—	—	
Black, James	(Canada)	D	1998–2001	166	25	28	53	24	—	—	—	—	—	
Blomqvist, Timo	(Finland)	D	1981–1985	223	4	51	5	264	13	0	0	0	8	
Bloom, Mike	(Canada)	LW	1974–1975	67	7	19	26	84	—	—	—	—	—	
Blum, John	(United States)	D	1986–1987	67	2	8	10	133	6	0	1	1	4	
Boileau, Patrick	(Canada)	D	1996–1997; 1998–1999; 2001–2002	7	0	1	1	4	—	—	—	—	—	
Bolonchuk, Larry	(Canada)	D	1975–1978	59	3	9	12	91	—	—	—	—	—	
Bondra, Peter	(Czechoslovakia) (Slovakia)	RW	1990–2004	961	472	353	825	679	73	30	26	56	54	
Borgstrom, Henrik	(Finland)	C	2022–2023	1	0	0	0	0	—	—	—	—	—	
Bouchard, Pierre	(Canada)	D	1978–1982	106	8	16	24	54	—	—	—	—	—	
Boumedienne, Josef	(Sweden)	D	2002–2004	43	3	12	15	30	—	—	—	—	—	
Bourque, Chris	(United States)	LW	2007–2010	13	1	0	1	2	—	—	—	—	—	
Bowey, Madison	(Canada)	D	2017–2019	84	1	17	18	62	—	—	—	—	—	
Boyd, Travis^{†}	(United States)	C	2017–2020	85	8	23	31	10	6	1	0	1	0	SC 2018
Bradley, Matt	(Canada)	RW	2005–2011	427	37	59	96	367	37	3	8	11	8	
Bragnalo, Rick	(Canada)	C	1975–1979	145	15	35	50	46	—	—	—	—	—	
Brashear, Donald	(United States)	LW	2006–2009	220	10	15	25	396	11	1	1	2	18	
Brooks, Gord	(Canada)	RW	1974–1975	38	1	10	11	25	—	—	—	—	—	
Brossart, Willie	(Canada)	D	1974–1976	61	1	8	9	54	—	—	—	—	—	
Brouillette, Julien	(Canada)	D	2013–2014	10	1	1	2	0	—	—	—	—	—	
Brouwer, Troy	(Canada)	RW	2011–2015	293	83	69	152	234	35	3	6	9	28	
Brown, Chris	(United States)	C	2013–2016	12	2	1	3	2	—	—	—	—	—	
Brown, Connor	(Canada)	RW	2022–2023	4	0	0	0	0	—	—	—	—	—	
Brown, Jeff	(Canada)	D	1997–1998	9	0	6	6	6	2	0	2	2	0	
Brunette, Andrew	(Canada)	LW	1995–1998	62	18	22	40	24	6	1	3	4	0	
Bulis, Jan	(Czech Republic)	C	1997–2001	181	26	62	88	80	—	—	—	—	—	
Bulley, Ted	(Canada)	LW	1982–1983	39	4	9	13	47	1	0	0	0	0	
Burakovsky, Andre^{†}	(Sweden)	LW	2014–2019	328	62	83	145	77	56	9	9	18	12	SC 2018
Burridge, Randy	(Canada)	LW	1991–1995	150	48	61	109	125	17	1	3	4	12	
Burton, Nelson	(Canada)	LW	1991–1995	8	1	0	1	21	—	—	—	—	—	
Calder, Eric	(Canada)	D	1981–1983	2	0	0	0	0	—	—	—	—	—	
Camazzola, Tony	(Canada)	LW	1981–1982	3	0	0	0	4	—	—	—	—	—	
Carey, Paul	(United States)	C	2015–2017	10	1	0	1	0	1	0	0	0	0	
Carlson, John*^{†}	(United States)	D	2009–Present	1143	166	605	771	390	137	21	57	78	56	SC 2018
Carlson, Kent	(United States)	D	1988–1989	2	1	0	1	0	—	—	—	—	—	
Carlsson, Gabriel	(Sweden)	D	2022–2023	6	0	2	2	0	—	—	—	—	—	
Carpenter, Bobby	(United States)	C	1981–1987; 1992–1993	490	188	207	395	462	32	10	13	23	53	
Carr, Daniel*	(Canada)	LW	2020–2021	6	0	1	1	2	1	0	0	0	2	
Carrick, Connor	(United States)	D	2013–2016	37	1	5	6	23	—	—	—	—	—	
Carroll, Greg	(Canada)	C	1978–1979	24	5	6	11	12	—	—	—	—	—	
Carter, Anson	(Canada)	C	1996–1997; 2003–2004	38	8	7	15	13	—	—	—	—	—	
Cassels, Andrew	(Canada)	C	2005–2006	31	4	8	12	14	—	—	—	—	—	
Cassolato, Tony	(Canada)	RW	1979–1982	23	1	6	7	4	—	—	—	—	—	
Cavallini, Paul	(Canada)	D	1986–1988; 1992–1993	101	7	13	20	120	6	0	2	2	18	
Chambers, Shawn	(United States)	D	1991–1992	2	0	0	0	2	—	—	—	—	—	
Chara, Zdeno*	(Slovakia)	D	2020–2021	55	2	8	10	44	5	0	0	0	2	
Charron, Eric	(Canada)	D	1995–1997	29	1	2	3	24	6	0	0	0	8	
Charron, Guy	(Canada)	C	1976–1981	320	118	156	274	54	—	—	—	—	—	C, 1978—79
Chasse, Denis	(Canada)	D	1995–1996	3	0	0	0	5	—	—	—	—	—	
Chiasson, Alex^{†}	(Canada)	RW	2017–2018	61	9	9	18	26	16	1	1	2	4	SC 2018
Chimera, Jason	(Canada)	LW	2009–2016	490	82	115	197	350	63	12	14	26	30	
Chisholm, Declan*	(Canada)	D	2025–Present	26	1	6	7	4	—	—	—	—	—	
Cholowski, Dennis	(Canada)	D	2021–2022	7	0	1	1	2	—	—	—	—	—	
Chorney, Taylor	(United States)	D	2015–2018	97	3	12	15	40	7	0	1	1	4	
Chorske, Tom	(United States)	LW	1998–1999	17	0	2	2	4	—	—	—	—	—	
Christian, Dave	(United States)	RW	1983–1990	503	193	224	417	107	49	17	20	36	17	
Church, Brad	(Canada)	LW	1997–1998	2	0	0	0	0	—	—	—	—	—	
Chychrun, Jakob*	(United States)	D	2024–Present	154	46	61	107	114	10	3	2	5	6	
Ciccarelli, Dino^{†}	(Canada)	RW	1988–1992	223	112	97	209	278	32	21	14	35	54	HHOF, 2010
Ciccone, Enrico	(Canada)	D	1993–1994; 1998–1999	89	3	1	4	277	—	—	—	—	—	
Ciernik, Ivan	(Slovakia)	LW	2001–2004	60	9	12	21	26	2	0	1	1	6	
Clark, Chris	(United States)	RW	2005–2010	240	60	63	123	278	8	1	0	1	8	C, 2006–2010
Clement, Bill	(Canada)	C	1975–1976	46	10	17	27	20	—	—	—	—	—	C, 1975—76
Clippingdale, Steve	(Canada)	LW	1979–1980	3	0	0	0	0	—	—	—	—	—	
Clymer, Ben	(United States)	D	2005–2007	143	23	30	53	116	—	—	—	—	—	
Collins, Bill	(Canada)	C	1976–1978	128	21	23	44	44	—	—	—	—	—	
Collins, Sean	(Canada)	D	2008–2012	21	2	1	3	12	1	0	0	0	0	
Collins, Sean	(Canada)	C	2015–2016	2	0	0	0	2	—	—	—	—	—	
Connolly, Brett^{†}	(Canada)	RW	2016–2019	217	52	44	96	94	38	8	3	11	12	SC 2018
Cooke, Matt	(Canada)	LW	2007–2008	17	3	4	7	27	7	0	0	0	4	
Corrinet, Chris	(United States)	W	2001–2002	8	0	1	1	6	—	—	—	—	—	
Corriveau, Yvon	(Canada)	LW	1985–1990	146	23	18	41	220	18	1	5	6	32	
Corvo, Joe	(United States)	D	2009–2010	18	2	4	6	2	7	1	1	2	4	
Cote, Alain	(Canada)	D	1989–1990	2	0	0	0	7	—	—	—	—	—	
Cote, Sylvain	(Canada)	D	1991–1998; 2000–2003	622	75	195	270	336	40	6	14	20	30	
Coulis, Tim	(Canada)	F	1979–1980	19	1	2	3	27	—	—	—	—	—	
Courtnall, Geoff	(Canada)	LW	1988–1990	159	77	77	154	216	21	6	14	20	44	
Cowick, Bruce	(Canada)	F	1974–1975	65	5	6	11	41	—	—	—	—	—	
Crabb, Joey	(United States)	RW	2012–2013	26	2	0	2	8	—	—	—	—	—	
Crawford, Bob	(Canada)	RW	1986–1987	12	0	0	0	0	—	—	—	—	—	
Cronin, Shawn	(United States)	D	1988–1989	1	0	0	0	0	—	—	—	—	—	
Curran, Brian	(Canada)	D	1993–1994	26	1	0	1	61	—	—	—	—	—	
Currie, Glen	(Canada)	LW	1979–1985	307	38	77	115	91	12	1	3	4	4	
Cutta, Jakub	(Czech Republic)	D	2000–2004	8	0	0	0	0	—	—	—	—	—	
Dahlen, Ulf	(Sweden)	RW	1999–2002	217	53	85	138	22	11	0	2	2	4	
Deschamps, Nicolas	(Canada)	LW	2013–2014	3	0	0	0	0	—	—	—	—	—	
Dillon, Brenden	(Canada)	D	2019–2021	66	2	17	19	70	13	1	1	2	8	
Djoos, Christian^{†}	(Sweden)	D	2017–2020	110	4	20	24	14	25	0	1	1	4	SC 2018
Doig, Jason	(Canada)	D	2002–2004	120	5	14	19	213	6	0	1	1	6	
Doull, Doug	(Canada)	LW	2005–2006	2	0	0	0	19	—	—	—	—	—	
Dowd, Nic*	(United States)	C	2018–Present	506	79	87	166	305	40	4	2	6	32	
Druce, John	(Canada)	RW	1988–1992	240	57	64	121	199	34	16	4	20	32	
Dube, Pierrick	(France)	F	2023–2024	3	0	0	0	2	—	—	—	—	—	
Dubois, Pierre-Luc*	(Canada)	LW	2024–Present	111	25	60	85	95	10	0	3	3	12	
Duchesne, Gaetan	(Canada)	LW	1981–1987	451	87	138	225	251	33	10	6	16	39	
Duhaime, Brandon*	(United States)	RW	2024–Present	164	13	17	30	176	10	3	1	4	10	
Dupere, Denis	(Canada)	LW	1974–1975	53	20	15	35	8	—	—	—	—	—	
Eagles, Mike	(Canada)	LW	1994–2000	266	13	22	35	206	25	1	5	6	6	
Eakin, Cody	(Canada)	C	2011–2012	30	4	4	8	4	—	—	—	—	—	
Edberg, Rolf	(Sweden)	C	1978–1981	184	45	58	103	24	—	—	—	—	—	
Edmundson, Joel	(Canada)	D	2023–2024	44	1	5	6	19	—	—	—	—	—	
Egers, Jack	(Canada)	RW	1974–1976	26	6	5	11	16	—	—	—	—	—	
Eller, Lars^{†}	(Denmark)	C	2016–2023; 2024–2025	551	93	130	223	282	68	9	23	32	34	SC 2018
Elomo, Miika	(Finland)	LW	1999–2000	2	0	1	1	2	—	—	—	—	—	
Elynuik, Pat	(Canada)	RW	1992–1994	84	23	36	59	66	6	2	3	5	19	
Eminger, Steve	(Canada)	D	2002–2008	212	6	37	43	221	5	1	0	1	2	
Engblom, Brian	(Canada)	D	1982–1984	79	5	23	28	67	4	0	2	2	2	
Erat, Martin	(Czech Republic)	RW	2012–2014	62	2	25	27	26	4	0	0	0	4	
Erickson, Bryan	(United States)	F	1983–1985	102	27	30	57	39	8	2	3	5	7	
Erskine, John	(Canada)	D	2006–2014	340	12	37	49	529	39	1	6	7	32	
Evans, Daryl	(Canada)	LW	1985–1986	6	0	1	1	0	—	—	—	—	—	
Evason, Dean	(Canada)	C	1983–1985	17	3	4	7	4	—	—	—	—	—	
Fahey, Brian	(United States)	D	2010–2011	7	0	1	1	2	—	—	—	—	—	
Farrell, Mike	(United States)	RW	2001–2003	12	0	0	0	2	—	—	—	—	—	
Fata, Rico	(Canada)	RW	2005–2007	31	4	4	8	10	—	—	—	—	—	
Fedorov, Sergei^{†}	(Russia)	C	2007–2009	70	13	33	46	58	21	2	11	13	20	HHOF, 2015
Fehervary, Martin*	(Slovakia)	D	2019–Present	380	27	75	103	151	12	2	1	3	10	
Fehr, Eric	(Canada)	RW	2005–2011; 2012–2015	419	87	87	174	140	37	5	1	6	12	
Felix, Chris	(Canada)	D	1987–1991	35	1	12	13	10	2	0	1	1	0	
Ferner, Mike	(Canada)	D	1989–1991	9	0	1	1	4	—	—	—	—	—	
Ferraro, Chris	(United States)	C	2001–2002	1	0	1	1	0	—	—	—	—	—	
Ferarro, Peter	(United States)	RW	2001–2002	4	0	1	1	0	—	—	—	—	—	
Fleischmann, Tomas	(Czech Republic)	LW	2005–2011	283	60	78	138	84	22	3	2	5	10	
Forbes, Colin	(Canada)	W	2001–2004; 2005–2006	54	5	3	8	17	—	—	—	—	—	
Forbes, Dave	(Canada)	LW	1977–1979	79	11	12	23	121	—	—	—	—	—	
Forsyth, Alex	(Canada)	F	1976–1977	1	0	0	0	0	—	—	—	—	—	
Fortin, Jean-Francois	(Canada)	D	2001–2004	71	1	4	5	42	—	—	—	—	—	
Franceschetti, Lou	(Canada)	RW	1981–1982; 1983-1989	327	36	58	94	562	33	2	1	3	83	
Frank, Ethen*	(United States)	F	2024–Present	86	16	15	31	24	—	—	—	—	—	
Friesen, Jeff	(Canada)	LW	2005–2006	33	3	4	7	24	—	—	—	—	—	
Fullan, Larry	(Canada)	F	1974–1975	4	1	0	1	0	—	—	—	—	—	
Fussey, Owen	(Canada)	LW	2003–2004	4	0	1	1	0	—	—	—	—	—	
Galiev, Stanislav	(Russia)	RW	2014–2017	26	1	3	4	4	—	—	—	—	—	
Galley, Garry	(Canada)	D	1986–1988	76	8	33	41	54	15	2	4	6	13	
Gardner, Paul	(Canada)	C	1984–1985	12	2	4	6	6	—	—	—	—	—	
Gartner, Mike^{†}	(Canada)	RW	1979–1989	758	397	392	789	770	47	16	27	43	61	HHOF, 2001
Gendron, Martin	(Canada)	RW	1994–1996	28	4	2	6	10	—	—	—	—	—	
Gersich, Shane^{†}	(United States)	LW	2017–2018	3	0	1	1	0	2	0	0	0	0	SC 2018
Gibson, Doug	(Canada)	C	1977–1978	11	2	1	3	0	—	—	—	—	—	
Gilbertson, Stan	(United States)	LW	1974–1976	56	24	21	45	18	—	—	—	—	—	
Girard, Bob	(Canada)	F	1977–1980	132	18	29	47	42	—	—	—	—	—	
Giroux, Alexandre	(Canada)	C	2006–2010	30	4	5	9	16	—	—	—	—	—	
Godin, Eddy	(Canada)	RW	1977–1979	27	3	6	9	12	—	—	—	—	—	
Gonchar, Sergei	(Russia)	D	1994–2004	654	144	272	416	517	51	13	18	31	48	
Gordon, Boyd	(Canada)	RW	2003–2011	363	27	58	85	82	36	1	4	5	10	
Gordon, Andrew	(Canada)	RW	2003–2010	12	1	1	2	0	—	—	—	—	—	
Gould, Bobby	(Canada)	F	1981–1989	600	134	142	276	474	50	12	12	24	50	
Grabovski, Mikhail	(Belarus)	C	2013–2014	58	13	22	35	26	—	—	—	—	—	
Grand-Pierre, Jean-Luc	(Canada)	D	2003–2004	13	1	0	1	14	—	—	—	—	—	
Graovac, Tyler	(Canada)	C	2017–2018	5	0	0	0	2	—	—	—	—	—	
Gratton, Benoit	(Canada)	C	1997–1999	22	4	4	8	22	—	—	—	—	—	
Green, Josh	(Canada)	LW	2002–2003	21	1	2	3	7	—	—	—	—	—	
Green, Mike	(Canada)	D	2005–2015	575	113	247	360	416	71	9	26	35	75	
Green, Rick	(Canada)	D	1976–1982	377	31	127	158	381	—	—	—	—	—	
Greenlaw, Jeff	(Canada)	LW	1986–1988; 1990–1993	53	3	5	8	106	1	0	0	0	2	
Grier, Mike	(United States)	RW	2002–2004	150	23	29	52	68	6	1	1	2	2	
Gruden, John	(United States)	D	2003–2004	11	1	0	1	6	—	—	—	—	—	
Gryp, Bob	(Canada)	F	1974–1976	73	11	13	24	33	—	—	—	—	—	
Gudas, Radko	(Czech Republic)	D	2019–2020	63	2	13	15	40	5	0	2	2	2	
Gustafsson, Bengt-Ake	(Sweden)	F	1979–1989	629	196	359	555	196	18	5	9	15	10	
Gustafsson, Erik	(Sweden)	D	2022–2023	61	7	31	38	21	—	—	—	—	—	
Hagelin, Carl	(Sweden)	LW	2018–2022	187	20	46	66	65	20	0	3	3	2	
Hajt, Chris	(Canada)	D	2003–2004	5	0	0	0	2	—	—	—	—	—	
Halpern, Jeff	(United States)	F	1999–2006; 2011–2012	507	91	139	230	375	19	4	5	9	23	C, 2005–06
Halverson, Trevor	(Canada)	LW	1998–1999	17	0	4	4	28	—	—	—	—	—	
Häman Aktell, Hardy	(Sweden)	D	2023–2024	6	0	1	1	2	—	—	—	—	—	
Hamrlik, Roman	(Czech Republic)	D	2011–2013	72	2	12	14	36	14	1	3	4	12	
Hangsleben, Alan	(United States)	D	1979–1982	130	16	27	43	262	—	—	—	—	—	
Hannan, Scott	(Canada)	D	2010–2011	55	1	4	5	28	9	0	1	1	2	
Harlock, David	(Canada)	D	1997–1998	6	0	0	0	4	—	—	—	—	—	
Hatcher, Kevin	(United States)	D	1984–1994	685	149	277	426	999	84	16	32	48	224	C, 1993—94
Hathaway, Garnet	(United States)	RW	2019–2023	257	38	38	76	254	19	3	2	5	32	
Haworth, Alan	(Canada)	C	1982–1987	346	129	139	268	249	32	8	11	19	24	
Hay, Dwayne	(Canada)	LW	1997–1998	2	0	0	0	2	—	—	—	—	—	
Hebling, Timo	(Switzerland)	D	2006–2007	2	0	0	0	2	—	—	—	—	—	
Helmer, Bryan	(Canada)	D	2008–2009	12	0	3	3	2	—	—	—	—	—	
Henderson, Archie	(Canada)	RW	1980–1981	7	1	0	1	28	—	—	—	—	—	
Hendricks, Matt	(United States)	C	2010–2013	203	18	24	42	278	28	1	1	2	10	
Henry, Alex	(Canada)	D	2002–2003	38	0	0	0	80	—	—	—	—	—	
Herr, Matt	(United States)	C	1998–1999; 2000–2001	52	4	5	9	25	—	—	—	—	—	
Heward, Jamie	(Canada)	D	2005–2007	123	11	33	44	81	—	—	—	—	—	
Hextall, Dennis	(Canada)	LW	1978–1980	41	3	10	13	92	—	—	—	—	—	
Hicks, Doug	(Canada)	D	1981–1983	18	0	1	1	18	—	—	—	—	—	
Hidi, Andre	(Canada)	F	1983–1985	7	2	1	3	9	2	0	0	0	0	
Hillen, Jack	(United States)	RW	2012–2015	71	3	12	15	28	7	0	1	1	6	
Hogue, Benoit	(Canada)	LW	2001–2002	9	0	1	1	4	—	—	—	—	—	
Holt, Randy	(Canada)	D	1981–1983	123	2	14	16	525	4	0	1	1	20	
Houlder, Bill	(Canada)	D	1987–1990	79	2	16	18	42	—	—	—	—	—	
Housley, Phil	(United States)	D	1996–1998	141	17	54	71	48	18	0	4	4	4	HHOF, 2004
Houston, Ken	(Canada)	D	1982–1984	75	25	14	39	97	4	1	0	1	4	
Hrycuik, Jim	(Canada)	F	1974–1975	21	5	5	10	12	—	—	—	—	—	
Hunt, Jamie	(Canada)	D	2006–2007	1	0	0	0	0	—	—	—	—	—	
Hunter, Dale	(Canada)	C	1987–1999	872	181	375	556	2003	100	25	47	72	370	C, 1994—99
Hunter, Mark	(Canada)	F	1992–1993	7	0	0	0	14	—	—	—	—	—	
Huscroft, Jamie	(Canada)	D	1999–2000	7	0	0	0	11	—	—	—	—	—	
Hutson, Cole*	(United States)	D	2025–Present	14	3	7	10	8	—	—	—	—	—	
Iafrate, Al	(United States)	D	1990–1994	256	58	118	176	616	23	11	5	16	40	
Iorio, Vincent	(Canada)	D	2022–2024	9	0	1	1	0	—	—	—	—	—	
Irwin, Matt	(Canada)	D	2021–2023	78	3	6	9	42	—	—	—	—	—	
Jagr, Jaromir	(Czech Republic)	RW	2001–2004	190	83	118	201	94	6	2	5	7	2	
Jarvis, Doug	(Canada)	C	1982–1986	265	31	81	112	70	17	3	4	7	8	ST, 1983—84
Jarvis, Wes	(Canada)	F	1979–1982	144	21	41	62	56	—	—	—	—	—	
Jaskin, Dmitrij	(Czech Republic)	RW	2018–Present	37	2	6	8	6	—	—	—	—	—	
Jennings, Grant	(Canada)	D	1987–1988	0	0	0	0	0	1	0	0	0	0	
Jensen, David	(United States)	F	1985–1988	56	9	9	18	16	11	0	0	0	2	
Jensen, Nick	(United States)	D	2018–2024	372	13	78	91	80	27	0	0	0	10	
Jerabek, Jakub^{†}	(Czech Republic)	D	2017–2018	11	1	3	4	0	2	0	1	1	2	SC 2018
Johansen, Lucas	(Canada)	D	2021–2024	9	0	2	2	4	2	0	0	0	0	
Johansson, Calle	(Sweden)	D	1988–2003	984	113	361	474	449	95	12	42	54	42	
Johansson, Marcus	(Sweden)	C	2010–2017; 2021–2023	579	118	206	324	70	75	10	22	32	6	
Johansson, Jonas	(Sweden)	RW	2005–2006	1	0	0	0	2	—	—	—	—	—	
Johnson, Craig	(United States)	LW	2003–2004	15	0	6	6	8	—	—	—	—	—	
Johnson, Jim	(United States)	D	1993–1996	121	2	17	19	89	13	0	2	2	14	
Johnston, Jay	(Canada)	D	1980–1982	8	0	0	0	13	—	—	—	—	—	
Joly, Greg	(Canada)	D	1974–1976	98	9	24	33	72	—	—	—	—	—	
Jones, Keith	(Canada)	RW	1992–1997	258	62	65	127	454	26	4	5	9	75	
Jones, Ron	(Canada)	D	1974–1976	21	1	1	2	16	—	—	—	—	—	
Jonsson Fjallby, Axel	(Sweden)	LW	2021–2023	73	8	10	18	12	—	—	—	—	—	
Joyce, Bob	(Canada)	LW	1989–1991	41	8	11	19	12	14	2	1	3	9	
Juneau, Joe	(Canada)	C	1993–1999	312	62	172	234	98	44	13	28	41	22	
Jurcina, Milan	(Slovakia)	D	2006–2009	211	6	30	36	136	21	2	0	2	18	
Kaminski, Kevin	(Canada)	C	1993–1997	132	3	10	13	483	8	0	0	0	52	
Kämpf, David*	(Czech Republic)	C	2025–Present	2	0	0	0	2	—	—	—	—	—	
Kane, Boyd	(Canada)	LW	2005–2010	8	0	1	1	4	—	—	—	—	—	
Kastelic, Ed	(Canada)	RW	1985–1988	73	2	1	3	234	6	1	0	1	32	
Kaszycki, Mike	(Canada)	F	1979–1980	28	7	10	17	10	—	—	—	—	—	
Kelly, Bob	(Canada)	LW	1980–1982	96	26	40	66	169	—	—	—	—	—	
Kempny, Michal^{†}	(Czech Republic)	D	2017–2022	166	12	36	48	112	29	2	4	6	14	SC 2018
Khristich, Dmitri	(Soviet Union) (Ukraine)	RW	1990–1995; 2000–2002	419	140	161	301	218	45	9	17	26	33	
Kindrachuk, Orest	(Canada)	C	1981–1982	4	1	0	1	2	—	—	—	—	—	
King, D. J.	(Canada)	LW	2010–2012	17	0	2	2	30	—	—	—	—	—	
Kinsella, Brian	(Canada)	RW	1975–1977	10	0	1	1	0	—	—	—	—	—	
Klee, Ken	(United States)	D	1994–2003	570	43	68	111	608	34	1	5	3	38	
Kleinendorst, Scot	(United States)	D	1988–1990	18	1	4	5	26	3	0	0	0	0	
Klepis, Jakub	(Czech Republic)	C	2005–2007	66	4	10	14	36	—	—	—	—	—	
Konowalchuk, Steve	(United States)	LW	1991–2004	693	146	196	342	619	39	5	12	17	44	C, 2001–03
Kovalchuk, Ilya	(Russia)	LW	2019–2020	7	1	3	4	4	—	—	—	—	—	
Knuble, Mike	(United States)	RW	2009–2012	220	59	52	111	127	24	6	5	11	20	
Kordic, John	(Canada)	D	1990–1991	7	0	0	0	101	—	—	—	—	—	
Kozlov, Viktor	(Russia)	RW	2007–2009	148	29	66	95	34	21	4	5	9	8	
Kronwall, Staffan	(Sweden)	D	2008–2009	3	0	0	0	0	—	—	—	—	—	
Krygier, Todd	(United States)	LW	1991–1994; 1995–1998	318	49	75	124	306	35	8	4	12	36	
Kryskow, Dave	(Canada)	F	1974–1975	51	9	15	24	83	—	—	—	—	—	
Kucera, Frantisek	(Czech Republic)	D	2001–2002	56	1	13	14	12	—	—	—	—	—	
Kundratek, Tomas	(Czech Republic)	D	2011–2014	30	1	6	7	10	—	—	—	—	—	
Kuznetsov, Evgeny†	(Russia)	C/RW	2013–2024	723	171	397	568	388	87	29	38	67	48	SC 2018
Kwiatkowski, Joel	(Canada)	D	2002–2004	114	6	9	15	101	6	0	0	0	2	
Kypreos, Nick	(Canada)	LW	1989–1992	175	18	19	37	484	16	1	1	2	53	
Labre, Yvon	(Canada)	D	1974–1981	334	12	84	96	756	—	—	—	—	—	C, 1976—78
Laframboise, Pete	(Canada)	LW	1974–1975	45	5	10	15	22	—	—	—	—	—	
Laich, Brooks	(Canada)	C	2003–2016	742	133	191	324	297	65	10	22	32	26	
Laing, Quintin	(Canada)	LW	2007–2010	76	3	7	10	31	—	—	—	—	—	
Lalonde, Ron	(Canada)	F	1974–1979	291	35	58	93	90	—	—	—	—	—	
Lalor, Mike	(Canada)	D	1990–1992	132	6	12	18	125	10	1	2	3	22	
Lampman, Mike	(Canada)	LW	1975–1977	49	13	17	30	32	—	—	—	—	—	
Lane, Gord	(Canada)	D	1975–1980	235	10	43	53	614	—	—	—	—	—	
Lang, Robert	(Czech Republic)	C	2002–2004	145	51	92	143	46	6	2	1	3	2	
Langway, Rod^{†}	(United States)	D	1982–1993	726	25	177	202	502	78	2	16	18	55	HHOF, 2002; NT, 1982—84
Lapierre, Hendrix*	(Canada)	C	2021–Present	158	13	34	47	41	4	1	1	2	0	
Larsson, Johan	(Sweden)	C/LW	2021–2022	14	1	5	6	2	6	0	2	2	2	
Larter, Tyler	(Canada)	C	1989–1990	1	0	0	0	0	—	—	—	—	—	
Latta, Michael	(Canada)	C	2013–2016	113	4	13	17	130	4	0	0	0	2	
Laughlin, Craig	(Canada)	RW	1982–1988	428	110	173	283	284	27	6	4	10	18	
Leach, Steve	(United States)	RW	1985–1991	246	43	54	97	322	38	6	5	11	28	
Leason, Brett*	(Canada)	RW	2021–2022; 2025–Present	42	3	3	6	4	—	—	—	—	—	
LeBlanc, Peter	(Canada)	F	2013–2014	1	0	0	0	0	—	—	—	—	—	
Ledyard, Grant	(Canada)	D	1987–1989	82	7	14	21	57	14	1	0	1	30	
Lefebvre, Patrice	(Canada)	RW	1998–1999	3	0	0	0	2	—	—	—	—	—	
Lehtonen, Antero	(Finland)	F	1979–1980	65	9	12	21	14	—	—	—	—	—	
Leinonen, Mikko	(Finland)	F	1984–1985	3	0	1	1	2	1	0	0	0	0	
Leipsic, Brendan	(Canada)	LW	2019–2020	61	3	8	11	13	—	—	—	—	—	
Lemieux, Jean	(Canada)	D	1975–1978	64	13	25	38	4	—	—	—	—	—	
Leonard, Ryan*	(United States)	C	2024–Present	84	21	25	46	58	8	0	1	1	2	
Lepisto, Sami	(Finland)	D	2007–2009	14	0	5	5	18	—	—	—	—	—	
Leschyshyn, Curtis	(Canada)	D	1996–1997	2	0	0	0	2	—	—	—	—	—	
Lesuk, Bill	(Canada)	LW	1974–1975	79	8	11	19	77	—	—	—	—	—	
Lewington, Tyler	(Canada)	D	2018–2020	8	1	1	2	24	—	—	—	—	—	
Liljegren, Timothy*	(Sweden)	D	2025–Present	4	0	0	0	2	—	—	—	—	—	
Linden, Trevor	(Canada)	C	2000–2002	28	4	3	7	14	6	0	4	4	14	
Lofthouse, Mark	(Canada)	RW	1977–1981	141	31	30	61	42	—	—	—	—	—	
Lovsin, Ken	(Canada)	D	1990–1991	1	0	0	0	0	—	—	—	—	—	
Lowdermilk, Dwayne	(Canada)	D	1980–1981	2	0	1	1	2	—	—	—	—	—	
Lundrigan, Joe	(Canada)	D	1974–1975	3	0	0	0	2	—	—	—	—	—	
Lynch, Jack	(Canada)	D	1974–1979	233	18	57	75	202	—	—	—	—	—	
MacDermid, Paul	(Canada)	RW	1991–1993	87	11	13	24	123	7	0	1	1	22	
MacKinnon, Paul	(Canada)	D	1979–1984	147	5	23	28	91	—	—	—	—	—	
Majesky, Ivan	(Slovakia)	D	2005–2006	57	1	8	9	66	—	—	—	—	—	
Maillet, Philippe	(Canada)	F	2020–2021	2	0	0	0	0	—	—	—	—	—	
Malenstyn, Beck	(Canada)	LW	2019–2024	105	8	16	24	36	4	0	0	0	2	
Malgunas, Stewart	(Canada)	D	1995–1999	25	0	0	0	20	—	—	—	—	—	
Mangiapane, Andrew	(Canada)	LW	2024–2025	81	14	14	28	24	10	1	1	2	14	
Maltais, Steve	(Canada)	W	1989–1991	15	0	0	0	4	1	0	0	0	0	
Mantha, Anthony	(Canada)	RW	2020–2024	174	44	48	92	70	11	0	6	6	19	
Marshall, Jason	(Canada)	D	2000–2001	5	0	0	0	17	—	—	—	—	—	
Marson, Mike	(Canada)	F	1974–1979	193	24	24	48	228	—	—	—	—	—	
Martin, Grant	(Canada)	C	1985–1987	20	0	1	1	10	1	1	0	1	2	
Maruk, Dennis	(Canada)	F	1978–1983	343	182	249	431	365	4	1	1	2	2	
Mathieson, Jim	(Canada)	D	1989–1990	2	0	0	0	4	—	—	—	—	—	
May, Alan	(Canada)	LW	1989–1994	345	27	42	69	1189	39	1	2	3	80	
McAdam, Gary	(Canada)	F	1983–1984	24	1	5	6	12	—	—	—	—	—	
McEwen, Mike	(Canada)	D	1984–1985	56	11	27	38	42	5	0	1	1	4	
McGeough, Jim	(Canada)	C	1981–1982; 1984–1985	15	3	0	3	12	—	—	—	—	—	
McIlrath, Dylan*	(Canada)	D	2022–Present	39	0	4	4	50	4	0	0	0	10	
McKechnie, Walt	(Canada)	C	1977–1978	16	4	1	5	0	—	—	—	—	—	
McKenzie, Jim	(Canada)	LW	1999–2000	30	1	2	3	16	1	0	0	0	0	
McLean, Don	(Canada)	D	1975–1976	9	0	0	0	6	—	—	—	—	—	
McMichael, Connor*	(Canada)	C	2020–Present	315	67	87	154	130	18	5	3	8	4	
McTaggart, Jim	(Canada)	D	1980–1982	71	3	10	13	205	—	—	—	—	—	
Meehan, Gerry	(Canada)	LW	1975–1979	208	65	79	144	33	—	—	—	—	—	
Melanson, Dean	(Canada)	D	2001–2002	4	0	0	0	4	—	—	—	—	—	
Metropolit, Glen	(Canada)	C	1999–2003	101	10	37	47	26	3	0	0	0	2	
Mikkelson, Bill	(Canada)	D	1974–1975; 1976–1977	60	3	7	10	54	—	—	—	—	—	
Milano, Sonny*	(United States)	LW	2022–Present	147	30	34	64	32	4	0	0	0	0	
Millar, Mike	(Canada)	RW	1988–1989	18	6	3	9	4	—	—	—	—	—	
Miller, Kelly	(United States)	LW	1986–1999	940	162	246	408	436	100	17	30	47	59	
Miller, Kevin	(United States)	RW	1992–1993	10	0	3	3	35	—	—	—	—	—	
Miller, Kip	(United States)	C	2002–2004	138	21	60	81	26	5	0	2	2	2	
Mink, Graham	(United States)	RW	2003–2009	7	0	0	0	2	—	—	—	—	—	
Mironov, Dmitri	(Russia)	D	1998–2001	155	8	38	46	114	4	0	0	0	4	
Miroshnichenko, Ivan*	(Russia)	LW	2023–Present	52	5	8	13	8	1	0	0	0	0	
Mohns, Doug	(Canada)	D	1974–1975	75	2	19	21	54	—	—	—	—	—	C, 1974—75
Monahan, Hartland	(Canada)	F	1975–1977	159	40	56	96	72	—	—	—	—	—	
Moore, Barrie	(Canada)	LW	1999–2000	1	0	0	0	0	—	—	—	—	—	
Morrison, Brendan	(Canada)	C	2009–2010	74	12	30	42	40	5	0	1	1	2	
Morrison, Lew	(Canada)	RW	1974–1975	18	4	4	6	—	—	—	—	—		
Morrisonn, Shaone	(Canada)	D	2003–2010	377	9	53	62	405	26	0	2	2	16	
Motzko, Joe	(United States)	RW	2007–2008	8	2	2	4	0	—	—	—	—	—	
Muir, Bryan	(Canada)	D	2005–2007	98	11	22	33	114	—	—	—	—	—	
Mulhern, Ryan	(United States)	RW	1997–1998	3	0	0	0	0	—	—	—	—	—	
Mulvey, Paul	(Canada)	LW	1978–1981	187	29	37	66	487	—	—	—	—	—	
Murphy, Joe	(Canada)	RW	1999–2001	43	6	13	19	73	5	0	0	0	8	
Murphy, Larry^{†}	(Canada)	D	1983–1989	453	85	259	344	332	42	9	17	26	51	HHOF, 2004
Murray, Rob	(Canada)	C	1989–1991	58	2	10	12	77	9	0	0	0	18	
Murray, Terry	(Canada)	D	1981–1982	74	3	22	25	60	—	—	—	—	—	
Myhres, Brantt	(Canada)	LW	2000–2001	5	0	0	0	29	—	—	—	—	—	
Nelson, Jeff	(Canada)	C	1994–1996	43	1	7	8	18	3	0	0	0	4	
Nelson, Todd	(Canada)	D	1993–1994	2	1	0	1	2	4	0	0	0	0	
Ness, Aaron	(United States)	D	2015–2018	18	0	3	3	10	—	—	—	—	—	
Nicholson, Paul	(Canada)	LW	1974–1977	62	4	8	12	18	—	—	—	—	—	
Nikolishin, Andrei	(Russia)	C	1996–2002	407	58	113	171	174	32	1	15	16	18	
Niskanen, Matt^{†}	(United States)	D	2014–2019	390	29	127	156	194	70	2	20	22	33	SC 2018
Noel, Claude	(Canada)	F	1979–1980	7	0	0	0	0	—	—	—	—	—	
Norton, Brad	(United States)	D	2003–2004	16	0	1	1	17	—	—	—	—	—	
Norwood, Lee	(United States)	D	1981–1983	34	7	11	18	139	—	—	—	—	—	
Novotny, Jiri	(Czech Republic)	C	2006–2007	18	0	2	2	6	—	—	—	—	—	
Novy, Milan	(Czechoslovakia)	F	1982–1983	73	18	30	48	16	2	0	0	0	0	
Nycholat, Lawrence	(Canada)	D	2006–2007	18	2	6	8	12	—	—	—	—	—	
Nylander, Michael	(Sweden)	C	2002–2004; 2007–2009	186	37	91	128	100	9	3	2	5	10	
Oates, Adam	(Canada)	C	1996–2002	387	73	290	363	126	32	6	14	20	12	C, 1999–2001
O'Brien, Liam	(Canada)	C	2016–2018	17	1	1	2	28	—	—	—	—	—	
Oleksy, Steve	(United States)	D	2012–2015	62	3	16	19	86	7	0	1	1	4	
Orlov, Dmitry^{†}	(Russia)	D	2011–2023	686	60	196	256	279	74	2	21	23	24	SC 2018
Orpik, Brooks^{†}	(United States)	D	2014–2019	332	5	57	62	238	64	2	9	11	44	SC 2018
Osala, Oskar	(Finland)	LW	2008–2009	2	0	0	0	0	—	—	—	—	—	
Oshie, T. J.^{†}	(United States)	C	2015–2024	567	192	193	385	302	76	29	31	60	67	SC 2018
Ovechkin, Alexander*^{†}	(Russia)	LW	2005–present	1573	929	758	1687	857	161	77	70	147	83	CT 2006; TL 2008, 2009, 2010; HT 2008, 2009, 2013; AR 2008; CS 2018; RT 2008, 2009, 2013, 2014, 2015, 2016, 2018; SC 2018; C 2010–present
Pacioretty, Max	(United States)	LW	2023–2024	47	4	19	23	25	4	0	1	1	2	
Paddock, John	(Canada)	F	1975–1976	8	1	1	2	12	—	—	—	—	—	
Panik, Richard	(Slovakia)	RW	2019–2021	95	12	19	31	52	8	1	0	1	6	
Paradise, Bob	(United States)	D	1975–1977	70	0	13	13	62	—	—	—	—	—	
Patey, Doug	(Canada)	F	1976–1979	45	4	2	6	8	—	—	—	—	—	
Patrick, Craig	(United States)	C	1976–1979	75	9	18	27	6	—	—	—	—	—	
Paynter, Kent	(Canada)	D	1989–1991	14	1	2	3	33	4	0	0	0	10	
Peake, Pat	(United States)	RW	1993–1998	134	28	41	69	105	13	2	2	4	20	
Pearson, Rob	(Canada)	RW	1994–1995	32	0	6	6	96	3	1	0	1	17	
Peat, Stephen	(Canada)	RW	2001–2004; 2005–2006	130	8	2	10	234	—	—	—	—	—	
Peloffy, Andre	(France)	C	1974–1975	9	0	0	0	0	—	—	—	—	—	
Peluso, Anthony	(Canada)	RW	2017–2018	2	0	0	0	4	—	—	—	—	—	
Penner, Dustin	(Canada)	LW	2013–2014	18	1	2	3	2	—	—	—	—	—	
Perreault, Mathieu	(Canada)	C	2009–2013	159	33	37	70	70	11	1	3	4	0	
Pettersson, Jorgen	(Sweden)	F	1985–1986	47	8	16	24	10	8	1	2	3	2	
Pettinger, Matt	(Canada)	LW	2000–2008	334	52	47	99	169	—	—	—	—	—	
Phillips, Matthew	(Canada)	F	2023–2024	28	1	4	5	0	—	—	—	—	—	
Picard, Robert	(Canada)	D	1977–1980	230	42	114	156	308	—	—	—	—	—	
Pilon, Garrett	(Canada)	C	2020–2022	3	1	0	1	0	—	—	—	—	—	
Pinho, Brian	(United States)	C	2020–2021	2	0	0	0	0	2	0	0	0	0	
Pivonka, Michal	(Czech Republic)	C	1986–1999	825	181	417	598	478	95	19	36	55	86	
Poapst, Steve	(Canada)	D	1995–1996; 1998–1999	25	1	0	1	8	6	0	0	0	0	
Pocza, Harvie	(Canada)	LW	1979–1980; 1981–1982	3	0	0	0	2	—	—	—	—	—	
Podkonicky, Andrej	(Slovakia)	LW	2003–2004	2	0	0	0	0	—	—	—	—	—	
Polis, Greg	(Canada)	LW	1978–1980	47	13	11	24	25	—	—	—	—	—	
Pothier, Brian	(United States)	D	2006–2010	160	13	43	56	78	13	0	2	2	8	
Poti, Tom	(United States)	D	2007–2013	230	11	64	75	126	27	2	10	12	17	
Poulin, Dave	(Canada)	C	1993–1995	92	10	24	34	62	13	2	2	4	19	
Pronovost, Jean	(Canada)	RW	1980–1982	90	23	38	61	65	—	—	—	—	—	
Protas, Aliaksei*	(Belarus)	C	2021–Present	321	68	103	171	58	10	1	3	4	0	
Protas, Ilya*	(Belarus)	LW	2025–Present	4	1	3	4	2	—	—	—	—	—	
Purves, John	(Canada)	RW	1990–1991	7	1	0	1	0	—	—	—	—	—	
Pyatt, Nelson	(Canada)	C	1974–1976	93	32	27	59	35	—	—	—	—	—	
Quenneville, Joel	(Canada)	D	1990–1991	9	1	0	1	0	—	—	—	—	—	
Raddysh, Taylor	(Canada)	RW	2024–2025	80	7	20	27	18	7	0	1	1	4	
Raffl, Michael	(Austria)	LW	2020–2021	10	1	2	3	7	4	0	0	0	4	
Rausse, Errol	(Canada)	LW	1979–1982	31	7	3	10	0	—	—	—	—	—	
Rechlicz, Joel	(United States)	RW	2011–2012	3	0	0	0	0	—	—	—	—	—	
Reekie, Joe	(Canada)	D	1993–2002	515	11	64	75	688	48	3	4	7	57	
Ribble, Pat	(Canada)	D	1979–1982	98	5	22	27	147	—	—	—	—	—	
Ribeiro, Mike	(Canada)	C	2012–2013	48	13	36	49	53	7	1	1	2	10	
Richard, Mike	(Canada)	C	1987–1988; 1989–1990	7	0	2	2	2	—	—	—	—	—	
Richards, Mike	(Canada)	C	2015–2016	39	2	3	5	8	12	0	0	0	4	
Ridley, Mike	(Canada)	C	1986–1994	588	218	329	547	250	76	19	41	60	40	
Riley, Bill	(Canada)	W	1974–1975; 1976–1979	125	28	28	56	313	—	—	—	—	—	
Rissling, Gary	(Canada)	LW	1978–1980	37	3	4	7	176	—	—	—	—	—	
Robertson, Torrie	(Canada)	LW	1980–1983	62	10	13	23	208	—	—	—	—	—	
Robitaille, Louis	(Canada)	LW	2005–2006	2	0	0	0	5	—	—	—	—	—	
Rohloff, Todd	(United States)	D	2001–2002; 2003–2004	51	0	4	4	32	—	—	—	—	—	
Rouse, Bob	(Canada)	D	1988–1991	130	9	33	42	224	21	4	3	7	51	
Rowe, Tom	(United States)	RW	1976–1980; 1981–1982	191	56	58	114	315	—	—	—	—	—	
Roy, Matt*	(United States)	D	2024–Present	148	5	38	43	37	10	0	2	2	2	
Sabourin, Ken	(Canada)	D	1990–1992	47	1	4	5	129	11	0	0	0	34	
Sacco, Joe	(United States)	RW	1999–2002	213	14	30	44	149	11	0	0	0	6	
Salomonsson, Andreas	(Sweden)	LW	2002–2003	32	1	4	5	14	—	—	—	—	—	
Sampson, Gary	(Canada)	F	1983–1987	105	13	22	35	25	12	1	0	1	0	
Sandin, Rasmus*	(Sweden)	D	2022–Present	242	15	82	97	75	11	0	1	1	2	
Sanford, Zach	(United States)	LW	2016–2017	26	2	1	3	6	—	—	—	—	—	
Savage, Reggie	(Canada)	RW	1990–1991; 1992–1993	17	2	3	5	12	—	—	—	—	—	
Scamurra, Peter	(United States)	D	1975–1977; 1978–1980	132	8	25	33	59	—	—	—	—	—	
Schilling, Cameron	(United States)	D	2012–2015	6	0	0	0	4	—	—	—	—	—	
Schlegel, Brad	(Canada)	D	1991–1993	22	0	2	2	6	7	0	1	1	2	
Schmidt, Nate	(United States)	D	2013–2017	200	8	35	43	48	21	1	4	5	6	
Schofield, Dwight	(United States)	D	1985–1986	50	1	2	3	127	3	0	0	0	14	
Schultz, Jeff	(Canada)	D	2006–2013	399	11	64	75	133	29	0	1	1	14	
Schultz, Justin	(Canada)	D	2020–2022	120	7	43	50	26	11	1	2	3	8	
Seftel, Steve	(Canada)	LW	1990–1991	4	0	0	0	2	—	—	—	—	—	
Seiling, Rod	(Canada)	D	1974–1975	1	0	0	0	0	—	—	—	—	—	
Self, Steve	(Canada)	RW	1976–1977	3	0	0	0	0	—	—	—	—	—	
Semin, Alexander	(Russia)	LW	2003–2004; 2006–2012	469	197	211	408	450	51	15	19	34	46	
Sgarbossa, Michael	(Canada)	C	2019–2025	45	7	8	15	4	—	—	—	—	—	
Shand, David	(Canada)	D	1983–1985	85	5	16	21	158	8	0	1	1	13	
Shattenkirk, Kevin	(United States)	D	2016–2017	19	2	12	14	10	13	1	5	6	6	
Shaw, Brad	(Canada)	D	1998–1999	4	0	0	0	4	—	—	—	—	—	
Sheary, Conor	(United States)	LW	2020–2023	206	48	54	102	50	11	1	1	2	2	
Sheehy, Neil	(Canada)	D	1988–1991	131	4	9	13	470	21	0	1	1	130	
Siegenthaler, Jonas*	(Switzerland)	D	2018–2021	97	2	11	13	55	11	0	0	0	2	
Sill, Zach	(Canada)	C	2015–2016	10	1	0	1	2	—	—	—	—	—	
Siltala, Mike	(Canada)	RW	1981–1982	3	1	0	1	2	—	—	—	—	—	
Simon, Chris	(Canada)	LW	1996–2003	320	72	79	151	66	28	3	1	4	54	
Sirois, Bob	(Canada)	RW	1975–1980	282	91	120	211	38	—	—	—	—	—	
Slaney, John	(Canada)	D	1993–1995	63	7	12	19	33	11	1	1	2	2	
Sloan, Tyler	(Canada)	D	2008–2011	99	4	13	17	50	4	0	1	1	0	
Smith, Craig	(United States)	C	2022–2023	22	5	1	6	4	—	—	—	—	—	
Smith, Dennis	(United States)	D	1989–1990	4	0	0	0	0	—	—	—	—	—	
Smith, Gord	(Canada)	D	1974–1979	286	9	30	39	276	—	—	—	—	—	
Smith, Greg	(Canada)	D	1985–1988	113	1	18	19	108	25	2	1	3	43	
Smith, Rick	(Canada)	D	1980–1981	40	5	4	9	36	—	—	—	—	—	
Smith-Pelly, Devante^{†}	(Canada)	RW	2017–2019	129	11	13	24	53	27	7	1	8	12	SC 2018
Snively, Joe	(United States)	F	2021–2024	27	6	5	11	2	—	—	—	—	—	
Sourdif, Justin*	(Canada)	RW	2025–Present	78	15	20	35	35	—	—	—	—	—	
Sprong, Daniel	(Netherlands)	RW	2020–2022	89	21	13	34	20	3	0	1	1	4	
Stanton, Ryan	(Canada)	D	2015–2016	1	0	0	0	2	—	—	—	—	—	
Stapleton, Brian	(Canada)	RW	1975–1976	1	0	0	0	0	—	—	—	—	—	
Steckel, Dave	(United States)	C	2005–2011	291	23	35	58	113	24	4	3	7	8	
Stephenson, Chandler^{†}	(Canada)	C	2015–2020	168	14	19	33	16	30	2	5	7	10	SC 2018
Strome, Dylan*	(Canada)	C	2022–Present	325	98	174	272	126	14	3	10	13	2	
Stevens, Scott^{†}	(Canada)	D	1982–1990	601	98	331	429	1628	67	9	44	53	180	HHOF, 2007
Stewart, Blair	(Canada)	F	1974–1979	163	26	29	55	257	—	—	—	—	—	
Stoa, Ryan	(United States)	LW	2013–2014	3	0	0	0	0	—	—	—	—	—	
Stoltz, Roland	(Sweden)	D	1981–1982	14	2	2	4	14	—	—	—	—	—	
Sturm, Marco	(Germany)	LW	2010–2011	18	1	6	7	6	9	1	2	3	4	
Strachan, Tyson	(Canada)	D	2013–2014	18	0	2	2	28	—	—	—	—	—	
Stroshein, Garret	(Canada)	W	2003–2004	3	0	0	0	14	—	—	—	—	—	
Sundstrom, Peter	(Sweden)	F	1987–1989	111	12	19	31	48	14	2	0	2	6	
Sutherby, Brian	(Canada)	C	2001–2008	259	26	35	61	281	5	0	0	0	10	
Svejkovsky, Jaroslav	(Czech Republic)	LW	1996–2000	84	18	14	32	28	1	0	0	0	2	
Svensson, Leif	(Sweden)	D	1978–1980	121	6	40	46	49	—	—	—	—	—	
Sykora, Petr	(Czech Republic)	C	2005–2006	10	2	2	4	6	—	—	—	—	—	
Tatarinov, Mikhail	(Soviet Union)	D	1990–1991	65	8	15	23	82	—	—	—	—	—	
Taylor, Mark	(Canada)	F	1984–1986	39	3	2	5	6	3	0	0	0	0	
Tenute, Joey	(Canada)	C	2005–2006	1	0	0	0	0	—	—	—	—	—	
Tezikov, Alexei	(Russia)	D	1998–2000	28	1	1	2	2	—	—	—	—	—	
Theberge, Greg	(Canada)	D	1979–1984	153	15	63	78	73	4	0	1	1	0	
Thomson, Jim	(Canada)	RW	1986–1987; 1988–1989	24	2	0	2	88	—	—	—	—	—	
Tikkanen, Esa	(Finland)	LW	1997–1998	20	2	10	12	2	21	3	3	6	20	
Tinordi, Mark	(Canada)	D	1994–1999	264	16	40	56	449	28	1	2	3	60	
Tippett, Dave	(Canada)	LW	1990–1992	91	8	19	27	40	17	2	4	6	8	
Tocchet, Rick	(Canada)	RW	1996–1997	13	5	5	10	31	—	—	—	—	—	
Toms, Jeff	(Canada)	LW	1997–2000	74	5	11	16	14	1	0	0	0	0	
Tookey, Tim	(Canada)	C	1980–1982	57	18	21	39	53	—	—	—	—	—	
Tremblay, Brent	(Canada)	D	1978–1980	10	1	0	1	6	—	—	—	—	—	
Trineyev, Bogdan*	(Russia)	RW	2025–Present	2	0	0	0	0	—	—	—	—	—	
Tucker, John	(Canada)	C	1989–1990	38	9	19	28	10	12	1	7	8	0	
Turcotte, Alfie	(United States)	C	1989–1991	10	1	3	4	0	—	—	—	—	—	
Tutt, Brian	(Canada)	D	1989–1990	7	1	0	1	2	—	—	—	—	—	
Tvrdon, Roman	(Slovakia)	LW	2003–2004	9	0	1	1	4	—	—	—	—	—	
Ulanov, Igor	(Russia)	D	1994–1995	3	0	1	1	2	2	0	0	0	4	
Urbom, Alexander	(Sweden)	D	2013–2014	20	1	1	2	19	—	—	—	—	—	
Ustorf, Stefan	(Germany)	C	1995–1997	54	7	10	17	16	5	0	0	0	0	
Valentine, Chris	(Canada)	F	1981–1984	105	43	52	95	127	2	0	0	0	4	
van Riemsdyk, Trevor*	(United States)	D	2020–Present	387	13	79	92	127	19	1	3	4	4	
Vecchione, Mike	(United States)	RW	2021–2022	1	0	0	0	0	—	—	—	—	—	
Veitch, Darren	(Canada)	D	1980–1986	319	25	118	143	181	10	0	2	2	19	
Verot, Darcy	(Canada)	LW	2003–2004	37	0	2	2	135	—	—	—	—	—	
Ververgaert, Dennis	(Canada)	RW	1980–1981	79	14	27	41	40	—	—	—	—	—	
Volchkov, Alexandre	(Russia)	RW	1999–2000	3	0	0	0	0	—	—	—	—	—	
Volpatti, Aaron	(Canada)	LW	2012–2015	60	2	1	3	56	—	—	—	—	—	
Vrana, Jakub^{†}	(Czech Republic)	LW	2016–2021; 2024–2025	310	83	85	168	73	38	3	5	8	10	SC 2018
Walker, Howard	(Canada)	D	1980–1982	80	2	12	14	126	—	—	—	—	—	
Walker, Nathan^{†}	(Australia)	LW	2017–2019	10	1	1	2	6	1	0	1	1	0	SC 2018
Walker, Scott	(Canada)	RW	2009–2010	9	2	1	3	9	1	0	0	0	0	
Walter, Ryan	(Canada)	C	1978–1982	307	114	163	277	468	—	—	—	—	—	C, 1979—82
Ward, Joel	(Canada)	RW	2012–2015	276	57	64	121	94	35	5	13	18	14	
Watson, Bryan	(Canada)	D	1976–1979	155	4	26	30	294	—	—	—	—	—	
Weber, Mike	(United States)	D	2015–2016	10	0	0	0	28	2	0	0	0	0	
Wellman, Casey	(United States)	C	2013–2014	13	2	1	3	0	—	—	—	—	—	
Wey, Patrick	(United States)	D	2013–2014	9	0	3	3	5	—	—	—	—	—	
White, Tony	(Canada)	LW	1974–1978	158	37	28	65	100	—	—	—	—	—	
Whitfield, Trent	(Canada)	C	1999–2004	143	9	11	20	83	14	0	0	0	12	
Wickenheiser, Doug	(Canada)	C	1988–1990	43	3	13	16	24	5	0	0	0	2	
Wideman, Dennis	(Canada)	D	2010–2012	96	12	41	53	52	14	0	3	3	2	
Wilson, Tom*^{†}	(Canada)	RW	2012–present	907	209	248	457	1649	97	18	23	41	164	SC 2018
Williams, Justin	(Canada)	RW	2015–2017	162	46	54	100	86	25	6	10	16	20	
Williams, Tom	(United States)	RW	1974–1976	107	30	49	79	18	—	—	—	—	—	
Willsie, Brian	(Canada)	RW	2003–2011	132	29	28	57	95	—	—	—	—	—	
Wilson, Kyle	(Canada)	C	2009–2010	2	0	2	2	0	—	—	—	—	—	
Winnik, Daniel	(Canada)	C/LW	2015–2017	92	14	16	30	71	25	0	0	0	4	
Witt, Brendan	(Canada)	D	1995–2006	626	20	63	83	1035	31	4	0	4	26	C, 2001–02
Wolski, Wojtek	(Canada)	LW	2012–2013	27	4	5	9	6	—	—	—	—	—	
Woolley, Jason	(Canada)	D	1991–1994	37	1	4	5	14	4	1	0	1	4	
Yake, Terry	(Canada)	C	1999–2001	47	6	8	14	20	3	0	0	0	0	
Yonkman, Nolan	(Canada)	D	2001–2002; 2003–2004; 2005–2006	50	1	7	8	90	—	—	—	—	—	
Zednik, Richard	(Slovakia)	RW	1995–2001; 2006–2007	289	69	65	134	213	22	7	3	10	21	
Zettler, Rob	(Canada)	D	1999–2002	90	1	10	11	130	11	0	0	0	2	
Zezel, Peter	(Canada)	C	1990–1991	20	7	5	12	10	—	—	—	—	—	
Zinger, Dwayne	(Canada)	D	2003–2004	7	0	1	1	9	—	—	—	—	—	
Zubrus, Dainius	(Lithuania)	RW	2000–2004; 2005–2007	331	86	130	216	260	12	2	2	4	6	
