= 1974 NHL expansion draft =

Player selection draft

General information
- Date: June 12, 1974

Overview
- League: National Hockey League
- Expansion teams: Kansas City Scouts; Washington Capitals
- Expansion season: 1974–75

The 1974 NHL expansion draft was held on June 12, 1974. The draft took place to fill the rosters of the league's two expansion teams for the 1974–75 season, the Kansas City Scouts and the Washington Capitals.

== Rules ==
Each expansion team was to select twenty-one players from the established clubs, three players from each of the fourteen existing teams: two goaltenders and nineteen skaters. Thus, a total of 42 players were selected.

Most of the existing teams could protect two goalies and fifteen skaters. First-year pros were exempt. The existing teams could lose only a maximum of three players, including a maximum of one goaltender. The Seals, Canadiens, Flyers, and Blues could exempt themselves from losing a goaltender because they had each lost a goalie in the 1970 Expansion Draft; however, the Canadiens and Blues chose to expose a goalie.

In the first two rounds, goaltenders were selected; skaters were selected in rounds three through twenty-one. After each of the first, third and subsequent rounds in which any of the established teams lost a player, the team in question moved one unprotected player to its protected list.

== Draft results ==
#	Player	Drafted from	Drafted by
1.	Michel Plasse (G)	Montreal Canadiens	Kansas City Scouts
2.	Ron Low (G)	Toronto Maple Leafs	Washington Capitals
3.	Peter McDuffe (G)	New York Rangers	Kansas City Scouts
4.	Michel Belhumeur (G)	Philadelphia Flyers	Washington Capitals
5.	Simon Nolet (RW)	Philadelphia Flyers	Kansas City Scouts
6.	Dave Kryskow (F)	Chicago Black Hawks	Washington Capitals
7.	Butch Deadmarsh (LW)	Atlanta Flames	Kansas City Scouts
8.	Yvon Labre (D)	Pittsburgh Penguins	Washington Capitals
9.	Brent Hughes (D)	Detroit Red Wings	Kansas City Scouts
10.	Pete Laframboise (LW)	California Golden Seals	Washington Capitals
11.	Paul Terbenche (D)	Buffalo Sabres	Kansas City Scouts
12.	Bob Gryp (F)	Boston Bruins	Washington Capitals
13.	Gary Coalter (C)	California Golden Seals	Kansas City Scouts
14.	Gord Smith (D)	Los Angeles Kings	Washington Capitals
15.	Gary Croteau (LW)	California Golden Seals	Kansas City Scouts
16.	Steve Atkinson (RW)	Buffalo Sabres	Washington Capitals
17.	Randy Rota (LW)	Los Angeles Kings	Kansas City Scouts
18.	Bruce Cowick (F)	Philadelphia Flyers	Washington Capitals
19.	Lynn Powis (C)	Chicago Black Hawks	Kansas City Scouts
20.	Denis Dupere (LW)	Toronto Maple Leafs	Washington Capitals
21.	John Wright (W)	St. Louis Blues	Kansas City Scouts
22.	Joe Lundrigan (D)	Toronto Maple Leafs	Washington Capitals
23.	Ted Snell (RW)	Pittsburgh Penguins	Kansas City Scouts
24.	Randy Wyrozub (C)	Buffalo Sabres	Washington Capitals
25.	Chris Evans (W)	Detroit Red Wings	Kansas City Scouts
26.	Mike Bloom (C)	Boston Bruins	Washington Capitals
27.	Bryan Lefley (D)	New York Islanders	Kansas City Scouts
28.	Gord Brooks (RW)	St. Louis Blues	Washington Capitals
29.	Robin Burns (LW)	Pittsburgh Penguins	Kansas City Scouts
30.	Bob Collyard (C)	St. Louis Blues	Washington Capitals
31.	Tom Peluso (W)	Chicago Black Hawks	Kansas City Scouts
32.	Bill Mikkelson (D)	New York Islanders	Washington Capitals
33.	Kerry Ketter (D)	Atlanta Flames	Kansas City Scouts
34.	Ron Anderson (RW)	Boston Bruins	Washington Capitals
35.	Norm Dube (W)	Los Angeles Kings	Kansas City Scouts
36.	Mike Lampman (LW)	Vancouver Canucks	Washington Capitals
37.	Richard Lemieux (C)	Vancouver Canucks	Kansas City Scouts
38.	Lew Morrison (RW)	Atlanta Flames	Washington Capitals
39.	Dave Hudson (C)	New York Islanders	Kansas City Scouts
40.	Steve West (C)	Minnesota North Stars	Washington Capitals
41.	Ken Murray (D)	Detroit Red Wings	Kansas City Scouts
42.	Larry Bolonchuk (D)	Vancouver Canucks	Washington Capitals
43.	Dennis Patterson (D)	Minnesota North Stars	Kansas City Scouts
44.	Murray Anderson (D)	Minnesota North Stars	Washington Capitals
45.	Ed Gilbert (C)	Montreal Canadiens	Kansas City Scouts
46.	Larry Fullan (LW)	Montreal Canadiens	Washington Capitals
47.	Doug Horbul (W)	New York Rangers	Kansas City Scouts
48.	Jack Egers (RW)	New York Rangers	Washington Capitals

== See also ==
- 1974 NHL amateur draft
- 1974–75 NHL season
