= John Wright (ice hockey) =

Canadian ice hockey player

- Born: November 9, 1948 (age 77) Toronto, Ontario, Canada
- Height: 5 ft 11 in (180 cm)
- Weight: 175 lb (79 kg; 12 st 7 lb)
- Position: Centre
- Shot: Right
- Played for: Vancouver Canucks; St. Louis Blues; Kansas City Scouts
- NHL draft: 4th overall, 1966; Toronto Maple Leafs
- Playing career: 1972–1975

John Gilbert Brereton Wright (born November 9, 1948) is a Canadian former professional ice hockey player who played 127 games over three seasons in the National Hockey League in the 1970s with the Vancouver Canucks, St. Louis Blues, and Kansas City Scouts. Prior to turning professional Wright spent four years at the University of Toronto, and also briefly played in the minor American Hockey League before retiring in 1975.

== Amateur career ==
Born in Toronto, Ontario, Wright was selected 4th overall in the 1966 NHL Amateur Draft by his hometown Toronto Maple Leafs after dominating local Junior B ranks. The following season, he joined the Toronto Marlboros of the Ontario Hockey Association, where he would play with a host of future NHL stars, including Brad Park, Brian Glennie and Gerry Meehan. In his rookie season, Wright helped lead the Marlboros to the Memorial Cup as Canada's top junior team, scoring 5 points in 9 games in the final tournament. The following season, he emerged as one of the team's top players, registering 64 points in 54 games.

However, rather than turn professional at the conclusion of his junior career, Wright chose instead to attend the University of Toronto, where he would pursue a degree in Health and Physical Education. During his time with the Varsity Blues men's ice hockey team, he would establish himself as one of the top players in CIAU history. The team would win 4 consecutive CIAU University Cup championships during his time there, with Wright becoming the only (as of 2021) player to be a two-time winner of the national tournament's Most Valuable Player award (1969, 1972). He was honoured as a CIAU All-Canadian in 1969 and 1972, and captained the Blues during his final two seasons.

Wright was also a member of the university's golf team, and in 1994 was elected to the University of Toronto Hall of Fame for his athletic achievements during his time there.

== Professional career ==
Wright had been drafted away from the Maple Leafs by the Vancouver Canucks in 1970, and joined the team in 1972 at the conclusion of his university career. Wright made the team as a rookie, and put together a fine 1972–73 season, finishing with 10 goals and 37 points in 71 games. This placed him 5th on the team in assists and 8th in scoring, and his 27 assists were at the time the most ever by a rookie Canuck forward.

However, Wright would get off to a sluggish start in 1973–74 with just 6 points in his first 20 games, and was dealt to the St. Louis Blues for Mike Lampman. His offensive struggles would continue in St. Louis, and he finished the season with 6 goals and 15 points in 52 games between Vancouver and St. Louis.

The following summer, Wright was selected by the Kansas City Scouts in the 1974 NHL Expansion Draft. However, he would play only 4 games for the Scouts, instead spending almost the entire season with their farm squad in the AHL. Following the season, he chose to retire from professional hockey.

Wright finished his career with 16 goals and 52 points, along with 67 PIM, in 127 NHL games.

== Career statistics ==
=== Regular season and playoffs ===
| | | | Regular season | | | | | Playoffs |
| Season | Team | League | GP | G | A | Pts | PIM | GP | G | A | Pts | PIM |
|---|---|---|---|---|---|---|---|---|---|---|---|---|
| 1965–66 | York Steel | MetJBHL | 36 | 26 | 18 | 44 | — | — | — | — | — | — |
| 1965–66 | Toronto Marlboros | OHA | 1 | 1 | 0 | 1 | 2 | — | — | — | — | — |
| 1966–67 | Toronto Marlboros | OHA | 48 | 9 | 27 | 36 | 18 | 17 | 0 | 4 | 4 | 6 |
| 1967–68 | Toronto Marlboros | OHA | 54 | 22 | 42 | 64 | 31 | 5 | 1 | 3 | 4 | 2 |
| 1968–69 | University of Toronto | CIAU | 15 | 18 | 19 | 37 | — | — | — | — | — | — |
| 1969–70 | University of Toronto | CIAU | 15 | 21 | 19 | 40 | — | — | — | — | — | — |
| 1970–71 | University of Toronto | CIAU | 15 | 11 | 13 | 24 | 18 | — | — | — | — | — |
| 1971–72 | University of Toronto | CIAU | 38 | 26 | 41 | 67 | 8 | — | — | — | — | — |
| 1972–73 | Vancouver Canucks | NHL | 71 | 10 | 27 | 37 | 32 | — | — | — | — | — |
| 1973–74 | St. Louis Blues | NHL | 32 | 3 | 6 | 9 | 22 | — | — | — | — | — |
| 1973–74 | Vancouver Canucks | NHL | 20 | 3 | 3 | 6 | 11 | — | — | — | — | — |
| 1974–75 | Providence Reds | AHL | 68 | 30 | 40 | 70 | 47 | 6 | 0 | 0 | 0 | 4 |
| 1974–75 | Kansas City Scouts | NHL | 4 | 0 | 0 | 0 | 2 | — | — | — | — | — |
| AHL totals | | | 68 | 30 | 40 | 70 | 47 | 6 | 0 | 0 | 0 | 4 |
| NHL totals | | | 127 | 16 | 36 | 52 | 67 | — | — | — | — | — |

| Preceded by Tom Martin | Toronto Maple Leafs first-round draft pick 1966 | Succeeded by Brad Selwood |
