= Larry Bolonchuk =

Canadian ice hockey player (born 1952)

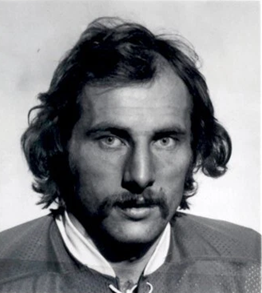
- Bolonchuk in 1978 photo
- Born: February 26, 1952 (age 74) Winnipeg, Manitoba, Canada
- Height: 5 ft 10 in (178 cm)
- Weight: 185 lb (84 kg; 13 st 3 lb)
- Position: Defence
- Shot: Right
- Played for: Washington Capitals; Vancouver Canucks
- NHL draft: 67th overall, 1972; Vancouver Canucks
- Playing career: 1972–1980

Kenneth Lawrence Mitchell Bolonchuk (born February 26, 1952) is a Canadian former ice hockey defenceman.

Born in Winnipeg, Manitoba, Bolonchuk was drafted by the Vancouver Canucks in 1972, Bolonchuk was left unprotected for the 1974 NHL Expansion Draft by the Vancouver Canucks, and was claimed by the Washington Capitals, where he played parts of three seasons until the end of the 1977–78 season. He signed as a free agent in 1978 with the Birmingham Bulls of the World Hockey Association but never played a game in the final 1978-79 WHA season. The majority of his career was spent in the International Hockey League, a minor professional league.

In 2010, Bolonchuk was employed as a senior fire prevention officer with the Winnipeg Fire Department.

== Career statistics ==
=== Regular season and playoffs ===
			Regular season					Playoffs
Season	Team	League	GP	G	A	Pts	PIM	GP	G	A	Pts	PIM
1970–71	Winnipeg Jets	WCHL	66	4	31	35	140	12	1	1	2	66
1971–72	Winnipeg Jets	WCHL	67	7	32	39	175	—	—	—	—	—
1972–73	Seattle Totems	WHL	59	2	9	11	97	—	—	—	—	—
1972–73	Vancouver Canucks	NHL	15	0	0	0	6	—	—	—	—	—
1973–74	Des Moines Capitols	IHL	71	6	27	33	166	10	2	4	6	37
1973–74	Seattle Totems	WHL	3	0	2	2	4	—	—	—	—	—
1974–75	Dayton Gems	IHL	58	9	21	30	139	14	0	13	13	31
1975–76	Washington Capitals	NHL	1	0	1	1	0	—	—	—	—	—
1975–76	Dayton Gems	IHL	77	4	39	43	174	15	0	11	11	59
1976–77	Washington Capitals	NHL	9	0	0	0	12	—	—	—	—	—
1976–77	Dayton Gems	IHL	71	2	21	23	124	4	0	2	2	6
1977–78	Washington Capitals	NHL	49	3	8	11	79	—	—	—	—	—
1977–78	Hampton Gulls	AHL	14	1	1	2	38	—	—	—	—	—
1977–78	Hershey Bears	AHL	19	0	7	7	12	—	—	—	—	—
1978–79	Binghamton Dusters	AHL	75	2	28	30	108	10	0	1	1	18
1979–80	Cincinnati Stingers	CHL	1	0	0	0	4	—	—	—	—	—
1979–80	Dayton Gems	IHL	73	7	32	39	139	—	—	—	—	—
IHL totals			350	28	140	168	742	43	2	30	32	133
NHL totals			74	3	9	12	97	—	—	—	—	—
