= Mike Bloom (ice hockey) =

Canadian ice hockey player (born 1952)

- Born: April 12, 1952 (age 74) Ottawa, Ontario, Canada
- Height: 6 ft 3 in (191 cm)
- Weight: 205 lb (93 kg; 14 st 9 lb)
- Position: Left wing
- Shot: Left
- Played for: Washington Capitals; Detroit Red Wings.
- NHL draft: 16th overall, 1972; Boston Bruins
- Playing career: 1972–1979

Michael Carroll Bloom (born April 12, 1952) is a Canadian former professional ice hockey player. He played in the National Hockey League (NHL) with the Washington Capitals and Detroit Red Wings between 1974 and 1977.

== Early life ==
Born in Ottawa, Ontario, Bloom played junior hockey with the St. Catharines Black Hawks.

== Career ==
Bloom was selected in the first round of the 1972 NHL entry draft, 16th overall, by the Boston Bruins, but never played for Boston before he was claimed by the Washington Capitals in the 1974 NHL Expansion Draft. Bloom also played for the Detroit Red Wings.

== Personal life ==
His father Carroll Bloom played in the CFL for the Ottawa Rough Riders, as well as the Saskatchewan Roughriders in the 1950s. Bloom also played for the Montreal Canadiens farm team in the 1950s.

== Career statistics ==
=== Regular season and playoffs ===
			Regular season					Playoffs
Season	Team	League	GP	G	A	Pts	PIM	GP	G	A	Pts	PIM
1968–69	North Bay Trappers	NOJHA	47	9	19	28	140	6	4	4	8	9
1969–70	St. Catharines Black Hawks	OHA	42	20	14	34	94	10	2	5	7	14
1970–71	St. Catharines Black Hawks	OHA	58	20	33	53	117	15	9	14	23	24
1971–72	St. Catharines Black Hawks	OHA	50	25	40	65	116	5	1	3	4	11
1972–73	Boston Braves	AHL	32	4	5	9	41	—	—	—	—	—
1972–73	San Diego Gulls	WHL	39	14	15	29	54	6	2	1	3	19
1973–74	San Diego Gulls	WHL	76	25	44	69	108	4	1	3	4	7
1974–75	Washington Capitals	NHL	67	7	19	26	84	—	—	—	—	—
1974–75	Detroit Red Wings	NHL	13	4	8	12	10	—	—	—	—	—
1975–76	Detroit Red Wings	NHL	76	13	17	30	99	—	—	—	—	—
1976–77	Detroit Red Wings	NHL	45	6	3	9	22	—	—	—	—	—
1976–77	Rhode Island Reds	AHL	12	8	2	10	12	—	—	—	—	—
1976–77	Kansas City Bluees	CHL	21	14	13	27	33	10	2	5	7	14
1977–78	Kansas City Red Wings	CHL	76	23	54	77	155	—	—	—	—	—
1978–79	San Diego Hawks	PHL	52	25	27	52	60	—	—	—	—	—
1979–80	Utrecht Rheem Racers	NED	14	4	9	13	—	—	—	—	—	—
1979–80	EHC Olten	NLB	—	—	—	—	—	—	—	—	—	—
NHL totals			201	30	47	77	215	—	—	—	—	—

Preceded by Terry O'Reilly	Boston Bruins first-round draft pick 1972	Succeeded by Andre Savard
