= Gord Smith (ice hockey) =

Canadian ice hockey player

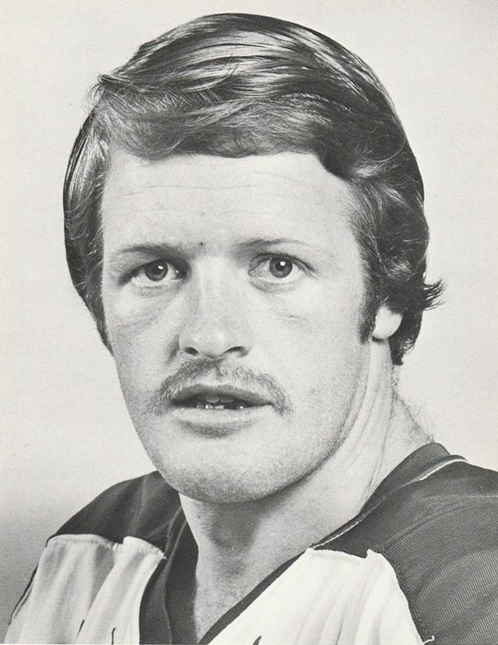
- Born: November 17, 1949 (age 76) Perth, Ontario, Canada
- Height: 5 ft 10 in (178 cm)
- Weight: 175 lb (79 kg; 12 st 7 lb)
- Position: Defence
- Shot: Left
- Played for: Washington Capitals; Winnipeg Jets
- NHL draft: 59th overall, 1969; New York Rangers
- Playing career: 1969–1983

Gordon John Smith (born November 17, 1949) is a Canadian former ice hockey player. He is the older brother of former New York Islanders goaltender Billy Smith.

== Career ==
Originally selected by the New York Rangers in the 1969 NHL entry draft, he played his first NHL game with the Washington Capitals after the 1974 NHL Expansion Draft. Smith spent five seasons with the Capitals before he was claimed by the Winnipeg Jets in the 1979 NHL Expansion Draft.

== Career statistics ==
=== Regular season and playoffs ===
			Regular season					Playoffs
Season	Team	League	GP	G	A	Pts	PIM	GP	G	A	Pts	PIM
1967–68	Brockville Braves	CJHL	—	—	—	—	—	—	—	—	—	—
1968–69	Cornwall Royals	MMJHL	—	—	—	—	—	—	—	—	—	—
1969–70	New Haven Blades	EHL	72	4	20	24	92	11	0	3	3	36
1969–70	Omaha Knights	CHL	—	—	—	—	—	5	0	0	0	8
1970–71	New Haven Blades	EHL	73	7	24	31	253	14	1	5	6	66
1971–72	New Haven Blades	EHL	74	3	33	36	188	7	1	5	6	18
1972–73	Springfield Kings	AHL	72	3	29	32	134	—	—	—	—	—
1973–74	Springfield Kings	AHL	75	13	54	67	118	—	—	—	—	—
1974–75	Washington Capitals	NHL	63	3	8	11	56	—	—	—	—	—
1974–75	Richmond Robins	AHL	15	1	4	5	23	—	—	—	—	—
1975–76	Washington Capitals	NHL	25	1	2	3	28	—	—	—	—	—
1975–76	Richmond Robins	AHL	50	2	13	15	80	8	0	4	4	28
1976–77	Washington Capitals	NHL	79	1	12	13	92	—	—	—	—	—
1977–78	Washington Capitals	NHL	80	4	7	11	78	—	—	—	—	—
1978–79	Washington Capitals	NHL	39	0	1	1	22	—	—	—	—	—
1978–79	Hershey Bears	AHL	33	1	16	17	54	4	0	2	2	6
1979–80	Winnipeg Jets	NHL	13	0	0	0	8	—	—	—	—	—
1979–80	Tulsa Oilers	CHL	64	5	16	21	55	3	0	0	0	2
1980–81	New Haven Nighthawks	AHL	58	1	11	12	94	4	0	0	0	2
1981–82	Springfield Indians	AHL	80	4	12	16	80	—	—	—	—	—
1982–83	Maine Mariners	AHL	35	0	8	8	49	17	0	3	3	21
AHL totals			418	25	147	172	632	33	0	9	9	57
NHL totals			299	9	30	39	284	—	—	—	—	—
