= Murray Anderson (ice hockey) =

Canadian ice hockey player (1949–2025)

- Born: August 28, 1949; The Pas, Manitoba, Canada
- Died: May 13, 2025 (aged 75)
- Height: 5 ft 10 in (178 cm)
- Weight: 175 lb (79 kg; 12 st 7 lb)
- Position: Defence
- Shot: Left
- Played for: Washington Capitals
- NHL draft: 44th overall, 1969; Montreal Canadiens
- Playing career: 1970–1977

Murray Craig Anderson (August 28, 1949 – May 13, 2025) was a Canadian ice hockey defenceman. He played 40 games in the National Hockey League with the Washington Capitals during the 1974–75 season. The rest of his career, which lasted from 1970 to 1977, was spent in the minor leagues.

== Career ==
As a junior player in the MJHL and WCHL for the Flin Flon Bombers, Anderson teamed with future NHL greats Reggie Leach and Bobby Clarke.

Anderson was drafted in 1969 by the Montreal Canadiens with the 44th overall pick, but spent his early career playing in the AHL. Following the 1972-73 season, Montreal traded him to the Minnesota North Stars with Tony Featherstone for cash. After 1973-74, Anderson's most productive season in professional hockey (nine goals and 34 assists), Minnesota left him unprotected and he was claimed by the Washington Capitals during the 1974 NHL Expansion Draft.

In Anderson's only NHL season, 1974-75, he played 40 games for the hapless expansion Capitals (8-67-5 for 21 points) tallying a single point on an assist in a 10-3 loss to the Chicago Black Hawks. Anderson then played another two seasons in the minors before retiring.

== Death ==
Anderson died on May 13, 2025, at the age of 75.

== Career statistics ==
=== Regular season and playoffs ===
			Regular season					Playoffs
Season	Team	League	GP	G	A	Pts	PIM	GP	G	A	Pts	PIM
1966–67	Selkirk Steelers	MJHL	47	3	13	16	82	—	—	—	—	—
1967–68	Flin Flon Bombers	WCHL	55	5	14	19	87	15	1	2	3	19
1968–69	Flin Flon Bombers	WCHL	53	17	30	47	120	18	0	6	6	0
1969–70	Flin Flon Bombers	WCHL	50	5	23	28	150	17	2	11	13	20
1970–71	Rochester Americans/Montreal Voyageurs	AHL	52	0	5	5	48	—	—	—	—	—
1971–72	Nova Scotia Voyageurs	AHL	64	11	6	17	35	15	2	3	5	2
1972–73	Nova Scotia Voyageurs	AHL	71	1	24	25	52	13	1	2	3	22
1973–74	New Haven Nighthawks	AHL	76	9	34	43	79	10	0	3	3	6
1974–75	Washington Capitals	NHL	40	0	1	1	68	—	—	—	—	—
1974–75	Richmond Robins	AHL	33	3	9	12	56	7	1	2	3	4
1975–76	Springfield Indians	AHL	75	3	21	24	62	—	—	—	—	—
1976–77	Tulsa Oilers	CHL	38	0	0	0	4	—	—	—	—	—
AHL totals			373	27	99	126	332	45	4	10	14	34
NHL totals			40	0	1	1	68	—	—	—	—	—

== Awards ==
- WCHL All-Star Team – 1970
