= Mike Lampman =

Canadian-born American ice hockey player

- Born: April 20, 1950 (age 76) Hamilton, Ontario, Canada
- Height: 6 ft 2 in (188 cm)
- Weight: 194 lb (88 kg; 13 st 12 lb)
- Position: Left wing
- Shot: Left
- Played for: Washington Capitals; Vancouver Canucks; St. Louis Blues
- NHL draft: 111th overall, 1970; St. Louis Blues
- Playing career: 1972–1977

Michael David Lampman (born April 20, 1950) is a Canadian-born American former professional ice hockey player. Lampman played four seasons for the University of Denver, and was selected in the 1970 NHL Amateur Draft by the St. Louis Blues. Making his professional debut in 1972, Lampman played 96 games in the National Hockey League over 4 seasons for the Blues, Vancouver Canucks, and Washington Capitals, and also spent time in the American Hockey League and Western Hockey League before retiring in 1977.

== Playing career ==
Lampman moved to Lakewood, California when he was twelve. He was the first Southern California-trained player drafted into the NHL. He played college hockey at the University of Denver.

Selected in the 1970 NHL entry draft by the St. Louis Blues, Lampman played parts of two seasons with the Blues before he was traded to the Vancouver Canucks. He was claimed by the Washington Capitals in the 1974 NHL Expansion Draft, where he played until he retired during the 1976–77 NHL season.

== Post-playing career ==
After retiring from hockey, Lampman moved to Hawaii, where he worked as a loan officer.

== Career statistics ==
=== Regular season and playoffs ===
			Regular season					Playoffs
Season	Team	League	GP	G	A	Pts	PIM	GP	G	A	Pts	PIM
1967–68	Marquette Iron Rangers	USHL	25	5	5	10	20	—	—	—	—	—
1968–69	University of Denver	WCHA	—	—	—	—	—	—	—	—	—	—
1969–70	University of Denver	WCHA	28	11	6	17	32	—	—	—	—	—
1970–71	University of Denver	WCHA	36	24	18	42	77	—	—	—	—	—
1971–72	University of Denver	WCHA	36	30	13	43	68	—	—	—	—	—
1972–73	St. Louis Blues	NHL	18	2	3	5	2	—	—	—	—	—
1972–73	Denver Spurs	WHL	49	34	19	53	88	5	0	3	3	0
1973–74	St. Louis Blues	NHL	15	1	0	1	0	—	—	—	—	—
1973–74	Denver Spurs	WHL	5	5	6	11	4	—	—	—	—	—
1973–74	Vancouver Canucks	NHL	14	1	0	1	0	—	—	—	—	—
1973–74	Seattle Totems	WHL	30	8	14	22	13	—	—	—	—	—
1974–75	Richmond Robins	AHL	36	4	5	9	35	6	1	2	3	8
1975–76	Washington Capitals	NHL	27	7	12	19	28	—	—	—	—	—
1975–76	Baltimore Clippers	AHL	35	13	24	37	24	—	—	—	—	—
1976–77	Washington Capitals	NHL	22	6	5	11	4	—	—	—	—	—
NHL totals			96	17	20	37	34	—	—	—	—	—
