= Pete Laframboise =

Canadian ice hockey player (1950–2011)

- Born: January 18, 1950 Ottawa, Ontario, Canada
- Died: March 19, 2011 (aged 61) Ottawa, Ontario, Canada
- Height: 6 ft 2 in (188 cm)
- Weight: 185 lb (84 kg; 13 st 3 lb)
- Position: Left wing/Centre
- Shot: Left
- Played for: California Golden Seals; Washington Capitals; Pittsburgh Penguins
- NHL draft: 19th overall, 1970; California Golden Seals
- Playing career: 1970–1979

Peter Alfred Laframboise (January 18, 1950 – March 19, 2011) was a Canadian professional ice hockey player. Laframboise played for the National Hockey League (NHL) California Golden Seals, Pittsburgh Penguins and Washington Capitals in the 1970s. He also played for the Edmonton Oilers in the World Hockey Association.

== Playing career ==
Born in Ottawa, Ontario, Laframboise played junior hockey for the Oshawa Generals and Ottawa 67's. He was selected by the California Golden Seals in the 1970 NHL entry draft and joined the Providence Reds for the 1970–71 season. He moved to the Baltimore Clippers in the 1971–72 season and made his NHL debut that season with the Seals. He played three seasons with the Golden Seals. He joined the Capitals for the 1974–75 season and was traded to Pittsburgh. The next season, he played for the Hershey Bears and did not play in the NHL again. He played two seasons with the Springfield Indians with a call-up to the Edmonton Oilers, then of the WHA, before a final season in 1978–79 with the Binghamton Dusters.

== Personal ==
After his playing career was over, Laframboise returned to Ottawa, where he founded the direct mailing firm Rideau Mailing Services in 1988. Laframboise died at his home in Ottawa. Laframboise is survived by his companion Cathy Leblanc and two sons, Jamie and Josh.

== Career statistics ==
=== Regular season and playoffs ===
			Regular season					Playoffs
Season	Team	League	GP	G	A	Pts	PIM	GP	G	A	Pts	PIM
1966–67	Oshawa Generals	OHA	1	0	0	0	0	—	—	—	—	—
1967–68	Ottawa 67's	OHA	35	6	5	11	36	—	—	—	—	—
1968–69	Ottawa 67's	OHA	47	31	39	70	98	—	—	—	—	—
1969–70	Ottawa 67's	OHA	54	26	46	72	68	—	—	—	—	—
1970–71	Providence Reds	AHL	64	13	19	32	36	10	0	2	2	4
1971–72	Baltimore Clippers	AHL	72	37	44	81	95	18	5	8	13	24
1971–72	California Golden Seals	NHL	5	0	0	0	0	—	—	—	—	—
1972–73	California Golden Seals	NHL	77	16	25	41	26	—	—	—	—	—
1973–74	California Golden Seals	NHL	65	7	7	14	14	—	—	—	—	—
1974–75	Washington Capitals	NHL	45	5	10	15	22	—	—	—	—	—
1974–75	Pittsburgh Penguins	NHL	35	5	13	18	8	9	1	0	1	0
1975–76	Hershey Bears	AHL	69	18	47	65	79	7	2	3	5	6
1976–77	Springfield Indians	AHL	53	18	50	68	87	—	—	—	—	—
1976–77	Edmonton Oilers	WHA	17	0	5	5	12	—	—	—	—	—
1977–78	Springfield Indians	AHL	68	20	50	70	73	4	1	1	2	2
1978–79	Binghamton Dusters	AHL	39	8	25	33	18	—	—	—	—	—
WHA totals			17	0	5	5	12	—	—	—	—	—
NHL totals			227	33	55	88	70	9	1	0	1	0

== Transactions ==
- Selected by Los Angeles Sharks in 1972 WHA General Player Draft, February 12, 1972.
- Claimed by Washington from California in Expansion Draft, June 12, 1974.
- Traded to Pittsburgh by Washington for Ron Jones, January 21, 1975.
- Signed as a free agent by Edmonton (WHA) after LA Sharks (WHA) franchise folded, May 1975.
- Traded to Birmingham Bulls (WHA) by Edmonton (WHA) with Dan Arndt and Chris Evans for Lou Nistico and Jeff Jacques, September 1977.

Source: Legends of hockey
