= Willie Marshall Award =

Award in the American Hockey League

The Willie Marshall Award is given to the American Hockey League's leading goal scorer for the regular season. The award was established in the 2003–04 season to honor Willie Marshall, the AHL's all-time leader in goals, assists, points and games played. Marshall is also the AHL's all-time leader in post-season scoring.

== Winners ==
Season	Player	Team
2003–04	Jeff Hamilton	Bridgeport Sound Tigers
2004–05	Michael Cammalleri	Manchester Monarchs
2005–06	Donald MacLean	Grand Rapids Griffins
2005–06	Denis Hamel	Binghamton Senators
2006–07	Brett Sterling	Chicago Wolves
2007–08	Jason Krog	Chicago Wolves
2008–09	Alexandre Giroux (1)	Hershey Bears
2009–10	Alexandre Giroux (2)	Hershey Bears
2010–11	Colin McDonald	Oklahoma City Barons
2011–12	Cory Conacher	Norfolk Admirals
2012–13	Tyler Johnson	Syracuse Crunch
2013–14	Zach Boychuk	Charlotte Checkers
2014–15	Teemu Pulkkinen	Grand Rapids Griffins
2015–16	Frank Vatrano	Providence Bruins
2016–17	Wade Megan	Chicago Wolves
2017–18	Valentin Zykov	Charlotte Checkers
2018–19	Carter Verhaeghe	Syracuse Crunch
2018–19	Alex Barre-Boulet	Syracuse Crunch
2019–20	Gerry Mayhew	Iowa Wild
2020–21	Cooper Marody	Bakersfield Condors
2021–22	Stefan Noesen	Chicago Wolves
2022–23	Andy Andreoff	Bridgeport Islanders
2023–24	Adam Gaudette	Springfield Thunderbirds
2024–25	Matej Blumel	Texas Stars
2025–26	Arthur Kaliyev	Belleville Senators

== Before the award ==
The following is a list of top goal scorers by season in the American Hockey League, prior to the institution of the Willie Marshall Award.

Season	Player	Team
1936–37	Bryan Hextall	Philadelphia Ramblers
1937–38	Phil Hergesheimer (1)	Cleveland Barons
1938–39	Phil Hergesheimer (2)	Cleveland Barons
1939–40	Norm Locking	Syracuse Stars
1940–41	Fred Thurier	Springfield Indians
1941–42	Louis Trudel (1)	Washington Lions
1942–43	Harry Frost	Hershey Bears
1943–44	Pete Horeck	Cleveland Barons
1944–45	Louis Trudel (2)	Cleveland Barons
1945–46	Joe Bell	New Haven Eagles
1945–46	Joe Bell	Hershey Bears
1946–47	Johnny Holota	Cleveland Barons
1947–48	Carl Liscombe (1)	Providence Reds
1948–49	Sid Smith	Pittsburgh Hornets
1948–49	Carl Liscombe (2)	Providence Reds
1949–50	Roy Kelly	Cleveland Barons
1950–51	Fred Glover	Indianapolis Capitals
1951–52	Steve Wochy	Cleveland Barons
1952–53	Ike Hildebrand	Cleveland Barons
1953–54	Lorne Ferguson	Hershey Bears
1954–55	Eddie Olson	Cleveland Barons
1955–56	Camille Henry	Providence Reds
1956–57	Paul Larivee	Providence Reds
1957–58	Dunc Fisher	Hershey Bears
1958–59	Ken Schinkel	Springfield Indians
1959–60	Stan Smrke	Rochester Americans
1960–61	Jim Anderson (1)	Springfield Indians
1961–62	Floyd Smith	Springfield Indians
1961–62	Barry Cullen	Buffalo Bisons
1962–63	Hank Ciesla	Cleveland Barons
1963–64	Jim Anderson (2)	Springfield Indians
1963–64	Yves Locas	Pittsburgh Hornets
1964–65	Len Lunde	Buffalo Bisons
1965–66	Dick Gamble	Rochester Americans
1965–66	Alain Caron	Buffalo Bisons
1966–67	Roger DeJordy	Hershey Bears
1967–68	Eddie Kachur	Providence Reds
1968–69	Guy Trottier (1)	Buffalo Bisons
1969–70	Guy Trottier (2)	Buffalo Bisons
1970–71	Doug Volmar	Springfield Kings
1971–72	Wayne Rivers	Springfield Kings
1972–73	Yvon Lambert	Nova Scotia Voyageurs
1973–74	Murray Kuntz	Rochester Americans
1974–75	Doug Gibson	Rochester Americans
1974–75	Barry Merrell	Rochester Americans
1974–75	Peter Sullivan	Nova Scotia Voyageurs
1974–75	Jerry Holland	Providence Reds
1975–76	Ron Andruff	Nova Scotia Voyageurs
1976–77	Pierre Mondou	Nova Scotia Voyageurs
1977–78	Richard Grenier	Binghamton Dusters
1978–79	Rocky Saganiuk	New Brunswick Hawks
1979–80	Gordie Clark	Maine Mariners
1980–81	Tony Cassolato	Hershey Bears
1980–81	Mark Lofthouse	Hershey Bears
1981–82	Richard David	Fredericton Express
1982–83	Mitch Lamoureux	Baltimore Skipjacks
1983–84	Mal Davis	Rochester Americans
1984–85	Paul Gardner (1)	Binghamton Whalers
1985–86	Paul Gardner (2)	Rochester Americans
1986–87	Glenn Merkosky	Adirondack Red Wings
1987–88	Jody Gage	Rochester Americans
1988–89	Stephan Lebeau	Sherbrooke Canadiens
1989–90	John LeBlanc	Cape Breton Oilers
1990–91	Michel Picard	Springfield Indians
1991–92	Dan Currie	Cape Breton Oilers
1992–93	Chris Tancill	Adirondack Red Wings
1993–94	Patrik Augusta	St. John's Maple Leafs
1994–95	Steve Larouche	Prince Edward Island Senators
1995–96	Brad Smyth (1)	Carolina Monarchs
1996–97	Peter White	Philadelphia Phantoms
1997–98	Paul Brousseau	Adirondack Red Wings
1998–99	Jeff Williams	Albany River Rats
1999–00	Mike Maneluk	Philadelphia Phantoms
2000–01	Brad Smyth (2)	Hartford Wolf Pack
2001–02	Justin Papineau	Worcester IceCats
2001–02	Eric Boguniecki	Worcester IceCats
2002–03	Eric Healey	Manchester Monarchs
