= Fred Thurier =

Canadian ice hockey player

- Born: January 11, 1916 Granby, Quebec, Canada
- Died: November 20, 1999 (aged 83) Vero Beach, Florida, U.S.
- Height: 5 ft 11 in (180 cm)
- Weight: 160 lb (73 kg; 11 st 6 lb)
- Position: Centre
- Shot: Right
- Played for: New York Americans; Brooklyn Americans; New York Rangers
- Playing career: 1940–1952

Alfred Michel Thurier (January 11, 1916 in Ste-Anne-de-Stukely near Granby, Quebec – November 20, 1999 in Vero Beach, Florida) was a Canadian professional ice hockey centre. He played 80 games in the National Hockey League for the New York Americans/Brooklyn Americans and New York Rangers between 1940 and 1945. The rest of his career, which lasted from 1940 to 1952, was mainly spent in the minor American Hockey League.

== Playing career ==
Thurier played parts of three seasons with the New York Americans and Rangers during the 1940s. He was best known for his offensive output in the AHL. He led the AHL in scoring with the Springfield Indians during the 1940–41 season. For the 1942–43 and 1943–44 seasons Thurier was with the Canadian Army as part of the Second World War, and played on military teams in Montreal. He returned to the AHL after the war ended, and helped the Cleveland Barons to Calder Cup victories in 1948 and 1951. In 80 NHL games, Thurier recorded 25 goals and 27 assists for 52 points.

== Career statistics ==
=== Regular season and playoffs ===
			Regular season					Playoffs
Season	Team	League	GP	G	A	Pts	PIM	GP	G	A	Pts	PIM
1936–37	Montreal Sr. Canadiens	QSHL	22	12	6	18	20	2	0	0	0	4
1937–38	Springfield Indians	IAHL	46	10	9	19	18	—	—	—	—	—
1938–39	Springfield Indians	IAHL	36	11	8	19	21	3	0	0	0	0
1939–40	Springfield Indians	IAHL	54	28	32	60	27	3	2	1	3	12
1940–41	New York Americans	NHL	3	2	1	3	0	—	—	—	—	—
1940–41	Springfield Indians	AHL	41	29	31	60	36	3	0	1	1	0
1941–42	Brooklyn Americans	NHL	27	7	7	14	4	—	—	—	—	—
1941–42	Springfield Indians	AHL	22	20	24	44	6	5	2	5	7	2
1942–43	Buffalo Bisons	AHL	7	6	9	15	2	—	—	—	—	—
1942–43	Montreal Army	QSHL	13	8	5	13	6	7	3	2	5	6
1942–43	Montreal Army	MCHL	2	4	1	5	0	—	—	—	—	—
1943–44	Montreal Army	MCHL	1	0	0	0	0	—	—	—	—	—
1943–44	Buffalo Bisons	AHL	39	33	40	73	43	9	8	10	18	14
1944–45	New York Rangers	NHL	50	16	19	35	14	—	—	—	—	—
1945–46	Cleveland Barons	AHL	47	21	32	53	18	12	9	7	16	6
1946–47	Cleveland Barons	AHL	63	18	33	51	58	4	0	0	0	0
1947–48	Cleveland Barons	AHL	68	36	38	74	38	9	5	8	13	4
1948–49	Cleveland Barons	AHL	51	26	31	57	47	5	2	7	9	2
1949–50	Cleveland Barons	AHL	57	30	52	82	22	4	2	0	2	0
1950–51	Cleveland Barons	AHL	64	32	63	95	19	10	1	12	13	0
1951–52	Cleveland Barons	AHL	47	19	23	42	12	4	1	2	3	4
AHL totals			506	270	376	646	301	65	30	52	82	32
NHL totals			80	25	27	52	18	—	—	—	—	—

== Achievements and awards ==
- AHL First All-Star Team (1941)
- AHL Second All-Star Team (1942, 1951)
- AHL Hall of Fame (2020)
