= Dudley "Red" Garrett Memorial Award =

US ice hockey award

The Dudley "Red" Garrett Memorial Award is given each year to the player in the American Hockey League (AHL) determined to be the most outstanding rookie. The award is based on voting by the media and the players. It was named after Dudley "Red" Garrett, who played in the AHL before fighting and dying in World War II.

== Winners ==
Season	Player	Team
1947–48	Bob Solinger	Cleveland Barons
1948–49	Terry Sawchuk	Indianapolis Capitals
1949–50	Paul Meger	Buffalo Bisons
1950–51	Wally Hergesheimer	Cleveland Barons
1951–52	Earl Reibel	Indianapolis Capitals
1952–53	Guyle Fielder	St. Louis Flyers
1953–54	Don Marshall	Buffalo Bisons
1954–55	Jimmy Anderson	Springfield Indians
1955–56	Bruce Cline	Providence Reds
1956–57	Boris Elik	Cleveland Barons
1957–58	Bill Sweeney	Providence Reds
1958–59	Bill Hicke	Rochester Americans
1959–60	Stan Baluik	Providence Reds
1960–61	Chico Maki	Buffalo Bisons
1961–62	Les Binkley	Cleveland Barons
1962–63	Doug Robinson	Buffalo Bisons
1963–64	Roger Crozier	Pittsburgh Hornets
1964–65	Ray Cullen	Buffalo Bisons
1965–66	Mike Walton	Rochester Americans
1966–67	Bob Rivard	Quebec Aces
1967–68	Gerry Desjardins	Cleveland Barons
1968–69	Ron Ward	Rochester Americans
1969–70	Jude Drouin	Montreal Voyageurs
1970–71	Fred Speck	Baltimore Clippers
1971–72	Terry Caffery	Cleveland Barons
1972–73	Ron Anderson	Boston Braves
1973–74	Rick Middleton	Providence Reds
1974–75	Jerry Holland	Providence Reds
1975–76	Greg Holst	Providence Reds
1975–76	Pierre Mondou	Nova Scotia Voyageurs
1976–77	Rod Schutt	Nova Scotia Voyageurs
1977–78	Norm Dupont	Nova Scotia Voyageurs
1978–79	Mike Meeker	Binghamton Dusters
1979–80	Darryl Sutter	New Brunswick Hawks
1980–81	Pelle Lindbergh	Maine Mariners
1981–82	Bob Sullivan	Binghamton Whalers
1982–83	Mitch Lamoureux	Baltimore Skipjacks
1983–84	Claude Verret	Rochester Americans
1984–85	Steve Thomas	St. Catharines Saints
1985–86	Ron Hextall	Hershey Bears
1986–87	Brett Hull	Moncton Golden Flames
1987–88	Mike Richard	Binghamton Whalers
1988–89	Stephan Lebeau	Sherbrooke Canadiens
1989–90	Donald Audette	Rochester Americans
1990–91	Patrick Lebeau	Fredericton Canadiens
1991–92	Felix Potvin	St. John's Maple Leafs
1992–93	Corey Hirsch	Binghamton Rangers
1993–94	Rene Corbet	Cornwall Aces
1994–95	Jim Carey	Portland Pirates
1995–96	Darcy Tucker	Fredericton Canadiens
1996–97	Jaroslav Svejkovsky	Portland Pirates
1997–98	Daniel Briere	Springfield Falcons
1998–99	Shane Willis	Beast of New Haven
1999–00	Mika Noronen	Rochester Americans
2000–01	Ryan Kraft	Kentucky Thoroughblades
2001–02	Tyler Arnason	Norfolk Admirals
2002–03	Darren Haydar	Milwaukee Admirals
2003–04	Wade Dubielewicz	Bridgeport Sound Tigers
2004–05	Rene Bourque	Norfolk Admirals
2005–06	Patrick O'Sullivan	Houston Aeros
2006–07	Brett Sterling	Chicago Wolves
2007–08	Teddy Purcell	Manchester Monarchs
2008–09	Nathan Gerbe	Portland Pirates
2009–10	Tyler Ennis	Portland Pirates
2010–11	Luke Adam	Portland Pirates
2011–12	Cory Conacher	Norfolk Admirals
2012–13	Tyler Toffoli	Manchester Monarchs
2013–14	Curtis McKenzie	Texas Stars
2014–15	Matt Murray	Wilkes-Barre/Scranton Penguins
2015–16	Mikko Rantanen	San Antonio Rampage
2015–16	Frank Vatrano	Providence Bruins
2016–17	Danny O'Regan	San Jose Barracuda
2017–18	Mason Appleton	Manitoba Moose
2018–19	Alex Barré-Boulet	Syracuse Crunch
2019–20	Josh Norris	Belleville Senators
2020–21	Riley Damiani	Texas Stars
2021–22	Jack Quinn	Rochester Americans
2022–23	Tye Kartye	Coachella Valley Firebirds
2023–24	Logan Stankoven	Texas Stars
2024–25	Justin Hryckowian	Texas Stars
2025–26	Ilya Protas	Hershey Bears
