= F. G. "Teddy" Oke Trophy =

Ice hockey trophy

- Sport: Ice hockey
- Awarded for: North Division champions of the American Hockey League

History
- First award: 1926–27
- First winner: Syracuse Stars
- Most wins: Hershey Bears (9)
- Most recent: Laval Rocket

The F.G. "Teddy" Oke Trophy is awarded to the regular season champion of the American Hockey League's North Division. It is the oldest trophy awarded by the AHL, but it passed through two leagues previously. It is one of the oldest trophies in professional hockey. It is named after Teddy Oke, one of the founders of the Canadian Professional Hockey League (CPHL) in 1926, who presented it to the inaugural CPHL champion – the London Panthers.

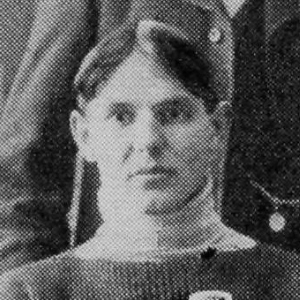
Teddy Oke

The 1928–29 CPHL champions, the Windsor Bulldogs, took the trophy with them when they defected to the International Hockey League (IHL) in 1929–30. The Oke Trophy remained the championship trophy of the IHL until 1936, when the league played an interlocking schedule with the Can-Am League, maintaining the two leagues while forming the umbrella of the International-American Hockey League (I-AHL), the precursor of the AHL.

The I-AHL operated as this "circuit of mutual convenience" for the IHL and Can-Am for its first two years, with the IHL's four surviving teams comprising the I-AHL's West Division. They continued the trophy's tradition in the new league when it was awarded to the West Division champions, the Syracuse Stars. The Stars went on to become the I-AHL's first champions by winning the Calder Cup.

The Oke Trophy remained the West Division championship through to the 1951–52 season. In the 1952–53 season, the AHL lost two teams, bringing an end to East and West divisions, making the Oke the trophy for the AHL team with the best regular-season record for a stretch of nine seasons (note that this would happen again in 1976–77, when the AHL contracted for a single season). When the AHL again expanded to East and West divisions in the 1961–62 season, the 1960–61 Oke Trophy champions, the Springfield Indians, took the trophy with them to the East Division, while a newly created John D. Chick Trophy became the West Division's trophy that same year. The AHL has realigned divisions several times since 1961–62, with the Oke Trophy following the previous winning team to the new division; this ended in the 2011–12 season, when the AHL expanded to six divisions and the Oke moved to a newly created division despite the 2010–11 winner not moving. This was repeated in the 2015–16 season, when the Oke did not follow the 2014–15 winner when the divisions contracted to four.

== Canadian Professional Hockey League champions (1927–1929) ==
| Season | Team | Win |
|---|---|---|
| 1926–27 | London Panthers | 1 |
| 1927–28 | Stratford Nationals | 1 |
| 1928–29 | Windsor Bulldogs | 1 |

== International Hockey League champions (1930–1936) ==
| Season | Team | Win |
|---|---|---|
| 1929–30 | Cleveland Indians | 1 |
| 1930–31 | Windsor Bulldogs | 2 |
| 1931–32 | Buffalo Bisons | 1 |
| 1932–33 | Buffalo Bisons | 2 (Note: The IHL's Buffalo Bisons are unrelated to the team of the same name that later won the Oke Trophy in the AHL – these two wins do not follow to the AHL Bisons.) |
| 1933–34 | London Tecumsehs | 2 (Note: The London Tecumsehs are the renamed London Panthers, the same team that was the first ever winner of the Oke Trophy, in the CPHL.) |
| 1934–35 | Detroit Olympics | 1 |
| 1935–36 | Detroit Olympics | 2 |

== American Hockey League (since 1937) ==
Total awards won (CPHL/IHL/AHL)
| Wins | Team | |
|---|---|---|
| 9 | Hershey Bears | |
| 8 | Cleveland Barons | |
| 5 | Maine Mariners | |
| 5 | Providence Reds | |
| 5 | Springfield Indians | |
| 4 | Springfield Falcons | |
| 3 | Buffalo Bisons (AHL) | |
| 3 | Indianapolis Capitals | |
| 3 | Nova Scotia Voyageurs | |
| 3 | Quebec Aces | |
| 3 | Sherbrooke Canadiens | |
| 3 | Toronto Marlies | |
| 3 | Wilkes-Barre/Scranton Penguins | |
| 3 | 2 | Adirondack Red Wings |
| 3 | 2 | Binghamton Senators |
| 3 | 2 | Bridgeport Sound Tigers |
| 3 | 2 | Buffalo Bisons (IHL) |
| 3 | 2 | Detroit Olympics |
| 3 | 2 | Fredericton Express |
| 3 | 2 | Hartford Wolf Pack |
| 3 | 2 | Laval Rocket |
| London Panthers/Tecumsehs | 2 | |
| New Brunswick Hawks | 2 | |
| Pittsburgh Hornets | 2 | |
| Providence Bruins | 2 | |
| Syracuse Crunch | 2 | |
| Worcester IceCats | 2 | |
| 1 | Albany River Rats | |
| 1 | Belleville Senators | |
| 1 | Boston Braves | |
| 1 | Cleveland Indians | |
| 1 | Cleveland Monsters | |
| 1 | Montreal Voyageurs | |
| 1 | Philadelphia Phantoms | |
| 1 | Rochester Americans | |
| 1 | St. Louis Flyers | |
| 1 | Syracuse Stars | |
| 1 | Utica Comets | |

Key

- ‡ = Eventual Calder Cup champions

| Awarded for | Season | Team | Win |
|---|---|---|---|
| West Division champions | 1936–37 | Syracuse Stars‡ | 1 |
| West Division champions | 1937–38 | Cleveland Barons | 1 |
| West Division champions | 1938–39 | Hershey Bears | 1 |
| West Division champions | 1939–40 | Indianapolis Capitals | 1 |
| West Division champions | 1940–41 | Cleveland Barons‡ | 2 |
| West Division champions | 1941–42 | Indianapolis Capitals‡ | 2 |
| West Division champions | 1942–43 | Buffalo Bisons‡ | 1 |
| West Division champions | 1943–44 | Cleveland Barons | 2 |
| West Division champions | 1944–45 | Cleveland Barons‡ | 3 |
| West Division champions | 1945–46 | Indianapolis Capitals | 3 |
| West Division champions | 1946–47 | Cleveland Barons | 4 |
| West Division champions | 1947–48 | Cleveland Barons‡ | 5 |
| West Division champions | 1948–49 | St. Louis Flyers | 1 |
| West Division champions | 1949–50 | Cleveland Barons | 6 |
| West Division champions | 1950–51 | Cleveland Barons‡ | 7 |
| West Division champions | 1951–52 | Pittsburgh Hornets‡ | 1 |
| AHL regular season champions | 1952–53 | Cleveland Barons‡ | 8 |
| AHL regular season champions | 1953–54 | Buffalo Bisons | 2 |
| AHL regular season champions | 1954–55 | Pittsburgh Hornets‡ | 2 |
| AHL regular season champions | 1955–56 | Providence Reds‡ | 1 |
| AHL regular season champions | 1956–57 | Providence Reds | 2 |
| AHL regular season champions | 1957–58 | Hershey Bears‡ | 2 |
| AHL regular season champions | 1958–59 | Buffalo Bisons | 3 |
| AHL regular season champions | 1959–60 | Springfield Indians‡ | 1 |
| AHL regular season champions | 1960–61 | Springfield Indians‡ | 2 |
| East Division champions | 1961–62 | Springfield Indians‡ | 3 |
| East Division champions | 1962–63 | Providence Reds | 3 |
| East Division champions | 1963–64 | Quebec Aces | 1 |
| East Division champions | 1964–65 | Quebec Aces | 2 |
| East Division champions | 1965–66 | Quebec Aces | 3 |
| East Division champions | 1966–67 | Hershey Bears | 3 |
| East Division champions | 1967–68 | Hershey Bears | 4 |
| East Division champions | 1968–69 | Hershey Bears‡ | 5 |
| East Division champions | 1969–70 | Montreal Voyageurs | 1 |
| East Division champions | 1970–71 | Providence Reds | 4 |
| East Division champions | 1971–72 | Boston Braves | 1 |
| East Division champions | 1972–73 | Nova Scotia Voyageurs | 1 |
| North Division champions | 1973–74 | Rochester Americans | 1 |
| North Division champions | 1974–75 | Providence Reds | 5 |
| North Division champions | 1975–76 | Nova Scotia Voyageurs‡ | 2 |
| AHL regular season champions | 1976–77 | Nova Scotia Voyageurs‡ | 3 |
| North Division champions | 1977–78 | Maine Mariners‡ | 1 |
| North Division champions | 1978–79 | Maine Mariners‡ | 2 |
| North Division champions | 1979–80 | New Brunswick Hawks | 1 |
| North Division champions | 1980–81 | Maine Mariners | 3 |
| North Division champions | 1981–82 | New Brunswick Hawks‡ | 2 |
| North Division champions | 1982–83 | Fredericton Express | 1 |
| North Division champions | 1983–84 | Fredericton Express | 2 |
| North Division champions | 1984–85 | Maine Mariners | 4 |
| North Division champions | 1985–86 | Adirondack Red Wings‡ | 1 |
| North Division champions | 1986–87 | Sherbrooke Canadiens | 1 |
| North Division champions | 1987–88 | Maine Mariners | 5 |
| North Division champions | 1988–89 | Sherbrooke Canadiens | 2 |
| North Division champions | 1989–90 | Sherbrooke Canadiens | 3 |
| North Division champions | 1990–91 | Springfield Indians‡ | 4 |
| North Division champions | 1991–92 | Springfield Indians | 5 |
| North Division champions | 1992–93 | Providence Bruins | 1 |
| North Division champions | 1993–94 | Adirondack Red Wings | 2 |
| North Division champions | 1994–95 | Albany River Rats‡ | 1 |
| North Division champions | 1995–96 | Springfield Falcons | 1 |
| New England Division champions | 1996–97 | Worcester IceCats | 1 |
| New England Division champions | 1997–98 | Springfield Falcons | 2 |
| New England Division champions | 1998–99 | Providence Bruins‡ | 2 |
| New England Division champions | 1999–00 | Hartford Wolf Pack‡ | 1 |
| New England Division champions | 2000–01 | Worcester IceCats | 2 |
| East Division champions | 2001–02 | Bridgeport Sound Tigers | 1 |
| East Division champions | 2002–03 | Binghamton Senators | 1 |
| East Division champions | 2003–04 | Philadelphia Phantoms | 1 |
| East Division champions | 2004–05 | Binghamton Senators | 2 |
| East Division champions | 2005–06 | Wilkes-Barre/Scranton Penguins | 1 |
| East Division champions | 2006–07 | Hershey Bears | 6 |
| East Division champions | 2007–08 | Wilkes-Barre/Scranton Penguins | 2 |
| East Division champions | 2008–09 | Hershey Bears‡ | 7 |
| East Division champions | 2009–10 | Hershey Bears‡ | 8 |
| East Division champions | 2010–11 | Wilkes-Barre/Scranton Penguins | 3 |
| Northeast Division champions | 2011–12 | Bridgeport Sound Tigers | 2 |
| Northeast Division champions | 2012–13 | Springfield Falcons | 3 |
| Northeast Division champions | 2013–14 | Springfield Falcons | 4 |
| Northeast Division champions | 2014–15 | Hartford Wolf Pack | 2 |
| North Division champions | 2015–16 | Toronto Marlies | 1 |
| North Division champions | 2016–17 | Syracuse Crunch | 1 |
| North Division champions | 2017–18 | Toronto Marlies‡ | 2 |
| North Division champions | 2018–19 | Syracuse Crunch | 2 |
| North Division champions | 2019–20 | Belleville Senators | 1 |
| North Division champions | 2020–21 | Hershey Bears | 9 |
| North Division champions | 2021-22 | Utica Comets | 1 |
| North Division champions | 2022-23 | Toronto Marlies | 3 |
| North Division champions | 2023-24 | Cleveland Monsters | 1 |
| North Division champions | 2024-25 | Laval Rocket | 1 |
| North Division champions | 2025-26 | Laval Rocket | 2 |
