= Les Cunningham Award =

Award of the American Hockey League

The Les Cunningham Award is given annually to American Hockey League's "Most Valuable Player" of the regular season, as voted on by AHL media and players.

The award was first presented in the 1947–48 season, is named after Les Cunningham, a five-time AHL All-Star and three-time Calder Cup champion who averaged better than a point per game over his 10-year playing career with the original Cleveland Barons. Upon his retirement, he was the AHL's career leader in points.

== Winners ==
Positions key
C	Centre	LW	Left wing	D	Defence	RW	Right wing	G	Goaltender

Player is still active in the AHL

Season	Winner	Team	Position	Win #
1947–48	Carl Liscombe (1)	Providence Reds	LW	1
1948–49	Carl Liscombe (2)	Providence Reds	LW	2
1949–50	Les Douglas	Cleveland Barons	C	1
1950–51	Ab DeMarco	Buffalo Bisons	C	1
1951–52	Ray Powell	Providence Reds	C	1
1952–53	Eddie Olson	Cleveland Barons	LW	1
1953–54	George Sullivan	Hershey Bears	C	1
1954–55	Ross Lowe	Springfield Indians	D	1
1955–56	Johnny Bower (1)	Providence Reds	G	1
1956–57	Johnny Bower (2)	Providence Reds	G	2
1957–58	Johnny Bower (3)	Cleveland Barons	G	3
1958–59	Rudy Migay	Rochester Americans	C	1
1958–59	Bill Hicke	Rochester Americans	RW	1
1959–60	Fred Glover (1)	Cleveland Barons	C	1
1960–61	Phil Maloney	Buffalo Bisons	C	1
1961–62	Fred Glover (2)	Cleveland Barons	C	2
1962–63	Denis DeJordy	Buffalo Bisons	G	1
1963–64	Fred Glover (3)	Cleveland Barons	C	3
1964–65	Art Stratton (1)	Buffalo Bisons	C	1
1965–66	Dick Gamble	Rochester Americans	LW	1
1966–67	Mike Nykoluk	Hershey Bears	C	1
1967–68	Dave Creighton	Providence Reds	C	1
1968–69	Gilles Villemure (1)	Buffalo Bisons	G	1
1969–70	Gilles Villemure (2)	Buffalo Bisons	G	2
1970–71	Fred Speck	Baltimore Clippers	C	1
1971–72	Garry Peters	Boston Braves	C	1
1972–73	Bill Inglis	Cincinnati Swords	C	1
1973–74	Art Stratton (2)	Rochester Americans	C	1
1974–75	Doug Gibson (1)	Rochester Americans	C	1
1975–76	Ron Andruff	Nova Scotia Voyageurs	C	1
1976–77	Doug Gibson (2)	Rochester Americans	C	2
1977–78	Blake Dunlop	Maine Mariners	F	1
1978–79	Rocky Saganiuk	New Brunswick Hawks	RW	1
1979–80	Norm Dube	Nova Scotia Voyageurs	LW	1
1980–81	Pelle Lindbergh	Maine Mariners	G	1
1981–82	Mike Kaszycki	New Brunswick Hawks	F	1
1982–83	Ross Yates	Binghamton Whalers	RW	1
1983–84	Garry Lariviere	St. Catharines Saints	D	1
1983–84	Mal Davis	Rochester Americans	RW	1
1984–85	Paul Gardner (1)	Binghamton Whalers	C	1
1985–86	Paul Gardner (2)	Rochester Americans	C	2
1986–87	Tim Tookey	Hershey Bears	C	1
1987–88	Jody Gage	Rochester Americans	RW	1
1988–89	Stephan Lebeau	Sherbrooke Canadiens	C	1
1989–90	Paul Ysebaert	Utica Devils	LW	1
1990–91	Kevin Todd	Utica Devils	C	1
1991–92	John Anderson	New Haven Nighthawks	LW	1
1992–93	Don Biggs	Binghamton Rangers	C	1
1993–94	Rich Chernomaz	St. John's Maple Leafs	RW	1
1994–95	Steve Larouche	Prince Edward Island Senators	C	1
1995–96	Brad Smyth	Carolina Monarchs	RW	1
1996–97	Jean-Francois Labbe	Hershey Bears	G	1
1997–98	Steve Guolla	Kentucky Thoroughblades	C	1
1998–99	Randy Robitaille	Providence Bruins	C	1
1999–00	Martin Brochu	Portland Pirates	G	1
2000–01	Derek Armstrong	Hartford Wolf Pack	LW	1
2001–02	Eric Boguniecki	Worcester IceCats	C	1
2002–03	Jason Ward	Hamilton Bulldogs	RW	1
2003–04	Jason LaBarbera	Hartford Wolf Pack	G	1
2004–05	Jason Spezza	Binghamton Senators	C	1
2005–06	Donald MacLean	Grand Rapids Griffins	C	1
2006–07	Darren Haydar	Chicago Wolves	RW	1
2007–08	Jason Krog	Chicago Wolves	C	1
2008–09	Alexandre Giroux	Hershey Bears	LW	1
2009–10	Keith Aucoin	Hershey Bears	C	1
2010–11	Corey Locke	Binghamton Senators	C	1
2011–12	Cory Conacher	Norfolk Admirals	LW	1
2012–13	Tyler Johnson	Syracuse Crunch	C	1
2013–14	Travis Morin	Texas Stars	C	1
2014–15	Brian O'Neill	Manchester Monarchs	RW	1
2015–16	Chris Bourque	Hershey Bears	LW	1
2016–17	Kenny Agostino	Chicago Wolves	LW	1
2017–18	Phil Varone	Lehigh Valley Phantoms	C	1
2018–19	Daniel Carr	Chicago Wolves	LW	1
2019–20	Gerry Mayhew	Iowa Wild	C	1
2020–21	T. J. Tynan	Colorado Eagles	C	1
2021–22	T. J. Tynan (2)	Ontario Reign	C	2
2022–23	Dustin Wolf	Calgary Wranglers	G	1
2023–24	Mavrik Bourque	Texas Stars	C	1
2024–25	Andrew Poturalski	San Jose Barracuda	C	1
2025–26	Michael DiPietro	Providence Bruins	G	1
