= Harry "Hap" Holmes Memorial Award =

US ice hockey trophy

The Hap Holmes Memorial Award is an ice hockey trophy awarded annually to the goaltenders of the American Hockey League (AHL) team with the lowest goals against average, and who have appeared in at least 25 regular season games.

Prior to 1972, only goaltenders with the lowest goals-against average who appeared in at least 50% of regular season games were eligible for recognition. The trophy is named after Hockey Hall of Fame inductee Hap Holmes.

== Award winners ==
Season	Player	Team
1947–48	Baz Bastien (1)	Pittsburgh Hornets
1948–49	Baz Bastien (2)	Pittsburgh Hornets
1949–50	Connie Dion	Buffalo Bisons
1950–51	Gil Mayer (1)	Pittsburgh Hornets
1951–52	Johnny Bower (1)	Cleveland Barons
1952–53	Gil Mayer (2)	Pittsburgh Hornets
1953–54	Gil Mayer (3)	Pittsburgh Hornets
1954–55	Gil Mayer (4)	Pittsburgh Hornets
1955–56	Gil Mayer (5)	Pittsburgh Hornets
1956–57	Johnny Bower (2)	Providence Reds
1957–58	Johnny Bower (3)	Cleveland Barons
1958–59	Bobby Perreault (1)	Hershey Bears
1959–60	Ed Chadwick	Rochester Americans
1960–61	Marcel Paille (1)	Springfield Indians
1961–62	Marcel Paille (2)	Springfield Indians
1962–63	Denis DeJordy	Buffalo Bisons
1963–64	Roger Crozier	Pittsburgh Hornets
1964–65	Gerry Cheevers	Rochester Americans
1965–66	Les Binkley	Cleveland Barons
1966–67	Andre Gill	Hershey Bears
1967–68	Bobby Perreault (2)	Rochester Americans
1968–69	Gilles Villemure (1)	Buffalo Bisons
1969–70	Gilles Villemure (2)	Buffalo Bisons
1970–71	Gary Kurt	Cleveland Barons
1971–72	Dan Bouchard	Boston Braves
1971–72	Ross Brooks	Boston Braves
1972–73	Michel Larocque	Nova Scotia Voyageurs
1972–73	Michel DeGuise	Nova Scotia Voyageurs
1973–74	Jim Shaw	Nova Scotia Voyageurs
1973–74	Dave Elenbaas (1)	Nova Scotia Voyageurs
1974–75	Ed Walsh (1)	Nova Scotia Voyageurs
1974–75	Dave Elenbaas (2)	Nova Scotia Voyageurs
1975–76	Ed Walsh (2)	Nova Scotia Voyageurs
1975–76	Dave Elenbaas (3)	Nova Scotia Voyageurs
1976–77	Ed Walsh (3)	Nova Scotia Voyageurs
1976–77	Dave Elenbaas (4)	Nova Scotia Voyageurs
1977–78	Bob Holland	Nova Scotia Voyageurs
1977–78	Maurice Barrette	Nova Scotia Voyageurs
1978–79	Pete Peeters	Maine Mariners
1978–79	Robbie Moore (1)	Maine Mariners
1979–80	Rick St. Croix	Maine Mariners
1979–80	Robbie Moore (2)	Maine Mariners
1980–81	Pelle Lindbergh	Maine Mariners
1980–81	Robbie Moore (3)	Maine Mariners
1981–82	Bob Janecyk	New Brunswick Hawks
1981–82	Warren Skorodenski	New Brunswick Hawks
1982–83	Brian Ford (1)	Fredericton Express
1982–83	Clint Malarchuk	Fredericton Express
1983–84	Brian Ford (2)	Fredericton Express
1984–85	Jon Casey	Baltimore Skipjacks
1985–86	Sam St. Laurent	Maine Mariners
1985–86	Karl Friesen	Maine Mariners
1986–87	Vincent Riendeau (1)	Sherbrooke Canadiens
1987–88	Vincent Riendeau (2)	Sherbrooke Canadiens
1987–88	Jocelyn Perreault	Sherbrooke Canadiens
1988–89	Randy Exelby	Sherbrooke Canadiens
1988–89	Francois Gravel	Sherbrooke Canadiens
1989–90	Jean-Claude Bergeron	Sherbrooke Canadiens
1989–90	Andre Racicot	Sherbrooke Canadiens
1990–91	David Littman (1)	Rochester Americans
1990–91	Darcy Wakaluk	Rochester Americans
1991–92	David Littman (2)	Rochester Americans
1992–93	Corey Hirsch	Binghamton Rangers
1992–93	Boris Rousson	Binghamton Rangers
1993–94	Olaf Kolzig	Portland Pirates
1993–94	Byron Dafoe	Portland Pirates
1994–95	Mike Dunham	Albany River Rats
1994–95	Corey Schwab	Albany River Rats
1995–96	Manny Legace	Springfield Falcons
1995–96	Scott Langkow	Springfield Falcons
1996–97	Jean-Francois Labbe (1)	Hershey Bears
1997–98	Jean-Sebastien Giguere	Saint John Flames
1997–98	Tyler Moss	Saint John Flames
1998–99	Martin Biron	Rochester Americans
1998–99	Tom Draper	Rochester Americans
1999–2000	Milan Hnilicka	Hartford Wolf Pack
1999–2000	Jean-Francois Labbe (2)	Hartford Wolf Pack
2000–01	Mika Noronen	Rochester Americans
2000–01	Tom Askey	Rochester Americans
2001–02	Martin Prusek	Grand Rapids Griffins
2001–02	Simon Lajeunesse	Grand Rapids Griffins
2001–02	Mathieu Chouinard	Grand Rapids Griffins
2002–03	Marc Lamothe	Grand Rapids Griffins
2002–03	Joey MacDonald	Grand Rapids Griffins
2003–04	Wade Dubielewicz	Bridgeport Sound Tigers
2003–04	Dieter Kochan	Bridgeport Sound Tigers
2004–05	Jason LaBarbera (1)	Hartford Wolf Pack
2004–05	Steve Valiquette	Hartford Wolf Pack
2005–06	Dany Sabourin	Wilkes-Barre/Scranton Penguins
2006–07	Jason LaBarbera (2)	Manchester Monarchs
2007–08	Nolan Schaefer	Houston Aeros
2007–08	Barry Brust	Houston Aeros
2008–09	Cory Schneider	Manitoba Moose
2009–10	Cedrick Desjardins	Hamilton Bulldogs
2009–10	Curtis Sanford	Hamilton Bulldogs
2010–11	Brad Thiessen (1)	Wilkes-Barre/Scranton Penguins
2010–11	John Curry	Wilkes-Barre/Scranton Penguins
2011–12	Ben Scrivens	Toronto Marlies
2012–13	Brad Thiessen (2)	Wilkes-Barre/Scranton Penguins
2012–13	Jeff Zatkoff (1)	Wilkes-Barre/Scranton Penguins
2013–14	Jeff Deslauriers	Wilkes-Barre/Scranton Penguins
2013–14	Eric Hartzell	Wilkes-Barre/Scranton Penguins
2014–15	Matt Murray	Wilkes-Barre/Scranton Penguins
2014–15	Jeff Zatkoff (2)	Wilkes-Barre/Scranton Penguins
2015–16	Peter Budaj	Ontario Reign
2016–17	Tristan Jarry	Wilkes-Barre/Scranton Penguins
2016–17	Casey DeSmith	Wilkes-Barre/Scranton Penguins
2017–18	Garret Sparks	Toronto Marlies
2017–18	Calvin Pickard	Toronto Marlies
2018–19	Edward Pasquale	Syracuse Crunch
2019–20	Troy Grosenick	Milwaukee Admirals
2019–20	Connor Ingram	Milwaukee Admirals
2020–21	Pheonix Copley	Hershey Bears
2020–21	Zachary Fucale	Hershey Bears
2021–22	Alex Lyon	Chicago Wolves
2022–23	Dustin Wolf	Calgary Wranglers
2023–24	Hunter Shepard	Hershey Bears
2023–24	Clay Stevenson	Hershey Bears
2024–25	Connor Hughes	Laval Rocket
2024–25	Cayden Primeau	Laval Rocket
2024–25	Brandon Halverson	Syracuse Crunch
2024–25	Matt Tomkins	Syracuse Crunch
2025–26	Sebastian Cossa	Grand Rapids Griffins
2025–26	Michal Postava	Grand Rapids Griffins
