= 1967–68 AHL season =

- League: American Hockey League
- Sport: Ice hockey
- Duration: October 11, 1967 – May 4, 1968
- Games: 72
- Teams: 8

Regular season
- F. G. "Teddy" Oke Trophy (East Division winner) John D. Chick Trophy (West Division winner): Hershey Bears Rochester Americans
- Season MVP: Dave Creighton
- Top scorer: Simon Nolet

Playoffs
- Champions: Rochester Americans
- Runners-up: Quebec Aces

AHL seasons
- 1966–67 1968–69

The 1967–68 AHL season was the 32nd season of the American Hockey League. Eight teams played 72 games each in the schedule. The league played a limited interlocking schedule with the Western Hockey League which was a repeat of the experiment two seasons earlier. The Louis A. R. Pieri Memorial Award is first awarded to the "outstanding coach" in the league's regular season. The Rochester Americans finished first overall in the regular season, and won their third Calder Cup championship in four years.

== Team changes ==
- The Pittsburgh Hornets cease operations, when the Pittsburgh Penguins join the National Hockey League as an expansion team.
- The Quebec Aces switch divisions from East to West.
- The Springfield Indians are renamed the Springfield Kings.

== Final standings ==
y– indicates team has clinched division and a playoff spot
x– indicates team has clinched a playoff spot
e– indicates team has been eliminated from playoff contention

Standings as of April 2, 1968

East Division	GP	W	L	T	Pts	GF	GA
y–Hershey Bears (BOS)	72	34	30	8	76	276	248
x–Springfield Kings (LAK)	72	31	33	8	70	247	276
x–Providence Reds (independent)	72	30	33	9	69	235	272
e–Baltimore Clippers (PIT)	72	28	34	10	66	236	255

West Division	GP	W	L	T	Pts	GF	GA
y–Rochester Americans (MNS/TOR)	72	38	25	9	85	273	233
x–Quebec Aces (PHI)	72	33	28	11	77	277	240
x–Buffalo Bisons (NYR)	72	32	28	12	76	239	224
e–Cleveland Barons (MTL)	72	28	30	14	70	236	255

== Scoring leaders ==
Note: GP = Games played; G = Goals; A = Assists; Pts = Points; PIM = Penalty minutes

Player	Team	GP	G	A	Pts	PIM
Simon Nolet	Quebec Aces	70	44	52	96	45
Bob Barlow	Rochester Americans	72	43	52	95	72
Jean-Guy Gendron	Quebec Aces	72	29	58	87	72
Andre Lacroix	Quebec Aces	54	41	46	87	18
Mike Nykoluk	Hershey Bears	72	19	66	85	30
Tom McCarthy	Baltimore Clippers	70	34	49	83	52
Roger DeJordy	Hershey Bears	68	25	23	48	4
Jim Paterson	Cleveland Barons	72	27	54	81	31

- complete list

== Calder Cup playoffs ==
Quarterfinals
E2	Springfield	1
E3	Providence	3
W2	Quebec	3
W3	Buffalo	2

Semifinals
E3	Providence	1
W2	Quebec	3
E1	Hershey	1
W1	Rochester	4

Calder Cup Final
W2	Quebec	2
W1	Rochester	4

- list of scores

== Trophy and award winners ==
Team awards

Calder Cup; Playoff champions:	Rochester Americans
F. G. "Teddy" Oke Trophy; Regular season champions, East Division:	Hershey Bears
John D. Chick Trophy; Regular season champions, West Division:	Rochester Americans

Individual awards

Les Cunningham Award; Most valuable player:	Dave Creighton – Providence Reds
John B. Sollenberger Trophy; Top point scorer:	Simon Nolet – Quebec Aces
Dudley "Red" Garrett Memorial Award; Rookie of the year:	Gerry Desjardins – Cleveland Barons
Eddie Shore Award; Defenceman of the year:	Bill Needham – Cleveland Barons
Harry "Hap" Holmes Memorial Award; Lowest goals against average:	Bobby Perreault – Rochester Americans
Louis A. R. Pieri Memorial Award; Coach of the year:	Vic Stasiuk – Quebec Aces

Other awards

James C. Hendy Memorial Award; Most outstanding executive:	John B. Sollenberger (posthumously)
James H. Ellery Memorial Award; Outstanding media coverage:	Jim West, Baltimore

== See also ==
- List of AHL seasons

Preceded by 1966–67 AHL season	AHL seasons	Succeeded by 1968–69 AHL season
