= Jim Hendy =

- Hockey Hall of Fame, 1968 (Builder)
- Born: May 6, 1905
- Died: January 14, 1961 (aged 55) Lakewood, Ohio, U.S.

James Cecil Valdamar Hendy (May 6, 1905 – January 14, 1961) was an ice hockey writer, historian, and statistician born in Barbados, British West Indies. A member of the Hockey Hall of Fame in the "Builder" category, he is credited with developing the statistical methods for tracking professional player and team performance. His methods have been in use since the 1930s.

== Writing and statistical work ==
Hendy spent time in Vancouver, British Columbia, before moving to New York City and working a number of odd jobs. He took a position submitting statistics and other information to Western Union for various sporting events at Madison Square Garden. His accuracy, graceful style, and general sports knowledge earned him a reputation as a quality writer with newspapers in the city. This reputation led him to a number of other writing posts for publications such as The New York Telegraph, Saturday Evening Post and McCall's.

In 1933, Hendy began publishing a statistical work entitled The Hockey Guide which he produced yearly until 1951. Due to the increase in demands on his time by his career, he transferred responsibility for his statistics to the National Hockey League (NHL). In the following years, Hendy took numerous jobs in hockey including president of the United States Hockey League, publicist for the NHL New York Rangers, and general manager of the American Hockey League Cleveland Barons.

== Reputation and honors ==
Hendy earned several honors with the Cleveland Barons as they won the AHL Calder Cup three times during his tenure from 1949 to 1961, including being named "Executive of the Year" twice by The Hockey News. He was elected to the Hockey Hall of Fame in 1968 and is listed as a major contributor to modern web sites such as the Internet Hockey Database. In 2015, he was named to the AHL Hall of Fame.

Hendy died of a heart attack on January 14, 1961.
