= 1966–67 AHL season =

- League: American Hockey League
- Sport: Ice hockey

Regular season
- F. G. "Teddy" Oke Trophy: Hershey Bears
- Season MVP: Mike Nykoluk
- Top scorer: Gord Labossiere

Playoffs
- Champions: Pittsburgh Hornets
- Runners-up: Rochester Americans

AHL seasons
- 1965–66 1967–68

The 1966–67 AHL season was the 31st season of the American Hockey League. Nine teams played 72 games each in the schedule. The Pittsburgh Hornets finished first overall in the regular season, and won their first Calder Cup championship since being resurrected in 1961–62. It would also be the final season for Pittsburgh in the AHL, replaced by the NHL's Penguins the next season.

== Final standings ==
Note: GP = Games played; W = Wins; L = Losses; T = Ties; GF = Goals for; GA = Goals against; Pts = Points;

East	GP	W	L	T	Pts	GF	GA
Hershey Bears (BOS)	72	38	24	10	86	273	216
Baltimore Clippers (NYR)	72	35	27	10	80	252	247
Quebec Aces (MTL)	72	35	30	7	77	275	249
Springfield Indians (independent)	72	32	31	9	73	267	261
Providence Reds (independent)	72	13	46	13	39	210	329

West	GP	W	L	T	Pts	GF	GA
Pittsburgh Hornets (DET)	72	41	21	10	92	282	209
Rochester Americans (TOR)	72	38	25	9	85	300	223
Cleveland Barons (independent)	72	36	27	9	81	284	230
Buffalo Bisons (independent)	72	14	51	7	35	207	386

== Scoring leaders ==
Note: GP = Games played; G = Goals; A = Assists; Pts = Points; PIM = Penalty minutes

Player	Team	GP	G	A	Pts	PIM
Gord Labossiere	Quebec Aces	72	40	55	95	71
Wayne Hicks	Quebec Aces	72	31	60	91	34
Willie Marshall	Baltimore Clippers	68	33	56	89	22
Roger DeJordy	Hershey Bears	72	52	32	84	10
Mike Nykoluk	Hershey Bears	72	16	68	84	26
Eddie Joyal	Rochester Americans	70	32	51	83	10
Dick Gamble	Rochester Americans	72	46	37	83	22
Jeannot Gilbert	Hershey Bears	72	26	57	83	48
Gene Ubriaco	Hershey Bears	69	38	43	81	50

- complete list

== Calder Cup playoffs ==
First round

- Pittsburgh Hornets defeated Hershey Bears 4 games to 1.
- Baltimore Clippers defeated Quebec Aces 3 games to 2.
- Rochester Americans defeated Cleveland Barons 3 games to 2.

Second round

- Pittsburgh Hornets earned second round bye.
- Rochester Americans defeated Baltimore Clippers 3 games to 1.

Finals

- Pittsburgh Hornets defeated Rochester Americans 4 games to 0, to win the Calder Cup.
- list of scores

== Trophy and award winners ==
Team awards

Calder Cup; Playoff champions:	Pittsburgh Hornets
F. G. "Teddy" Oke Trophy; Regular Season champions, East Division:	Hershey Bears
John D. Chick Trophy; Regular Season champions, West Division:	Pittsburgh Hornets

Individual awards

Les Cunningham Award; Most valuable player:	Mike Nykoluk - Hershey Bears
John B. Sollenberger Trophy; Top point scorer:	Gord Labossiere - Quebec Aces
Dudley "Red" Garrett Memorial Award; Rookie of the year:	Bob Rivard - Quebec Aces
Eddie Shore Award; Defenceman of the year:	Bob McCord - Pittsburgh Hornets
Harry "Hap" Holmes Memorial Award; Lowest goals against average:	Andre Gill - Hershey Bears

Other awards

James C. Hendy Memorial Award; Most outstanding executive:	Louis A.R. Pieri (posthumously)
James H. Ellery Memorial Award; Outstanding media coverage:	Roland Sabourin, Quebec

== See also ==
- List of AHL seasons

Preceded by 1965–66 AHL season	AHL seasons	Succeeded by 1967–68 AHL season
