= Roy Kelly =

Canadian ice hockey player

- Born: September 16, 1925; Calgary, Alberta, Canada
- Died: September 26, 2015 (aged 90); Invermere, British Columbia, Canada
- Height: 5 ft 9 in (175 cm)
- Weight: 155 lb (70 kg; 11 st 1 lb)
- Position: Right wing
- Shot: Left
- Played for: Cleveland Barons; St. Louis Flyers
- Playing career: 1943–1969

Roy Eldon Kelly (September 16, 1925 – September 26, 2015) was a Canadian professional hockey player who played 441 games in the American Hockey League, for the Cleveland Barons and St. Louis Flyers.

Kelly also had a coaching career, coaching the Calgary Stampeders and Drumheller Miners in the Alberta Senior Hockey League. His 1965–66 Miners team won the Allan Cup. He resided near Radium Hot Springs, British Columbia. Kelly died in 2015.
