= Bill Needham =

Canadian ice hockey player and coach (1932–2022)

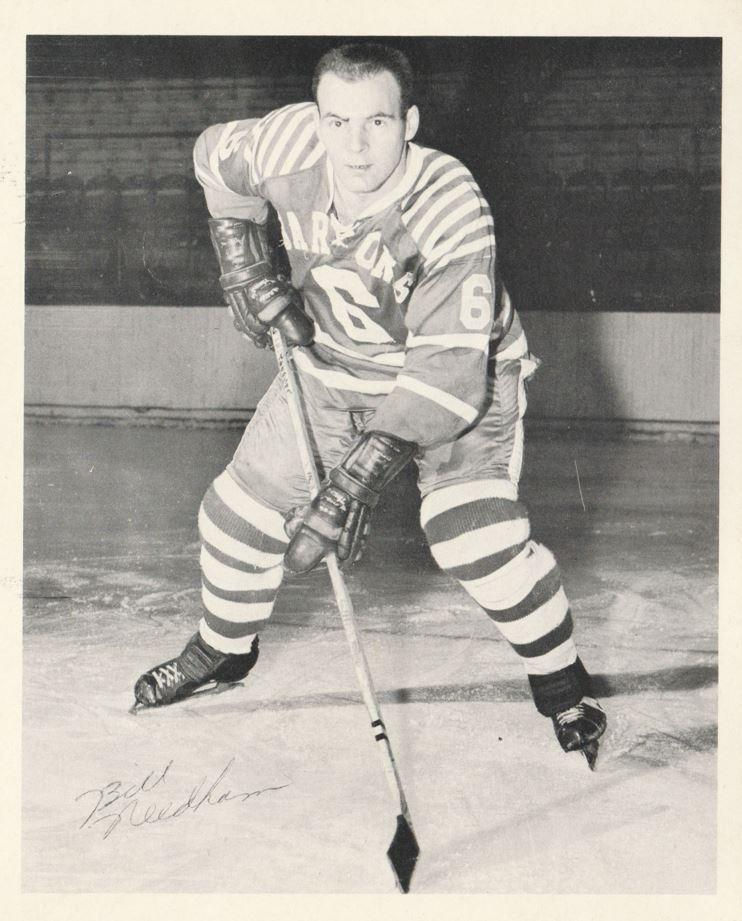
- Born: January 12, 1932 Kirkland Lake, Ontario, Canada
- Died: January 25, 2022 (aged 90)
- Height: 5 ft 9 in (175 cm)
- Weight: 175 lb (79 kg; 12 st 7 lb)
- Position: Wing
- Shot: Left
- Played for: IHL; Grand Rapids Rockets; Toledo Hornets; WHL; New Westminster Royals; AHL; Cleveland Barons
- Playing career: 1952–1972

Bill Needham (January 12, 1932 – January 25, 2022) was a Canadian professional ice hockey forward and coach.

== Playing career ==
Needham played for the following minor league teams during his career: Grand Rapids Rockets, Valleyfield Braves, Glace Bay Miners, New Westminster Royals, North Bay Trappers, Toledo Hornets and Cleveland Barons. He holds the franchise record of most games played for the Cleveland Barons, a total of 981, where he spent 15 seasons of his career. In this span, Needham scored 62 goals and 246 assists.

== Later life ==
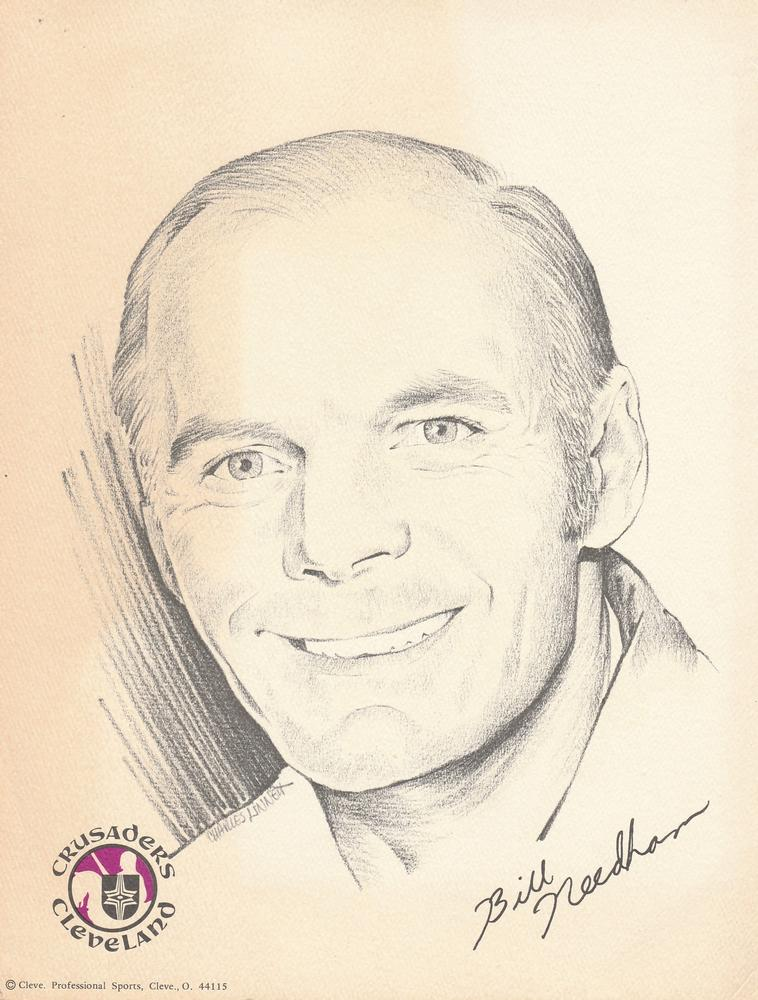
1972 sketch of Bill Needham, Cleveland Crusaders head coach

Needham assumed the role of Coach-Player for the 1971/72 Toledo Hornets, but suited up to play in less than half of their games that year. From 1972-1974 he was the Cleveland Crusaders head coach in the World Hockey Association Goaltender Gerry Cheevers emerged as a star for the Crusaders, after several All-Star years with the NHL Boston Bruins.

Needham died January 25, 2022, at the age of 90.

== Coaching record ==
=== WHA ===
Team	Year	Regular season						Postseason
Team	Year	G	W	L	T	Pts	Division rank	Result
Cleveland Crusaders	1972-73	78	43	32	3	89	2nd in East	Lost in Division Finals
Cleveland Crusaders	1973-74	78	37	32	9	83	3rd in East	Lost in Semifinals
WHA Total		156	80	64	12			

=== College ===
Statistics overview
Season	Team	Overall	Conference	Standing	Postseason
Massachusetts Redmen Independent (1950–1951)
1950–51	Massachusetts	0–7–0			
Massachusetts:		0–7–0			
Total:		0–7–0			
