= 1943–44 AHL season =

- League: American Hockey League
- Sport: Ice hockey

Regular season
- F. G. "Teddy" Oke Trophy: Cleveland Barons

Playoffs
- Champions: Buffalo Bisons
- Runners-up: Cleveland Barons

AHL seasons
- 1942–43 1944–45

The 1943–44 AHL season was the eighth season of the American Hockey League. Six teams played in a 54-game schedule. The Cleveland Barons won the F. G. "Teddy" Oke Trophy as the Western Division champions, while the Buffalo Bisons won their second consecutive Calder Cup.

== Team changes ==
- The Washington Lions cease operations.
- The Buffalo Bisons switch divisions from West to East.

== Final standings ==
Note: GP = Games played; W = Wins; L = Losses; T = Ties; GF = Goals for; GA = Goals against; Pts = Points;

East	GP	W	L	T	Pts	GF	GA
Hershey Bears (independent)	54	30	16	8	68	181	133
Buffalo Bisons (independent)	54	25	16	13	63	201	168
Providence Reds^{†} (independent)	52	11	36	5	27	126	214

West	GP	W	L	T	Pts	GF	GA
Cleveland Barons (independent)	54	33	14	7	73	224	176
Indianapolis Capitals (DET)	54	20	18	16	56	156	156
Pittsburgh Hornets^{†} (independent)	52	12	31	9	33	140	181

^{†}The final two regular season games between Providence and Pittsburgh had no effect in the standings, and were cancelled.

== Scoring leaders ==
Note: GP = Games played; G = Goals; A = Assists; Pts = Points; PIM = Penalty minutes

Player	Team	GP	G	A	Pts	PIM
Tom Burlington	Cleveland Barons	52	33	49	82	17
Fred Hunt	Buffalo Bisons	52	27	53	80	29
Les Cunningham	Cleveland Barons	52	26	52	78	13
Louis Trudel	Cleveland Barons	52	29	47	76	13
Fred Thurier	Buffalo Bisons	39	33	40	73	43
Earl Bartholomew	Cleveland Barons	52	20	47	67	19
Pete Horeck	Cleveland Barons	54	34	29	63	29
Larry Thibeault	Buffalo Bisons	51	18	45	63	46
Bill Thomson	Indianapolis Capitals	45	20	38	58	6
Jim O'Neill	Hershey Bears	54	20	33	53	18

- complete list

== Calder Cup playoffs ==
League Semi-Finals
E1	Hershey	3
W1	Cleveland	4
E2	Buffalo	4
W2	Indianapolis	1

Calder Cup Final
W1	Cleveland	0
E2	Buffalo	4

== See also ==
- List of AHL seasons

Preceded by 1942–43 AHL season	AHL seasons	Succeeded by 1944–45 AHL season
