= 1976–77 AHL season =

- League: American Hockey League
- Sport: Ice hockey

Regular season
- F. G. "Teddy" Oke Trophy: Nova Scotia Voyageurs
- Season MVP: Doug Gibson
- Top scorer: Andre Peloffy

Playoffs
- Champions: Nova Scotia Voyageurs
- Runners-up: Rochester Americans

AHL seasons
- 1975–76 1977–78

The 1976–77 AHL season was the 41st season of the American Hockey League. The league lost two teams, and divisions were dissolved. Six teams played 80 games each in the schedule. The F. G. "Teddy" Oke Trophy is awarded for first place in the regular season, and the John D. Chick Trophy is not awarded. The Nova Scotia Voyageurs repeated as first overall in the regular season and won their third Calder Cup championship.

== Team changes ==
- The Richmond Robins cease operations.
- The Baltimore Clippers transfer to the Southern Hockey League.
- The Providence Reds are renamed the Rhode Island Reds.

== Final standings ==
Note: GP = Games played; W = Wins; L = Losses; T = Ties; GF = Goals for; GA = Goals against; Pts = Points;

Overall	GP	W	L	T	Pts	GF	GA
Nova Scotia Voyageurs (MTL)	80	52	22	6	110	308	225
New Haven Nighthawks (MNS/NYR)	80	43	31	6	92	333	287
Rochester Americans (BOS)	80	42	33	5	89	320	273
Hershey Bears (BUF/PIT)	80	36	38	6	78	282	293
Springfield Indians (PHI/WSH)	80	28	51	1	57	302	390
Rhode Island Reds (CLR)	80	25	51	4	54	282	359

== Scoring leaders ==
Note: GP = Games played; G = Goals; A = Assists; Pts = Points; PIM = Penalty minutes

Player	Team	GP	G	A	Pts	PIM
Andre Peloffy	Springfield Indians	79	42	57	99	106
Ed Johnstone	New Haven Nighthawks	80	40	58	98	79
Doug Gibson	Rochester Americans	78	41	56	97	11
Tom Colley	New Haven Nighthawks	80	37	56	93	36
Blake Dunlop	New Haven Nighthawks	76	33	60	93	16
Pierre Mondou	Nova Scotia Voyageurs	71	44	45	89	21
Walt Ledingham	Rhode Island Reds	73	29	57	86	20
Rod Schutt	Nova Scotia Voyageurs	80	33	51	84	56

- complete list

== Calder Cup playoffs ==
Semifinals
1	Nova Scotia	4
4	Hershey	2
2	New Haven	2
3	Rochester	4

Calder Cup Final
1	Nova Scotia	4
3	Rochester	2

== Trophy and award winners ==
Team awards

Calder Cup; Playoff champions:	Nova Scotia Voyageurs
F. G. "Teddy" Oke Trophy; Regular Season champions:	Nova Scotia Voyageurs

Individual awards

Les Cunningham Award; Most valuable player:	Doug Gibson - Rochester Americans
John B. Sollenberger Trophy; Top point scorer:	Andre Peloffy - Springfield Indians
Dudley "Red" Garrett Memorial Award; Rookie of the year:	Rod Schutt - Nova Scotia Voyageurs
Eddie Shore Award; Defenceman of the year:	Brian Engblom - Nova Scotia Voyageurs
Harry "Hap" Holmes Memorial Award; Lowest goals against average:	Ed Walsh & Dave Elenbaas - Nova Scotia Voyageurs
Louis A.R. Pieri Memorial Award; Coach of the year:	Al MacNeil - Nova Scotia Voyageurs

Other awards

James C. Hendy Memorial Award; Most outstanding executive:	Frank Mathers
James H. Ellery Memorial Awards; Outstanding media coverage:	Steve Summers & Bruce Whitman, Hershey, (newspaper); Leo MacIsaac, Nova Scotia, (radio); Rich Funke, Rochester, (television)

== See also ==
- List of AHL seasons

Preceded by 1975–76 AHL season	AHL seasons	Succeeded by 1977–78 AHL season
