= 1968–69 AHL season =

- League: American Hockey League
- Sport: Ice hockey

Regular season
- F. G. "Teddy" Oke Trophy: Hershey Bears
- Season MVP: Gilles Villemure
- Top scorer: Jeannot Gilbert

Playoffs
- Champions: Hershey Bears
- Runners-up: Quebec Aces

AHL seasons
- 1967–68 1969–70

The 1968–69 AHL season was the 33rd season of the American Hockey League. Eight teams played 74 games each in the schedule. The Buffalo Bisons finished first overall in the regular season, and the Hershey Bears won their fourth Calder Cup championship.

== Final standings ==
Note: GP = Games played; W = Wins; L = Losses; T = Ties; GF = Goals for; GA = Goals against; Pts = Points;

East	GP	W	L	T	Pts	GF	GA
Hershey Bears (BOS)	74	41	27	6	88	307	234
Baltimore Clippers (DET/PHI/PIT)	74	33	34	7	73	266	257
Providence Reds (STL)	74	32	36	6	70	242	284
Springfield Kings (LAK)	74	27	36	11	65	257	274

West	GP	W	L	T	Pts	GF	GA
Buffalo Bisons (NYR)	74	41	18	15	97	282	192
Cleveland Barons (MTL/OAK)	74	30	32	12	72	213	245
Quebec Aces (PHI)	74	26	34	14	66	235	258
Rochester Americans (TOR)	74	25	38	11	61	237	295

== Scoring leaders ==
Note: GP = Games played; G = Goals; A = Assists; Pts = Points; PIM = Penalty minutes

Player	Team	GP	G	A	Pts	PIM
Jeannot Gilbert	Hershey Bears	71	35	65	100	13
Michel Harvey	Hershey Bears	74	41	52	93	29
Guy Trottier	Buffalo Bisons	72	45	37	82	21
Ron Ward	Rochester Americans	73	35	43	78	18
Willie Marshall	Baltimore Clippers	74	26	52	78	18
Jean-Marie Cossette	Baltimore Clippers	64	27	48	75	48
Chuck Hamilton	Hershey Bears	74	28	46	74	46
Don McKenney	Providence Reds	74	26	48	74	12
Rene Drolet	Quebec Aces	61	30	42	72	14
Norm Beaudin	Buffalo Bisons	74	32	39	71	10

- complete list

== Calder Cup playoffs ==
First round

- Hershey Bears defeated Buffalo Bisons 4 games to 2.
- Providence Reds defeated Baltimore Clippers 3 games to 1.
- Quebec Aces defeated Cleveland Barons 3 games to 2.

Second round

- Hershey Bears earned second round bye.
- Quebec Aces defeated Providence Reds 3 games to 2.

Finals

- Hershey Bears defeated Quebec Aces 4 games to 1, to win the Calder Cup.
- list of scores

== Trophy and award winners ==
Team awards

Calder Cup; Playoff champions:	Hershey Bears
F. G. "Teddy" Oke Trophy; Regular Season champions, East Division:	Hershey Bears
John D. Chick Trophy; Regular Season champions, West Division:	Buffalo Bisons

Individual awards

Les Cunningham Award; Most valuable player:	Gilles Villemure - Buffalo Bisons
John B. Sollenberger Trophy; Top point scorer:	Jeannot Gilbert - Hershey Bears
Dudley "Red" Garrett Memorial Award; Rookie of the year:	Ron Ward - Rochester Americans
Eddie Shore Award; Defenceman of the year:	Bob Blackburn - Buffalo Bisons
Harry "Hap" Holmes Memorial Award; Lowest goals against average:	Gilles Villemure - Buffalo Bisons
Louis A. R. Pieri Memorial Award; Coach of the year:	Frank Mathers - Hershey Bears

Other awards

James C. Hendy Memorial Award; Most outstanding executive:	Lloyd S. Blinco
James H. Ellery Memorial Award; Outstanding media coverage:	John Travers, Hershey

== See also ==
- List of AHL seasons

Preceded by 1967–68 AHL season	AHL seasons	Succeeded by 1969–70 AHL season
