= 1964–65 AHL season =

- League: American Hockey League
- Sport: Ice hockey

Regular season
- F. G. "Teddy" Oke Trophy: Quebec Aces
- Season MVP: Art Stratton
- Top scorer: Art Stratton

Playoffs
- Champions: Rochester Americans
- Runners-up: Hershey Bears

AHL seasons
- 1963–64 1965–66

The 1964–65 AHL season was the 29th season of the American Hockey League. The league inaugurates the James H. Ellery Memorial Award for outstanding media coverage of the AHL.

Nine teams played 72 games each in the schedule. The Rochester Americans finished first overall in the regular season, and won their first Calder Cup championship.

== Final standings ==
Note: GP = Games played; W = Wins; L = Losses; T = Ties; GF = Goals for; GA = Goals against; Pts = Points;

| East | GP | W | L | T | Pts | GF | GA |
|---|---|---|---|---|---|---|---|
| Quebec Aces (MTL) | 72 | 44 | 26 | 2 | 90 | 280 | 223 |
| Hershey Bears (BOS) | 72 | 36 | 32 | 4 | 76 | 246 | 243 |
| Baltimore Clippers (NYR) | 72 | 35 | 32 | 5 | 75 | 275 | 249 |
| Springfield Indians (independent) | 72 | 29 | 39 | 4 | 62 | 237 | 273 |
| Providence Reds (independent) | 72 | 20 | 50 | 2 | 42 | 193 | 312 |

| West | GP | W | L | T | Pts | GF | GA |
|---|---|---|---|---|---|---|---|
| Rochester Americans (TOR) | 72 | 48 | 21 | 3 | 99 | 310 | 199 |
| Buffalo Bisons (CHI) | 72 | 40 | 26 | 6 | 86 | 261 | 218 |
| Pittsburgh Hornets (DET) | 72 | 29 | 36 | 7 | 65 | 228 | 256 |
| Cleveland Barons (independent) | 72 | 24 | 43 | 5 | 53 | 228 | 285 |

== Scoring leaders ==
Note: GP = Games played; G = Goals; A = Assists; Pts = Points; PIM = Penalty minutes

| Player | Team | GP | G | A | Pts | PIM |
|---|---|---|---|---|---|---|
| Art Stratton | Buffalo Bisons | 71 | 25 | 84 | 109 | 32 |
| Bronco Horvath | Rochester Americans | 72 | 38 | 68 | 106 | 24 |
| Len Lunde | Buffalo Bisons | 72 | 50 | 46 | 96 | 40 |
| Pat Hannigan | Buffalo Bisons | 72 | 38 | 54 | 92 | 116 |
| Stan Smrke | Rochester Americans | 71 | 33 | 59 | 92 | 28 |
| Gerry Ehman | Rochester Americans | 70 | 38 | 49 | 87 | 20 |
| Ed Litzenberger | Rochester Americans | 72 | 25 | 61 | 86 | 34 |
| Wayne Hicks | Quebec Aces | 72 | 38 | 47 | 85 | 52 |
| Gord Labossiere | Baltimore Clippers | 72 | 38 | 41 | 79 | 72 |
| Ed Hoekstra | Quebec Aces | 71 | 28 | 51 | 79 | 16 |

- complete list

== Calder Cup playoffs ==
First round

- Rochester Americans defeated Quebec Aces 4 games to 1.
- Hershey Bears defeated Baltimore Clippers 3 games to 2.
- Buffalo Bisons defeated Pittsburgh Hornets 3 games to 1.

Second round

- Rochester Americans earned second round bye.
- Hershey Bears defeated Buffalo Bisons 3 games to 2.

Finals

- Rochester Americans defeated Hershey Bears 4 games to 1, to win the Calder Cup.
- list of scores

== Trophy and award winners ==
Team awards

| Calder Cup; Playoff champions: | Rochester Americans |
| F. G. "Teddy" Oke Trophy; Regular Season champions, East Division: | Quebec Aces |
| John D. Chick Trophy; Regular Season champions, West Division: | Rochester Americans |

Individual awards

| Les Cunningham Award; Most valuable player: | Art Stratton - Buffalo Bisons |
| John B. Sollenberger Trophy; Top point scorer: | Art Stratton - Buffalo Bisons |
| Dudley "Red" Garrett Memorial Award; Rookie of the year: | Ray Cullen - Buffalo Bisons |
| Eddie Shore Award; Defenceman of the year: | Al Arbour - Rochester Americans |
| Harry "Hap" Holmes Memorial Award; Lowest goals against average: | Gerry Cheevers - Rochester Americans |

Other awards

| James C. Hendy Memorial Award; Most outstanding executive: | Robert Martineau (posthumously) |
| James H. Ellery Memorial Award; Outstanding media coverage: | Charley Barton, Buffalo |

== See also ==
- List of AHL seasons

| Preceded by 1963–64 AHL season | AHL seasons | Succeeded by 1965–66 AHL season |
