= 1969–70 AHL season =

- League: American Hockey League
- Sport: Ice hockey

Regular season
- F. G. "Teddy" Oke Trophy: Montreal Voyageurs
- Season MVP: Gilles Villemure
- Top scorer: Jude Drouin

Playoffs
- Champions: Buffalo Bisons
- Runners-up: Springfield Kings

AHL seasons
- 1968–69 1970–71

The 1969–70 AHL season was the 34th season of the American Hockey League. Nine teams played 72 games each in the schedule. The Montreal Voyageurs became the second Canada-based team in the league, and finished first overall in the regular season. This would be the last season for the Buffalo Bisons in the AHL as the National Hockey League added the Buffalo Sabres who would begin play the next season, the Bisons would go out on top by winning their fifth Calder Cup championship.

== Team changes ==
- The Montreal Voyageurs join the AHL as an expansion team, based in Montreal, Quebec, playing in the East Division.
- The Quebec Aces switch divisions from West to East.
- The Baltimore Clippers and the Hershey Bears switch divisions from East to West.

== Final standings ==
Note: GP = Games played; W = Wins; L = Losses; T = Ties; GF = Goals for; GA = Goals against; Pts = Points;

East	GP	W	L	T	Pts	GF	GA
Montreal Voyageurs (MTL)	72	43	15	14	100	327	195
Springfield Kings (LAK)	72	38	29	5	81	287	287
Quebec Aces (PHI)	72	27	39	6	60	221	272
Providence Reds (OAK)	72	23	36	13	59	218	267

West	GP	W	L	T	Pts	GF	GA
Buffalo Bisons (NYR/STL/TOR)	72	40	17	15	95	280	193
Hershey Bears (BOS)	72	28	28	16	72	247	249
Baltimore Clippers (PIT)	72	25	30	17	67	230	252
Cleveland Barons (DET)	72	23	33	16	62	222	255
Rochester Americans (independent)	72	18	38	16	52	253	315

== Scoring leaders ==
Note: GP = Games played; G = Goals; A = Assists; Pts = Points; PIM = Penalty minutes

Player	Team	GP	G	A	Pts	PIM
Jude Drouin	Montreal Voyageurs	65	37	69	106	88
Gord Labossiere	Springfield Kings	60	30	59	89	94
Guy Trottier	Buffalo Bisons	71	55	33	88	8
Doug Robinson	Springfield Kings	70	45	41	86	26
Marc Dufour	Springfield Kings	71	32	53	85	22
Guy Charron	Montreal Voyageurs	65	37	45	82	20
Norm Beaudin	Cleveland Barons	70	37	44	81	10
Rene Drolet	Quebec Aces	71	32	48	80	42
Bill Inglis	Springfield Kings	72	31	44	75	25
Norm Armstrong	Rochester Americans	70	30	45	75	117

- complete list

== Calder Cup playoffs ==
First round

- Montreal Voyageurs defeated Baltimore Clippers 4 games to 1.
- Buffalo Bisons defeated Quebec Aces 4 games to 2.
- Springfield Kings defeated Hershey Bears 4 games to 3.

Second round

- In double round-robin, Buffalo Bisons and Springfield Kings advanced. Montreal Voyageurs eliminated after third loss.

Finals

- Buffalo Bisons defeated Springfield Kings 4 games to 0, to win the Calder Cup.
- list of scores

== Trophy and award winners ==
Team awards

Calder Cup; Playoff champions:	Buffalo Bisons
F. G. "Teddy" Oke Trophy; Regular Season champions, East Division:	Montreal Voyageurs
John D. Chick Trophy; Regular Season champions, West Division:	Buffalo Bisons

Individual awards

Les Cunningham Award; Most valuable player:	Gilles Villemure - Buffalo Bisons
John B. Sollenberger Trophy; Top point scorer:	Jude Drouin - Montreal Voyageurs
Dudley "Red" Garrett Memorial Award; Rookie of the year:	Jude Drouin - Montreal Voyageurs
Eddie Shore Award; Defenceman of the year:	Noel Price - Springfield Kings
Harry "Hap" Holmes Memorial Award; Lowest goals against average:	Gilles Villemure - Buffalo Bisons
Louis A. R. Pieri Memorial Award; Coach of the year:	Fred Shero - Buffalo Bisons

Other awards

James C. Hendy Memorial Award; Most outstanding executive:	Eddie Shore
James H. Ellery Memorial Award; Outstanding media coverage:	Les Sterns, Springfield

== See also ==
- List of AHL seasons

Preceded by 1968–69 AHL season	AHL seasons	Succeeded by 1970–71 AHL season
