= 1949–50 AHL season =

- League: American Hockey League
- Sport: Ice hockey

Regular season
- F. G. "Teddy" Oke Trophy: Cleveland Barons
- Season MVP: Les Douglas
- Top scorer: Les Douglas

Playoffs
- Champions: Indianapolis Capitals
- Runners-up: Cleveland Barons

AHL seasons
- 1948–49 1950–51

The 1949–50 AHL season was the 14th season of the American Hockey League. Ten teams played 70 games each in the schedule. The Cleveland Barons won their seventh F. G. "Teddy" Oke Trophy as West Division champions. The Indianapolis Capitals and won their second Calder Cup as league champions.

== Team changes ==
- The Philadelphia Rockets cease operations.
- The Washington Lions move to Cincinnati, Ohio becoming the Cincinnati Mohawks.
- The Cincinnati Mohawks then switch divisions with the Buffalo Bisons.

== Final standings ==
Note: GP = Games played; W = Wins; L = Losses; T = Ties; GF = Goals for; GA = Goals against; Pts = Points;

East	GP	W	L	T	Pts	GF	GA
Buffalo Bisons (MTL)	70	32	29	9	73	226	208
Providence Reds (independent)	70	34	33	3	71	268	267
Springfield Indians (independent)	70	28	34	8	64	245	258
New Haven Ramblers (NYR)	70	24	36	10	58	196	250
Hershey Bears (BOS)	70	21	39	10	52	229	310

West	GP	W	L	T	Pts	GF	GA
Cleveland Barons (independent)	70	45	15	10	100	357	230
Indianapolis Capitals (DET)	70	35	24	11	81	267	231
St. Louis Flyers (independent)	70	34	28	8	76	258	250
Pittsburgh Hornets (TOR)	70	29	26	15	73	215	185
Cincinnati Mohawks (MTL)	70	19	37	14	52	185	257

== Scoring leaders ==
Note: GP = Games played; G = Goals; A = Assists; Pts = Points; PIM = Penalty minutes

Player	Team	GP	G	A	Pts	PIM
Les Douglas	Cleveland Barons	67	32	68	100	27
Ab DeMarco	Buffalo Bisons	70	40	54	94	16
John Chad	Providence Reds	70	36	54	90	4
Pete Leswick	Cleveland Barons	64	36	50	86	18
Jack Gordon	New Haven Ramblers	70	23	60	83	2
Cliff Simpson	St. Louis Flyers	56	31	52	83	8
Fred Thurier	Cleveland Barons	57	30	52	82	22
Bob Carse	Cleveland Barons	69	30	52	82	23
Jack McGill	Providence Reds	66	24	58	82	67
Bill McComb	St. Louis Flyers	61	32	49	81	43

- complete list

== Calder Cup playoffs ==
First round

- Cleveland Barons defeated Buffalo Bisons 4 games to 1.
- Providence Reds defeated Springfield Indians 2 games to 0.
- Indianapolis Capitals defeated St. Louis Flyers 2 games to 0.

Second round

- Cleveland Barons earned second round bye.
- Indianapolis Capitals defeated Providence Reds 2 games to 0.

Finals

- Indianapolis Capitals defeated Cleveland Barons 4 games to 0, to win the Calder Cup.
- list of scores

== Trophy and Award winners ==
Team Awards

Calder Cup; Playoff champions:	Indianapolis Capitals
F. G. "Teddy" Oke Trophy; Regular Season champions, West Division:	Cleveland Barons

Individual Awards

Les Cunningham Award; Most valuable player:	Les Douglas - Cleveland Barons
Carl Liscombe Trophy; Top point scorer:	Les Douglas - Cleveland Barons
Dudley "Red" Garrett Memorial Award; Rookie of the year:	Paul Meger - Buffalo Bisons
Harry "Hap" Holmes Memorial Award; Lowest goals against average:	Connie Dion - Buffalo Bisons

== See also ==
- List of AHL seasons

Preceded by 1948–49 AHL season	AHL seasons	Succeeded by 1950–51 AHL season
