= 1963–64 AHL season =

- League: American Hockey League
- Sport: Ice hockey

Regular season
- F. G. "Teddy" Oke Trophy: Quebec Aces
- Season MVP: Fred Glover
- Top scorer: Gerry Ehman

Playoffs
- Champions: Cleveland Barons
- Runners-up: Quebec Aces

AHL seasons
- 1962–63 1964–65

The 1963–64 AHL season was the 28th season of the American Hockey League. Nine teams played 72 games each in the schedule. The Quebec Aces finished first overall in the regular season. The Cleveland Barons won their ninth Calder Cup championship.

== Final standings ==
Note: GP = Games played; W = Wins; L = Losses; T = Ties; GF = Goals for; GA = Goals against; Pts = Points;

East	GP	W	L	T	Pts	GF	GA
Quebec Aces (MTL)	72	41	30	1	83	258	225
Hershey Bears (independent)	72	36	31	5	77	236	249
Providence Reds (BOS)	72	32	35	5	69	248	239
Baltimore Clippers (NYR)	72	32	37	3	67	200	220
Springfield Indians (independent)	72	23	44	5	51	238	292

West	GP	W	L	T	Pts	GF	GA
Pittsburgh Hornets (DET)	72	40	29	3	83	242	196
Rochester Americans (TOR)	72	40	30	2	82	256	223
Cleveland Barons (MTL)	72	37	30	5	79	239	207
Buffalo Bisons (CHI)	72	25	40	7	57	194	260

== Scoring leaders ==
Note: GP = Games played; G = Goals; A = Assists; Pts = Points; PIM = Penalty minutes

Player	Team	GP	G	A	Pts	PIM
Gerry Ehman	Rochester Americans	66	36	49	85	26
Bronco Horvath	Rochester Americans	70	25	59	84	28
Brian Kilrea	Springfield Indians	72	22	61	83	28
Willie Marshall	Providence Reds	72	33	50	83	18
Cleland Mortson	Quebec Aces	71	28	55	83	122
Art Stratton	Pittsburgh Hornets	66	17	65	82	29
Wayne Hicks	Quebec Aces	70	36	42	78	30
Fred Glover	Cleveland Barons	69	26	50	76	155
Bill Sweeney	Springfield Indians	72	25	48	73	18
Len Lunde	Buffalo Bisons	72	30	43	73	38

- complete list

== Calder Cup playoffs ==
First round

- Quebec Aces defeated Pittsburgh Hornets 4 games to 1.
- Hershey Bears defeated Providence Reds 2 games to 1.
- Cleveland Barons defeated Rochester Americans 2 games to 0.

Second round

- Quebec Aces earned second round bye.
- Cleveland Barons defeated Hershey Bears 3 games to 0.

Finals

- Cleveland Barons defeated Quebec Aces 4 games to 0, to win the Calder Cup.
- list of scores

== Trophy and award winners ==
Team awards

Calder Cup; Playoff champions:	Cleveland Barons
F. G. "Teddy" Oke Trophy; Regular Season champions, East Division:	Quebec Aces
John D. Chick Trophy; Regular Season champions, West Division:	Pittsburgh Hornets

Individual awards

Les Cunningham Award; Most valuable player:	Fred Glover - Cleveland Barons
John B. Sollenberger Trophy; Top point scorer:	Gerry Ehman - Rochester Americans
Dudley "Red" Garrett Memorial Award; Rookie of the year:	Roger Crozier - Pittsburgh Hornets
Eddie Shore Award; Defenceman of the year:	Ted Harris - Cleveland Barons
Harry "Hap" Holmes Memorial Award; Lowest goals against average:	Roger Crozier - Pittsburgh Hornets

Other awards

James C. Hendy Memorial Award; Most outstanding executive:	James H. Ellery (posthumously)

== See also ==
- List of AHL seasons

Preceded by 1962–63 AHL season	AHL seasons	Succeeded by 1964–65 AHL season
