= 1962–63 AHL season =

- League: American Hockey League
- Sport: Ice hockey

Regular season
- F. G. "Teddy" Oke Trophy: Providence Reds
- Season MVP: Denis DeJordy
- Top scorer: Bill Sweeney

Playoffs
- Champions: Buffalo Bisons
- Runners-up: Hershey Bears

AHL seasons
- 1961–62 1963–64

The 1962–63 AHL season was the 27th season of the American Hockey League. Nine teams played 72 games each in the schedule. The Buffalo Bisons finished first overall in the regular season, and won their fourth Calder Cup championship.

== Team changes ==
- The Baltimore Clippers join the AHL as an expansion team, based in Baltimore, Maryland, playing in the East Division.

== Final standings ==
Note: GP = Games played; W = Wins; L = Losses; T = Ties; GF = Goals for; GA = Goals against; Pts = Points;

East	GP	W	L	T	Pts	GF	GA
Providence Reds (independent)	72	38	29	5	81	239	203
Hershey Bears (independent)	72	36	28	8	80	262	231
Baltimore Clippers (NYR)	72	35	30	7	77	226	244
Quebec Aces (MTL)	72	33	28	11	77	206	210
Springfield Indians (independent)	72	33	31	8	74	282	236

West	GP	W	L	T	Pts	GF	GA
Buffalo Bisons (CHI)	72	41	24	7	89	237	199
Cleveland Barons (independent)	72	31	34	7	69	270	253
Rochester Americans (TOR)	72	24	39	9	57	241	270
Pittsburgh Hornets (DET)	72	20	48	4	44	200	317

== Scoring leaders ==
Note: GP = Games played; G = Goals; A = Assists; Pts = Points; PIM = Penalty minutes

Player	Team	GP	G	A	Pts	PIM
Bill Sweeney	Springfield Indians	69	38	65	103	16
Hank Ciesla	Cleveland Barons	72	42	56	98	41
Willie Marshall	Hershey Bears	72	36	56	92	12
Art Stratton	Buffalo Bisons	70	20	70	90	18
Bruce Cline	Springfield Indians	72	39	48	87	26
Cleland Mortson	Hershey Bears	72	32	54	86	97
Bill Masterton	Cleveland Barons	72	27	55	82	12
John McKenzie	Buffalo Bisons	71	35	46	81	122
Stan Baluik	Providence Reds	72	23	58	81	52
Fred Glover	Cleveland Barons	71	26	54	80	171

- complete list

== Calder Cup playoffs ==
First round

- Buffalo Bisons defeated Providence Reds 4 games to 2.
- Hershey Bears defeated Baltimore Clippers 2 games to 1.
- Cleveland Barons defeated Rochester Americans 2 games to 0.

Second round

- Buffalo Bisons earned second round bye.
- Hershey Bears defeated Cleveland Barons 3 games to 2.

Finals

- Buffalo Bisons defeated Hershey Bears 4 games to 3, to win the Calder Cup.
- list of scores

== Trophy and award winners ==
Team awards

Calder Cup; Playoff champions:	Buffalo Bisons
F. G. "Teddy" Oke Trophy; Regular Season champions, East Division:	Providence Reds
John D. Chick Trophy; Regular Season champions, West Division:	Buffalo Bisons

Individual awards

Les Cunningham Award; Most valuable player:	Denis DeJordy - Buffalo Bisons
John B. Sollenberger Trophy; Top point scorer:	Bill Sweeney - Springfield Indians
Dudley "Red" Garrett Memorial Award; Rookie of the year:	Doug Robinson - Buffalo Bisons
Eddie Shore Award; Defenceman of the year:	Marc Reaume - Hershey Bears
Harry "Hap" Holmes Memorial Award; Lowest goals against average:	Denis DeJordy - Buffalo Bisons

Other awards

James C. Hendy Memorial Award; Most outstanding executive:	C. Stafford Smythe

== See also ==
- List of AHL seasons

Preceded by 1961–62 AHL season	AHL seasons	Succeeded by 1963–64 AHL season
