= 1950–51 AHL season =

- League: American Hockey League
- Sport: Ice hockey

Regular season
- F. G. "Teddy" Oke Trophy: Cleveland Barons
- Season MVP: Ab DeMarco
- Top scorer: Ab DeMarco

Playoffs
- Champions: Cleveland Barons
- Runners-up: Pittsburgh Hornets

AHL seasons
- 1949–50 1951–52

The 1950–51 AHL season was the 15th season of the American Hockey League. Ten teams were scheduled to play 70 games each, however the New Haven Eagles folded midseason. The Cleveland Barons won their eighth F. G. "Teddy" Oke Trophy as West Division champions, and their fifth Calder Cup as league champions.

== Team changes ==
- The New Haven Ramblers reverted to their previous name, the New Haven Eagles.
- The New Haven Eagles ceased operations 28 games into the season.

== Final standings ==
Note: GP = Games played; W = Wins; L = Losses; T = Ties; GF = Goals for; GA = Goals against; Pts = Points;

| East | GP | W | L | T | Pts | GF | GA |
|---|---|---|---|---|---|---|---|
| Buffalo Bisons (MTL) | 70 | 40 | 26 | 4 | 84 | 309 | 284 |
| Hershey Bears (BOS) | 70 | 38 | 28 | 4 | 80 | 256 | 242 |
| Springfield Indians (independent) | 70 | 27 | 37 | 6 | 60 | 268 | 254 |
| Providence Reds (independent) | 70 | 24 | 41 | 5 | 53 | 247 | 303 |
| New Haven Eagles^{†} (independent) | 28 | 5 | 23 | 0 | 10 | 74 | 154 |

| West | GP | W | L | T | Pts | GF | GA |
|---|---|---|---|---|---|---|---|
| Cleveland Barons (independent) | 71 | 44 | 22 | 5 | 93 | 281 | 221 |
| Indianapolis Capitals (DET) | 70 | 38 | 29 | 3 | 79 | 287 | 255 |
| Pittsburgh Hornets (TOR) | 71 | 31 | 33 | 7 | 69 | 212 | 177 |
| St. Louis Flyers (independent) | 70 | 32 | 34 | 4 | 68 | 233 | 252 |
| Cincinnati Mohawks (MTL/NYR) | 70 | 28 | 34 | 8 | 64 | 203 | 228 |

^{†}New Haven Eagles folded midseason.

== Scoring leaders ==
Note: GP = Games played; G = Goals; A = Assists; Pts = Points; PIM = Penalty minutes

| Player | Team | GP | G | A | Pts | PIM |
|---|---|---|---|---|---|---|
| Ab DeMarco | Buffalo Bisons | 64 | 37 | 76 | 113 | 35 |
| Grant Warwick | Buffalo Bisons | 65 | 34 | 65 | 99 | 43 |
| Jack McGill | Providence Reds | 69 | 29 | 69 | 98 | 58 |
| Fred Thurier | Cleveland Barons | 64 | 32 | 63 | 95 | 19 |
| George Sullivan | Hershey Bears | 70 | 28 | 56 | 84 | 36 |
| Max McNab | Indianapolis Capitals | 70 | 36 | 48 | 84 | 8 |
| Fred Glover | Indianapolis Capitals | 69 | 48 | 36 | 84 | 106 |
| Wally Hergesheimer | Cleveland Barons | 71 | 42 | 41 | 83 | 8 |

- complete list

== Calder Cup playoffs ==
First round

- Cleveland Barons defeated Buffalo Bisons 4 games to 0.
- Hershey Bears defeated Indianapolis Capitals 3 games to 0.
- Pittsburgh Hornets defeated Springfield Indians 3 games to 0.

Second round

- Cleveland Barons earned second round bye.
- Pittsburgh Hornets defeated Hershey Bears 3 games to 0.

Finals

- Cleveland Barons defeated Pittsburgh Hornets 4 games to 3, to win the Calder Cup.
- list of scores

== Trophy and award winners ==
Team Awards

| Calder Cup; Playoff champions: | Cleveland Barons |
| F. G. "Teddy" Oke Trophy; Regular Season champions, West Division: | Cleveland Barons |

Individual Awards

| Les Cunningham Award; Most valuable player: | Ab DeMarco - Buffalo Bisons |
| Carl Liscombe Trophy; Top point scorer: | Ab DeMarco - Buffalo Bisons |
| Dudley "Red" Garrett Memorial Award; Rookie of the year: | Wally Hergesheimer - Cleveland Barons |
| Harry "Hap" Holmes Memorial Award; Lowest goals against average: | Gil Mayer - Pittsburgh Hornets |

== See also ==
- List of AHL seasons

| Preceded by 1949–50 AHL season | AHL seasons | Succeeded by 1951–52 AHL season |
