= 1944–45 AHL season =

- League: American Hockey League
- Sport: Ice hockey

Regular season
- F. G. "Teddy" Oke Trophy: Cleveland Barons

Playoffs
- Champions: Cleveland Barons
- Runners-up: Hershey Bears

AHL seasons
- 1943–44 1945–46

The 1944–45 AHL season was the ninth season of the American Hockey League. Seven teams played 60 games each in the schedule. The Cleveland Barons won their third F. G. "Teddy" Oke Trophy as West Division champions, and their third Calder Cup as league champions.

== Team changes ==
- The St. Louis Flyers transfer to the AHL from the defunct American Hockey Association, as an expansion team based in St. Louis, Missouri, playing in the West Division.

== Final standings ==
Note: GP = Games played; W = Wins; L = Losses; T = Ties; GF = Goals for; GA = Goals against; Pts = Points;

East	GP	W	L	T	Pts	GF	GA
Buffalo Bisons (independent)	60	31	21	8	70	200	182
Hershey Bears (independent)	60	28	24	8	64	197	186
Providence Reds (independent)	60	23	31	6	52	241	249

West	GP	W	L	T	Pts	GF	GA
Cleveland Barons (independent)	60	34	16	10	78	256	199
Indianapolis Capitals (DET)	60	25	24	11	61	169	167
Pittsburgh Hornets (independent)	60	26	27	7	59	267	247
St. Louis Flyers (independent)	60	14	38	8	36	157	257

== Scoring leaders ==
Note: GP = Games played; G = Goals; A = Assists; Pts = Points; PIM = Penalty minutes

Player	Team	GP	G	A	Pts	PIM
Bob Walton	Pittsburgh Hornets	58	37	58	95	17
Bob Gracie	Pittsburgh Hornets	58	40	55	95	4
Louis Trudel	Cleveland Barons	60	45	48	93	25
Tom Burlington	Cleveland Barons	56	30	60	90	7
Earl Bartholomew	Cleveland Barons	60	38	43	81	26
Les Cunningham	Cleveland Barons	56	35	45	80	4
Paul Courteau	Providence Reds	45	32	40	72	45
Jack Lavoie	Providence Reds	60	28	41	69	6
Billy Gooden	Hershey Bears	59	27	41	68	12
Pete Leswick	Indianapolis Capitals	53	29	39	68	12

- complete list

== Calder Cup playoffs ==
League Semi-Finals
E1	Buffalo	2
W1	Cleveland	4
E2	Hershey	4
W2	Indianapolis	1

Calder Cup Final
W1	Cleveland	4
E2	Hershey	2

== See also ==
- List of AHL seasons

Preceded by 1943–44 AHL season	AHL seasons	Succeeded by 1945–46 AHL season
