= New Haven Eagles =

Ice hockey team from Connecticut, US

- City: New Haven, Connecticut
- League: American Hockey League
- Operated: 1926–1951
- Home arena: New Haven Arena
- Owner: Abraham Podoloff

Franchise history
- 1926–1943, 1945–1946: New Haven Eagles
- 1946–1950: New Haven Ramblers
- 1950–1951: New Haven Eagles

Championships
- Regular season titles: 1: 1926–27

The New Haven Eagles were a professional ice hockey team that played in New Haven, Connecticut. The Eagles were one of five inaugural franchises in the Canadian American Hockey League, and a founding member of the American Hockey League.

== History ==
The Eagles finished in first place during their inaugural season, with a record of 18–14–0, and also won the league championship in the playoffs. New Haven played in the Can-Am league from 1926 to 1936, when the league became part of the International-American Hockey League. The Eagles played in the new I-AHL from 1936 to 1940, when the league was renamed the American Hockey League. New Haven continued in the AHL until 1943. The team suspended operations for two seasons during World War II. The Eagles were resurrected for the 1945–46 season.

From 1946 to 1950 the franchise was known as the New Haven Ramblers. The team was reverted to the Eagles name for the 1950–51 season. However, the team folded in the middle of the season after only 28 games with a record of 5–23–0.

=== Other New Haven teams ===
Several other teams called New Haven their home. Three teams from the Eastern Hockey League include the New Haven Tomahawks (1951–52), New Haven Nutmegs (1952–53), and the New Haven Blades (1954–1972). Two subsequent franchises playing the AHL were based in New Haven; the New Haven Nighthawks (1972–1992), who were renamed the New Haven Senators (1992–93), Beast of New Haven (1997–1999), and most recently the UHL's New Haven Knights (2000–2002).

== Season-by-season results ==
- New Haven Eagles 1926–1936 (Canadian-American Hockey League)
- New Haven Eagles 1936–1940 (International-American Hockey League)
- New Haven Eagles 1940–1943
- New Haven Eagles 1945–1946
- New Haven Ramblers 1946–1950
- New Haven Eagles 1950–1951

=== Regular season ===
Season	Games	Won	Lost	Tied	Points	Goals for	Goals against	Standing
1926–27	32	18	14	0	36	73	66	1st, CAHL
1927–28	40	16	20	4	36	81	90	4th, CAHL
1928–29	40	15	15	10	40	73	68	3rd, CAHL
1929–30	39	14	19	6	34	94	101	4th, CAHL
1930–31	40	9	23	8	26	78	140	5th, CAHL
1931–32	40	19	15	6	44	113	75	3rd, CAHL
1932–33	48	16	27	5	37	100	137	4th, CAHL
1933–34	40	12	24	4	28	72	107	5th, CAHL
1934–35	48	16	23	9	41	125	145	4th, CAHL
1935–36	48	19	25	4	42	122	149	5th, CAHL
1936–37	48	14	28	6	34	107	142	4th, East
1937–38	48	13	28	7	33	93	131	3rd, East
1938–39	54	14	30	10	38	114	174	4th, East
1939–40	54	27	24	3	57	177	183	2nd, East
1940–41	56	27	21	8	62	179	153	2nd, East
1941–42	56	26	26	4	56	182	219	2nd, East
1942–43	32	9	18	5	23	85	116	4th, East
1945–46	62	14	38	10	38	199	263	4th, East
1946–47	64	23	31	10	56	199	218	3rd, East
1947–48	68	31	30	7	69	254	242	2nd, East
1948–49	68	20	40	8	48	223	286	4th, East
1949–50	70	24	36	10	58	196	250	4th, East
1950–51	28	5	23	0	10	74	154	5th, East

=== Playoffs ===
Season	1st round	2nd round	Finals
1926–27	—	—	L, 5–9, Springfield
1927–1940	Data unavailable		
1940–41	L, 0–2, Hershey	—	—
1941–42	L, 0–2, Hershey	—	—
1942–43	Incomplete season		
1945–46	Out of playoffs		
1946–47	L, 1–2, Pittsburgh	—	—
1947–48	W, 2–0, Pittsburgh	L, 0–2, Buffalo	—
1948–49	Out of playoffs		
1949–50	Out of playoffs		
1950–51	Incomplete season		

=== American Hockey League Hall of Famers ===
AHL Hall of Fame Honored Members
Name	Seasons	Induction Year
Dunc Fisher	1947-48 (player)	2025
Jack Gordon	1947-50 (player)	2012
Maurice Podoloff	1926-51 (owner)	2011

== See also ==
- Professional Hockey In Connecticut
