= 1951–52 AHL season =

- League: American Hockey League
- Sport: Ice hockey

Regular season
- F. G. "Teddy" Oke Trophy: Pittsburgh Hornets
- Season MVP: Ray Powell
- Top scorer: Ray Powell

Playoffs
- Champions: Pittsburgh Hornets
- Runners-up: Providence Reds

AHL seasons
- 1950–51 1952–53

The 1951–52 AHL season was the 16th season of the American Hockey League. Nine teams played 68 games each in the schedule. The Pittsburgh Hornets won their first F. G. "Teddy" Oke Trophy as West Division champions, and their first Calder Cup as league champions.

== Team changes ==
- The Springfield Indians move to Syracuse, New York, becoming the Syracuse Warriors.

== Final standings ==
Note: GP = Games played; W = Wins; L = Losses; T = Ties; GF = Goals for; GA = Goals against; Pts = Points;

East	GP	W	L	T	Pts	GF	GA
Hershey Bears (BOS)	68	35	28	5	75	256	215
Providence Reds (independent)	68	32	33	3	67	263	270
Buffalo Bisons (MTL)	68	28	36	4	60	230	298
Syracuse Warriors (independent)	68	25	42	1	51	211	272

West	GP	W	L	T	Pts	GF	GA
Pittsburgh Hornets (TOR)	68	46	19	3	95	267	179
Cleveland Barons (independent)	68	44	19	5	93	265	166
Cincinnati Mohawks (NYR)	68	29	33	6	64	183	228
St. Louis Flyers (CHI)	68	28	39	1	57	256	262
Indianapolis Capitals (DET)	68	22	40	6	50	232	273

== Scoring leaders ==
Note: GP = Games played; G = Goals; A = Assists; Pts = Points; PIM = Penalty minutes

Player	Team	GP	G	A	Pts	PIM
Ray Powell	Providence Reds	67	35	62	97	6
Steve Wochy	Cleveland Barons	68	37	41	78	42
Jackie Hamilton	St. Louis Flyers	67	27	50	77	34
Ab DeMarco	Buffalo Bisons	67	28	49	77	34
Barry Sullivan	Providence Reds	61	25	47	72	12
Kelly Burnett	Syracuse Warriors	68	25	43	68	10
Earl Reibel	Indianapolis Capitals	68	33	34	67	8
Grant Warwick	Buffalo Bisons	55	24	41	65	35
Paul Gladu	Providence Reds	66	31	33	64	64
Bob Hassard	Pittsburgh Hornets	67	18	46	64	36

- complete list

== Calder Cup playoffs ==
Round 1
1	Pittsburgh Hornets	4
3	Hershey Bears	1
4	Providence Reds	3
2	Cleveland Barons	2
5	Cincinnati Mohawks	3
6	Buffalo Bisons	0

Round 2
1	Pittsburgh Hornets
Bye
4	Providence Reds	3
5	Cincinnati Mohawks	1

Calder Cup Final
1	Pittsburgh Hornets	4
4	Providence Reds	2

=== Round 1 ===
Pittsburgh Hornets 4, Hershey Bears 1

Game	Date	Visitor	Score	Home	Series	Arena	Attendance
1	March 18	Hershey Bears	1-2 OT	Pittsburgh Hornets	1–0	Duquesne Gardens	N/A
2	March 20	Hershey Bears	1-3	Pittsburgh Hornets	2-0	Duquesne Gardens	N/A
3	March 22	Pittsburgh Hornets	4-1	Hershey Bears	3-0	Hersheypark Arena	N/A
4	March 25	Pittsburgh Hornets	1-3	Hershey Bears	3–1	Hersheypark Arena	N/A
5	March 27	Hershey Bears	3-4 OT	Pittsburgh Hornets	4–1	Duquesne Gardens	N/A

Providence Reds 3, Cleveland Barons 2

Game	Date	Visitor	Score	Home	Series	Arena	Attendance
1	March 20	Providence Reds	2-3	Cleveland Barons	1–0	Cleveland Arena	N/A
2	March 22	Providence Reds	2-7	Cleveland Barons	2-0	Cleveland Arena	N/A
3	March 23	Cleveland Barons	1-5	Providence Reds	2-1	Rhode Island Auditorium	N/A
4	March 25	Cleveland Barons	0-4	Providence Reds	2-2	Rhode Island Auditorium	N/A
5	March 27	Providence Reds	4-2	Cleveland Barons	3-2	Cleveland Arena	N/A

Cincinnati Mohawks 3, Buffalo Bisons 0

Game	Date	Visitor	Score	Home	Series	Arena	Attendance
1	March 18	Buffalo Bisons	1-2 OT	Cincinnati Mohawks	1–0	Cincinnati Gardens	3,532
2	March 20	Buffalo Bison	1-2	Cincinnati Mohawks	2-0	Cincinnati Gardens	4,672
3	March 22	Cincinnati Mohawks	6-4 OT	Buffalo Bisons	3-0	Memorial Auditorium	5,009

=== Round 2 ===
Providence Reds 3, Cincinnati Mohawks 1

Game	Date	Visitor	Score	Home	Series	Arena	Attendance
1	March 30	Cincinnati Mohawks	1-3	Providence Reds	1–0	Rhode Island Auditorium	5,859
2	April 1	Cincinnati Mohawks	2-3	Providence Reds	2-0	Rhode Island Auditorium	N/A
3	April 3	Providence Reds	1-3	Cincinnati Mohawks	2-1	Cincinnati Gardens	4,910
4	April 5	Providence Reds	6-2	Cincinnati Mohawks	3–1	Cincinnati Gardens	7,103

=== Calder Cup Finals ===
Pittsburgh Hornets 4, Providence Reds 2

Game	Date	Visitor	Score	Home	Series	Arena	Attendance
1	April 8	Providence Reds	1-4	Pittsburgh Hornets	1–0	Duquesne Gardens	N/A
2	April 10	Providence Reds	0-5	Pittsburgh Hornets	2-0	Duquesne Gardens	N/A
3	April 13	Pittsburgh Hornets	1-5	Providence Reds	2-1	Rhode Island Auditorium	N/A
4	April 15	Pittsburgh Hornets	3-2OT	Providence Reds	2-2	Rhode Island Auditorium	N/A
5	April 17	Providence Reds	5-1	Pittsburgh Hornets	3-2	Duquesne Gardens	N/A
6	April 20	Pittsburgh Hornets	3-2OT	Providence Reds	4-2	Rhode Island Auditorium	N/A

== Trophy and Award winners ==
Team Awards

Calder Cup; Playoff champions:	Pittsburgh Hornets
F. G. "Teddy" Oke Trophy; Regular Season champions, West Division:	Pittsburgh Hornets

Individual Awards

Les Cunningham Award; Most valuable player:	Ray Powell - Providence Reds
Carl Liscombe Trophy; Top point scorer:	Ray Powell - Providence Reds
Dudley "Red" Garrett Memorial Award; Rookie of the year:	Earl Reibel - Indianapolis Capitals
Harry "Hap" Holmes Memorial Award; Lowest goals against average:	Johnny Bower - Cleveland Barons

== See also ==
- List of AHL seasons

== Newspapers ==
Attendance Figures - Cincinnati Enquirer 03-19-1952, 03-21-1952, 04-04-1952, and 04-06-1952

Preceded by 1950–51 AHL season	AHL seasons	Succeeded by 1952–53 AHL season
