= 1942–43 AHL season =

- League: American Hockey League
- Sport: Ice hockey

Regular season
- F. G. "Teddy" Oke Trophy: Buffalo Bisons

Playoffs
- Champions: Buffalo Bisons
- Runners-up: Indianapolis Capitals

AHL seasons
- 1941–42 1943–44

The 1942–43 AHL season was the seventh season of the American Hockey League. Seven teams played 56 games each in the schedule, while an eighth team, the New Haven Eagles ceased operations 32 games into the season, in January 1943. The Buffalo Bisons won the F. G. "Teddy" Oke Trophy as the Western Division champions, and their first Calder Cup as league champions.

== Team changes ==
- The Philadelphia Rockets cease operations.
- The Springfield Indians cease operations.
- The Hershey Bears switch divisions from West to East.
- The New Haven Eagles ceased operations midseason.

== Final standings ==
Notes: GP = Games played; W = Wins; L = Losses; T = Ties; GF = Goals for; GA = Goals against; Pts = Points;

East	GP	W	L	T	Pts	GF	GA
Hershey Bears (independent)	56	35	13	8	78	240	166
Providence Reds (TOR)	56	27	27	2	56	211	216
Washington Lions (MTL)	56	14	34	8	36	184	272
New Haven Eagles^{†} (independent)	32	9	18	5	23	85	116

West	GP	W	L	T	Pts	GF	GA
Buffalo Bisons (independent)	56	28	21	7	63	189	143
Indianapolis Capitals (DET)	56	29	23	4	62	211	181
Pittsburgh Hornets (independent)	56	26	24	6	58	183	203
Cleveland Barons (independent)	56	21	29	6	48	190	196

^{†} New Haven Eagles ceased operations midseason.

== Scoring leaders ==
Note: GP = Games played; G = Goals; A = Assists; Pts = Points; PIM = Penalty minutes

Player	Team	GP	G	A	Pts	PIM
Wally Kilrea	Hershey Bears	56	31	68	99	8
Adam Brown	Indianapolis Capitals	55	34	51	85	47
Harry Frost	Hershey Bears	56	43	40	83	6
Les Cunningham	Cleveland Barons	55	35	47	82	24
Norman Mann	Pittsburgh / Cleveland	55	31	45	76	83
Fred Hergerts	Hershey Bears	56	30	45	75	33
Jim O'Neill	Washington / Hershey	55	19	50	69	52
Bill Summerhill	Buffalo Bisons	56	41	27	68	64
Ab DeMarco	Providence Reds	39	27	39	66	9
Norm Locking	Cleveland Barons	56	26	40	66	14

- complete list

== Calder Cup playoffs ==
Preliminary Round
3	Indianapolis	2
4	Pittsburgh	0
5	Providence	0
6	Cleveland	2

League Semi-Final
1	Hershey	2
2	Buffalo	4
3	Indianapolis	2
6	Cleveland	0

Calder Cup Final
2	Buffalo	3
3	Indianapolis	0

== See also ==
- List of AHL seasons

Preceded by 1941–42 AHL season	AHL seasons	Succeeded by 1943–44 AHL season
