= 1948–49 AHL season =

- League: American Hockey League
- Sport: Ice hockey

Regular season
- F. G. "Teddy" Oke Trophy: St. Louis Flyers
- Season MVP: Carl Liscombe
- Top scorer: Sid Smith

Playoffs
- Champions: Providence Reds
- Runners-up: Hershey Bears

AHL seasons
- 1947–48 1949–50

The 1948–49 AHL season was the 13th season of the American Hockey League. Eleven teams played 68 games each in the schedule. The Wally Kilrea Trophy for the league's "top point scorer," is renamed the Carl Liscombe Trophy. The St. Louis Flyers won their first F. G. "Teddy" Oke Trophy as West Division champions. The Providence Reds and won their third Calder Cup as league champions.

== Final standings ==
Note: GP = Games played; W = Wins; L = Losses; T = Ties; GF = Goals for; GA = Goals against; Pts = Points;

East	GP	W	L	T	Pts	GF	GA
Providence Reds (independent)	68	44	18	6	94	347	219
Hershey Bears (BOS)	68	28	35	5	61	256	261
Springfield Indians (independent)	68	22	37	9	53	240	276
New Haven Ramblers (NYR)	68	20	40	8	48	223	286
Philadelphia Rockets (independent)	68	15	48	5	35	230	407
Washington Lions (independent)	68	11	53	4	26	179	401

West	GP	W	L	T	Pts	GF	GA
St. Louis Flyers (independent)	68	41	18	9	91	294	192
Indianapolis Capitals (DET)	68	39	17	12	90	288	209
Cleveland Barons (independent)	68	41	21	6	88	286	251
Pittsburgh Hornets (TOR)	68	39	19	10	88	301	175
Buffalo Bisons (MTL)	68	33	27	8	74	246	213

== Scoring leaders ==
Note: GP = Games played; G = Goals; A = Assists; Pts = Points; PIM = Penalty minutes

Player	Team	GP	G	A	Pts	PIM
Sid Smith	Pittsburgh Hornets	68	55	57	112	4
Carl Liscombe	Providence Reds	68	55	47	102	2
Roger Bedard	Providence Reds	67	29	61	90	45
Harvey Fraser	Providence Reds	68	34	55	89	16
Paul Gladu	St. Louis Flyers	67	51	34	85	28
Murdo MacKay	Buffalo Bisons	68	32	52	84	20
Fred Glover	Indianapolis Capitals	68	35	48	83	59
Jackie Hamilton	Providence Reds	59	26	54	80	32
Phil Maloney	Hershey Bears	64	29	50	79	21
Pete Leswick	Cleveland Barons	68	44	35	79	10

- complete list

== Calder Cup playoffs ==
Preliminary Round
E2	Hershey	2
W2	Indianapolis	0
E3	Springfield	1
W3	Cleveland	2

League Semi-Final
E1	Providence	4
W1	St. Louis	3
E2	Hershey	2
W3	Cleveland	0

Calder Cup Final
E1	Providence	4
E2	Hershey	3

== Trophy and award winners ==
Team awards

Calder Cup; Playoff champions:	Providence Reds
F. G. "Teddy" Oke Trophy; Regular Season champions, West Division:	St. Louis Flyers

Individual awards

Les Cunningham Award; Most valuable player:	Carl Liscombe - Providence Reds
Carl Liscombe Trophy; Top point scorer:	Sid Smith - Pittsburgh Hornets
Dudley "Red" Garrett Memorial Award; Rookie of the year:	Terry Sawchuk - Indianapolis Capitals
Harry "Hap" Holmes Memorial Award; Lowest goals against average:	Baz Bastien - Pittsburgh Hornets

== See also ==
- List of AHL seasons

Preceded by 1947–48 AHL season	AHL seasons	Succeeded by 1949–50 AHL season
