= 1945–46 AHL season =

- League: American Hockey League
- Sport: Ice hockey

Regular season
- F. G. "Teddy" Oke Trophy: Indianapolis Capitals

Playoffs
- Champions: Buffalo Bisons
- Runners-up: Cleveland Barons

AHL seasons
- 1944–45 1946–47

The 1945–46 AHL season was the tenth season of the American Hockey League. Eight teams played 62 games each in the schedule. The Indianapolis Capitals won their third F. G. "Teddy" Oke Trophy as West Division champions. The Buffalo Bisons won their third Calder Cup in a four-year span.

== Team changes ==
- The New Haven Eagles resume operations.

== Final standings ==
Note: GP = Games played; W = Wins; L = Losses; T = Ties; GF = Goals for; GA = Goals against; Pts = Points;

East	GP	W	L	T	Pts	GF	GA
Buffalo Bisons (MTL)	62	38	16	8	84	270	196
Hershey Bears (independent)	62	26	26	10	62	213	221
Providence Reds (independent)	62	23	33	6	52	221	254
New Haven Eagles (independent)	62	14	38	10	38	199	263

West	GP	W	L	T	Pts	GF	GA
Indianapolis Capitals (DET)	62	33	20	9	75	286	238
Pittsburgh Hornets (TOR)	62	30	22	10	70	262	226
Cleveland Barons (independent)	62	28	26	8	64	269	254
St. Louis Flyers (independent)	62	21	32	9	51	198	266

== Scoring leaders ==
Note: GP = Games played; G = Goals; A = Assists; Pts = Points; PIM = Penalty minutes

Player	Team	GP	G	A	Pts	PIM
Les Douglas	Indianapolis Capitals	62	44	46	90	35
Norm Larson	New Haven / Hershey	64	36	53	89	20
Tom Burlington	Cleveland Barons	59	36	46	82	14
Pete Leswick	Indianapolis Capitals	61	29	52	81	10
Louis Trudel	Cleveland Barons	61	33	46	79	24
Joe Bell	New Haven / Hershey	62	46	31	77	26
Les Cunningham	Cleveland Barons	62	33	44	77	10
Maurice Rimstad	St. Louis Flyers	62	34	43	77	15
Wally Wilson	Pittsburgh Hornets	57	34	41	75	32
Gino Rozzini	Hershey Bears	56	31	40	71	63

- complete list

== Calder Cup playoffs ==
Preliminary Round
E2	Hershey	1
W2	Pittsburgh	2
E3	Providence Reds	0
W3	Cleveland	2

League Semi-Final
E1	Buffalo	4
W1	Indianapolis	1
W2	Pittsburgh	1
W3	Cleveland	2

Calder Cup Final
E1	Buffalo	4
W3	Cleveland	3

== See also ==
- List of AHL seasons

== Bibliography ==
- AHL official site
- AHL Hall of Fame
- HockeyDB

Preceded by 1944–45 AHL season	AHL seasons	Succeeded by 1946–47 AHL season
