= 1946–47 AHL season =

- League: American Hockey League
- Sport: Ice hockey

Regular season
- F. G. "Teddy" Oke Trophy: Cleveland Barons

Playoffs
- Champions: Hershey Bears
- Runners-up: Pittsburgh Hornets

AHL seasons
- 1945–46 1947–48

The 1946–47 AHL season was the 11th season of the American Hockey League. Ten teams played 64 games each in the schedule. The Cleveland Barons won their fifth F. G. "Teddy" Oke Trophy as West Division champions. The Hershey Bears won their first Calder Cup.

== Team changes ==
- The New Haven Eagles are renamed the New Haven Ramblers.
- The Springfield Indians resume operations, playing in the East Division.
- A new Philadelphia Rockets joined as an expansion team, playing in the East Division.
- The Buffalo Bisons switch from the East Division to the West Division.

== Final standings ==
Note: GP = Games played; W = Wins; L = Losses; T = Ties; GF = Goals for; GA = Goals against; Pts = Points;

East	GP	W	L	T	Pts	GF	GA
Hershey Bears (BOS)	64	36	16	12	84	276	174
Springfield Indians (independent)	64	24	29	11	59	202	220
New Haven Ramblers (NYR)	64	23	31	10	56	199	218
Providence Reds (independent)	64	21	33	10	52	226	281
Philadelphia Rockets (independent)	64	5	52	7	17	188	400

West	GP	W	L	T	Pts	GF	GA
Cleveland Barons (independent)	64	38	18	8	84	272	215
Buffalo Bisons (MTL)	64	36	17	11	83	257	173
Pittsburgh Hornets (TOR)	64	35	19	10	80	260	188
Indianapolis Capitals (DET)	64	33	18	13	79	285	215
St. Louis Flyers (independent)	64	17	35	12	46	211	292

== Scoring leaders ==
Note: GP = Games played; G = Goals; A = Assists; Pts = Points; PIM = Penalty minutes

Player	Team	GP	G	A	Pts	PIM
Phil Hergesheimer	Philadelphia Rockets	64	48	44	92	20
Bob Carse	Cleveland Barons	62	27	61	88	16
Johnny Holota	Cleveland Barons	64	52	35	87	28
Les Douglas	Indianapolis Capitals	51	26	57	83	26
Cliff Simpson	Indianapolis Capitals	54	42	36	78	28
John Chad	Providence Reds	63	32	43	75	12
Pete Leswick	Cleveland Barons	64	32	41	73	35
Frank Mario	Hershey Bears	64	24	47	71	65

- complete list

== Calder Cup playoffs ==
Preliminary Round
E2	Springfield	0
W2	Buffalo	2
E3	New Haven	1
W3	Pittsburgh	2

League Semi-Final
E1	Hershey	4
W1	Cleveland	0
W2	Buffalo	0
W3	Pittsburgh	2

Calder Cup Final
E1	Hershey	4
W3	Pittsburgh	3

== See also ==
- List of AHL seasons

Preceded by 1945–46 AHL season	AHL seasons	Succeeded by 1947–48 AHL season
