= 1947–48 AHL season =

- League: American Hockey League
- Sport: Ice hockey

Regular season
- F. G. "Teddy" Oke Trophy: Cleveland Barons
- Season MVP: Carl Liscombe
- Top scorer: Carl Liscombe

Playoffs
- Champions: Cleveland Barons
- Runners-up: Buffalo Bisons

AHL seasons
- 1946–47 1948–49

The 1947–48 AHL season was the 12th season of the American Hockey League. Eleven teams played 68 games each in the schedule. The Cleveland Barons won their sixth F. G. "Teddy" Oke Trophy as West Division champions, and won their fourth Calder Cup as league champions.

It was the first season, the AHL awarded individual trophies for players. The awards would be, the Les Cunningham Award for the league's "most valuable player," the Wally Kilrea Trophy for the league's "top point scorer," the Dudley "Red" Garrett Memorial Award" for the league's rookie of the year," and the Harry "Hap" Holmes Memorial Award for the goaltender with the "lowest Goals against average" in the league.

== Team changes ==
- The Washington Lions resume operations, playing in the East Division.

== Final standings ==
Note: GP = Games played; W = Wins; L = Losses; T = Ties; GF = Goals for; GA = Goals against; Pts = Points;

East	GP	W	L	T	Pts	GF	GA
Providence Reds (independent)	68	41	23	4	86	342	277
New Haven Ramblers (NYR)	68	31	30	7	69	254	242
Hershey Bears (BOS)	68	25	30	13	63	240	273
Philadelphia Rockets (independent)	68	22	41	5	49	260	331
Springfield Indians (independent)	68	19	42	7	45	237	308
Washington Lions (independent)	68	17	45	6	40	241	369

West	GP	W	L	T	Pts	GF	GA
Cleveland Barons (independent)	68	43	13	12	98	332	197
Pittsburgh Hornets (CHI/TOR)	68	38	18	12	88	238	170
Buffalo Bisons (MTL)	68	41	23	4	86	277	238
Indianapolis Capitals (DET)	68	32	30	6	70	293	260
St. Louis Flyers (independent)	68	22	36	10	54	242	291

== Scoring leaders ==
Note: GP = Games played; G = Goals; A = Assists; Pts = Points; PIM = Penalty minutes

Player	Team	GP	G	A	Pts	PIM
Carl Liscombe	Providence Reds	68	50	68	118	10
Cliff Simpson	Indianapolis Capitals	68	48	62	110	31
Harvey Fraser	Providence Reds	64	45	52	97	12
John Chad	Providence Reds	67	41	53	94	8
Paul Courteau	Springfield Indians	68	28	64	92	36
Wally Stefaniw	Philadelphia Rockets	67	15	72	87	22
Johnny Holota	Cleveland Barons	68	48	38	86	11
Johnny Mahaffey	Philadelphia Rockets	60	26	57	83	6
Chuck Scherza	Providence Reds	68	18	65	83	72
Eldred Kobussen	Springfield Indians	67	40	42	82	24

- complete list

== Calder Cup playoffs ==
Preliminary Round
E2	New Haven	2
W2	Pittsburgh	0
E3	Hershey	0
W3	Buffalo	2

League Semi-Final
E1	Providence	1
W1	Cleveland	4
E2	New Haven	0
W3	Buffalo	2

Calder Cup Final
W1	Cleveland	4
W3	Buffalo	0

== Trophy and Award winners ==
Team Awards

Calder Cup; Playoff champions:	Cleveland Barons
F. G. "Teddy" Oke Trophy; Regular Season champions, West Division:	Cleveland Barons

Individual Awards

Les Cunningham Award; Most valuable player:	Carl Liscombe - Providence Reds
Wally Kilrea Trophy; Top point scorer:	Carl Liscombe - Providence Reds
Dudley "Red" Garrett Memorial Award; Rookie of the year:	Bob Solinger - Cleveland Barons
Harry "Hap" Holmes Memorial Award; Lowest goals against average:	Baz Bastien - Pittsburgh Hornets

== See also ==
- List of AHL seasons

Preceded by 1946–47 AHL season	AHL seasons	Succeeded by 1948–49 AHL season
