= 1941–42 AHL season =

- League: American Hockey League
- Sport: Ice hockey

Regular season
- F. G. "Teddy" Oke Trophy: Indianapolis Capitals

Playoffs
- Champions: Indianapolis Capitals
- Runners-up: Hershey Bears

AHL seasons
- 1940–41 1942–43

The 1941–42 AHL season was the sixth season of the American Hockey League. Ten teams played 56 games each in the schedule. The Indianapolis Capitals won the F. G. "Teddy" Oke Trophy as the Western Division champions, and the Calder Cup as league champions.

== Team changes ==
- The Philadelphia Ramblers are renamed the Philadelphia Rockets.
- The Washington Lions join the AHL as an expansion team, based in Washington, D.C., playing in the East Division.

== Final standings ==
Notes: GP = Games played; W = Wins; L = Losses; T = Ties; GF = Goals for; GA = Goals against; Pts = Points;

East	GP	W	L	T	Pts	GF	GA
Springfield Indians (BRK)	56	31	20	5	67	213	167
New Haven Eagles (NYR)	56	26	26	4	56	182	219
Washington Lions (MTL)	56	20	30	6	46	160	172
Providence Reds (independent)	56	17	32	7	41	205	237
Philadelphia Rockets (independent)	56	11	41	4	26	157	254

West	GP	W	L	T	Pts	GF	GA
Indianapolis Capitals (DET)	56	34	15	7	75	204	144
Hershey Bears (BOS)	56	33	17	6	72	207	169
Cleveland Barons (independent)	56	33	19	4	70	174	152
Buffalo Bisons (independent)	56	25	25	6	56	182	157
Pittsburgh Hornets (independent)	56	23	28	5	51	210	223

== Scoring leaders ==
Note: GP = Games played; G = Goals; A = Assists; Pts = Points; PIM = Penalty minutes

Player	Team	GP	G	A	Pts	PIM
Pete Kelly	Springfield Indians	46	33	44	77	11
Louis Trudel	Washington Lions	54	37	29	66	11
John O'Flaherty	Springfield Indians	42	18	44	62	24
Ab DeMarco	Providence Reds	39	27	39	61	9
Norman Schultz	Pittsburgh Hornets	56	27	34	61	16
Les Cunningham	Cleveland Barons	56	25	35	60	23
Norm Burns	New Haven Eagles	35	27	32	59	13
James MacDonald	Hershey / Buffalo	58	28	30	58	18
John Sherf	Pittsburgh Hornets	56	19	37	56	10
Norm Calladine	Providence Reds	56	32	33	54	6

- complete list

== Calder Cup playoffs ==
Preliminary Round
E2	New Haven	0
W2	Hershey	2
E3	Washington	0
W3	Cleveland	2

League Semi-Final
E1	Springfield	2
W1	Indianapolis	3
W2	Hershey	2
W3	Cleveland	1

Calder Cup Final
W1	Indianapolis	3
W2	Hershey	2

== All Star Classic ==
The first AHL All-Star game was played on February 3, 1942, at the Cleveland Arena in Cleveland, Ohio. The East division All-Stars defeated the West division All-Stars 5–4.

== See also ==
- List of AHL seasons

Preceded by 1940–41 AHL season	AHL seasons	Succeeded by 1942–43 AHL season
