= St. Louis Flyers =

Minor league hockey team

- City: St. Louis, Missouri
- League: American Hockey Association; American Hockey League
- Operated: 1928–1942; 1944–1953
- Home arena: St. Louis Arena

Franchise history
- 1925–1928: Winnipeg Maroons
- 1928–1953: St. Louis Flyers

Championships
- Regular season titles: 6: 1934–35, 1936–37, 1937–38, 1938–39, 1939–40, 1940–41)
- Division titles: 1 AHA: 1941–42 (North); 1 AHL: 1948–49 (West)
- Playoff championships: 5 AHA: 1934–35, 1935–36, 1937–38, 1938–39, 1940–41

The St. Louis Flyers were a minor league ice hockey team, based in St. Louis, Missouri, playing home games at the St. Louis Arena in the Cheltenham, St. Louis neighborhood, across from Forest Park.

The Flyers played fourteen seasons in the American Hockey Association from 1928 to 1942, and played nine seasons in the American Hockey League from 1944–45 through 1952–53. This was St. Louis' first and only AHL team.

== Season-by-season results ==
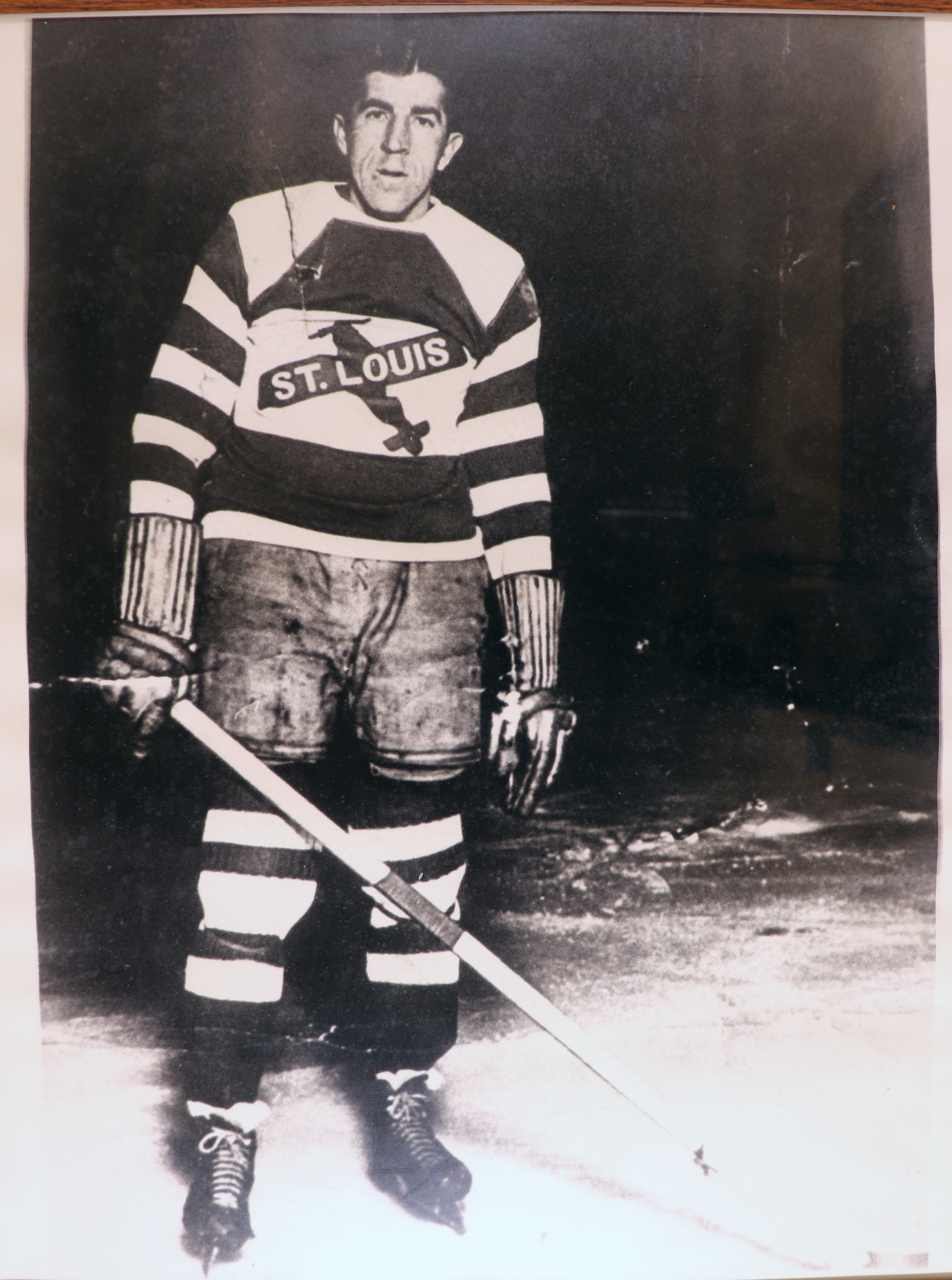
Lawrence Goyer playing for St Louis Flyers c. 1930

- 1928–1942 (American Hockey Association)
- 1944–1953 (American Hockey League)

=== Regular season ===
Season	Games	Won	Lost	Tied	Points	Goals for	Goals against	Standing
1928–29	40	10	28	2	22	73	138	6th, AHA
1929–30	48	12	25	11	35	98	129	6th, AHA
1930–31	47	11	36	0	22	84	162	7th, AHA
1931–32	48	18	22	8	36	80	97	4th, AHA
1932–33 ^{1}	21	11	9	1	22	48	43	2nd, AHA
1932–33 ²	24	13	11	0	26	64	47	2nd, AHA
1933–34	48	26	18	4	52	97	84	2nd, AHA
1934–35	48	29	15	4	58	151	102	1st, AHA
1935–36	48	27	17	4	52	115	90	2nd, AHA
1936–37	48	32	13	3	64	143	90	1st, AHA
1937–38	48	29	14	5	58	143	102	1st, AHA
1938–39	52	36	12	4	72	183	95	1st, AHA
1939–40	48	37	11	0	74	195	99	1st, AHA
1940–41	48	31	17	0	62	139	99	1st, AHA
1941–42	50	30	15	5	65	141	103	1st, North
1944–45	60	14	38	8	36	157	257	4th, West
1945–46	62	21	32	9	51	198	266	4th, West
1946–47	64	17	35	12	46	211	292	5th, West
1947–48	68	22	36	10	54	242	291	5th, West
1948–49	68	41	18	9	91	294	192	1st, West
1949–50	70	34	28	8	76	258	250	3rd, West
1950–51	70	32	34	4	68	233	252	4th, West
1951–52	68	28	39	1	57	256	262	4th, West
1952–53	64	26	37	1	53	212	258	6th, AHL

^{1,2} Split season during 1931–32 season.

=== Playoffs ===
Season	1st round	2nd round	Finals
1928–29	Out of playoffs		
1929–30	Out of playoffs		
1930–31	Out of playoffs		
1931–32	Lost, CHI	—	—
1932–33	2nd place in double round-robin versus KC & TUL		
1933–34	—	—	L, 0–3, KC
1934–35	—	—	W, 3–0, TUL (AHA); L, 0–3, StP (CHL)
1935–36	Won, TUL	—	W, 3–2, StP
1936–37	Won, StP	—	L, 0–3, MIN
1937–38	Won, TUL	—	W, 3–0, MIN
1938–39	Won, StP	—	W, 3–1, TUL
1939–40	Lost, OMA	—	—
1940–41	—	—	W, 3–2, KC
1941–42	Lost, OMA	—	—
1944–45	Out of playoffs		
1945–46	Out of playoffs		
1946–47	Out of playoffs		
1947–48	Out of playoffs		
1948–49	L, 3–4, PROV	—	—
1949–50	L, 0–2, IND	—	—
1950–51	Out of playoffs		
1951–52	Out of playoffs		
1952–53	Out of playoffs		
