= Indianapolis Capitals =

- City: Indianapolis, Indiana
- League: American Hockey League
- Operated: 1939–1952
- Home arena: Indiana State Fairgrounds Coliseum
- Affiliates: Detroit Red Wings (NHL)

Championships
- Regular season titles: 1: (1941–42)
- Division titles: 3: (1939–40, 1941–42, 1945–46)
- Calder Cups: 2: (1941–42, 1949–50)

The Indianapolis Capitals were an American Hockey League professional ice hockey team based in Indianapolis, Indiana, from 1939 to 1952. The Capitals were a farm team for the Detroit Red Wings. Indianapolis won the Calder Cup in 1942 and 1950. They played in the Indiana State Fairgrounds Coliseum.

There was also a Central Hockey League team with a similar name, the Indianapolis Capitals, that in 1963 played in the same arena. They played nine games before being relocated to Cincinnati to play as the Cincinnati Wings due to an explosion that rendered the Coliseum unusable. The team was again relocated this time to Memphis, Tennessee, for the 1964–65 season, where they were renamed the Memphis Wings. Their last season was the 1966–67 season.

== Season-by-season results ==
- Indianapolis Capitals 1939–1940 (International-American Hockey League)
- Indianapolis Capitals 1940–1952 (American Hockey League)

=== Regular season ===
Season	Games	Won	Lost	Tied	Points	Goals for	Goals against	Standing
1939–40	56	26	20	10	62	174	144	1st, West
1940–41	56	17	28	11	45	133	168	5th, West
1941–42	56	34	15	7	75	204	144	1st, West
1942–43	56	29	23	4	62	211	181	2nd, West
1943–44	54	20	18	16	56	156	156	2nd, West
1944–45	60	25	11	24	61	169	167	2nd, West
1945–46	62	33	20	9	75	286	238	1st, West
1946–47	64	33	18	13	79	285	215	4th, West
1947–48	68	32	30	6	70	293	260	4th, West
1948–49	68	39	17	12	90	288	209	2nd, West
1949–50	70	35	24	11	81	267	231	2nd, West
1950–51	70	38	29	3	79	287	255	2nd, West
1951–52	68	22	40	6	50	232	273	5th, West

=== Playoffs ===
Season	1st round	2nd round	Finals
1939–40	Lost, Providence	—	—
1940–41	Out of playoffs		
1941–42	W, 3–2, Springfield	N/A	W, 3–2, Hershey
1942–43	W, 2–0, Pittsburgh	W, 2–0, Cleveland	L, 0–3, Buffalo
1943–44	L, 1–4, Buffalo	—	—
1944–45	L, 1–4, Hershey	—	—
1945–46	L, 1–4, Buffalo	—	—
1946–47	Out of playoffs		
1947–48	Out of playoffs		
1948–49	L, 0–2, Hershey	—	—
1949–50	W, 2–0, St. Louis	W, 2–0, Providence	W, 4–0, Cleveland
1950–51	L, 0–3, Hershey	—	—
1951–52	Out of playoffs		

== Players ==
=== American Hockey League Hall of Famers ===
AHL Hall of Fame Honored Members
Name	Seasons	Induction Year
Fred Glover	1948-52 (player)	2006
Steve Kraftcheck	1950-51 (player)	2008
Larry Wilson	1950-52 (player)	2017
