= Roger DeJordy =

Canadian ice hockey player

- Born: August 28, 1937 St. Hyacinthe, Quebec, Canada
- Died: April 5, 2019 (aged 81) Edmonton, Alberta, Canada
- Height: 5 ft 11 in (180 cm)
- Weight: 165 lb (75 kg; 11 st 11 lb)
- Position: Left wing
- Shot: Left
- Played for: Hershey Bears
- Playing career: 1954–1971

Roger DeJordy (August 28, 1937 – April 5, 2019) was a Canadian professional ice hockey player who played for the Hershey Bears in the American Hockey League. Dejordy, whose brother Denis DeJordy was an award winning NHL goalie, was enshrined in the Hershey Bears Hockey Club Hall of Fame in 2015.
