= Cleveland Barons (1937–1973) =

American Hockey League (1937–1973)

- City: Cleveland, Ohio
- League: American Hockey League
- Operated: 1937–February 1973
- Home arena: Cleveland Arena
- Colors: Royal blue, white

Franchise history
- 1929–1934 IHL: Cleveland Indians
- 1934–1937 IHL/I-AHL: Cleveland Falcons
- 1937–1973 I-AHL/AHL: Cleveland Barons
- 1973–1974: Jacksonville Barons
- 1974–1975: Syracuse Eagles

Championships
- Regular season titles: 8 (1937–38, 1943–44, 1944–45, 1946–47, 1947–48, 1949–50, 1950–51, 1952–53)
- Division titles: 10 (1937–38, 1940–41, 1943–44, 1944–45, 1946–47, 1947–48, 1949–50, 1950–51, 1952–53, 1961–62)
- Calder Cups: 9 (1938–39, 1940–41, 1944–45, 1947–48, 1950–51, 1952–53, 1953–54, 1956–57, 1963–64)

The Cleveland Barons were a minor league professional ice hockey team in the American Hockey League. They played in Cleveland, Ohio, at the Cleveland Arena. At the time they folded, they were the most successful team in AHL history, the original incarnation of the Barons played in the AHL from 1937 to 1973. In that time, they won ten division titles and nine Calder Cups, which, although the team had been defunct for over three decades, remained a record until 2009, when the Hershey Bears won their 10th Calder Cup. In 1973, they relocated to Jacksonville, Florida, where they were known as the Jacksonville Barons; they lasted only through the 1973–1974 season before folding.

== History ==
Barons alternate logo.

The team traces its roots back to the 1929–30 season of the International Hockey League, as the "Cleveland Indians." The Indians played for five seasons, until being renamed the Cleveland Falcons for the 1934–35 season. The Falcons played for three more years, when they became the Barons in 1937–38.

From 1934 to 1949, the team was owned by Al Sutphin, who was also an owner of the Braden-Sutphin Ink Company in Cleveland. Sutphin, a true sportsman, was known to often pay better salaries than NHL teams at the time (1930s and 1940s), and some players preferred to remain in "minor league" Cleveland instead of playing in the "major" NHL. Sutphin built the Cleveland Arena, at the time one of the largest and most beautiful hockey facilities in North America. It was rumored that the dormant Montreal Maroons NHL franchise would be transferred to Cleveland but nothing came of it.

Sutphin sold the team and arena in 1949. The Barons sought acceptance into the National Hockey League during the early 1950s, but purported financing irregularities caused the NHL to turn down the bid. The Barons then challenged the NHL for the right to play for the Stanley Cup, which was also rejected. During the 1940s and 1950s, the Barons played to standing-room-only audiences.

The preeminent star of the franchise was Fred Glover, the team's career leader in goals, assists, points, penalty minutes and seasons, (and second in league history in all those categories). Also notable was Hall of Famer goaltender Johnny Bower, who before he starred in the NHL played brilliantly for the Barons for nine seasons and is the AHL's career shutout leader. From 1949 to 1961, the Barons' general manager was James C. Hendy, a Hall of Fame Builder and the first prominent statistician in the history of the sport. Other notable players included Les Cunningham, a five-time league All-Star for whom the AHL's MVP award is named, Jack Gordon, Norm Beaudin, Bill Needham (the team's career leader in games played), Cal Stearns, Fred Thurier and Les Binkley.

In 1972, Barons owner Nick Mileti became the owner of a new team in the World Hockey Association (WHA), which had been founded as a second major league in competition with the NHL. The appearance of this new team, the Cleveland Crusaders, saw the market for the minor league product vanish almost overnight. The Barons could not compete with the WHA practice of hiring ex-NHL players whose contracts had expired, and consequently lost many fans. In addition, creation of the new "major league" drew much of the established talent away from the AHL. Mileti decided the teams could not co-exist, and moved the Barons mid-season in January 1973, to Jacksonville, Florida. Scheduling conflicts caused the Barons to stay in Cleveland for a month. The Barons played their last game in Cleveland, a 5-1 loss to the Richmond Robins on February 4, 1973, on front of 435 fans. The Jacksonville Barons, as they were then known, played in the Jacksonville Coliseum, which had previously been home to the Jacksonville Rockets of the Eastern Hockey League. The Barons drew a crowd of 9,189 to their first game in the Jacksonville, but attendance declined afterward. They played one further season in Jacksonville before Mileti determined the franchise was not viable. Stating that he had lost around $1 million, he folded the team and sold it to a group in Syracuse, New York, which became the Syracuse Eagles.

The team was replaced in this market by:

- Cleveland Crusaders of the WHA (1972–1976)
- A second team called the Cleveland Barons, this time in the NHL (1976–1978)
- Cleveland Lumberjacks of the IHL (1992–2001)
- A third Cleveland Barons, second in AHL (2001–2006)
- Lake Erie/Cleveland Monsters (2007–present) of the AHL

== Team records ==
Single season
Goals: Roy Kelly, 46, 1950
Assists: Fred Glover, 69, 1960
Points: Glover, 107, 1960
Career
Career goals: Glover, 410
Career assists: Glover, 695
Career points: Glover, 1105
Career penalty minutes: Glover, 2164
Career goaltending Wins: Johnny Bower, 284
Career shutouts: Bower, 38
Career games: Bill Needham, 981

=== American Hockey League Hall of Famers ===
AHL Hall of Fame Honored Members
| Name | Seasons | Induction Year |
|---|---|---|
| Johnny Bower | 1945-53, 1957-58 (player) | 2006 |
| Fred "Bun" Cook | 1943-56 (head coach) | 2007 |
| Les Cunningham | 1936-39, 1940-47 (player) | 2009 |
| Bill Dineen | 1959-61 (player) | 2014 |
| Fred Glover | 1952-68 (player); 1962-68 (head coach) | 2006 |
| Jack Gordon | 1951-61 (player); 1956-62, 1968-70 (head coach) | 2012 |
| Jim Hendy | 1949-61 (general manager) | 2015 |
| Steve Kraftcheck | 1949-50, 1953-58 (player) | 2008 |
| Bruce Landon | 1973-74 (player) | 2016 |
| Gil Mayer | 1959-61 (player) | 2007 |
| Marcel Paille | 1956-57 (player) | 2010 |
| Art Stratton | 1955-56, 1958-59 (player) | 2015 |
| Fred Thurier | 1945-52 (player) | 2020 |

== Season-by-season results ==
- Cleveland Indians 1929–1934 (International Hockey League)
- Cleveland Falcons 1934–1936 (International Hockey League)
- Cleveland Falcons 1936–1937 (International-American Hockey League)
- Cleveland Barons 1937–1940 (International-American Hockey League)
- Cleveland Barons 1940–1972
- Cleveland / Jacksonville Barons 1972–1973
- Jacksonville Barons 1973–1974

=== Regular season ===
| Season | Games | Won | Lost | Tied | Points | Goals for | Goals against | Standing |
|---|---|---|---|---|---|---|---|---|
| 1929–30 | 42 | 24 | 9 | 9 | 57 | 125 | 78 | 1st, IHL |
| 1930–31 | 48 | 24 | 18 | 6 | 54 | 131 | 112 | 3rd, IHL |
| 1931–32 | 48 | 15 | 25 | 8 | 38 | 110 | 142 | 7th, IHL |
| 1932–33 | 42 | 10 | 27 | 5 | 25 | 100 | 147 | 6th, IHL |
| 1933–34 | 44 | 16 | 24 | 4 | 36 | 104 | 121 | 6th, IHL |
| 1934–35 | 44 | 20 | 23 | 1 | 40 | 115 | 132 | 4th, IHL |
| 1935–36 | 48 | 25 | 19 | 4 | 54 | 149 | 146 | 2nd, West |
| 1936–37 | 48 | 13 | 27 | 8 | 34 | 113 | 152 | 3rd, West |
| 1937–38 | 48 | 25 | 12 | 11 | 61 | 126 | 114 | 1st, West |
| 1938–39 | 54 | 23 | 22 | 9 | 55 | 145 | 138 | 3rd, West |
| 1939–40 | 56 | 24 | 24 | 8 | 56 | 127 | 130 | 4th, West |
| 1940–41 | 56 | 26 | 21 | 9 | 61 | 177 | 162 | 1st, West |
| 1941–42 | 56 | 33 | 19 | 4 | 70 | 174 | 152 | 3rd, West |
| 1942–43 | 56 | 21 | 29 | 6 | 48 | 190 | 196 | 4th, West |
| 1943–44 | 54 | 33 | 14 | 7 | 73 | 224 | 176 | 1st, West |
| 1944–45 | 60 | 34 | 10 | 16 | 78 | 256 | 199 | 1st, West |
| 1945–46 | 62 | 28 | 26 | 8 | 64 | 269 | 254 | 3rd, West |
| 1946–47 | 64 | 38 | 18 | 8 | 84 | 272 | 215 | 1st, West |
| 1947–48 | 68 | 43 | 13 | 12 | 98 | 332 | 197 | 1st, West |
| 1948–49 | 68 | 41 | 21 | 6 | 88 | 286 | 251 | 3rd, West |
| 1949–50 | 70 | 45 | 15 | 10 | 100 | 357 | 230 | 1st, West |
| 1950–51 | 71 | 44 | 22 | 5 | 93 | 281 | 221 | 1st, West |
| 1951–52 | 68 | 44 | 19 | 5 | 93 | 265 | 166 | 2nd, West |
| 1952–53 | 64 | 42 | 20 | 2 | 86 | 248 | 164 | 1st, AHL |
| 1953–54 | 70 | 38 | 32 | 0 | 76 | 269 | 227 | 3rd, AHL |
| 1954–55 | 64 | 32 | 29 | 3 | 67 | 254 | 222 | 2nd, AHL |
| 1955–56 | 64 | 26 | 31 | 7 | 59 | 225 | 231 | 4th, AHL |
| 1956–57 | 64 | 35 | 26 | 3 | 73 | 249 | 210 | 2nd, AHL |
| 1957–58 | 70 | 39 | 28 | 3 | 81 | 232 | 163 | 2nd, AHL |
| 1958–59 | 70 | 37 | 30 | 3 | 77 | 261 | 252 | 2nd, AHL |
| 1959–60 | 72 | 34 | 30 | 8 | 76 | 267 | 229 | 4th, AHL |
| 1960–61 | 72 | 36 | 35 | 1 | 73 | 231 | 234 | 3rd, AHL |
| 1961–62 | 70 | 39 | 28 | 3 | 81 | 255 | 203 | 1st, West |
| 1962–63 | 72 | 31 | 34 | 7 | 69 | 270 | 253 | 2nd, West |
| 1963–64 | 72 | 37 | 30 | 5 | 79 | 239 | 207 | 3rd, West |
| 1964–65 | 72 | 24 | 43 | 5 | 53 | 228 | 285 | 4th, West |
| 1965–66 | 72 | 38 | 32 | 2 | 78 | 243 | 217 | 2nd, West |
| 1966–67 | 72 | 36 | 27 | 9 | 81 | 284 | 230 | 3rd, West |
| 1967–68 | 72 | 28 | 30 | 14 | 70 | 236 | 255 | 4th, West |
| 1968–69 | 74 | 30 | 32 | 12 | 72 | 213 | 245 | 2nd, West |
| 1969–70 | 72 | 23 | 33 | 16 | 62 | 222 | 255 | 4th, West |
| 1970–71 | 72 | 39 | 26 | 7 | 85 | 272 | 208 | 2nd, West |
| 1971–72 | 76 | 32 | 34 | 10 | 74 | 269 | 263 | 4th, West |
| 1972–73 | 76 | 23 | 44 | 9 | 55 | 251 | 329 | 5th, West |
| 1973–74 | 76 | 24 | 44 | 8 | 56 | 244 | 334 | 5th, South |

=== Playoffs ===
| Season | 1st round | 2nd round | Finals |
|---|---|---|---|
| 1929–30 | W, 2–0, London | — | W, 3–1, Buffalo |
| 1930–31 | 3rd place in double round robin. | | |
| 1931–32 | Out of playoffs | | |
| 1932–33 | Out of playoffs | | |
| 1933–34 | Out of playoffs | | |
| 1934–35 | L, 0–2, London | — | — |
| 1935–36 | L, 1–3, Buffalo | — | — |
| 1936–37 | Data unavailable | | |
| 1937–38 | Data unavailable | | |
| 1938–39 | ?? | ?? | W, 3–1, Philadelphia |
| 1939–40 | Out of playoffs | | |
| 1940–41 | W, 3–1, Providence | bye | W, 3–2, Hershey |
| 1941–42 | W, 2–0, Washington | L, 1–2, Hershey | — |
| 1942–43 | W, 2–0, Providence | L, 0–2, Indianapolis | — |
| 1943–44 | W, 4–3, Hershey | — | L, 0–4, Buffalo |
| 1944–45 | W, 4–2, Buffalo | — | W, 4–2, Hershey |
| 1945–46 | W, 2–0, Providence | W, 2–1, Pittsburgh | L, 3–4, Buffalo |
| 1946–47 | L, 0–4, Hershey | — | — |
| 1947–48 | W, 4–1, Providence | bye | W, 4–0, Buffalo |
| 1948–49 | W, 2–1, Springfield | L, 0–2, Hershey | — |
| 1949–50 | W, 4–1, Buffalo | bye | L, 0–4, Indianapolis |
| 1950–51 | W, 4–0, Buffalo | bye | W, 4–3, Pittsburgh |
| 1951–52 | L, 2–3, Providence | — | — |
| 1952–53 | W, 3–1, Syracuse | — | W, 4–3, Pittsburgh |
| 1953–54 | W, 3–0, Buffalo | — | W, 4–2, Hershey |
| 1954–55 | L, 1–3, Buffalo | — | — |
| 1955–56 | W, 3–1, Pittsburgh | — | L, 0–4, Providence |
| 1956–57 | W, 4–3, Hershey | — | W, 4–1, Rochester |
| 1957–58 | L, 3–4, Springfield | — | — |
| 1958–59 | L, 3–4, Hershey | — | — |
| 1959–60 | L, 3–4, Rochester | — | — |
| 1960–61 | L, 0–4, Springfield | — | — |
| 1961–62 | L, 2–4, Springfield | — | — |
| 1962–63 | W, 2–0, Rochester | L, 2–3, Hershey | — |
| 1963–64 | W, 2–0, Rochester | W, 3–0, Hershey | W, 4–0, Quebec |
| 1964–65 | Out of playoffs | | |
| 1965–66 | W, 3–0, Pittsburgh | W, 3–0, Springfield | L, 2–4, Rochester |
| 1966–67 | L, 2–3, Rochester | — | — |
| 1967–68 | Out of playoffs | | |
| 1968–69 | L, 2–3, Quebec | — | — |
| 1969–70 | Out of playoffs | | |
| 1970–71 | W, 3–1, Hershey | L, 1–3, Springfield | — |
| 1971–72 | L, 2–4, Baltimore | — | — |
| 1972–73 | Out of playoffs | | |
| 1973–74 | Out of playoffs | | |
