= Fred Hergert =

Canadian ice hockey player

- Born: January 29, 1912; Calgary, Alberta, Canada
- Died: July 15, 1998 (aged 85)
- Height: 6 ft 0 in (183 cm)
- Weight: 190 lb (86 kg; 13 st 8 lb)
- Position: Centre
- Shot: Left
- Played for: New York Americans
- Playing career: 1931–1951

Frederick Hergert (January 29, 1912 — July 15, 1998) was a Canadian professional ice hockey player who played 19 games in the National Hockey League with the New York Americans between 1935 and 1936. The rest of his career, which lasted from 1931 to 1951, was spent in the minor leagues. He was born in Calgary, Alberta.

== Career statistics ==
=== Regular season and playoffs ===
			Regular season					Playoffs
Season	Team	League	GP	G	A	Pts	PIM	GP	G	A	Pts	PIM
1928–29	Calgary Shamrocks	CCJHL	3	0	0	0	0	—	—	—	—	—
1929–30	Calgary Canadians	CCJHL	—	—	—	—	—	—	—	—	—	—
1930–31	Calgary Canadians	CCJHL	2	1	2	3	0	2	0	0	0	0
1930–31	Calgary Canadians	M-Cup	—	—	—	—	—	8	3	2	5	4
1931–32	Calgary Bronks	ASHL	20	9	12	21	50	3	2	1	3	2
1931–32	Calgary Bronks	Al-Cup	—	—	—	—	—	11	6	3	9	12
1932–33	Drumheller Miners	ASHL	15	11	9	20	12	5	1	1	2	2
1933–34	Cleveland Indians	IHL	14	0	0	0	0	—	—	—	—	—
1933–34	Syracuse Stars	IHL	23	1	3	4	11	6	1	0	1	2
1934–35	New York Americans	NHL	19	2	4	6	2	—	—	—	—	—
1934–35	Philadelphia Arrows	Can-Am	26	6	10	16	23	—	—	—	—	—
1935–36	New York Americans	NHL	1	0	0	0	0	—	—	—	—	—
1935–36	Rochester Cardinals	IHL	4	0	0	0	0	—	—	—	—	—
1935–36	Detroit Olympics	IHL	41	6	6	12	34	6	1	0	1	10
1936–37	Pittsburgh Hornets	IAHL	24	1	6	7	20	5	0	0	0	0
1936–37	Cleveland Falcons	IAHL	26	3	9	12	27	—	—	—	—	—
1937–38	Kansas City Greyhounds	AHA	48	16	22	38	19	—	—	—	—	—
1938–39	St. Louis Flyers	AHA	39	16	36	52	40	2	0	1	1	0
1939–40	St. Louis Flyers	AHA	48	23	48	71	31	5	2	1	3	8
1940–41	St. Louis Flyers	AHA	48	11	33	44	26	9	1	3	4	2
1941–42	St. Louis Flyers	AHA	44	15	13	28	22	3	1	1	2	0
1942–43	Hershey Bears	AHL	56	30	45	75	33	6	0	6	6	2
1943–44	Hershey Bears	AHL	53	19	31	50	43	—	—	—	—	—
1944–45	St. Louis Flyers	AHL	55	23	36	59	21	—	—	—	—	—
1945–46	St. Louis Flyers	AHL	58	9	32	41	34	—	—	—	—	—
1946–47	St. Louis Flyers	AHL	46	3	9	12	20	—	—	—	—	—
1947–48	Calgary Stampeders	WCSHL	45	2	12	14	78	11	3	4	7	6
1948–49	Nelson Maple Leafs	WIHL	36	14	27	41	56	5	1	4	5	6
1949–50	Nelson Maple Leafs	WIHL	—	—	—	—	—	—	—	—	—	—
1950–51	Nelson Maple Leafs	WIHL	22	7	24	31	38	4	0	0	0	0
AHA totals			227	81	152	233	138	19	4	6	10	10
IAHL/AHL totals			318	88	168	256	198	18	2	10	12	4
NHL totals			20	2	4	6	2	—	—	—	—	—
