= John Newman (ice hockey) =

Canadian ice hockey player

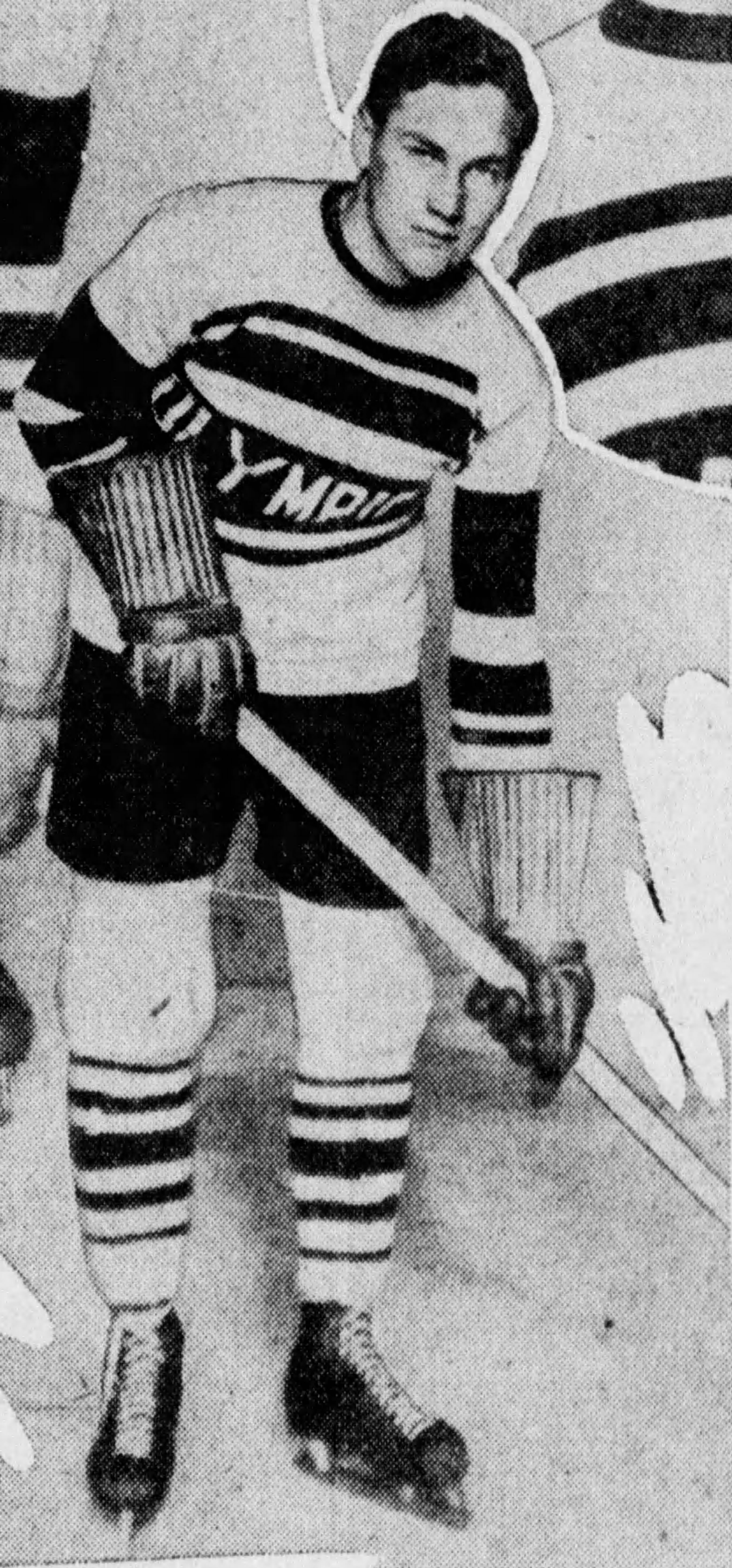
- Born: April 24, 1910 Ottawa, Ontario, Canada
- Died: April 17, 1967 (aged 56) Hollywood, Florida
- Height: 5 ft 8 in (173 cm)
- Weight: 155 lb (70 kg; 11 st 1 lb)
- Position: Centre
- Shot: Left
- Played for: Detroit Falcons
- Playing career: 1929–1940

John Michael Newman (April 24, 1910 – April 17, 1967), commonly known as Johnny Newman, was a Canadian professional ice hockey player from Ottawa. He played 11 years of professional hockey, including eight years in the International Hockey League (IHL) and 9 games with the Detroit Falcons of the National Hockey League (NHL) in 1931.

== Early years ==
Newman was born in 1910 in Ottawa, Ontario, Canada. He played junior hockey for the West End Beavers and was the leading scorer in Ottawa's City Junior Hockey League. After a game in which he scored four goals and added an assist, the Ottawa Citizen in February 1928 described him as "one of the most brilliant performers in junior ranks." He also played at the junior level for Ottawa's City View team where he continued to earn a reputation as one of Ottawa's outstanding junior hockey players.

== Professional hockey ==
=== Detroit Olympics ===
He began his professional hockey career with the Detroit Olympics of the International Hockey League (IHL). He was recruited to Detroit by general manager Jack Adams during an August 1929 visit to Ottawa. He was then called up by the Olympics in November 1929. On November 17, 1929, in the first period of his first game with the Olympics, Newman scored his first professional goal and was described as "a stocky little fellow [who] turned in a great exhibition of hook-checking and stick-handling than Detroit has seen in the minor ranks" since Vic Ripley. In his first season, Newman appeared in 42 games and scored nine goals and added 11 assists.

By the start of his second season, and after "playing the greatest game of his brief career", including "a smartly-executed solo effort" in which he beat the whole Windsor team and scored on a back-hand from "an angle which appeared impossible," he was branded as a "star" by the Detroit Free Press.

=== Detroit Falcons ===
In mid-February 1931, Jack Adams promoted Newman from the Olympics to the Detroit Falcons (later renamed the Detroit Red Wings) of the National Hockey League (NHL). He appeared in nine games with the Falcons, scoring one goal with one assist. He scored his first and only NHL goal "on a pretty backhand shot" in a March 15, 1931, game against the Boston Bruins.

=== Return to minor leagues ===
He was returned to the Olympics after his stint with the Falcons and continued with that club through the 1932–33 season. He scored a career-high 10 goals for the Olympics during the 1931-32 season.

In September 1933, the Red Wings traded Newman and two others Olympic players to the Buffalo Bisons in exchange for star defenseman Gamey Lederman. Newman continued to play several more seasons in the IHL with the Bisons (1933-34, 1934-1937) and Cleveland Falcons (1934-35). He appeared in a career-high 48 games with Buffalo during the 1935-36 season. He also spent part of the 1936-37 season with the Seattle Seahawks of the Pacific Coast Hockey League. He returned to Detroit in 1937, playing for the Detroit Pontiac Chiefs/McLeans of the Michigan-Ontario Hockey League from 1937 to 1940.

Over the course of his 11 years in professional hockey, he scored 82 goals and contributed 85 assists for a total of 167 points.

== Later years ==
Newman was drafted into the United States Army in early 1941. He died in 1967 at age 56 in Hollywood, Florida.

== Career statistics ==
=== Regular season and playoffs ===
			Regular season					Playoffs
Season	Team	League	GP	G	A	Pts	PIM	GP	G	A	Pts	PIM
1928–29	Ottawa Junior Shamrocks	OCHL	—	—	—	—	—	—	—	—	—	—
1929–30	Detroit Olympics	IHL	41	9	11	20	29	2	0	0	0	4
1930–31	Detroit Falcons	NHL	9	1	1	2	2	—	—	—	—	—
1930–31	Detroit Olympics	IHL	21	3	5	8	30	—	—	—	—	—
1931–32	Detroit Olympics	IHL	46	10	8	18	32	6	2	0	2	12
1932–33	Detroit Olympics	IHL	34	7	6	13	25	—	—	—	—	—
1933–34	Buffalo Bisons	IHL	43	5	2	7	16	6	0	2	2	2
1934–35	Cleveland Falcons	IHL	7	3	1	4	0	—	—	—	—	—
1934–35	Buffalo Bisons	IHL	32	4	10	14	4	—	—	—	—	—
1935–36	Buffalo Bisons	IHL	47	5	14	19	10	5	0	2	2	0
1936–37	Buffalo Bisons	IAHL	11	3	2	5	4	—	—	—	—	—
1936–37	Seattle Seahawks	PCHL	26	5	5	10	5	—	—	—	—	—
1937–38	Detroit Pontiac McLeans	MOHL	28	10	12	22	23	3	2	1	3	4
1938–39	Detroit Pontiac McLeans	MOHL	27	9	6	15	4	7	3	2	5	0
1939–40	Detroit Pontiac McLeans	MOHL	23	9	2	11	11	—	—	—	—	—
IHL totals			271	46	57	103	146	19	2	4	6	18
NHL totals			9	1	1	2	2	—	—	—	—	—
