= Maurice Roberts (ice hockey) =

American ice hockey player (1905–1975)

- Born: December 13, 1905 Waterbury, Connecticut, U.S.
- Died: February 7, 1975 (aged 69) Somerville, Massachusetts, U.S.
- Height: 5 ft 9 in (175 cm)
- Weight: 165 lb (75 kg; 11 st 11 lb)
- Position: Goaltender
- Caught: Right
- Played for: Boston Bruins; New York Americans; Chicago Black Hawks
- Playing career: 1925–1946; 1951

Morris "Maurice, Moe" Roberts (December 13, 1905 – February 7, 1975) was an American ice hockey goaltender with the Boston Bruins, New York Americans, and Chicago Black Hawks for periods between 1925 and 1951, spending the rest of his career in different minor leagues. Roberts was the oldest man to play the position of goaltender in National Hockey League history, and in two different stretches of several decades was both the oldest player to play an NHL game and the youngest to play goal in the NHL. Roberts was born in Waterbury, Connecticut, but grew up in Somerville, Massachusetts.

== History ==
Roberts played a total of ten games in the NHL with the Boston Bruins, New York Americans, and Chicago Black Hawks, as well as playing sixteen seasons in the minor leagues, most notably for the Cleveland Barons and the New Haven Eagles. His career was interrupted for four seasons after he enlisted in the United States Navy during World War II. After the war, he played only one more regular season of professional hockey.

Roberts made his NHL debut with the Boston Bruins on December 8, 1925, substituting for injured regular Doc Stewart in a 3-2 win against the Montreal Maroons. At age 19, he was the youngest goaltender in NHL history, until surpassed by Harry Lumley nearly twenty years later.

On November 25, 1951, Roberts, then an assistant trainer with the Black Hawks, had to finish the third period for the injured Lumley, at that point the Black Hawks' starter. Although Roberts didn't yield a goal, his Hawks still fell to the Detroit Red Wings, 5–2. The then 45-year-old Roberts, in his last NHL game, became the oldest player to play in an NHL game; a record he held until broken by Gordie Howe in 1979, and also passed by Chris Chelios. He remains the oldest goaltender to play in an NHL game. He also was the final NHL player who was active in the 1920s.

Roberts was inducted into the United States Hockey Hall of Fame in 2005.

== Career statistics ==
=== Regular season and playoffs ===
			Regular season								Playoffs
Season	Team	League	GP	W	L	T	Min	GA	SO	GAA	GP	W	L	T	Min	GA	SO	GAA
1923–24	Somerville High School	HS-MA	—	—	—	—	—	—	—	—	—	—	—	—	—	—	—	—
1924–25	Boston Athletic Association	USAHA	—	—	—	—	—	—	—	—	1	0	0	0	30	1	0	1.50
1925–26	Boston Bruins	NHL	2	1	1	0	85	5	0	3.53	—	—	—	—	—	—	—	—
1926–27	New Haven Eagles	Can-Am	32	18	14	0	1980	66	1	2.00	4	1	2	1	240	9	0	2.25
1927–28	New Haven Eagles	Can-Am	40	16	20	4	2450	90	4	2.20	—	—	—	—	—	—	—	—
1928–29	Philadelphia Arrows	Can-Am	40	12	21	7	2490	73	5	1.76	—	—	—	—	—	—	—	—
1929–30	Philadelphia Arrows	Can-Am	40	20	18	2	2470	121	3	2.94	1	—	—	—	120	5	0	2.50
1930–31	Philadelphia Arrows	Can-Am	40	12	22	6	2460	108	3	2.63	—	—	—	—	—	—	—	—
1931–32	New York Americans	NHL	1	1	0	0	60	1	0	1.00	—	—	—	—	—	—	—	—
1931–32	New Haven Eagles	Can-Am	22	12	10	0	1370	48	2	2.10	2	0	2	0	120	8	0	4.00
1932–33	New Haven Eagles	Can-Am	44	16	23	5	2680	123	4	2.75	—	—	—	—	—	—	—	—
1933–34	New York Americans	NHL	6	1	4	0	336	25	0	4.46	—	—	—	—	—	—	—	—
1933–34	Cleveland Indians	IHL	35	—	—	—	2100	98	3	2.80	—	—	—	—	—	—	—	—
1934–35	Cleveland Falcons	IHL	44	20	23	1	2670	132	4	2.97	2	0	2	0	140	6	0	2.57
1935–36	Cleveland Falcons	IHL	13	8	3	2	810	28	2	2.07	2	1	1	0	120	3	1	1.50
1935–36	Syracuse Stars	IHL	1	1	0	0	60	0	1	0.00	—	—	—	—	—	—	—	—
1935–36	Rochester Cardinals	IHL	15	8	5	2	930	31	2	2.00	—	—	—	—	—	—	—	—
1936–37	Cleveland Falcons	IAHL	45	13	24	8	2840	134	3	2.83	—	—	—	—	—	—	—	—
1937–38	Cleveland Barons	IAHL	45	24	11	9	2810	103	5	2.20	2	0	2	0	183	9	0	2.95
1938–39	Cleveland Barons	IAHL	54	23	22	9	3410	138	4	2.43	9	7	2	0	635	12	4	1.13
1939–40	Cleveland Barons	IAHL	56	24	24	8	3482	130	5	2.24	—	—	—	—	—	—	—	—
1940–41	Cleveland Barons	AHL	43	20	15	7	2640	122	3	2.77	4	2	1	0	239	10	0	2.51
1941–42	Cleveland Barons	AHL	27	17	7	2	1560	79	2	3.04	—	—	—	—	—	—	—	—
1941–42	Pittsburgh Hornets	AHL	3	1	2	0	180	14	0	4.67	—	—	—	—	—	—	—	—
1945–46	Washington Lions	EAHL	24	—	—	—	1440	97	2	4.04	6	—	—	—	360	22	1	3.67
1951–52	Chicago Black Hawks	NHL	1	0	0	0	20	0	0	0.00	—	—	—	—	—	—	—	—
NHL totals			10	3	5	0	501	31	0	3.71	—	—	—	—	—	—	—	—

== See also ==
- List of oldest National Hockey League players
