= Earl Roche =

Canadian ice hockey player

- Born: February 22, 1910 Prescott, Ontario, Canada
- Died: August 15, 1965 (aged 55)
- Height: 5 ft 11 in (180 cm)
- Weight: 174 lb (79 kg; 12 st 6 lb)
- Position: Left wing
- Shot: Left
- Played for: NHL; Montreal Maroons; Boston Bruins; Ottawa Senators; St. Louis Eagles; Detroit Red Wings; IHL; Buffalo Bisons; Detroit Olympics; Pittsburgh Shamrocks; Cleveland Falcons; Windsor Bulldogs; AHL; New Haven Eagles; Hershey Bears; Providence Reds
- Playing career: 1930–1942

Earl Joseph Roche (February 22, 1910 – August 15, 1965) was a Canadian ice hockey left winger. He played 147 games over five seasons in the National Hockey League (NHL) for the Montreal Maroons, Boston Bruins, Ottawa Senators, St. Louis Eagles and Detroit Red Wings. His brother Desse Roche also played in the NHL. The brothers often played on the same line; Earl at left wing and Desse on right wing.

== Playing career ==
Roche was born in Prescott, Ontario, but moved to Montreal where he played junior hockey for the Montreal Victorias and other teams. He moved up to senior hockey for the Montreal Hockey Club and played for their Allan Cup-winning squad of 1930. He signed with the Maroons of the NHL, playing for the Maroons and the Windsor Bulldogs until 1933. He was released by the Maroons and signed with the Bruins in January 1933 only to be traded to the Senators one month later. In his one full season with the Senators in 1933–34 he showed a scoring touch, scoring 13 goals and 16 assists in 45 games. The next season, the Senators relocated to St. Louis to become the Eagles. Roche was traded twice in 1934–35; from St. Louis to Buffalo, then to the Red Wings. That marked his last season in the NHL, as he subsequently played for various minor-league pro teams until 1942.

== Career statistics ==
=== Regular season and playoffs ===
			Regular season					Playoffs
Season	Team	League	GP	G	A	Pts	PIM	GP	G	A	Pts	PIM
1925–26	Montreal Victorias	MCJHL	5	1	1	2	2	—	—	—	—	—
1926–27	Montreal Bell Telephone	MRTHL	—	—	—	—	—	—	—	—	—	—
1927–28	Montreal Bell Telephone	MRTHL	—	—	—	—	—	—	—	—	—	—
1927–28	Montreal St. Anthony's	MRTHL	—	—	—	—	—	—	—	—	—	—
1928–29	Montreal Victorias	MCJHL	—	—	—	—	—	—	—	—	—	—
1928–29	Montreal Bell Telephone	MRTHL	15	10	4	14	24	—	—	—	—	—
1928–29	Montreal Martins	MMRHL	—	2	0	2	2	—	—	—	—	—
1929–30	Montreal Bell Telephone	MRTHL	10	6	0	6	18	2	1	1	2	6
1930–31	Montreal Maroons	NHL	42	2	0	2	18	2	0	0	0	0
1931–32	Windsor Bulldogs	IHL	48	22	18	40	51	6	0	1	1	2
1932–33	Montreal Maroons	NHL	5	0	0	0	0	—	—	—	—	—
1932–33	Windsor Bulldogs	IHL	17	6	8	14	23	—	—	—	—	—
1932–33	Boston Bruins	NHL	3	0	0	0	0	—	—	—	—	—
1932–33	Ottawa Senators	NHL	20	4	5	9	6	—	—	—	—	—
1933–34	Ottawa Senators	NHL	45	13	16	29	22	—	—	—	—	—
1933–34	Detroit Olympics	IHL	5	0	0	0	2	—	—	—	—	—
1934–35	St. Louis Eagles	NHL	19	3	3	6	2	—	—	—	—	—
1934–35	Buffalo Bisons	IHL	1	1	1	2	0	—	—	—	—	—
1934–35	Detroit Red Wings	NHL	13	3	3	6	0	—	—	—	—	—
1934–35	Detroit Olympics	IHL	7	2	1	3	12	5	1	4	5	0
1935–36	Pittsburgh Shamrocks	IHL	28	12	11	33	30	—	—	—	—	—
1935–36	Cleveland Falcons	IHL	19	9	8	17	26	2	0	0	0	0
1936–37	Cleveland Falcons	IAHL	39	11	17	28	49	—	—	—	—	—
1937–38	Cleveland Barons	IAHL	46	4	9	13	12	1	0	2	2	2
1938–39	Providence Reds	IAHL	1	0	0	0	0	—	—	—	—	—
1938–39	Cleveland Barons	IAHL	9	0	4	4	0	—	—	—	—	—
1938–39	Hershey Bears	IAHL	42	4	9	13	14	5	0	3	3	0
1939–40	New Haven Eagles	IAHL	54	13	28	41	14	3	0	3	3	0
1940–41	New Haven Eagles	AHL	51	18	17	35	22	2	0	0	0	2
1941–42	New Haven Eagles	AHL	56	9	20	29	19	2	0	0	0	2
1943–44	Montreal Noordyn	MCHL	10	5	5	10	6	—	—	—	—	—
NHL totals			147	25	27	52	48	2	0	0	0	0
