= Des Roche =

Canadian ice hockey player

- Born: February 1, 1909; Kemptville, Ontario, Canada
- Died: January 18, 1971 (aged 61)
- Height: 5 ft 6 in (168 cm)
- Weight: 156 lb (71 kg; 11 st 2 lb)
- Position: Right Wing
- Shot: Right
- Played for: St. Louis Eagles; Montreal Canadiens; Montreal Maroons; Ottawa Senators; Detroit Red Wings
- Playing career: 1930–1939

Desmond Michael Patrick "Desse" Roche (February 1, 1909 – January 18, 1971) was a Canadian ice hockey player. He played four seasons in the National Hockey League for the Maroons, Senators, Eagles, Canadiens and Red Wings. He was one of only six NHL players to have worn the number 99. His brother Earl Roche also played in the National Hockey League. Roche scored the final goal of the original Ottawa Senators franchise on March 17, 1934, to tie the Maroons 2–2 in Montreal.

== Playing career ==
Born in Kemptville, Ontario, Roche moved to Montreal, Quebec as a youth. He played junior for the Montreal Victorias, and played for other teams in the local railway league. In 1929, he joined the Montreal Hockey Club, and, with his brother Earl, the team won the Allan Cup. He signed in the fall of 1930 with the Maroons, playing with the Maroons and the minor-league Windsor Bulldogs until 1933, when he was traded to the Senators for Wally Kilrea. At the same time, the Senators acquired his brother Earl, and the two played with the Senators NHL franchise until 1934 when it relocated to St. Louis to become the Eagles. Playing with his brother, Roche had his best season in 1933–34, scoring 14 goals and adding 10 assists in 46 games. He was traded to Boston in December 1934 by the Eagles; he was then traded by the Bruins to the Canadiens four days later. That season, 1934–35, Roche played for six pro teams: the three in the NHL and three minor-league teams. He did not play in the NHL again; he continued in the minor leagues until 1939.

== Career statistics ==
=== Regular season and playoffs ===
			Regular season					Playoffs
Season	Team	League	GP	G	A	Pts	PIM	GP	G	A	Pts	PIM
1925–26	Montreal Victorias	MCJHL	6	4	1	5	2	4	3	1	4	2
1926–27	Montreal Victorias	MCHL	1	0	0	0	0	—	—	—	—	—
1927–28	Montreal Bell Telephone	MRTHL	—	—	—	—	—	—	—	—	—	—
1927–28	Montreal St. Anthony's	MRTHL	13	7	0	7	—	—	—	—	—	—
1928–29	Montreal Bell Telephone	MRTHL	—	5	4	9	20	—	—	—	—	—
1928–29	Montreal Martins	MRTHL	—	7	0	7	—	—	—	—	—	—
1929–30	Montreal Bell Telephone	MRTHL	10	6	0	6	8	2	1	0	1	2
1930–31	Montreal Maroons	NHL	19	0	1	1	6	—	—	—	—	—
1930–31	Windsor Bulldogs	IHL	26	10	2	12	16	6	1	0	1	2
1931–32	Windsor Bulldogs	IHL	42	11	12	23	42	6	2	0	2	6
1932–33	Montreal Maroons	NHL	5	0	0	0	0	—	—	—	—	—
1932–33	Windsor Bulldogs	IHL	20	7	4	11	32	—	—	—	—	—
1932–33	Ottawa Senators	NHL	16	3	6	9	6	—	—	—	—	—
1933–34	Ottawa Senators	NHL	46	14	10	24	22	—	—	—	—	—
1934–35	St. Louis Eagles	NHL	7	0	0	0	0	—	—	—	—	—
1934–35	Montreal Canadiens	NHL	5	0	1	1	0	—	—	—	—	—
1934–35	Buffalo Bisons	IHL	1	1	1	2	2	—	—	—	—	—
1934–35	Detroit Red Wings	NHL	15	3	0	3	10	—	—	—	—	—
1934–35	Detroit Olympics	IHL	7	0	3	3	6	5	6	2	8	4
1934–35	London Tecumsehs	IHL	3	0	0	0	4	—	—	—	—	—
1935–36	Pittsburgh Shamrocks	IHL	25	7	7	14	26	—	—	—	—	—
1935–36	Cleveland Falcons	IHL	19	3	5	8	10	2	0	0	0	0
1936–37	St. Louis Flyers	AHA	4	3	0	3	2	—	—	—	—	—
1937–38	Tulsa Oilers	AHA	32	12	9	21	27	—	—	—	—	—
1938–39	Spokane Clippers	PCHL	45	14	11	25	33	—	—	—	—	—
NHL totals			113	20	18	38	44	—	—	—	—	—
