= Bill Touhey =

Canadian ice hockey player

- Born: March 23, 1906; Ottawa, Ontario, Canada
- Died: March 28, 1999 (aged 93); Ottawa, Ontario, Canada
- Height: 5 ft 9 in (175 cm)
- Weight: 155 lb (70 kg; 11 st 1 lb)
- Position: Left wing
- Shot: Left
- Played for: Montreal Maroons; Ottawa Senators; Boston Bruins
- Playing career: 1926–1937

William James Touhey (March 23, 1906 — March 28, 1999) was a Canadian ice hockey player who played 280 games in the National Hockey League with the Montreal Maroons, Ottawa Senators, and Boston Bruins between 1927 and 1934.

== Playing career ==
Bill broke into the league with the Montreal Maroons in the 1927–28 season. Following the season, he was traded to the Ottawa Senators. He played three seasons, then was loaned to Boston for the 1931–32 while the Senators were suspended. After the Senators were revived in 1932–33, he played two further seasons for the team, before leaving the NHL to play in the minors, starting in the 1934–35 season. He finished with 65 goals and 40 assists for 105 points in 280 NHL games.

After the NHL, he played three seasons with minor teams in the States before returning to the Ottawa Senators senior amateur team, where he finished his playing days in 1939–40.

When he died in 1999 he was the third last surviving member of the original Ottawa Senators of the NHL. William Hollett survived one month longer, and Teddy Saunders died in 2002.

== Career statistics ==
=== Regular season and playoffs ===
			Regular season					Playoffs
Season	Team	League	GP	G	A	Pts	PIM	GP	G	A	Pts	PIM
1920–21	Ottawa St. Brigid	OCHL	—	—	—	—	—	—	—	—	—	—
1921–22	Ottawa St. Brigid	OCHL	2	0	0	0	0	—	—	—	—	—
1922–23	Ottawa St. Pats	OCHL	—	—	—	—	—	—	—	—	—	—
1923–24	Ottawa Collegiate	OCHL	—	—	—	—	—	—	—	—	—	—
1924–25	Ottawa Gunners	OCHL	16	15	3	18	—	—	—	—	—	—
1925–26	Montreal CNR	MRTHL	3	0	0	0	2	1	0	0	0	)
1925–26	Ottawa Montagnards	OCHL	15	7	5	12	—	5	1	0	1	—
1926–27	Stratford Nationals	Can-Pro	30	19	10	29	18	2	0	0	0	6
1927–28	Montreal Maroons	NHL	29	2	0	2	2	—	—	—	—	—
1927–28	Stratford Nationals	Can-Pro	11	2	3	5	15	5	4	1	5	4
1928–29	Ottawa Senators	NHL	44	9	3	12	28	—	—	—	—	—
1929–30	Ottawa Senators	NHL	44	10	3	13	24	2	1	0	1	0
1930–31	Ottawa Senators	NHL	44	15	15	30	8	—	—	—	—	—
1931–32	Boston Bruins	NHL	26	5	2	7	14	—	—	—	—	—
1931–32	Boston Cubs	Can-Am	5	1	0	1	2	—	—	—	—	—
1931–32	Philadelphia Arrows	Can-Am	11	1	5	6	4	—	—	—	—	—
1932–33	Ottawa Senators	NHL	47	12	7	19	12	—	—	—	—	—
1933–34	Ottawa Senators	NHL	46	12	8	20	21	—	—	—	—	—
1934–35	Windsor Bulldogs	IHL	25	4	14	18	0	—	—	—	—	—
1934–35	Syracuse Stars	IHL	12	1	2	3	2	—	—	—	—	—
1935–36	Buffalo Bisons	IHL	40	15	15	30	8	5	0	0	0	0
1936–37	Buffalo Bisons	IAHL	10	0	0	0	0	—	—	—	—	—
1937–38	Ottawa Senators	QSHL	21	8	12	20	2	2	1	1	2	0
1938–39	Ottawa Senators	QSHL	22	11	11	22	6	6	2	4	6	2
1939–40	Ottawa Senators	QSHL	30	9	18	27	4	—	—	—	—	—
NHL totals			280	65	38	103	109	2	1	0	1	0
