= Wilfie Starr =

Canadian ice hockey player (1908–1976)

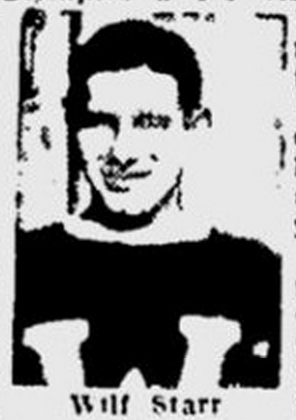
- Born: July 22, 1908 Saint Boniface, Manitoba, Canada
- Died: May 1, 1976 (aged 67) Winnipeg, Manitoba, Canada
- Height: 5 ft 11 in (180 cm)
- Weight: 190 lb (86 kg; 13 st 8 lb)
- Position: Centre
- Shot: Left
- Played for: Detroit Red Wings; New York Americans
- Playing career: 1930–1940

Wilfrid Peter McKillop "Wilfie" Starr (July 22, 1908 – May 1, 1976) was a Canadian professional ice hockey forward who played 87 games in the National Hockey League for the Detroit Red Wings and New York Americans between 1932 and 1936. Starr was included on Detroit's 1936 team picture, but left off the cup. He spent most of the season in minors, and did not play in NHL during the playoffs. He was born in St. Boniface, Manitoba to Samuel and Jessie Starr. He was married to Dorothy Kathleen McBride in 1931. He died suddenly at a Winnipeg hospital in 1976.

== Career statistics ==
=== Regular season and playoffs ===
			Regular season					Playoffs
Season	Team	League	GP	G	A	Pts	PIM	GP	G	A	Pts	PIM
1927–28	Winnipeg CPR	WSrHL	3	2	0	2	8	—	—	—	—	—
1927–28	Winnipeg Columbus	WJrHL	3	2	2	4	—	2	2	0	2	2
1928–29	Winnipeg CRP	WSrHL	7	6	1	7	14	3	0	0	0	0
1928–29	University of Manitoba	WSrHL	6	6	4	10	12	2	0	0	0	2
1929–30	Winnipeg HC	WSrHL	12	7	5	12	10	2	0	0	0	0
1930–31	Springfield Indians	Can-Am	25	8	4	12	35	7	0	0	0	16
1931–32	Springfield Indians	Can-Am	38	19	11	30	38	—	—	—	—	—
1932–33	Springfield Indians	Can-Am	8	1	0	1	4	—	—	—	—	—
1932–33	New York Americans	NHL	26	4	3	7	8	—	—	—	—	—
1933–34	Detroit Red Wings	ANHL	28	2	2	4	17	7	0	2	2	2
1933–34	Detroit Olympics	IHL	19	8	2	10	22	—	—	—	—	—
1934–35	Detroit Red Wings	NHL	24	2	2	4	0	—	—	—	—	—
1934–35	Detroit Olympics	IHL	18	8	9	17	21	—	—	—	—	—
1934–35	Windsor Bulldogs	IHL	1	0	0	0	0	—	—	—	—	—
1935–36	Detroit Red Wings	NHL	9	1	0	1	0	—	—	—	—	—
1935–36	Detroit Olympics	IHL	24	5	13	18	38	6	6	6	12	22
1936–37	Pittsburgh Hornets	IAHL	48	5	21	26	87	5	0	2	2	10
1937–38	Providence Reds	IAHL	31	5	13	18	28	7	3	4	7	4
1938–39	Providence Reds	IAHL	50	16	33	49	61	5	0	3	3	15
1939–40	Providence Reds	IAHL	53	15	26	41	71	8	2	5	7	2
IAHL totals			182	41	93	134	247	25	5	14	19	31
NHL totals			87	9	7	16	25	7	0	2	2	2

== Awards and achievements ==
- IAHL Championship (1936)
