= Frank Daley =

Canadian ice hockey player

- Born: August 28, 1908; Port Arthur, Ontario, Canada
- Died: October 15, 1968 (aged 60); Encinitas, California, USA
- Height: 5 ft 11 in (180 cm)
- Weight: 178 lb (81 kg; 12 st 10 lb)
- Position: Left wing/Centre
- Shot: Left
- Played for: Detroit Cougars
- Playing career: 1928–1945

Francis Patrick Denis "Dapper Dan" Daley (August 28, 1908 - October 15, 1968) was a Canadian ice hockey player. In his career, which lasted from 1928 to 1945, he mainly played in various minor leagues, but also played 5 regular season and 2 playoff games for the Detroit Cougars of the National Hockey League in the 1928–29 season.

== Career statistics ==
=== Regular season and playoffs ===
			Regular season					Playoffs
Season	Team	League	GP	G	A	Pts	PIM	GP	G	A	Pts	PIM
1926–27	Fort William Forts	TBJHL	—	—	—	—	—	—	—	—	—	—
1927–28	Fort William Forts	TBSHL	1	0	0	0	2	—	—	—	—	—
1928–29	Houghton Cougars	NMHL	—	—	—	—	—	—	—	—	—	—
1928–29	Detroit Cougars	NHL	5	0	0	0	0	2	0	0	0	0
1929–30	Detroit Olympics	IHL	30	1	0	1	19	2	0	0	0	0
1930–31	Detroit Olympics	IHL	47	4	8	12	52	—	—	—	—	—
1931–32	Cleveland Indians	IHL	44	2	3	5	54	—	—	—	—	—
1932–33	Cleveland Indians	IHL	39	14	8	22	45	—	—	—	—	—
1933–34	Windsor Bulldogs	IHL	—	—	—	—	—	—	—	—	—	—
1933–34	London Tecumsehs	IHL	42	9	9	18	30	6	2	5	7	2
1934–35	Cleveland Falcons	IHL	43	16	25	41	44	2	0	0	0	0
1935–36	Cleveland Falcons	IHL	48	17	36	53	45	2	0	0	0	2
1936–27	Cleveland Barons	IAHL	17	3	4	7	11	—	—	—	—	—
1936–37	Springfield Indians	IAHL	16	3	4	7	4	4	0	1	1	0
1937–38	St. Louis Flyers	AHA	25	6	6	12	10	—	—	—	—	—
1937–38	Seattle Seahawks	PCHL	18	5	7	12	10	4	0	0	0	0
1938–39	Seattle Seahawks	PCHL	47	15	25	40	32	7	2	2	4	12
1939–40	Seattle Seahawks	PCHL	40	26	14	40	20	—	—	—	—	—
1940–41	Seattle Olympics	PCHL	47	28	31	59	32	2	0	0	0	0
1941–42	Philadelphia Ramblers	AHL	56	16	35	51	12	—	—	—	—	—
1942–43	Hershey Bears	AHL	56	15	33	48	31	6	0	2	2	2
1943–44	Seattle Ironmen	PCHL	5	11	6	17	18	—	—	—	—	—
1943–44	Hershey Bears	AHL	41	3	12	15	14	3	0	0	0	0
1944–45	Seattle Stars	PCHL	—	—	—	—	—	—	—	—	—	—
IHL totals			293	63	89	152	289	12	2	5	7	4
NHL totals			5	0	0	0	0	2	0	0	0	0
