= Roger Cormier =

Canadian ice hockey player

- Born: March 23, 1905 Montreal, Quebec, Canada
- Died: February 9, 1971 (aged 65)
- Height: 5 ft 10 in (178 cm)
- Weight: 167 lb (76 kg; 11 st 13 lb)
- Position: Right wing
- Shot: Right
- Played for: Montreal Canadiens
- Playing career: 1924–1940

Joseph Arthur Roger Cormier (March 23, 1905 – February 9, 1971) was a Canadian professional ice hockey right winger. He played one game in the National Hockey League for the Montreal Canadiens during the 1925–26 season, on January 16, 1926 against the Montreal Maroons. The rest of his career, which lasted from 1924 to 1940, was spent in the minor leagues.

== Career statistics ==
=== Regular season and playoffs ===
			Regular season					Playoffs
Season	Team	League	GP	G	A	Pts	PIM	GP	G	A	Pts	PIM
1924–25	Montreal St. Francis Xavier	MCHL	—	—	—	—	—	—	—	—	—	—
1925–26	Montreal Canadiens	NHL	1	0	0	0	0	—	—	—	—	—
1925–26	Montreal Nationale	MCHL	9	4	3	7	6	—	—	—	—	—
1925–26	Montreal St. Francis Xavier	MCHL	—	—	—	—	—	—	—	—	—	—
1926–27	Providence Reds	Can-Am	32	6	2	8	47	—	—	—	—	—
1927–28	Providence Reds	Can-Am	39	7	2	9	32	—	—	—	—	—
1928–29	Providence Reds	Can-Am	29	1	1	2	29	—	—	—	—	—
1928–29	Kitchener Flying Dutchmen	Can-Pro	11	4	0	4	14	—	—	—	—	—
1929–30	Providence Reds	Can-Am	39	9	4	13	54	—	—	—	—	—
1930–31	Providence Reds	Can-Am	39	11	14	25	51	—	—	—	—	—
1931–32	Providence Reds	Can-Am	40	6	8	14	50	5	0	0	0	6
1932–33	Windsor Bulldogs	IHL	44	8	12	20	79	—	—	—	—	—
1933–34	Cleveland Indians	IHL	44	10	9	19	28	—	—	—	—	—
1934–35	Cleveland Falcons	IHL	44	17	16	33	52	—	—	—	—	—
1935–36	Cleveland Falcons	IHL	8	1	2	3	4	—	—	—	—	—
1935–36	Pittsburgh Shamrocks	IHL	3	0	0	0	2	—	—	—	—	—
1935–36	Rochester Cardinals	IHL	30	7	3	10	17	—	—	—	—	—
1936–37	Sherbrooke Red Raiders	QPHL	20	6	2	8	9	1	0	0	0	0
1937–38	Sherbrooke Red Raiders	QPHL	21	12	8	20	15	9	4	4	8	2
1938–39	Sherbrooke Red Raiders	QPHL	37	12	16	28	41	4	2	1	3	4
1939–40	Sherbrooke Red Raiders	QPHL	40	2	3	5	4	10	0	1	1	2
1939–40	Sherbrooke Red Raiders	Al-Cup	—	—	—	—	—	2	0	1	1	2
Can-Am totals			216	40	31	71	261	10	2	2	4	8
NHL totals			1	0	0	0	0	—	—	—	—	—

== See also ==
- List of players who played only one game in the NHL
