= Alex Wood (ice hockey) =

Scottish ice hockey player (1909–1979)

- Born: January 10, 1909 Falkirk, Scotland, GBR
- Died: April 4, 1979 (aged 70) Fort Wayne, Indiana, USA
- Height: 5 ft 11 in (180 cm)
- Weight: 165 lb (75 kg; 11 st 11 lb)
- Position: Goaltender
- Caught: Left
- Played for: New York Americans
- Playing career: 1930–1945

Alexander Mann Jerome Wood (January 10, 1909 – April 4, 1979) was a professional ice hockey goaltender who played in one National Hockey League game for the New York Americans during the 1936–37 season, on January 31, 1937 against the Montreal Canadiens. The rest of his career, which lasted from 1930 to 1945, was spent in various minor leagues. Wood was born in Falkirk, Scotland, but grew up in Regina, Saskatchewan.

== Career statistics ==
=== Regular season and playoffs ===
			Regular season								Playoffs
Season	Team	League	GP	W	L	T	Min	GA	SO	GAA	GP	W	L	T	Min	GA	SO	GAA
1928–29	Regina Pats	SJHL	6	6	0	0	310	8	2	1.55	—	—	—	—	—	—	—	—
1928–29	Regina Pats	M-Cup	—	—	—	—	—	—	—	—	6	3	1	2	360	14	0	2.33
1929–30	Ottawa Edinburghs	OCHL	3	1	2	0	180	9	0	3.00	—	—	—	—	—	—	—	—
1929–30	Regina Junior Aces	SJHL	18	15	1	2	1190	21	6	1.06	2	0	2	0	120	4	0	2.00
1930–31	Cleveland Indians	IHL	19	12	4	3	1120	44	1	2.36	2	2	0	—	130	6	0	2.77
1931–32	Cleveland Indians	IHL	30	12	13	5	1870	76	0	2.44	—	—	—	—	—	—	—	—
1932–33	Boston Cubs	Can-Am	3	0	2	1	190	14	0	4.67	—	—	—	—	—	—	—	—
1932–33	Quebec Castors	Can-Am	1	0	1	0	60	8	0	8.00	—	—	—	—	—	—	—	—
1933–34	Philadelphia Arrows	Can-Am	41	18	16	7	2540	101	2	2.39	2	0	2	0	120	6	0	3.00
1934–35	Philadelphia Arrows	Can-Am	13	4	7	2	800	40	2	3.00	—	—	—	—	—	—	—	—
1934–35	Providence Reds	Can-Am	3	0	2	1	190	13	0	4.11	—	—	—	—	—	—	—	—
1935–36	Rochester Cardinals	IHL	4	0	4	0	240	14	0	3.50	—	—	—	—	—	—	—	—
1935–36	Buffalo Bisons	IHL	48	22	20	6	2990	101	13	2.04	5	1	4	0	310	7	1	1.36
1936–37	New York Americans	NHL	1	0	1	0	70	3	0	2.57	—	—	—	—	—	—	—	—
1936–37	Buffalo Bisons	IAHL	11	3	8	0	660	30	1	2.73	—	—	—	—	—	—	—	—
1936–37	Cleveland Falcons	IAHL	3	0	3	0	180	18	0	6.00	—	—	—	—	—	—	—	—
1936–37	New Haven Eagles	IAHL	20	5	14	1	1210	70	0	3.47	—	—	—	—	—	—	—	—
1937–38	Minneapolis Millers	AHA	48	24	15	9	3065	100	9	1.96	7	3	4	—	425	9	1	1.27
1938–39	Minneapolis Millers	AHA	48	31	17	0	2977	139	4	2.81	4	2	2	—	255	8	1	1.88
1939–40	Minneapolis Millers	AHA	48	26	22	0	2931	140	3	2.87	3	0	3	—	180	14	0	4.67
1940–41	St. Louis Flyers	AHA	47	31	16	0	2905	98	7	2.02	7	6	1	—	474	14	1	1.77
1941–42	St. Louis Flyers	AHA	50	30	15	5	3060	103	11	2.02	3	0	3	—	180	11	0	3.67
1942–43	New Haven Eagles	AHL	21	5	11	5	1260	77	0	3.67	—	—	—	—	—	—	—	—
1942–43	Hull Volants	OCHL	4	—	—	—	240	24	0	6.00	4	—	—	—	240	19	0	4.75
1943–44	Hull Volants	OCHL	14	7	6	1	840	58	0	4.14	8	6	2	—	480	29	1	3.63
1944–45	Hull Volants	OCHL	24	5	18	1	1440	176	0	7.33	2	—	—	—	120	8	0	4.00
NHL totals			1	0	1	0	70	3	0	2.57	—	—	—	—	—	—	—	—

== See also ==
- List of players who played only one game in the NHL
- List of National Hockey League players from the United Kingdom
