= Patsy Callighen =

Canadian ice hockey player

- Born: February 13, 1906; Toronto, Ontario, Canada
- Died: October 16, 1964 (aged 58)
- Height: 5 ft 6 in (168 cm)
- Weight: 175 lb (79 kg; 12 st 7 lb)
- Position: Defence
- Shot: Left
- Played for: New York Rangers
- Playing career: 1926–1936

Francis Charles Winslow "Patsy" Callighen (February 13, 1906 – October 16, 1964) was a Canadian professional ice hockey player who played 36 regular season and nine playoff games in the National Hockey League with the New York Rangers during the 1927–28 season, winning the Stanley Cup with the team that year. The rest of his career, which lasted from 1926 to 1936, was spent in the minor leagues. Callighen was born in Toronto, Ontario in 1906 and died in 1964.

== Career statistics ==
=== Regular season and playoffs ===
			Regular season					Playoffs
Season	Team	League	GP	G	A	Pts	PIM	GP	G	A	Pts	PIM
1922–23	Toronto St. Andrews	OHA	7	5	5	10	—	—	—	—	—	—
1923–24	Toronto St. Mary's	OHA	8	2	4	6	0	—	—	—	—	—
1923–24	Toronto St. Mary's	M-Cup	—	—	—	—	—	2	2	0	2	0
1924–25	Owen Sound Greys	OHA	17	6	7	13	—	—	—	—	—	—
1924–25	Owen Sound Greys	M-Cup	—	—	—	—	—	9	4	4	8	23
1925–26	Owen Sound Greys	OHA	11	9	4	13	—	—	—	—	—	—
1925–26	Owen Sound Greys	M-Cup	—	—	—	—	—	6	0	0	0	27
1926–27	Springfield Indians	Can-Am	31	5	2	7	83	6	0	0	0	27
1927–28	New York Rangers	NHL	36	0	0	0	32	9	0	0	0	0
1927–28	Springfield Indians	Can-Am	7	1	1	2	20	—	—	—	—	—
1928–29	Springfield Indians	Can-Am	39	2	2	4	124	—	—	—	—	—
1929–30	Springfield Indians	Can-Am	37	10	6	16	63	—	—	—	—	—
1930–31	Springfield Indians	Can-Am	38	14	8	22	108	7	3	1	4	16
1931–32	Springfield Indians	Can-Am	40	1	5	6	74	—	—	—	—	—
1932–33	Quebec Castors	Can-Am	43	3	4	7	52	—	—	—	—	—
1933–34	Cleveland Indians	IHL	43	5	12	17	92	—	—	—	—	—
1934–35	Cleveland Indians	IHL	44	3	4	7	67	2	1	0	1	2
1935–36	Cleveland Indians	IHL	5	0	0	0	11	—	—	—	—	—
1935–36	Rochester Cardinals	IHL	13	2	1	3	8	—	—	—	—	—
1935–36	London Tecumsehs	IHL	28	0	5	5	51	2	0	1	1	2
Can-Am totals			235	36	28	64	524	13	3	1	4	43
NHL totals			36	0	0	0	32	9	0	0	0	0
