= Sammy Godin =

Canadian ice hockey player

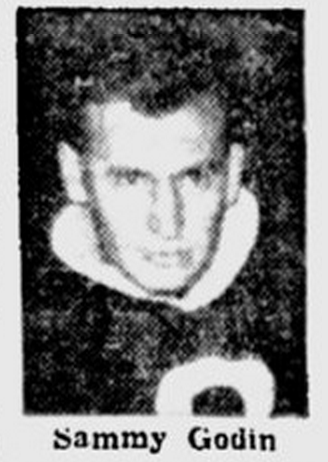
- Born: September 20, 1907; Rockland, Ontario, Canada
- Died: March 8, 1975 (aged 67) near Ottawa, Ontario, Canada
- Height: 5 ft 10 in (178 cm)
- Weight: 156 lb (71 kg; 11 st 2 lb)
- Position: Right wing
- Shot: Right
- Played for: Ottawa Senators; Montreal Canadiens
- Playing career: 1926–1943

Joseph Samuel Ozomer Godin (September 20, 1907 – March 8, 1975) was a Canadian professional ice hockey player. He played 79 games in the National Hockey League with the Ottawa Senators and Montreal Canadiens from 1927 to 1934. The rest of his career, which lasted from 1926 to 1943, was spent in the minor leagues. He was born in Rockland, Ontario. He died in 1975.

== Career statistics ==
=== Regular season and playoffs ===
			Regular season					Playoffs
Season	Team	League	GP	G	A	Pts	PIM	GP	G	A	Pts	PIM
1926–27	Rockland Hockey Club	OVHL	—	—	—	—	—	—	—	—	—	—
1927–28	Ottawa Senators	NHL	20	0	0	0	0	2	0	0	0	0
1927–28	Rockland Hockey Club	OVHL	8	8	2	10	6	—	—	—	—	—
1928–29	Ottawa Senators	NHL	23	2	1	3	19	—	—	—	—	—
1928–29	Niagara Falls Catracts	Can-Pro	18	8	1	9	33	—	—	—	—	—
1929–30	Buffalo Bisons	IHL	39	9	6	15	22	7	0	0	0	8
1930–31	Buffalo Bisons	IHL	26	3	5	8	16	6	0	0	0	2
1931–32	Buffalo Bisons	IHL	47	5	5	10	21	5	0	0	0	2
1932–33	Buffalo Bisons	IHL	42	15	12	27	45	6	4	0	4	8
1933–34	Montreal Canadiens	NHL	36	2	2	4	15	—	—	—	—	—
1933–34	Windsor Bulldogs	IHL	9	0	0	0	2	—	—	—	—	—
1934–35	Buffalo Bisons	IHL	17	2	3	5	16	—	—	—	—	—
1934–35	London Tecumsehs	IHL	27	11	7	18	24	5	0	2	2	2
1935–36	Buffalo Bisons	IHL	48	19	18	37	14	5	2	1	3	0
1936–37	Buffalo Bisons	IAHL	11	1	2	3	4	—	—	—	—	—
1936–37	Vancouver Lions	PCHL	31	8	7	15	14	3	1	2	3	0
1937–38	Springfield Indians	IAHL	3	0	1	1	2	—	—	—	—	—
1937–38	Minneapolis Millers	AHA	44	24	17	41	19	7	5	1	6	0
1938–39	Minneapolis Millers	AHA	9	2	4	6	4	—	—	—	—	—
1938–39	Kansas City Greyhounds	AHA	29	6	12	18	10	—	—	—	—	—
1939–40	Wichita Skyhawks	AHA	15	1	4	5	10	—	—	—	—	—
1940–41	Ottawa Canadiens	OCHL	8	1	1	2	2	—	—	—	—	—
1941–42	Ottawa Canadiens	OCHL	—	—	—	—	—	—	—	—	—	—
1942–43	Hamilton Majors	OHA Sr	1	0	0	0	0	—	—	—	—	—
IHL totals			255	64	56	120	160	34	6	3	9	22
NHL totals			79	4	3	7	34	2	0	0	0	0
