= Lloyd Klein (ice hockey) =

Canadian ice hockey player

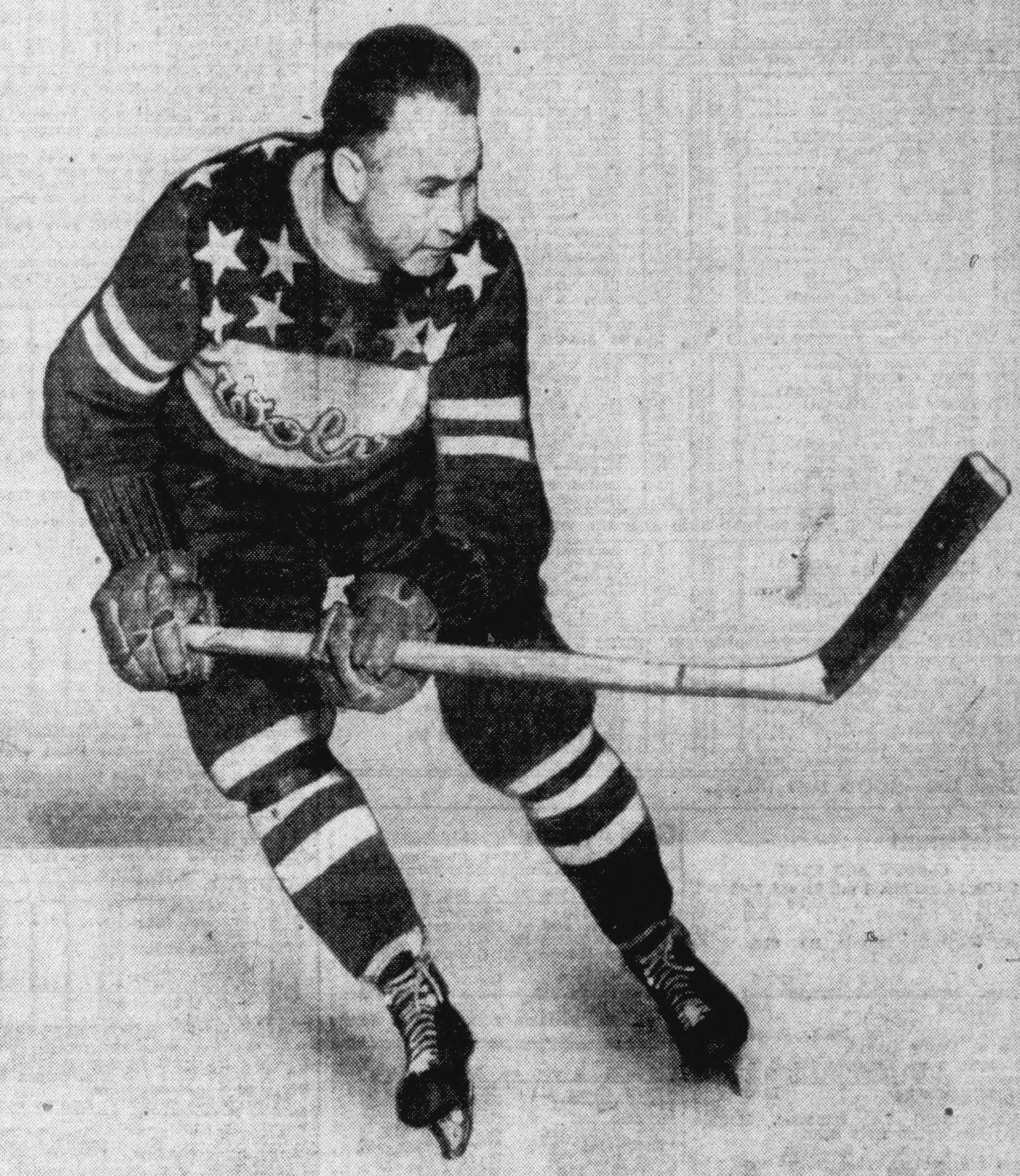
- Klein, circa 1946
- Born: January 13, 1910; Saskatoon, Saskatchewan, Canada
- Died: December 9, 1966 (aged 56)
- Height: 5 ft 11 in (180 cm)
- Weight: 185 lb (84 kg; 13 st 3 lb)
- Position: Right wing
- Shot: Left
- Played for: New York Americans; Boston Bruins
- Playing career: 1927–1948

James Lloyd Klein (January 13, 1910 in Saskatoon, Saskatchewan – December 9, 1966) was a Canadian professional ice hockey left winger. He played in the National Hockey League with the Boston Bruins and New York Americans between 1928 and 1937. The rest of his career, which lasted from 1927 to 1948, was mainly spent in the American Hockey League.

== Career ==
Klein played amateur hockey for the Saskatoon Wesleys from the 1924–25 season to the 1926–27 season.

He played 8 seasons in the National Hockey League for the Boston Bruins and New York Americans, winning the Stanley Cup in 1929 with the Boston Bruins.

Klein turned pro playing 21 seasons of pro hockey from the 1927–28 season to the 1947–48 season. He played 164 games in the NHL with 30 goals, 24 assists, 54 points, and 68 penalties in the regular season. He played only 5 playoffs games with no points and 2 penalties. However, most of his 21-year career was played in the minors. His nickname was "Deed".

== Career statistics ==
=== Regular season and playoffs ===
			Regular season					Playoffs
Season	Team	League	GP	G	A	Pts	PIM	GP	G	A	Pts	PIM
1924–25	Saskatoon Westleys	N-SJHL	7	5	1	6	—	4	1	0	1	0
1925–26	Saskatoon Westleys	N-SJHL	12	19	0	19	—	4	7	0	7	2
1925–26	Saskatoon Westleys	M-Cup	—	—	—	—	—	6	10	2	12	2
1926–27	Saskatoon Westleys	N-SJHL	6	6	1	7	17	2	3	0	3	2
1926–27	Saskatoon Westleys	M-Cup	—	—	—	—	—	4	8	1	9	11
1927–28	Saskatoon Sheiks	PrHL	27	15	6	21	33	—	—	—	—	—
1928–29	Boston Bruins	NHL	8	1	0	1	5	—	—	—	—	—
1928–29	Minneapolis Millers	AHA	9	1	1	2	2	—	—	—	—	—
1928–29	Providence Reds	Can-Am	1	0	0	0	2	—	—	—	—	—
1929–30	Philadelphia Arrows	Can-Am	32	13	0	13	46	2	1	0	1	4
1930–31	Syracuse Stars	IHL	32	19	3	22	34	—	—	—	—	—
1930–31	Boston Tigers	Can-Am	10	7	3	10	12	8	7	1	8	32
1931–32	Boston Bruins	NHL	5	1	0	1	0	—	—	—	—	—
1931–32	Boston Cubs	Can-Am	37	22	19	41	19	5	4	2	6	6
1932–33	Boston Cubs	Can-Am	28	15	15	30	30	—	—	—	—	—
1932–33	New York Americans	NHL	15	2	2	4	4	—	—	—	—	—
1933–34	New York Americans	NHL	48	13	9	22	34	—	—	—	—	—
1934–35	New York Americans	NHL	29	7	3	10	9	—	—	—	—	—
1934–35	New Haven Eagles	Can-Am	15	10	10	20	16	—	—	—	—	—
1935–36	New York Americans	NHL	42	4	8	12	14	5	0	0	0	2
1935–36	Rochester Cardinals	IHL	4	3	1	4	0	—	—	—	—	—
1936–37	New York Americans	NHL	14	2	1	3	2	—	—	—	—	—
1936–37	New Haven Eagles	IAHL	12	6	8	14	6	—	—	—	—	—
1936–37	Cleveland Falcons	IHAL	25	6	7	13	8	—	—	—	—	—
1937–38	New York Americans	NHL	3	0	1	1	0	—	—	—	—	—
1937–38	Pittsburgh Hornets	IAHL	43	11	21	32	10	2	2	0	2	2
1938–39	Hershey Bears	IAHL	49	17	15	32	32	5	0	1	1	4
1939–40	Hershey Bears	IAHL	17	4	3	7	0	—	—	—	—	—
1939–40	Syracuse Stars	IAHL	35	12	18	30	8	—	—	—	—	—
1940–41	Buffalo Bisons	AHL	50	12	23	35	20	—	—	—	—	—
1941–42	Buffalo Bisons	AHL	55	20	22	42	20	—	—	—	—	—
1942–43	Buffalo Bisons	AHL	52	22	42	64	11	9	5	10	15	0
1943–44	Buffalo Bisons	AHL	47	23	22	45	22	9	1	4	5	0
1944–45	Pittsburgh Hornets	AHL	56	30	36	66	27	—	—	—	—	—
1945–46	Pittsburgh Hornets	AHL	8	1	5	6	2	—	—	—	—	—
1945–46	Hollywood Wolves	PCHL	33	24	12	36	14	12	10	6	16	8
1946–47	Saskatoon Quakers	WCSHL	35	12	17	29	30	3	1	1	2	2
1947–48	Tacoma Rockets	PCHL	46	28	27	55	32	5	0	1	1	0
IAHL/AHL totals			449	164	222	54	386	25	8	15	23	6
NHL totals			164	30	24	54	68	5	0	0	0	2
