= Stan McCabe (ice hockey) =

Canadian ice hockey player (1908–1958)

- Born: June 16, 1908; Ottawa, Ontario, Canada
- Died: June 2, 1958 (aged 49)
- Height: 5 ft 6 in (168 cm)
- Weight: 165 lb (75 kg; 11 st 11 lb)
- Position: Left wing
- Shot: Left
- Played for: Detroit Cougars; Detroit Falcons; Montreal Maroons
- Playing career: 1926–1939

William Stanley McCabe (June 16, 1908 – June 2, 1958) was a Canadian ice hockey left winger. McCabe played 78 NHL games over four seasons for the Detroit Cougars, Detroit Falcons, and Montreal Maroons between 1929 and 1934. The rest of his career, which lasted from 1926 to 1939, was spent in various minor leagues.

== Career statistics ==
=== Regular season and playoffs ===
			Regular season					Playoffs
Season	Team	League	GP	G	A	Pts	PIM	GP	G	A	Pts	PIM
1924–25	Ottawa Gunners	OCJHL	6	1	0	1	—	—	—	—	—	—
1925–26	Ottawa Rideaus	OCJHL	15	10	0	10	—	—	—	—	—	—
1926–27	North Bay Trappers	NOHA	11	18	8	26	42	4	2	4	6	10
1927–28	Detroit Olympics	Can-Pro	41	15	4	19	31	2	0	0	0	4
1928–29	Detroit Olympics	Can-Pro	39	17	2	19	70	7	2	0	2	11
1929–30	Detroit Cougars	NHL	25	7	3	10	23	—	—	—	—	—
1929–30	Detroit Olympics	IHL	17	7	3	10	39	—	—	—	—	—
1930–31	Detroit Falcons	NHL	44	2	1	3	22	—	—	—	—	—
1931–32	Detroit Olympics	IHL	47	10	8	18	61	6	0	0	0	14
1932–33	Montreal Maroons	NHL	1	0	0	0	0	—	—	—	—	—
1932–33	Quebec Castors	Can-Am	47	11	19	30	46	—	—	—	—	—
1933–34	Montreal Maroons	NHL	8	0	0	0	4	—	—	—	—	—
1933–34	Quebec Castors	Can-Am	36	17	11	28	16	—	—	—	—	—
1934–35	Windsor Bulldogs	IHL	15	0	3	3	4	—	—	—	—	—
1934–35	Philadelphia Arrows	Can-Am	19	6	6	12	14	—	—	—	—	—
1935–36	Pittsburgh Shamrocks	IHL	44	7	17	24	15	—	—	—	—	—
1936–37	Oakland/Spokane Clippers	PCHL	14	0	1	1	2	—	—	—	—	—
1937–38	Detroit Pontiacs	MOHL	23	10	7	17	4	3	0	0	0	0
1938–39	Detroit Pontiacs	MOHL	21	5	6	11	10	7	1	0	1	0
NHL totals			78	9	4	13	49	—	—	—	—	—
