= Red Anderson (ice hockey) =

Canadian ice hockey player (1910–1991)

- Born: December 13, 1910 Tillsonburg, Ontario, Canada
- Died: June 16, 1991 (aged 80)
- Height: 6 ft 0 in (183 cm)
- Weight: 190 lb (86 kg; 13 st 8 lb)
- Position: Defence
- Shot: Right
- Played for: NHL; Boston Bruins; IAHL; Pittsburgh Shamrocks; Pittsburgh Hornets; New Haven Eagles; Cleveland Falcons; AHA; Minneapolis Millers; St. Paul Saints; Tulsa Oilers; EHL; Johnstown Blue Birds; Boston Olympics
- Playing career: 1936–1943

William "Red" Anderson (December 13, 1910 – June 16, 1991) was a Canadian ice hockey player who played one game with the Boston Bruins in the National Hockey League, appearing in a playoff game on March 27, 1943, against the Montreal Canadiens. He was born in Tillsonburg, Ontario.

== Career statistics ==
=== Regular season and playoffs ===
			Regular season					Playoffs
Season	Team	League	GP	G	A	Pts	PIM	GP	G	A	Pts	PIM
1933–34	Simcoe Travellers	OHA-Int	—	—	—	—	—	—	—	—	—	—
1934–35	London Tecumsehs	IHL	39	1	1	2	10	5	0	0	0	0
1935–36	London Tecumsehs	IHL	4	0	0	0	4	—	—	—	—	—
1935–36	Cleveland Falcons	IHL	16	1	1	2	15	2	0	0	0	0
1935–36	Pittsburgh Shamrocks	IHL	16	2	1	3	13	—	—	—	—	—
1935–36	Rochester Cardinals	IHL	8	0	1	1	17	—	—	—	—	—
1936–37	Cleveland Falcons	IAHL	1	0	0	0	0	—	—	—	—	—
1936–37	Minneapolis Millers	AHA	15	1	0	1	23	—	—	—	—	—
1936–37	Pittsburgh Hornets	IAHL	15	1	1	2	12	—	—	—	—	—
1937–38	St. Paul Saints	AHA	34	4	8	12	72	—	—	—	—	—
1938–39	St. Paul Saints	AHA	48	6	9	15	65	—	—	—	—	—
1939–40	Tulsa Oilers	AHA	46	3	19	22	91	—	—	—	—	—
1940–41	Tulsa Oilers	AHA	14	0	0	0	22	—	—	—	—	—
1941–42	Johnstown Blue Birds	EHL	59	11	31	42	122	—	—	—	—	—
1942–43	Boston Olympics	EHL	—	—	—	—	—	—	—	—	—	—
1942–43	Boston Bruins	NHL	—	—	—	—	—	1	0	0	0	0
AHA totals			159	14	36	50	293	3	0	1	1	10
NHL totals			—	—	—	—	—	1	0	0	0	0

== See also ==
- List of players who played only one game in the NHL
