= Melville Vail =

Canadian ice hockey player

- Born: July 5, 1906; Meaford, ON, CAN
- Died: January 29, 1983 (aged 76); Toronto, ON, CAN
- Height: 6 ft 0 in (183 cm)
- Weight: 185 lb (84 kg; 13 st 3 lb)
- Position: Defence/Left wing
- Shot: Left
- Played for: New York Rangers
- Playing career: 1926–1943

Melville Arthur "Sparky" Vail (July 5, 1906 – January 29, 1983) was a Canadian ice hockey player. He played 50 games in the National Hockey League for the New York Rangers during the 1928–29 and 1929–30 seasons, scoring four goals and five points. The rest of his career, which lasted from 1926 to 1943, was spent in the minor leagues.

Vail scored his first NHL goal on February 10, 1929 versus the Montreal Canadiens at Madison Square Garden. It was the final goal of the game, which ended in a 3-3 tie.

== Career statistics ==
=== Regular season and playoffs ===
			Regular season					Playoffs
Season	Team	League	GP	G	A	Pts	PIM	GP	G	A	Pts	PIM
1926–27	Springfield Indians	Can-Am	31	17	6	23	73	6	1	0	1	16
1927–28	Springfield Indians	Can-Am	39	18	4	22	92	4	1	1	2	14
1928–29	New York Rangers	NHL	18	3	0	3	16	6	0	0	0	2
1928–29	Springfield Indians	Can-Am	22	7	3	10	42	—	—	—	—	—
1929–30	New York Rangers	NHL	32	1	1	2	10	4	0	0	0	0
1929–30	Springfield Indians	Can-Am	9	1	2	3	30	—	—	—	—	—
1930–31	Providence Reds	Can-Am	38	12	21	33	44	—	—	—	—	—
1931–32	Providence Reds	Can-Am	36	7	18	25	40	1	0	0	0	2
1932–33	Providence Reds	Can-Am	41	6	12	18	20	2	0	0	0	0
1933–34	Windsor Bulldogs	IHL	42	4	8	12	53	—	—	—	—	—
1934–35	Cleveland Falcons	IHL	43	8	24	32	47	2	0	0	0	0
1935–36	Pittsburgh Shamrocks	IHL	45	5	12	17	52	—	—	—	—	—
1938–39	Toronto Red Indians	TIHL	30	3	15	18	57	13	4	14	18	28
1939–40	Toronto Red Indians	TIHL	33	3	25	28	30	3	0	5	5	0
1940–41	Toronto Red Indians	TIHL	27	6	12	18	18	4	0	1	1	0
1941–42	Toronto Red Indians	TIHL	16	1	9	10	4	—	—	—	—	—
1942–43	Toronto Red Indians	TIHL	9	0	8	8	2	—	—	—	—	—
Can-Am totals			216	68	66	134	341	13	2	1	3	32
NHL totals			50	4	1	5	26	10	0	0	0	2
