= Pittsburgh Shamrocks =

- City: Pittsburgh, Pennsylvania
- League: International Hockey League
- Division: West Division
- Operated: 1935–1936
- Home arena: Duquesne Garden
- Colors: Green, white
- Owners: Ray Babcock; James McKay; Phil Jacks
- General manager: Ray Babcock; Larry Welch
- Head coach: Sprague Cleghorn; Albert Hughes
- Captain: Albert Hughes
- Media: Pittsburgh Post-Gazette; Pittsburgh Press

Franchise history
- 1935–1936: Pittsburgh Shamrocks
- September 8 – October 9, 1935: Pittsburgh Professional Hockey Club, Inc.

The Pittsburgh Shamrocks were a professional ice hockey team based in Pittsburgh that played in the International Hockey League in 1935–36. The team played all of its home games at Duquesne Garden. During their lone season in existence, the Shamrocks finished in fourth place in the West Division behind the Detroit Olympics, Cleveland Falcons, and Windsor Bulldogs. The Shamrocks scored 137 goals and allowed 170. The team folded after one season. It is estimated that the team lost $36,000 during 1935–36 season.

== History ==
=== Origins ===
On September 8, 1935, Larry Welch, a longtime hockey promoter at Duquesne Garden, announced that Pittsburgh had secured a team in the International Hockey League, pending league approval. The club operated under the Pittsburgh Professional Hockey Club, Inc. with papers of incorporation being immediately applied for The team had then signed a two-year lease at the Garden and a plan was established that split the Garden's ice time between the new IHL team and the Pittsburgh Yellow Jackets, Pittsburgh's club in the Eastern Amateur Hockey League.

The team was coached by Sprague Cleghorn, who won two Stanley Cups with the Ottawa Senators in 1920 and 1921 and another with the Montreal Canadiens in 1924. However, he was also regarded as one of the dirtiest players in the National Hockey League, since he led the league in penalty minutes for nine of its first ten years. Prior to the formation of the Shamrocks, the Cleghorn family was already known to Pittsburgh's hockey fans. Sprague's brother, Odie, was the head coach of the Pittsburgh Pirates when they became the city's first NHL team for the 1924-25 season.

On October 9, 1935, the team was approved to play in the IHL. Meanwhile, a report in The Pittsburgh Press was the first to reference the team as the “Pittsburgh Shamrocks.”

=== Pre-season ===
Welch then announced that the Shamrocks would leave for Niagara Falls, Ontario, and conduct a training camp on October 21, 1935. The Shamrocks choose to train there since the ice surface at Duquesne Garden would not be ready for use until early November. In forming their team, Pittsburgh first laid claim to any spare players from the Montreal Canadiens. The team then negotiated a deal with the Philadelphia Arrows of the Canadian-American Hockey League which landed the Shamrocks; forwards Stan McCabe, Bill Hudson, Eddie Owens and defenseman Art Lilly. It was believed that Ted Saunders, who played in the NHL with the Ottawa Senators, before playing in the Canadian-American league, would be coming to Pittsburgh. However he spent the 1935–36 with the Springfield Indians.

The Shamrocks then signed several players with NHL experience. They first purchased Joe Starke, a goaltender from the Chicago Black Hawks. Next, the Shamrocks signed three players from the Detroit Red Wings: Norm Walker and brothers Earl and Desse Roche. The Roche brothers became the first brothers ever to play together on any professional Pittsburgh hockey team. Rookies Jean and Conrad Bourcier also made local history by becoming the second siblings to play professional hockey on the same Pittsburgh team when they joined the Shamrocks in late January. Meanwhile, Harold Darragh and Gordon Fraser, who both played in the NHL with the Pirates, were added to the roster. The Shamrocks also signed Nick Wasnie, won two Stanley Cups with the Montreal Canadiens in 1930 and 1931, and was credited by Aurel Joliat as being the first player to use the slap shot.

=== 1935–36 season ===
Members of the Pittsburgh Shamrocks (from left): Nick Wasnie, Bill Hudson, Scotty Martin, Conrad Bourcier, Henri Goulet and Jean Bourcier

On November 10, 1935, the Shamrocks opened their season on the road, against the Syracuse Stars. The game resulted in the Shamrocks defeating the Stars, 5–4. Two nights later, the team played in their home opener at Duquesne Garden against the Cleveland Falcons. The game's opening ceremonies featured a full orchestra. Meanwhile, Garnet Sixsmith, who played in the Western Pennsylvania Hockey League and once scored eleven goals in a game at Duquesne Garden dropped the ceremonial puck. During the game, Bill Hudson scored a hat trick, which included the game-winner, as the Shamrocks defeated Cleveland, 6–5. However, on November 17, 1935, the Cleveland Falcons defeated the Shamrocks in Cleveland, 2-0, and the team began a five-game losing streak. Included in that streak was a 3–0 loss to the Buffalo Bisons which resulted in the Pittsburgh Press describing the Shamrocks as "a very mediocre team". Finally, goaltender Joe Starke ended the streak and earned the first Shamrocks shutout in a 1-0 win over the London Tecumsehs. The team improved slightly with the addition of Red Anderson and Roger Cormier, however they dropped their next four games. The team's record, through just its six weeks of play, did not sit well with its ownership. On December 20, 1935, Larry Welch was fired as the team's general manager. A statement by Phil Jacks, the secretary-treasurer of the Shamrocks, read "We are sick and tired of the way the club has been going. We mean to wreck it from top to bottom if it doesn't start winning. That means several players will be put in their places or sent home." Meanwhile, coach Sprague Cleghorn was placed on a probationary status by the team.

Pittsburgh did win three games during a home stand in late December, in what would be the longest winning streak in the team’s history. The Shamrocks later hosted the Tecumsehs on January 10, 1936, and set a record for the IHL by scoring nine goals in a 9-3 win. Four nights later, Pittsburgh tied Cleveland, 4–4, for its only tie of the season. The week ended with Starke’s second, and final, shutout after a 1-0 victory over Syracuse. Starke would play five more games for Pittsburgh; his last game was on February 5, 1936, against the Buffalo Bisons. During the game, Starke was injured at some point during the game's second period. Starke did not return for the third period and was replaced by Paul Gauthier, a Montreal Canadiens signee on loan to the Shamrocks. Starke was released by the team five days later.

On March 2, 1936, Cleghorn was dismissed by the Shamrocks and was replaced by Albert Hughes, the team's captain, for the team's 11 remaining games. According to media reports, Cleghorn refused to leave with the team for a game in Windsor because he claimed that the team had not been paid three days earlier. However, the Shamrocks' ownership stated that the reason Cleghorn did not accompany the Shamrocks team on their trip, and was relieved of his coaching duties, was because he had to be disciplined for "misconduct covering the past month". On March 14, 1936, Cleghorn filed a lawsuit against the Shamrocks ownership, claiming that he was owed $1,420.50 by the club. The ex-coach claimed that he was owed $420.50 in salary since March 2, and a $1,000 bonus, covered by his contract.

On March 16, 1936, the Shamrocks played their final game at Duquesne Garden. During the game, the Shamrocks were trailing the Windsor Bulldogs 6–1, going into the third period. The Shamrocks scored five goals, however they still lost the game, 7–6. The team's next game, against the Detroit Olympics on March 17, 1936, was cancelled due to the Great St. Patrick's Day Flood. Pittsburgh won their final game, 5–2, against the Syracuse Stars on March 22, 1936. The Shamrocks finished with a record of 18–27–1 and lost over $40,000 in four months of play. A group of fifteen players arrived in Pittsburgh on November 3, 1936, to play for the Shamrocks. The only player, of the group, who played with the Shamrocks the year prior was Bill Huson. The second season never took place as the team folded.

== Legacy ==
Contrary to popular belief, the Shamrocks did not evolve into the Pittsburgh Hornets. After winning the IHL championship in 1936, the Detroit Olympics moved to Pittsburgh to become the Hornets. On October 4, 1936, Pittsburgh theatre chain owner, John Harris, purchased the Olympics of the International-American Hockey League and merged them with players from the Pittsburgh Yellow Jackets and the Shamrocks. The team was renamed Pittsburgh Hornets. Bill "Red" Anderson and Bill Hudson were the only two players from the Shamrocks to be on the Hornets roster at the start of the 1936–37 season.

== 1935–36 players statistics ==
#	Nat	Player	Pos	GP	G	A	Pts	PIM	Birthplace
8	(Canada)	Bill "Ace" Hudson	C	46	20	23	43	16	Calgary, Alberta
9	(Canada)	Nick Wasnie	RW	35	14	22	36	58	Winnipeg, Manitoba
10	(Canada)	Scott "Flash" Martin	LW	46	2	19	39	33	Brantford, Ontario
4	(United States)	Dick Benson	C	41	14	20	34	12	Buffalo, New York
44	(Canada)	Stan McCabe	LW	7	17	24	15	-	Ottawa, Ontario
-	(Canada)	Earl Roche	LW	28	12	11	23	30	Prescott, Ontario
18	(Canada)	Harold Darragh	RW	41	7	14	21	4	Ottawa, Ontario
2	(United States)	Eddie Owens	RW	43	5	13	18	64	Duluth, Minnesota
5,6	(Canada)	Melville "Sparky" Vail	D	45	5	12	17	52	Saskatchewan
-	(Canada)	Desmond Roche	RW	25	7	7	14	26	Kemptville, Ontario
16	(Canada)	Jean-Louis Bourcier	LW	18	8	5	13	4	Montreal, Quebec
12	(Canada)	Henri Goulet	LW	-	7	5	12	22	Trois Rivieres, Quebec
14	(Canada)	Phil Piche	C	-	1	6	7	0	Portneuf Quebec
-	(Canada)	Gord Fraser	D	15	4	2	6'	14	Pembroke, Ontario
19	(Canada)	Albert "Rusty" Hughes (C)	C	32	1	5	6	64	Guelph, Ontario
2,3	(Canada)	Bill Holmes	C	21	1	4	5	8	Portage la Prairie, Manitoba
-	(Canada)	Bill "Red" Anderson	D	15	2	1	3	13	Tillsonburg, Ontario
15	(Canada)	Conrad Bourcier	C	9	2	2	4	2	Montreal, Quebec
-		Norm Walker	RW	8	0	1	1	2	
-	(Canada)	Ludger Desmarais	D	4	0	0	0	2	Sudbury, Ontario
-	(United States)	Art "Leroy" Lilly	D	5	0	0	0	2	Minnesota
-	(Canada)	Wilford Ranger	LW	4	0	0	0	0	Peterborough, Ontario
-	(Canada)	Roger Cormier	RW	3	0	0	0	0	Montreal, Quebec
-	(Canada)	Len LeBlanc	D	3	0	0	0	0	Montreal, Quebec

#	Nat	Goalie	GP	W	L	T	Min	GA	GAA	SO	Birthplace
1	(Canada)	Paul Gauthier	16	7	9	0	990	56	3.39	0	Winnipeg, Manitoba
1	(Canada)	Joe Starke	30	11	18	1	1850	114	3.69	2	Toronto, Ontario
