= Frank Ingram =

Canadian ice hockey player (1905–1985)

- Born: September 17, 1905; Craven, Saskatchewan, Canada
- Died: April 15, 1985 (aged 79); Edmond, Oklahoma, U.S.
- Height: 5 ft 8 in (173 cm)
- Weight: 185 lb (84 kg; 13 st 3 lb)
- Position: Right wing
- Shot: Right
- Played for: Chicago Blackhawks
- Playing career: 1925–1940

Francis Hamilton Ingram (September 17, 1905 – April 15, 1985) was a Canadian professional ice hockey right winger who played three seasons in the National Hockey League (NHL) for the Chicago Black Hawks between 1929 and 1932. The rest of his career, which lasted from 1925 to 1940, was spent in various minor leagues. Ingram was also a member of the 1935 to 1936 AHA Second All-Star Teams.

== Career statistics ==
=== Regular season and playoffs ===
			Regular season					Playoffs
Season	Team	League	GP	G	A	Pts	PIM	GP	G	A	Pts	PIM
1922–23	Regina Boat Club	S-SJHL	2	1	1	2	0	—	—	—	—	—
1923–24	Regina Pats	S-SJHL	6	3	1	4	5	—	—	—	—	—
1923–24	Regina Pats	M-Cup	—	—	—	—	—	1	1	0	1	0
1924–25	Regina Pats	S-SJHL	5	11	1	12	5	—	—	—	—	—
1924–25	Regina Pats	M-Cup	—	—	—	—	—	12	10	5	15	29
1925–26	Regina Victorias	S-SSHL	17	18	12	30	13	—	—	—	—	—
1925–26	Regina Victorias	Al-Cup	—	—	—	—	—	9	12	8	20	4
1926–27	Fort William Forts	TBSHL	6	1	0	1	5	—	—	—	—	—
1926–27	Regina Capitals	PHL	14	3	3	6	2	—	—	—	—	—
1927–28	St. Paul Saints	AHA	40	5	6	11	46	—	—	—	—	—
1928–29	St. Paul Saints	AHA	40	20	4	24	69	—	—	—	—	—
1929–30	Chicago Black Hawks	NHL	37	6	10	16	28	2	0	0	0	0
1930–31	Chicago Black Hawks	NHL	43	17	4	21	37	9	0	1	1	2
1931–32	Chicago Black Hawks	NHL	21	1	2	3	4	—	—	—	—	—
1931–32	Pittsburgh Yellow Jackets	IHL	15	6	3	9	21	—	—	—	—	—
1931–32	Philadelphia Arrows	Can-Am	8	1	3	4	13	—	—	—	—	—
1932–33	Boston Cubs	Can-Am	5	0	0	0	2	—	—	—	—	—
1932–33	Cleveland Indians	IHL	36	10	9	19	49	—	—	—	—	—
1933–34	Detroit Olympics	IHL	11	0	1	1	6	—	—	—	—	—
1933–34	Oklahoma City Warriors	AHA	42	6	7	13	40	—	—	—	—	—
1934–35	Oklahoma City Warriors	AHA	45	21	21	42	26	—	—	—	—	—
1935–36	Oklahoma City Warriors	AHA	48	20	18	38	8	—	—	—	—	—
1936–37	St. Louis Flyers	AHA	44	4	17	21	6	—	—	—	—	—
1937–38	Kansas City Greyhounds	AHA	48	12	24	36	11	—	—	—	—	—
1938–39	Kansas City Greyhounds	AHA	16	1	3	4	4	—	—	—	—	—
1939–40	Wichita Skyhawks	AHA	6	0	2	2	2	—	—	—	—	—
AHA totals			329	89	102	191	212	14	2	2	4	4
NHL totals			101	24	16	40	69	11	0	1	1	2
