= Harold Darragh =

Canadian ice hockey player

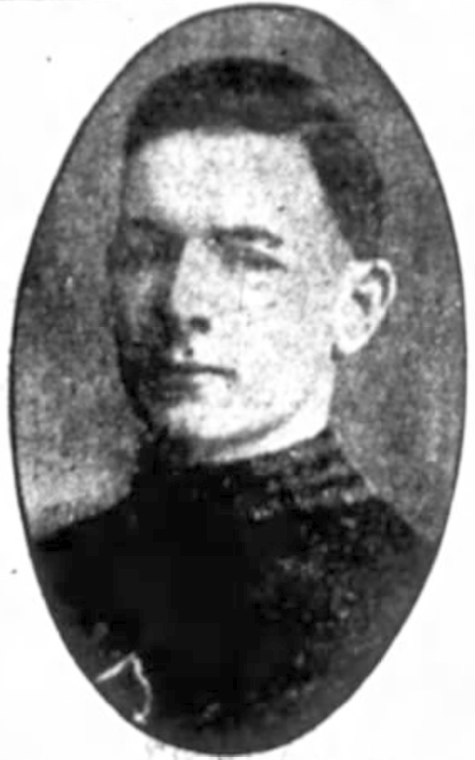
- Born: September 13, 1902; Ottawa, Ontario, Canada
- Died: April 28, 1993 (aged 90); Ottawa, Ontario, Canada
- Height: 5 ft 9 in (175 cm)
- Weight: 145 lb (66 kg; 10 st 5 lb)
- Position: Right wing
- Shot: Right
- Played for: NHL; Pittsburgh Pirates; Philadelphia Quakers; Boston Bruins; Toronto Maple Leafs; IHL; Pittsburgh Shamrocks; Syracuse Stars
- Playing career: 1925–1936

Harold Edward "Howl" Darragh (September 13, 1902 – April 28, 1993) was a Canadian ice hockey right winger who played eight seasons in the National Hockey League for the Pittsburgh Pirates, Philadelphia Quakers, Boston Bruins and Toronto Maple Leafs between 1925 and 1933. He was born in Ottawa, Ontario. He won his only Stanley Cup in 1932 with the Toronto Maple Leafs.

Harold was a younger brother of the NHL player Jack Darragh.

He was the last surviving former player of the Pittsburgh Pirates. He is buried at Beechwood Cemetery in Ottawa.

== Career statistics ==
=== Regular season and playoffs ===
			Regular season					Playoffs
Season	Team	League	GP	G	A	Pts	PIM	GP	G	A	Pts	PIM
1918–19	Ottawa CPR Bluebirds	OCHL	—	—	—	—	—	—	—	—	—	—
1919–20	Ottawa Gunners	OCHL	7	4	0	4	—	—	—	—	—	—
1920–21	Ottawa Gunners	OCHL	12	8	0	8	—	7	5	6	11	3
1921–22	Ottawa Gunners	OCHL	14	12	7	19	0	6	12	7	19	0
1922–23	Ottawa Gunners	OCHL	1	0	0	0	0	—	—	—	—	—
1922–23	Pittsburgh Yellow Jackets	USAHA	16	8	0	8	—	—	—	—	—	—
1923–24	Ottawa New Edinburghs	OCHL	12	6	4	10	—	2	0	0	0	—
1924–25	Pittsburgh Yellow Jackets	USAHA	40	14	0	14	—	8	3	0	3	—
1925–26	Pittsburgh Pirates	NHL	35	10	7	17	6	2	1	0	1	0
1926–27	Pittsburgh Pirates	NHL	42	12	3	15	4	—	—	—	—	—
1927–28	Pittsburgh Pirates	NHL	44	13	2	15	16	2	0	1	1	0
1928–29	Pittsburgh Pirates	NHL	43	9	3	12	6	—	—	—	—	—
1929–30	Pittsburgh Pirates	NHL	42	15	17	32	6	—	—	—	—	—
1930–31	Philadelphia Quakers	NHL	10	1	1	2	2	—	—	—	—	—
1930–31	Boston Bruins	NHL	25	2	4	6	4	5	0	1	1	2
1931–32	Toronto Maple Leafs	NHL	48	5	10	15	6	7	0	1	1	2
1932–33	Toronto Maple Leafs	NHL	19	1	2	3	0	—	—	—	—	—
1932–33	Syracuse Stars	IHL	24	7	13	20	4	6	2	0	2	0
1933–34	Syracuse Stars	IHL	44	9	10	19	12	6	0	1	1	0
1935–36	Pittsburgh Shamrocks	IHL	41	7	14	21	4	—	—	—	—	—
NHL totals			308	68	49	117	50	16	1	3	4	4

== Awards and achievements ==
- 1932 Stanley Cup Champion (Toronto)
