= Teddy Saunders =

Canadian ice hockey player

- Born: August 29, 1911; Ottawa, Ontario, Canada
- Died: May 21, 2002 (aged 90); Aurora, Ontario, Canada
- Height: 5 ft 8 in (173 cm)
- Weight: 165 lb (75 kg; 11 st 11 lb)
- Position: Right wing
- Shot: Right
- Played for: Ottawa Senators
- Playing career: 1930–1944

Clarence Arthur "Ted, Teddy" Saunders (August 29, 1911 – May 21, 2002) was a Canadian professional ice hockey player who played 19 games in the National Hockey League with the Ottawa Senators in their final season of 1933–34. The rest of his career, which lasted from 1930 to 1944, was spent in various minor leagues. He played for the Ottawa Commandos which won the 1943 Allan Cup. Before his death, he was the last surviving member of the original Ottawa Senators.

== Career statistics ==
=== Regular season and playoffs ===
| | | | Regular season | | | | | Playoffs |
| Season | Team | League | GP | G | A | Pts | PIM | GP | G | A | Pts | PIM |
|---|---|---|---|---|---|---|---|---|---|---|---|---|
| 1928–29 | Ottawa New Edinburghs | OCHL | 15 | 3 | 1 | 4 | — | 2 | 1 | 0 | 1 | 0 |
| 1929–30 | Iroquois Falls Eskimos | NOHA | — | — | — | — | — | — | — | — | — | — |
| 1930–31 | Springfield Indians | Can-Am | 38 | 19 | 4 | 23 | 28 | 7 | 3 | 2 | 5 | 6 |
| 1931–32 | Springfield Indians | Can-Am | 30 | 5 | 4 | 8 | 20 | — | — | — | — | — |
| 1931–32 | Cleveland Indians | IHL | 6 | 0 | 0 | 0 | 2 | — | — | — | — | — |
| 1932–33 | Boston Cubs | Can-Am | 47 | 29 | 10 | 39 | 82 | 7 | 5 | 2 | 7 | 18 |
| 1933–34 | Ottawa Senators | NHL | 18 | 1 | 3 | 4 | 4 | — | — | — | — | — |
| 1933–34 | Detroit Olympics | IHL | 21 | 1 | 4 | 5 | 14 | 6 | 0 | 0 | 0 | 4 |
| 1934–35 | Philadelphia Arrows | Can-Am | 48 | 28 | 20 | 48 | 35 | — | — | — | — | — |
| 1935–36 | Springfield Indians | Can-Am | 48 | 19 | 22 | 41 | 36 | 3 | 0 | 0 | 0 | 0 |
| 1936–37 | Springfield Indians | IAHL | 45 | 17 | 13 | 30 | 44 | 5 | 1 | 0 | 1 | 2 |
| 1937–38 | Springfield Indians | IAHL | 45 | 8 | 21 | 29 | 41 | — | — | — | — | — |
| 1938–39 | Springfield Indians | IAHL | 53 | 10 | 19 | 29 | 33 | 3 | 0 | 1 | 1 | 2 |
| 1939–40 | St. Paul Saints | AHA | 46 | 23 | 25 | 48 | 51 | 7 | 6 | 4 | 10 | 4 |
| 1940–41 | St. Paul Saints | AHA | 46 | 18 | 15 | 33 | 14 | 4 | 2 | 1 | 3 | 0 |
| 1941–42 | Ottawa Commandos | QSHL | 40 | 31 | 25 | 56 | 20 | 8 | 2 | 2 | 4 | 4 |
| 1942–43 | Ottawa Commandos | QSHL | 28 | 10 | 13 | 23 | 15 | — | — | — | — | — |
| 1942–43 | Ottawa Army | OCHL | 9 | 10 | 8 | 18 | 2 | — | — | — | — | — |
| 1943–44 | Truro Bearcats | NSNDL | 10 | 17 | 6 | 23 | 0 | — | — | — | — | — |
| Can-Am totals | | | 211 | 100 | 59 | 159 | 201 | 17 | 8 | 4 | 12 | 24 |
| NHL totals | | | 18 | 1 | 3 | 4 | 4 | — | — | — | — | — |

== Transactions ==
- October 4, 1933 — traded to Ottawa by Boston with Perk Galbraith and Bob Cook for Bob Gracie.
- December 8, 1933 — traded by Ottawa Senators to Detroit Olympics for cash.
