= Bourcier =

Bourcier is a French surname. Notable persons with that surname include:

- Conrad Bourcier (1915–1987), Canadian ice hockey player
- François Antoine Louis Bourcier (1760–1828), French cavalry officer
- Jean Bourcier (1911–1989), Canadian ice hockey player
- John P. Bourcier (1927–2002), Justice of the Rhode Island Supreme Court
- Jules Bourcier (1797–1873), French naturalist
