= Paul Gauthier (ice hockey) =

Canadian ice hockey player

- Born: December 8, 1915 Winnipeg, Manitoba, Canada
- Died: March 10, 1984 (aged 68) Riverside, California, U.S.
- Height: 5 ft 5 in (165 cm)
- Weight: 125 lb (57 kg; 8 st 13 lb)
- Position: Goaltender
- Caught: Right
- Played for: Montreal Canadiens
- Playing career: 1935–1949

Paul Joseph Alphonse Gauthier (December 8, 1915 – March 10, 1984) was a Canadian professional ice hockey goaltender who played one game in the National Hockey League for the Montreal Canadiens during the 1937–38 season, on January 13, 1938 against the Chicago Black Hawks. The rest of his career, which lasted from 1935 to 1949, was spent in the minor leagues. He was the lightest goalie to ever play in the NHL, weighing in at 125 lbs.

== Career statistics ==
=== Regular season and playoffs ===
			Regular season								Playoffs
Season	Team	League	GP	W	L	T	MIN	GA	SO	GAA	GP	W	L	MIN	GA	SO	GAA
1932–33	Winnipeg Monarchs	WDJHL	1	1	0	0	60	1	0	1.00	—	—	—	—	—	—	—
1933–34	Winnipeg Blues	MJHL	7	—	—	—	420	15	0	2.14	—	—	—	—	—	—	—
1934–35	Winnipeg Maroons	MJHL	8	6	2	0	480	25	1	3.13	4	4	0	240	12	0	3.00
1934–35	Winnipeg Maroons	M-Cup	—	—	—	—	—	—	—	—	8	6	2	480	25	1	3.13
1935–36	Montreal Senior Canadiens	MCHL	1	0	1	0	30	3	0	6.00	—	—	—	—	—	—	—
1935–36	Pittsburgh Shamrocks	IHL	16	7	9	0	990	56	0	3.39	—	—	—	—	—	—	—
1936–37	Minneapolis Millers	AHA	48	23	21	4	2880	105	6	2.19	6	6	0	408	8	1	1.18
1937–38	Montreal Canadiens	NHL	1	0	0	1	70	2	0	1.71	—	—	—	—	—	—	—
1937–38	New Haven Eagles	IAHL	47	13	27	7	2910	126	5	2.60	1	0	1	60	2	0	2.00
1938–39	Spokane Clippers	PCHL	34	—	—	—	2040	105	3	3.09	—	—	—	—	—	—	—
1938–39	New Haven Eagles	IAHL	6	1	5	0	370	30	0	4.86	—	—	—	—	—	—	—
1939–40	Kansas City Greyhounds	AHA	47	20	27	0	2871	163	6	3.41	—	—	—	—	—	—	—
1940–41	Seattle Olympics	PCHL	41	—	—	—	2460	131	1	3.20	2	1	1	120	5	0	2.50
1941–42	Washington Lions	AHL	9	5	4	0	540	34	0	3.78	—	—	—	—	—	—	—
1941–42	New Haven Eagles	AHL	1	0	1	0	60	8	0	8.00	—	—	—	—	—	—	—
1942–43	Washington Lions	AHL	41	10	26	5	2530	203	0	4.81	—	—	—	—	—	—	—
1943–44	Buffalo Bisons	AHL	1	1	0	0	60	3	0	3.00	—	—	—	—	—	—	—
1943–44	Cleveland Barons	AHL	46	29	10	7	2760	139	4	3.02	4	1	3	240	25	0	6.25
1944–45	Cleveland Barons	AHL	4	3	0	1	240	15	0	3.75	—	—	—	—	—	—	—
1946–47	Houston Huskies	USHL	16	4	10	2	960	69	1	4.31	—	—	—	—	—	—	—
1946–47	Philadelphia Rockets	AHL	1	0	1	0	60	9	0	9.00	—	—	—	—	—	—	—
1946–47	Buffalo Bisons	AHL	3	3	0	0	180	7	0	2.33	—	—	—	—	—	—	—
1946–47	San Francisco Shamrocks	PCHL	5	—	—	—	300	19	0	3.80	—	—	—	—	—	—	—
1947–48	Houston Huskies	USHL	27	16	9	1	1640	112	1	4.10	7	5	2	423	19	0	2.70
1947–48	Omaha Knights	USHL	5	1	3	1	310	29	0	5.61	—	—	—	—	—	—	—
1948–49	Washington Lions	AHL	13	1	9	0	716	72	0	6.03	—	—	—	—	—	—	—
AHL totals			172	66	83	20	10,426	646	9	3.72	5	1	4	300	27	0	5.40
NHL totals			1	0	0	1	60	2	0	1.71	—	—	—	—	—	—	—

== See also ==
- List of players who played only one game in the NHL
