= Bill Hudson (ice hockey) =

Canadian ice hockey player

- Born: July 14, 1910; Calgary, Alberta, Canada
- Died: February 17, 1988 (aged 77); Calgary, Alberta, Canada
- Height: 5 ft 8 in (173 cm)
- Weight: 148 lb (67 kg; 10 st 8 lb)
- Position: Centre
- Shot: Left
- Played for: 'AHA'; St. Louis Flyers; Kansas City Americans; Omaha Knights 'CAHL'; Philadelphia Arrows 'IHL'; Pittsburgh Shamrocks; Pittsburgh Hornets 'AHL'; Hershey Bears; Indianapolis Capitals; Providence Reds
- Playing career: 1930–1945

Bertram William Hudson (July 14, 1910 – February 17, 1988) was a Canadian professional ice hockey player from 1930 until 1945.

== Career ==
During his career time, Hudson played for St. Louis Flyers, Kansas City Americans, Omaha Knights, Philadelphia Arrows, Pittsburgh Shamrocks, Pittsburgh Hornets, Hershey Bears, Indianapolis Capitals and the Providence Reds. During the 1935–36 season, Hudson led the Shamrocks with 20 goals. He was also one of only two Shamrocks players to become members of the Pittsburgh Hornets. Later in his career, Hudson worked as a player-coach for the Kansas City Americans in 1940.
