= Donnie Hughes =

Canadian ice hockey coach (1909-1977)

- Born: 1909; Ottawa, Canada
- Occupation: Ice hockey coach

Donnie Hughes (1909 – April 19, 1977) was a Canadian ice hockey coach. He coached the Detroit Olympics and later became the first coach of the Pittsburgh Hornets.

== Information ==
Hughes was described as a well-known Ottawa athlete and trainer.

Hughes was a trainer for the Detroit Olympics of the International Hockey League prior to 1935. On January 2, 1935, at the age of 26, he became the coach of the team, succeeding Burton Lederman. He was the youngest manager in the history of the IHL at the time. He coached the team until 1936. He led the Olympics to the IHL championship during the 1935–36 season and may have also led them to a title during the 1934–35 season.

He led the Pittsburgh Hornets to the 1936-37 IHL Playoffs where they were defeated in the second round. In his season and final season in Pittsburgh, he led the team to the second round of the 1937-38 IHL Playoffs.

Hughes resigned as head coach of the Pittsburgh Hornets during the 1938–39 season with Larry Aurie replacing him. It was rumored that he had resigned due to Jack Adams being unhappy with his development of players.

He coached the University of Detroit hockey team from 1967 to 1969.

He later became the vice president of the Detroit Red Wings alumni association.

== Personal life ==
He had four sisters and multiple family members in the armed forces. He was described as being a "blue-eyed, curly-haired Irishman". It is said that he had worked for an auto manufacturer in Detroit during the off-season and later joined the Navy. He was friends with goalie John Ross Roach. He married Helen Duggan on October 12, 1957. Hughes died on April 19, 1977.
