= Ludger Desmarais =

Canadian ice hockey player

- Born: April 25, 1906 Sudbury, Ontario, Canada
- Died: Unknown
- Position: Defenceman
- Played for: IHL; Pittsburgh Shamrocks; CAHL; Springfield Indians; Boston Tigers; Providence Reds; Philadelphia Arrows; AHA; Wichita Skyhawks; Kansas City Greyhounds
- Playing career: 1926–1939

Ludger Desmarais was a Canadian professional ice hockey defenceman. He was born in Sudbury, Ontario, Canada.

== Playing career ==
Desmarais played for the Pittsburgh Shamrocks of the International Hockey League. He also spent much of his playing time in the Canadian-American Hockey League with the Springfield Indians, Boston Tigers, Providence Reds and the Philadelphia Arrows. He finished his career playing in the American Hockey Association with the Wichita Skyhawks and the Kansas City Greyhounds. He finished his career with Wichita in 1939.
