= Conrad Bourcier =

Canadian ice hockey player

- Born: May 28, 1916; Montreal, Quebec, Canada
- Died: October 5, 1987 (aged 71); Verdun, Quebec, Canada
- Height: 5 ft 7 in (170 cm)
- Weight: 145 lb (66 kg; 10 st 5 lb)
- Position: Centre
- Shot: Left
- Played for: Montreal Canadiens
- Playing career: 1934–1949

Joseph Alphonse Conrad Bourcier (May 28, 1916 – October 5, 1987) was a Canadian ice hockey centre. He played 6 games in the National Hockey League with the Montreal Canadiens during the 1935–36 season. The rest of his career, which lasted from 1934 to 1949, was mainly spent in the Quebec Hockey League. He was born in Montreal, Quebec.

== Playing career ==
Bourcier played for the Pittsburgh Shamrocks of the International Hockey League, the Montreal Canadiens during the 1935–36 NHL season, as well as a single game with the Cornwall Cookies of the Quebec Provincial Hockey League. His brother Jean also played for Montreal and Pittsburgh throughout the same seasons.

== Career statistics ==
=== Regular season and playoffs ===
			Regular season					Playoffs
Season	Team	League	GP	G	A	Pts	PIM	GP	G	A	Pts	PIM
1934–35	Verdun Maple Leafs	MTL Sr	10	5	12	17	0	6	6	4	10	4
1935–36	Montreal Canadiens	NHL	6	0	0	0	0	—	—	—	—	—
1935–36	Verdun Maple Leafs	MTL Sr	10	5	1	6	4	—	—	—	—	—
1935–36	Pittsburgh Shamrocks	IHL	9	2	2	4	2	—	—	—	—	—
1936–37	Verdun Maple Leafs	MTL Sr	—	—	—	—	—	—	—	—	—	—
1937–38	Verdun Maple Leafs	QSHL	21	4	6	10	8	8	4	6	10	12
1938–39	Verdun Maple Leafs	QSHL	22	10	9	19	16	2	0	0	0	0
1939–40	Verdun Bulldogs	QPHL	41	21	32	53	30	2	1	0	1	2
1940–41	Verdun Maple Leafs	QSHL	32	12	12	24	17	—	—	—	—	—
1941–42	Montreal Cyclones	QPHL	7	8	4	12	12	—	—	—	—	—
1944–45	Montreal Cyclones	QPHL	—	14	11	25	—	—	—	—	—	—
1944–45	Cornwall Cookies	QPHL	1	0	0	0	0	—	—	—	—	—
1945–46	Saint-Hyacinthe Saints	QPHL	8	4	6	10	6	4	2	0	2	0
1946–47	Verdun Eagles	QPHL	47	40	28	68	24	—	—	—	—	—
1948–49	Montreal Hydro Quebec	MCHL	12	10	13	23	—	—	—	—	—	—
NHL totals			6	0	0	0	0	—	—	—	—	—
