= Jean Bourcier =

Canadian ice hockey player

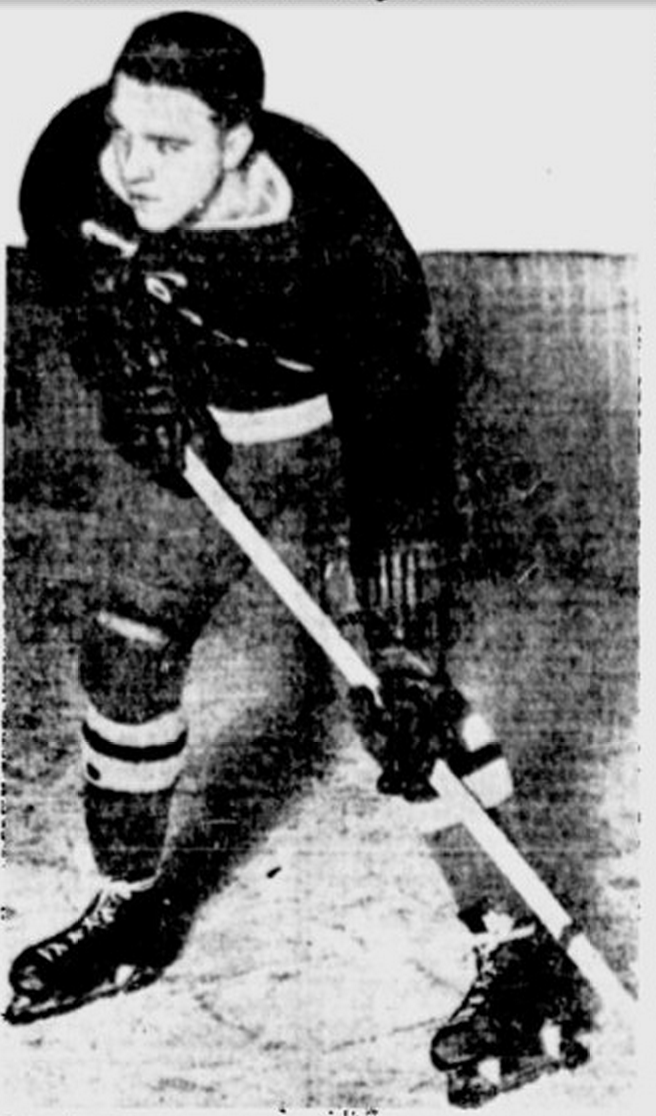
- Born: January 3, 1911; Montreal, Quebec, Canada
- Died: June 20, 1989 (aged 78); Brossard, Quebec, Canada
- Height: 5 ft 11 in (180 cm)
- Weight: 175 lb (79 kg; 12 st 7 lb)
- Position: Left wing
- Shot: Left
- Played for: Montreal Canadiens
- Playing career: 1933–1941

Jean Louis Bourcier (January 3, 1911 – June 20, 1989) was a Canadian professional ice hockey left winger. He played 9 games in the 1935–36 season. The rest of his career, which lasted from 1933 to 1941, was spent in the minor leagues.

== Playing career ==
Bourcier played for the Pittsburgh Shamrocks of the International Hockey League followed by the Montreal Canadiens during the 1935–36 season. His brother Conrad also played for Montreal and Pittsburgh during the same seasons.

== Career statistics ==
=== Regular season and playoffs ===
			Regular season					Playoffs
Season	Team	League	GP	G	A	Pts	PIM	GP	G	A	Pts	PIM
1933–34	Verdun Maple Leafs	MTL Sr	16	15	6	21	2	2	0	1	1	0
1934–35	Verdun Maple Leafs	MTL Sr	20	22	18	40	4	—	—	—	—	—
1935–36	Montreal Canadiens	NHL	9	0	1	1	0	—	—	—	—	—
1935–36	Verdun Maple Leafs	MTL Sr	10	11	8	19	2	—	—	—	—	—
1935–36	Pittsburgh Shamrocks	IHL	18	8	5	13	4	—	—	—	—	—
1936–37	Verdun Maple Leafs	MTL Sr	—	—	—	—	—	—	—	—	—	—
1937–38	Verdun Maple Leafs	QSHL	22	16	13	29	0	8	0	3	3	14
1938–39	Verdun Maple Leafs	QSHL	21	10	3	13	10	2	1	0	1	0
1939–40	Verdun Bulldogs	QSHL	39	22	20	42	8	2	2	2	4	0
1940–41	Verdun Maple Leafs	QSHL	13	5	4	9	0	—	—	—	—	—
QSHL totals			56	31	20	51	10	10	1	3	4	14
NHL totals			9	0	1	1	0	—	—	—	—	—
