= Syracuse Eagles =

Former American ice hockey team

- City: Syracuse, New York
- League: American Hockey League
- Operated: 1974–75
- Home arena: Onondaga County War Memorial Coliseum

Franchise history
- 1929–1934: Cleveland Indians
- 1934–1937: Cleveland Falcons
- 1937–1973: Cleveland Barons
- 1973–1974: Jacksonville Barons
- 1974–1975: Syracuse Eagles

The Syracuse Eagles were a professional ice hockey team based in Syracuse, New York. The team relocated from Jacksonville, Florida that summer who were known as the Jacksonville Barons and previously the Cleveland Barons who were one of the most historic and illustrious teams of the American Hockey League from the 1930s to the 1960s. The team played home games in the Onondaga County War Memorial Coliseum. The Eagles were a member of the American Hockey League for one season during 1974–75, finishing fourth with a record of 21 wins, 43 losses and 11 ties. Coaching duties were split by Art Stratton, Billy Orr (on an interim basis) and John Hanna. The team leading scorer was Dick Sarrazin (33 goals and 37 assists in 75 games), with Jacques Caron registering a 3.70 goals against average during 50 games in goal.

The city of Syracuse struggled to support two minor league teams during the 1974–75 season. After the Syracuse Blazers won the 1973 Eastern Hockey League title, that league folded. The Syracuse Blazers moved to the newly formed North American Hockey League, and were league champions in 1973–74 and 1976–77. A splinter group from the Blazers ownership were awarded an AHL franchise, dividing the city's fan base. Between the two teams they played 75 home games during the 1974–1975 regular season. The Eagles failed to garner sufficient spectator support to last a second season despite playing in a higher-level league.

== Results ==
Season	Games	Won	Lost	Tied	Points	Goals for	Goals against	Standing	Playoffs
1974–75	75	21	43	11	53	254	332	4th, South	Did not qualify

- Syracuse Eagles roster and statistics
