= Stewart Adams =

Stewart Adams may refer to:

- Stewart Adams (ice hockey) (1904–1978), Canadian ice hockey player
- Stewart Adams (chemist) (1923–2019), English pharmacist

== See also ==
- Stuart Adams (born c. 1954), American politician
