= 1925 Memorial Cup =

Canadian junior ice hockey championship

The Memorial Cup trophy

The 1925 Memorial Cup final was the seventh junior ice hockey championship of the Canadian Amateur Hockey Association. The George Richardson Memorial Trophy champions Toronto Aura Lee of the Ontario Hockey Association in Eastern Canada competed against the Abbott Cup champions Regina Pats of the South Saskatchewan Junior Hockey League in Western Canada. In a best-of-three series, held at the Arena Gardens in Toronto, Ontario, Regina won their first Memorial Cup, defeating Toronto two games to none.

== Background ==
Regina had defeated the Saskatoon Wesleys, the University of Manitoba, and teams from Calgary and Fort William en route to the Western Canadian championship. Toronto had defeated a team from Sudbury, the Quebec Sons of Ireland, and a team from Owen Sound for the Eastern Canadian championship.

== Scores ==
This was the first Memorial Cup championship to be played under a best-of-three games series; previous versions had been a two-game, total goal series. The first game was played on March 23, 1925. Regina won it, 2-1 in overtime. The second game was held March 25, with Regina winning 5-2, also winning the Memorial Cup.

== Winning roster ==
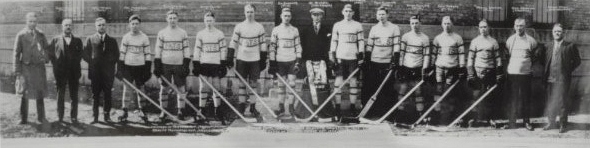
1924–25 Regina Pats team photo

Sly Acaster, Jack Crapper, Jack Cranstoun, Jack Cunning, Ken Doraty, Bert Dowie, Stan Fuller, Johnny Gottselig, Frank Ingram, Ike Morrison. Coach and Manager: Al Ritchie
