= Albert Hughes (ice hockey) =

Canadian ice hockey player

- Born: May 13, 1899 Guelph, Ontario, Canada
- Died: November 7, 1969 (aged 70) Collingwood, Ontario, Canada
- Height: 5 ft 9 in (175 cm)
- Weight: 165 lb (75 kg; 11 st 11 lb)
- Position: Centre
- Shot: Right
- Played for: New York Americans
- Playing career: 1922–1934

Albert Hughes (May 13, 1899 – November 7, 1969) was a Canadian professional ice hockey centre who played 60 games in the National Hockey League during the 1930–31 and 1931–32 seasons with the New York Americans. The rest of his career, which lasted from 1922 to 1934, was spent in various minor leagues. Hughes was born in Guelph, Ontario.

He died at a Collingwood, Ontario, hospital in 1969.

== Career statistics ==
=== Regular season and playoffs ===
			Regular season					Playoffs
Season	Team	League	GP	G	A	Pts	PIM	GP	G	A	Pts	PIM
1922–23	Hamilton Tigers	OHA Sr	10	2	0	2	2	2	0	0	0	0
1923–24	Toronto A.A. Clarke	OHA Sr	—	—	—	—	—	—	—	—	—	—
1924–25	Toronto A.A. Clarke	OHA Sr	—	—	—	—	—	—	—	—	—	—
1925–26	New York Knickerbockers	USAHA	—	—	—	—	—	—	—	—	—	—
1926–27	New York Knickerbockers	USAHA	—	—	—	—	—	—	—	—	—	—
1926–27	Niagara Falls Cataracts	Can Pro	14	2	0	2	8	—	—	—	—	—
1927–28	Niagara Falls Cataracts	Can Pro	42	20	2	22	38	—	—	—	—	—
1928–29	New Haven Eagles	Can-Am	38	8	1	9	16	2	2	0	2	4
1929–30	New Haven Eagles	Can-Am	40	22	19	41	28	—	—	—	—	—
1930–31	New York Americans	NHL	42	5	7	12	14	—	—	—	—	—
1931–32	New York Americans	NHL	18	1	1	2	8	—	—	—	—	—
1931–32	New Haven Eagles	Can-Am	25	6	8	14	8	2	0	1	1	0
1932–33	St. Louis Flyers	AHA	44	14	15	29	20	4	1	1	2	0
1933–34	St. Louis Flyers	AHA	47	3	5	8	14	7	1	1	2	0
Can-Am totals			103	36	28	64	52	4	2	1	3	4
NHL totals			60	6	8	14	22	—	—	—	—	—
