= Pittsburgh Hornets =

Ice hockey team in Pittsburgh, Pennsylvania

- City: Pittsburgh, Pennsylvania
- League: American Hockey League; IHL; Canpro
- Operated: 1936–1956; 1961–1967
- Home arena: Duquesne Gardens; Pittsburgh Civic Arena
- Colors: Columbia blue, royal blue, white (1936–1937) Red, white (1937–1952) Black, gold (1952–1954) Red, white (1954–1956, 1961–1967) Blue, gold (road uniforms, 1961–1963)
- Affiliates: Detroit Red Wings (1927–1945); Toronto Maple Leafs (1946–1956); Detroit Red Wings (1961–1967)

Franchise history
- 1927–1936: Detroit Olympics
- 1936–1956 1961–1967: Pittsburgh Hornets

Championships
- Regular season titles: 3 (1951–52, 1954–55, 1966–67)
- Division titles: 4 (1951–52, 1954–55, 1963–64, 1966–67)
- Calder Cups: 3 (1951–52, 1954–55, 1966–67)

The Pittsburgh Hornets were a minor-league professional men's ice hockey team based in Pittsburgh, Pennsylvania.

Contrary to popular belief, the Pittsburgh Hornets did not evolve from the International Hockey League's Pittsburgh Shamrocks. The franchise started play in 1927, playing their first nine seasons as the Detroit Olympics. Then on October 4, 1936, after winning the IHL championship, the Olympics moved to Pittsburgh to become the Hornets. Bill Anderson and Bill Hudson were the only two players from the Shamrocks to be on the Hornets roster at the start of the 1936–37 season.

The Hornets, still a minor-league team for the NHL's Detroit Red Wings, made their debut in the International-American Hockey League in 1936–37. The league transformed into the American Hockey League in 1940.

The Hornets disbanded after the 1955–56 season. The franchise was suspended because the archaic Duquesne Gardens was torn down. The Hornets reappeared in the new Civic Arena in 1961 and, after a poor start, they became AHL contenders again, this time as a farm club for the Detroit Red Wings. They won a division title in 1964 and won their third Calder Cup in 1967. Following the 1967 win, the Hornets permanently closed operations, as the Pittsburgh Penguins began play the next fall and took over the market when the NHL expanded.

== History ==
The team started as the Detroit Olympics in 1927 playing home games at the Detroit Olympia. The Olympics played two seasons in the Canadian Professional Hockey League (Canpro) and seven seasons in the International Hockey League (IHL) after the IHL split from Canpro in 1929. The IHL would merge with the Canadian-American Hockey League (Can-Am) in 1936 to form the International-American Hockey League. In October 1936, John Harris, a Pittsburgh theater chain owner, purchased the Olympics and relocated the team to become the Pittsburgh Hornets.

The Hornets were led by former Olympics coach Donnie Hughes. the Hornets won their first two franchise games against the Cleveland Falcons on November 7, 1936, at the Duquesne Gardens. During the 1938–39 season, Larry Aurie replaced Don Hughes as the second coach in team history. That year Don Deacon led the IAHL with 41 assists and 65 points. In 1940, the Hornets won 25 and made the playoffs and advance to the Calder Cup finals. The Hornets were originally the minor-league affiliate of the Red Wings who won the Stanley Cup in 1936. Larry Aurie, a member of that team, was a player-coach and led them to their first appearance in the Calder Cup Finals in 1940 where they were swept in three games by the Providence Reds.

At the start of the 1940–41 season, the International-American Hockey League (IAHL) became the American Hockey League (AHL). During the early 1940s, the Hornets had mediocre finishes. However, during this time frame, the team still continued to set league records. In 1942, Red Heron set an AHL record by scoring six goals in one game, which is a double hat trick. Also in 1944, Bob Gracie and Bob Walton were the AHL's top scorers with each recording 95 points in the season. Two AHL records were set on March 17, 1945: Pittsburgh and the Cleveland Barons set the mark for most goals scored in one period by netting a combined 12 goals in the third period (Pittsburgh 7, Cleveland 5). The total goals scored in the game – 22 – is also a one-game record. However, not all records set by the Hornets were positive. During the 1943–44 season the Hornets did not win one game away from the Duquesne Gardens. The winless record on the road was the first occurrence of such a feat in the history of the AHL. Following the season Larry Aurie ended his stint as coach to finish with a record of 129–162–39 in 330 games, a .450 winning percentage.

Following Aurie's departure, Max Kaminsky became the third coach of the Hornets in 1944. A year later, the Hornets became a minor-league club for the Toronto Maple Leafs ending their affiliation with the Red Wings. For the 1946–47 season the Hornets returned to the AHL Finals for the second time in team history, losing Game 7 to the mid-state Hershey Bears. The Maple Leafs' success with four Stanley Cup championships between 1947 and 1951 helped to solidify the position of the minor league Hornets. The Hornets played the Maple Leafs' style of hockey that involved hard, close checking that produced low scoring games. In 1948, the Hornets lost only 18 games, for their best record since 1938. Max Kaminsky would end his coaching career in 1947 with the Hornets. He had a .562 winning percentage. Kaminsky won 91 games, lost 68 and tied 27 in his 186 games behind the bench.

In 1948 the Hornets set the team all-time best record for goals scored in one season with 301 goals. Sid Smith became the first and only Hornets' player to score 50 goals in one season, finishing with 55 goals and 57 assists, the highest in the AHL, to earn the John B. Sollenberger Trophy for leading scorer. His 112-point total was also the highest in the league and the highest in Hornets' history.

However, in 1949 tragedy struck the team when Hornets star goaltender Baz Bastien lost his right eye after being hit by a puck in the preseason. He would later become the coach and general manager. The next year Bastien's replacement, Gil Mayer, went on to win the Harry "Hap" Holmes Memorial Award. The Hornets again made it to the Calder Cup Finals in 1951 but lost in Game 7 to the Cleveland Barons. Despite the loss, forward Bob Solinger was named MVP of playoffs with ten goals and six assists.

=== Calder Cup Champions ===
During the 1951–52 season, Pittsburgh finished first overall in the AHL, finishing with 46 wins and 95 points. The Hornets then finally won their first Calder Cup on April 20, 1952, by beating the Providence Reds in six games on a goal by Ray Hannigan during the game's second overtime at the Rhode Island Auditorium. Neither the AHL president, Maurice Podoloff, nor the Calder Cup Trophy were present when the Hornets earned the championship. They were later presented with the Cup while traveling en route to Pittsburgh. It was also during the 1951–52 season that the Hornets wore black and gold jerseys for the first time.

The Hornets would return to the Calder Cup finals the next year only to lose again in Game 7 to the Cleveland Barons. However, during the 1954–55 season Pittsburgh defeated the Buffalo Bisons in six games to capture the club's second Calder Cup Championship. The Hornets finish first overall in the regular season, the second time in team history, with 70 points. Willie Marshall won the MVP in the playoffs with an AHL-best 16 points (9 goals, 7 assists).

=== A five-year hiatus ===
The first Hornets’ team ended after the 1955–56 season. On March 31, 1956, The Hornets played their final game at the Duquesne Gardens; a 6–4 win over the Barons. The Hornets franchise was suspended for five years because of Pittsburgh's urban renewal project, Renaissance I, called for The Gardens to be torn down. Demolition started on August 13, 1956, to make way for the Park Plaza apartments and a local fixture, Stouffer's Restaurant. Today Duranti's Restaurant features the only remaining evidence of the Gardens, with 2, 11-feet wide sections of exposed red brick wall. The wall would have been the front wall of the Gardens' visiting team's dressing room. However Duranti's closed in 2008, and the bricks were removed and stored for two years. Pittsburghhockey.net, an online Pittsburgh hockey museum, donated bricks to the Pittsburgh Penguins' current arena CONSOL Energy Center for a historical display. The display contains original bricks from the Duquesne Gardens and Mellon Arena.

The Gardens would be replaced as the home rink of the city's pro hockey team as the construction of the Pittsburgh Civic Arena began in 1958, three miles to the west of the Gardens. At that time, due to the disrepair of the arena and the franchise being suspended, the city of Rochester, New York was awarded a franchise, becoming the Rochester Americans.

=== The Hornets II ===
In 1961 the franchise returned as a minor league team for the Red Wings, the Hornets emerged from five years of inactivity and played their first game at the Civic Arena, on October 14, 1961, in front of 9,317 fans. The Hornets were back but the records during the next two years gave little to cheer for.

The Hornets set many AHL records during the 1961–62 season: Most times shut out in a season (9); most games lost in a season (58) and most games lost at home (27). The team also finished in the last place in AHL, finishing with the fewest wins in team history (10) and their lowest point total in team history (22). The next season the Hornets doubled their total of wins in their second season back from returning to the AHL. However, the team established the AHL's record for the longest winless streak. The team went 0–22–1 before beating the Hershey Bears on March 26. Following the 1962–63 season, owner John Harris sold the Hornets franchise to Bruce Norris, owner of the Detroit Red Wings. The purpose of the sale, Harris said, was to provide a better team for Pittsburgh fans. Norris, by having a 100% interest in the team, will make sure better players are available to the Hornets, Harris said in announcing the sale.

Things turned around dramatically during the 1963–64 season when the Hornets won 40 games, which was more than the previous two seasons combined under the Harris ownership. Goaltender Roger Crozier won the Dudley "Red" Garrett Memorial Award for being the AHL's Rookie of the Year. Crozier also won the Harry "Hap" Holmes Memorial Award for being the best goalkeeper in the AHL. It was the eighth time in the 23-year history of the team that a Hornets' goalie won the award.

=== Final season ===
On February 8, 1966, Pittsburgh was granted an NHL franchise, which would become the Pittsburgh Penguins. To make room for the NHL, Pittsburgh's AHL franchise had to be closed. However, the Hornets would go out with a bang. On April 30, 1967, they finished the sweep of Rochester Americans in the Calder Cup Finals after Billy Harris scored:26 seconds into overtime in what would be the last goal in Pittsburgh Hornets’ history. Thirty-one years after the Hornets first game, Coach Baz Bastien and team captain Ab McDonald were presented with the Calder Cup. The Hornets were Calder Cup Champions one last time.

== Mellon Arena banner ==
On February 3, 2001, the Pittsburgh Penguins minor-league affiliate, the Wilkes-Barre/Scranton Penguins, played a tribute game at the Mellon Arena against the Cincinnati Mighty Ducks (affiliated with the Red Wings, as well as the Mighty Ducks of Anaheim at the time). The WBS Pens wore Hornets jerseys and a banner was raised inside the arena that celebrated the three Hornets’ Calder Cup Championships. The banner has since been removed from inside the Mellon Arena and arena officials aren't sure of its location.

== Logos and uniforms ==
The uniforms worn by the Hornets during their first season in Pittsburgh were Columbia blue, royal blue, and white. The team that season was sometimes nicknamed the "Blue Shirts" by the Pittsburgh Post-Gazette in its reporting. The front of the jersey featured a large circular crest with the Hornets' logo and team name. At the beginning of the second season, the team changed its colors to bright red and white. From then until 1944, the Hornets' home jerseys were red wool with a white script "P" and the word "Hornets" sewn onto them. Starting with the 1944–45 AHL season, the team wore red wool jerseys for home games with a simple, block number on front and back, and a simple crew neck collar. The 1947–48 season saw the addition of a sleeve logo featuring a hornet head wearing a hockey helmet. The road versions of these sweaters were reversed; white body with red trim. The 1948–49 jersey took this style one step further by including seven stars on each sleeve, including a star below the hornet near the cuffs. The road versions of these sweaters were reversed: white body with red trim.

In 1952, the Hornets introduced a new black and gold color scheme that was familiar with the city's baseball team and football team. The colors were not new for hockey in Pittsburgh, having been worn by the Pittsburgh Pirates of the NHL from 1925 to 1928 (before a switch to blue and gold in 1928–29) and by different incarnations of the Pittsburgh Yellow Jackets. The Hornets' home jerseys were wool. The color scheme was black with gold trim. The jerseys featured tie-down collars and the familiar hornet in a helmet on the sleeves. The road jerseys consisted of a gold body and black trim. The Hornets returned to red and white uniforms in the 1954–55 season.

When the Hornets returned to the ice in 1961 after their five-year hiatus, they wore red and white wool jerseys with tie-down collars. A full circular crest trimmed in gold replaced the familiar helmeted hornet on the sleeves. The Captain's "C" or alternate captain's "A's" were worn on the right side of the chest. The home jerseys were red with white trim and featured the stars on the sleeves again. Meanwhile, Hornets' owner, John Harris, wanted his team to have a unique jersey for road games. The result was a blue wool jersey trimmed in gold. The jersey lasted two seasons. However, there were problems with how the blue color translated on black-and-white televisions. Home teams wore darker colors and, unfortunately, the Hornets' blue jerseys looked like the dark. Rare television coverage was too confusing for viewers who couldn't see any contrast between the teams on the television.

During the final years of the franchise, the Hornets wore the same durene jerseys used by their NHL affiliate, the Detroit Red Wings, with the exception of a circular Hornets crest.

== Season-by-season results ==
- Detroit Olympics 1927–1936 (International Hockey League)
- Pittsburgh Hornets 1936–1940 (International-American Hockey League)
- Pittsburgh Hornets 1940–1956 (American Hockey League)
- Pittsburgh Hornets 1961–1967 (American Hockey League)

=== Regular season ===
"The Hornets will be a tough act to follow. We're replacing a championship winning team with a group of guys that might not be playing in the NHL if it weren't for expansion."

— Jack Riley Pittsburgh Penguins General Manager in 1967,
explaining the differences between the Penguins and the Hornets

| Season | Games | Won | Lost | Tied | Points | Winning Pct (%) | Goals for | Goals against | Standing |
|---|---|---|---|---|---|---|---|---|---|
| 1936–37 | 48 | 22 | 23 | 3 | 47 | 0.490 | 122 | 124 | 2nd, West |
| 1937–38 | 48 | 22 | 18 | 8 | 52 | 0.542 | 100 | 104 | 2nd, West |
| 1938–39 | 54 | 22 | 28 | 4 | 48 | 0.444 | 176 | 166 | 4th, West |
| 1939–40 | 56 | 25 | 22 | 9 | 59 | 0.527 | 152 | 133 | 3rd, West |
| 1940–41 | 56 | 21 | 29 | 6 | 48 | 0.429 | 156 | 170 | 3rd, West |
| 1941–42 | 56 | 23 | 28 | 5 | 51 | 0.455 | 210 | 223 | 5th, West |
| 1942–43 | 56 | 26 | 24 | 6 | 58 | 0.518 | 183 | 203 | 3rd, West |
| 1943–44 | 52 | 12 | 31 | 9 | 33 | 0.317 | 140 | 181 | 3rd, West |
| 1944–45 | 60 | 26 | 7 | 27 | 59 | 0.658 | 267 | 247 | 3rd, West |
| 1945–46 | 62 | 30 | 22 | 10 | 70 | 0.565 | 262 | 226 | 2nd, West |
| 1946–47 | 64 | 35 | 19 | 10 | 80 | 0.625 | 260 | 188 | 3rd, West |
| 1947–48 | 68 | 38 | 18 | 12 | 88 | 0.647 | 238 | 170 | 2nd, West |
| 1948–49 | 68 | 39 | 19 | 10 | 88 | 0.647 | 301 | 175 | 4th, West |
| 1949–50 | 70 | 29 | 26 | 15 | 73 | 0.521 | 215 | 185 | 4th, West |
| 1950–51 | 71 | 31 | 33 | 7 | 69 | 0.486 | 212 | 177 | 3rd, West |
| 1951–52 | 68 | 46 | 19 | 3 | 95 | 0.699 | 267 | 179 | 1st, West |
| 1952–53 | 64 | 37 | 21 | 6 | 80 | 0.625 | 223 | 149 | 2nd, AHL |
| 1953–54 | 70 | 34 | 31 | 5 | 73 | 0.521 | 250 | 222 | 4th, AHL |
| 1954–55 | 64 | 31 | 25 | 8 | 70 | 0.547 | 187 | 180 | 1st, AHL |
| 1955–56 | 64 | 43 | 17 | 4 | 90 | 0.703 | 271 | 186 | 2nd, AHL |
| Season | Games | Won | Lost | Tied | Points | Winning Pct (%) | Goals for | Goals against | Standing |
| 1961–62 | 70 | 10 | 58 | 2 | 22 | 0.157 | 177 | 367 | 4th, West |
| 1962–63 | 72 | 20 | 48 | 4 | 44 | 0.306 | 200 | 317 | 4th, West |
| 1963–64 | 72 | 40 | 29 | 3 | 83 | 0.576 | 242 | 196 | 1st, West |
| 1964–65 | 72 | 29 | 36 | 7 | 65 | 0.451 | 228 | 256 | 3rd, West |
| 1965–66 | 72 | 38 | 33 | 1 | 77 | 0.535 | 236 | 218 | 3rd, West |
| 1966–67 | 72 | 41 | 21 | 10 | 92 | 0.639 | 282 | 209 | 1st, West |

=== Playoffs ===
| Season | 1st round | 2nd round | Finals |
|---|---|---|---|
| 1936–37 | bye | L, 2–3 Syracuse | |
| 1937–38 | L 0–2 Syracuse | | |
| 1938–39 | Out of playoffs. | | |
| 1939–40 | W, 2–1, Springfield | W, 2–1, Hershey | L, 0–3, Providence |
| 1940–41 | W, 2–1, Springfield | L, 1–2, Hershey | — |
| 1941–42 | Out of playoffs. | | |
| 1942–43 | L, 0–2, Indianapolis | — | — |
| 1943–44 | Out of playoffs. | | |
| 1944–45 | Out of playoffs. | | |
| 1945–46 | W, 2–1, Hershey | L, 1–2, Cleveland | — |
| 1946–47 | W, 2–1, New Haven | W, 2–0, Buffalo | L, 3–4, Hershey |
| 1947–48 | L, 0–2, New Haven | — | — |
| 1948–49 | Out of playoffs. | | |
| 1949–50 | Out of playoffs. | | |
| 1950–51 | W, 3–0, Springfield | W, 3–0, Hershey | L, 3–4, Cleveland |
| 1951–52 | W, 4–1, Hershey | bye | W, 4–2, Providence |
| 1952–53 | W, 3–0, Hershey | — | L, 3–4, Cleveland |
| 1953–54 | L, 2–3, Hershey | — | — |
| 1954–55 | W, 3–1, Springfield | — | W, 4–2, Buffalo |
| 1955–56 | L, 1–3, Cleveland | — | — |
| Season | 1st round | 2nd round | Finals |
| 1961–62 | Out of playoffs | | |
| 1962–63 | Out of playoffs | | |
| 1963–64 | L, 1–4, Quebec | — | — |
| 1964–65 | L, 1–3, Buffalo | — | — |
| 1965–66 | L, 0–3, Cleveland | — | — |
| 1966–67 | W, 4–1, Hershey | bye | W, 4–0, Rochester |

== Franchise leaders ==
Goals: 130 (John "Peanuts" O'Flaherty, 1940–50 and Bob Solinger, 1949–56)

Assists: 253 (Frank Mathers, 1948–56)

Points: 319 (John "Peanuts" O'Flaherty, 1940–50)

PIM: 442 (Pete Backor, 1945–54)

== Hall of Famers ==
Player

- Sid Abel 1969
- George Armstrong 1975
- Marty Barry 1965
- Andy Bathgate 1978
- Leo Boivin 1986
- Gerry Cheevers 1985
- Fernie Flaman 1996
- Doug Harvey 1973
- Tim Horton 1977
- Jack Stewart 1964

Builder

- Frank Mathers 1992 Coach
- Bill Torrey 1995 General manager

Other

- Howie Meeker 1998 Pittsburgh Hornets Broadcaster
- John Ashley 1981 On-ice Official
