= 1932–33 IHL season =

North American ice hockey season

The 1932–33 IHL season was the fourth season of the International Hockey League, a minor professional ice hockey league in the Midwestern and Eastern United States and Canada. Six teams participated in the league and the Buffalo Bisons won the championship.

== Regular season ==
	GP	W	L	T	GF	GA	Pts
London Tecumsehs	44	27	9	8	111	66	62
Buffalo Bisons	44	26	12	6	128	70	58
Syracuse Stars	44	23	15	6	136	119	52
Windsor Bulldogs	44	16	22	6	87	120	38
Cleveland Indians	42	10	27	5	100	147	25
Detroit Olympics	42	10	27	5	75	115	25

== Playoffs ==
Date	Visiting team	Home team
March 15	Syracuse 3	Windsor 1
March 16	Buffalo 2	London 0
March 19	London 4	Syracuse 4
March 19	Windsor 1	Buffalo 3
March 21	Buffalo 6	Windsor 1
March 23	Syracuse 0	London 1
March 25	London 0	Buffalo 1
March 26	Windsor 3	Syracuse 2
March 29	London 2	Windsor 3
March 29	Syracuse 0	Buffalo 2
March 31	Windsor 1	London 2
April 2	Buffalo 1	Syracuse 5

Playoffs	GP	W	L	T	GF	GA	Pts
Buffalo Bisons	6	5	1	0	15	7	10
Syracuse Stars	6	2	3	1	14	12	5
London Tecumsehs	6	2	3	1	9	11	5
Windsor Bulldogs	6	2	4	0	10	18	4
