= Rochester Cardinals =

- City: Rochester, New York
- League: International Hockey League
- Conference: Eastern
- Founded: 1935
- Operated: 1935–1936
- Home arena: Edgerton Park Arena
- Affiliates: New York Americans (NHL)

The Rochester Cardinals were a professional ice hockey team that was a member of the International Hockey League. The Cardinals, who played at Edgerton Park Arena, lasted only the 1935–36 season, compiling a 15–29–3 record and a host of financial difficulties.

The Cardinals were a farm team of the New York Americans of the National Hockey League. Rochester could have been a charter member of the International-American Hockey League which formed in the summer of 1936 upon the merger of the IHL and the Canadian-American Hockey Leagues. However, the Cardinals went into receivership before the end of the 1935–36 season and no suitable owner could be found to operate the team.

After a new arena was constructed Rochester was awarded the Rochester Americans.
