= Cleveland Falcons =

- City: Cleveland, Ohio
- League: International-American; Hockey League
- Operated: 1934–1937
- Home arena: Elysium Arena

Franchise history
- 1929–1934: Cleveland Indians
- 1934–1937: Cleveland Falcons
- 1937–1973: Cleveland Barons
- 1973–1974: Jacksonville Barons
- 1974–1975: Syracuse Eagles

The Cleveland Falcons were a professional ice hockey team in Cleveland, Ohio, that played home games in the Elysium Arena. The team was founded in 1929, as the Cleveland Indians as a member of the International Hockey League, where they played for five seasons, then renamed the Falcons. In 1936, the team transferred to the International-American Hockey League along with three other teams from the International Hockey League. After playing the 1936–37 season in the new league, they were renamed the Cleveland Barons, for the 1937–38 season.

== Season-by-season results ==
- Cleveland Falcons 1934–1936 (International Hockey League)
- Cleveland Falcons 1936–1937 (International-American Hockey League)

Season	Games	Won	Lost	Tied	Points	Goals for	Goals against	Standing	Playoffs
1934–35	44	20	23	1	40	115	132	4th, IHL	L, 0-2, London
1935–36	48	25	19	4	54	149	146	2nd, West	L, 1-3, Buffalo
1936–37	48	13	27	8	34	113	152	3rd, West	Data unavailable
