= 1934–35 IHL season =

North American ice hockey season

The 1934–35 IHL season was the sixth season of the International Hockey League, a minor professional ice hockey league in the Midwestern and Eastern United States and Canada. Six teams participated in the league, and the Detroit Olympics won the championship.

== Regular season ==
| | GP | W | L | T | GF | GA | Pts |
|---|---|---|---|---|---|---|---|
| Detroit Olympics | 44 | 21 | 15 | 8 | 116 | 88 | 42 |
| London Tecumsehs | 44 | 21 | 17 | 6 | 98 | 110 | 42 |
| Syracuse Stars | 44 | 20 | 20 | 4 | 128 | 118 | 40 |
| Buffalo Bisons | 44 | 20 | 18 | 6 | 113 | 100 | 40 |
| Cleveland Falcons | 44 | 20 | 23 | 1 | 115 | 132 | 40 |
| Windsor Bulldogs | 44 | 14 | 23 | 7 | 94 | 116 | 28 |

== Playoffs ==
=== Semifinals ===
Best of 3

| Date | Visiting team | Home team |
|---|---|---|
| March 19 | Syracuse 1 | Detroit 4 |
| March 21 | Detroit 3 | Syracuse 1 |

Detroit Olympics beat Syracuse Stars 2 wins to none,

| Date | Visiting team | Home team |
|---|---|---|
| March 19 | Cleveland 4 | London 5 |
| March 21 | London 1 | Cleveland 0 |

London Tecumsehs beat Cleveland Falcons 2 wins to none.

=== Final ===
Best of 5

| Date | Visiting team | Home team |
|---|---|---|
| March 24 | London 0 | Detroit 4 |
| March 26 | Detroit 2 | London 1 |
| March 28 | London 1 | Detroit 2 |

Detroit Olympics beat London Tecumsehs 3 wins to none and won the league championship.
