= 1933–34 IHL season =

North American ice hockey season

The 1933–34 IHL season was the fifth season of the International Hockey League, a minor professional ice hockey league in the Midwestern and Eastern United States and Canada. Six teams participated in the league, and the London Tecumsehs won the championship.

== Regular season ==
	GP	W	L	T	GF	GA	Pts
Detroit Olympics	44	23	16	5	104	98	51
Buffalo Bisons	44	20	13	11	90	66	51
London Tecumsehs	44	18	17	9	92	80	45
Syracuse Stars	44	19	21	4	114	120	42
Windsor Bulldogs	44	18	23	3	84	103	39
Cleveland Indians	44	16	24	4	104	121	36

== Playoffs ==
=== Final ===
Round Robin

Date	Visiting team	Home team
March 18	Buffalo 2	Syracuse 1
March 20	London 2	Detroit 3
March 22	Syracuse 1	Detroit 5
March 22	Buffalo 2	London 3
March 24	London 2	Buffalo 1
March 25	London 4	Syracuse 2
March 25	Buffalo 1	Detroit 5
March 27	Syracuse 1	London 5
March 27	Detroit 3	Buffalo 6
March 30	Detroit 0	London 4
March 31	Syracuse 3	Buffalo 1
April 1	Detroit 2	Syracuse 3

Round Robin Playoffs	GP	W	L	T	GF	GA	Pts
London Tecumsehs	6	5	1	0	20	9	10
Detroit Olympics	6	3	3	0	18	17	6
Buffalo Bisons	6	2	4	0	13	17	4
Syracuse Stars	6	2	4	0	11	19	4
