= Philadelphia Arrows =

American ice hockey team (1927–1941)

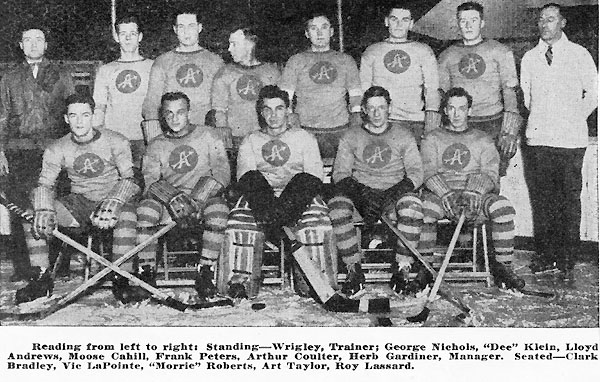
1929-30 Philadelphia Arrows (C-AHL)

The Philadelphia Arrows was a professional ice hockey team that played in Philadelphia, Pennsylvania.

== History ==
Founded in 1927, the club was Philadelphia's first professional hockey team and played in the Canadian-American Hockey League. The team changed its name to the Philadelphia Ramblers beginning with the 1935–36 season when it became affiliated with the National Hockey League's New York Rangers. The following season the Ramblers and the C-AHL began playing an interlocking schedule with the International Hockey League for two seasons before the two circuits formally merged to form a new International American Hockey League (renamed the American Hockey League in 1940) in June 1938. The Ramblers continued to play in this league until folding in 1941.

The Arrows'/Ramblers' coach and manager from 1929 to 1941 was Hall of Fame defenseman and Hart Trophy winner Herb Gardiner. Members of the Arrows included future Hart Trophy winner Tommy Anderson, and future Chicago Black Hawks defenceman Art Coulter.

When the NHL's Pittsburgh Pirates moved to Philadelphia in 1930 as the Philadelphia Quakers, the team lasted only one season due in part to the fact that the Arrows out-drew it in attendance as well as the NHL club's poor performance on the ice, winning just four games (4-36-4) of their 44-game schedule.

The Arrows played at the Philadelphia Arena.
