= Buffalo Bisons (IHL) =

Former professional ice hockey team in Buffalo, New York from 1928 to 1936

- City: Fort Erie, Ontario, Canada
- League: International Hockey League
- Operated: 1928–1936
- Home arena: Peace Bridge Arena
- Colors: Orange, black, white

Championships
- Regular season titles: 2:(1930–31, 1931–32)
- Playoff championships: 2: (1931–32, 1932–33)

The Buffalo Bisons were a professional ice hockey team representing Buffalo, New York, although they played home games in nearby Fort Erie, Ontario, Canada, at the 5,000-seat Peace Bridge Arena.

== History ==
The Bisons were founded in the Canadian Professional Hockey League for the 1928–29 season. The Bisons transferred to the International Hockey League for the next season. Buffalo were IHL league champions in 1931–32 and 1932–33, winning the F. G. "Teddy" Oke Trophy.

On March 17, 1936, with just nine days left in the season, the Bisons lost their home arena due to damage caused by thirteen inches of wet snow deposited by an early Spring storm. The arena (only eight years old at the time) was designed with a "Lamella Trussless" roof to improve indoor sightlines, and reduce support frames obstructing the view. The structure proved to be too weak and collapsed under the weight of the snow. The Bisons played the remainder of the 1935–36 season on the road. The arena was torn down and later replaced by Fort Erie Memorial Arena (c. 1947 and demolished 1977).

The Bisons joined the International-American Hockey League for the 1936–37 season. The team started the season playing in an arena (likely Victoria Park Arena) in Niagara Falls, Ontario. It soon became clear that they wouldn't be able to make a profit and pay players' salaries from ticket sales in the smaller facility. The club permanently ceased operations on December 6, 1936, after playing just eleven games with a record of 3–8–0.

The original Bisons were replaced in 1940 when the Syracuse Stars relocated to Buffalo, becoming the new Bisons team, after the construction of Buffalo Memorial Auditorium on the American side of the border. The new Bisons played from 1940 to 1970, when the current Buffalo Sabres were founded.

== Season-by-season results ==
- Buffalo Bisons 1928–1929 (Canadian Professional Hockey League)
- Buffalo Bisons 1929–1936 (International Hockey League)
- Buffalo Bisons 1936 (International-American Hockey League)

=== Regular season ===
Season	Games	Won	Lost	Tied	Points	Goals for	Goals against	Standing
1928–29	42	17	18	7	41	89	72	5th, CPHL
1929–30	42	26	12	4	56	102	67	2nd, IHL
1930–31	48	30	13	5	65	115	76	1st, IHL
1931–32	48	25	14	9	59	106	80	1st, IHL
1932–33	44	26	12	6	58	128	70	2nd, IHL
1933–34	44	20	13	11	51	90	66	2nd, IHL
1934–35	44	20	18	6^{†}	40	113	100	3rd, IHL
1935–36	48	22	20	6	50	109	101	2nd, IHL
1936–37	11	3	8	0	6	23	30	disbanded

^{†} Points not awarded for tied games during 1934–35 International Hockey League season.

=== Playoffs ===
Season	1st round	2nd round	Finals
1928–29	Out of playoffs		
1929–30	—	W, 2-1, Detroit	L, 1-3, Cleveland
1930–31	2nd place in double round robin.		
1931–32	1st place in double round robin. Champions		
1932–33	1st place in double round robin. Champions		
1933–34	3rd place in double round robin.		
1934–35	Out of playoffs		
1935–36	W, 3-1, Cleveland	L, 1-2, Windsor	—
1936–37	Did not complete season.		
