= Detroit Olympics =

- City: Detroit, Michigan
- League: Canadian Professional Hockey League 1927–29, International Hockey League; 1929–36
- Operated: 1927 to 1936
- Home arena: Detroit Olympia
- Colors: Red, White
- Affiliates: Detroit Red Wings

Franchise history
- 1927 to 1936: Detroit Olympics
- 1936 to 1956 1961 to 1967: Pittsburgh Hornets

Championships
- Regular season titles: 3 1933–34, 1934–35, 1935–36
- IHL Titles: 2 1934–35, 1935–36

The Detroit Olympics were a minor league hockey team located in Detroit, Michigan that was a member of the Canadian Professional Hockey League 1927–29 and the International Hockey League 1929–36. The team played all of their home games at the Detroit Olympia. On October 4, 1936, after winning the IHL championship, the Olympics moved to Pittsburgh to become the Pittsburgh Hornets.
