= 1935–36 IHL season =

North American ice hockey season

The 1935–36 IHL season was the seventh and final season of the International Hockey League, a minor professional ice hockey league in the Midwestern and Eastern United States and Canada. Eight teams participated in the league, and the Detroit Olympics won the championship.

== Regular season ==
=== Eastern Division ===
	GP	W	L	T	GF	GA	Pts
Syracuse Stars	48	26	19	3	167	130	55
Buffalo Bisons	48	22	20	6	109	101	50
London Tecumsehs	48	23	22	3	116	125	49
Rochester Cardinals	47	15	29	3	104	137	33

=== Western Division ===
	GP	W	L	T	GF	GA	Pts
Detroit Olympics	47	26	18	3	127	101	55
Cleveland Falcons	48	25	19	4	149	146	54
Windsor Bulldogs	48	18	19	11	121	120	47
Pittsburgh Shamrocks	46	18	27	1	137	170	37

== Playoffs ==
=== Quarterfinals ===
2 games total goals

Date	Visiting team	Home team
March 26	Buffalo 0	Cleveland 1
March 29	Cleveland 1	Buffalo 3

Buffalo beat Cleveland 3 goals to 2.

Date	Visiting team	Home team
March 27	London 3	Windsor 3
March 30	Windsor 1	London 0

Windsor beat London 4 goals to 3.

=== Semifinals ===
Best of 5

Date	Visiting team	Home team
March 24	Syracuse 2	Detroit 4
March 26	Syracuse 1	Detroit 2
March 29	Detroit 2	Syracuse 1

Detroit beat Syracuse 3 wins to none.

Best of 3

Date	Visiting team	Home team
April 1	Buffalo 1	Windsor 2
April 2	Windsor 0	Buffalo 1
April 4	Windsor 2	Buffalo 0

Windsor beat Buffalo 2 wins to 1.

=== Final ===
Best of 5

Date	Visiting team	Home team
April 8	Windsor 1	Detroit 8
April 10	Detroit 4	Windsor 3
April 12	Windsor 0	Detroit 1

Detroit beat Windsor 3 wins to none.
