= International Hockey League (1929–1936) =

Canadian-American minor pro hockey league

The International Hockey League (IHL) was a professional hockey league operating in Canada and the United States from 1929 to 1936. It is one of two direct ancestors of the American Hockey League.

It was formed when the Canadian Professional Hockey League (CPHL) split into two leagues. The larger teams formed the IHL, which was one step below the National Hockey League. The smaller teams kept the CPHL name, and served as a farm system for the IHL for one season.

Three teams folded and two others merged after the 1935–36 season, leaving the IHL with only four teams—the minimum required for the league to be viable. The remaining teams joined with the Canadian-American Hockey League (Can-Am League), which had also been cut down to four teams, to form a "circuit of mutual convenience" called the International-American Hockey League (IAHL). The two leagues played an interlocking schedule for the next two years, with the IHL serving as the IAHL's Western Division and the Can-Am League serving as its Eastern Division. The Buffalo Bisons, a charter IHL member, suspended operations due to an arena collapse and subsequent financial problems after only 11 games, and the IAHL played as a seven-team unit for the rest of the season and all of the 1938–39 season.

At a meeting held in New York City on June 28, 1938, the two leagues formally merged into a unified league operating under the IAHL name. The Eastern Amateur Hockey League's Hershey Bears were added as an expansion team, replacing the Bisons. The IAHL changed its name to the American Hockey League in 1940.

== Teams ==
Team	Years	Notes
Buffalo Bisons	1929–1936	transferred from CPHL, later joined IAHL
Cleveland Falcons	1934–1936	Former Cleveland Indians franchise, later joined IAHL
Cleveland Indians	1929–1934	Former Kitchener CPHL franchise, players from Toronto of the CPHL, renamed Falcons in 1934
Detroit Olympics	1929–1936	transferred from CPHL, merged with Shamrocks to form Pittsburgh Hornets of IAHL
Hamilton Tigers	1929–1930	transferred from CPHL, moved to Syracuse
London Panthers/Tecumsehs	1929–1936	transferred from CPHL, disbanded when IHL disbanded
Niagara Falls Cataracts	1929–1930	transferred from CPHL
Pittsburgh Shamrocks	1935–1936	merged with Olympics to form Pittsburgh Hornets of IAHL
Pittsburgh Yellowjackets	1930–1932	
Rochester Cardinals	1935–1936	disbanded when IHL disbanded
Syracuse Stars	1930–1936	purchase and transfer of Hamilton Tigers, later joined IAHL
Toronto Millionaires	1929–1930	transferred from CPHL, players from Kitchener of CPHL
Windsor Bulldogs	1929–1936	transferred from CPHL, disbanded when IHL disbanded

== See also ==
- List of ice hockey leagues
