= Gus Mancuso (ice hockey) =

Canadian ice hockey player (1914–2003)

- Born: April 11, 1914 Niagara Falls, Ontario, Canada
- Died: August 16, 2003 (aged 89) Mission Viejo, California, U.S.
- Height: 5 ft 7 in (170 cm)
- Weight: 160 lb (73 kg; 11 st 6 lb)
- Position: Right wing
- Shot: Right
- Played for: Montreal Canadiens; New York Rangers
- Playing career: 1933–1949

Felix Anthony "Gus" Mancuso (April 11, 1914 – August 16, 2003) was a Canadian professional ice hockey forward who played 47 games in the National Hockey League for the Montreal Canadiens and New York Rangers between 1937 and 1943, when he left the league to serve in World War II. The rest of his career, which lasted from 1933 to 1949, was spent in various minor leagues.

He died in California in 2003.

== Career statistics ==
=== Regular season and playoffs ===
			Regular season					Playoffs
Season	Team	League	GP	G	A	Pts	PIM	GP	G	A	Pts	PIM
1930–31	Niagara Falls Cataracts	OHA	3	1	2	3	0	—	—	—	—	—
1931–32	Niagara Falls Cataracts	OHA	4	1	0	1	2	5	3	0	3	2
1932–33	Niagara Falls Cataracts	OHA	4	6	1	7	4	2	1	0	1	0
1932–33	Niagara Falls Cataracts	M-Cup	—	—	—	—	—	3	5	2	7	4
1933–34	Niagara Falls Cataracts	OHA Sr	24	9	1	10	20	2	0	0	0	0
1934–35	Hershey B'ars	EAHL	21	16	5	21	31	9	6	4	10	4
1935–36	Hershey B'ars	EAHL	40	24	12	36	37	8	3	0	3	18
1936–37	Hershey Bears	EAHL	48	14	14	28	17	4	1	0	1	2
1937–38	Montreal Canadiens	NHL	17	1	1	2	4	—	—	—	—	—
1937–38	New Haven Eagles	IAHL	32	6	4	10	17	2	0	1	1	0
1938–39	Montreal Canadiens	NHL	2	0	0	0	0	—	—	—	—	—
1938–39	New Haven Eagles	IAHL	42	4	14	18	47	—	—	—	—	—
1939–40	Montreal Canadiens	NHL	7	0	0	0	6	—	—	—	—	—
1939–40	New Haven Eagles	IAHL	47	9	20	29	41	3	0	1	1	0
1940–41	New Haven Eagles	AHL	56	17	25	42	12	2	0	0	0	2
1941–42	New Haven Eagles	AHL	46	19	29	48	24	2	0	0	0	0
1942–43	New York Rangers	NHL	21	6	8	14	13	—	—	—	—	—
1942–43	New Haven Eagles	AHL	30	10	16	26	13	—	—	—	—	—
1945–46	Providence Reds	AHL	15	3	5	8	4	—	—	—	—	—
1945–46	Hollywood Wolves	PCHL	6	2	4	6	0	9	3	2	5	10
1946–47	Hollywood Wolves	PCHL	59	27	17	44	33	7	1	1	2	9
1947–48	Los Angeles Monarchs	PCHL	51	17	15	32	15	4	0	2	2	2
1948–49	Los Angeles Monarchs	PCHL	22	3	3	6	11	—	—	—	—	—
IAHL/AHL totals			268	68	113	181	158	9	0	2	2	2
NHL totals			47	7	9	16	23	—	—	—	—	—
