= Doug Jackson (ice hockey) =

Canadian ice hockey player

- Born: December 12, 1924 Winnipeg, Manitoba, Canada
- Died: April 26, 1980 (aged 55) Kingston, Ontario, Canada
- Height: 5 ft 10 in (178 cm)
- Weight: 150 lb (68 kg; 10 st 10 lb)
- Position: Goaltender
- Caught: Left
- Played for: Chicago Black Hawks
- Playing career: 1945–1952

Douglas Jackson (December 12, 1924 – April 26, 1980) was a Canadian professional ice hockey goaltender who played six games in the National Hockey League with the Chicago Black Hawks during the 1947–48 season. The rest of his career, which lasted from 1945 to 1952, was spent in the minor leagues. Jackson served in the Canadian Army from 1944 to 1945.

== Career statistics ==
=== Regular season and playoffs ===
			Regular season								Playoffs
Season	Team	League	GP	W	L	T	Min	GA	SO	GAA	GP	W	L	Min	GA	SO	GAA
1938–39	Winnipeg Excelsiors	MAHA	17	—	—	—	1020	51	6	3.00	—	—	—	—	—	—	—
1939–40	Winnipeg Excelsiors	MAHA	—	—	—	—	—	—	—	—	—	—	—	—	—	—	—
1940–41	Winnipeg Rangers	MJHL	—	—	—	—	—	—	—	—	—	—	—	—	—	—	—
1941–42	Winnipeg Rangers	MJHL	2	—	—	—	120	13	0	6.50	—	—	—	—	—	—	—
1941–42	Winnipeg Rangers	M-Cup	—	—	—	—	—	—	—	—	13	10	3	780	62	0	4.77
1942–43	Winnipeg Rangers	MJHL	13	—	—	—	780	51	0	3.92	6	—	—	360	23	0	3.83
1943–44	Montreal Juniors	QJAHA	2	2	0	0	120	5	0	2.50	4	4	0	240	11	0	2.75
1945–46	Kansas City Pla-Mors	USHL	52	—	—	—	3120	169	2	3.25	12	8	4	720	33	—	2.75
1946–47	Kansas City Pla-Mors	USHL	54	26	17	11	3240	177	3	3.27	12	10	2	720	21	1	1.75
1947–48	Chicago Black Hawks	NHL	6	1	4	1	360	42	0	7.00	—	—	—	—	—	—	—
1947–48	Kansas City Pla-Mors	USHL	59	32	25	2	3540	220	4	3.72	7	3	4	434	23	0	3.18
1948–49	Vancouver Canucks	PCHL	66	31	29	6	3960	241	1	3.65	3	0	3	203	14	0	4.14
1949–50	Los Angeles Monarchs	PCHL	8	4	2	2	480	38	0	4.75	—	—	—	—	—	—	—
1949–50	San Francisco Shamrocks	PCHL	5	1	2	3	300	20	0	4.00	—	—	—	—	—	—	—
1949–50	Victoria Cougars	PCHL	1	0	1	0	60	11	0	11.00	—	—	—	—	—	—	—
1951–52	Nanaimo Clippers	BCIHA	41	—	—	—	2460	147	1	3.65	6	4	2	360	19	0	3.17
NHL totals			6	1	4	1	360	42	0	7.00	—	—	—	—	—	—	—
