= Jack Howard (ice hockey) =

Canadian ice hockey player (1909–1983)

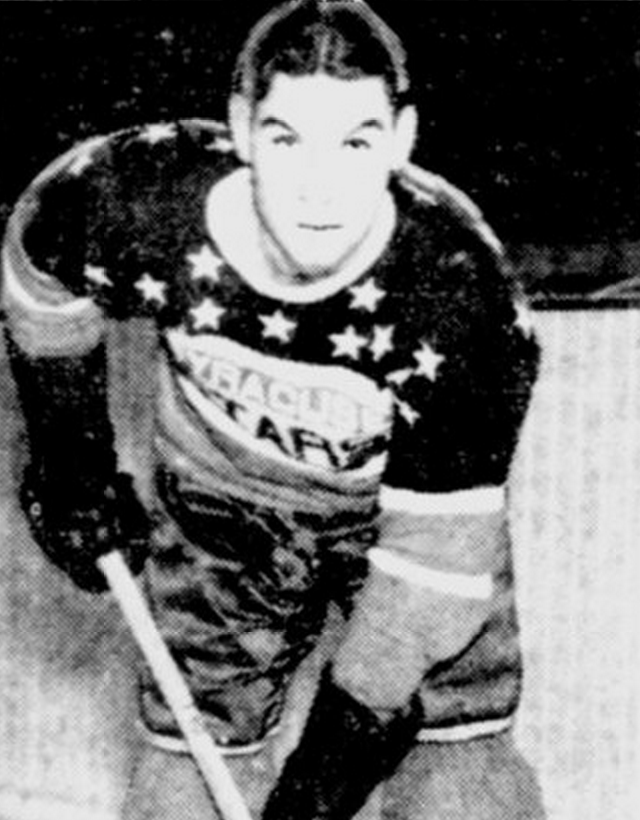
- Born: October 15, 1909 London, Ontario, Canada
- Died: September 14, 1983 (aged 73) Cambridge, Ontario, Canada
- Height: 6 ft 0 in (183 cm)
- Weight: 190 lb (86 kg; 13 st 8 lb)
- Position: Defence
- Shot: Left
- Played for: Toronto Maple Leafs
- Playing career: 1933–1945

John Francis Howard (October 15, 1909 – September 14, 1983) was a Canadian professional ice hockey player who played two games in the National Hockey League for the Toronto Maple Leafs during the 1936–37 season. The rest of his career, which lasted from 1933 to 1945, was spent in various minor leagues. He was born in London, Ontario. He died at Memorial Hospital in Cambridge, Ontario in 1983.

== Career statistics ==
=== Regular season and playoffs ===
			Regular season					Playoffs
Season	Team	League	GP	G	A	Pts	PIM	GP	G	A	Pts	PIM
1931–32	Hamilton Patricias	OSRB	—	—	—	—	—	—	—	—	—	—
1932–33	Hamilton Patricias	OSHA-B	—	—	—	—	—	—	—	—	—	—
1932–33	Hamilton Patricias	Al-Cup	—	—	—	—	—	6	3	0	3	6
1933–34	Hamilton Tigers	OHA Sr	23	5	1	6	28	4	0	1	1	2
1933–34	Hamilton Tigers	Al-Cup	—	—	—	—	—	8	2	0	2	16
1934–35	Hamilton Tigers	OHA Sr	20	6	6	12	41	6	2	1	3	6
1935–36	Syracuse Stars	IHL	48	5	6	11	48	3	0	0	0	0
1936–37	Toronto Maple Leafs	NHL	2	0	0	0	0	—	—	—	—	—
1936–37	Syracuse Stars	IAHL	48	6	9	15	46	9	2	0	2	2
1937–38	Syracuse Stars	IAHL	47	6	9	15	32	8	0	3	3	4
1938–39	Syracuse Stars	IAHL	23	1	0	1	10	—	—	—	—	—
1939–40	St. Louis Flyers	AHA	45	9	5	14	18	5	0	2	2	2
1940–41	St. Louis Flyers	AHA	8	0	1	1	10	—	—	—	—	—
1940–41	Springfield Indians	AHL	12	0	3	3	14	—	—	—	—	—
1940–41	Pittsburgh Hornets	AHL	24	0	5	5	10	6	0	0	0	8
1941–42	Pittsburgh Hornets	AHL	55	6	13	19	10	—	—	—	—	—
1942–43	Pittsburgh Hornets	AHL	54	1	16	17	12	2	0	2	2	4
1943–44	Pittsburgh Hornets	AHL	38	3	12	15	16	—	—	—	—	—
1944–45	Pittsburgh Hornets	AHL	26	1	6	7	16	—	—	—	—	—
1944–45	Pasadena Panthers	PCHL	3	0	1	1	4	—	—	—	—	—
1944–45	Los Angeles Monarchs	PCHL	—	—	—	—	—	2	0	1	1	0
IAHL/AHL totals			327	24	73	97	166	25	2	5	7	18
NHL totals			2	0	0	0	0	—	—	—	—	—
