= Hec Highton =

Canadian ice hockey player

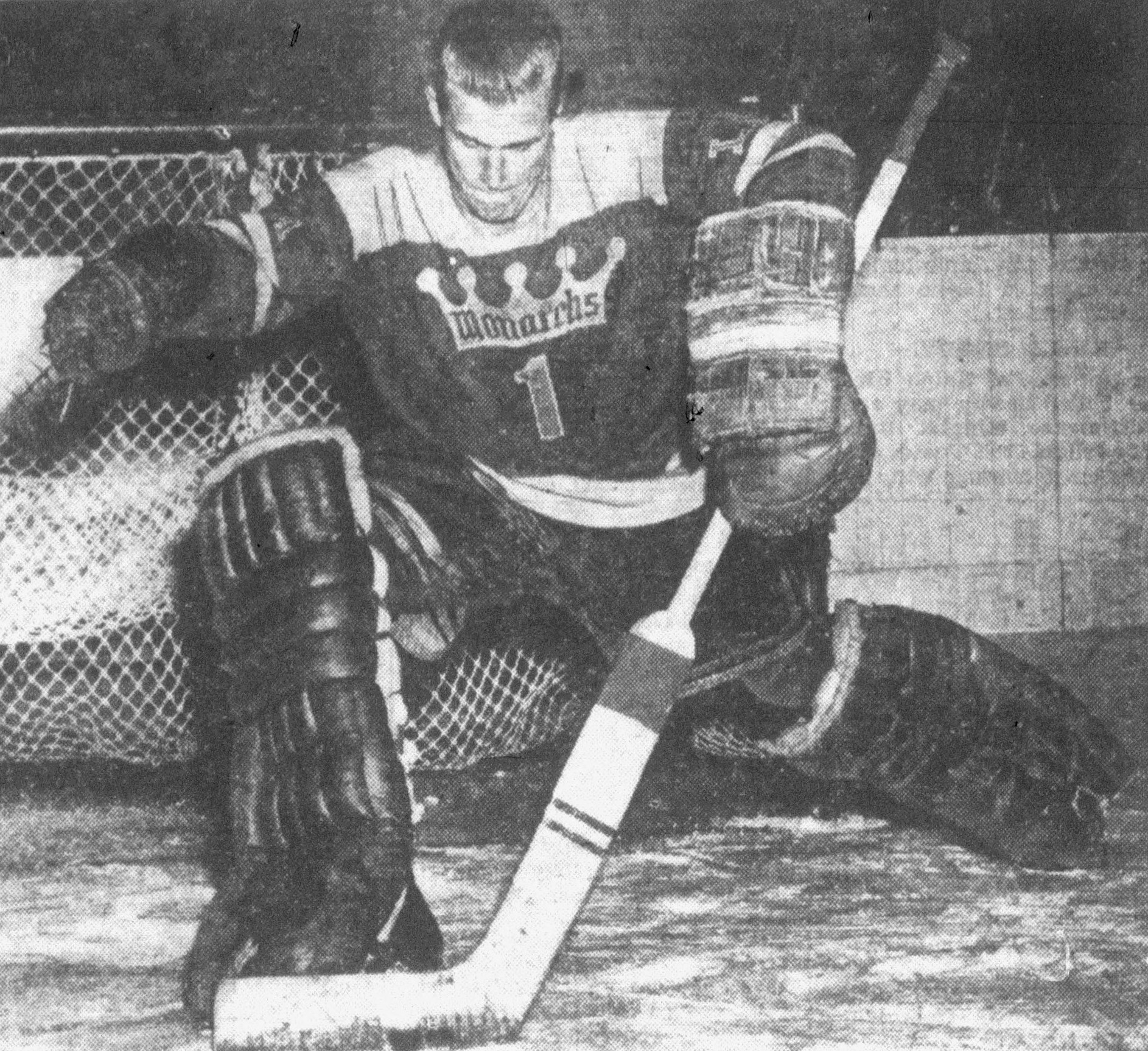
- Highton, circa 1949
- Born: December 10, 1923 Medicine Hat, Alberta, Canada
- Died: September 28, 1985 (aged 61) Los Angeles, California, U.S.
- Height: 6 ft 0 in (183 cm)
- Weight: 175 lb (79 kg; 12 st 7 lb)
- Position: Goaltender
- Caught: Right
- Played for: Chicago Black Hawks
- Playing career: 1943–1951

Hector Salisbury Highton (December 10, 1923 – September 28, 1985) was a Canadian professional ice hockey goaltender who played twenty-four games in the National Hockey League with the Chicago Black Hawks during the 1943–44 season. On January 7, 1944, he was sent to the Providence Reds of the American Hockey League with Gord Buttrey and $10,000 for goaltender Mike Karakas. He retired in 1951 after a stint with the Pacific Coast Hockey League.

== Career statistics ==
=== Regular season and playoffs ===
			Regular season								Playoffs
Season	Team	League	GP	W	L	T	Min	GA	SO	GAA	GP	W	L	Min	GA	SO	GAA
1940–41	Spokane Bombers	PCHL	—	—	—	—	—	—	—	—	1	0	1	60	5	0	5.00
1942–43	New Westminster Spitfires	PCHL	10	—	—	—	600	33	1	3.30	3	1	2	190	18	0	5.68
1943–44	Chicago Black Hawks	NHL	24	10	14	0	1440	108	0	4.50	—	—	—	—	—	—	—
1943–44	Providence Reds	AHL	27	5	21	1	1620	125	0	4.62	—	—	—	—	—	—	—
1944–45	Providence Reds	AHL	4	0	4	0	240	29	0	7.25	—	—	—	—	—	—	—
1944–45	St. Louis Flyers	AHL	26	7	15	4	1560	118	0	4.54	—	—	—	—	—	—	—
1945–46	St. Louis Flyers	AHL	52	20	24	8	3120	215	1	4.13	—	—	—	—	—	—	—
1946–47	St. Louis Flyers	AHL	59	16	32	11	3540	257	0	4.36	—	—	—	—	—	—	—
1947–48	St. Louis Flyers	AHL	65	21	34	10	3900	278	0	4.28	—	—	—	—	—	—	—
1948–49	Los Angeles Monarchs	PCHL	70	28	33	9	4200	271	1	3.87	7	4	3	434	25	0	3.46
1949–50	Los Angeles Monarchs	PCHL	62	26	28	8	3720	209	3	3.37	17	10	7	1032	50	3	2.91
1950–51	Victoria Cougars	PCHL	19	7	8	4	1140	68	0	3.58	—	—	—	—	—	—	—
1950–51	Vancouver Canucks	PCHL	48	13	21	13	2860	173	3	3.63	—	—	—	—	—	—	—
1950–51	Portland Eagles	PCHL	—	—	—	—	—	—	—	—	7	3	4	480	20	1	2.50
AHL totals			233	69	130	34	13,980	1022	0	4.39	—	—	—	—	—	—	—
NHL totals			24	10	14	0	1440	108	0	4.50	—	—	—	—	—	—	—
