= Gordon Buttrey =

Canadian ice hockey player

- Born: March 17, 1926 Regina, Saskatchewan, Canada
- Died: January 3, 2012 (aged 85) Edmonton, Alberta, Canada
- Height: 6 ft 0 in (183 cm)
- Weight: 185 lb (84 kg; 13 st 3 lb)
- Position: Right wing
- Shot: Right
- Played for: Chicago Black Hawks
- Playing career: 1943–1956

Gordon Roy Buttrey (March 17, 1926 – January 3, 2012) was a Canadian professional ice hockey right wing who played ten games in the National Hockey League with the Chicago Black Hawks during the 1943–44 season. He was traded with Hec Highton and cash to bring goalie Mike Karakas back to Chicago. Buttrey spent most of his career, which lasted from 1943 to 1956, in the minor leagues. He was born in Regina, Saskatchewan, but grew up in Edmonton, Alberta.

== Career statistics ==
=== Regular season and playoffs ===
| | | | Regular season | | | | | Playoffs |
| Season | Team | League | GP | G | A | Pts | PIM | GP | G | A | Pts | PIM |
|---|---|---|---|---|---|---|---|---|---|---|---|---|
| 1941–42 | Regina Abbotts | S-SJHL | 3 | 0 | 0 | 0 | 0 | 5 | 0 | 0 | 0 | 0 |
| 1941–42 | Regina Abbotts | M-Cup | — | — | — | — | — | 7 | 0 | 1 | 1 | 0 |
| 1942–43 | Regina Abbotts | SJHL | 13 | 7 | 5 | 12 | 4 | 4 | 0 | 0 | 0 | 4 |
| 1943–44 | Chicago Black Hawks | NHL | 10 | 0 | 0 | 0 | 0 | — | — | — | — | — |
| 1943–44 | Providence Reds | AHL | 26 | 2 | 4 | 6 | 18 | — | — | — | — | — |
| 1943–44 | Philadelphia Falcons | EAHL | — | — | — | — | — | 9 | 1 | 1 | 2 | 0 |
| 1944–45 | Saskatoon Navy | SSHL | 9 | 9 | 10 | 19 | 8 | 5 | 9 | 2 | 11 | 9 |
| 1945–46 | Saskatoon Quakers | SSHL | 23 | 3 | 3 | 6 | 2 | 3 | 1 | 0 | 1 | 0 |
| 1945–46 | Portland Eagles | PCHL | 5 | 1 | 1 | 2 | 0 | — | — | — | — | — |
| 1946–47 | Saskatoon Quakers | WCSHL | 37 | 7 | 14 | 21 | 27 | 3 | 0 | 0 | 0 | 0 |
| 1947–48 | Edmonton Flyers | WCSHL | 14 | 0 | 3 | 3 | 10 | — | — | — | — | — |
| 1948–49 | Milwaukee Clarks | IHL | 21 | 9 | 8 | 17 | 48 | 8 | 5 | 5 | 10 | 19 |
| 1949–50 | Milwaukee Clarks | EAHL | 51 | 20 | 22 | 42 | 62 | 14 | 3 | 1 | 4 | 15 |
| 1950–51 | Atlantic City Seagulls | EAHL | 54 | 26 | 40 | 66 | 25 | 13 | 1 | 4 | 5 | 2 |
| 1951–52 | Atlantic City Seagulls | EAHL | 65 | 33 | 38 | 71 | 33 | — | — | — | — | — |
| 1952–53 | Troy Bruins | IHL | 59 | 28 | 33 | 61 | 42 | 6 | 2 | 1 | 3 | 2 |
| 1953–54 | Troy Bruins | IHL | 64 | 29 | 34 | 63 | 23 | 3 | 4 | 1 | 5 | 0 |
| 1954–55 | Troy Bruins | IHL | 60 | 19 | 28 | 47 | 69 | 11 | 3 | 4 | 7 | 14 |
| 1955–56 | Indianapolis Chiefs | IHL | — | 16 | 17 | 33 | 34 | — | — | — | — | — |
| 1955–56 | Troy Bruins | IHL | — | — | — | — | — | — | — | — | — | — |
| IHL totals | | | 204 | 101 | 120 | 221 | 216 | 28 | 14 | 11 | 25 | 35 |
| NHL totals | | | 10 | 0 | 0 | 0 | 0 | — | — | — | — | — |
