= Aud Tuten =

American-born Canadian ice hockey player

- Born: January 14, 1914 Enterprise, Alabama, U.S.
- Died: May 7, 1994 (aged 80) Swift Current, Saskatchewan, Canada
- Height: 5 ft 10 in (178 cm)
- Weight: 181 lb (82 kg; 12 st 13 lb)
- Position: Defence
- Shot: Left
- Played for: Chicago Black Hawks
- Playing career: 1934–1949

Audley Kendrick Tuten (January 14, 1914 – May 7, 1994) was an American-born Canadian professional ice hockey player who played 39 games in the National Hockey League with the Chicago Black Hawks during the 1941–42 and 1942–43 seasons. The rest of his career, which lasted from 1934 to 1949, was spent in various minor leagues. Tuten was born in Enterprise, Alabama, and was raised in Saltcoats, Saskatchewan.

== Career statistics ==
=== Regular season and playoffs ===
			Regular season					Playoffs
Season	Team	League	GP	G	A	Pts	PIM	GP	G	A	Pts	PIM
1932–33	Melville Millionaires	S-SSHL	9	4	1	5	0	3	1	2	3	0
1932–33	Saskatoon Tigers	N-SJHL	4	1	1	2	0	2	0	0	0	7
1932–33	Saskatoon Tigers	M-Cup	—	—	—	—	—	3	1	0	1	7
1933–34	Regina Pats	S-SJHL	2	0	2	2	2	4	0	1	1	8
1933–34	Regina Pats	M-Cup	—	—	—	—	—	4	0	1	1	8
1934–35	Hershey B'ars	EAHL	21	3	6	9	35	9	3	1	4	16
1935–36	Hershey B'ars	EAHL	40	9	5	14	64	8	3	2	5	20
1936–37	Hershey Bears	EAHL	46	7	8	15	82	4	0	1	1	6
1937–38	Hershey Bears	EAHL	43	6	9	15	62	—	—	—	—	—
1938–39	Baltimore Orioles	EAHL	53	13	9	22	109	—	—	—	—	—
1939–40	Kansas City Greyhounds	AHA	48	10	15	25	104	—	—	—	—	—
1940–41	Kansas City Greyhounds	AHA	47	11	16	27	75	8	1	1	2	12
1941–42	Chicago Black Hawks	NHL	5	1	1	2	10	—	—	—	—	—
1941–42	Kansas City Greyhounds	AHA	45	13	17	30	72	6	2	4	6	19
1942–43	Chicago Black Hawks	NHL	34	3	7	10	38	—	—	—	—	—
1944–45	San Diego Skyhawks	PCHL	10	1	6	7	4	3	1	3	4	2
1946–47	Oakland Oaks	PCHL	45	23	22	45	41	—	—	—	—	—
1946–47	Kansas City Pla-Mors	USHL	10	2	3	5	4	—	—	—	—	—
1948–49	Los Angeles Monarchs	PCHL	19	2	5	7	25	—	—	—	—	—
1948–49	San Diego Skyhawks	PCHL	5	0	0	0	8	—	—	—	—	—
EAHL totals			203	38	37	75	352	21	6	4	10	42
NHL totals			39	4	8	12	48	—	—	—	—	—
