= Charlie Sands (ice hockey) =

Canadian ice hockey player

- Born: May 23, 1910 Fort William, Ontario, Canada
- Died: April 6, 1953 (aged 42)
- Height: 5 ft 9 in (175 cm)
- Weight: 160 lb (73 kg; 11 st 6 lb)
- Position: Centre/Right Wing
- Shot: Right
- Played for: Toronto Maple Leafs; Boston Bruins; Montreal Canadiens; New York Rangers
- Playing career: 1932–1947

Charles Henry Sands (March 23, 1911 in Fort William, Ontario – April 6, 1953) was a Canadian ice hockey right winger who played 12 seasons in the National Hockey League for the Toronto Maple Leafs, Boston Bruins, Montreal Canadiens and New York Rangers. Sands won the Stanley Cup with Boston in 1939.

== Career statistics ==
=== Regular season and playoffs ===
| | | | Regular season | | | | | Playoffs |
| Season | Team | League | GP | G | A | Pts | PIM | GP | G | A | Pts | PIM |
|---|---|---|---|---|---|---|---|---|---|---|---|---|
| 1929–30 | Fort William Forts | TBSHL | 14 | 1 | 1 | 2 | 0 | — | — | — | — | — |
| 1930–31 | Port Arthur Ports | TBSHL | 22 | 10 | 1 | 11 | 25 | 2 | 0 | 0 | 0 | 0 |
| 1931–32 | Port Arthur Ports | TBSHL | 17 | 6 | 3 | 9 | 10 | 2 | 1 | 0 | 1 | 9 |
| 1932–33 | Toronto Maple Leafs | NHL | 3 | 0 | 3 | 3 | 0 | 9 | 2 | 2 | 4 | 2 |
| 1932–33 | Syracuse Stars | IHL | 37 | 10 | 5 | 15 | 10 | 1 | 0 | 0 | 0 | 4 |
| 1933–34 | Toronto Maple Leafs | NHL | 45 | 8 | 8 | 16 | 2 | 5 | 1 | 0 | 1 | 0 |
| 1934–35 | Boston Bruins | NHL | 41 | 15 | 15 | 30 | 0 | 4 | 0 | 0 | 0 | 0 |
| 1935–36 | Boston Bruins | NHL | 40 | 6 | 4 | 10 | 8 | 2 | 0 | 0 | 0 | 0 |
| 1935–36 | Boston Cubs | Can-Am | 5 | 1 | 3 | 4 | 0 | — | — | — | — | — |
| 1936–37 | Boston Bruins | NHL | 47 | 18 | 5 | 23 | 6 | 3 | 1 | 2 | 3 | 0 |
| 1937–38 | Boston Bruins | NHL | 46 | 17 | 12 | 29 | 12 | 3 | 1 | 1 | 2 | 0 |
| 1938–39 | Boston Bruins | NHL | 38 | 7 | 5 | 12 | 8 | 1 | 0 | 0 | 0 | 0 |
| 1938–39 | Hershey Bears | IAHL | 4 | 3 | 1 | 4 | 0 | — | — | — | — | — |
| 1939–40 | Montreal Canadiens | NHL | 47 | 9 | 20 | 29 | 10 | — | — | — | — | — |
| 1940–41 | Montreal Canadiens | NHL | 43 | 5 | 13 | 18 | 26 | 2 | 1 | 0 | 1 | 0 |
| 1941–42 | Montreal Canadiens | NHL | 39 | 11 | 16 | 27 | 6 | 3 | 0 | 1 | 1 | 2 |
| 1942–43 | Montreal Canadiens | NHL | 31 | 3 | 9 | 12 | 0 | 2 | 0 | 0 | 0 | 0 |
| 1942–43 | Washington Lions | AHL | 1 | 0 | 1 | 1 | 0 | — | — | — | — | — |
| 1943–44 | New York Rangers | NHL | 9 | 0 | 2 | 2 | 0 | — | — | — | — | — |
| 1943–44 | Pasadena Panthers | CalHL | — | — | — | — | — | — | — | — | — | — |
| 1944–45 | Pasadena Panthers | PCHL | 15 | 14 | 24 | 38 | 0 | — | — | — | — | — |
| 1945–46 | Los Angeles Monarchs | PCHL | 11 | 3 | 3 | 6 | 0 | — | — | — | — | — |
| 1946–47 | Fresno Falcons | PCHL | 3 | 1 | 6 | 7 | 0 | — | — | — | — | — |
| NHL totals | | | 429 | 99 | 112 | 211 | 58 | 33 | 6 | 6 | 12 | 4 |
