= Denny Edge =

Canadian-American ice hockey player and coach

- Edge during his time coaching Gonzaga

Biographical details
- Born: January 10, 1903; Saskatchewan, Canada
- Died: February 18, 1954 (aged 51); Medford, Oregon, U.S.

Coaching career (HC unless noted)
- 1937–1940: Gonzaga (NCAA)
- 1944–1945: Oakland Oaks (PCHL)

Head coaching record
- Overall: 27–13–4 (NCAA)

Dennis Douglas Edge (January 10, 1903 – February 18, 1954) was a Canadian player and coach of ice hockey. He served as head coach of the college ice hockey team at Gonzaga University prior to World War II.

== Biography ==
Edge was born in January 1903 in Saskatchewan, Canada, (Note: Some sources state that Edge was born in England; however, both his 1942 draft registration card and 1930 census entry list him as being born in Canada.) and immigrated to the United States in 1925. He was active as an ice hockey player from 1918 until 1927, including two years with the Regina Pats, and culminating with a season of professional play in Los Angeles. Photos with the Oregon Historical Society show in him in uniform with other players on a team named the Spalding Aces. Edge coached the Gonzaga Bulldogs men's ice hockey team prior to World War II, taking that role during the 1937–38 season, and staying through completion of the 1939–40 season. He later served as the head coach for the Oakland Oaks of the Pacific Coast Hockey League during their inaugural season of 1944–45. Edge died in February 1954 at his home in Medford, Oregon; he was survived by his wife and two daughters.
