= Les Cunningham =

Canadian ice hockey player

- Born: October 4, 1913; Calgary, Alberta, Canada
- Died: April 9, 1993 (aged 79)
- Height: 5 ft 9 in (175 cm)
- Weight: 167 lb (76 kg; 11 st 13 lb)
- Position: Centre
- Shot: Left
- Played for: New York Americans; Chicago Black Hawks
- Playing career: 1933–1949

Leslie Roy Cunningham (October 4, 1913 – April 9, 1993) was a Canadian ice hockey player. He played 60 games in the National Hockey League with the New York Americans and Chicago Black Hawks between 1936 and 1940. The rest of his career, which lasted from 1933 to 1949, was mainly spent in the American Hockey League. The American Hockey League presents the Les Cunningham Award annually to its league MVP. Cunningham was born in Calgary, Alberta.

== Career statistics ==
=== Regular season and playoffs ===
			Regular season					Playoffs
Season	Team	League	GP	G	A	Pts	PIM	GP	G	A	Pts	PIM
1931–32	Calgary Jimmies	CCJHL	12	3	2	5	15	3	1	0	1	6
1931–32	Calgary Jimmies	M-Cup	—	—	—	—	—	8	4	0	4	4
1932–33	Regina Pats	SJHL	3	3	0	3	0	2	1	0	1	0
1932–33	Regina Pats	M-Cup	—	—	—	—	—	13	5	0	5	12
1933–34	Saskatoon Elites	SSHL	20	16	10	26	18	4	2	0	2	4
1934–35	Buffalo Bisons	IHL	42	12	12	24	34	—	—	—	—	—
1935–36	Buffalo Bisons	IHL	37	9	13	22	37	5	1	1	2	0
1936–37	Cleveland Falcons	IAHL	20	4	4	8	17	—	—	—	—	—
1936–37	New York Americans	NHL	23	1	8	9	19	—	—	—	—	—
1937–38	Cleveland Barons	IAHL	48	19	28	47	55	2	1	2	3	0
1938–39	Cleveland Barons	IAHL	52	26	20	46	49	9	6	4	10	0
1939–40	Chicago Black Hawks	NHL	37	6	11	17	2	1	0	0	0	0
1940–41	Cleveland Barons	AHL	56	22	42	64	10	9	3	4	7	2
1941–42	Cleveland Barons	AHL	56	25	35	60	23	5	4	2	6	4
1942–43	Cleveland Barons	AHL	55	35	47	82	24	4	2	2	4	0
1943–44	Cleveland Barons	AHL	52	26	52	78	13	11	6	4	10	0
1944–45	Cleveland Barons	AHL	56	35	45	80	4	11	3	8	11	2
1945–46	Cleveland Barons	AHL	62	33	44	77	10	7	4	6	10	5
1946–47	Cleveland Barons	AHL	61	8	29	37	11	—	—	—	—	—
1947–48	San Francisco Shamrocks	PCHL	39	15	24	39	27	3	0	5	5	2
1948–49	San Francisco Shamrocks	PCHL	9	4	4	8	14	—	—	—	—	—
IAHL/AHL totals			518	233	346	579	216	58	29	32	61	13
NHL totals			60	7	19	26	21	1	0	0	0	0
