= Northwest International Hockey League =

- Sport: Ice hockey
- Founded: 1943
- Folded: 1944
- No. of teams: 5
- Country: United States; Canada
- Most titles: Vancouver Maple Leafs

The Northwest International Hockey League was a senior ice hockey league that existed for one year during World War II. The league comprised teams in the Pacific Northwest and merged with the Southern California Hockey League in 1944 to form the third incarnation of the Pacific Coast Hockey League.

== History ==
In the only season of existence, the four American teams were split between two cities (Portland and Seattle) and each pair shared a local rink. The Portland Ice Arena and the Seattle Civic Ice Arena combined to host every single game played by the NIHL. The Vancouver Maple Leafs played only road games but, despite this, still managed to win the championship. As part of the merger with the SCHL, the two pairs of teams each merged to form a single entity while Vancouver was dropped. The four American teams had corporate sponsorship deals that ended at the time of the merger.

== Results ==
=== Standings ===
Team	GP	W	L	T	Pts	GF	GA
Vancouver Maple Leafs	16	12	4	0	24	95	69
Seattle Isacsson Iron Workers	16	9	7	0	18	103	87
Portland Oilers	16	6	8	2	14	68	78
Portland Tiremen	16	6	9	1	13	68	93
Seattle Boeing Bombers	16	5	10	1	11	72	79

=== Playoff ===
Semifinal
2	Seattle Isacsson Iron Workers	1	8	9
3	Portland Oilers	6	7	13

Final
1	Vancouver Maple Leafs	13	7	5	6	-	3
3	Portland Oilers	7	6	6	3	-	1

Note: The semifinal round was a two-game total-goal series while the final was a best-of-five.

== Sponsorship ==
- Portland Oilers (Hancock Oil)
- Portland Warcos/Tiremen (Decicco Tire)
- Seattle Boeing Bombers (Boeing)
- Seattle Isacsson Iron Workers (Issacson Ironworks)
- Vancouver Maple Leafs (none)

Note: One of the Portland teams began the year as the 'Portland Warcos' but changed to 'Portland Tiremen' when they received sponsorship.
