= Larry Thibeault =

Canadian ice hockey player

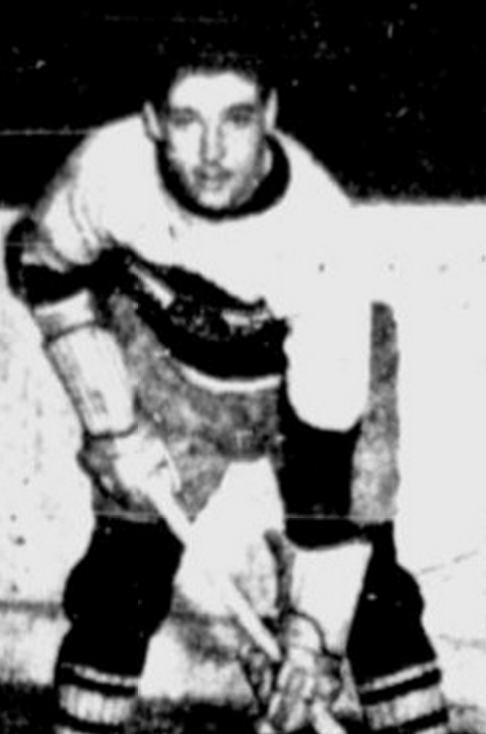
- Born: October 2, 1915; Chartrand Corner, Ontario, Canada
- Died: April 2, 1977 (aged 61); Quebec, Canada
- Height: 5 ft 7 in (170 cm)
- Weight: 180 lb (82 kg; 12 st 12 lb)
- Position: Left wing
- Shot: Left
- Played for: Detroit Red Wings; Montreal Canadiens
- Playing career: 1936–1956

Lorrain Lawrence "Larry Half-n-Half" Thibeault (October 2, 1915 – April 2, 1977) was a Canadian professional ice hockey forward who played 6 games in the National Hockey League for the Montreal Canadiens and Detroit Red Wings during the 1944–45 and 1945–46 seasons. The rest of his career, which lasted from 1936 to 1956, was spent in various minor and senior leagues.

== Playing career ==
Born near Charleston Lake, Ontario, Thibeault first played senior ice hockey for the Cornwall Flyers of the Ottawa City League in 1936–37, before moving to the Hull Volants of the Ottawa District senior league for 1937–38 and 1938–39. He left the Volants in the 1938–39 season to turn professional, joining the Springfield Indians of the International-American Hockey League. In 1941, he returned to the Cornwall Flyers, now playing in the Quebec Senior League, for one season. He joined the Canadian Army and played for the Cornwall Army team in the Quebec league for a season.

In 1943, Thibeault signed with the Buffalo Bisons of the American Hockey League (AHL). He had an excellent season contributing 63 points in 51 games. Buffalo traded him to the Detroit Red Wings in 1944. He managed to get into four games with Detroit, getting two assists but played most of the season with the Indianapolis Capitals of the AHL scoring 18 points in 31 games. In 1945, he was traded back to Buffalo by Detroit. In October 1945, Buffalo loaned him to the Montreal Canadiens in exchange for the loan of Wilf Field, Kenny Mosdell and Frank Eddolls. He played one game with Montreal but was returned to Buffalo in November 1945. Thibeault was reinstated as an amateur and returned to the Hull Volants where he played the balance of the 1945–46 season and six games of the 1946–47 season.

Thibeault was moved to the Victoriaville Tigre in 1946 and scored 35 goals and 62 points in the 1946–47 season. His season attracted the attention of the Houston Huskies who convinced him to return to the pro ranks for the 1947–48 season. He scored 12 goals and 29 points in 46 games for the Huskies. During the 1948–49 season, Thibeault split his season with Houston and the San Diego Skyhawks of the Pacific Coast League. He played his final professional season in 1949–50 with the Victoria Cougars of the PCHL, scoring 20 goals and 48 points in 66 games.

Thibeault returned to the Ottawa Valley and returned to senior hockey to play with the Buckingham Bucs and the Thurso Lumber Kings, finishing his hockey career in 1952.

After hockey, Thibeault became a full-time policeman with the Quebec Provincial Police.

== Career statistics ==
=== Regular season and playoffs ===
			Regular season					Playoffs
Season	Team	League	GP	G	A	Pts	PIM	GP	G	A	Pts	PIM
1936–37	Cornwall Flyers	OCHL	23	3	4	7	10	6	0	0	0	0
1937–38	Hull Volants	OCHL	20	10	4	14	6	9	2	2	4	5
1938–39	Hull Volants	OCHL	9	15	2	17	14	—	—	—	—	—
1938–39	Springfield Indians	IAHL	8	0	1	1	7	3	0	0	0	0
1939–40	Springfield Indians	IAHL	29	11	14	25	6	3	0	0	0	2
1940–41	Springfield Indians	AHL	54	14	18	32	32	3	1	0	1	2
1941–42	Cornwall Flyers	QSHL	36	17	18	35	45	5	1	4	5	6
1942–43	Cornwall Army	QSHL	33	21	27	48	22	6	1	2	3	2
1943–44	Buffalo Bisons	AHL	51	18	45	63	46	9	7	10	17	14
1944–45	Indianapolis Capitals	AHL	31	2	12	14	20	2	0	0	0	2
1944–45	Detroit Red Wings	NHL	4	0	2	2	2	—	—	—	—	—
1945–46	Montreal Canadiens	NHL	2	0	0	0	0	—	—	—	—	—
1945–46	Buffalo Bisons	AHL	6	2	3	5	4	—	—	—	—	—
1945–46	Hull Volants	QSHL	25	9	18	27	48	—	—	—	—	—
1946–47	Victoriaville Tigres	QSHL	35	21	41	62	40	5	2	3	5	2
1947–48	Houston Huskies	USHL	46	12	17	29	28	4	0	0	0	)
1948–49	Houston Huskies	USHL	22	7	6	13	14	—	—	—	—	—
1948–49	San Diego Skyhawks	PCHL	15	6	4	10	18	—	—	—	—	—
1949–50	Vancouver Canucks	PCHL	66	20	28	48	46	—	—	—	—	—
1950–51	Buckingham Beavers	ECSHL	—	—	—	—	—	—	—	—	—	—
1951–52	Buckingham Beavers	ECSHL	24	10	16	26	24	—	—	—	—	—
1951–52	Thurso Lumber Kings	ECSHL	10	3	3	6	15	6	1	1	2	4
1952–53	Thurso Lumber Kings	ECSHL	—	—	—	—	—	—	—	—	—	—
1953–54	Edmonton Flyers	WHL	61	4	8	12	6	13	2	1	3	2
1954–55	Quebec Aces	QSHL	39	1	8	9	27	1	0	0	0	0
1955–56	Quebec Aces	QSHL	28	1	5	6	6	—	—	—	—	—
IAHL/AHL totals			179	47	93	140	115	20	8	10	18	20
NHL totals			6	0	2	2	2	—	—	—	—	—
