= Ralph Buchanan =

Canadian ice hockey player

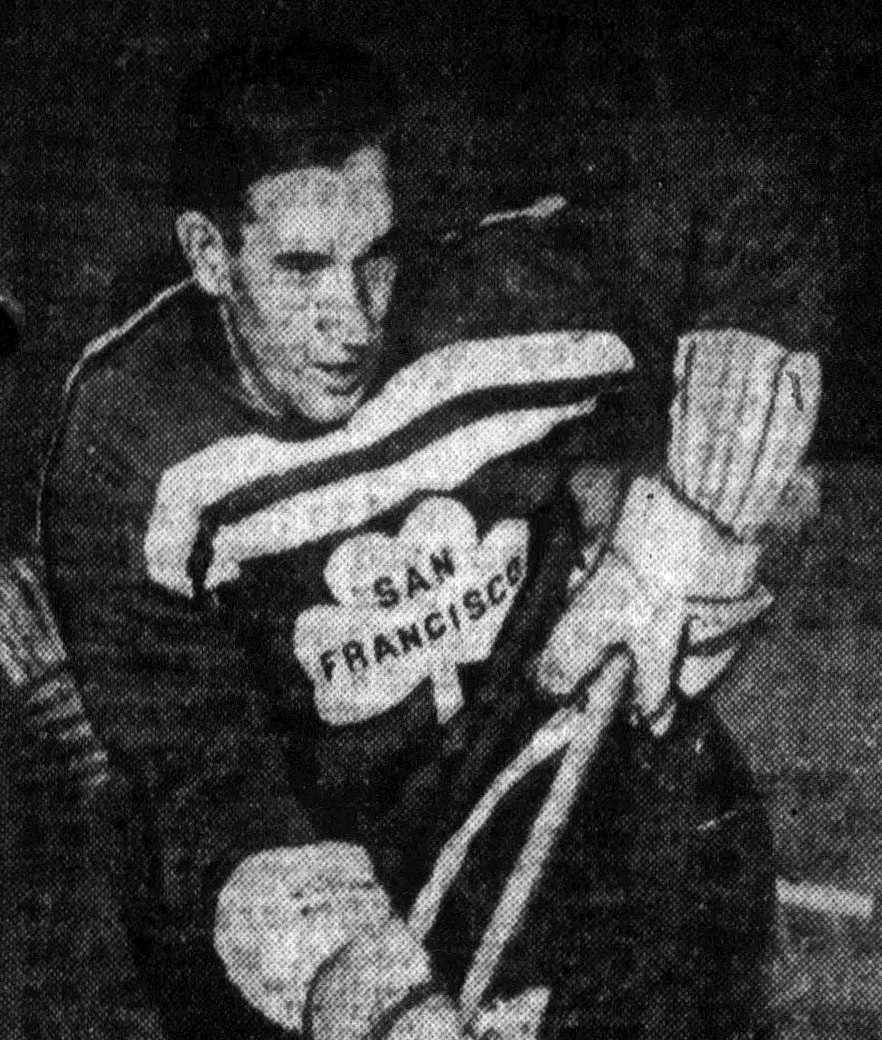
- Buchanan, circa 1946
- Born: December 28, 1922 Montreal, Quebec, Canada
- Died: April 24, 2005 (aged 82)
- Height: 5 ft 9 in (175 cm)
- Weight: 172 lb (78 kg; 12 st 4 lb)
- Position: Centre/Right Wing
- Shot: Right
- Played for: New York Rangers
- Playing career: 1942–1958

Ralph Leonard "Bucky" Buchanan (December 28, 1922 – April 24, 2005) was a Canadian ice hockey right winger. He played 2 games in the National Hockey League for the New York Rangers during the 1948–49 season. The rest of his career, which lasted from 1942 to 1958, was spent in the minor leagues. His son, Ron Buchanan, also played in the NHL.

== Career statistics ==
=== Regular season and playoffs ===
			Regular season					Playoffs
Season	Team	League	GP	G	A	Pts	PIM	GP	G	A	Pts	PIM
1940–41	Montreal Junior Canadiens	QJAHA	7	1	3	4	6	3	2	2	4	0
1941–42	Montreal Junior Canadiens	QJAHA	—	—	—	—	—	—	—	—	—	—
1942–43	Montreal Junior Royals	QJAHA	15	8	6	14	8	—	—	—	—	—
1942–43	Montreal Navy	MNDHL	10	4	7	11	11	5	3	2	5	2
1942–43	Toronto Navy	OHA Sr	—	—	—	—	—	2	0	2	2	2
1943–44	Montreal Navy	MNDHL	15	10	8	18	10	4	7	4	11	4
1944–45	Montreal Navy	MNDHL	13	17	13	30	10	5	4	6	10	2
1945–46	San Francisco Shamrocks	PCHL	40	50	25	75	27	—	—	—	—	—
1946–47	San Francisco Shamrocks	PCHL	57	66	27	93	45	—	—	—	—	—
1947–48	Shawinigan Falls Cataractes	QSHL	47	43	35	78	23	7	4	1	5	2
1948–49	New York Rangers	NHL	2	0	0	0	0	—	—	—	—	—
1948–49	Shawinigan Falls Cataractes	QSHL	33	21	25	46	8	7	2	3	5	12
1949–50	Shawinigan Falls Cataractes	QSHL	60	36	49	85	2	—	—	—	—	—
1950–51	Shawinigan Falls Cataractes	QSHL	52	28	36	64	30	—	—	—	—	—
1951–52	Shawinigan Falls Cataractes	QSHL	59	23	33	56	0	—	—	—	—	—
1952–53	Chicoutimi Sagueneens	QSHL	60	31	42	73	33	20	9	6	15	4
1953–54	Chicoutimi Sagueneens	QSHL	63	29	34	63	18	7	2	2	4	2
1954–55	Quebec Aces	QSHL	55	11	31	42	12	8	1	5	6	8
1955–56	Quebec Aces	QSHL	52	10	17	27	2	7	3	0	3	2
1956–57	Quebec Aces	QSHL	17	1	6	7	8	—	—	—	—	—
1956–57	Kingston CKLCs	OHA Sr	30	26	22	48	12	5	2	2	4	0
1957–58	Pembroke Lumber Kings	OHA Sr	29	11	14	25	14	—	—	—	—	—
QSHL totals			498	233	308	541	136	56	21	17	38	30
NHL totals			2	0	0	0	0	—	—	—	—	—
