= Joffre Desilets =

Canadian ice hockey player

- Born: April 16, 1915; Capreol, Ontario, Canada
- Died: November 30, 1994 (aged 79)
- Height: 5 ft 10 in (178 cm)
- Weight: 170 lb (77 kg; 12 st 2 lb)
- Position: Right wing
- Shot: Right
- Played for: Montreal Canadiens; Chicago Black Hawks
- Playing career: 1929–1953

Joffre Wilfred Desilets (April 16, 1915 – November 30, 1994) was a Canadian ice hockey player who played 192 games in the National Hockey League with the Montreal Canadiens and Chicago Black Hawks between 1935 and 1940. The rest of his career, which lasted from 1929 to 1952, was spent in various minor leagues. He was born in Capreol, Ontario but grew up in Renfrew, Ontario.

== Career statistics ==
=== Regular season and playoffs ===
| | | | Regular season | | | | | Playoffs |
| Season | Team | League | GP | G | A | Pts | PIM | GP | G | A | Pts | PIM |
|---|---|---|---|---|---|---|---|---|---|---|---|---|
| 1929–30 | Capreol Caps | OHA Sr | 10 | 1 | 0 | 1 | 0 | — | — | — | — | — |
| 1930–31 | Capreol Caps | OHA Sr | 12 | 4 | 0 | 4 | 4 | 1 | 0 | 0 | 0 | 0 |
| 1931–32 | Stratford Midgets | OHA | 9 | 6 | 1 | 7 | 6 | 2 | 4 | 2 | 6 | 2 |
| 1932–33 | Stratford Midgets | OHA | 14 | 22 | 7 | 29 | 30 | 3 | 4 | 0 | 4 | 0 |
| 1932–33 | Stratford Midgets | M-Cup | — | — | — | — | — | 8 | 11 | 2 | 13 | 16 |
| 1933–34 | Stratford Midgets | OHA | 15 | 34 | 13 | 47 | 27 | 12 | 14 | 7 | 21 | 12 |
| 1934–35 | Saint John Beavers | NBSHL | 17 | 35 | 27 | 62 | 2 | 12 | 14 | 7 | 21 | 12 |
| 1934–35 | Charlottetown Islanders | NBSHL | 20 | 10 | 13 | 23 | 16 | — | — | — | — | — |
| 1935–36 | Montreal Canadiens | NHL | 38 | 7 | 6 | 13 | 0 | — | — | — | — | — |
| 1935–36 | London Tecumsehs | IHL | 9 | 1 | 2 | 3 | 4 | 2 | 0 | 0 | 0 | 0 |
| 1936–37 | Montreal Canadiens | NHL | 48 | 7 | 12 | 19 | 17 | 5 | 1 | 0 | 1 | 0 |
| 1937–38 | Montreal Canadiens | NHL | 32 | 6 | 7 | 13 | 6 | 2 | 0 | 0 | 0 | 7 |
| 1937–38 | New Haven Eagles | IAHL | 16 | 4 | 2 | 6 | 2 | — | — | — | — | — |
| 1938–39 | Chicago Black Hawks | NHL | 48 | 11 | 13 | 24 | 28 | — | — | — | — | — |
| 1939–40 | Chicago Black Hawks | NHL | 25 | 6 | 7 | 13 | 6 | — | — | — | — | — |
| 1939–40 | Providence Reds | IAHL | 22 | 7 | 8 | 15 | 8 | 1 | 0 | 0 | 0 | 2 |
| 1940–41 | Cleveland Barons | AHL | 53 | 15 | 29 | 44 | 13 | 5 | 1 | 0 | 1 | 4 |
| 1941–42 | Cleveland Barons | AHL | 56 | 24 | 24 | 48 | 26 | 4 | 2 | 0 | 2 | 0 |
| 1942–43 | Victoria Army | NNDHL | 19 | 21 | 12 | 33 | 16 | 5 | 3 | 7 | 10 | 2 |
| 1942–43 | Victoria Army | Al-Cup | — | — | — | — | — | 18 | 24 | 6 | 30 | 14 |
| 1943–44 | Nanaimo Clippers | PCHL | 14 | 7 | 3 | 10 | 10 | — | — | — | — | — |
| 1943–44 | Vancouver RCAF | NNDHL | 3 | 2 | 0 | 2 | 0 | — | — | — | — | — |
| 1944–45 | Toronto Army Shamrocks | TIHL | 31 | 14 | 31 | 45 | 18 | 4 | 2 | 4 | 6 | 2 |
| 1944–45 | Toronto Army Daggers | TNDHL | 4 | 4 | 10 | 14 | 0 | 2 | 4 | 4 | 8 | 0 |
| 1944–45 | Toronto Army Daggers | OHA Sr | 3 | 2 | 2 | 4 | 0 | — | — | — | — | — |
| 1945–46 | New Haven Eagles | AHL | 30 | 6 | 3 | 9 | 10 | — | — | — | — | — |
| 1945–46 | Fort Worth Rangers | USHL | 23 | 6 | 13 | 19 | 0 | — | — | — | — | — |
| 1946–47 | Dallas Texans | USHL | 49 | 16 | 23 | 39 | 8 | — | — | — | — | — |
| 1947–48 | San Diego Skyhawks | PCHL | 53 | 5 | 21 | 26 | 16 | 9 | 4 | 2 | 6 | 0 |
| 1949–50 | Renfrew Millionaires | EOHL | 12 | 0 | 1 | 1 | 2 | — | — | — | — | — |
| 1951–52 | Renfrew Millionaires | EOHL | 16 | 3 | 4 | 7 | 2 | — | — | — | — | — |
| NHL totals | | | 192 | 37 | 45 | 82 | 57 | 7 | 1 | 0 | 1 | 7 |
