= Kootenay International Junior Hockey League (1962–1965) =

Canadian junior ice hockey league

The Kootenay International Hockey League was a semi-junior hockey league operating in the South-East Kootenays and North-Eastern Washington. The League is not officially connected to the modern day KIJHL, despite having many similar team names.

== History ==
=== Founding ===
The League was founded at the Nelson Civic Centre at 1:50pm on Sunday, July 8, 1962, and began with 4 teams, in the Trail Smoke Eaters, Cranbrook Canucks, Notre Dame University Knights (Nelson), and the Gonzaga Bulldogs (Spokane), these teams had played each other in an exhibition schedule the year before, in addition to exhibition games against the University of British Columbia, and Montana State University. The league also prepared for the possibility of adding a team in Rossland, BC and a second team in Spokane. The league, controversially would allow Notre Dame and Gonzaga to play with players who were older than junior age for fear of "destroy[ing] a possible strong club" This reason is why the current KIJHL does not recognize this league as part of their history.

=== Early seasons ===
The League's first game was October 20, 1962 at the Spokane Coliseum, Trail routed Gonzaga winning 9-0 while launching 61 shots on net. Allan Bunn became the first player to score a goal 41 seconds into the game. Mike Laughton, the first Nelson-born player in the NHL also scored for the Smoke Eaters that night. The league would continue with the same four teams the following season. The 1964–65 season was cancelled when Cranbrook and Gonzaga dropped out, despite this Notre Dame, Trail and Gonzaga still played an shortened exhibition season against each other, the University of Alberta and the University of Victoria.

=== Final seasons ===
The 1965–66 season saw the league return as the West Kootenay Junior Hockey League, with the Smoke Eaters being the only returning team. The Nelson Jr. Maple Leafs would take the place of Notre Dame and the Rossland Jr. Warriors would bring the total number of teams to three. The next year the league would add the Selkirk College Pioneers (Castlegar) and Fernie Rangers to bring the total up to five. This new alignment would last just one year before the league would be re-organized into the new version of the West Kootenay Junior Hockey League, that would eventually evolve into the KIJHL that exists today, the re-alignment was partially in response to the Okanagan-Mainline Junior Hockey League rebranding into the British Columbia Junior Hockey League in an attempt to remain considered a 'Junior A' league, something they could not do with University teams as the cutoff for Junior in BC is 20 years old and many of the university-aged players being too old to participate.
