= Steve Kraftcheck =

Canadian ice hockey player and coach

- Born: March 3, 1929 Tinturn, Ontario, Canada
- Died: August 10, 1997 (aged 68) Providence, Rhode Island, U.S.
- Height: 5 ft 11 in (180 cm)
- Weight: 185 lb (84 kg; 13 st 3 lb)
- Position: Defence
- Shot: Right
- Played for: Boston Bruins; New York Rangers; Toronto Maple Leafs
- Playing career: 1948–1964

Stephen Kraftcheck (March 3, 1929 – August 10, 1997) was a Canadian ice hockey defenceman and coach, born in Tinturn, Ontario. He played parts of four seasons in the National Hockey League between 1950 and 1959 with the Boston Bruins, New York Rangers, and Toronto Maple Leafs. The rest of his career, which lasted from 1948 to 1964, was mainly spent in the American Hockey League (AHL)., and he was inducted into the AHL's Hall of Fame in 2008,

== Playing career ==
His first National Hockey League (NHL) season was 1950–51, where he played 27 games for the Boston Bruins; 5 of these were in the playoffs versus the Toronto Maple Leafs, who went on to win the Stanley Cup that year. The next two seasons Kraftcheck played with the New York Rangers (1951-1953), netting 10 goals and 18 assists. After this stint, Kraftcheck remained a perennial all-star, but in the American Hockey League (AHL). The only other ice time he saw in the NHL was for 8 games during the 1958–59 season for the Toronto Maple Leafs.

Kraftcheck played 13 productive seasons in the AHL, where he scored 73 goals and added 417 assists. In two separate seasons, Kraftcheck scored 41 assists, and during three other seasons he scored 37.

Kraftcheck also held the head coach/player role during 3 seasons for the AHL's Rochester Americans (1958-1961). His team made the playoffs two of these years, with Kraftcheck remaining an integral presence on the ice. In 1959–60, his Rochester Americans were defeated in the Calder Cup finals by the Springfield Indians. Of his 3 coaching years, this was the only season Kraftcheck was the head coach for the entire year.

He also played in 5 AHL All-Star games throughout the 1950s. He was posthumously inducted to the AHL Hall of Fame in 2008. Kraftcheck was the first recipient of the Eddie Shore Award, awarded to the player chosen as the AHL's best defenceman.

During his AHL career, Kraftcheck also played for the Cleveland Barons, Indianapolis Capitals, and the Providence Reds.

== Career statistics ==
=== Regular season and playoffs ===
			Regular season					Playoffs
Season	Team	League	GP	G	A	Pts	PIM	GP	G	A	Pts	PIM
1945–46	Hamilton Lloyds	OHA	2	0	0	0	2	—	—	—	—	—
1946–47	Hamilton Aerovox	OHA-B	—	—	—	—	—	—	—	—	—	—
1947–48	Hamilton Aerovox	OHA-B	—	—	—	—	—	—	—	—	—	—
1948–49	San Francisco Shamrocks	PCHL	70	11	22	33	82	—	—	—	—	—
1949–50	Cleveland Barons	AHL	70	7	37	44	46	8	0	3	3	12
1950–51	Boston Bruins	NHL	22	0	0	0	8	6	0	0	0	7
1950–51	Indianapolis Capitals	AHL	47	6	27	33	39	3	0	0	0	2
1951–52	New York Rangers	NHL	58	8	9	17	30	—	—	—	—	—
1952–53	New York Rangers	NHL	69	2	9	11	45	—	—	—	—	—
1953–54	Cleveland Barons	AHL	70	5	20	25	62	7	2	1	3	10
1954–55	Cleveland Barons	AHL	60	9	26	35	38	4	0	2	2	0
1955–56	Cleveland Barons	AHL	57	5	29	34	40	8	1	4	5	10
1956–57	Cleveland Barons	AHL	63	7	33	40	42	12	2	11	13	8
1957–58	Cleveland Barons	AHL	66	15	34	49	53	7	0	3	3	4
1958–59	Toronto Maple Leafs	NHL	8	1	0	1	0	—	—	—	—	—
1958–59	Rochester Americans	AHL	60	2	37	39	42	5	0	2	2	4
1959–60	Rochester Americans	AHL	68	1	41	42	47	12	1	3	4	12
1960–61	Rochester Americans	AHL	71	3	37	40	26	—	—	—	—	—
1961–62	Rochester Americans	AHL	69	4	41	45	45	2	0	0	0	2
1962–63	Providence Reds	AHL	69	2	19	21	22	6	0	2	2	2
1963–64	Providence Reds	AHL	69	1	5	6	22	—	—	—	—	—
AHL totals			839	67	386	453	524	74	6	31	37	66
NHL totals			157	11	18	29	83	6	0	0	0	7
