= Don Campbell (ice hockey) =

Canadian ice hockey player (1925–2012)

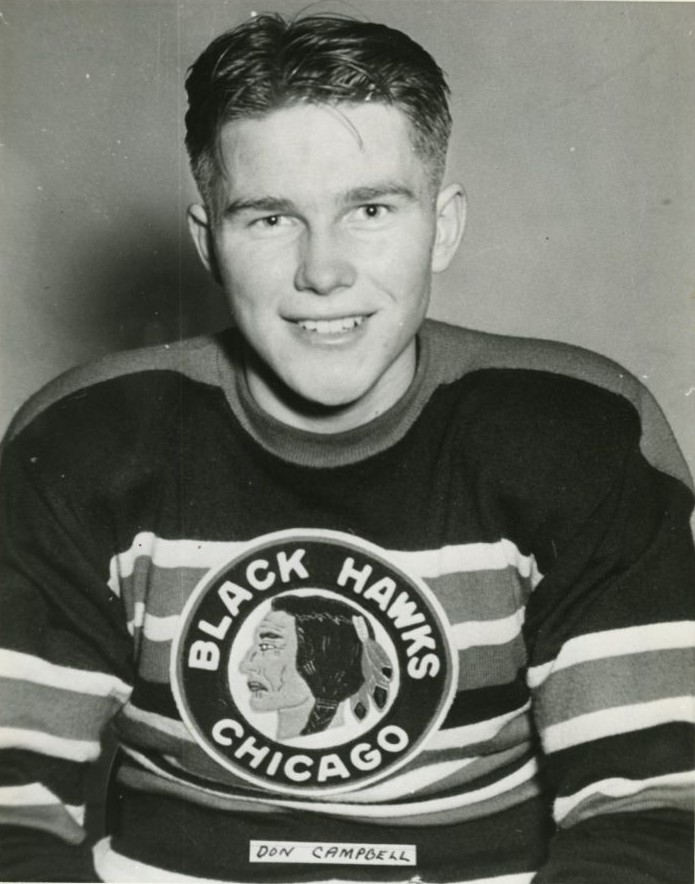
- Born: July 12, 1925; Drumheller, Alberta, Canada
- Died: December 20, 2012 (aged 87); Kelowna, British Columbia, Canada
- Height: 5 ft 10 in (178 cm)
- Weight: 175 lb (79 kg; 12 st 7 lb)
- Position: Centre
- Shot: Right
- Played for: Chicago Black Hawks
- Playing career: 1943–1954

Donald William Campbell (July 12, 1925 — December 20, 2012) was a Canadian ice hockey centre that played 17 games in the National Hockey League for the Chicago Black Hawks during the 1943–44 season. The rest of his career, which lasted from 1943 to 1954, was spent in the minor leagues. He later served as Superintendent of Parks and Recreation for the District of West Vancouver.

Born in Drumheller, Alberta, Campbell was the brother of Alberta politician, John Murray Campbell. He died in 2012.

== Career statistics ==
=== Regular season and playoffs ===
			Regular season					Playoffs
Season	Team	League	GP	G	A	Pts	PIM	GP	G	A	Pts	PIM
1941–42	Portage Terriers	MJHL	14	2	0	2	2	4	0	1	1	0
1941–42	Portage Terriers	M-Cup	—	—	—	—	—	10	0	0	0	0
1942–43	Portage Terriers	MJHL	11	2	2	4	14	—	—	—	—	—
1943–44	Portage Terriers	MJHL	1	0	0	0	0	—	—	—	—	—
1943–44	Chicago Black Hawks	NHL	17	1	3	4	8	—	—	—	—	—
1945–46	Seattle Ironmen	PCHL	49	21	27	48	31	3	0	1	1	0
1946–47	Seattle Ironmen	PCHL	37	7	10	17	16	10	2	2	4	6
1947–48	Portland Eagles	PCHL	5	0	2	2	4	—	—	—	—	—
1948–49	Portland Penguins	PCHL	17	0	1	1	15	—	—	—	—	—
1949–50	Kamloops Elks	OSHL	45	24	28	52	61	7	2	4	6	4
1950–51	Calgary Stampeders	WCSHL	7	1	0	1	10	—	—	—	—	—
1950–51	Kamloops Elks	OSHL	41	24	27	51	24	6	6	4	10	6
1951–52	Kamloops Elks	OSHL	27	11	12	23	24	—	—	—	—	—
1953–54	Kimberley Dynamiters	WIHL	38	18	20	38	41	9	3	3	6	12
NHL totals			17	1	3	4	6	—	—	—	—	—
