= Eric Prentice =

Canadian ice hockey player

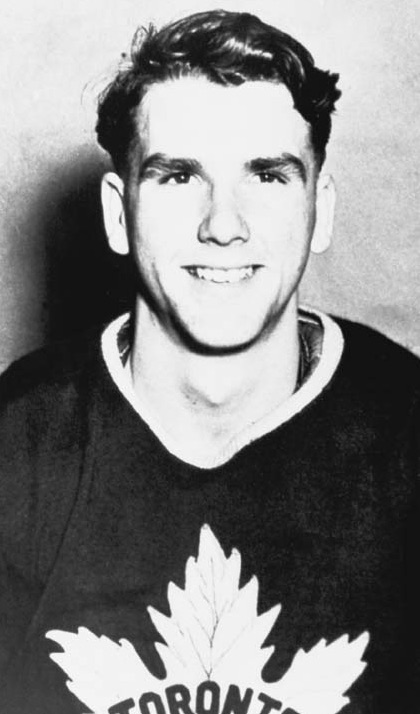
- Born: August 22, 1926; Schumacher, Ontario, Canada
- Died: December 8, 2002 (aged 76); Coleman, Alberta, Canada
- Height: 5 ft 11 in (180 cm)
- Weight: 150 lb (68 kg; 10 st 10 lb)
- Position: Left wing
- Shot: Left
- Played for: Toronto Maple Leafs
- Playing career: 1943–1950

Eric Dayton Prentice (August 22, 1926 — December 8, 2002) was a Canadian professional ice hockey left winger who played a total of 5 games in the National Hockey League (NHL) for the Toronto Maple Leafs during the 1943–44 season. The rest of his career, which lasted from 1943 to 1950, was spent in different minor leagues. Prentice holds the record for the youngest player signed by the Toronto Maple Leafs - he was 17. His brother Dean had a long career in the NHL, mainly with the New York Rangers, the Boston Bruins, and the Detroit Red Wings.

== Career ==
Prentice played the 1942–43 season with the Timmins Buffalo Ankerites in the Thunder Bay Junior A Hockey League. He then spent the 1943–44 season playing with Providence-Hershey in the American Hockey League. He made his only appearance in the NHL when he played five games for the Toronto Maple Leafs. During those five games, he failed to record a point and spent 4 minutes in the penalty box. In 1944–45, he played with the Pittsburgh Hornets in the American Hockey League. He then split the 1945–46 season between the Omaha Knights in the United States Hockey League and the Hollywood Wolves in the Pacific Coast Hockey League. He went back to the Wolves in 1946–47. Next, he played for the Fresno Falcons in 1947–48, then spent 1948–49 with the Philadelphia Rockets before ending his professional career in 1949–50 in Oakland-LA-Fresno in the PCHL.

== Post-hockey ==
Prentice was the father of former Premier of Alberta Jim Prentice. Prentice died on December 8, 2002, in Coleman, Alberta from amyotrophic lateral sclerosis.

== Career statistics ==
=== Regular season and playoffs ===
			Regular season					Playoffs
Season	Team	League	GP	G	A	Pts	PIM	GP	G	A	Pts	PIM
1942–43	Timmins Buffalo Ankerites	TBSHL	—	—	—	—	—	—	—	—	—	—
1943–44	Toronto Maple Leafs	NHL	5	0	0	0	4	—	—	—	—	—
1943–44	Providence Reds	AHL	7	0	1	1	2	—	—	—	—	—
1943–44	Hershey Bears	AHL	6	3	2	5	12	7	2	0	2	0
1944–45	Pittsburgh Hornets	AHL	33	9	7	16	10	—	—	—	—	—
1945–46	Omaha Knights	USHL	3	0	2	2	2	—	—	—	—	—
1945–46	Hollywood Wolves	PCHL	21	6	6	12	19	12	4	9	13	12
1946–47	Hollywood Wolves	PCHL	60	18	22	40	12	7	2	3	5	6
1947–48	Fresno Falcons	PCHL	62	18	12	30	58	6	1	2	3	9
1948–49	Philadelphia Rockets	AHL	63	22	24	46	10	—	—	—	—	—
1949–50	Fresno Falcons	PCHL	65	20	16	36	22	—	—	—	—	—
PCHL totals			208	62	56	118	111	25	7	14	21	27
NHL totals			5	0	0	0	4	—	—	—	—	—
