= Bill Summerhill =

Canadian ice hockey player

- Born: July 9, 1915; Toronto, Ontario, Canada
- Died: October 29, 1978 (aged 63)
- Height: 5 ft 9 in (175 cm)
- Weight: 170 lb (77 kg; 12 st 2 lb)
- Position: Right Wing
- Shot: Right
- Played for: Brooklyn Americans; Montreal Canadiens
- Playing career: 1938–1951

William Arthur Summerhill (July 9, 1915 – October 29, 1978) was a Canadian ice hockey forward who played 72 games in the National Hockey League for the Montreal Canadiens and Brooklyn Americans between 1938 and 1942. The rest of his career, which lasted from 1938 to 1951, was mainly spent in the minor American Hockey League. He was born in Toronto, Ontario.

== Career statistics ==
=== Regular season and playoffs ===
			Regular season					Playoffs
Season	Team	League	GP	G	A	Pts	PIM	GP	G	A	Pts	PIM
1937–38	Verdun Maple Leafs	MCHL	22	16	20	36	20	8	8	1	9	18
1937–38	Montreal Canadiens	NHL	—	—	—	—	—	1	0	0	0	0
1938–39	Montreal Canadiens	NHL	43	6	10	16	28	2	0	0	0	2
1938–39	New Haven Eagles	IAHL	6	1	2	3	0	—	—	—	—	—
1939–40	Montreal Canadiens	NHL	13	3	2	5	24	—	—	—	—	—
1939–40	New Haven Eagles	IAHL	27	14	27	41	16	3	1	1	2	2
1940–41	Cleveland Barons	IAHL	49	14	13	27	48	8	2	2	4	8
1941–42	Brooklyn Americans	NHL	16	5	5	10	18	—	—	—	—	—
1941–42	Springfield Indians	AHL	36	21	28	49	42	5	5	1	6	2
1942–43	Buffalo Bisons	AHL	56	41	27	68	64	9	5	9	14	2
1943–44	Toronto Army Daggers	OHA Sr	1	0	0	0	0	—	—	—	—	—
1944–45	Toronto Shamrocks	TIHL	14	13	11	24	16	4	7	2	9	4
1944–45	Toronto Army Daggers	TNDHL	—	—	—	—	—	3	5	5	10	0
1945–46	New Haven Ramblers	AHL	21	5	7	12	16	—	—	—	—	—
1945–46	Fort Worth Rangers	USHL	13	4	3	7	8	—	—	—	—	—
1946–47	Springfield Indians	AHL	61	26	30	56	37	2	1	1	2	0
1947–48	Springfield Indians	AHL	67	27	47	74	22	—	—	—	—	—
1948–49	Springfield Indians	AHL	65	30	36	66	36	3	3	4	7	2
1949–50	Springfield Indians	AHL	25	10	15	25	18	—	—	—	—	—
1950–51	New Haven Eagles	AHL	27	12	11	23	16	—	—	—	—	—
1950–51	Portland Eagles	PCHL	40	15	16	31	10	6	1	0	1	4
AHL totals			407	186	214	400	299	27	16	17	33	14
NHL totals			72	14	17	31	70	3	0	0	0	2
