= James Jamieson (ice hockey) =

Canadian ice hockey player

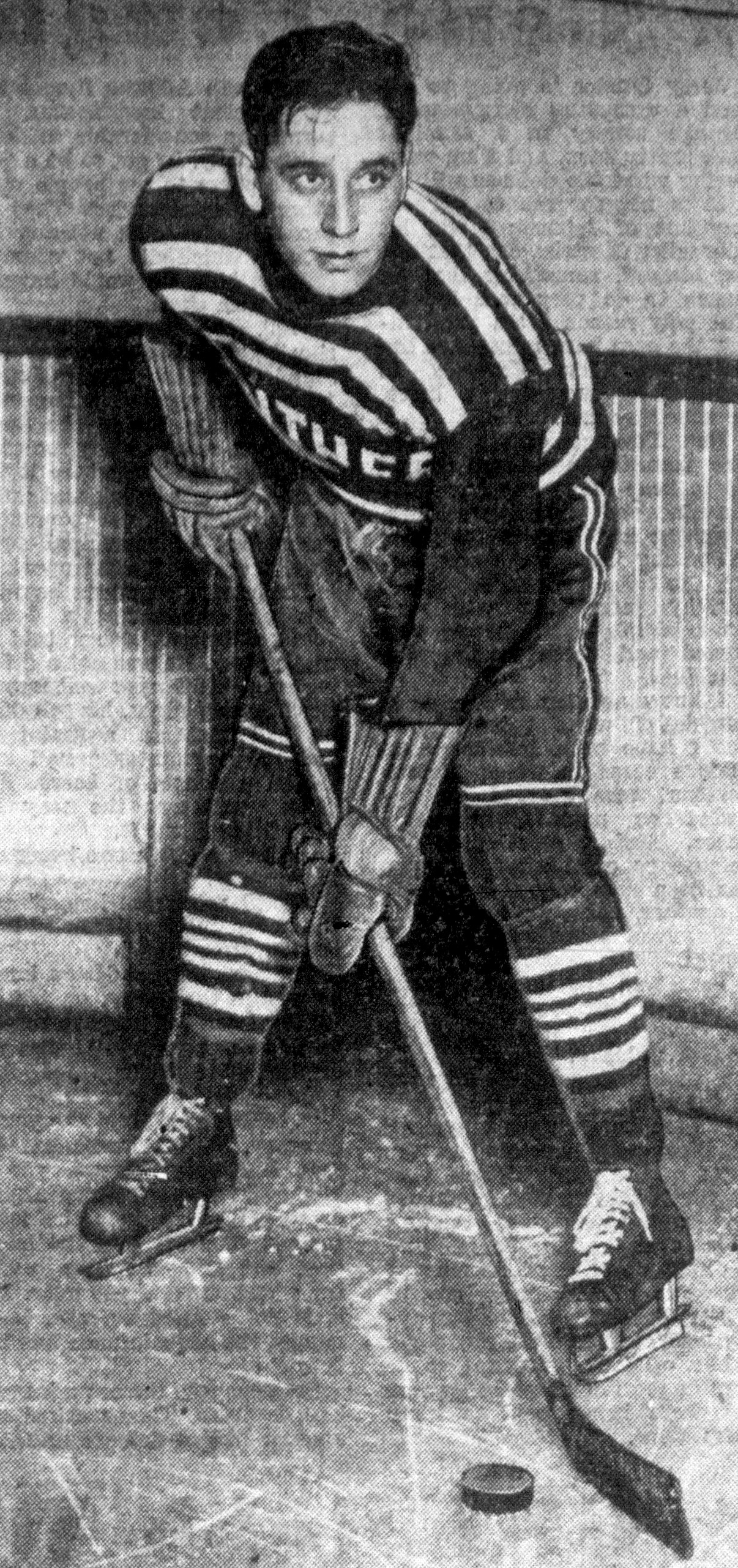
- Born: March 21, 1921 Grand River, Ontario, Canada
- Died: December 26, 1985 (aged 63) Brantford, Ontario, Canada
- Height: 5 ft 9 in (175 cm)
- Weight: 170 lb (77 kg; 12 st 2 lb)
- Position: Defence
- Shot: Left
- Played for: New York Rangers
- Playing career: 1940–1952

James "Jimmy" Jamieson (March 21, 1921 – December 26, 1985) was a Canadian ice hockey defenceman. He played in one game in the National Hockey League for the New York Rangers during the 1943–44 season, on January 13, 1944, against the Chicago Black Hawks. The rest of his career, which lasted from 1940 to 1952, was spent in the minor leagues.

== Career statistics ==
=== Regular season and playoffs ===
			Regular season					Playoffs
Season	Team	League	GP	G	A	Pts	PIM	GP	G	A	Pts	PIM
1940–41	Detroit Holzbaugh	MOHL	27	14	6	20	47	7	5	7	12	15
1942–43	Windsor Ford	MOHL	15	10	6	16	8	3	0	2	2	4
1942–43	New York Rovers	EAHL	—	—	—	—	—	1	0	0	0	0
1943–44	New York Rangers	NHL	1	0	1	1	0	—	—	—	—	—
1943–44	New York Rovers	EAHL	40	6	10	16	73	11	3	2	5	22
1944–45	Pasadena Panthers	PCHL	—	—	—	—	—	—	—	—	—	—
1946–47	Baltimore Clippers	EAHL	50	9	23	32	29	9	2	2	4	8
1947–48	Powassan Hawks	NBDHL	22	13	9	22	9	—	—	—	—	—
1948–49	Milwaukee Clarks/Akron Americans	IHL	18	4	5	9	28	2	0	0	0	0
1951–52	Brantford Redmen	OHA Sr	13	1	1	2	6	—	—	—	—	—
EAHL totals			90	15	33	48	102	21	5	4	9	30
NHL totals			1	0	1	1	0	—	—	—	—	—

== See also ==
- List of players who played only one game in the NHL
