= San Francisco Shamrocks (PCHL) =

- City: San Francisco, California
- League: Pacific Coast Hockey League
- Founded: 1944
- Folded: 1950
- Home arena: Winterland Arena

The San Francisco Shamrocks were an amateur ice hockey team from San Francisco, California. The team was one of the founding member of the third iteration of the Pacific Coast Hockey League and survived until 1950.

== History ==
The Shamrocks were founded in 1944 when the Southern California Hockey League and Northwest International Hockey League merged to form the Pacific Coast Hockey League. As it was approximately halfway between the two separate leagues, the San Francisco region was a natural place for new teams to find a home, as was the case with the Fresno Falcons and Oakland Oaks. The Shamrocks were originally placed in the central division but found themselves lumped in with the other California clubs in the south division by year two. The team was largely unsuccessful both on and off the ice, and by 1950 the club was in debt. The Shamrocks, along with the San Diego Skyhawks, asked the league for a 1-year hiatus in 1950 with the intent to return but the move proved disastrous for the club. With the league only operating clubs in the Pacific Northwest, the reduction in travel costs proved to be a welcome relief for the extant teams. The financial surety, along with the fact that California crowds had yet to become enamored with the sport, convinced the PCHL to abandon the market. Rather than try to find a new league or play independently, the Shamrocks were allowed to remain dormant.

More than 25 years later, the San Francisco Shamrocks name was revived for the Pacific Hockey League, but that club had no formal connection with this franchise.

=== Train crash ===
On February 6, 1947, midway through the team's third season, the Shamrocks were travelling to a game when their train slammed into a truck carrying gasoline in Fresno, California. The fuel ignited and showered the train, injuring many passengers and killing four. The 15 members of the team were hailed as local heroes after they helped to carry several injured people away from the burning train. The players kicked out windows and walked through a burning train car to help, severely injured six Shamrocks. Though their issues were not considered life-threatening, the affected players (Roy McKay, Boyd Prentice, George DeFelice, Rolly Morrisseau, Sid Lovelace and Ralph Orlando) missed the remainder of the season. (Morrisseau had the worst of the injuries, with burns from his waist up to his head.) In order to help the team, each of the other clubs in the PCHL's Southern Division agreed to send a player to San Francisco so they could finish out the season with a full roster.

== Season-by-season results ==
Season	GP	W	L	T	Pts	Finish	Coach	Postseason
1944–45	20	7	12	1	15	2nd in Central	Laurie Scott	—
1945–46	40	11	29	0	22	5th in South	Redvers MacKenzie	missed
1946–47	60	17	42	1	35	6th in South	Al Murray	missed
1947–48	66	35	29	2	72	2nd in South	Les Cunningham	First round
1948–49	70	29	36	5	63	5th in South	Les Cunningham	missed
1948–49	71	35	27	9	79	1st in South	Tony Hemmerling	First round

== Notable players ==
- Dick Bittner
- Ralph Buchanan
- Maurice Courteau
- Joe Crozier
- Les Cunningham
- Paul Gauthier
- Wally Hergesheimer
- Doug Jackson
- Lou Jankowski
- Steve Kraftcheck
- Stanford Smith
- Neil Strain
