= Portland Eagles =

The Portland Eagles were a minor league professional hockey team located in Portland, Oregon. They were known as the Portland Penguins for one season.

== History ==
The Eagles competed in the Pacific Coast Hockey League from 1944 until the team's final season in 1951. In the Eagles' inaugural season, they placed second in the PCHL losing to the Seattle Ironmen in the championship game. The Eagles placed first in their division next season (1945–46) and went on to defeat the Ironmen in the semifinals. However, the Eagles would be swept by the Los Angeles Monarchs in the finals. The Eagles would go on to make the playoffs twice in their remaining seasons both times resulting in a first-round loss.

The team changed its name to the Portland Penguins for the 1949–50 season. In 1950–51, the team's final season, the Eagles name was brought back and Tony Hemmerling was appointed head coach. The Eagles lost in the first round of the playoffs in 1951. 1950–51 would be the last season for the Eagles because of financial problems and a worsening arena, the team folded.

== NHL Players ==
- Gordon Buttrey
- Don Campbell
- Red Carr
- Les Colvin
- Hec Highton
- John Holota
- Eddie Kullman
- Bill Kyle
- Jack McDonald
- Al Millar
- Bill Summerhill
- Aubrey Webster
