= John McDonald (ice hockey) =

Canadian ice hockey player

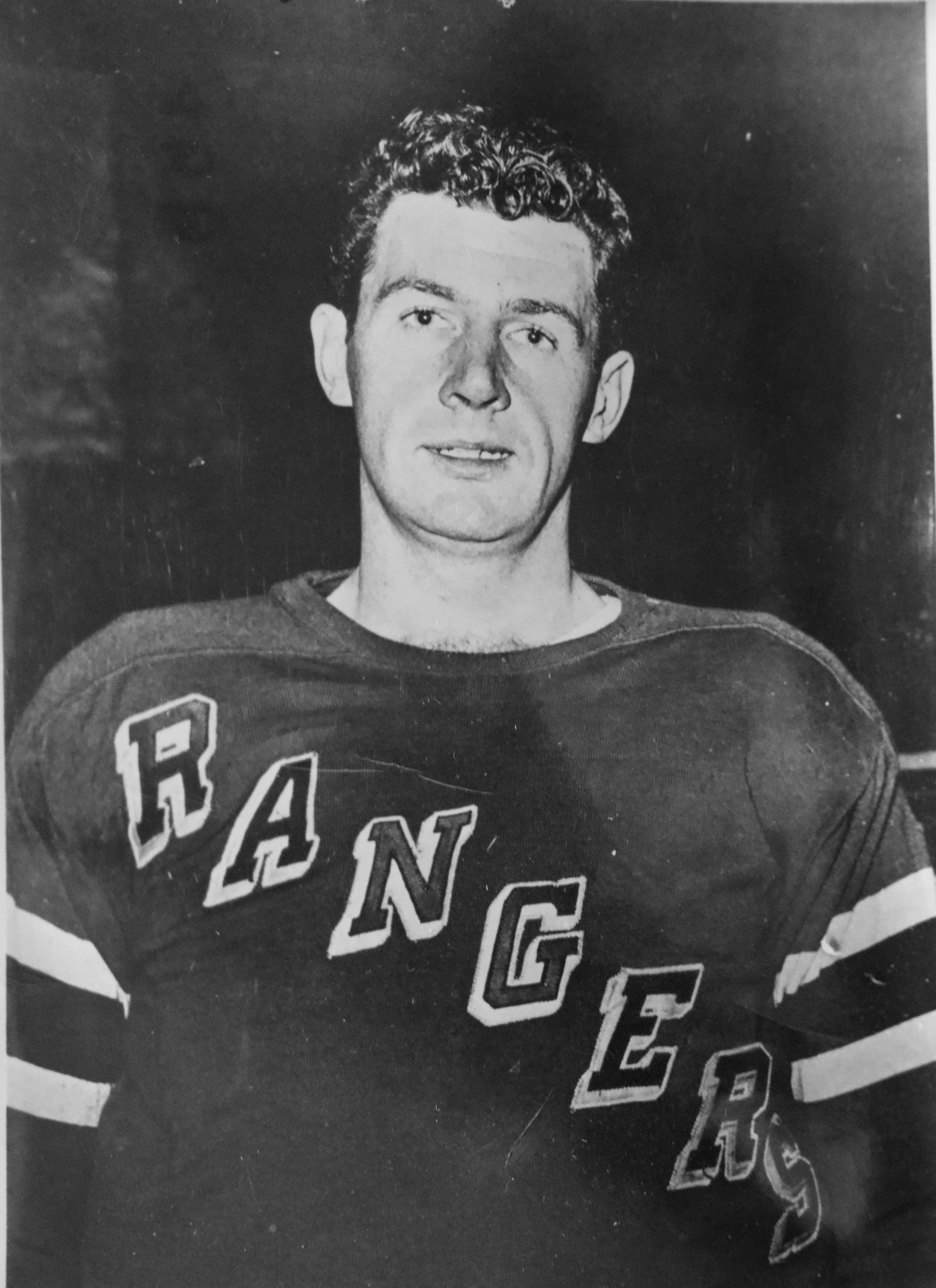
- Born: November 24, 1921 Swan River, Manitoba, Canada
- Died: March 13, 1990 (aged 68)
- Height: 5 ft 11 in (180 cm)
- Weight: 205 lb (93 kg; 14 st 9 lb)
- Position: Right Wing
- Shot: Right
- Played for: New York Rangers
- Playing career: 1942–1950

John Albert McDonald (November 24, 1921 – March 13, 1990) was a professional ice hockey player who played 43 games in the National Hockey League with the New York Rangers during the 1943–44 season.

== Early life ==
McDonald was born November 24, 1921, in Swan River, Manitoba. A high-scoring left winger, he captained the Portage Terriers during the 1939–40 and 1941–42 seasons that won the Memorial Cup. The 1942–43 season was spent with the Flin Flon Bombers of the Saskatchewan Senior Hockey League.

== Career ==
McDonald joined the New York Rangers for the 1943–44 season, one of several wartime additions. Playing in 43 NHL games, McDonald scored 10 goals and 9 assists. Persuaded to play in the Western Hockey League by Alex Shibicky, McDonald played in the west for six years.

After his hockey career, he worked for the Hudson's Bay Company as a bush pilot in Northern Manitoba and Ontario. McDonald also managed hockey rinks all over Canada. His last stop was at the Burnaby Winter Club, where he and Shibicky reunited some 30 years later and coached many players who went on to NHL careers.

== Career statistics ==
=== Regular season and playoffs ===
			Regular season					Playoffs
Season	Team	League	GP	G	A	Pts	PIM	GP	G	A	Pts	PIM
1938–39	St. John's High School	WJrHL	—	—	—	—	—	—	—	—	—	—
1939–40	Portage Terriers	MJHL	24	21	5	26	12	4	4	0	4	2
1940–41	Portage Terriers	MJHL	19	29	11	40	6	6	5	3	8	5
1941–42	Portage Terriers	MJHL	17	29	17	46	18	5	6	6	12	5
1941–42	Portage Terriers	M-Cup	—	—	—	—	—	10	18	8	26	11
1942–43	Flin Flon Bombers	SSHL	24	16	14	30	16	8	8	2	10	4
1943–44	New York Rangers	NHL	43	10	9	19	6	—	—	—	—	—
1945–46	Edmonton Flyers	WCSHL	26	24	18	42	2	6	3	1	4	2
1946–47	Portland Eagles	PCHL	60	34	26	60	40	14	7	5	12	6
1947–48	Winnipeg Eagles	Exhib	15	8	6	14	12	—	—	—	—	—
1948–49	Winnipeg Eagles	Exhib	—	—	—	—	—	—	—	—	—	—
1949–50	New Westminster Royals	PCHL	6	0	0	0	0	—	—	—	—	—
NHL totals			43	10	9	19	6	—	—	—	—	—
