= Pan-Pacific Auditorium =

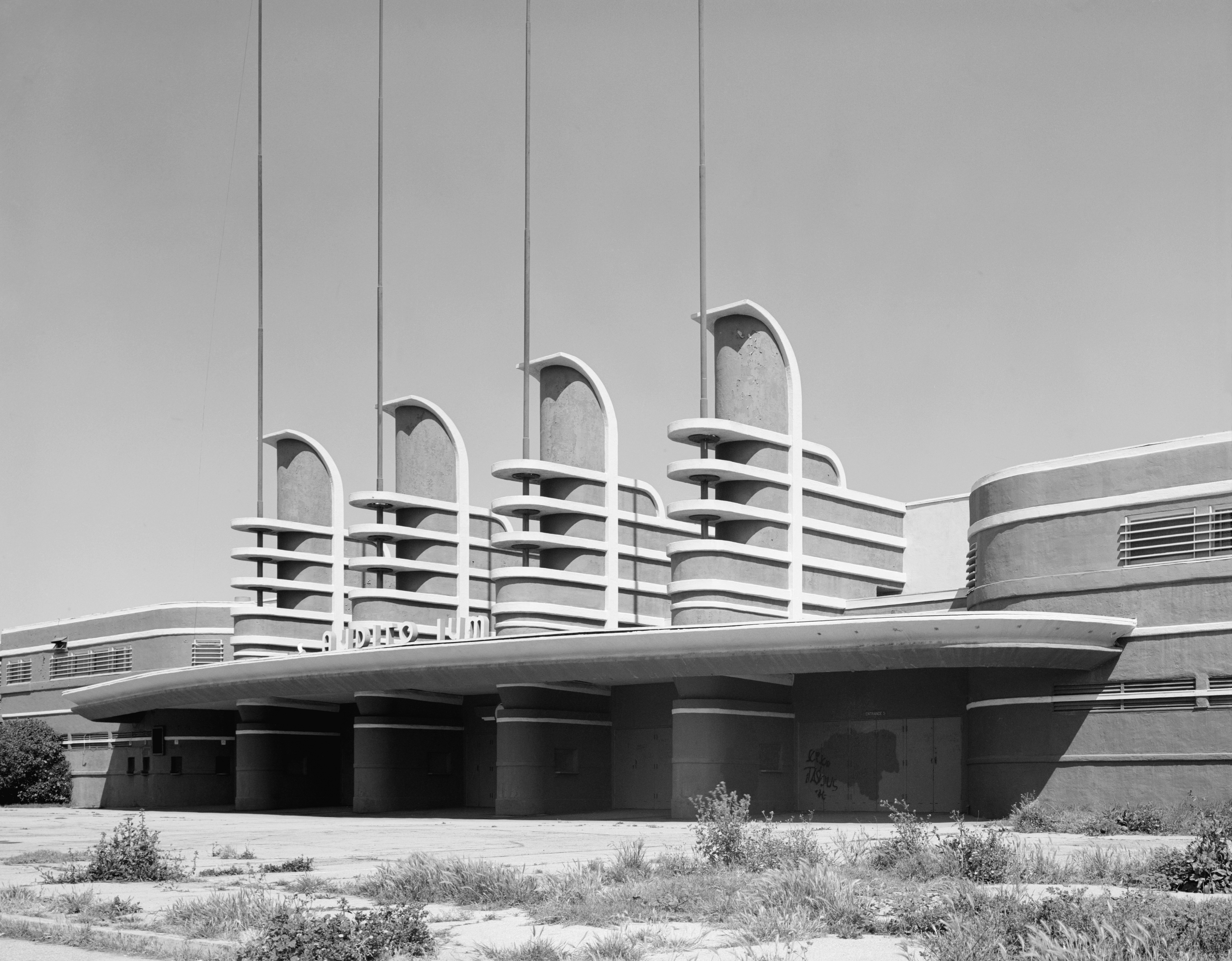
- Entrance of the Pan-Pacific Auditorium, 1970s
- Interactive map of Pan-Pacific Auditorium
- Location: 7600 W. Beverly Blvd.
- Coordinates: 34°4′31″N 118°21′15″W

Construction
- Built: 1935
- Closed: 1972
- Architect: Wurdeman & Becket

Tenants
- USC Trojans (NCAA) (1949–1959); Los Angeles Monarchs (PCHL) (1944-1950)

- Pan-Pacific Auditorium
- Formerly listed on the U.S. National Register of Historic Places
- Los Angeles Historic-Cultural Monument
- NRHP reference No.: 78000688
- LAHCM No.: 183

Significant dates
- Added to NRHP: June 16, 1978
- Designated LAHCM: March 1, 1978
- Removed from NRHP: September 27, 1989

The Pan-Pacific Auditorium was a privately owned auditorium in the Fairfax District of Los Angeles, California. Built in 1935, it stood near the site of Gilmore Field, an early Los Angeles baseball venue predating Dodger Stadium. For over 35 years it was the premier location for indoor public events in Los Angeles. The facility was closed in 1972, beginning 17 years of steady neglect and decay. In 1978, the Pan-Pacific Auditorium was included in the National Register of Historic Places, but eleven years later the sprawling wooden structure was destroyed in a fire.

== Event center ==
The Pan-Pacific Auditorium was built by event promoters Phillip and Cliff Henderson and designed by Los Angeles architects Wurdeman & Becket. It opened on May 18, 1935 for a 16-day model home exhibition. Noted as one of the finest examples of Streamline Moderne architecture in the United States, the flamboyant green and white facade faced west, was 228 feet (69 m) long and had a row of flagpoles and four stylized, upswept towers meant to evoke aircraft tails. The widely known and much photographed facade belied a modest rectilinear wooden structure resembling an overgrown gymnasium inside and out. The auditorium sprawled across 100,000 square feet (9,300 m^{2}) and had seating for up to 6,000. In 1937, the auditorium was purchased by business and real estate executive E. L. Cord. Cord would own the auditorium until his death in 1974.

Throughout the following 30 years the Pan-Pacific would host the Ice Capades and the Harlem Globetrotters, serve as home to the Hollywood Wolves and Los Angeles Monarchs of the Pacific Coast Hockey League along with UCLA ice hockey, UCLA men's basketball, USC men's basketball, car shows, political rallies and circuses. During the 1940s it was used for audience-attended national radio broadcasts and in the 1950s for televised professional wrestling shows. At its height, most major indoor events in Los Angeles were held at the Pan-Pacific.

In addition to sports, a wide variety of events were held at the Pan-Pacific. Leopold Stokowski conducted there in 1936, 1940s actress Jeanne Crain was crowned "Miss Pan Pacific" there in the early 1940s, General Dwight D. Eisenhower spoke to a beyond-capacity crowd of more than 8,500 in 1952 a month before being elected President of the United States, Elvis Presley performed there in 1957 shortly before he was drafted into the Army, and Vice President Richard Nixon addressed a national audience from the Pan-Pacific in November 1960. The building carried on as Los Angeles' primary indoor venue until the 1972 opening of the much larger Los Angeles Convention Center, after which the Auditorium was closed.

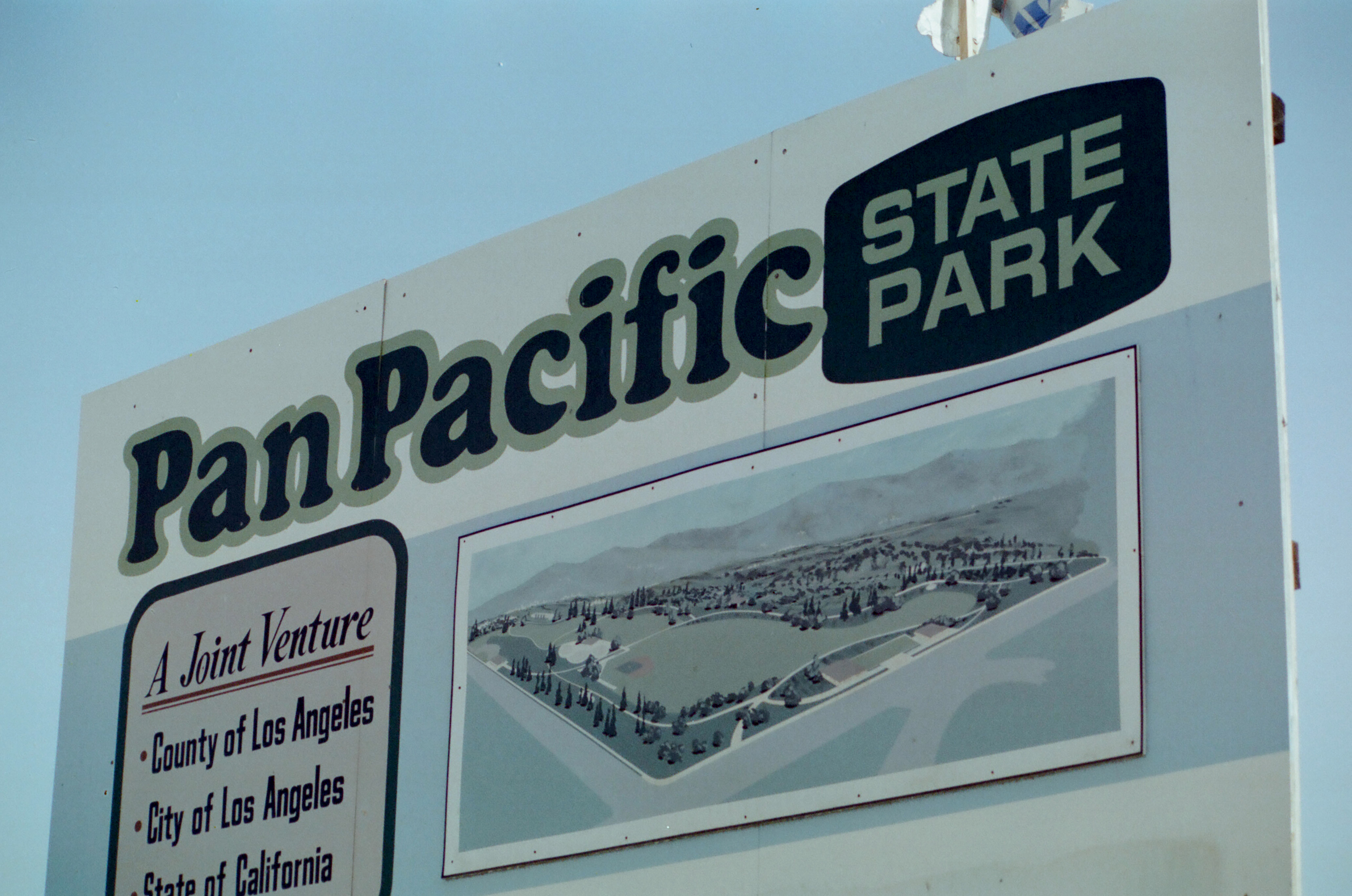
Pan Pacific State Park sign

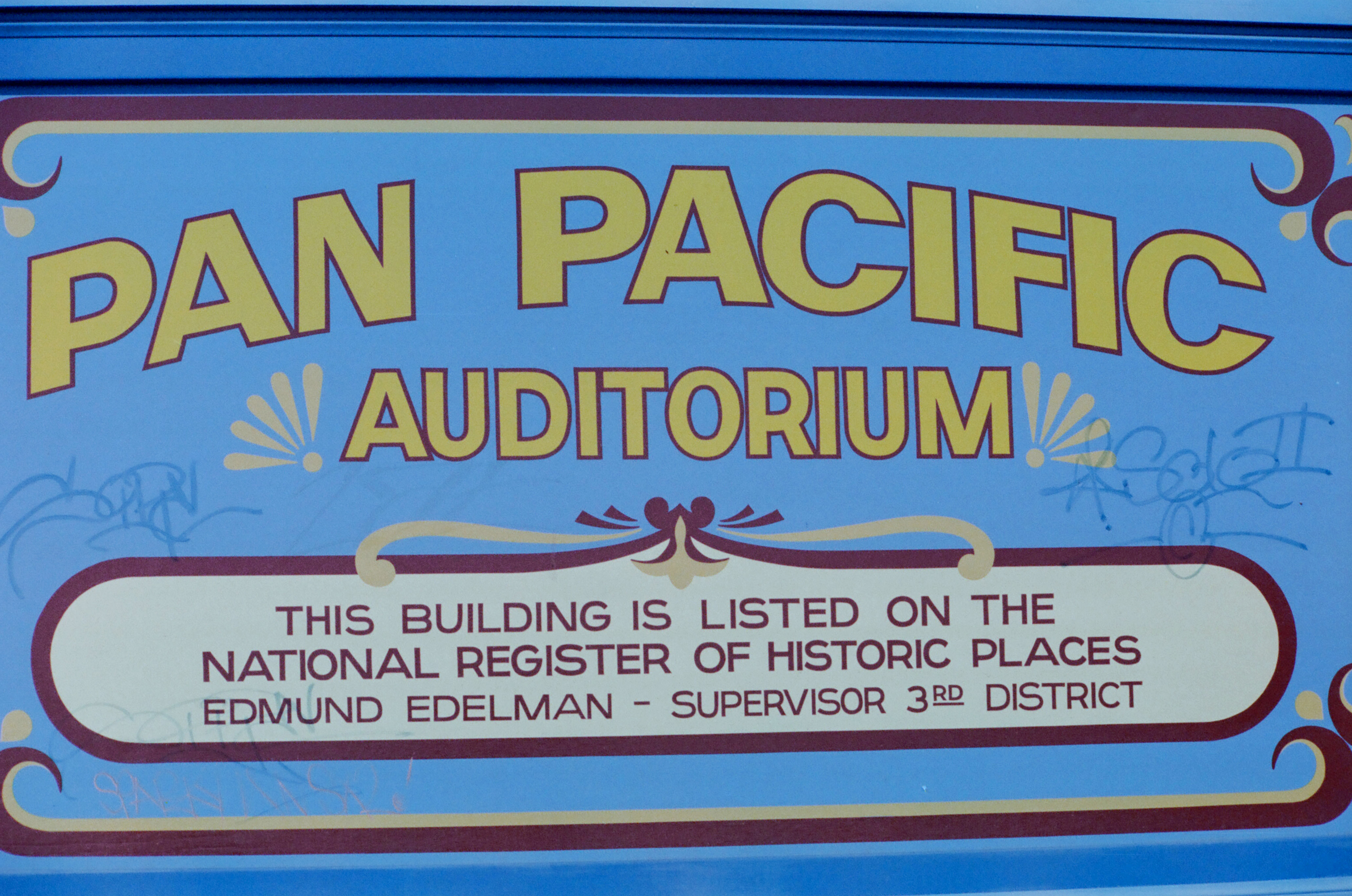
Pan Pacific Auditorium sign

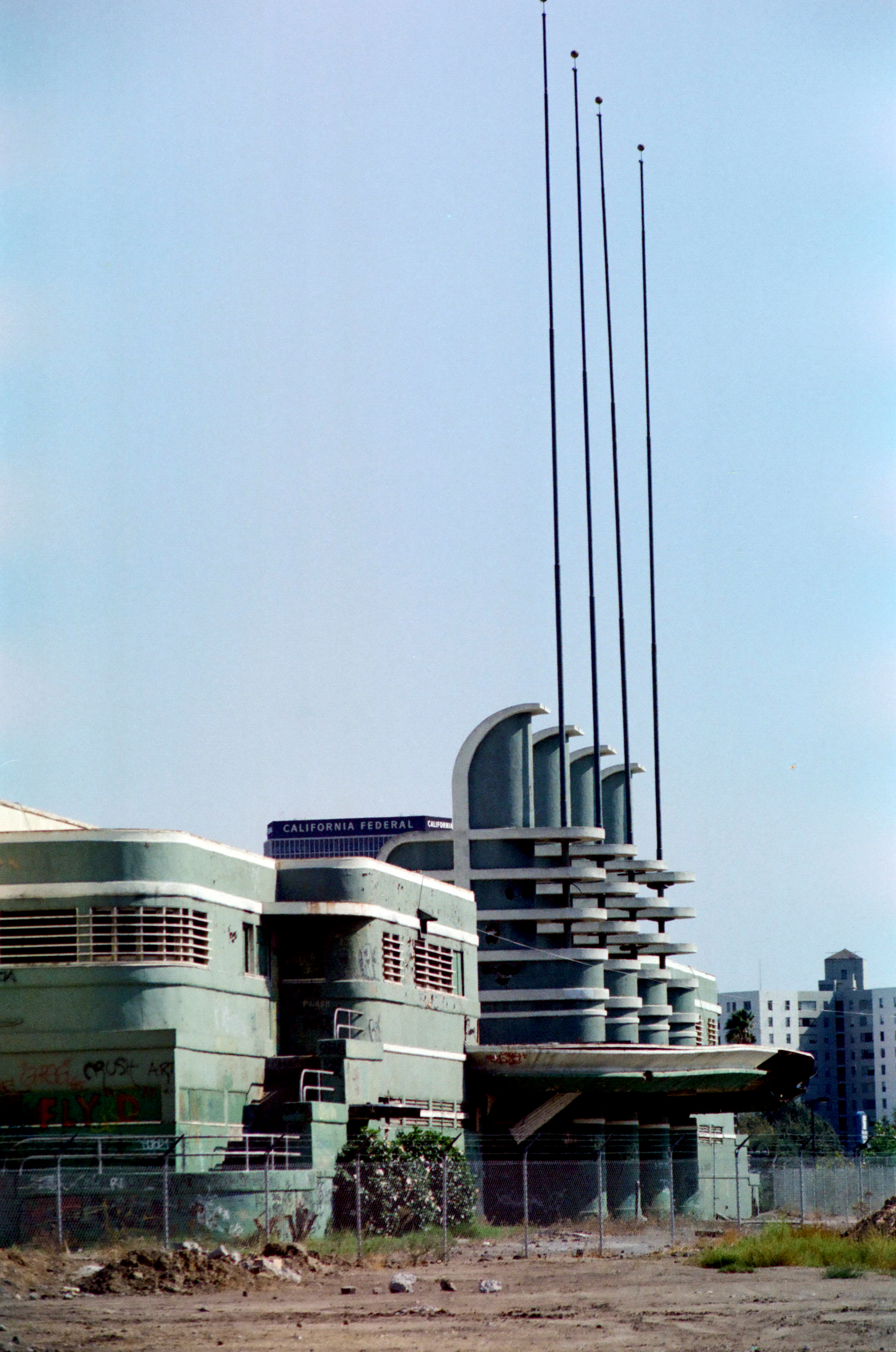
Pan-Pacific Auditorium in 1985

== Decay and fire ==
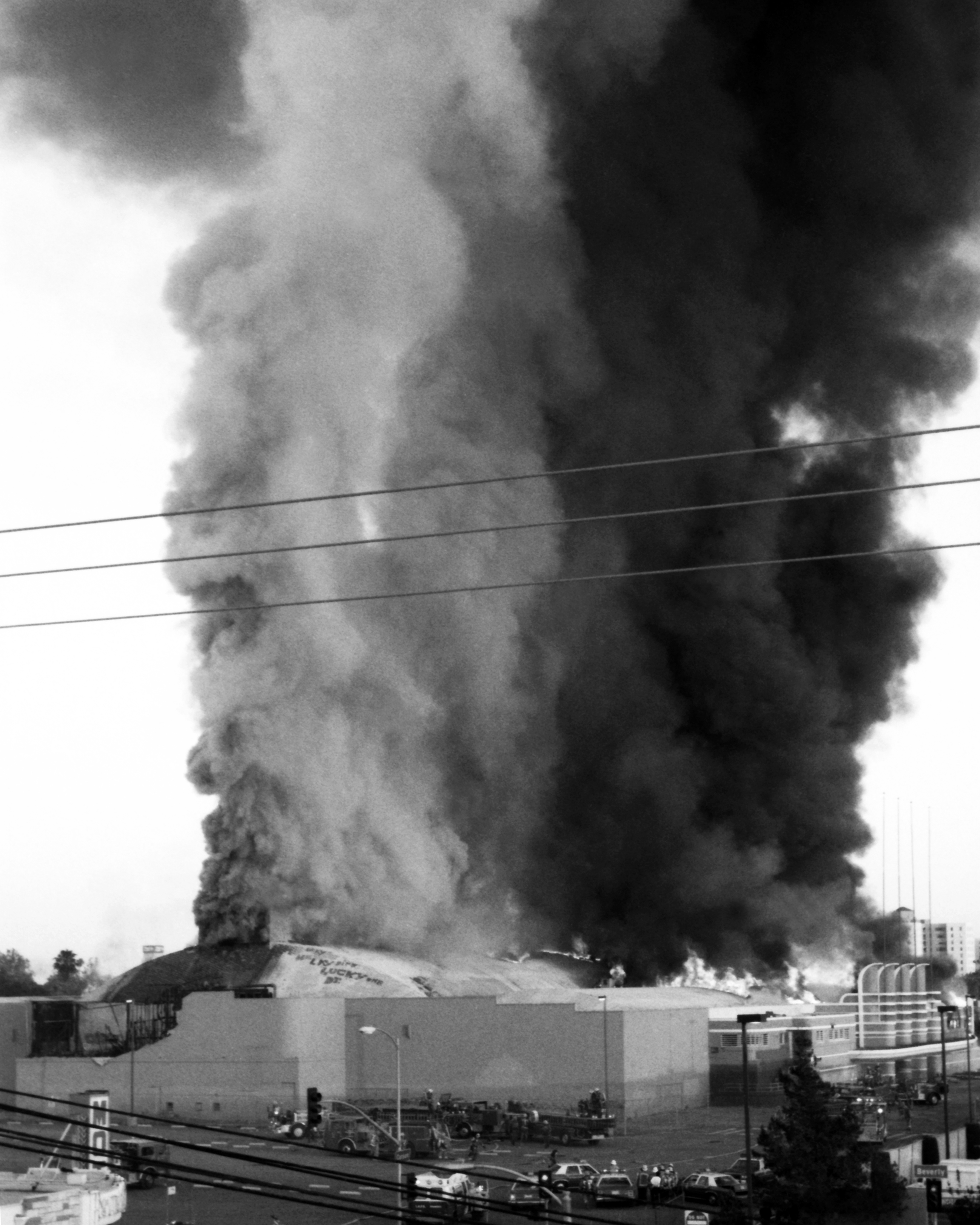
The fire of May 24, 1989

There were hopes throughout the surrounding Fairfax District of refurbishing the Pan-Pacific, possibly as an ice rink or cultural center, and the parking lot soon became a park. Interest in the building was rekindled somewhat with its 1978 inclusion in the National Register of Historic Places, but the building continued to be neglected for many years and damaged by small fires started by transients.

From the mid-1970s into the 1980s the auditorium was occasionally used for exterior shots used in film and music videos, but continued to deteriorate, mostly owing to neglect. A large loading door on the southeast corner was often forced open, allowing free access. A fire in May 1983 damaged the northern end. On the evening of May 24, 1989, the Pan-Pacific Auditorium was destroyed by a large fire, the smoke from which was visible throughout the Los Angeles basin.

The site became part of Pan Pacific Park. This urban park hosts a recreation center, opened in 2002, that is designed as a scaled-down replica of one of the famous towers.

== Pop culture ==
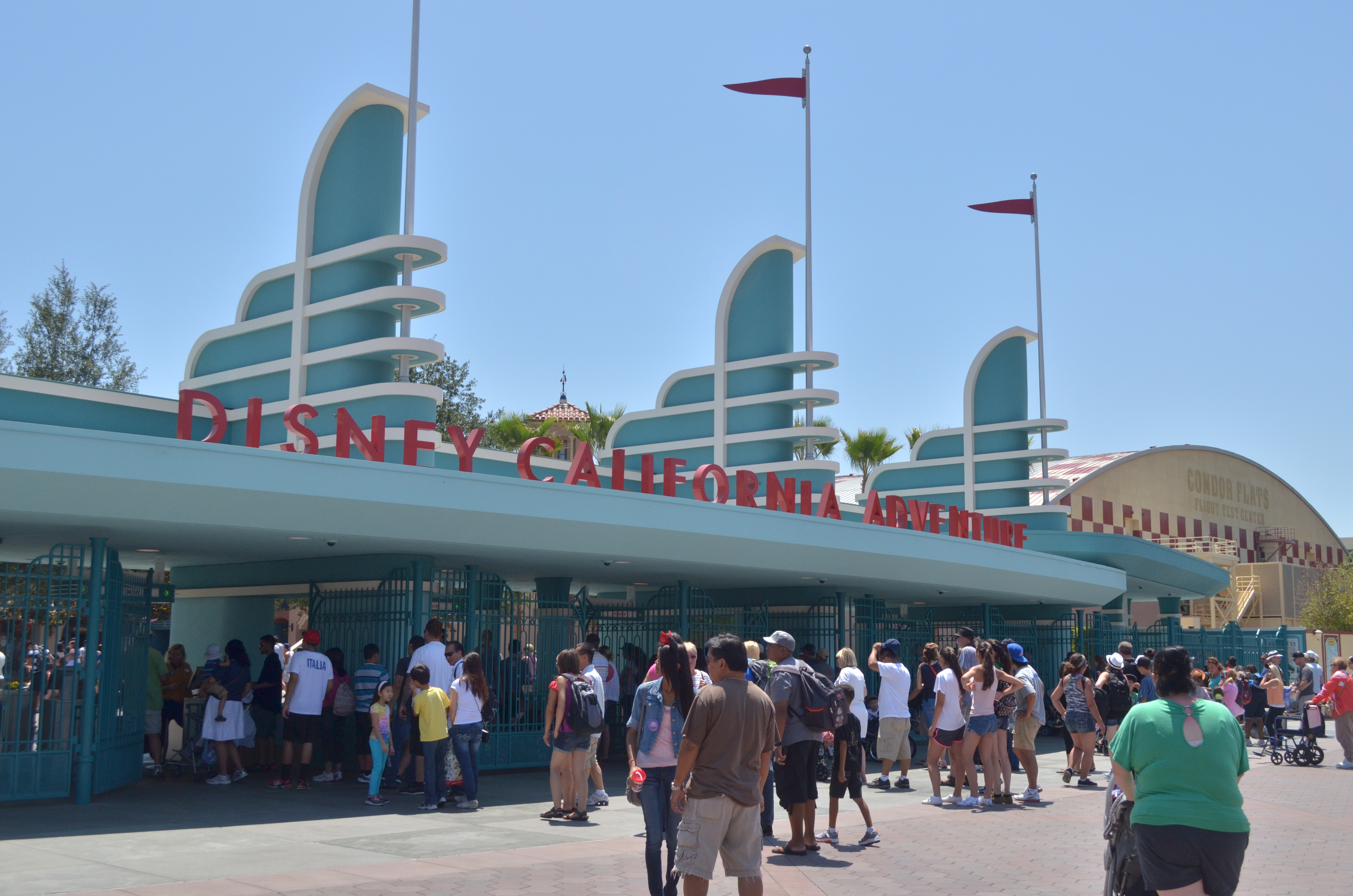
Entrance to Disney California Adventure, modeled after the Pan-Pacific Auditorium

In 1975, the Pan-Pacific made a brief appearance as the entrance to the NBC Studios in Hollywood, Florida for the movie Funny Lady.

The 1980 release of the movie musical Xanadu brought renewed hopes the building might be saved when the auditorium's facade was used to portray a dilapidated building which became a sparkling, brightly lit roller disco nightclub, but the movie was critically panned and not a box office success.

It also appears at the beginning of the 1980 music video for the Barnes & Barnes song "Fish Heads". The dilapidated façade was used in the video for "Dancing in the Sheets" by Shalamar.

The video for the 1981 Devo single, "Beautiful World" used black-and-white film footage of a man with a jet pack flying from left to right in front of the facade.

The Producers' 1982 music video "She Sheila" was partly filmed in front of the facade.

The 1984 motion picture Ghost Warrior, in which a deep-frozen 400-year-old samurai is shipped to Los Angeles, where he comes back to life, includes scenes of both the seriously decayed façade and the dimly lit interior. In the interior shots, the columns with angled knee bracing and the distinctive arched bowstring trusses are briefly visible.

Also in 1984, a music video was produced for the song "Cannonball" from Supertramp, and was filmed in the derelict Pan-Pacific Auditorium, starring actor Chris Mulkey.

The video for "She's My Girl" by The Babys featured the band playing in front of, as well as on top of the building and its iconic flagpole facades.

The music video for the 1988 song "Going Back to Cali" by LL Cool J has a black and white photograph of the building in the opening sequence.

It appeared in the 1988 movie Miracle Mile.

A nearly full-scale, stylized replica of the façade opened as the main entrance to Disney's Hollywood Studios theme park at the Walt Disney World Resort in Bay Lake, Florida on May 1, 1989, just three weeks before the original was destroyed by fire.

Disney California Adventure Park, at the Disneyland Resort, opened new entrance gates in the style of the Pan-Pacific's façade on July 15, 2011.
