= Tuten =

Tuten is a surname. Notable people with the surname include:

- Aud Tuten (1914–1994), American-born Canadian ice hockey player
- Bhayshul Tuten (born 2003), American football player
- Frederic Tuten (born 1936), American novelist, short story writer and essayist
- J. Russell Tuten (1911–1968), American politician
- Melvin Tuten (born 1971), American football player
- Rick Tuten (1965–2017), American football player
