= Southern California Hockey League =

- Sport: Ice hockey
- Founded: 1941
- Folded: 1944
- No. of teams: 3–4
- Country: United States

The Southern California Hockey League was a semi-professional ice hockey league that existed for three years during World War II. The league comprised teams in and around Los Angeles and eventually merged with the Northwest International Hockey League to form the reconstituted Pacific Coast Hockey League in 1944.

== Franchises ==
- Bakersfield Oilers (1941–1942)
- Bakersfield Army Flyers (1942–1943)
- Hollywood Wolves (1942–1944)
- Los Angeles Monarchs (1941–1944)
- Pasadena Panthers (1943–1944)
- San Diego Skyhawks (1941–1944)
