= Wurdeman & Becket =

Defunct American architectural firm

Wurdeman & Becket was an architectural firm, a partnership of Walter Wurdeman, Welton Becket and Charles F. Plummer. The Moderne Pan-Pacific Auditorium, dating from 1935, brought them local fame.

Besides those works ascribed to Mr. Wurdemann and Mr. Becket as individuals, those ascribed to the firm include:

- Bullock's Pasadena
- Bullock's Palm Springs
- General Petroleum Building
- Jones Dog & Cat Hospital Building
- Museum Square
- Panorama City, Los Angeles - master plan
- The Post-war House
- Murphy's Ranch (1933-1934)
- Clifton's Brookdale Cafeteria (1935)
- Pan-Pacific Auditorium (1935) LAHCM No. 183, NRHP No. 78000688
- Plymouth Apartments (1936), LAHCM No. 970
