= Al Leader =

Canadian-American ice hockey player (1903–1982)

George Alfred Leader
- Born: December 4, 1903; Barnsley, Manitoba, Canada
- Died: May 8, 1982 (aged 78)
- Occupations: Ice hockey player, referee, and administrator

George Alfred "Al" Leader (December 4, 1903 – May 8, 1982) was a Canadian-American ice hockey player, referee, and administrator. He is a member of the Hockey Hall of Fame in the "Builder" category. Leader settled in Seattle, Washington, in the 1930s and became involved in hockey as the administrator of the Seattle City League. He worked as a player, referee, and administrator at the city level for several years before organizing the Defense Hockey League in 1940, which involved five teams from Seattle and Portland, Oregon.

In 1944, Leader was elected as the secretary-manager of the Pacific Coast Hockey League. Throughout the decade, Leader worked to manage and promote amateur hockey on the west coast, also taking on an administrative role with the Amateur Hockey Association of the United States. In 1952, the Pacific Coast Hockey League became part of the now defunct professional Western Hockey League and Leader became the league president. He served in this capacity until 1969, and was elected to the Hockey Hall of Fame in the same year.
