= Oakland Oaks (ice hockey) =

- City: Oakland, California
- League: Pacific Coast Hockey League
- Operated: 1944–1949
- Home arena: Winterland Arena, San Francisco
- Owner: Eddie Shore (1948–1949)
- Head coach: Denny Edge (1944–45)

The Oakland Oaks were a minor professional ice hockey team based in Oakland, California that played in the Pacific Coast Hockey League from the 1944–45 season into the 1949–50 season. The team did not complete its final season, folding in December 1949. The team played its home games at Winterland Arena in San Francisco, a venue it shared with the San Francisco Shamrocks.

The team's coach for its first season was Denny Edge, who had previously coached the Gonzaga Bulldogs men's ice hockey team. Hockey Hall of Fame inductee Eddie Shore bought the team for $50,000 in May 1948 and owned it through closure. In its six-season history, the team compiled a record of 131–143–10.
