= Pasadena Panthers =

- City: Pasadena, California
- League: Southern California Hockey League; Pacific Coast Hockey League
- Founded: 1943
- Folded: 1945

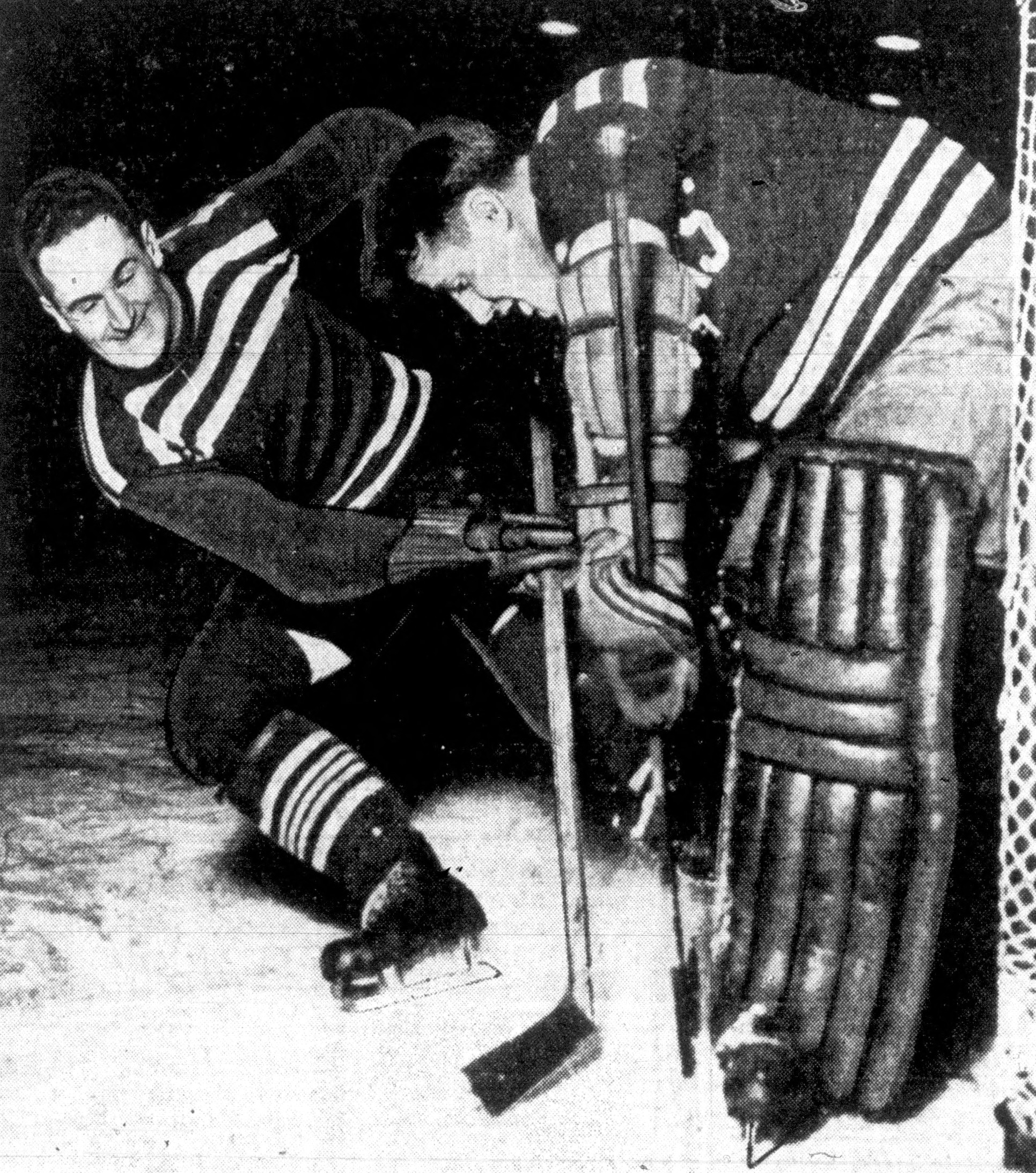
Charlie Sands (left) and George Caron (right) as members of the Pasadena Panthers

The Pasadena Panthers were an amateur ice hockey team from Pasadena, California, United States. Originally members of the Southern California Hockey League, the team was among the clubs who formed a reconstituted Pacific Coast Hockey League in 1944.

== History ==
Pasadena was formed in 1943, replacing the Bakersfield Army Flyers in the Southern California Hockey League (SCHL).. Due to the persistence of World War II, the team could only schedule 18 games during the season and the roster was outfitted by players who sitting out the war for various reasons. The Panthers managed to win just one of their games but the lack of success did not immediately doom the team. After the season, the league joined with other teams to the north to form the third iteration of the Pacific Coast Hockey League. Led by player/coach Charlie Sands, the team performed better than they had the previous season but still ended up last in the league. After the year the Panthers were disbanded. A team with an identical name later came into existence but had no formal connection with this franchise.

== Year-by-year results ==
League	Season	GP	W	L	T	Pts	Finish	Coach(es)	Postseason
SCHL	1943–44	18	1	16	1	3	4th	Charlie Sands	—
PCHL	1944–45	18	4	13	1	9	10th	Charlie Sands	—

== Notable players ==
- Jack Howard
- James Jamieson
- Charlie Sands
