= Hollywood Wolves =

American minor league hockey team

- City: Hollywood, California
- League: SCHL (1942–1944); PCHL (1944–1947)
- Operated: 1942–1947
- Home arena: Pan-Pacific Ice Arena
- Colors: Blue, red, white

Franchise history
- 1942–1944: Hollywood Wolves (SCHL)
- 1944–1947: Hollywood Wolves (PCHL)

Championships
- Regular season titles: none
- Division titles: none
- Playoff championships: 1 (1943–44; SCHL)

The Hollywood Wolves were a Los Angeles-based minor-league hockey team that played in the Southern California Hockey League (1941–1944) and the Pacific Coast Hockey League (1944–1952). The team defeated the Boston Olympics in 1944 for the championship of the Amateur Hockey Association of the United States, the first team to hold an American national championship in hockey.

The Wolves were a Toronto Maple Leafs' minor league affiliate from 1944 until 1947, and shared an arena with the PCHL's Los Angeles Monarchs.

== Notable players ==
- "Cowboy" Tom Anderson, Scottish-born defenceman won the National Hockey League (NHL)'s Hart Trophy as the league's MVP in 1941-42 and later finished his career with the Wolves
- Bill Barilko, defenceman, scored game-winning overtime goal in the 1951 Stanley Cup Final for Toronto Maple Leafs
- Bob Gracie, forward, played 378 games in the NHL from 1930 to 1939
- Ivan "Ching" Johnson, defenceman, played over 400 games over twelve seasons with New York Rangers
- Eric "Doc" Prentice, forward, played five games with Toronto Maple Leafs
