= San Diego Skyhawks =

Former hockey team in San Diego, California

- City: San Diego, California
- League: SCHL (1941–44); PCHL (1944–50)
- Founded: 1941
- Folded: 1950
- Home arena: Glacier Gardens
- Colours: Red, blue and white
- Owners: Jim Forsyth, Bret Forsyth and the Buffalo Bisons
- Parent club: Buffalo Bisons (AHL)

The San Diego Skyhawks were a professional ice hockey team based in San Diego, California. Founded in 1941 as members of the Southern California Hockey League (SCHL), the team joined the Pacific Coast Hockey League (PCHL) in 1944. The team played at the professional level until 1950. The Skyhawks played their final season, 1950–51, in the Southern California Amateur Hockey Association (SCAHA). The team played its home games at Glacier Gardens. The Skyhawks won the 1948–49 Phil Henderson Cup.

== History ==
The Skyhawks were the farm team for the Buffalo Bisons of the American Hockey League from 1947 to 1950. The Bisons owned half of the San Diego franchise along with brothers Jim and Bret Forsyth. Bret, who was an employee at Boeing, purchased an aircraft from the company to ferry his team to away games. Those travel accommodations were a rarity at the time, even at the highest level of sports, as most teams relied on bus and train transportation.

Al Chapman, general manager of the Buffalo Bisons, announced in May 1950 that Buffalo would not continue to finance the San Diego PCHL franchise for the upcoming 1950–51 season. Chapman stated that the Bisons had been taking losses for the last two season, in spite of the Skyhawks' Phil Henderson Cup victory in 1949. Buffalo searched for local investment to keep the team alive in the PCHL to no avail. The Skyhawks informed the PCHL they were withdrawing their membership on May 16, 1950. The rights of the players San Diego had on assignment from Buffalo were transferred to the Seattle Ironmen for the 1950–51 PCHL season.

== Skyhawks who played in the NHL ==
- Hugh Currie
- Joffre Desilets
- Sam LoPresti
- Larry Thibeault
- Aud Tuten
- Don Webster
- Len Wharton

== Season-by-season records ==
| Season | League | GP | W | L | T | Win% | PTS | GF | GA | Coach | Playoffs |
| 1941–42 | SCHL | no info available | | | | | | | | | |
| 1942–43 | SCHL | 16 | 13 | 3 | 0 | .813 | no info available | | | | |
| 1943–44 | SCHL | 18 | 12 | 5 | 1 | .694 | 25 | 89 | 76 | Larry Bots | lost in first round |
| 1944–45 | PCHL | 18 | 11 | 7 | 0 | .611 | 22 | 106 | 80 | Al Papike | no info available |
| 1945–46 | PCHL | 40 | 21 | 19 | 0 | .525 | 42 | 145 | 139 | Al McFadzen | lost in first round |
| 1946–47 | PCHL | 60 | 33 | 26 | 1 | .558 | 67 | 194 | 160 | Paul Runge | lost in first round |
| 1947–48 | PCHL | 66 | 32 | 31 | 3 | .508 | 67 | 242 | 258 | George Boothman | lost in championship |
| 1948–49 | PCHL | 70 | 32 | 35 | 3 | .479 | 67 | 249 | 275 | Ducky Skinner | won Phil Henderson Cup |
| 1949–50 | PCHL | 70 | 27 | 33 | 10 | .457 | 64 | 211 | 236 | Ducky Skinner | lost in second round |
