= 1942 Memorial Cup =

Canadian junior ice hockey championship

The Memorial Cup trophy

The 1942 Memorial Cup final was the 24th junior ice hockey championship of the Canadian Amateur Hockey Association (CAHA). The George Richardson Memorial Trophy champions Oshawa Generals of the Ontario Hockey Association in Eastern Canada competed against the Abbott Cup champions Portage la Prairie Terriers of the Manitoba Junior Hockey League in Western Canada. In a best-of-five series, held at Shea's Amphitheatre in Winnipeg, Manitoba, Portage la Prairie won their 1st Memorial Cup, defeating Oshawa 3 games to 1.

== History ==
Quebec Amateur Hockey Association (QAHA) president Norman Dawe sought for teams from Eastern Canada to have more home games during the Memorial Cup playoffs. At the CAHA general meeting in April 1941, his motion was approved to allow the eastern and western portions of the national playoffs to be handled by the respective CAHA branches. Despite the approval, the CAHA had expressed concerns about the low gate receipts at the Montreal Forum, compared to expected profits elsewhere, and reserved the right to change the location of the games. The CAHA sought to maximize its profits, which were reinvested into minor ice hockey in Canada.

Dawe supported a proposal to form an Eastern Canada Hockey Association in May 1941, for the sake of the playoffs. Under the proposal, the QAHA, the Ottawa and District Amateur Hockey Association, and the Maritime Amateur Hockey Association, would work together in the playoffs to determine one team to play against the Ontario champion; and share the profits from the gate receipts among themselves before the CAHA took its share. Dawe stated that the proposal may seem like mutiny, but that the QAHA wanted to form a new association within the CAHA, and voice Eastern Canada's concerns. The QAHA also contested that with more playoffs games, Montreal could be built into a junior hockey city with profitable gate receipts.

In the playoffs, the Montreal Royals defeated the Halifax Junior Canadians by a 12–3 score in the first game of a best-of-three series at Montreal Forum. The remainder of series was cancelled due to poor attendance and gate receipts. The Halifax team claimed that they were treated poorly and vowed never to return, since they were not given any accommodations or travel expenses. Dawe denied that it was the QAHA's responsibility to provide expenses, or that any communication had been received from Halifax or the CAHA on the matter. Toby Sexsmith and other members of the 21st Manitoba Legislature declined to sit in a nighttime session while the Terriers were in the playoffs. The session was adjourned as many members had tickets to the games.

== Scores ==
- Game 1: Portage la Prairie 5-1 Oshawa
- Game 2: Portage la Prairie 8-7 Oshawa
- Game 3: Oshawa 8-4 Portage la Prairie
- Game 4: Portage la Prairie 8-2 Oshawa

== Winning roster ==
Gordon Bell, Joe Bell, Lin Bend, Don Campbell, Billy Gooden, Bill Heindl, Bobby Love, Jack McDonald, Jack O'Reilly, Bud Ritchie, Lloyd Smith, Wally Stefanew. Coach: Addie Bell
