= Gonzaga Bulldogs men's ice hockey =

- University: Gonzaga University
- Conference: Pacific Coast Conference
- First season: 1936–37
- Arena: Eagles Ice Arena; Spokane, Washington
- Colors: Navy blue, white, and red

Conference regular season champions
- PCC: 1938, 1939

The Gonzaga Bulldogs men's ice hockey team is a college ice hockey program that represents Gonzaga University. They are a member of the American Collegiate Hockey Association at the Division II level and are former members of the Pacific Coast Conference. The university sponsored varsity ice hockey from 1936 to 1940.

== History ==
Rev. Paul Corkery S.J. wanted to attract more Canadians to Gonzaga so in 1936 the university began sponsoring ice hockey as a varsity sport. After a year the team was established enough to join the Pacific Coast Conference (PCC) along with other west-coast clubs like UCLA, USC and Washington. Gonzaga also played jointly in the West Kootenai Hockey Association along with semi-professional teams from Canada. Gonzaga swiftly became one of the top teams in the PCC, winning the conference championship in each of its first two years. Gonzaga lore has the team defeating a visiting Minnesota squad by an 18–2 score, however no mention of such a result exists in Minnesota's records. (Note: Gonzaga did defeat Minnesota by a 5–1 score in a game played on March 29, 1938, in Spokane.)

In 1940, Gonzaga was one of the top collegiate team in the country, going undefeated against all other colleges until losing to Toronto in the final game of the International Collegiate Championships. Gonzaga ended their program after the 1939–40 season, citing the financial drain of the program. Costs would likely have increased as most of the other PCC teams ended their programs within two years. Gonzaga's legacy, however, continued after the team was shuttered; starting goaltender Frank McCool played briefly in the NHL, winning the 1945 Calder Memorial Trophy and helping the Toronto Maple Leafs capture the Stanley Cup the same year. Another alumnus, Cheddy Thompson, would have a spectacular career as a coach with Colorado College, leading the team to a National Championship in 1950 and winning the National Coach of the Year in 1952.

Gonzaga attempted to revive the team as a varsity sport in the 1960s, but after two years the effort was abandoned and the team remained a club sport.

== Season-by-season results ==
=== Varsity ===
NCAA D-I Champions	NCAA Frozen Four	Conference Regular Season Champions	Conference Playoff Champions

Season	Conference	Regular Season (Note: Code explanation; GP—Games Played, W—Wins, L—Losses, T—Tied games, Pts—Points)											Conference Tournament Results	National Tournament Results
Season	Conference	Conference						Overall					Conference Tournament Results	National Tournament Results
Season	Conference	GP	W	L	T	Pts*	Finish	GP	W	L	T	%	Conference Tournament Results	National Tournament Results
1936–37	Independent	–	–	–	–	–	–	–	–	–	–	–		
Denny Edge (1937–1940)
1937–38	PCC	–	–	–	–	–	1st	21	15	3	3	.786		
1938–39	PCC	–	–	–	–	–	1st	13	6	7	0	.462		
1939–40	PCC	–	–	–	–	–	–	10	6	3	1	.650		
Totals								GP	W	L	T	%	Championships	
Regular Season								–	–	–	–	–		
Conference Post-season								–	–	–	–	–		
NCAA Post-season								–	–	–	–	–		
Regular Season and Post-season Record								–	–	–	–	–		

Note: Denny Edge became the team's coach in late December 1937.

== Bulldogs in the NHL ==
= NHL All-Star team	= NHL All-Star (Note: Players are identified as an All-Star if they were selected for the All-Star game at any time in their career.)	= NHL All-Star and NHL All-Star team	= Hall of Famers

Player	Position	Team(s)	Years	Games	Stanley Cups
Frank McCool	Goaltender	TOR	1944–1946	72	1
