= Los Angeles Monarchs =

American ice hockey team from 1944 to 1950

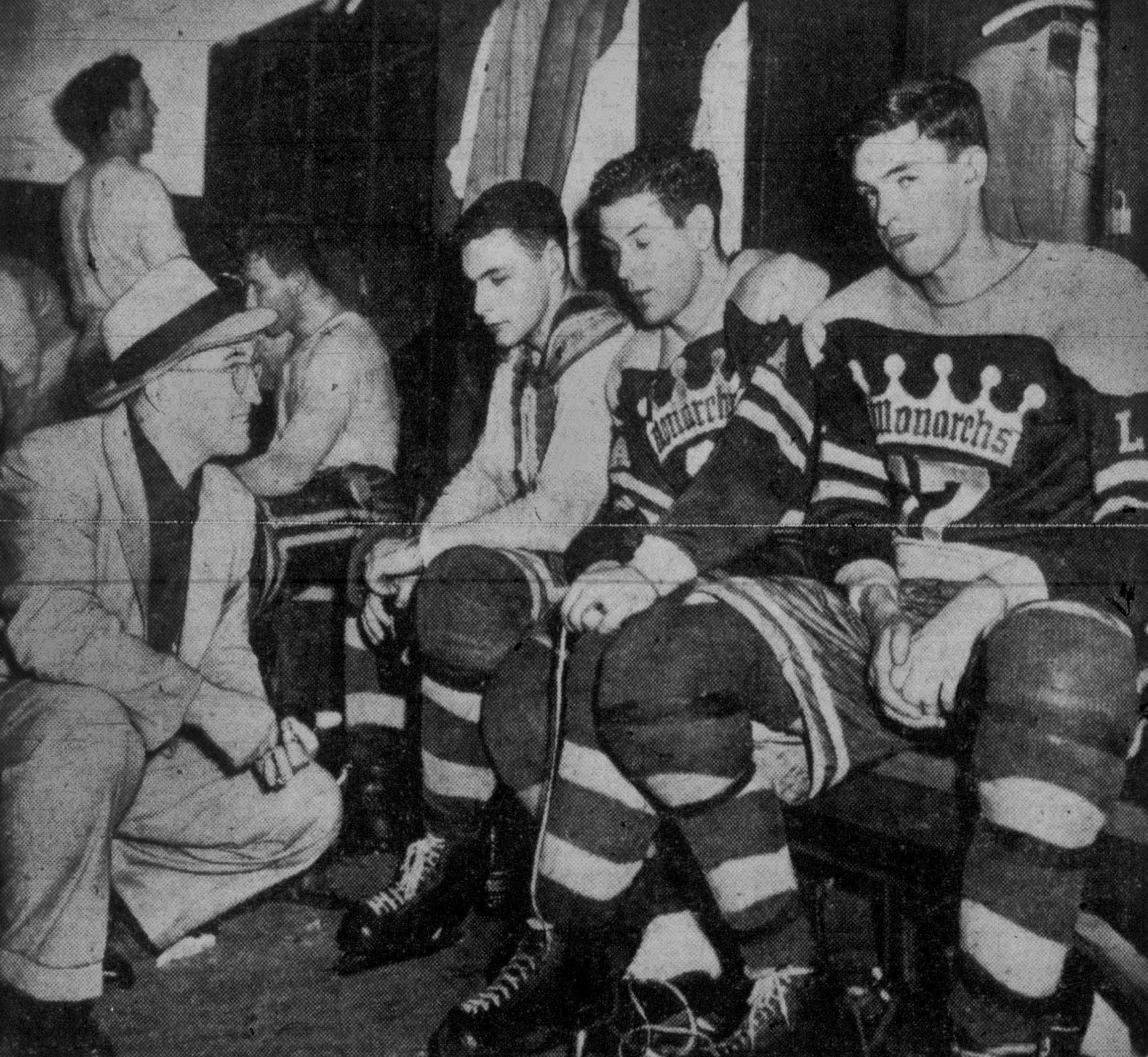
Los Angeles Monarchs coach Dutch Hiller (far left) talking to players (from left to right) Gene Robinson, Bob Robertson and Jack Meldrum, circa 1950.

The Los Angeles Monarchs were a professional ice hockey team, active from 1944–1950, in the Pacific Coast Hockey League (PCHL). The Monarchs are the first professional ice hockey team to win a league championship for the city of Los Angeles. They played in the southern division of the PCHL, alongside teams from the neighboring cities such as the Pasadena Panthers, the Hollywood Wolves, and the San Diego Skyhawks. The southern division also included the San Francisco Shamrocks, Oakland Oaks and, in 1947, the Fresno Falcons.

The Monarchs played their home games in the Pan Pacific Auditorium, which was located on Beverly Boulevard, next to the Hollywood Stars baseball field, Gilmore Field. The auditorium was also near Gilmore Stadium where football and midget auto races were held. Gilmore Stadium was the home field for the Loyola Marymount University football team and several professional football teams, including the Los Angeles Bulldogs, Los Angeles Mustangs and the Hollywood Bears, on Los Angeles's Westside. As ice hockey was a new sport in Southern California, the team enjoyed a decent amount of popularity during its tenure in Los Angeles.

== Early L.A. Monarchs hockey clubs ==
The first Los Angeles Monarchs team was part of the Pacific Hockey League (PHL) in the 1920s. The PHL was more of an amateur-level league made up of young and old players from Canada and the Northeastern United States. The teams were formed by local athletic clubs and league games were more like weekend recreational games, rather than a competition of professional contenders. By 1929, at the dawn of the Great Depression, most of the teams folded. Only a few schools, most notably the University of Southern California, the University of California, Los Angeles and Loyola Marymount University still supported local hockey programs.

Beginning in 1930, after a large ice arena was built in Sacramento, California, attempts were made to re-form the league, but poor economic conditions and a shortage of ice arenas stymied attempts and forced hockey organizations to compete on an amateur local level. Most clubs still in existence were either from colleges or small athletic associations. Since ice arenas were in short supply, games were played late at night and fan support was small.

It wasn’t until 1938, with the opening of the Pan Pacific Auditorium, that a new Los Angeles Monarchs team emerged. The Pan Pacific was capable of seating 6200 spectators for ice hockey games. The Monarchs shared the arena with the Hollywood Wolves and Pasadena Panthers. With three viable teams competing in Los Angeles, other teams in San Francisco, Sacramento, and Fresno joined to recreate the PHL. But the league was short-lived and again folded after the 1941 season.

== Los Angeles joins the Pacific Coast Hockey League ==
The Pacific Coast Hockey League (PCHL) existed twice before, from 1928 to 1931, and from 1936 to 1941. The league first folded due to the Great Depression. In 1941, U.S. and Canadian involvement in World War II forced it to shut down. The teams were all based in Western Canada and the U.S. Pacific Northwest.

In 1944, as signs indicated the war would be ending soon, and citizens would be able to resume normal life again, league owners decided to start the PCHL back up again. The Monarchs joined the reborn PCHL in 1944. By this time there was a much larger number of people living in Southern California – in order to support the war industries and military bases – who had transplanted from the northeast U.S., where hockey was very popular. These transplants created a much larger demand for ice hockey entertainment. The league wanted to expand south and take advantage of the growing economic and hockey fan base in California. Combined with the availability of larger ice rinks like the Pan Pacific (in Los Angeles) and the Cow Palace (in South San Francisco), ice hockey games could be offered to spectators in larger numbers and at more convenient hours.

== Bringing Los Angeles its first hockey championship ==
The Monarchs were competitive during their years in the PCHL. Playing the majority of their games within their region reduced travel strains and helped keep the team better rested for play. Games results do reveal how travel affected the team, with most of its biggest losses coming on the road. The Monarchs won the President’s Cup for the league championship on April 5, 1947.

The Monarch's championship title had some controversy, however, due to an illegal goaltender substitution earlier in the playoffs. While facing their cross-town rival Hollywood Wolves, in game four of the best-of-five Southern Division title series, the Monarchs lost their goaltender to injury. The Monarchs then borrowed San Diego Skyhawk goaltender Ron Pickell to face the Wolves in game four. Professional hockey etiquette of that period mandated a team to get their opponent's approval of borrowing a player from another team – especially from a team that was also in the playoffs. The Monarchs picked up Pickell without doing this.

The goalie substitution incident was soon forgotten once the Monarchs eliminated the Wolves. They then went on to sweep the Portland Eagles, four games to none, in the PCHL final and won the President's Cup. After winning the PCHL championship they traveled east to face the minor league champion Boston Olympics for the U.S. Amateur Cup. The Monarchs lost that series but gained great respect among fans and peers in the hockey world. They almost won the President's Cup (now called the Lester Patrick Cup and awarded to the Western Hockey League champion) again in 1950 before losing in the final to the New Westminster Royals.

== Professional hockey leaves L.A ==
As ice hockey was in its infancy in California during the 1940s, most of the teams had trouble breaking even financially. Monarchs owner Charlie Cord, however, did well financially. When facing local rivals like the Hollywood Wolves, Pasadena Panthers, and San Diego Skyhawks, the Monarchs often filled the 6200 seats in the Pan Pacific arena. Gate receipts were the mainstay of paying players and keeping the team financially afloat.

However, when the U.S. economy took a downturn in 1949, fewer fans had extra cash to go watch live hockey. As a result, every team in the league suffered during the 1949–50 season. Things started to unravel when the Fresno Falcons decided to fold after the 1950 season, and the San Diego Skyhawks were considering the same. The Monarchs had already lost their cross-town rivals in Pasadena (1945) and in Hollywood (1947). The Monarchs needed opponents based close to Los Angeles. The team was financially strong enough to continue in the league, in spite of the fact that they faced a more grueling road schedule playing teams in the Pacific Northwest.

Jet travel was not yet common and the team mostly traveled by bus. Facing the prospect of having to travel by bus to the San Francisco Bay Area and the Northwest for all of their road games, Monarchs owners scrambled to find venture capital willing to land teams in San Bernardino and Bakersfield. However, those towns were too small and lacked the necessary capital to support new teams, especially during an economic down turn. Therefore, the northern division team owners did not want to commit to the expense and trouble of traveling to Southern California to face one team several times in a season. So, the fate of the Monarchs – and hockey in L.A. – relied upon the PCHL board of governors.

After meeting on August 30, 1950, the PCHL board decided to disband the Southern Division, and not keep the Monarchs in the league. After the 1951-52 season, the league changed its name to the Western Hockey League to reflect the addition of teams from the Canadian prairies. Hockey fans in Los Angeles had to wait until 1961 to get another hockey team. That was when the PCHL’s descendant, the Western Hockey League (WHL) expanded south and added the Los Angeles Blades.

So notable is the Monarchs' legacy that when the National Hockey League decided to expand to include a team in Los Angeles in 1967, the Los Angeles franchise would become known as the Kings.
