= Pacific Coast Hockey League =

US / Canadian ice hockey league

The Pacific Coast Hockey League was an ice hockey minor league with teams in the western United States and western Canada that existed in three incarnations: from 1928 to 1931, from 1936 to 1941, and from 1944 to 1952.

== PCHL 1928–1931 ==
The first incarnation of the PCHL had four teams and lasted three seasons. Brothers Frank Patrick and Lester Patrick, financed by their wealthy lumberman father Joseph Patrick, founded it and operated franchises in Vancouver and Victoria, with Frank, one of the founders of the earlier Pacific Coast Hockey Association (PCHA) as president. The Vancouver Lions won the league's championship all three seasons and played in all five seasons of the second version of the league, winning its final two championships in 1940 and 1941. The Victoria Cubs' arena, Patrick Arena, was destroyed by fire in 1929, after which the club continued for one season as a traveling team before being moved to Tacoma, Washington, to become the Tacoma Tigers.

=== Teams ===
- Portland Buckaroos (1928–1931)
- Seattle Eskimos (1928–1931)
- Tacoma Tigers (1930–1931)
- Vancouver Lions (1928–1931)
- Victoria Cubs (1928–1930)

=== Champions ===
- 1929: Vancouver Lions
- 1930: Vancouver Lions
- 1931: Vancouver Lions

== PCHL 1936–1941 ==
From 1932 to 1935, no league called the PCHL existed, although teams from the first PCHL joined the Western Canada Hockey League or the North West Hockey League. In 1936, the Portland, Seattle, and Vancouver franchises of the North West Hockey League joined with the Oakland Clippers to re-form the Pacific Coast Hockey League. The Clippers relocated to Spokane in their first year. The Spokane Clippers disbanded for the 1939–40 season, but reappeared the next year as the Spokane Bombers.

The league disbanded after the 1941 season, primarily as a result of World War II.

=== Teams ===
- Oakland Clippers/Spokane Clippers (1936–1938)
- Portland Buckaroos (1936–1941)
- Seattle Seahawks (1936–1940)
- Vancouver Lions (1936–1941)
- Spokane Bombers (1940–1941)
- Seattle Olympics (1940–1941)

=== Champions ===
1937: Portland Buckaroos
1938: Seattle Seahawks
1939: Portland Buckaroos
1940: Vancouver Lions
1941: Vancouver Lions

== PCHL 1944–1952 ==
The final incarnation of the league was managed by Hockey Hall of Fame member Al Leader, and grew out of combining teams from the Southern California Hockey League and the Northwest International Hockey League. The PCHL was founded as an amateur loop, partly because the National Hockey League recognized Pacific Coast Hockey Association (PCHA) founder Lester Patrick as the territorial rights holder for professional hockey in Vancouver, Portland, and Seattle. In 1948, however, the ten team league voted to turn pro, and was recognized as such by the NHL.

Before the start of the 1951–1952 season, the PCHL had dwindled to a six team league. The neighbouring Western Canada Senior Hockey League (WCSHL), which played minor senior hockey on the Canadian prairies, had also dwindled, to just three franchises. The three WCSHL franchises turned professional and joined the PCHL for 1951–1952. One year later, the PCHL renamed itself the Western Hockey League before the start of the 1952–1953 season.

The PCHL championship trophy was the President's Cup.

=== Teams (1944–1952) ===
- Calgary Stampeders (1951–1952)
- Edmonton Flyers (1951–1952)
- Fresno Falcons (1946–1950)
- Hollywood Wolves (1944–1947)
- Los Angeles Monarchs (1944–1950)
- New Westminster Royals (1945–1952)
- Oakland Oaks (1944–1949)
- Pasadena Panthers (1944–1945)
- Portland Eagles (1944–1949, 1950–1951)
- Portland Penguins (1949–1950)
- San Diego Skyhawks (1944–1950)
- San Francisco Shamrocks (1944–1950)
- Saskatoon Quakers (1951–1952)
- Seattle Ironmen (1944–1952)
- Seattle Stars (1944–1945)
- Tacoma Rockets (1946–1952)
- Vancouver Canucks (1945–1952), in Vancouver, British Columbia
- Vancouver Vanguards (1944–1945), in Vancouver, Washington
- Victoria Cougars (1949–1952)

=== Champions (1944–1952) ===
1945: Seattle Ironmen
1946: Vancouver Canucks
1947: Los Angeles Monarchs
1948: Vancouver Canucks
1949: San Diego Skyhawks
1950: New Westminster Royals
1951: Victoria Cougars
1952: Saskatoon Quakers

== See also ==
- Pacific Coast Hockey Association
- Western Hockey League (1952–1974)
