= Washington Lions =

Washington Lions may refer to either of the two professional ice hockey teams of the same name:

- Washington Lions (AHL)
- Washington Lions (EHL)
