= Gerald Ratner =

British businessman (born 1949)

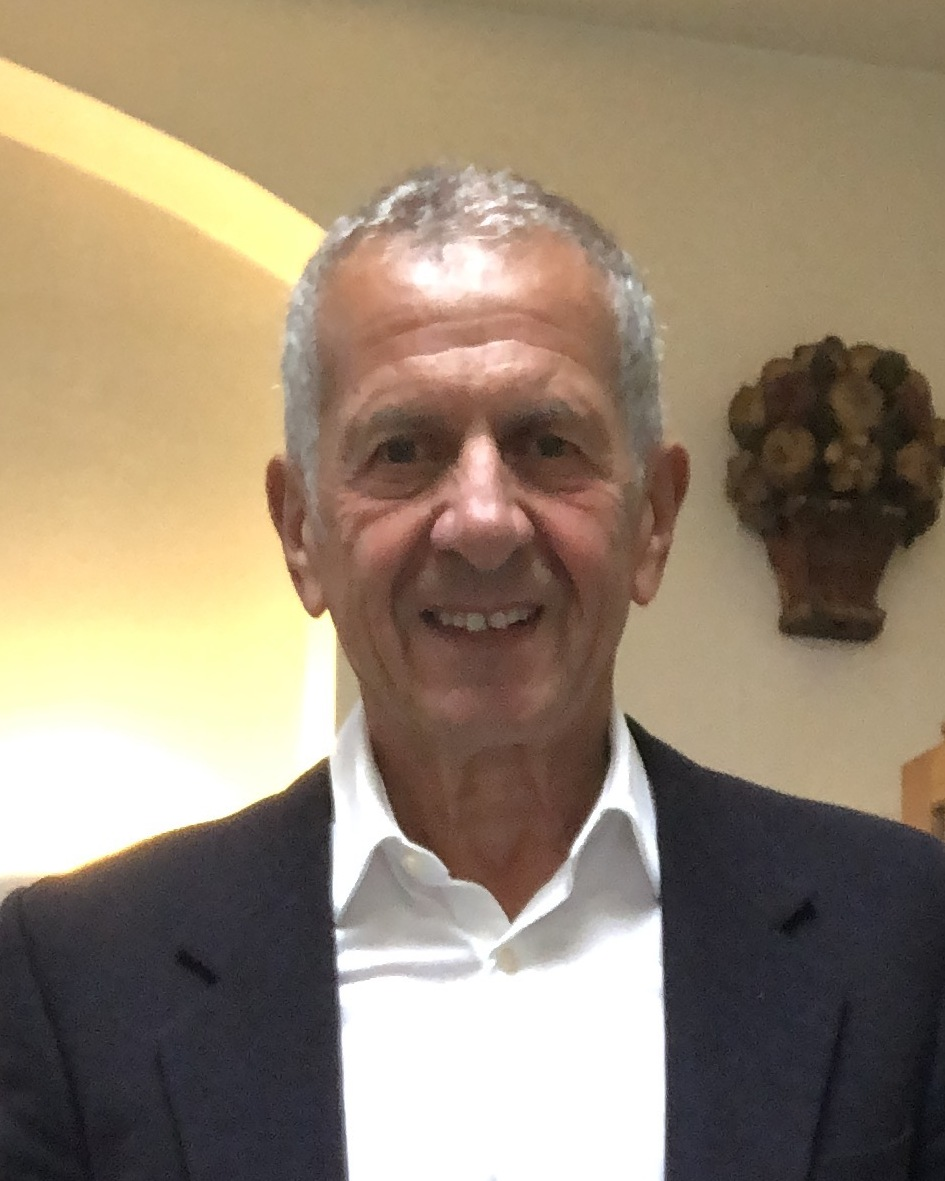
- Ratner in 2020
- Born: Gerald Irving Ratner; 1 November 1949 (age 76); London, England
- Education: Hendon County Grammar School
- Occupations: Businessman and motivational speaker
- Spouses: Angela Trup; Moira Ratner
- Children: 4
- Relatives: Anthony Parnes (brother-in-law)

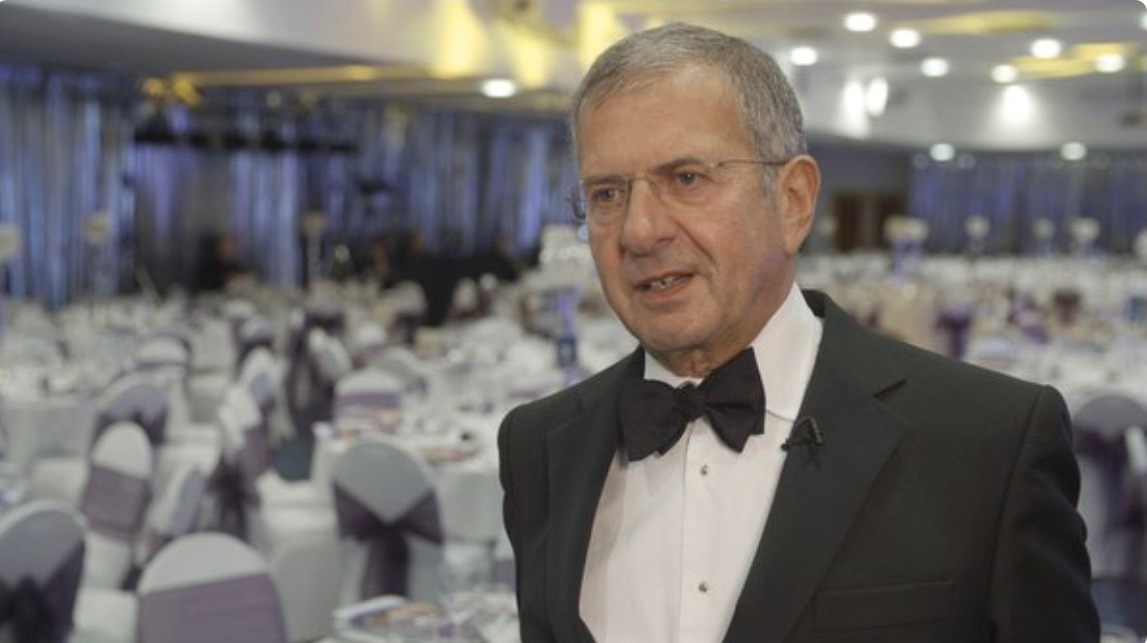
Ratner at The Telegraph Business Awards in 2015

Gerald Irving Ratner (born 1 November 1949) is a British businessman. He was formerly chief executive of the British jewellery company Ratner Group, now called the Signet Group. Ratner achieved notoriety after making a speech in 1991 where he jokingly denigrated his company's products as "total crap", leading to the company's near-collapse and his exit from the business in 1993. The notorious speech led to the creation of the phrase "doing a Ratner", meaning to make ruinous comments about your company or products.

== Early life ==
Gerald Ratner was born in London to a Jewish family and based his philosophy of business on his experiences as a boy in Petticoat Lane Market. He observed that "the people who shouted the loudest and appeared to give the best offers sold the most." He was educated at the Hendon County Grammar School.

His sister Denise Ratner was married to stockbroker Anthony Parnes, one of the Guinness Four.

== Career ==
Ratner joined the family business in 1966 and built up an extremely successful chain of jewellers during the 1980s, of which he was CEO. The shops shocked the formerly staid jewellery industry by displaying fluorescent orange posters advertising cut-price bargains and by offering low price ranges. The Ratners Group consisted of Ratners, H. Samuel, Ernest Jones, Leslie Davis, Watches of Switzerland, and over 1,000 shops in the United States, including Kay Jewelers.

Although widely regarded as "tacky", the shops and their wares were nevertheless extremely popular with the public, until Ratner made a speech addressing a conference of the Institute of Directors at the Royal Albert Hall on 23 April 1991. During the speech, he commented:

We also do cut-glass sherry decanters complete with six glasses on a silver-plated tray that your butler can serve you drinks on, all for £4.95. People say, "How can you sell this for such a low price?", I say, "because it's total crap."

He compounded this by going on to remark that one of the sets of earrings was "cheaper than a prawn sandwich from Marks and Spencer's, but I have to say the sandwich will probably last longer than the earrings". Ratner made a guest appearance on TV chat show Wogan the day after his speech, where he apologised and explained his joking remark that some of his company's products were "total crap". Ratner's comments have become textbook examples of why CEOs should choose their words carefully. In the furore that ensued, customers stayed away from Ratner shops.

After the speech, the value of the Ratner Group plummeted by around £500 million, which very nearly resulted in the group's collapse. Ratner hired a chairman in an attempt to stabilise the situation, and was dismissed by the new company chairman in November 1992. The group changed its name to Signet Group in September 1993.

Ratner's speech is infamous as an example of the value of branding and image over quality. Such gaffes are now sometimes called "doing a Ratner", and Ratner himself has acquired the sobriquet "The Sultan of Bling". Ratner has said that his remarks were not meant to be taken seriously. He blamed what he called aggressiveness and deliberate misinterpretation by several media outlets for the severe consumer reaction.

Following an unsuccessful attempt to become a jewellery consultant in France during the mid-1990s, he set up a health club in Henley-on-Thames in 1996, which was sold for £3.9m in 2001. Ratner then ran, from 2003, in collaboration with SB&T International Ltd, an export manufacturing company based in India and the online jewellery business Gerald Online, which ceased trading in 2014.

In 2013, during a visit to India for the inaugural eTailing India Expo, Ratner announced that he would be entering the Indian market.

In December 2025, it was reported that Ratner was trying to acquire H Samuel and Ernest Jones in the UK, brands he once owned through Ratner Group, from Signet Jewellers.

== Personal life ==
Ratner has two daughters from his first marriage. According to Ratner, "my first wife left me because I was never at home."

He later married Moira, and they lived in Cookham, Berkshire. They have a daughter and a son.
