= Blue Nile (disambiguation) =

Blue Nile is a river in Ethiopia and Sudan.

Blue Nile may also refer to:

- Blue Nile (state), a state in Sudan that is part of the Blue Nile region
- Blue Nile (company), an online jewelry retailer
- The Blue Nile (band), a Scottish band
- The Blue Nile, a 1962 historical book by Alan Moorehead

== See also ==
- Nile Blue, a histological staining dye
