= Gerald Online =

Indian jewelry company

- Industry: Retail
- Founded: 2003
- Defunct: 2014
- Headquarters: London, United Kingdom
- Key people: Gerald Ratner (CEO)
- Products: Jewellery
- Website: www.geraldonline.com

Gerald Online was an online jewellery retail store operated in collaboration with Gerald Ratner and a Mumbai-based jewellery exporter SB&T International Ltd.

== History ==
In 1984, founder Gerald Ratner inherited his family business, Ratners. About 10 years later, Ratners was one of the biggest jewellers in the world. However, due to several ill-advised jokes from Ratner during his 1991 speech to the Institute of Directors at the Royal Albert Hall, Ratners went into bankruptcy.

In 2003, after rebranding Ratners as Signet Jewelers, Gerald Ratner founded the online business Gerald Online in collaboration with SB&T.

Gerald Online ceased trading around 2014.

== Operation ==
Gerald Online presented itself as selling jewellery directly from its factory, claiming that this resulted in lower prices.

Gerald Ratner and SB&T entered the Indian market under the name Gerald Online India.
