= Uline Arena =

Indoor arena in Washington, D.C.

- Interactive map of Uline Arena
- Capacity: 8,000

Construction
- Opened: 1941

Tenants
- Hockey; Washington Lions (AHL and EHL) (1941–1943, 1947–1949, both AHL) (1944-1947, 1951-1957, both EHL); Georgetown Hoyas (NCAA) (1941–1942, 1946–1949); GWU Colonials men's basketball (1941-1960); Washington Presidents (EHL) (1957–1960); Basketball; Washington Capitols (BAA and NBA) (1946–1951); Georgetown Hoyas (NCAA) (1946–1947, 1949–1951); Washington Tapers (ABL) (1961–1962); Washington Caps (ABA) (1969–1970)
- Uline Ice Company Plant and Arena Complex
- U.S. National Register of Historic Places
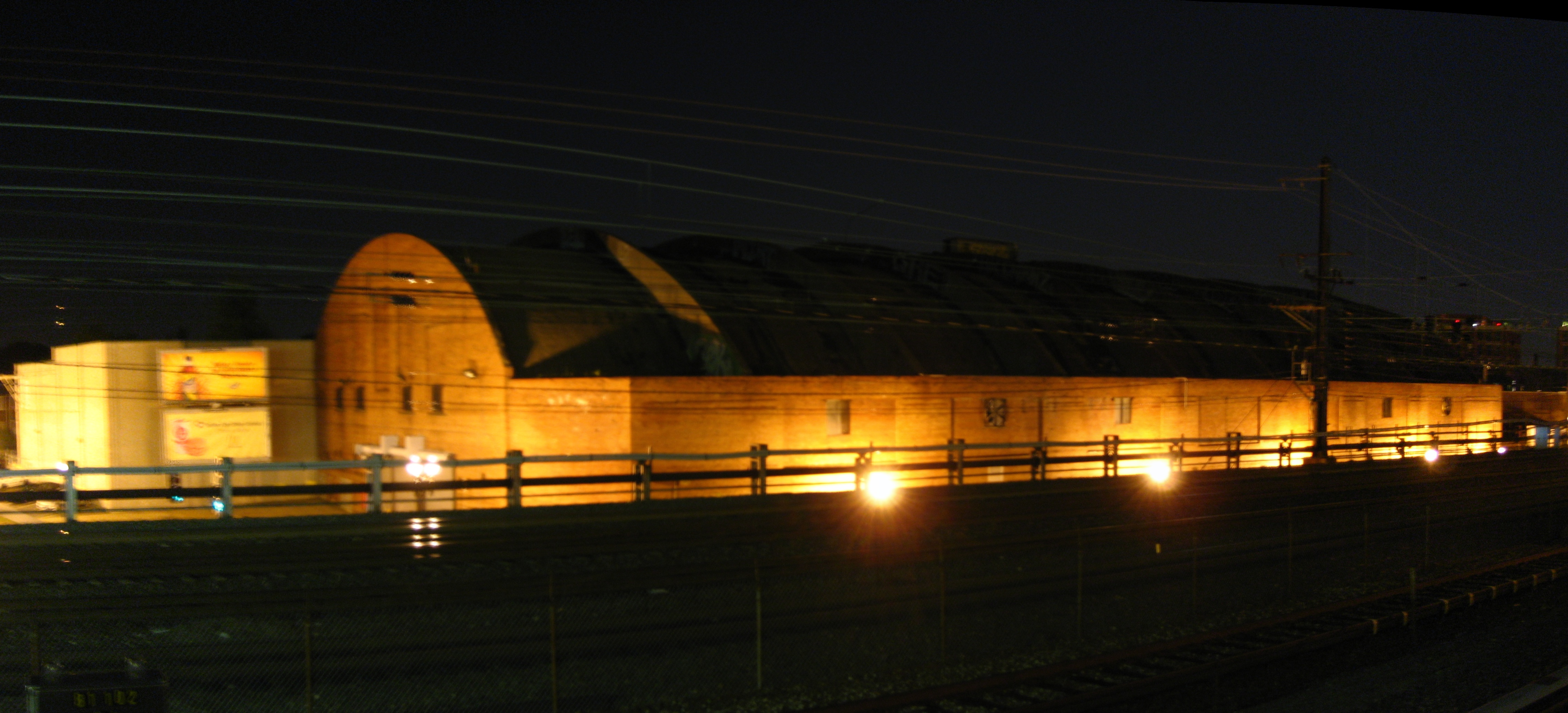
- Uline Arena in 2008

- Location within Washington, D.C.
- Location: 1132, 1140, and 1146 3rd St. NE, Washington, District of Columbia
- Coordinates: 38°54′18″N 77°0′11″W
- Area: 3.9 acres (1.6 ha)
- Built: 1941
- Architect: Kubitz & Koenig; et al.
- Architectural style: Modern Movement
- NRHP reference No.: 07000448
- Added to NRHP: May 17, 2007

The Uline Arena, later renamed the Washington Coliseum, was an indoor arena in Washington, D.C. located at 1132, 1140, and 1146 3rd Street, Northeast, Washington, D.C. It was the site of one of President Dwight D. Eisenhower's inaugural balls in 1953, the first concert by the Beatles in the United States in 1964, and several other memorable moments in sports, show business, politics and in the civil rights movement of the 1960s. It had a capacity of over 8,000 people and was a major event space in Washington until the early 1970s.

The arena was home to the Washington Capitols of the Basketball Association of America (1946–1949) and National Basketball Association (1949–1950), who were once coached by Red Auerbach. Later, the American Basketball Association's Washington Caps played there in 1969–1970.

Once abandoned and used as a parking garage, it was renovated and now houses offices and REI's D.C. flagship store.

It is directly adjacent to the railroad tracks heading into Union Station and bounded by L and M Street NE. It is located across from the Metrorail NoMa–Gallaudet U station southern entrance.

== History ==
A soldier inspecting a couple of zoot suits in the Uline Arena during Woody Herman's Orchestra engagement in 1942. Rows of seats are visible in the background.

Starting in 1938, the idea of building an arena in the area was under consideration. Michael (or Migiel or Miguel) J. Uline, president of Capitol Garden Corp., was considering it June of that year but was waiting on a decision by the local government on whether or not they were going to build an arena of their own at the intersection of 4th Street NW and Constitution Avenue NW. Michael Uline held 68 patents and was a successful businessman originally from the Netherlands. His parents decided to leave their home in the province of North Brabant due to numerous floodings in the area of the Maas river and the Uline family emigrated to the United States in 1890, when Michiel was 16 years old. His first business interests in the US revolved around the production and distribution of ice, and the site in Washington, in 1931, just south of the later Arena, was dedicated to ice manufacturing, storage, and sales.

By early 1940, the arena was under construction. It was however already being criticized. On March 14, 1940, coach Bill Reinhart of the George Washington basketball team was critical of the design: there were too many seats behind the backboards and not enough on the sidelines. On March 20, the architect, Joe Harry Lapish, responded to the criticism by stating that the arena would be able to house between 6,500 and 7,000 basketball spectators including 4,500 to 5,000 highly desirable seats on the sidelines.

On December 28, 1940, while the arena was nearing completion, Michael Uline announced that it would open on January 28, 1941, and would present a 15-performance engagement of "Ice-Capades of 1941" in 13 days which would end on February 9. More details of the interior where also shared. The heated arena would feature arm-rest seats, each with a complete and unhindered view of the ice by post supports and beams. The ice surface would be 225 feet (69 m) by 120 feet (37 m) and be the biggest in the country. It would be frozen using the Vedder system connected to the plant located next door which would provide the brine by-pass. Raoul Le Mat was General Manager. The following day, further details of the 1941 program was announced. A rodeo was planned and other activities were in the works: roller follies, a defense exposition, possibly a Cherry Blossom Festival, professional, collegiate and amateur hockey, boxing and college basketball were also considered. On January 9, 1941, the owner announced that the arena had been awarded the Indoor Speed Skating Championship by the National Amateur Ice Skating Union to take place on February 22 and 23, 1941. All the speed skating stars from the country would be present for the event including Leo Freisinger. It was also announced that Eddie Bean, a well-known local golfer, would become the new Ticket Sale Director for the Uline Arena. He had previously handled the ticket sales of the Washington Baseball Club and of the Redskins for a decade.

On January 22, it was announced that the third boxing performance between Joey Archibald and Harry Jeffra would take place on February 18, 1941. The following day, it was announced by the Evening Star that Mr. Uline had purchased an American Hockey League team to be known as the 'Washington Ulines'. It was to be in fact the Washington Lions. It would become a step up over the other Washington hockey team, the Washington Eagles in the Eastern Hockey League. Mr. Uline had considered getting a National Hockey League team but due to the maintenance cost had decided to go with the American Hockey League instead.

Finally, the Uline rink opened on January 28, 1941, with the Ice-Capades. The show took place in front of 3,000 people. The space in what was described as a "concrete cavern" was well received by the public. However, it seems that the ice was faulty that was to be remediated by the following night: the "blades cut the brittle surface like snowball scrapers and precipitated several unscheduled spills".

On February 10, 1941, Sonja Henie's Hollywood Ice Revue went on the ice in the Uline Arena.

The first Hockey game to take place in the arena was between Georgetown University Hoyas and Temple University Owls on February 15, 1941. The first boxing match was on March 6, 1941, between Billy Conn and Daniel Hassett in preparation for the match between Billy Conn and Joe Louis.

Soon after it opened, the Uline Arena offered public skating every day: weekdays and Sundays from 2 pm to 4:30 pm and 8:30 pm to 11 pm. It also offered Saturday morning sessions from 10:00am to 12:30 pm. Admission was 35 cents for adults in the afternoon and 55 cents in the evening. Children's admission was 25 cents in the afternoon and 35 cents in the evening.

On November 3, 1941, just a few weeks before the Japanese attack on Pearl Harbor brought the United States into the war on December 7, 1941, the Pageant of American Freedom took place at the Uline Arena. It was a variety show by Ben Hecht and Charles MacArthur with a 200 chorus of 90 voices and an Orchestra. All proceeds went to the D.C. Defense Council and the ad featured Mickey Mouse, Donald Duck and Goofy waving a flag, playing the drums and the flute. It appears that a version of the song It's Fun to Be Free was sung in this performance.

On January 30, 1942, President Franklin D. Roosevelt celebrated his 60th birthday. It was a nationwide celebration. In the city, a banquet, six dances and special midnight shows at three theaters took place. Dances took place at the Hamilton, Mayflower, Shoreham and Wardman Park Hotels as well as the Uline Arena and the Lincoln Colonnade from 9 pm to 1 am. First Lady Eleanor Roosevelt was present at the Arena to cut a 650-pound birthday cake. Johnny Long's Orchestra played and Lucy Monroe sang "The Star-Spangled Banner". Several Hollywood Stars were also present including Rosalind Russell, Carol Bruce, Dorothy Lamour, Dinah Shore, Gene Raymond, and Pat O'Brien.

=== Basketball and hockey ===
After World War II ended in 1945, the arena continued to be used as an ice hockey and basketball venue. The Washington Capitols began play as a charter member of the Basketball Association of America in 1946 and became a charter member of the National Basketball Association (NBA) in 1949; during its five seasons of play, the team used Uline Arena as its home court. Earl Lloyd, the first African American athlete to play for an NBA team, played for the Capitols at Uline Arena on October 31, 1950. The team folded during the 1950–1951 season.

During the 1946–1947, 1949–1950, and 1950–1951 seasons, the Georgetown University Hoyas men's basketball team played home games at Uline Arena. From 1941 to 1960, the George Washington University Colonials men's basketball team played their home games in the arena as well.

In 1969, the American Basketball Association's defending championship team, the Oakland Oaks, moved to Washington and played as the Washington Caps during the 1969–1970 season. The Oaks, owned by entertainer Pat Boone, had captured the ABA Championship in the 1968–69 season, and Boone sold the team to Earl Foreman due to poor attendance in Oakland. Foreman relocated the franchise to Washington. Hall of Famers Rick Barry and Larry Brown played for the Caps, with Brown leading the league in assists and Barry averaging 27 points per game. The team finished 44–40 and was eliminated by the Denver Rockets in the playoffs. Plagued by poor attendance, the franchise relocated again and became the Virginia Squires following their one season in the Washington.

The Washington Lions of the American Hockey League and Eastern Hockey League (1941–1942 and 1944–1949) and the Washington Presidents of the Eastern Hockey League (1957–1960) played at Washington Coliseum.

The arena remained segregated after its opening until January 1948.

=== Inauguration ball, new owner and civil rights ===
On December 10, 1952, Miguel J. Uline, who was 78 years old, divorced his first wife whom he had married in 1895. This divorce procedure was complicated because Uline had received an invalid Mexican divorce in 1950 and married a former beauty shop operator, Mrs Elva Houseman, the same day. Mr. Uline and his first wife, Mrs. Carolyn Eierman Uline, had not lived together since 1930. It appears that she had reached out to her husband once a year around Christmas in an effort to get back together but that in recent years, she had simply stopped as he "was living with another woman". They had two children together.

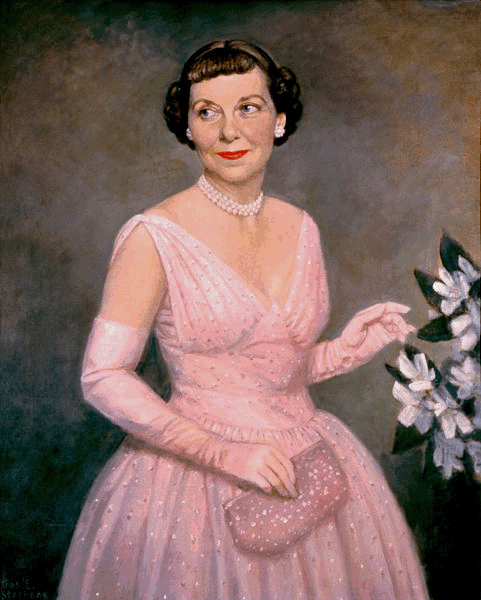
Mamie Eisenhower in her inauguration ball gown designed by Nettie Rosenstein; painted in 1953 by Thomas Stevens

On January 20, 1953, one of President Dwight D. Eisenhower′s two inaugural balls was held at Uline Arena. Mamie Eisenhower wore a pink peau de soie gown embroidered with more than 2,000 rhinestones designed by Nettie Rosenstein. She also wore gloves matching the gown and rhinestone-and-perl earrings, necklace and bracelet by Trifaro. Her purse was beaded by Judith Leiber (an employee of Nettie Rosenstein at the time). Her shoes were made by Delman with her name printed on the left instep. The gown, shoes and purse were later gifted to the National Museum of American History by Mrs. Eisenhower.

On March 16, 1956, retired boxer Joe Louis made his debut as a professional wrestler at Uline Arena, defeating Cowboy Rocky Lee. Earlier that year on January 27, 1956, he had been the referee in the Uline Arena of a wrestling match between "Nature Boy" Rogers and Cowboy Rocky Lee.

On February 22, 1958, Michael Uline died at the age of 83. On March 28, 1958, his will was admitted to probate in the District Court. The validity of the will was under attack by his second wife, Mrs. Elva Houseman Uline. Requesting the court's sanction of the disputed documents were Uline's daughter Myrtle U. Pratt and Elizaberth R. Stine, executive Vice President of the M.J. Uline Company Inc. The will was one of three on file with the court. This will was drawn on October 15, 1957, and amended two months later. A 1955 will assigned the widow a trusteeship in the company. This provision was not in the latest will.

On May 31, 1959, Elijah Muhammad, the leader of the Nation of Islam, gave a speech in the arena to close to 10,000 members who had flown in from 70 cities and 23 states. He had arrived secretly in Washington and disproved that he was on the run from the FBI. He was escorted from the airport to the Roosevelt Hotel with a ten-motorcycle motorcade from the Metropolitan Police. He was later escorted by the same police force to the arena. A full weapon search was conducted. He called for "the American Negro [...] to defend himself from grievous and unprovoked attacks by the white man". He also spoke against integration and for justice. After returning to the hotel under police escort, he sat down for a filmed interview with WNTA of New York. The interview was not broadcast immediately but according to a spokesman, "the pending destruction of the white man will occur before 1970."

Harry G. Lynn, former vice-president of Fairfax Distributing Co., national buyer of the Kay Jewelry chain was a native of Kansas City. He bought the arena on December 17, 1959, for $1 million. He had no experience in the ice business or in sports promotion but loved Washington, D.C. and wanted to stay there. He had struggled in making the arena financially viable. The basketball Caps cost him $250,000 in 1952 and he had lost $100,000 on ice hockey. Elizabeth R. Stine was his original secretary and remained on board as vice president. Uline's daughters and widows had managed the arena after his death but this was seen as the settlement of his estate after the will's authenticity was contested the previous year. The ice plant was considered the largest in the country at the time. Lynn had made the decision to dedicate himself fully to the arena and to learn all he could about the industry. One major obstacle was the question of parking. While there were streetcars, the systems were slowly being dismantled in the late 1950s and early 1960s and there would not be a metro stop there until 2004.

In 1960, Lynn renamed the building the Washington Coliseum.

On June 4, 1961, 8,000 members of the Nation of Islam gathered again in the arena. Elijah Muhammad failed to appear at this event. Malcolm X, then one of his lieutenants, spoke instead. He said that the black community had been "brainwashed". Seven years after the US Supreme Court had made segregation in schools illegal with the landmark decision Brown v. Board of Education of Topeka in 1954, less than 6% were compliant. He called for "separation, not integration or segregation." There were also two female speakers who took the stage: Sister Christine, head of the University of Islam in Chicago and Sister Sherriff, Elijah Muhammad's daughter. Also present were George Lincoln Rockwell and 20 members of the American Nazi Party.

=== The Beatles concert ===
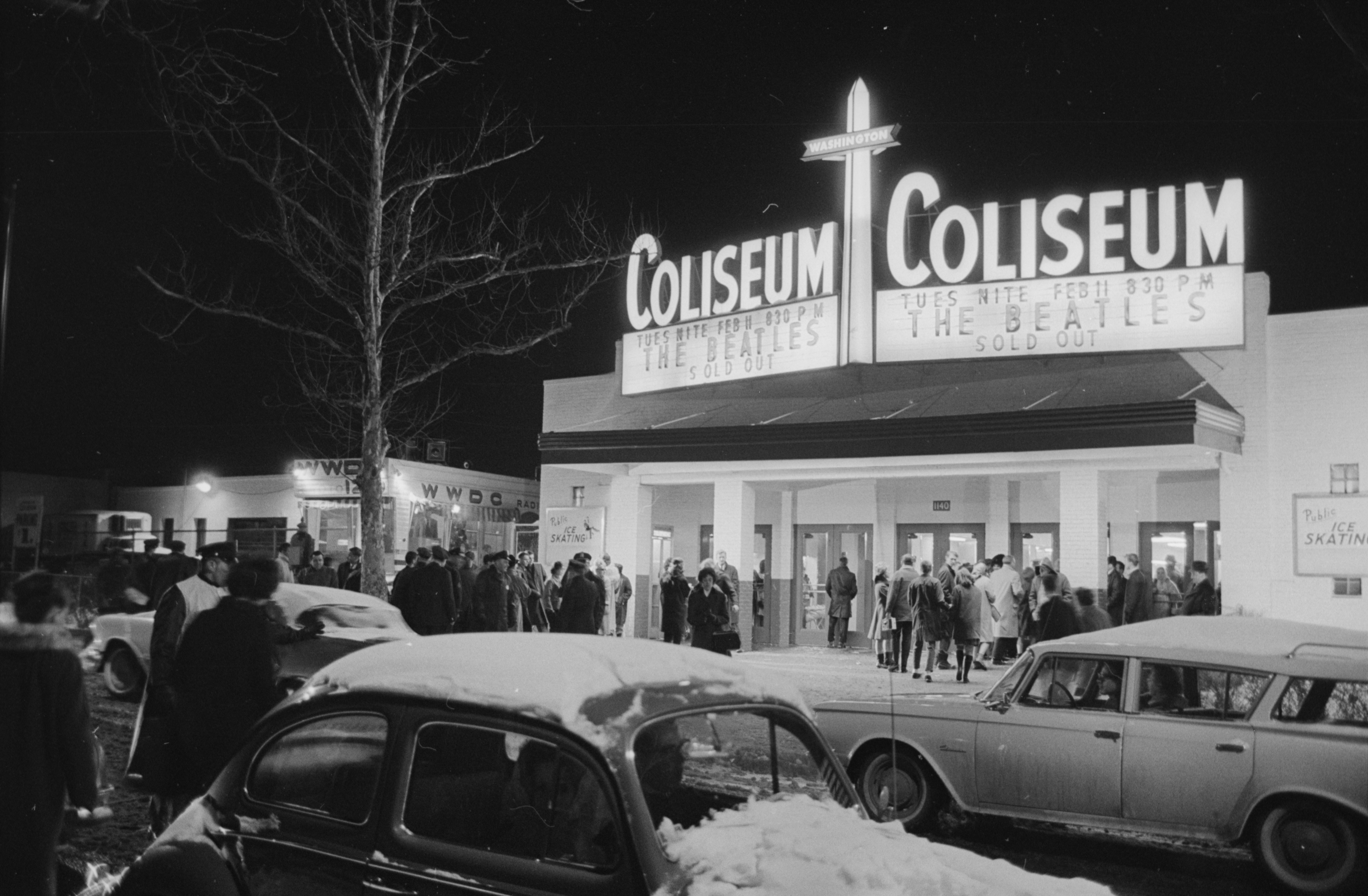
Entrance of the Coliseum on February 11, 1964

On February 11, 1964, the Beatles played their first concert in the United States at the Washington Coliseum, less than 48 hours after the band's appearance on The Ed Sullivan Show. According to John B. Lynn, Harry Lynn got a call asking him if he was interested in having the Beatles at the Coliseum. He had never heard of them but said yes. Though Harry usually did not meet his acts, he did meet the Beatles. He had been stationed in Liverpool and may have felt a connection there. He was not expecting such a crowd, especially with the snow. He had run only one ad in the Washington Post and the concert had sold out in days.

A major snowstorm had fallen on the east coast of the United States. All flights had been canceled so the Beatles arrived in Washington, D.C. through Union Station via the Congressman, the Pennsylvania Railroad express train. There were eight inches of snow on the ground all over the city but attendance was still strong.

Tickets to the show at the Coliseum ranged from $2 to $4. There were 8,092 fans at the concert, which was to be opened by The Chiffons, and Tommy Roe. However, because of the snow, The Chiffons were unable to make it and were replaced by Jay and the Americans. In 2014, Roe reflected on the event:

The marquee didn't say anything about the other acts. It just said "The Beatles." It was all about them. But I wasn't offended. That's just the way it worked. I was there to do my two songs and then get off the stage.

The Beatles took the stage at 8:31 p.m. and opened with "Roll Over Beethoven." The artists were in the middle of the Coliseum on a boxing ring platform. It was the first time (and possibly the only time) that the band played "in the round". The goal was to fit as many people in the Coliseum, and this configuration allowed 8,000 spectators versus 6,000 to 6,500 if the stage were at one end. The group played a 12-song set and played for approximately 40 minutes.

A screenshot from the February 11, 1964 Beatles concert at the arena. It was the band's first concert in the United States.

The commentary by Leroy Aarons, The Washington Post national correspondent reviewing the concert, surprised many people in the DC area who had not realized how large a following the band had garnered during its first visit to the United States.

An 8000-voice choir performed last night at Washington Coliseum in the premiere of what is likely to become an American classic. Call it in B for want of a better name. The choir was accompanied, incidentally, by four young British artists who call themselves the Beatles. Their part was almost completely obscured by the larger choral group, but one imagines they'll be heard from again. [...] One was impressed by the versatility of the choral group, most of whom seemed to be teen-age girls. Their range invites comparison with Yma Sumac, their intensity of emotion with the victim in a Hitchcock film. Caruso would envy their volume. The greatest belly dancer could hardly match their physical agility.... While their voices are a bit thin, [The Beatles] possess the quality of semi-hysteria so necessary for this kind of performance. Also, they sweat and smile a lot.

In 2004, he reviewed his comment:

We were a couple of old fogies over 30. I was completely wrong.

The concert was videotaped by CBS. It was then transferred to kinescope. On March 14 and 15, 1964, it was shown in 100 movie theaters and in the Uline Arena. The video of the concert not only contains the Beatles show but was also fleshed out with content from other separate performances from The Beach Boys and Lesley Gore. Three of the songs played at the venue are featured in The Beatles: The First U.S. Visit DVD: I Wanna Be Your Man, She Loves You and I Saw Her Standing There. The Anthology 3 contains She Loves You and I Saw Her Standing There as well as Please Please Me. A bootleg copy of the full concert appears to have been available in fall 2003 but it was immediately removed from the market after Apple Records lawyers objected.

The concert film is now available in its entirety exclusively from the iTunes Store as part of The Beatles Box Set on the Past Masters, Vols. 1&2 disc.

The Rolling Stones played their third U.S. concert at the arena on November 13, 1965 in the same center located boxing rink as The Beatles. This concert predates Bob Dylan at the venue by several weeks.

=== Bob Dylan's Greatest Hits cover ===
The cover photo for Bob Dylan's Greatest Hits, taken by Rowland Scherman at the Uline Arena. The photo won a Grammy Award in 1967.

Bob Dylan performed at the Washington Coliseum, and the photograph of Dylan on the cover of Bob Dylan's Greatest Hits was taken at a concert at the Coliseum on November 28, 1965. The artist's website does not have a set list for that date.

Life magazine photographer Rowland Scherman and his wife Joan lived nearby and attended the concert. Although he was not on duty at the time, he brought his camera and used his press pass to gain access to the backstage area to take a few photos. In Encounters With Bob Dylan, Scherman remembers the moment:

Dylan was in that dirty blue spot, doing some song I can no longer remember. I put the 300 mill on him, and I could see the whole thing. His hair, his halo, his harp — the three H's. So, I went bang, bang, bang, bang — six or seven frames. No motor or anything. Then, I said, "Thank you very much, I’ll be leaving now." I didn’t hang around. I just kept thinking, "It doesn’t get any better than this", and went back to watch the rest of the concert.

Scherman got in touch with Columbia Records art director John Berg, who was dating Scherman's sister at the time. Berg bought the shot for $300 and, along with Bob Cato, used the photo for the album cover. It won the 10th Annual Grammy Award for Best Album Cover, Photography, in 1967. The photographer's name was misspelled on the award statuette and remains misspelled on the Grammy Awards website.

=== The Temptations riots ===
On Sunday October 29, 1967, The Temptations were scheduled to play. A group of fans attempted to get in the Coliseum at 6:30 pm, an hour and a half before the scheduled start of the show. Some of these youth backed a security guard named Robert E. Atkins, 23, of the Suburban Protective Agency in a corner. Fearing for his life, he drew his pistol and fired two shots in the air. The group dispersed. The Agency was supposed to send 50 officers but only sent 18. The shortage of security staff made it difficult for the crowd to be controlled during the show. The Temptations took the stage around 10:30 pm in front of a crowd of 7,000 and dozens of fans rushed on the stage to take pictures with pushing and shoving.

Suddenly a loud noise was heard. It remains unclear what it was but it startled the fans who rushed for the exits in a stampede. 14 Metropolitan police officers were stationed outside the Coliseum and attempted to separate the fans in small groups. A small group of 200 youths became disorderly and were throwing rocks and bottles at the police officers. Reinforcement was called in and a riot erupted. Groups of fans were seen running in the neighborhood streets. Thirty-three windows were broken in nine stores along with four car windows and one of the Coliseum's. There was also minor looting. Two adults and four juveniles were arrested on disorderly conduct charges. A young man was stabbed in the melee though his wounds were not critical. Two women were treated at DC General Hospital after being trampled and two police officers also suffered minor wounds.

=== Detention center ===
From May 3 to 5, 1971, the building was used as a makeshift detention and processing center. On Monday, May 3, between 1,000 and 1,200 people, arrested during the 1971 May Day Protests against the Vietnam War, were guarded by 150 police officers and other guards. They sat in the seats under the red, white and blue pennants hanging from the ceiling and the large Pepsi Cola clock and scoreboard. They slept on the floor or on jackets. The National Guard and police gave them food (bologna or tuna sandwiches) but not anything warm. The temperature dropped to 50 °F (28 °C) and the prisoners were not given blankets. They were processed with arrest forms, fingerprinting and mug shots. Many of the prisoners were arrested without record of where and when they had committed offenses, and Harold H. Greene, the Chief Judge of the DC Superior Court, ordered the city to show cause in court or release them.

On May 4, there were still 600 prisoners in the Coliseum. They joined arms and chanted "One, two, three, four, we don't want your war!" with POW written on their foreheads. They also stood in the same pose to sing the Star Spangled Banner, stopping at the line "for the land of the free" to laugh and cheer. They also sang "We all live in a concentration camp" to the tune of the Beatles song "Yellow Submarine". An additional 500 prisoners were brought in and were cheered. Later that day, 20 young men and women took off their clothes and started dancing nude on the floor, as hundreds watched in a circle. When the guards started looking, the prisoners yelled: "Let the troops see!". The dance stopped after Rev. Joe Gibson grabbed a microphone and warned the crowd: "You're defeating your case." The protesters got dressed.

The detention center was visited by DC Delegate Walter Fauntroy and several congressmen including William F. Ryan (D-NY) and Robert Drinan (D-Massachusetts). Fauntroy came with a delegation from the Washington black community, who arrived in 12 cars.

Finally, the ruling from Judge Greene stated that prisoners could leave the arena only if they were photographed and fingerprinted but that these records could not be sent to the FBI or be part of the police record. This judgement was stayed until the next morning. Some prisoners did leave and the last 600 prisoners arrested on May 3 left the Coliseum three days later on Wednesday May 5 at 3 pm.

=== Tear gas, riots and fire safety concerns ===
On October 15, 1973, a rock concert took place featuring Rare Earth, Funkadelic and Ohio Players. The 5,331 permanent seats were filled and additional open space was sold to allow customers to stand or sit. In total 5,700 patrons were in the building. According to witnesses, a youth ran inside from the emergency door and threw a gas canister onto the main floor. As patrons tried to evacuate, it appeared that some of the emergency exit doors were locked, and several glass windows had to be broken to escape the fumes. This was denied by the operators of the Coliseum. They did admit that "the five sets of doors were locked at one time" earlier in the evening but said that they had been reopened once the police had cleared the lobby of would-be gate crashers.

Since the Coliseum was built prior to March 8, 1946, it was not required to have panic bars installed per the city's Egress Law. A "retroactive clause" was originally in the law but was removed in 1948 due to the high cost to retrofit such equipment. The law was passed by Congress following the Coconut Grove night club fire that killed 491 people on November 28, 1942. For the Washington Coliseum, because the Fire Inspector had not witnessed the locked doors during the concert, no court action could be taken by the Fire Department, but a warning would be issued.

The Metropolitan Police exploded tear gas outside and sprayed chemical Mace on the crowd outside. The police were onsite before the incident, as the manager had notified the Special Operations Division of the Metropolitan Police because police officers were used for traffic and crowd control outside the building. The operators said the doors were broken from the outside by bricks picked up from houses across the street. By the end of the evening, 40 people including 11 police officers had been injured and 56 people were arrested. Three police scooters and a police motorcycle were set on fire by the crowd outside.

=== Decline ===
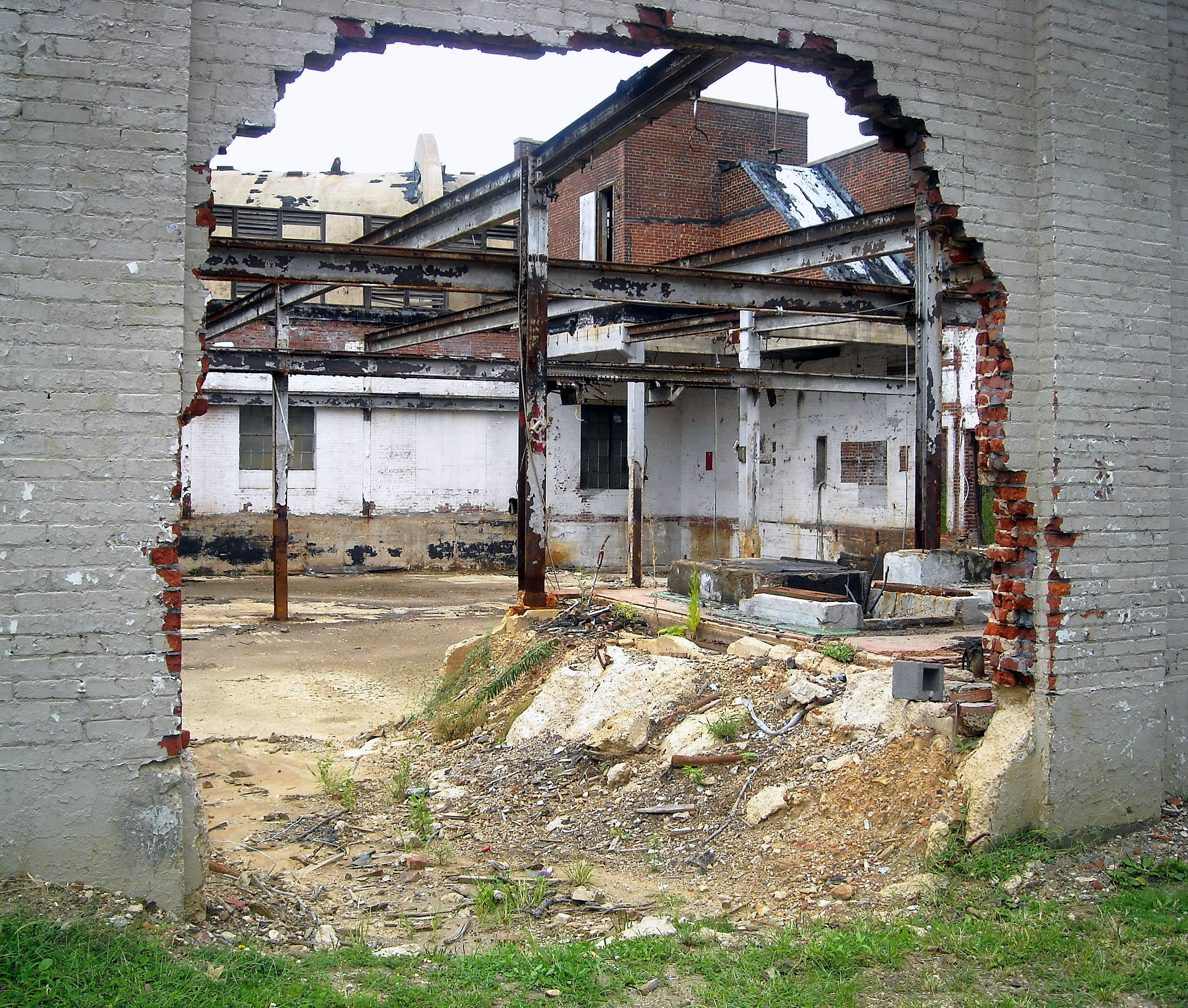
Inside the former Uline Ice Company Plant

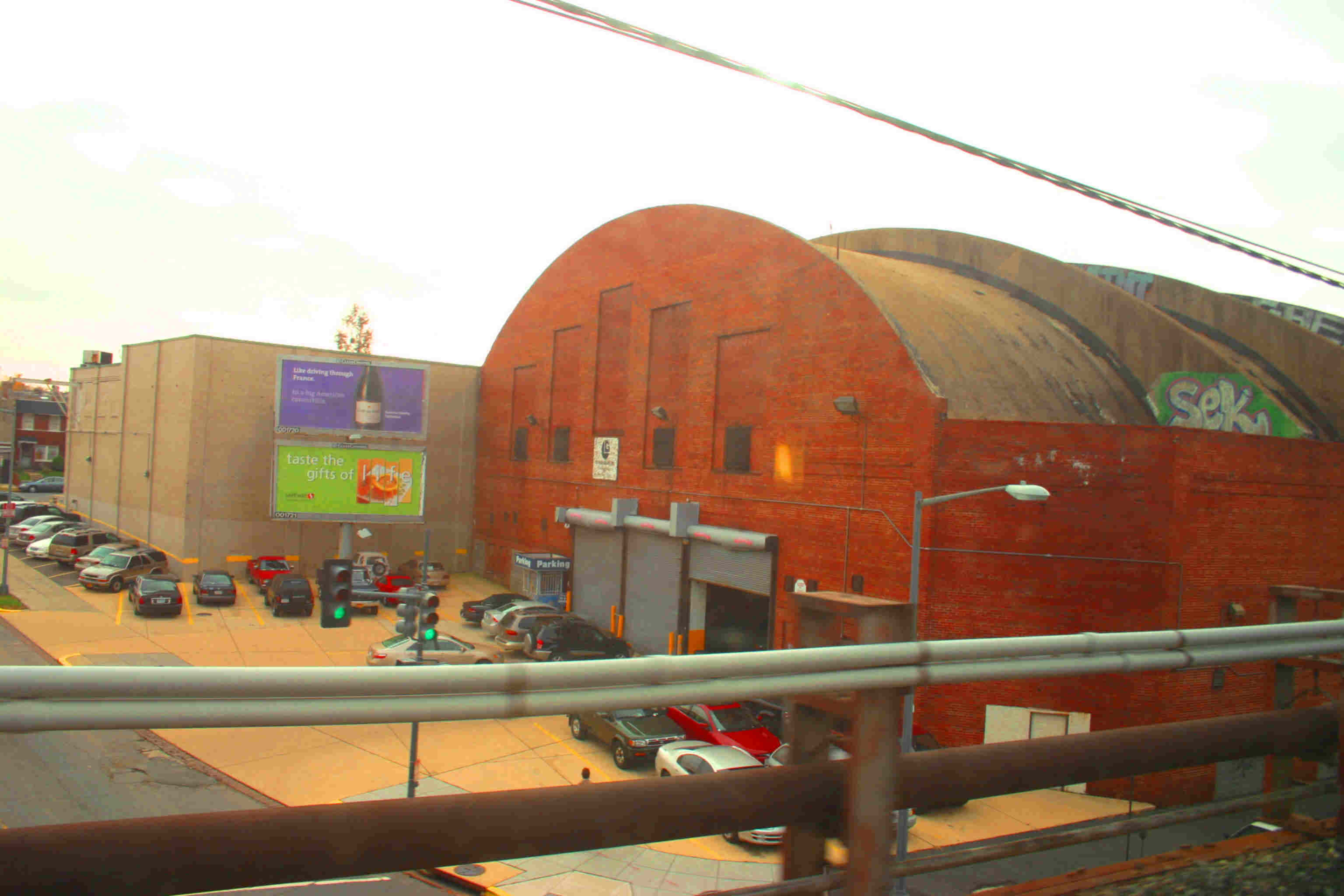
View of the arena in 2006 from the train tracks when it was used as a parking lot

The building fell into obscurity after the opening of the Capital Centre in suburban Landover, Maryland, in 1973. In 1970, Harry Lynn had proactively sold the Coliseum knowing he could not compete with the bigger and better venue being built by his friend Abe Pollin. Ice Capades, circus, and wrestling events moved out. The Near Northeast and H Street neighborhood had suffered dramatically from the 1968 riots following Martin Luther King Jr.'s assassination. The arena could only rely on soul concerts, roller derbies and later rock concerts that could cause problems. Subsequently, the arena was closed in 1985, and the building fell into disrepair with shattered windows and peeling paint.

It was leased by the Takoma Park Christian Faith Center with an option to purchase the property. A $17.5 million renovation project was planned to convert the space into a center for Christian services, crusades and education. It was a welcomed project after neighbors suffered through go-go concerts in 1983 and 1984 that led to clashes between youths and the police, transforming the residential area into a war zone on concert nights. The building was taken over on January 1, 1987, and a $6.5 million renovation began, including creation of an indoor prayer garden, a Christian bookstore and an administration building. The congregation of 700 met for worship in a small room. The leader of the congregation, Alvin Jones, was a broadcast consultant turned pastor. He and his wife also had a radio and TV show called "Successful Living", which was broadcast in Washington and Dallas. Funds came from congregation donations and from the broadcast. The lease was good until 1991 to exercise the purchase option. This grand project never really materialized.

In 1994, Waste Management purchased the building and used it as a trash transfer station. Blake Van Leer II, hired to build and design the facility, created a design to preserve its history. Van Leer is the grandson of well known engineer Blake R. Van Leer. The trash transfer station operated until 2003.

Waste Management applied for a demolition permit on May 9, 2003, and the D.C. Preservation League responded June 11 by listing the building in its "Most Endangered Places for 2003". Waste Management sold the building to Douglas Development in 2004.

In order to protect the building from efforts to raze it, it was added to the official protection list of the D.C. Historic Preservation Review Board in November 2006. It was listed on the National Register of Historic Places on May 17, 2007.

Formerly a popular spot for graffiti, the arena also was used as an indoor parking lot, with the adjacent ice house sitting vacant. Billboards also were mounted on the building. In 2009, the Coliseum was owned by Douglas Jemal under the name Jemal's Uline LLC.

== Today ==
The arena still stands today. The external shell survived the transformation of the neighborhood. After several decades of a slow death, the building experienced a rebirth in the now hip NoMa neighborhood, within walking distance from the NoMa–Gallaudet U station, which opened in 2004. New apartment buildings were constructed across the tracks. The old Washington Coliseum became known as the Uline building.

On February 11, 2014, a Beatles tribute band played in the Coliseum on the 50th anniversary of the historic Beatles concert. The timing was the same with the artists going on stage at exactly 8:31 p.m. as in 1964, and the song lineup was the same, but the Coliseum was only a shadow of what it once was. The place could only house half of what it could in 1964, and tickets were $100 a seat.

In 2015, outdoor retailer REI announced that it would develop the property into its fifth flagship store and first store in Washington, D.C. In addition to the 51,000-square-foot (4,700 m^{2}) REI store, plans called for the fully redeveloped site to house 146,200 square feet (13,580 m^{2}) of office space and an additional 17,000 square feet (1,600 m^{2}) of retail space for other users. The REI store opened on October 21, 2016, with a marching band and other festivities, as the largest REI store on the United States East Coast. In April 2017, Spaces, a brand based in Luxembourg, became the second tenant, taking over 34,000 square feet (3,200 m^{2}) of office space. Spaces Co-working is a subsidiary of Regus, which is owned by International Workplace Group.

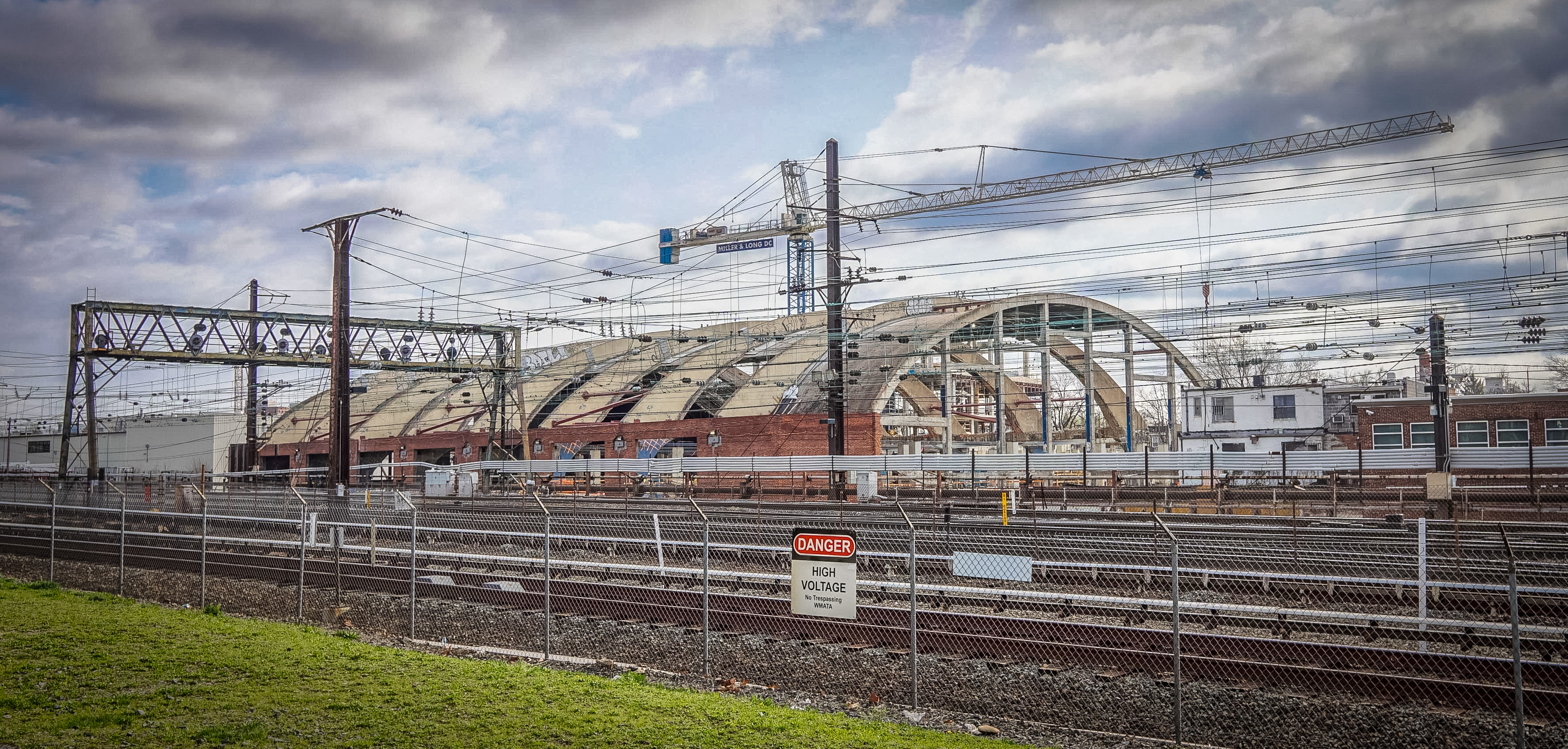
Outside view in 2016 during the demolition

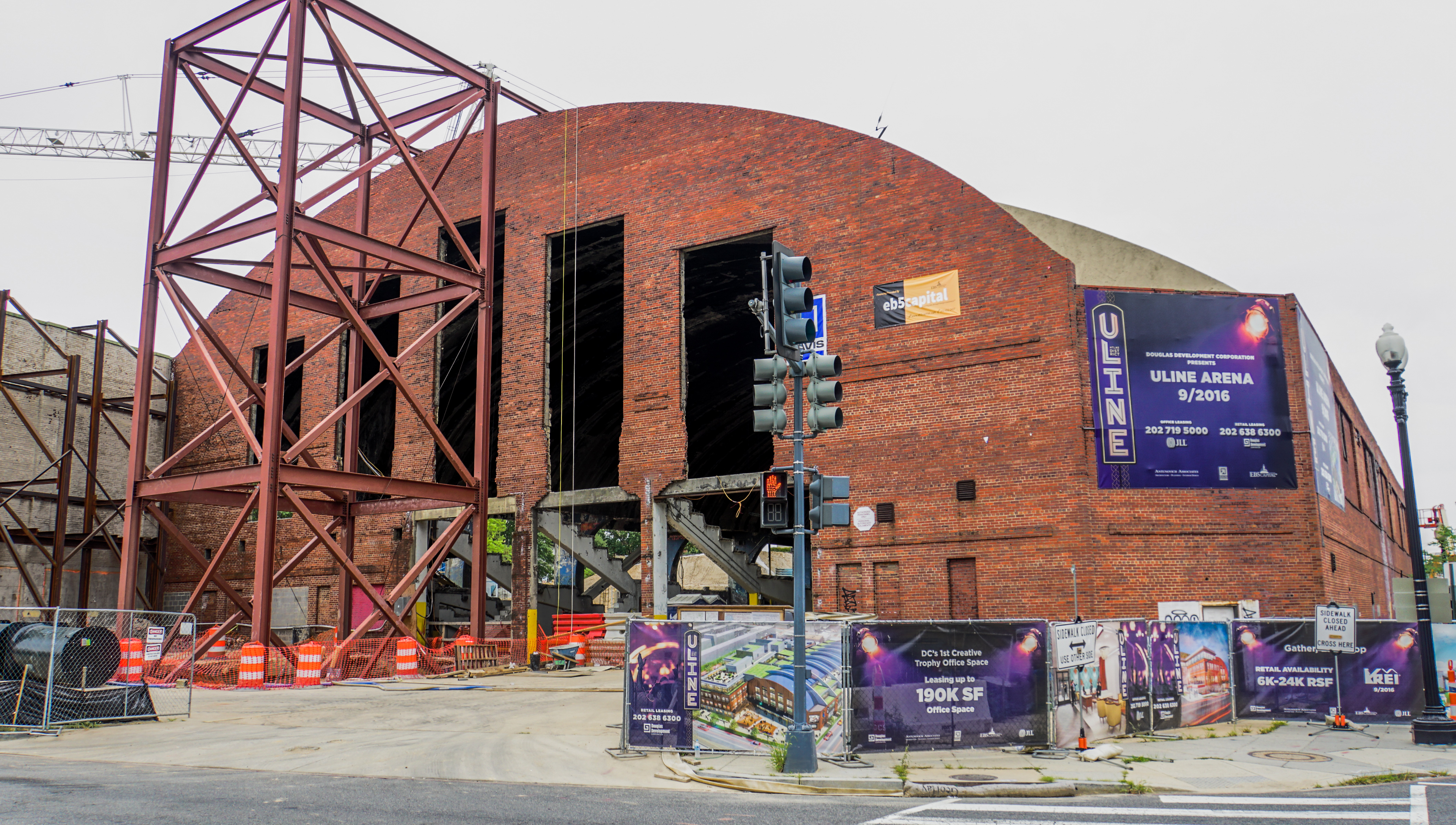
The arena being restored in 2015

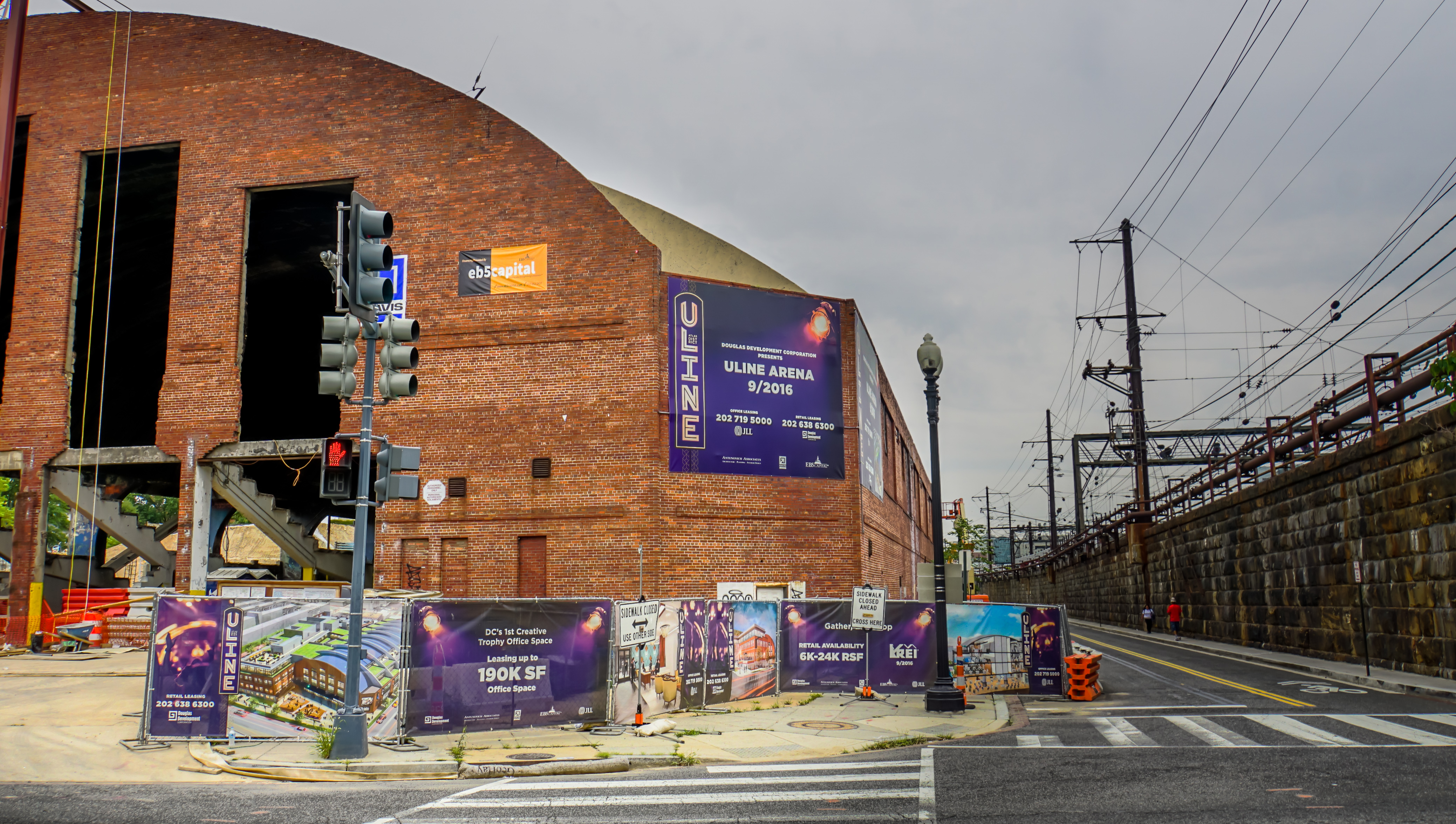
View down Delaware Avenue NE in 2015

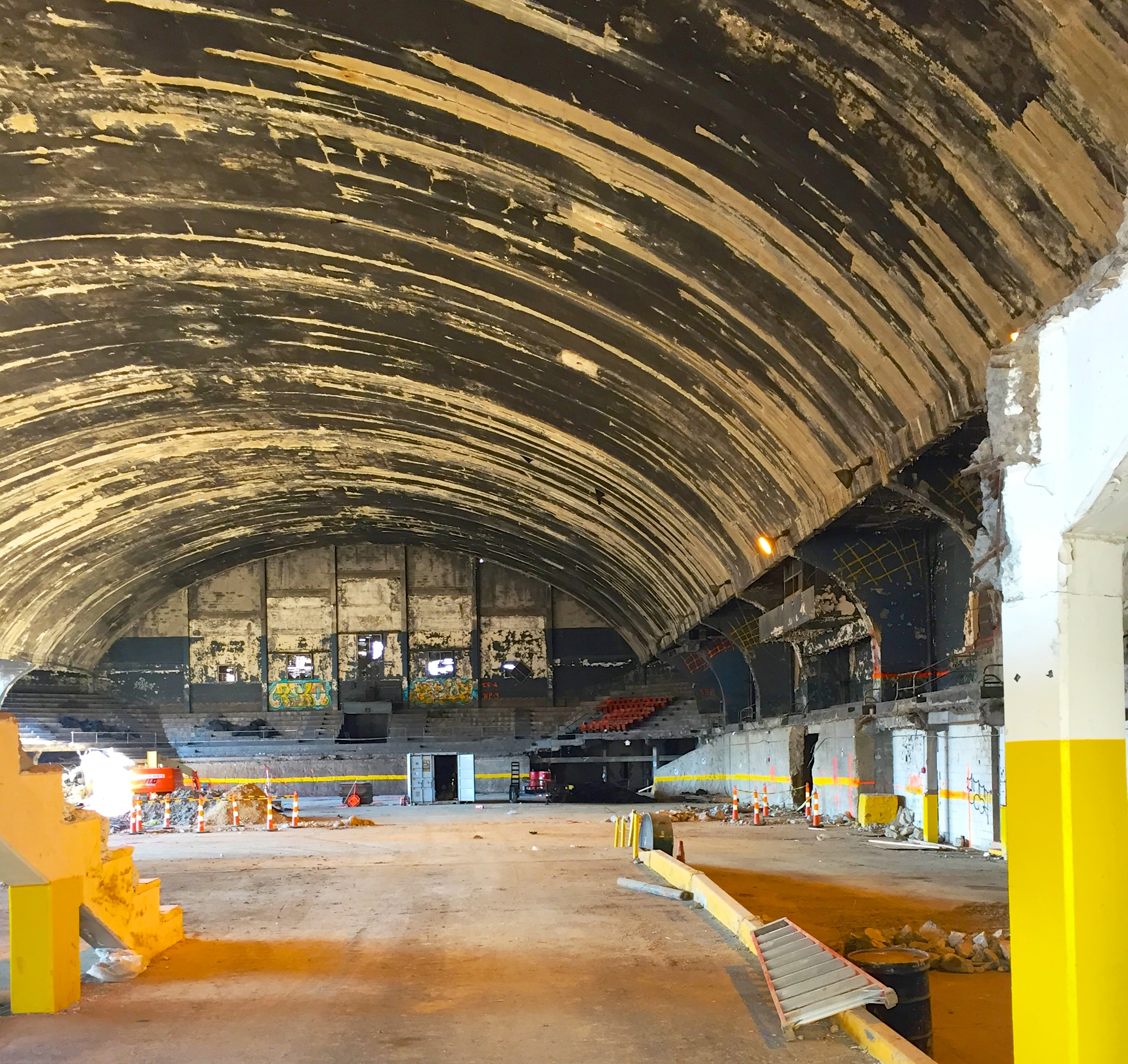
View inside the arena looking south in 2015

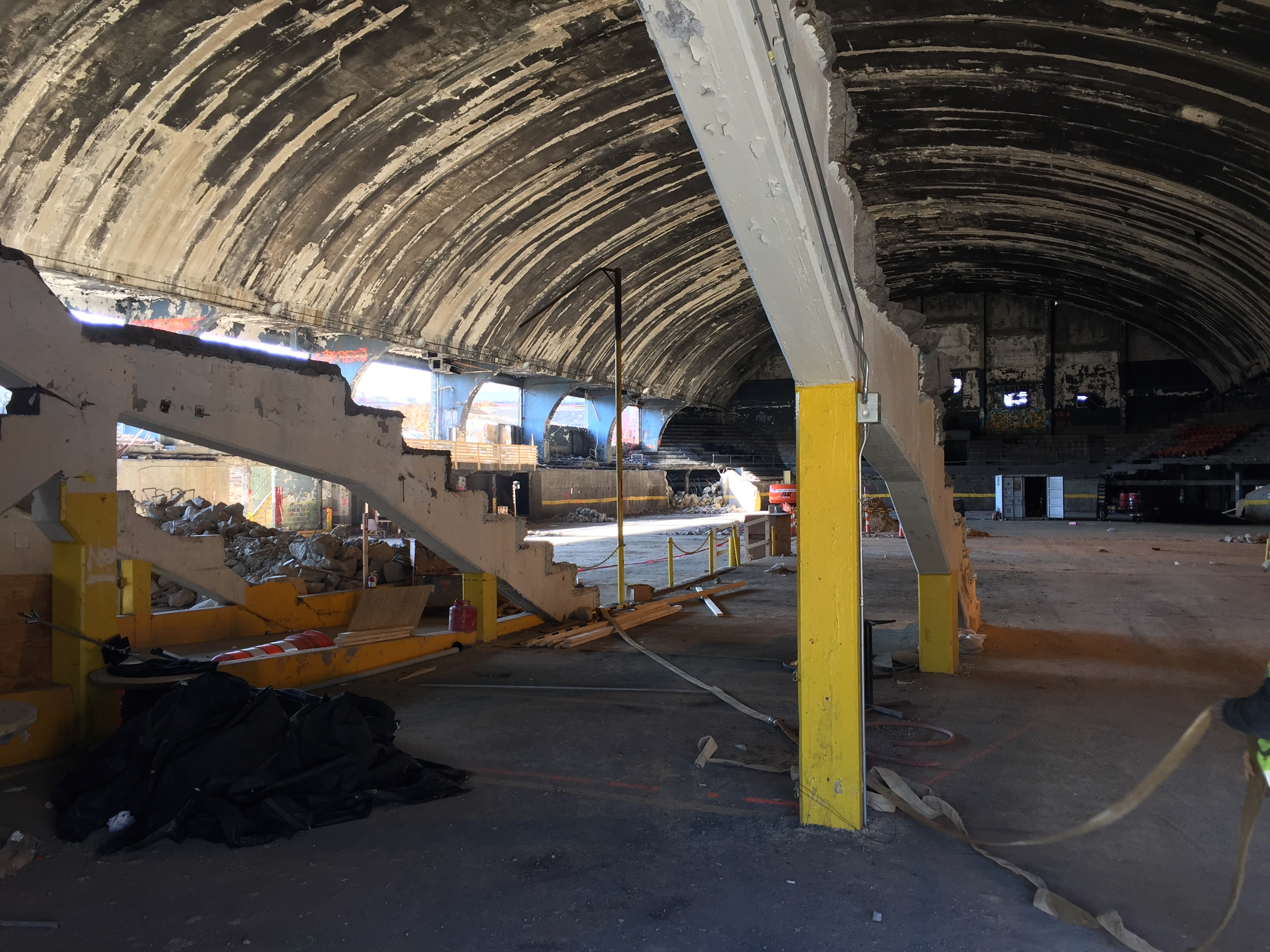
View inside the arena looking north in 2015

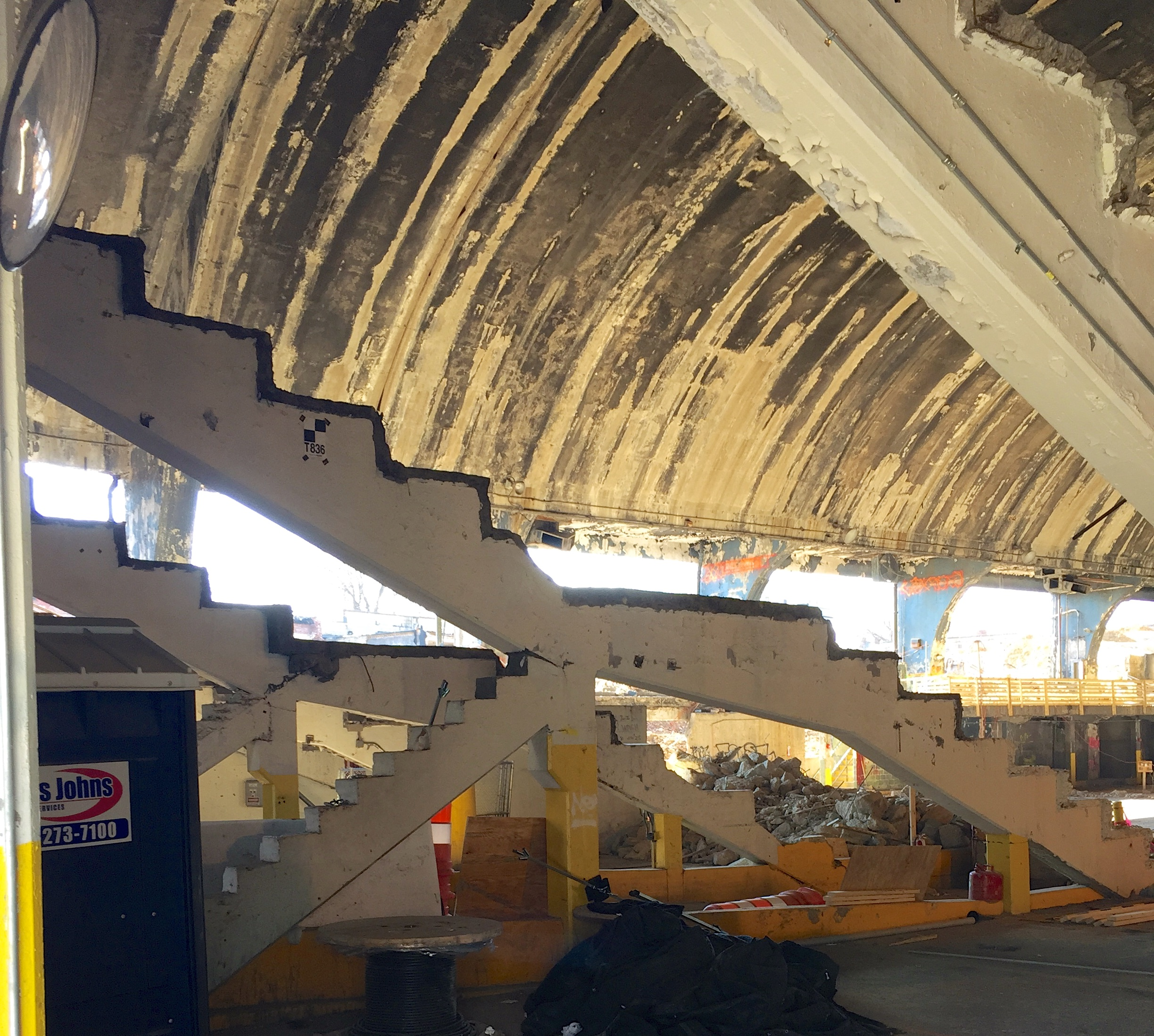
Former location of the seats and stairs in 2015

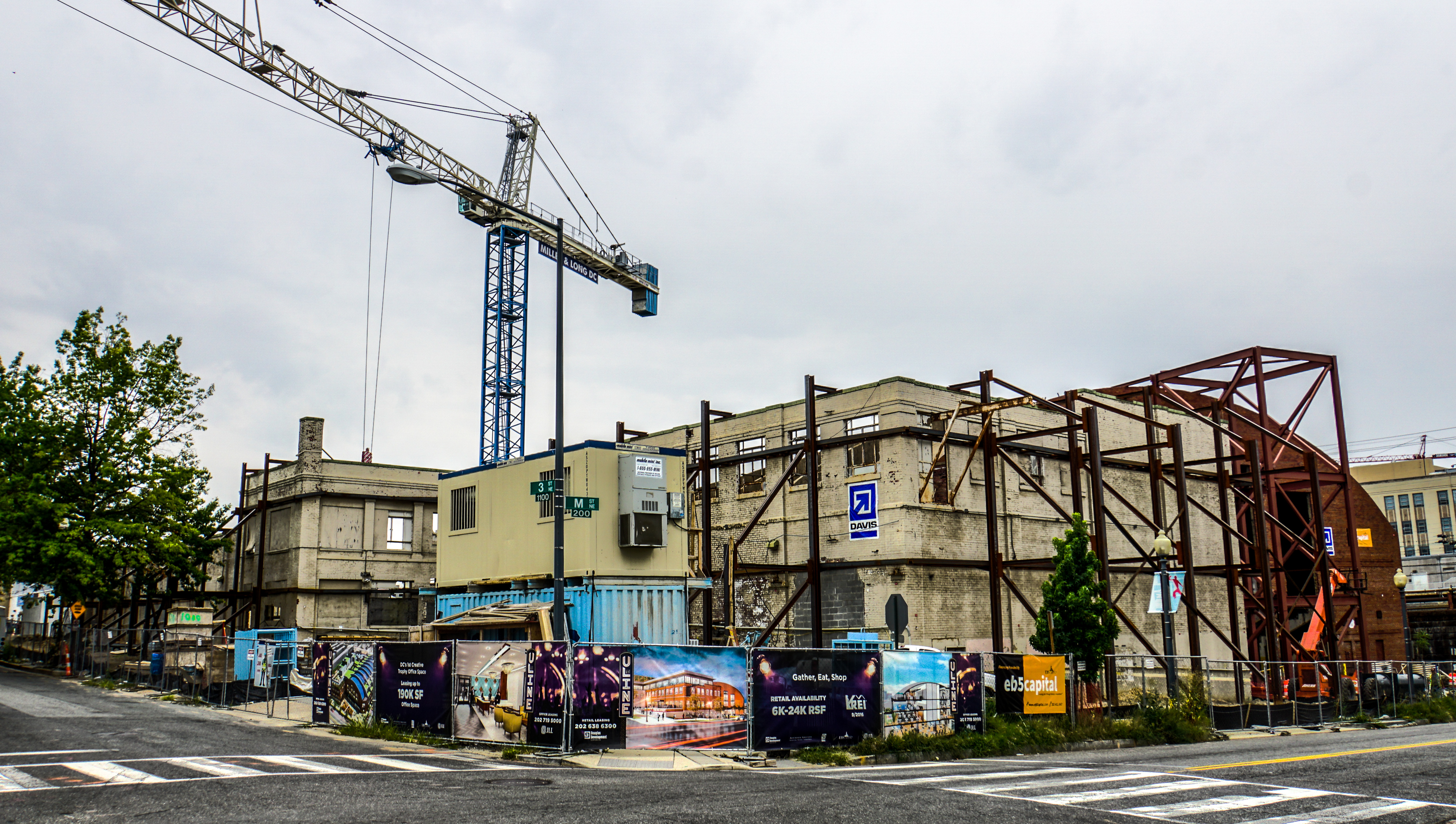
View of the old factory in 2015

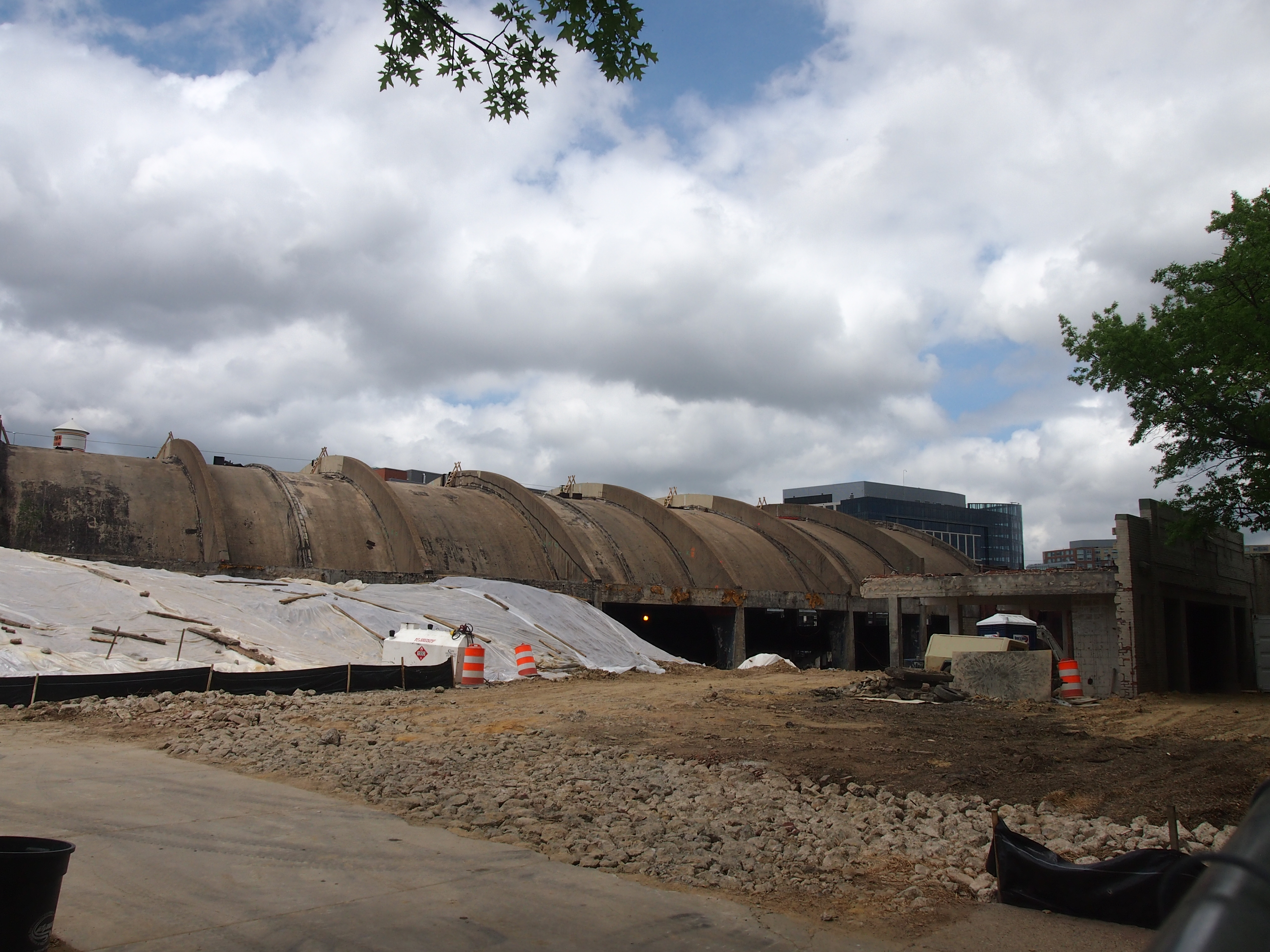
Detail view of the roof during the construction in 2015

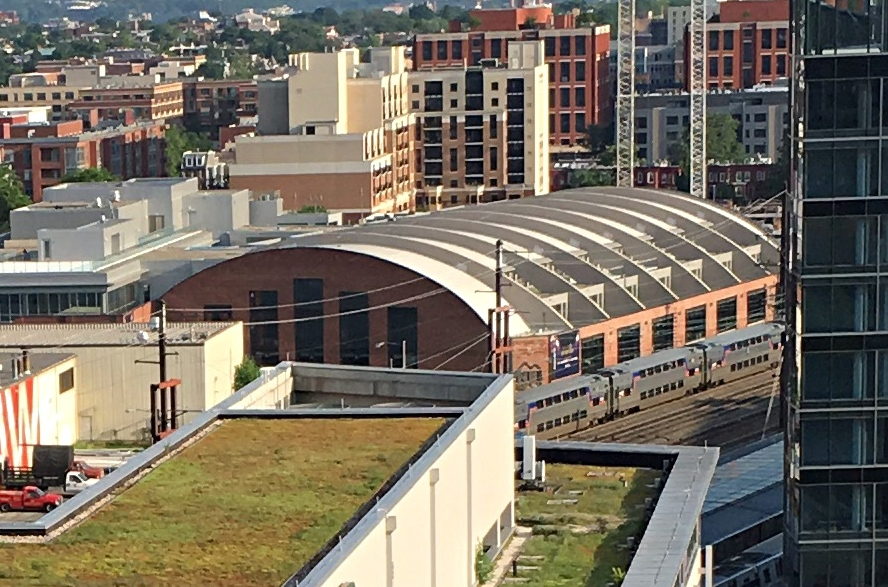
The arena is now an REI store

On September 17, 2018, Antunovich Associates, the architecture firm that worked with Douglas Development in restoring the arena, opened their DC office on the ground level of Uline Arena. The new office fronts directly onto Third Street Northeast, adjacent to the main building lobby.

== See also ==
Sports in Washington, D.C.
