= Ken Schultz (ice hockey) =

Canadian ice hockey player

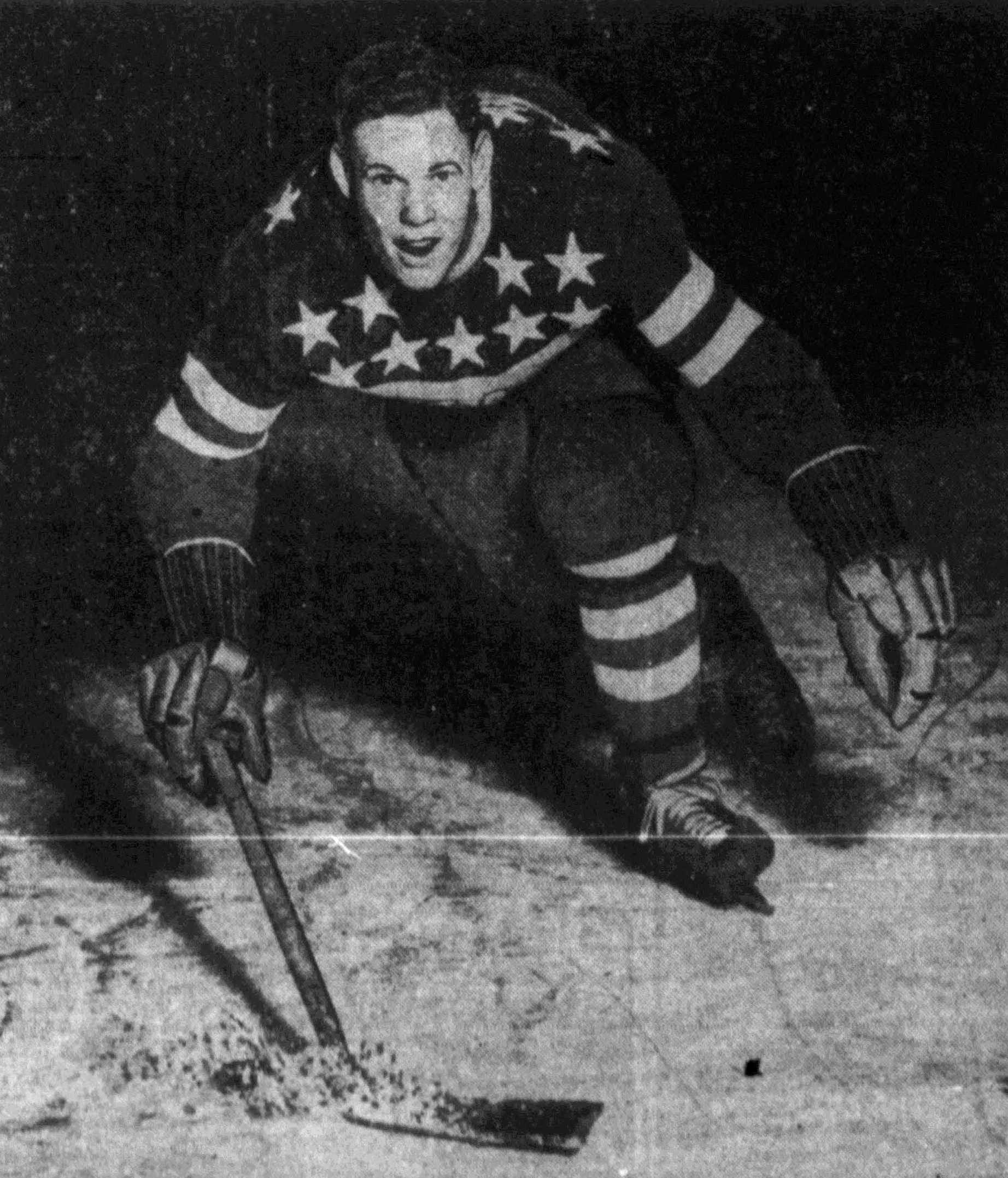
- Schultz, circa 1946
- Born: June 21, 1925; Preston, Ontario, Canada
- Died: December 1, 2003 (aged 78)
- Height: 6 ft 0 in (183 cm)
- Weight: 175 lb (79 kg; 12 st 7 lb)
- Position: Center
- Shot: Left
- Played for: Pittsburgh Hornets; Providence Reds; Hershey Bears; Washington Lions; Cleveland Barons; Toledo Mercurys
- Playing career: 1941–1957

Kenneth Monroe Schultz (June 21, 1925 – December 1, 2003) was a Canadian professional hockey player who played for the Pittsburgh Hornets, Providence Reds, Hershey Bears. Washington Lions and Cleveland Barons in the American Hockey League.
