= H. Samuel =

Mass-market jewellery chain

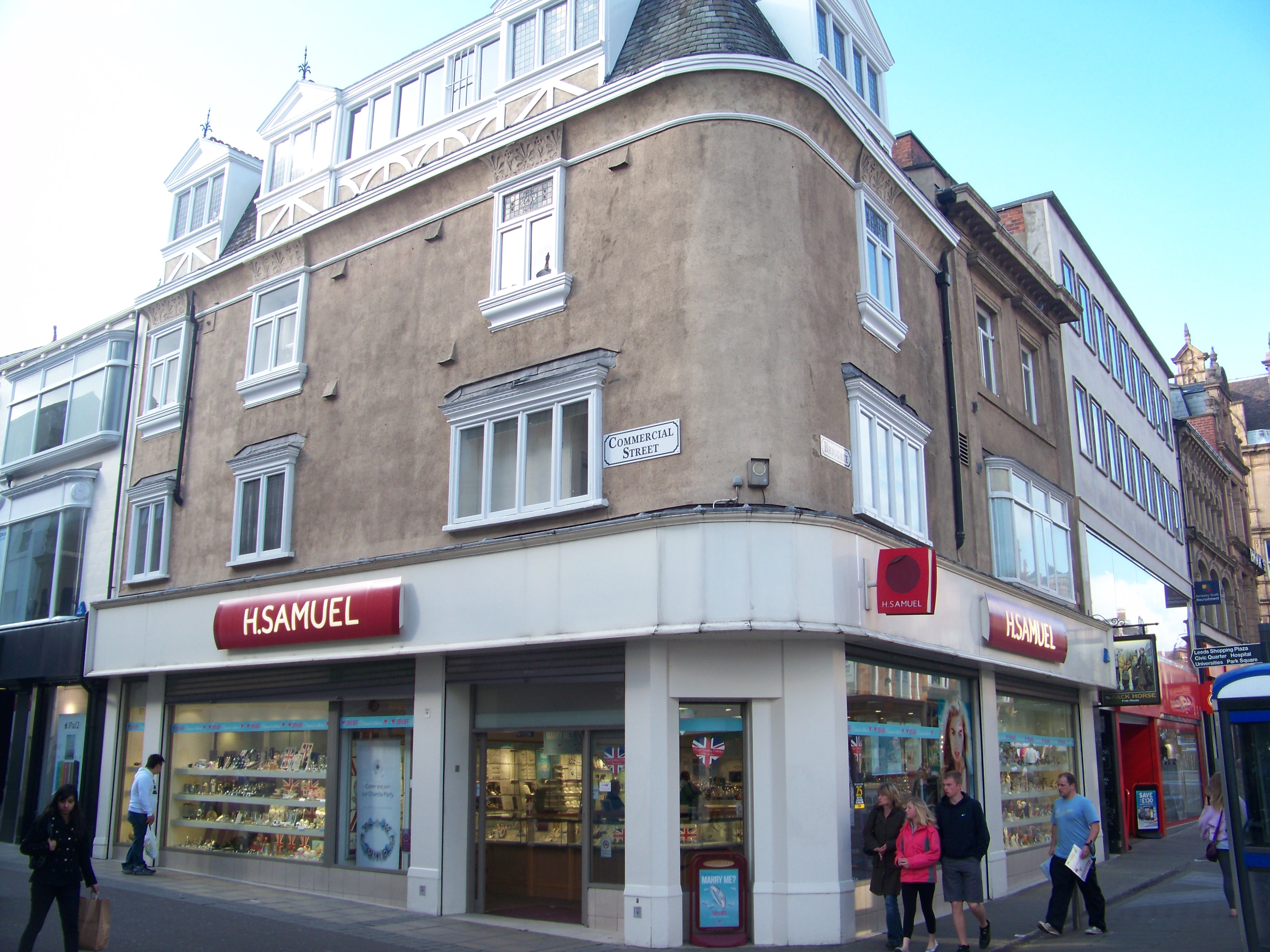
- H. Samuel on the junction of Briggate and Commercial Street in Leeds
- Company type: Subsidiary
- Industry: Retail
- Founded: (Liverpool, England) 1862
- Founder: Harriet Samuel
- Headquarters: Imperial Place 3, Maxwell Road, Borehamwood, WD6 1JN
- Products: Jewellery
- Number of employees: 17,200 (2008) (Signet Group Results)
- Parent: Signet Jewelers
- Website: hsamuel.co.uk

H. Samuel is a mass-market jewellery chain, operating in the United Kingdom and Ireland. It is part of the Signet Group of jewellery retailers.

== History ==
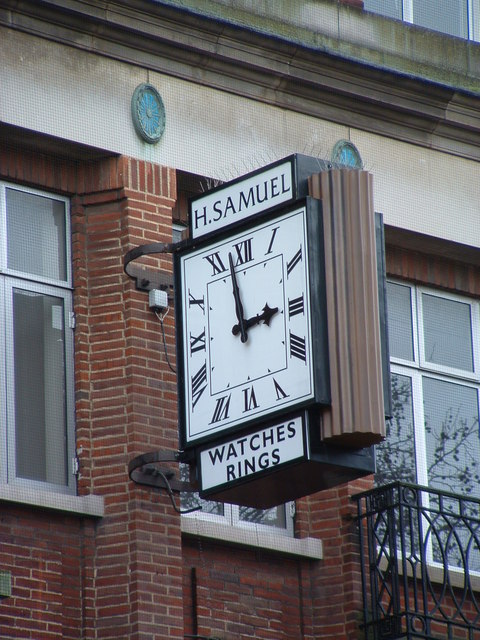
The large clock outside H Samuel's premises in Norwich

In the mid-1800s, Moses and Lewis Samuel ran a well-known clock-making and silversmith business in Liverpool. Harriet Samuel (née Wolf), Moses Samuel's daughter-in-law, took over the business and moved it to Manchester's Market Street, where she ran the mail-order side, closely followed by branches in Rochdale and throughout Lancashire. The company registered trademarks for its Acme and Climax watches by 1884.

The first H. Samuel retail store opened in Preston in 1890. By the turn of the century, H. Samuel had opened over 10 branches, and by 1914 it had about 50. To accommodate the growing business, the company moved to larger headquarters in Birmingham in 1912.

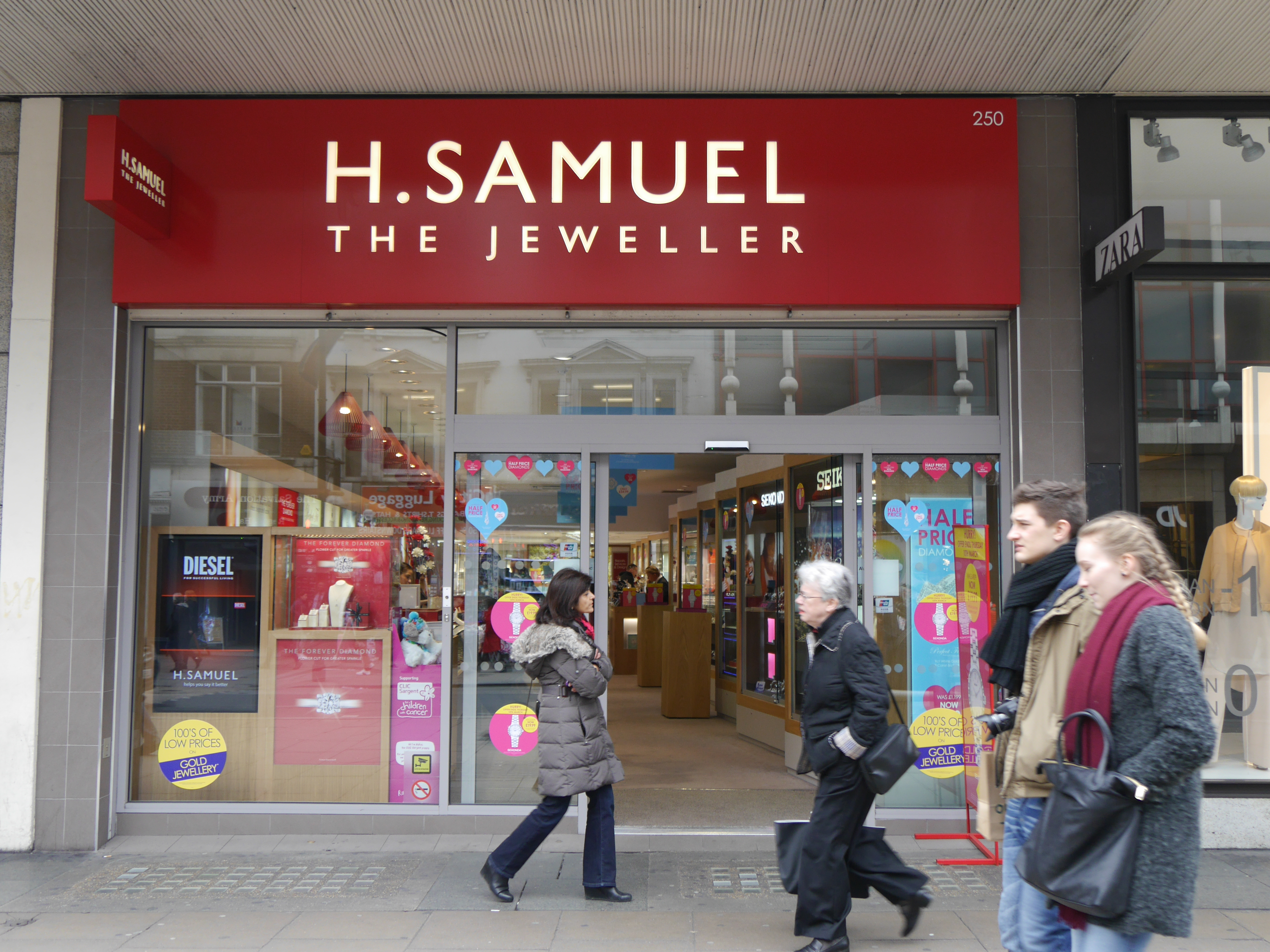
H. Samuel, Oxford Street, London, 2016

After the Second World War, Harriet's grandsons, Gilbert Edgar and Robert Edgar, took over as chairman and vice chairman. In 1948, the company was listed on the London Stock Exchange. Gilbert was appointed a CBE for political and public services, was elected a Sheriff of the City of London, and was elected Master of the Clockmakers' Company. Meanwhile, the number of H. Samuel stores rose to over two hundred nationwide.

After the brothers' deaths in the late 1970s, Robert's son took over as chairman. In 1984, H. Samuel acquired the James Walker Group, which doubled the company's presence in the UK.

H. Samuel was bought by Ratner's Jewellers in 1986; after that brand's spectacular fall from grace in 1992, the Ratner Group rebranded as the Signet Group, and existing Ratner's stores were rebranded with the H. Samuel name.

In 2005 the chain launched its first e-commerce site.

In 2008, the company employed 17,200 people. There are 303 stores as of 16 February 2015.
