= ULTRA Diamonds =

American jewelry seller (1991–2012)

- Industry: Retail
- Founded: 1991; 35 years ago (Gurnee, Illinois)
- Defunct: November 2, 2012; 13 years ago
- Fate: Acquired by Signet Jewelers
- Headquarters: Chicago, Illinois
- Key people: Daniel H. Marks (President & CEO)
- Products: Jewelry
- Revenue: $140 million (Last reported, February 2011)
- Total assets: $50 million (July 2009)
- Number of employees: 1,500 (July 2009)

ULTRA Diamonds was a seller of fine jewelry in factory outlet and value centers in the United States. ULTRA was a manufacturer as well as a direct importer of diamonds, gemstones, and gold jewelry. At one point, Ultra operated over 100 stores in outlet centers and 38 other format locations (primarily licensed jewelry departments). The company went through bankruptcy in 2001–2002 and again after the 2008 financial crisis. On November 2, 2012, the company was acquired by Signet Jewelers.

== History ==
ULTRA opened its first store in August 1991 in Gurnee, Illinois. Daniel H. Marks, founder, president, and CEO, is a third-generation jeweler. Prior to founding ULTRA, he was a principal with Marks Brothers Jewelers (parent company of the Whitehall and the Lundstrom jewelry chains). The company's retail philosophy was to offer "off-market" pricing with lowered profit margins than what had been traditional in the industry.

Although market share grew from 1991 through 2000, in 2009, ULTRA filed for bankruptcy for the second time under Chapter 11, Title 11, United States Code. In 2008, sales decreased 10.8%, including an 18.9% sales decrease over the critical holiday season.

In 2009, ULTRA emerged from the months-long bankruptcy with a strengthened capital base. This was accomplished when Bank of America provided a $30 million line of credit. Crystal Financial assumed 56% ownership of Ultra in exchange for converting half of the company's debt into equity. Ultra's unsecured creditors held an 18% ownership share in the jewelry chain, plus a $3 million note. The upper management team also took salary cuts while assuming a 26% ownership interest. ULTRA closed 30 "under performing locations" during the bankruptcy and continued operations at 178 locations.

On October 24, 2012, Signet Jewelers announced that it had signed an agreement to acquire Ultra Stores from Crystal Financial and its other stockholders for approximately $57 million in cash. Signet did not assume any debt in connection with the acquisition. The acquisition was completed on November 2, 2012. Signet converted most of Ultra's stores to Kay Jewelers Outlets.
