= Harriet Samuel =

English businesswoman

- Born: Harriet Wolf; 8 March 1836; London, England
- Died: 6 February 1908 (aged 71)

Harriet Samuel (née Wolf) (8 March 1836 – 6 February 1908) was an English businesswoman and the founder of H. Samuel, one of the United Kingdom's best-known high street jewellery retailers.

== Life and career ==
Harriet Wolf was born on 8 March 1836 in London, the daughter of Schreiner Wolf of Great Yarmouth and his wife Matida. When her husband Walter Samuel (1829–1863) died, she took over her father-in-law's Liverpool clock- and watch-making business and moved it to Manchester, where Edgar, her son, took over the firm's retailing side, while she headed its mail order business. The first H. Samuel shop opened in Preston in 1890. The business then developed into one of Britain's best-known high street jewellery retailers. After Samuel's death, the headquarters of H. Samuel was moved to Birmingham and, as of 2019, it has over 300 branches throughout the UK.

She married Walter Samuel and they had four children together: Evelyn, Arthur, Florence and Edgar.

Samuel died on 6 February 1908 and is buried at Willesden Jewish Cemetery.
