= Washington Lions (EHL) =

- City: Washington, D.C.
- League: Eastern Hockey League
- Operated: 1944–1947; 1951–1957
- Home arena: Uline Arena

Franchise history
- 1944–1947: Washington Lions
- 1951–1957: Washington Lions
- 1957–1959: Washington Presidents

The Washington Lions were a professional ice hockey teams based in Washington, D.C. The Lions were founded as a member of the Eastern Amateur Hockey League as a replacement for the AHL team of the same name. After World War II, the original Lions franchise returned and this club went dormant. The AHL club folded in 1949 and, two years later, this club was resurrected. The Lions played in the EAHL and its successor league until 1957 when it was purchased by Harry Glynne III, and Jerry DeLise. The new owners immediately rebranded the club as the 'Washington Presidents'. The franchise survived for two more years before disbanding in 1959.

== Season-by-season results ==
Season	Games	Won	Lost	Tied	Points	Goals for	Goals against	Standing
1951–1952	36	9	24	3	21	124	155	
1952–1953	60	26	31	3	55	201	215	
1954–1955	49	26	21	2	54	204	175	
1955–1956	64	33	28	3	69	258	267	
1956–1957	64	18	45	1	37	256	397	

== Playoffs ==
The team made the playoffs in 1952–1953 season but lost in the first round.
