= Ernest Jones (retailer) =

British retail jeweller and watchmaker

- Company type: Subsidiary
- Industry: Retail
- Founded: 1949
- Headquarters: Birmingham, UK
- Number of locations: 180
- Products: Jewellery
- Parent: Signet Jewelers
- Website: Ernest Jones

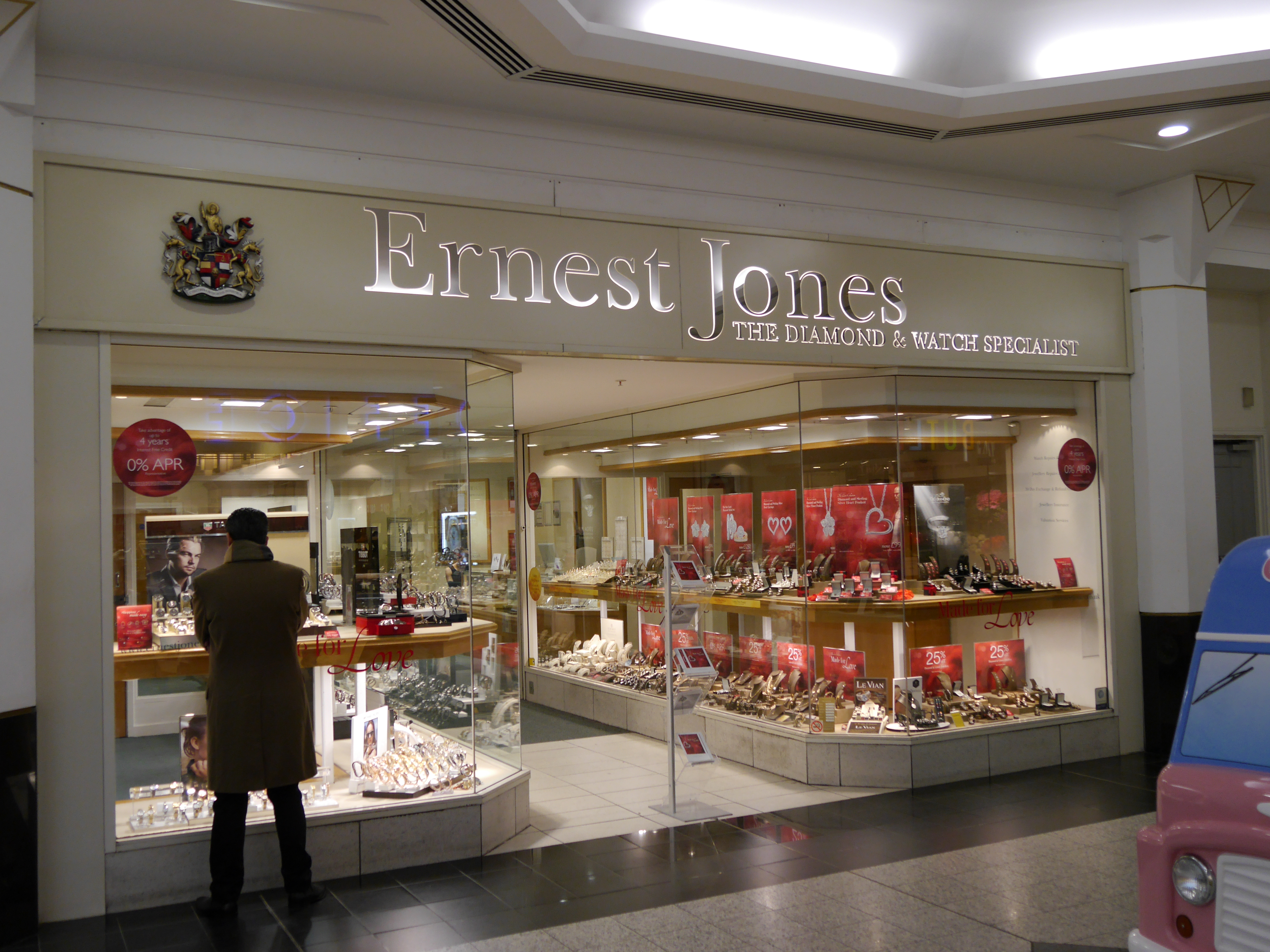
Ernest Jones, Putney Exchange, London

Ernest Jones is a British jeweller and watchmaker. Established in 1949 by Ernest and Stella Weinstein, its first store was opened in Oxford Street, London. Ernest Jones specialises in diamonds and watches, stocking brands such as Breitling SA, Omega SA, TAG Heuer, Cartier SA, Gucci, and Emporio Armani. Ernest Jones is part of the Signet Jewelers group and has approximately 180 stores across the United Kingdom.
