= Sterling Jewelers =

American specialty jewelry company

Sterling Jewelers, Inc.
- Type: Subsidiary
- Industry: Retail
- Founded: August 14, 1910; 116 years ago
- Founder: Henry Shaw
- Headquarters: 375 Ghent Road, Fairlawn, Ohio, United States
- Number of locations: 1,586 stores (Feb. 2018)
- Products: Jewelry
- Revenue: US$3.82 billion (2017)
- Number of employees: 13,901 (Feb. 2018)
- Parent: Signet Jewelers
- Divisions: Belden Jewelers; Goodman Jewelers; Jared; JB Robinson Jewelers; Kay Jewelers; LeRoy's Jewelers; Marks & Morgan Jewelers; Osterman Jewelers; Rogers Jewelers; Shaw's Jewelers; Weisfield Jewelers
- Website: www.sterlingjewelers.com

Sterling Jewelers, Inc. is an American specialty jewelry company headquartered in Akron, Ohio through the Fairlawn suburb. The company was founded in 1910 by Henry Shaw (the father of Jerry Shaw, Sterling's chairman emeritus), at LeRoy's Jewelers in Lorain, Ohio. Sterling Jewelers is a wholly owned subsidiary of UK-based Signet Jewelers Limited (listed on the New York Stock Exchange under the symbol SIG), having been acquired in 1987.

== History ==
A Kay Jewelers-branded store in Knoxville, Tennessee

Signet Jewelers, based in the UK, is a specialty retail jeweler, with stores in the United States, United Kingdom, Canada, Republic of Ireland, Puerto Rico, and Channel Islands. Approximately 78% of company sales are derived from the 12 different store brands operating in the U.S. They include Belden Jewelers, Ernest Jones, Goodman Jewelers, H.Samuel, JB Robinson Jewelers, JamesAllen.com, Jared, Kay Jewelers, Le Roy's Jewelers, Mappins, Marks & Morgan Jewelers, Osterman Jewelers, Peoples, Piercing Pagoda, Rogers Jewelers, Shaw's Jewelers, Weisfield Jewelers, and Zales.

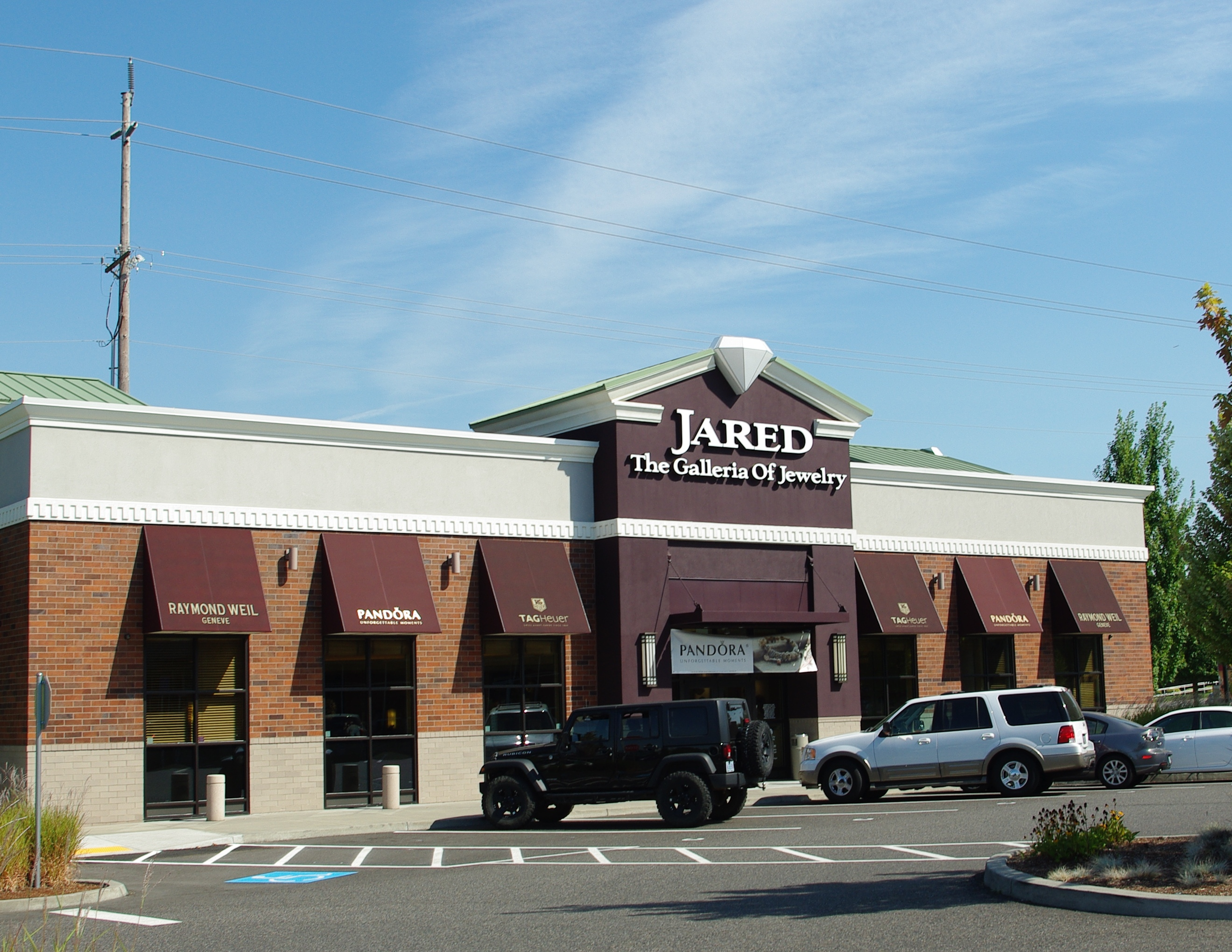
A Jared-branded store in Hillsboro, Oregon in September 2012

According to the company's February 2, 2008, Annual Report & Accounts, Sterling has the number-two position in the U.S. with a 4.2% market share of all jewelry purchases. Sterling has a leading 8.8% market share in the specialty jeweler market share (highest in the sector).

Since 2009, Sterling Jewelers has been a corporate sponsor of St. Jude Children's Research Hospital, making a number of donations to many of the hospital's building, clinical, and research projects. In February 2015, the company's senior vice president of field operations estimated that the company's past commitments to the St. Jude amounted to more than $90 million.

In February 2014, Signet Jewelers Ltd. agreed to buy Zale Corporation, with Zale shareholders receiving US$21 per share in cash in a US$1.4 billion deal. This merger created a $6.2 billion firm.

In August 2017, it was announced that Signet Jewelers Ltd. agreed to buy R2Net, owner of online jewelry retailer JamesAllen.com, for $328 million.

== Sex discrimination and sexual harassment proceedings ==
Sterling Jewelers is being sued by 69,000 female employees and former employees for sexual harassment and sex discrimination in an ongoing class arbitration proceeding, In February 2017, The Washington Post obtained and reported on declarations made by about 250 women and men who worked for the company. The declarations state that men in supervisory roles at Kay Jewelers and Jared the Galleria of Jewelry sexually harassed younger saleswomen by groping, making demeaning comments, and demanding of sexual favors in return for promotions and higher pay. Signet Jewelers's CEO Mark Light and other senior executives were among those accused of demanding sexual favors. The former employees also accuse Sterling of wage violations, contending that women at the company were "systematically paid less than men and passed over for promotions given to less experienced male colleagues." The company denies the allegations.

Separately, the Equal Employment Opportunity Commission brought sex discrimination claims against the company in 2008. In May 2017, the EEOC and Sterling Jewelers settled the case by a consent decree; under the settlement, Sterling Jewelers does not have to pay a monetary sum and does not acknowledge any wrongdoing, but agreed to adopt new anti-discrimination policies and to hire an independent expert to review the company's compensation and promotion policies. The EEOC settlement does not affect the separate class action proceeding.

== Credit card practices case ==
On January 16, 2019, Sterling Jewelers paid $11 million under a settlement with the Consumer Financial Protection Bureau. The Bureau's investigations concluded that Sterling violated the Consumer Financial Protection Act of 2010 by signing customers up for store credit without their knowledge or consent and enrolling them in payment-protection insurance. The investigations also found that the company violated the Truth in Lending Act when customers were signed-up for credit-card accounts without receiving an application from them. Sterling's parent company, Signet Jewelers Ltd, refuted the allegations but then accepted the settlement.

== Store closings ==
In April 2019, Sterling Jewelers announced the closure of 150 stores, mostly in mall locations that see poor foot traffic or with duplicate stores in the Sterling chain (such as a Kay and a Zales).
