= Signet Jewelers =

Jewelry retailer

Signet Jewelers Ltd.

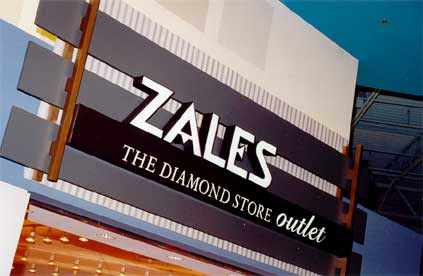
- Zales Outlet - Sugarloaf Mills
- Formerly: Ratner Group (1949–1993); Signet Group plc (1993–2008)
- Type: Public
- Traded as: NYSE: SIG; S&P 600 component
- Industry: Retail
- Incorporated: Bermuda
- Founded: 1949; 77 years ago
- Headquarters: Fairlawn, Ohio, United States
- Number of locations: 2,642 (2025)
- Key people: Helen McCluskey (chair); J.K. Symancyk (CEO); Joan Hilson (CFO)
- Products: Jewellery
- Brands: Blue Nile; Belden Jewelers; Ernest Jones; Goodman Jewelers; H. Samuel; JamesAllen.com; Jared; Jared Vault; JB Robinson Jewelers; Kay Jewelers; LeRoy's Jewelers; Leslie Davis; Mappins; Marks & Morgan Jewelers; Osterman Jewelers; Peoples Jewellers; Banter by Piercing Pagoda; Rogers Jewelers; Shaw's Jewelers; Weisfield Jewelers; Zales
- Revenue: ▼US$6.70 billion (2025)
- Operating income: ▼US$111 million (2025)
- Net income: ▼US$61.2 million (2025)
- Total assets: ▼US$5.73 billion (2025)
- Total equity: ▼US$1.85 billion (2025)
- Number of employees: 27,595 (2025)
- Subsidiaries: Blue Nile; H. Samuel; Ernest Jones; Sterling Jewelers; Zale Corporation
- Website: signetjewelers.com
- Footnotes; Financials as of February 1, 2025.

Signet Jewelers Ltd. (Ratner Group 1949–1993 then Signet Group plc to September 2008) is, as of 2025, the world's largest retailer of diamond jewellery. The company is domiciled in Bermuda and headquartered in Akron, Ohio through the Fairlawn suburb, and is listed on the New York Stock Exchange. The group operates in the middle-market jewellery segment and holds number one positions in the US, Canada, and UK speciality jewellery markets. Certain brands, like Ernest Jones in the UK, operate in the upper middle market. Signet Jewelers owns and operates the companies Blue Nile, Zales, Kay Jewelers, Jared, JamesAllen.com, and others.

== History ==
The group was founded in 1949 and grew organically before expanding rapidly through a series of acquisitions in the late 1980s and early 1990s. It was formerly known as the Ratner Group and was run by Gerald Ratner.

The company moved its primary stock market listing from the London to the New York Stock Exchange on 11 September 2008, changing its name to Signet Jewelers Limited in the process. The firm moved its country of domicile from the United Kingdom to Bermuda on the same day, although it retains headquarters in Akron, Ohio. In 2012, Signet acquired ULTRA Diamonds and converted most of ULTRA stores to Jared Vault & Kay Jewelers Outlets.

In February 2014, Signet Jewelers Ltd. agreed to buy Zale Corporation, with Zale shareholders receiving US$21 a share in cash in $1.4 billion deal. This merger created a $6.2 billion firm.

In July 2017, Virginia Drosos was appointed CEO of Signet, replacing Mark Light, who had been CEO since October 2014. A month later it was announced that Signet agreed to buy R2Net, owner of online jewellery retailer James Allen, for $328 million. The company announced the sale of its revolving credit portfolio to Alliance Data Systems and Genesis Financial Solutions that same year.

During the 2020 COVID-19 pandemic in the United Kingdom, Signet announced it would not reopen 80 of its UK stores after the shutdown. In the United States, following mandatory temporary closures of stores due to the pandemic, online sales rose 58 percent to $1.2 billion during the fiscal year ended on January 30, 2021, compared to the previous year. Total sales, however, fell 15 percent to $5.2 billion. To operate more efficiently, CFO Joan Hilson stated the company plans on reducing the hours of operation for stores outside of malls and adjusting staffing depending on foot traffic, as well as eliminating costs through its supply chain. The company planned to close around 100 of its bricks-and-mortar stores in 2021 in an ongoing effort to reduce their reliance on mall-based locations and focus more on online distribution.

== Operations ==
As of February 2018, Signet operated 2,960 stores in the United States, United Kingdom, Canada, Republic of Ireland, and Channel Islands.

== Litigation ==
In May 2017, one of Signet's subsidiaries, Sterling Jewelers, settled a federal civil lawsuit brought by the US Equal Employment Opportunity Commission accusing it of discriminating against female employees. Signet was also subject to at least two class actions through Sterling Jewelers and one of its subsidiaries, Jared—the Galleria of Jewelry. It was sued by 44,000 female employees and former employees for discrimination. The action was launched in 2008 and went to go to trial in 2018.

In January 2019, Sterling Jewelers settled allegations that it had signed customers up for credit cards without their permission, paying $11 million to the Consumer Financial Protection Bureau and New York Attorney General's office.
