= Blue Nile Inc. =

Online jeweler

- Type: Subsidiary
- Industry: Retail
- Founded: 1999; 27 years ago
- Founder: Mark Vadon
- Headquarters: New York City, U.S.
- Number of locations: 25 Stores
- Products: Diamonds & Jewelry
- Revenue: ▲US$ 480 million (2015)
- Operating income: ▲US$ 16.05 million (2015)
- Net income: ▲US$ 10.53 million (2015)
- Total assets: ▲US$ 157.4 million (2015)
- Total equity: ▲US$ 18.46 million (2015)
- Number of employees: 1000 (2023)
- Parent: Signet Jewelers
- Website: bluenile.com

Blue Nile Inc. is an American jewellery company, based in New York City. In February 2017, it became a subsidiary of Bain Capital. In 2022, Blue Nile was acquired by Signet Jewelers.

== History ==
The company that became Blue Nile began in 1995 when Doug Williams of Williams & Son Inc. of Seattle started a website to sell diamonds online. Mark C. Vadon, then a management consultant at Bain & Company, purchased a diamond engagement ring from the site in 1998. In 1999, Vadon raised $6 million to purchase 85% of the company and improve the website. The company's name was changed to Blue Nile in November 1999. During the next year, the company raised an additional $44 million. Investors included Bessemer Venture Partners, Kleiner Perkins Caufield & Byers. Blue Nile raised $76 million in its IPO on May 18, 2004. Merrill Lynch & Co., Bear Stearns Cos. and Thomas Weisel Partners LLC managed the IPO, sharing fees of $5.4 million. The initial public offering of shares in Blue Nile Inc, rose 39% in first-day trading, closing at $28.40.

Although the company had $44 million in revenue in 2000, it lost $30 million because it spent $40 million in television advertising. Its investors contributed an additional $7 million in 2001. In 2006, Blue Nile sold $197 million in engagement rings and wedding bands, compared to $186 million for Tiffany & Co.

In November 2011, CEO Diane Irvine, who had been with the company for 12 years and its CEO since 2008, abruptly resigned. Irvine was replaced on an interim basis by senior vice president and general manager of international Vijay Talwar. In March 2012, Harvey Kanter, former CEO of MooseJaw, was named the new CEO.

In 2015, Blue Nile reported net sales of US$473 million and net income of US$9.7 million. Blue Nile promotes itself as a supplier of ethically sourced diamonds and endorses a zero-tolerance policy towards conflict diamonds.

In the summer of 2015, Blue Nile opened their first showroom at Roosevelt Field Mall on Long Island, New York. The company has since opened showrooms at shopping malls in White Plains NY, Tysons Corner VA, Salem NH, Tigard OR, and Bellevue WA.

Blue Nile was awarded a Bizrate Circle of Excellence Award winner in 2016.

== CEOs ==
=== Mark Vadon (1999–2008) ===
Vadon had been CEO of the company since its inception, but in 2008, he ascended to the post of executive chairman. In 2011, following the resignation of CEO Diane Irvine, he took on a more active role in the company.

=== Diane Irvine (2008–2011) ===
Irvine was promoted from president to CEO in 2008 and ran the company for three years. During her tenure as CEO she helped grow Blue Nile from sales of $14 million to over $300 million.

=== Harvey Kanter (2012–2017) ===
Harvey was appointed as Blue Nile's CEO February 2012 and was at the helm of the company for five years before stepping down to give way to Jason Goldberg. He came to the Seattle-based e-tailer from Moosejaw Mountaineering and Backcountry Travel Inc., a Detroit-based maker of outdoor gear and apparel. Kanter is the chairman of the board at Blue Nile. While CEO Kanter led the once publicly traded diamond company to be purchased by Bain Capital Private Equity and Bow Street LLC for $500 million.

=== Jason Goldberger (2017–2019) ===
In June 2017, former chief digital officer of Target, Jason Goldberger, was appointed Blue Nile's CEO. Goldberger also spent time at Gilt Groupe, Hayneedle and Amazon. Goldberg departed Blue Nile in 2019 while the interim position was held by Eric Anderson from Bain Capital Private Equity.

=== Sean Kell (2019–2023) ===
Before joining Blue Nile in 2019, Kell was Chief Executive Officer of A Place for Mom, where he was responsible for overall brand management and business expansion.

== Acquisition ==
Bain Capital Private Equity and Bow Street LLC acquired Blue Nile in February 2017, for $40.75 per share (approximately $500 million). First announced in November 2016, shares of Blue Nile Inc. rose 34%.

Signet acquired Blue Nile for $360 million in 2022.
