= Zales =

American jewelry retailer

Zale Corporation

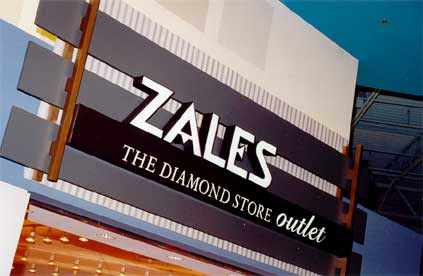
- Zales location in Sugarloaf Mills.
- Company type: Subsidiary
- Traded as: NYSE: ZLC
- Industry: Retailing
- Founded: 1924 (Wichita Falls, Texas)
- Headquarters: Irving, Texas, United States
- Number of locations: Zales and Gordon's: 781; Zales Outlet: 130; Peoples and Mappins: 206; Piercing Pagoda: 652 (October 2012)
- Key people: Terry Burman (Chairman); Terrell Wilson (CEO); Matthew Appel (CAO)
- Products: Jewelry
- Revenue: ▲US$1.888 billion (2013)
- Operating income: ▲$35.12 million (2013)
- Net income: ▲$10.01 million (2013)
- Total assets: ▲$1.187 billion (2013)
- Number of employees: 12,500 (July 2012)
- Parent: Signet Jewelers (2014–present)
- Divisions: Zales; Gordon's Jewelers; Peoples Jewellers; Mappins; Piercing Pagoda
- Website: www.zales.com

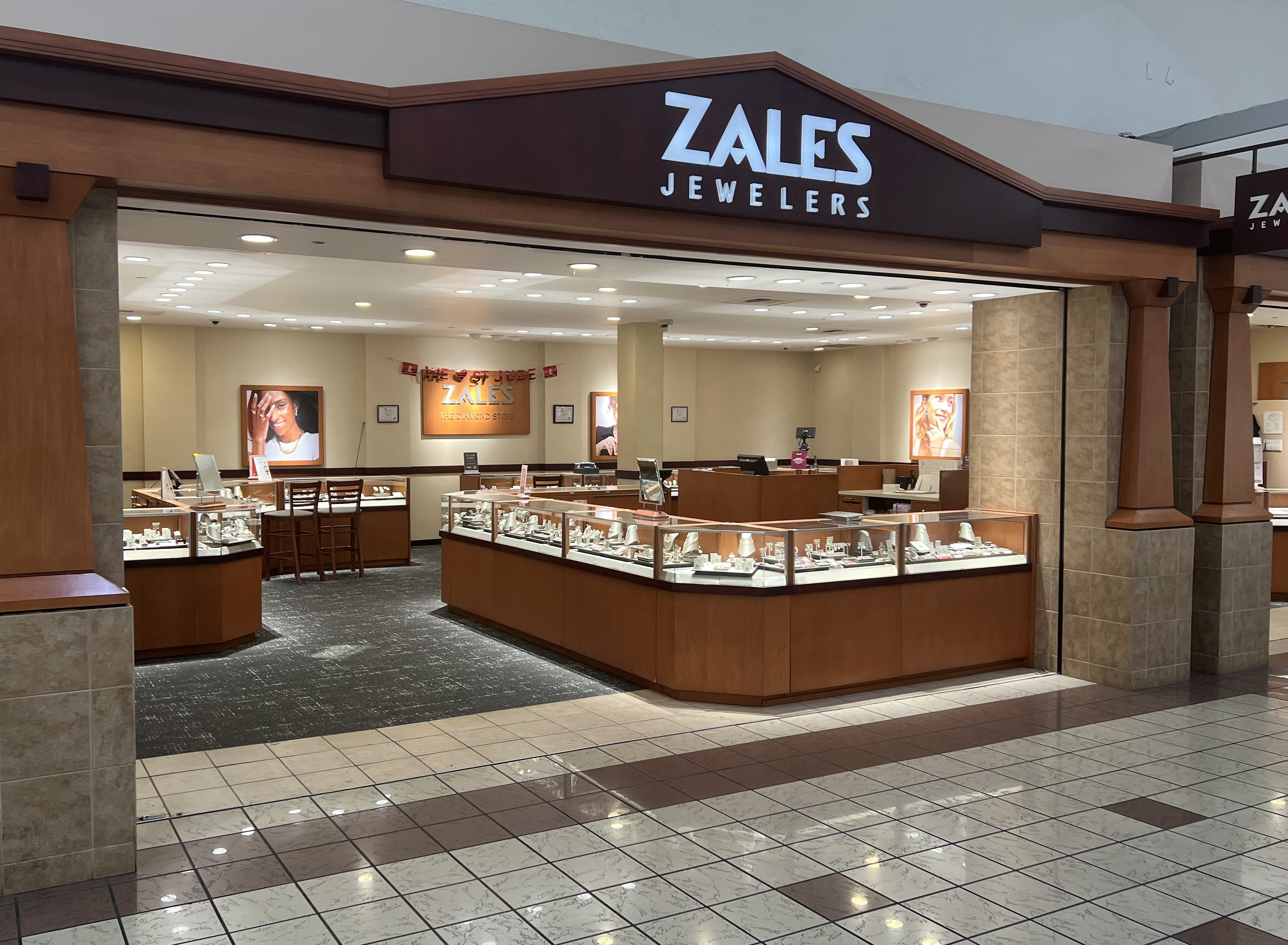
A Zales location in the Mershops Weberstown in Stockton, California, November 2024.

The Zale Corporation (best known as Zales) is an American jewelry retailer, incorporated in Delaware in 1993. The principal executive offices are located in Coppell, Texas.

== History ==
The company began in 1924 in Wichita Falls, Texas, [the building has been renovated and is currently being leased by The Korat bistro downtown, named so in honor of the first location] when the two Russian-Jewish immigrant brothers Morris (M. B.) Zale and William Zale (born Zalefsky/Zalewski), along with Ben Lipshy opened the first Zales Jewelers store (now a division in the multi-division company).

As a marketing strategy, the Zale brothers instituted a credit plan whereby customers could pay "a penny down and a dollar a week", making jewelry and other merchandise affordable for the average working American. The success of this credit policy led to the company expanding to a total of 12 stores in Oklahoma and Texas by 1941. Zales Jewelers moved its headquarters from Wichita Falls to Dallas in 1946. In 1998, online shopping was opened at www.zales.com.

== Corporate restructuring ==
In 1957, Zales Jewelers opened its first store in a shopping center—a major shift from operating only in downtown locations. The same year, Zales announced the initial public offering of its stock (ZLC) and began trading its public shares on the American Stock Exchange in 1958. In 1989, Zale acquired Gordon's Jewelers, which had been a major competitor. Zales bought the Skillern Drug pharmacy chain in the 1960s, but sold it in 1980.

Until 1986, Zales operated a catalog showroom called O. G. Wilson.

In 1986, People's Jewelers bought Zales.

On January 1, 1992, Zale filed for Chapter 11 bankruptcy.

In 1999 and 2000, Zale expanded with two major acquisitions: Peoples Jewellers of Canada and Piercing Pagoda.

In 2007, the company divested its Bailey Banks & Biddle brand to Finlay Enterprises.

In February 2014, Signet Jewelers agreed to buy Zale Corporation, with Zale shareholders receiving US$21 a share in cash in US$1.3 billion deal. The merger created a $6.2 billion firm.

In January 2017, Zales announced it would close a handful of its mall stores when the leases expire, to avoid duplication with former rival Kay Jewelers.

In 2018, the company moved its headquarters to a new building in Coppell, Texas.
