= Washington Lions (AHL) =

- City: Washington, D.C.
- League: American Hockey League
- Operated: 1941–1943; 1947–1949
- Home arena: Uline Arena

Franchise history
- 1941–1943: Washington Lions
- 1947–1949: Washington Lions
- 1949–1958: Cincinnati Mohawks

The Washington Lions were a professional ice hockey team based in Washington, D.C. The Lions were founded as a member of the American Hockey League in the 1941–42 season. They played for two seasons and then disbanded during World War II. Another Washington Lions team played in the Eastern Hockey League from 1944–47. The AHL Lions were resurrected in 1947. Following the 1948–49 season, the team was relocated to Cincinnati, Ohio as the Cincinnati Mohawks. The void was filled by a second team of the same name playing in the Eastern Hockey League, from 1951–53, and 1954–57, who later became the Washington Presidents, when purchased by Harry Glynne III, and Jerry DeLise.

== Season-by-season results ==
=== Regular season ===
Season	Games	Won	Lost	Tied	Points	Goals for	Goals against	Standing
1941–42	56	20	30	6	46	160	172	3rd, East
1942–43	56	14	34	8	36	184	272	3rd, East
1947–48	68	17	45	6	40	241	369	6th, East
1948–49	68	11	53	4	26	179	401	6th, East

=== Playoffs ===
Season	1st round	2nd round	Finals
1941–42	L, 0-2, Cleveland	—	—
1942–43	Out of playoffs		
1947–48	Out of playoffs		
1948–49	Out of playoffs		
