= Macgregor Kilpatrick Trophy =

US ice hockey trophy

The Macgregor Kilpatrick Trophy is presented annually to the AHL team that finishes the regular season with the most points or highest points percentage. The award is named after late former AHL board member Macgregor Kilpatrick.

The award was first presented for the 1997–98 season, the season after Kilpatrick died. Prior to the current trophy, the F. G. "Teddy" Oke Trophy was awarded from 1952–53 to 1960–61 and in 1976–77 to the team which finished first overall in the AHL, though at the time the league only had a single division.

== Winners ==
Team won the Calder Cup
Team lost the Calder Cup finals

Season	Team	Points/Pts%	Playoff result
1997–98	Philadelphia Phantoms	106	Won Calder Cup
1998–99	Providence Bruins	120	Won Calder Cup
1999–00	Hartford Wolf Pack	107	Won Calder Cup
2000–01	Worcester IceCats	108	Lost division finals (PRO)
2001–02	Bridgeport Sound Tigers	98	Lost Calder Cup Finals (CHI)
2002–03	Hamilton Bulldogs	110	Lost Calder Cup Finals (HOU)
2003–04	Milwaukee Admirals	102	Won Calder Cup
2004–05	Rochester Americans	112	Lost division finals (MTB)
2005–06	Grand Rapids Griffins	115	Lost Conference Finals (MIL)
2006–07	Hershey Bears	114	Lost Calder Cup Finals (HAM)
2007–08	Providence Bruins	117	Lost division finals (POR)
2008–09	Manitoba Moose	107	Lost Calder Cup Finals (HER)
2009–10	Hershey Bears	123	Won Calder Cup
2010–11	Wilkes-Barre/Scranton Penguins	117	Lost division finals (CHA)
2011–12	Norfolk Admirals	113	Won Calder Cup
2012–13	Providence Bruins	105	Lost Conference Semifinals (WBS)
2013–14	Texas Stars	106	Won Calder Cup
2014–15	Manchester Monarchs	109	Won Calder Cup
2015–16 (Note: Trophy winner based on points percentage due to uneven game schedules within league.)	Toronto Marlies	.750 (114 points)	Lost Conference Finals (HER)
2016–17	Wilkes-Barre/Scranton Penguins	.704 (107 points)	Lost Division Semifinals (PRO)
2017–18	Toronto Marlies	.737 (112 points)	Won Calder Cup
2018–19	Charlotte Checkers	.724 (110 points)	Won Calder Cup
2019–20	Milwaukee Admirals	.714 (90 points)	No playoffs (Note: The 2019–20 season ended in March because of the COVID-19 pandemic; Milwaukee had accrued 90 points in 63 games at the time the season was suspended, and de facto league champions.)
2020–21	Hershey Bears	.758 (50 points)	No playoffs (Note: Due to the COVID-19 pandemic, the season was delayed, shortened, and teams in Canada could not cross the border; no Calder Cup playoffs were held. Hershey's .758 was deemed league champions.)
2021–22	Chicago Wolves	.724 (110 Points)	Won Calder Cup
2022–23	Calgary Wranglers	106	Lost Division Finals (CV)
2023–24	Hershey Bears	111	Won Calder Cup
2024–25	Laval Rocket	101	Lost Conference finals (CLT)
2025–26	Providence Bruins	110	Lost Division Semifinals (SPR)

== Before the trophy ==
The following is a list of teams finishing first overall in the American Hockey League standings by season, prior to the institution of the Macgregor Kilpatrick Trophy. From the 1952–53 season until the 1960–61 season, as well as the 1976–77 season, the F. G. "Teddy" Oke Trophy was awarded to the team with the league leading record.

Season	Team	Points	Playoff Result
1936–37	Philadelphia Ramblers	60	Lost Calder Cup Final (SYR)
1937–38	Cleveland Barons	61	Lost division final (SYR)
1938–39	Philadelphia Ramblers	69	Lost Calder Cup Final (CLE)
1939–40	Providence Reds	62	Won Calder Cup
1940–41	Providence Reds	66	Lost division semi-final (CLE)
1941–42	Indianapolis Capitals	75	Won Calder Cup
1942–43	Hershey Bears	78	Lost division semi-final (BUF)
1943–44	Cleveland Barons	73	Lost Calder Cup Final (BUF)
1944–45	Cleveland Barons	78	Won Calder Cup
1945–46	Buffalo Bisons	84	Won Calder Cup
1946–47	Cleveland Barons	84	Lost division semi-final (HER)
1947–48	Cleveland Barons	98	Won Calder Cup
1948–49	Providence Reds	94	Won Calder Cup
1949–50	Cleveland Barons	100	Lost Calder Cup Final (IND)
1950–51	Cleveland Barons	93	Won Calder Cup
1951–52	Pittsburgh Hornets	95	Won Calder Cup
1952–53	Cleveland Barons	86	Won Calder Cup
1953–54	Buffalo Bisons	85	Lost League Semi-final (CLE)
1954–55	Pittsburgh Hornets	70	Won Calder Cup
1955–56	Providence Reds	92	Won Calder Cup
1956–57	Providence Reds	76	Lost League Semi-final (RCH)
1957–58	Hershey Bears	85	Won Calder Cup
1958–59	Buffalo Bisons	80	Lost Calder Final (HER)
1959–60	Springfield Indians	92	Won Calder Cup
1960–61	Springfield Indians	99	Won Calder Cup
1961–62	Springfield Indians	93	Won Calder Cup
1962–63	Buffalo Bisons	89	Won Calder Cup
1963–64	Quebec Aces	83	Lost Calder Cup Final (CLE)
1964–65	Rochester Americans	99	Won Calder Cup
1965–66	Quebec Aces	98	Lost division semi-final (RCH)
1966–67	Pittsburgh Hornets	92	Won Calder Cup
1967–68	Rochester Americans	85	Won Calder Cup
1968–69	Buffalo Bisons	97	Lost division semi-final (HER)
1969–70	Montreal Voyageurs	100	Lost division final (BUF & SPRK) (Note: 1969–70 Division Final was determined by a double round-robin that also involved the Buffalo Bisons and Springfield Kings)
1970–71	Baltimore Clippers	89	Lost division semi-final (PRO)
1971–72	Boston Braves	96	Lost division final (NSV)
1972–73	Cincinnati Swords	113	Won Calder Cup
1973–74	Rochester Americans	97	Lost division semi-final (NHN)
1974–75	Providence Reds	98	Lost division semi-final (SPR)
1975–76	Nova Scotia Voyageurs	104	Won Calder Cup
1976–77	Nova Scotia Voyageurs	110	Won Calder Cup
1977–78	Maine Mariners	95	Won Calder Cup
1978–79	Maine Mariners	103	Won Calder Cup
1979–80	New Haven Nighthawks	101	Lost division final (HER)
1980–81	Hershey Bears	103	Lost division final (ARW)
1981–82	New Brunswick Hawks	107	Won Calder Cup
1982–83	Rochester Americans	101	Won Calder Cup
1983–84	Baltimore Skipjacks	102	Lost division final (RCH)
1984–85	Binghamton Whalers	112	Lost division final (BAL)
1985–86	Hershey Bears	99	Lost Calder Cup Final (ARW)
1986–87	Sherbrooke Canadiens	102	Lost Calder Cup Final (RCH)
1987–88	Hershey Bears	105	Won Calder Cup
1988–89	Sherbrooke Canadiens	103	Lost division semi-final (NHN)
1989–90	Sherbrooke Canadiens	102	Lost division final (SPR)
1990–91	Rochester Americans	99	Lost Calder Cup Final (SPR)
1991–92	Fredericton Canadiens	96	Lost division semi-final (MON)
1992–93	Binghamton Rangers	124	Lost division final (RCH)
1993–94	St. John's Maple Leafs	102	Lost division final (MON)
1994–95	Albany River Rats	109	Won Calder Cup
1995–96	Albany River Rats	115	Lost division semi-final (COR)
1996–97	Philadelphia Phantoms	111	Lost division final (HER)
