= Harry Pidhirny =

Canadian ice hockey player

- Born: March 5, 1928 Toronto, Ontario, Canada
- Died: December 20, 2010 (aged 82) Springfield, Massachusetts, United States
- Height: 5 ft 11 in (180 cm)
- Weight: 155 lb (70 kg; 11 st 1 lb)
- Position: Centre
- Shot: Left
- Played for: Boston Bruins; Springfield Indians (AHL)
- Playing career: 1948–1968

Harry Pidhirny (March 5, 1928 – December 20, 2010) was a Canadian professional ice hockey player. Pidhirny played two games in the National Hockey League with the Boston Bruins during the 1957–58 NHL season, and was a top scorer in the minors, and juniors. In addition to the Bruins, Pidhirny also played for the Springfield Indians, Syracuse Warriors, San Francisco Seals, Providence Reds, Baltimore Clippers, and Muskegon Mohawks. He died in 2010.

== Career statistics ==
=== Regular season and playoffs ===
			Regular season					Playoffs
Season	Team	League	GP	G	A	Pts	PIM	GP	G	A	Pts	PIM
1944–45	Toronto Young Rangers	OHA	20	11	3	14	4	5	3	3	6	0
1945–46	Toronto Maher Jewels	TIHL	12	4	4	8	2	10	2	2	4	0
1945–46	Toronto Young Rangers	OHA	25	9	13	22	0	2	2	0	2	0
1946–47	Toronto Young Rangers	OHA	14	11	8	19	5	—	—	—	—	—
1947–48	Galt Rockets	OHA	36	22	26	48	23	8	11	8	19	5
1947–48	Toronto Maher Jewels	TIHL	—	—	—	—	—	4	2	2	4	4
1948–49	Philadelphia Rockets	AHL	68	19	20	39	13	—	—	—	—	—
1949–50	Springfield Indians	AHL	70	21	28	49	6	2	0	0	0	0
1950–51	Springfield Indians	AHL	64	30	28	58	8	1	0	0	0	0
1951–52	Syracuse Warriors	AHL	56	25	23	48	4	—	—	—	—	—
1952–53	Syracuse Warriors	AHL	63	34	30	64	2	4	2	1	3	0
1953–54	Syracuse Warriors	AHL	51	31	12	43	4	—	—	—	—	—
1954–55	Springfield Indians	AHL	64	23	27	50	14	4	2	0	2	0
1955–56	Springfield Indians	AHL	63	32	39	71	16	—	—	—	—	—
1956–57	Springfield Indians	AHL	60	23	28	51	8	—	—	—	—	—
1957–58	Boston Bruins	NHL	2	0	0	0	0	—	—	—	—	—
1957–58	Springfield Indians	AHL	68	20	28	48	6	13	0	4	4	0
1958–59	Springfield Indians	AHL	70	21	60	81	26	—	—	—	—	—
1959–60	Springfield Indians	AHL	69	31	36	67	10	10	5	6	11	0
1960–61	Springfield Indians	AHL	71	34	37	71	19	8	5	5	10	0
1961–62	San Francisco Seals	WHL	66	24	34	58	12	2	1	2	3	0
1962–63	Providence Reds	AHL	53	13	22	35	4	4	0	1	1	2
1963–64	Baltimore Clippers	AHL	62	20	20	40	4	—	—	—	—	—
1964–65	Baltimore Clippers	AHL	72	8	11	19	12	5	0	0	0	2
1965–66	Baltimore Clippers	AHL	47	1	4	5	6	—	—	—	—	—
1967–68	Muskegon Mohawks	IHL	36	15	23	38	4	9	5	2	7	0
1969–70	Barrie Flyers	OHA Sr	4	1	1	2	0	—	—	—	—	—
AHL totals			1071	386	453	839	162	51	14	17	31	4
NHL totals			2	0	0	0	0	—	—	—	—	—
