= Billy Gooden =

Canadian ice hockey player

- Born: September 8, 1923 Winnipeg, Manitoba, Canada
- Died: December 17, 1998 (aged 75)
- Height: 5 ft 9 in (175 cm)
- Weight: 175 lb (79 kg; 12 st 7 lb)
- Position: Left wing
- Shot: Left
- Played for: New York Rangers
- Playing career: 1942–1957

William Francis Charles "Bill" Gooden (September 8, 1923 – December 17, 1998) was a Canadian ice hockey left winger. He played 53 games in the National Hockey League with the New York Rangers during the 1942–43 and 1943–44 seasons. The rest of his career, which lasted from 1942 to 1957, was mainly spent in the American Hockey League, where he scored 20 goals in a season seven times.

== Career statistics ==
=== Regular season and playoffs ===
			Regular season					Playoffs
Season	Team	League	GP	G	A	Pts	PIM	GP	G	A	Pts	PIM
1940–41	Winnipeg Maroons	MJHL	7	8	2	10	6	3	4	0	4	2
1941–42	Portage Terriers	MJHL	18	15	22	37	25	5	7	4	11	15
1941–42	Portage Terriers	M-Cup	—	—	—	—	—	10	15	12	27	16
1942–43	New York Rangers	NHL	12	0	4	4	0	—	—	—	—	—
1942–43	Niagara Falls Catracts	OHA Sr	22	11	12	23	21	2	0	0	0	4
1943–44	New York Rangers	NHL	41	9	8	17	15	—	—	—	—	—
1944–45	Hershey Bears	AHL	59	27	41	68	12	11	4	5	9	11
1945–46	Hershey Bears	AHL	37	13	9	22	18	—	—	—	—	—
1945–46	New Haven Eagles	AHL	19	6	7	13	6	—	—	—	—	—
1946–47	Springfield Indians	AHL	62	17	22	39	40	2	0	0	0	5
1947–48	Springfield Indians	AHL	68	32	36	68	14	—	—	—	—	—
1948–49	Fort Worth Rangers	USHL	5	4	0	4	2	—	—	—	—	—
1948–49	Springfield Indians	AHL	60	34	32	66	24	3	3	1	4	2
1949–50	Springfield Indians	AHL	67	29	37	66	23	2	1	0	1	0
1950–51	Springfield Indians	AHL	63	32	37	69	28	1	0	1	1	0
1951–52	Syracuse Warriors	AHL	65	21	25	46	33	—	—	—	—	—
1952–53	Syracuse Warriors	AHL	60	21	28	49	21	4	0	0	0	2
1953–54	Syracuse Warriors	AHL	41	15	20	35	6	—	—	—	—	—
1954–55	Vancouver Canucks	WHL	15	0	4	4	0	—	—	—	—	—
1954–55	Providence Reds	AHL	20	3	8	11	6	—	—	—	—	—
1955–56	Trois-Rivières Lions	QSHL	38	13	17	30	8	—	—	—	—	—
1955–56	Providence Reds	AHL	6	1	0	1	2	—	—	—	—	—
1956–57	Clinton Comets	EHL	25	7	10	17	4	—	—	—	—	—
AHL totals			627	251	302	553	233	23	8	7	15	20
NHL totals			53	9	12	21	15	—	—	—	—	—

== Awards and achievements ==
- MJHL Championship (1942)
- Memorial Cup Championship (1942)
- AHL Second All-Star Team (1951)
- Honoured Member of the Manitoba Hockey Hall of Fame
