= Bruce Cline =

Canadian ice hockey player (1931–2025)

- Born: November 14, 1931; Massawippi, Quebec, Canada
- Died: April 24, 2025 (aged 93); Drummondville, Quebec, Canada
- Height: 5 ft 7 in (170 cm)
- Weight: 137 lb (62 kg; 9 st 11 lb)
- Position: Right wing
- Shot: Right
- Played for: New York Rangers
- Playing career: 1952–1968

Allan Bruce Cline (November 14, 1931 – April 24, 2025) was a Canadian professional ice hockey player who played as a right winger. He logged 30 NHL games for the New York Rangers in the 1956–57 campaign, while the majority of his career, from 1952 to 1968, was spent in the AHL, where he helped his teams win the Calder Cup on four occasions.

In his first AHL season in 1955–56, Cline tallied 57 points and helped guide the Providence Reds to a league title. His standout play earned him the Dudley (Red) Garrett Memorial Award as the AHL's rookie of the year. After spending three seasons with Providence, he moved on to the Buffalo Bisons, where he helped the team reach the AHL finals.

Cline's next stop was with the Springfield Indians, where he contributed to three consecutive championship runs (1960–62) and earned First Team AHL All-Star honors in 1961, followed by a Second Team selection in 1963.

Cline wrapped up his AHL career with five seasons as a member of the Hershey Bears, retiring after 13 seasons with totals of 321 goals, 452 assists, and 773 points in 823 regular‑season games, along with 58 points in 89 playoff appearances.

Cline was recognized for his outstanding contributions to the sport of hockey when he was inducted into the AHL Hall of Fame in 2016. Years later, in 2023, his legacy was further cemented at the local level when he was named to the Hershey Bears Hockey Club Hall of Fame.

At the age of 93, Cline died on April 24, 2025, in Drummondville, Quebec.

== Career statistics ==
=== Regular season and playoffs ===
			Regular season					Playoffs
Season	Team	League	GP	G	A	Pts	PIM	GP	G	A	Pts	PIM
1950–51	Quebec Citadelles	QJHL	46	11	20	31	4	23	6	8	14	13
1951–52	Quebec Citadelles	QJHL	50	20	30	50	19	13	2	2	4	5
1951–52	Quebec Citadelles	M-Cup	—	—	—	—	—	10	4	6	10	8
1952–53	Valleyfield Braves	QSHL	59	15	9	24	10	4	1	2	3	0
1953–54	Valleyfield Braves	QSHL	71	17	24	41	34	4	0	1	1	0
1954–55	Valleyfield Braves	QSHL	62	13	42	55	2	11	7	11	18	28
1955–56	Providence Reds	AHL	64	27	30	57	18	9	3	3	6	9
1956–57	New York Rangers	NHL	30	2	3	5	10	—	—	—	—	—
1956–57	Providence Reds	AHL	36	14	21	35	13	5	2	1	3	2
1957–58	Providence Reds	AHL	70	19	40	59	27	5	0	7	7	4
1958–59	Buffalo Bisons	AHL	70	22	39	61	39	7	0	2	2	0
1959–60	Springfield Indians	AHL	70	25	50	75	9	10	5	5	10	0
1960–61	Springfield Indians	AHL	72	40	52	92	13	8	2	3	5	4
1961–62	Springfield Indians	AHL	70	38	40	78	21	11	5	2	7	6
1962–63	Springfield Indians	AHL	72	39	48	87	26	—	—	—	—	—
1963–64	Hershey Bears	AHL	64	26	20	46	6	6	0	3	3	2
1964–65	Hershey Bears	AHL	72	17	28	45	6	15	4	3	7	2
1965–66	Hershey Bears	AHL	53	19	26	45	2	3	0	1	1	0
1966–67	Hershey Bears	AHL	70	28	42	70	20	5	1	1	2	0
1967–68	Hershey Bears	AHL	40	7	16	23	17	5	2	3	5	2
AHL totals			823	321	452	773	217	89	24	34	58	31
NHL totals			30	2	3	5	10	—	—	—	—	—
