= Jim Anderson (ice hockey) =

Canadian ice hockey player and coach

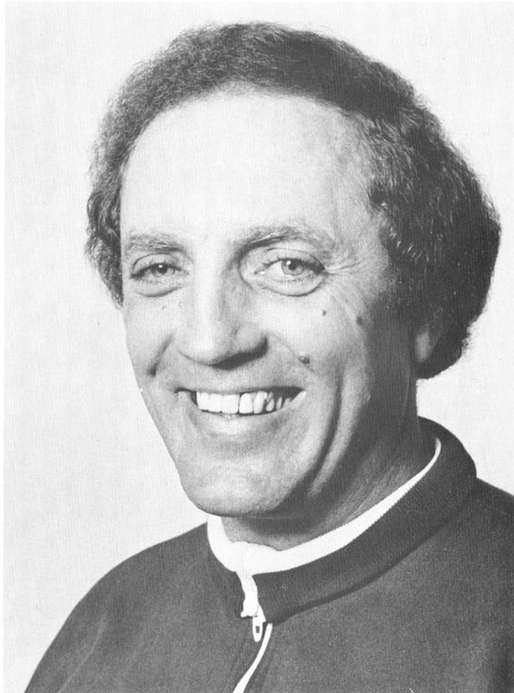
- Anderson in 1974 photo
- Born: December 1, 1930 Pembroke, Ontario, Canada
- Died: March 10, 2013 (aged 82) Sudbury, Ontario, Canada
- Height: 5 ft 10 in (178 cm)
- Weight: 165 lb (75 kg; 11 st 11 lb)
- Position: Left wing
- Shot: Left
- Played for: Los Angeles Kings
- Playing career: 1949–1970

James William Anderson (December 1, 1930 – March 10, 2013) was a Canadian professional ice hockey player and head coach. Anderson played 7 games with the Los Angeles Kings of the National Hockey League (NHL), and was the first head coach of the Washington Capitals. He was born in Pembroke, Ontario.

== Playing career ==
Jim Anderson spent the majority of his 16-year minor league career with the Springfield Indians franchise of the AHL, and remains the all-time leader in games played, goals and points for the franchise. In his first season with Springfield, Anderson scored 39 goals and was awarded the Dudley "Red" Garrett Memorial Award as AHL rookie of the year in 1954–55. In the early 1960s, Anderson scored 35 or more goals for Springfield for five straight years, helping lead the team to three consecutive Calder Cup championships, to this day the only AHL franchise to win three straight. In 1960–61, Anderson was named an AHL Second Team All-Star, scoring 81 points (the most of his career) with a league-leading 43 goals. The 40 goals he scored in 1963–64 earned him the Willie Marshall Award as the AHL's leading goal scorer, and also led again to be named a Second Team All-Star.

In the 1967–68 season, the National Hockey League expanded to twelve teams, and the new Los Angeles Kings took over the Springfield franchise as their top minor league affiliate, rebranding them as the Springfield Kings. That season, Anderson finally made his first NHL appearance with the parent Kings, playing in 7 games, and scoring 1 goal and 2 assists.

Anderson's AHL career concluded with 426 goals and 821 points in 943 games, at the time in the top five all-time in each category in the AHL. As of the 2015 season, he remains 11th all-time in games played, fifth in goals scored and ninth in points scored.

== Coaching career ==
Anderson was twice Springfield's head coach (1969-70 and 1975-76), and was the first head coach in the history of the NHL's Washington Capitals. After being replaced mid-season by George Sullivan, Anderson became a professional scout for the Los Angeles Kings' organization for 19 years.

In November 2008, Anderson's career was recognized with induction into the fourth class (2009) of the AHL Hall of Fame. He continued to make his off-season home in the Springfield area, and after retirement was a local skating instructor until shortly before his death.

== Career statistics ==
=== Regular season and playoffs ===
			Regular season					Playoffs
Season	Team	League	GP	G	A	Pts	PIM	GP	G	A	Pts	PIM
1949–50	Windsor Spitfires	OHA	3	0	0	0	0	9	1	4	5	0
1949–50	Detroit Hettche	IHL	31	18	14	32	12	—	—	—	—	—
1950–51	Windsor Spitfires	OHA	53	21	22	43	35	7	2	2	4	6
1951–52	Glace Bay Miners	MMHL	88	51	33	84	14	4	3	0	3	2
1952–53	Edmonton Flyers	WHL	44	11	11	22	8	15	12	3	15	0
1952–53	Shawinigan Falls Cataractes	QSHL	22	7	4	11	8	—	—	—	—	—
1953–54	Edmonton Flyers	WHL	66	23	21	44	22	13	6	2	8	2
1954–55	Springfield Indians	AHL	63	39	32	71	40	4	0	0	0	0
1955–56	Springfield Indians	AHL	61	28	23	51	44	—	—	—	—	—
1956–57	Springfield Indians	AHL	64	30	25	55	32	—	—	—	—	—
1957–58	Trois-Rivières Lions	QSHL	34	14	18	32	2	—	—	—	—	—
1957–58	Springfield Indians	AHL	11	3	0	3	12	—	—	—	—	—
1957–58	Buffalo Bisons	AHL	14	1	4	5	4	—	—	—	—	—
1958–59	Springfield Indians	AHL	69	27	36	63	16	—	—	—	—	—
1959–60	Springfield Indians	AHL	56	16	21	37	10	4	1	0	1	0
1960–61	Springfield Indians	AHL	72	43	38	81	18	8	5	0	5	0
1961–62	Springfield Indians	AHL	70	38	41	79	24	11	7	1	8	2
1962–63	Springfield Indians	AHL	70	35	26	61	6	—	—	—	—	—
1963–64	Springfield Indians	AHL	72	40	32	72	14	—	—	—	—	—
1964–65	Springfield Indians	AHL	72	40	29	69	14	—	—	—	—	—
1965–66	Springfield Indians	AHL	69	27	20	47	12	6	1	1	2	0
1966–67	Springfield Indians	AHL	63	25	29	54	4	—	—	—	—	—
1967–68	Los Angeles Kings	NHL	7	1	2	3		—	—	—	—	—
1967–68	Springfield Kings	AHL	62	22	24	46	26	4	0	1	1	2
1968–69	Springfield Kings	AHL	54	12	15	27	10	—	—	—	—	—
1969–70	Springfield Kings	AHL	1	0	0	0	0	—	—	—	—	—
AHL totals			943	426	395	821	286	37	14	3	17	4
NHL totals			7	1	2	3	2	—	—	—	—	—

== Coaching record ==
Team	Year	Regular Season						Post Season
Team	Year	G	W	L	T	Pts	Finish	Result
Washington Capitals	1974–75	54	4	45	5	9	5th in Norris	Fired

Preceded by Position created	Head coach of the Washington Capitals; 1974–75	Succeeded by George Sullivan
