= AHL Hall of Fame =

Online ice hockey museum

The AHL Hall of Fame is an online ice hockey museum dedicated to honoring members of the American Hockey League. Each year, a new class of inductees is enshrined during the AHL's All-Star Classic.

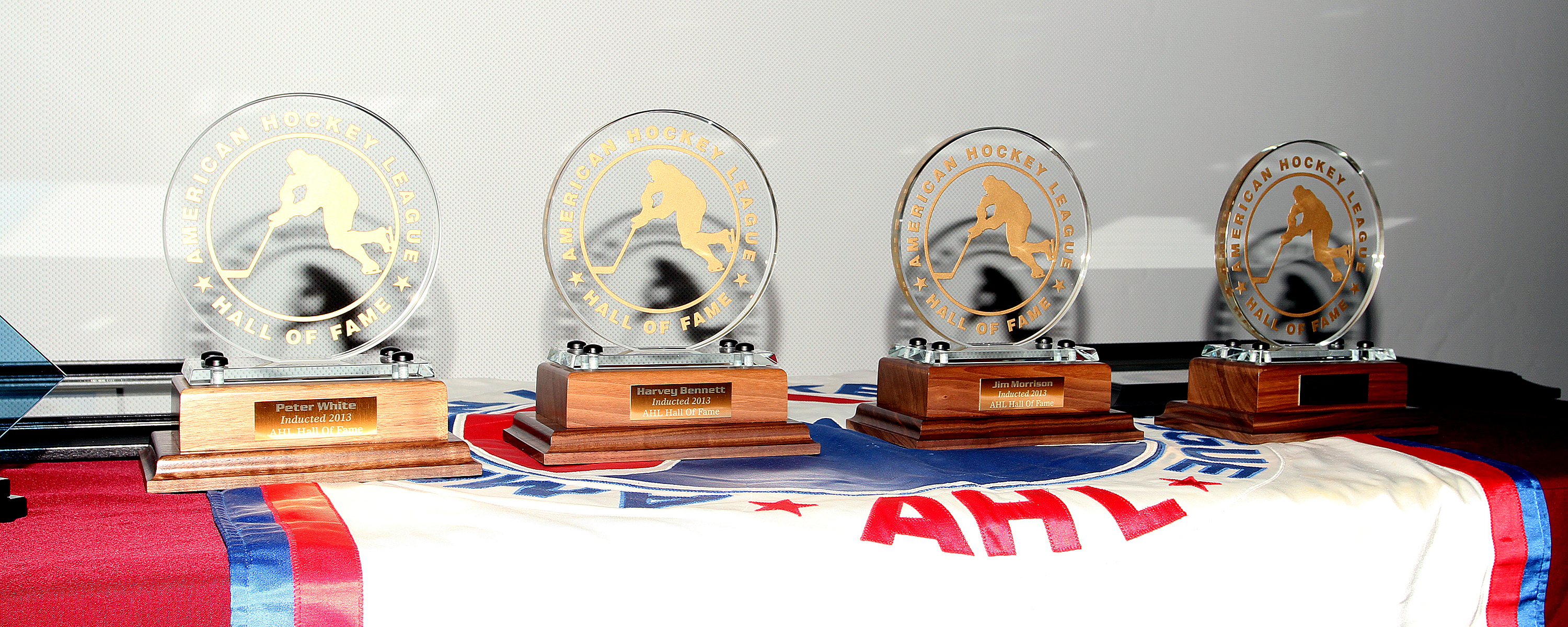
The 2013 AHL Hall Of Fame awards

On January 5, 2006, the league announced that Johnny Bower, Jack Butterfield, Jody Gage, Fred Glover, Willie Marshall, Frank Mathers and Eddie Shore had been selected as the inaugural class of inductees. They were formally inducted in a ceremony in Winnipeg, Manitoba, on February 1, 2006.

== Inductees ==
- 2006: Johnny Bower, Jack Butterfield, Jody Gage, Fred Glover, Willie Marshall, Frank Mathers, Eddie Shore
- 2007: Bun Cook, Dick Gamble, Gil Mayer, Mike Nykoluk
- 2008: Steve Kraftcheck, Noel Price, Tim Tookey
- 2009: Jim Anderson, Bruce Boudreau, Les Cunningham, Louis Pieri
- 2010: Macgregor Kilpatrick, John Paddock, Marcel Paille, Bill Sweeney
- 2011: Maurice Podoloff, Larry Wilson, Harry Pidhirny, Mitch Lamoureux
- 2012: Joe Crozier, Jack Gordon, John Stevens, Zellio Toppazzini
- 2013: Harvey Bennett Sr., Ken Gernander, Jim Morrison, Peter White.
- 2014: Bill Dineen, Al MacNeil, Bob Perreault, John Slaney.
- 2015: Frédéric Cassivi, James C. Hendy, Bronco Horvath, Art Stratton.
- 2016: Bruce Cline, Ralph Keller, Jean-Francois Labbe, Bruce Landon.
- 2017: Billy Dea, Bryan Helmer, Rob Murray, Doug Yingst.
- 2018: Jim Bartlett, Don Biggs, Brian Kilrea, Glenn Merkosky.
- 2019: John Anderson, Don Cherry, Murray Eaves, Brad Smyth.
- 2020: Robbie Ftorek, Denis Hamel, Darren Haydar, Fred Thurier.
- 2021: David Andrews.
- 2022: Keith Aucoin, Nolan Baumgartner, Dave Creighton, Bill Torrey
- 2023: None
- 2024: Dennis Bonvie, Gordie Clark, Gerry Ehman, Roy Sommer
- 2025: Rene Drolet, Dunc Fisher, Michael Leighton, Michel Picard
- 2026: Chris Bourque, Alexandre Giroux, Jim Wiemer, Wendell Young

== See also ==
- Hockey Hall of Fame
- ECHL Hall of Fame
