= Bill Sweeney (ice hockey) =

Canadian ice hockey player

- Born: January 30, 1937 Guelph, Ontario, Canada
- Died: March 21, 1991 (aged 54)
- Height: 5 ft 10 in (178 cm)
- Weight: 165 lb (75 kg; 11 st 11 lb)
- Position: Centre
- Shot: Left
- Played for: New York Rangers
- Playing career: 1957–1970

William Sweeney (January 30, 1937 – March 21, 1991), was a Canadian professional ice hockey player. He played 4 games in the National Hockey League with the New York Rangers during the 1959–60 season. The rest of his career, which lasted from 1957 to 1970, was mainly spent with the Springfield Indians of the American Hockey League (AHL), for whom he played nine seasons and is the all-time career leading scorer for the franchise.

== Playing career ==
Sweeney led the Ontario Hockey Association in scoring while playing for the Guelph Biltmores in 1956–57, and followed that up by winning the 1958 AHL rookie of the year award playing for the Providence Reds. Sweeney later won three consecutive Calder Cup championships with the Springfield Indians, also leading the league in scoring three consecutive seasons.

Sweeney's career was impacted by alcoholism and by the time league expansion opened up the NHL in 1967 to promising minor-league scorers, Sweeney's skills were in decline. He remained in the minors, and his rights were sold by Springfield to the Vancouver Canucks of the Western Hockey League early in the 1968 season; he played only 26 more professional hockey games in his career. His final professional action was in the following season with the Rochester Americans of the AHL, in which he played ten games without a point. Sweeney's final organized hockey match was in 1970 with the Ontario senior league Oakville Oaks.

== Career statistics ==
=== Regular season and playoffs ===
			Regular season					Playoffs
Season	Team	League	GP	G	A	Pts	PIM	GP	G	A	Pts	PIM
1953–54	Guelph Biltmores	OHA	14	4	3	7	0	3	0	1	1	2
1954–55	Guelph Biltmores	OHA	47	18	37	55	25	6	5	5	10	7
1955–56	Guelph Biltmores	OHA	48	29	38	67	16	3	0	1	1	2
1956–57	Guelph Biltmores	OHA	52	49	57	106	20	10	19	7	26	11
1956–57	Guelph Biltmores	M-Cup	—	—	—	—	—	6	2	3	5	0
1957–58	Providence Reds	AHL	70	31	46	77	24	5	1	1	2	2
1958–59	Buffalo Bisons	AHL	70	31	44	75	12	11	4	5	9	4
1959–60	New York Rangers	NHL	4	1	0	1	0	—	—	—	—	—
1959–60	Springfield Indians	AHL	67	37	59	96	14	10	7	7	14	0
1960–61	Springfield Indians	AHL	70	40	68	108	26	8	4	5	9	2
1961–62	Springfield Indians	AHL	70	40	61	101	14	11	5	5	10	0
1962–63	Springfield Indians	AHL	69	38	65	103	16	—	—	—	—	—
1963–64	Springfield Indians	AHL	72	25	48	73	18	—	—	—	—	—
1964–65	Springfield Indians	AHL	51	13	31	44	26	—	—	—	—	—
1965–66	Springfield Indians	AHL	72	22	37	59	10	6	2	3	5	0
1966–67	Springfield Indians	AHL	65	16	50	66	12	—	—	—	—	—
1967–68	Springfield Kings	AHL	9	1	1	2	0	—	—	—	—	—
1967–68	Vancouver Canucks	WHL	15	3	5	8	2	—	—	—	—	—
1967–68	Memphis South Stars	CPHL	1	0	0	0	0	—	—	—	—	—
1968–69	Rochester Americans	AHL	10	0	0	0	2	—	—	—	—	—
1969–70	Oakville Oaks	OHA Sr	11	2	10	12	0	—	—	—	—	—
AHL totals			695	294	510	804	174	51	23	26	49	8
NHL totals			4	1	0	1	0	—	—	—	—	—

== Awards ==
At the time of Sweeney's retirement, he was in the top ten in AHL history in goals (10th), assists (4th) and points (4th). He is, as of 2013, 11th in points, 22nd in goals and 9th in assists.

In the history of the Springfield Indians' franchise, Sweeney is third in goals behind Jim Anderson and Harry Pidhirny, second in points behind Anderson, and first in assists.

- 1956–57 - Eddie Powers Memorial Trophy
- 1957–58 - Dudley "Red" Garrett Memorial Award
- 1960–61 - John B. Sollenberger Trophy
- 1961–62 - John B. Sollenberger Trophy
- 1962–63 - John B. Sollenberger Trophy

Sweeney was also named to the AHL's First All-Star Team in 1960 and 1962, and to the Second All-Star Team in 1961.
