= Red Sullivan =

Canadian ice hockey player (1929–2019)

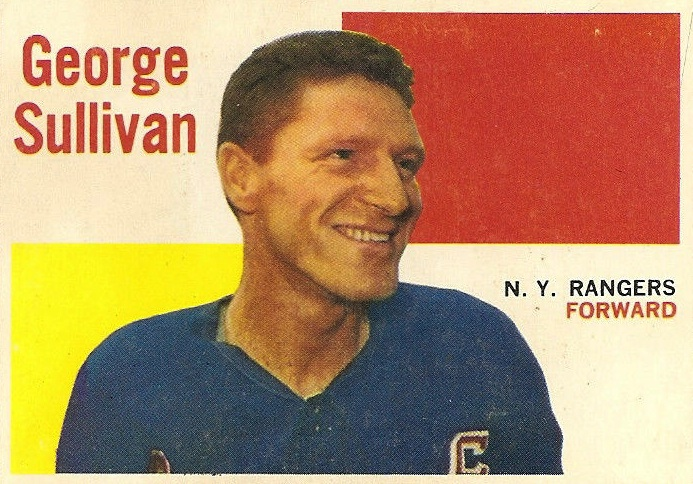
- Sullivan on a 1960 Topps card
- Born: December 24, 1929 Peterborough, Ontario, Canada
- Died: January 19, 2019 (aged 89) Peterborough, Ontario, Canada
- Height: 5 ft 11 in (180 cm)
- Weight: 160 lb (73 kg; 11 st 6 lb)
- Position: Centre
- Shot: Left
- Played for: Boston Bruins; Chicago Black Hawks; New York Rangers
- Playing career: 1949–1961

George James "Red" Sullivan (December 24, 1929 – January 19, 2019) was a Canadian professional ice hockey player who played in the National Hockey League (NHL) from 1949 to 1961. After finishing his playing career Sullivan became a coach, serving in that role between 1962 and 1975.

== Playing career ==
George "Red" Sullivan began his NHL career with the Boston Bruins (1949–1953). He also played for the Chicago Black Hawks (1954–1956) and the New York Rangers (1956–1961).

Sullivan led the Chicago Black Hawks in scoring for his two years in Chicago before being traded to the New York Rangers prior to the start of the 1956-57 season. Sullivan played in the NHL All-Star game five times (1955, 1956, 1958, 1959, 1960) and was named the New York Rangers captain for the 1957-58 season. He remained the Rangers captain through the 1960-61 season, his last as an NHL player.

Sullivan was severely injured, and very nearly killed, on November 26, 1956, when defenceman Doug Harvey of the Montreal Canadiens speared him in the stomach, rupturing his spleen, where a Catholic priest was even brought to the hospital to deliver his last rites, however Sullivan survived and resumed his career with the New York Rangers.

During 556 NHL games, he scored 107 goals with 239 assists for 346 points.

In the 2009 book 100 Ranger Greats, the authors ranked Sullivan at No. 66 all-time of the 901 New York Rangers who had played during the team's first 82 seasons.

== Coaching career ==
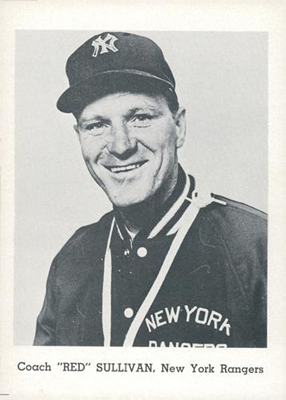
1964 photo of Sullivan as coach of the New York Rangers

Sullivan became the head coach of the Rangers during the 1962–63 season when fans began to demand Muzz Patrick resign. He coached a rather bad team until December 1965 when the Rangers' general manager, Emile Francis decided he himself would take over as head coach.

Sullivan then coached the Pittsburgh Penguins in their first season. He was dismissed on March 31, 1969 after two consecutive seasons of the Penguins failing to qualify for the playoffs due to a pair of fifth-place finishes.

During the 1974-1975 NHL season, Sullivan replaced Jim Anderson as head coach of the expansion Washington Capitals. Sullivan posted a 2-16 record as head coach and was replaced later that season by Milt Schmidt.

He died on January 19, 2019, after suffering for a number of years with Alzheimer's / dementia.

== Career statistics ==
=== Regular season and playoffs ===
			Regular season					Playoffs
Season	Team	League	GP	G	A	Pts	PIM	GP	G	A	Pts	PIM
1947–48	St. Catharines Teepees	OHA	26	10	12	22	34	3	2	3	5	0
1948–49	St. Catharines Teepees	OHA	46	32	48	80	53	5	6	4	10	6
1949–50	St. Catharines Teepees	OHA	13	14	15	29	19	—	—	—	—	—
1949–50	Boston Bruins	NHL	3	0	1	1	0	—	—	—	—	—
1949–50	Hershey Bears	AHL	51	10	30	40	36	—	—	—	—	—
1950–51	Hershey Bears	AHL	70	28	56	84	36	6	1	2	3	0
1950–51	Boston Bruins	NHL	—	—	—	—	—	2	0	0	0	2
1951–52	Boston Bruins	NHL	67	12	12	24	24	7	0	0	0	0
1952–53	Boston Bruins	NHL	32	3	8	11	8	3	0	0	0	0
1952–53	Hershey Bears	AHL	36	10	40	50	18	—	—	—	—	—
1953–54	Hershey Bears	AHL	69	30	89	119	54	11	2	7	9	4
1954–55	Chicago Black Hawks	NHL	70	19	42	61	51	—	—	—	—	—
1955–56	Chicago Black Hawks	NHL	63	14	26	40	58	—	—	—	—	—
1956–57	New York Rangers	NHL	42	6	17	23	36	5	1	2	3	4
1957–58	New York Rangers	NHL	70	11	35	46	61	1	0	0	0	0
1958–59	New York Rangers	NHL	70	21	42	63	56	—	—	—	—	—
1959–60	New York Rangers	NHL	70	12	25	37	81	—	—	—	—	—
1960–61	New York Rangers	NHL	70	9	31	40	66	—	—	—	—	—
1961–62	Kitchener-Waterloo Beavers	EPHL	61	16	46	62	81	7	1	6	7	4
1962–63	Baltimore Clippers	AHL	31	14	22	36	25	—	—	—	—	—
NHL totals			557	107	239	346	441	18	1	2	3	6

== Coaching record ==
Team	Year	Regular season						Postseason
Team	Year	G	W	L	T	Pts	Finish	Result
New York Rangers	1962–63	36	11	18	8	(56)	5th in NHL	Missed playoffs
New York Rangers	1963–64	70	22	38	10	54	5th in NHL	Missed playoffs
New York Rangers	1964–65	70	20	38	12	52	5th in NHL	Missed playoffs
New York Rangers	1965–66	20	5	10	5	(47)	6th in NHL	(fired)
Pittsburgh Penguins	1967–68	74	27	34	13	(67)	5th in West	Missed playoffs
Pittsburgh Penguins	1968–69	76	20	45	11	51	5th in West	Missed playoffs
Washington Capitals	1974–75	18	2	16	0	(21)	5th in Norris	(fired)
NHL Total		364	107	199	59			

Sporting positions
Preceded by Harry Howell	New York Rangers captain 1957–61	Succeeded by Andy Bathgate
Preceded by Muzz Patrick	Head coach of the New York Rangers; 1962–65	Succeeded by Emile Francis
Preceded by Position created	Head coach of the Pittsburgh Penguins; 1967–69	Succeeded by Red Kelly
Preceded by Jim Anderson	Head coach of the Washington Capitals; 1975	Succeeded by Milt Schmidt
