= Buffalo Bisons (AHL) =

- City: Buffalo, New York
- League: American Hockey League
- Operated: 1940–1970
- Home arena: Memorial Auditorium
- Colors: Red, white, blue
- Affiliates: Montreal Canadiens; Chicago Black Hawks; New York Rangers

Franchise history
- 1926–1930: Hamilton Tigers (CPHL, IHL)
- 1930–1940: Syracuse Stars (IHL, IAHL)
- 1940–1970: Buffalo Bisons

Championships
- Regular season titles: 5 (1945–46, 1953–54, 1958–59, 1962–63, 1968–69)
- Division titles: 8 (1942–43, 1944–45, 1945–46, 1949–50, 1950–51, 1962–63, 1968–69, 1969–70)
- Calder Cups: 5 (1942–43, 1943–44, 1945–46, 1962–63, 1969–70)

The Buffalo Bisons were an American Hockey League ice hockey franchise that played from 1940 to 1970 in Buffalo, New York. They replaced the original Buffalo Bisons hockey team, which left the area in 1936 after its arena collapsed. They were the second professional hockey team to play their games in the Buffalo city proper, after the short-lived Buffalo Majors of the early 1930s; the previous Bisons team had played across the border at an arena in Fort Erie, Ontario.

== History ==
The Bisons played at the newly constructed Memorial Auditorium, and at various times had affiliations with the Montreal Canadiens, Chicago Black Hawks and New York Rangers. The team was brought to Buffalo from Syracuse by Louis M. Jacobs, then owner of the Buffalo based Sportservice and the father of Jeremy Jacobs, the current owner of the Boston Bruins. In 1955, Jacobs sold the team to the Chicago Black Hawks owner Arthur Wirtz and used Buffalo as its top farm team. However, a struggle occurred and Chicago threatened to move the team out of Western New York. Local bottling owners in the Pastor Brothers bought the team.

The team's unusual logo stems from the Bisons being purchased in 1956 by the owner of the local franchise of Pepsi-Cola Ruby Pastor, who changed the team's colors and front sweater to reflect the soft drink company's "globe" logo; the Bisons retained the mark for the rest of their existence.

They were Calder Cup champions in 1943, 1944, 1946, 1963 and 1970, and runners-up in 1948, 1951, 1955, 1959 and 1962. After winning their first Calder Cup, the Bisons hired John Ducey to handle public relations, and manage the Memorial Auditorium.

The team ceased operations after the 1969–70 season due to the awarding of a National Hockey League expansion team, the Buffalo Sabres, to begin play in 1970–71. Like the Pittsburgh Hornets three years earlier (also shut down because of NHL expansion), the Bisons closed out their existence with one final championship.

Broadcaster Rick Jeanneret called several games during the Bisons' final season and moved into a similar role with the Sabres in 1971.

After the Bisons folded, the Sabres were granted an AHL franchise, which was used to establish the Cincinnati Swords in 1971. The Sabres used old Bisons jerseys in the team's first training camp in 1970. However the Swords is not a continuation of the Bisons as the team folded and the AHL granted Cincinnati a new team.

=== American Hockey League Hall of Famers ===
AHL Hall of Fame Honored Members
Name	Seasons	Induction Year
Jim Anderson	1957-58 (player)	2009
Bruce Cline	1958-59 (player)	2016
Dave Creighton	1961-62 (player)	2022
Billy Dea	1958-67 (player)	2017
Bill Dineen	1958-60 (player)	2014
Dick Gamble	1954-55, 1957-61 (player)	2007
Marcel Paille	1958-59 (player)	2010
Eddie Shore	1942-46 (general manager); 1943-44 (player)	2006
Art Stratton	1961-63, 1964-65 (player)	2015
Bill Sweeney	1958-59 (player)	2010
Fred Thurier	1942-44 (player)	2020
Larry Wilson	1955-68 (player)	2011

=== After the Bisons ===
On September 18, 2010, the Sabres announced that they would be adopting a third jersey that pays homage to the Bisons during their 2010–11 season. The Bisons-inspired third jersey was used for that and the following season before being discontinued. Elements from the Bisons-inspired throwbacks were incorporated into the Sabres' 2018 NHL Winter Classic jerseys. Those jerseys also became partly inspired by the Sabres new kits in 2020 along with elements used from the Sabres jerseys from 1970 to 1996.

== Season-by-season results ==
=== Regular season ===
AHL Season	Bisons Season	Games	Won	Lost	Tied	Points	Goals For	Goals Against	Standing
1940–41	1940-41	56	19	27	10	48	148	176	4th, West
1941–42		56	25	25	6	56	182	157	4th, West
1942–43		56	28	21	7	63	189	143	1st, West
1943–44		54	25	16	13	63	201	168	2nd, East
1944–45		60	31	8	21	70	200	182	1st, East
1945–46		62	38	16	8	84	270	196	1st, East
1946–47		64	36	17	11	83	257	173	2nd, West
1947–48		68	41	23	4	86	277	238	3rd, West
1948–49		68	33	27	8	74	246	213	5th, West
1949–50		70	32	29	9	73	226	208	1st, East
1950–51		70	40	26	4	84	309	284	1st, East
1951–52		68	28	36	4	60	230	298	3rd, East
1952–53		64	22	39	3	47	160	236	7th, AHL
1953–54		70	39	24	7	85	283	217	1st, AHL
1954–55		64	31	28	5	67	248	228	4th, AHL
1955–56		64	29	30	5	63	239	250	3rd, AHL
1956–57		64	25	37	2	52	209	270	5th, AHL
1957–58		70	25	42	3	53	224	301	6th, AHL
1958–59		70	38	28	4	80	233	201	1st, AHL
1959–60		72	33	35	4	70	251	271	5th, AHL
1960–61		72	35	34	3	73	259	261	4th, AHL
1961–62		70	36	31	3	75	247	219	2nd, West
1962–63		72	41	24	7	89	237	199	1st, West
1963–64		72	25	40	7	57	194	260	4th, West
1964–65		72	40	26	6	86	261	218	2nd, West
1965–66		72	29	40	3	61	215	243	4th, West
1966–67		72	14	51	7	35	207	386	4th, West
1967–68		72	32	28	12	76	239	224	3rd, West
1968–69		74	41	18	15	97	282	192	1st, West
1969–70		72	40	17	15	95	280	193	1st, West

=== Playoffs ===
Season	1st round	2nd round	Finals
1940–41	Out of playoffs		
1941–42	Out of playoffs		
1942–43	W, 4-2, Hershey	bye	W, 3-0, Indianapolis
1943–44	W, 4-1, Indianapolis	—	W, 4-0, Cleveland
1944–45	L, 2-4 Cleveland	—	—
1945–46	W, 4-1, Indianapolis	bye	W, 4-3, Cleveland
1946–47	W, 2-0, Springfield	L, 0-2, Pittsburgh	—
1947–48	W, 2-1, Hershey	W, 2-0, New Haven	L, 0-4, Cleveland
1948–49	Out of playoffs		
1949–50	L, 1-4, Cleveland	—	—
1950–51	L, 0-4, Cleveland	—	—
1951–52	L, 0-3, Cincinnati	—	—
1952–53	Out of playoffs		
1953–54	L, 0-3, Cleveland	—	—
1954–55	W, 3-1, Cleveland	—	L, 2-4, Pittsburgh
1955–56	L, 2-3, Providence	—	—
1956–57	Out of playoffs		
1957–58	Out of playoffs		
1958–59	W, 4-1, Rochester	—	L, 2-4, Hershey
1959–60	Out of playoffs		
1960–61	L, 1-3, Hershey	—	—
1961–62	W, 2-0, Rochester	W, 3-1, Hershey	L, 1-4, Springfield
1962–63	W, 4-2, Providence	bye	W, 4-3, Hershey
1963–64	Out of playoffs		
1964–65	W, 3-1, Pittsburgh	L, 2-3, Hershey	—
1965–66	Out of playoffs		
1966–67	Out of playoffs		
1967–68	L, 2-3, Quebec	—	—
1968–69	L, 2-4, Hershey	—	—
1969–70	W, 4-2, Quebec	1st in round-robin vs. Springfield & Montreal	W, 4-0, Springfield
