= Johnny Bower =

Canadian ice hockey player (1924–2017)

- Hockey Hall of Fame, 1976
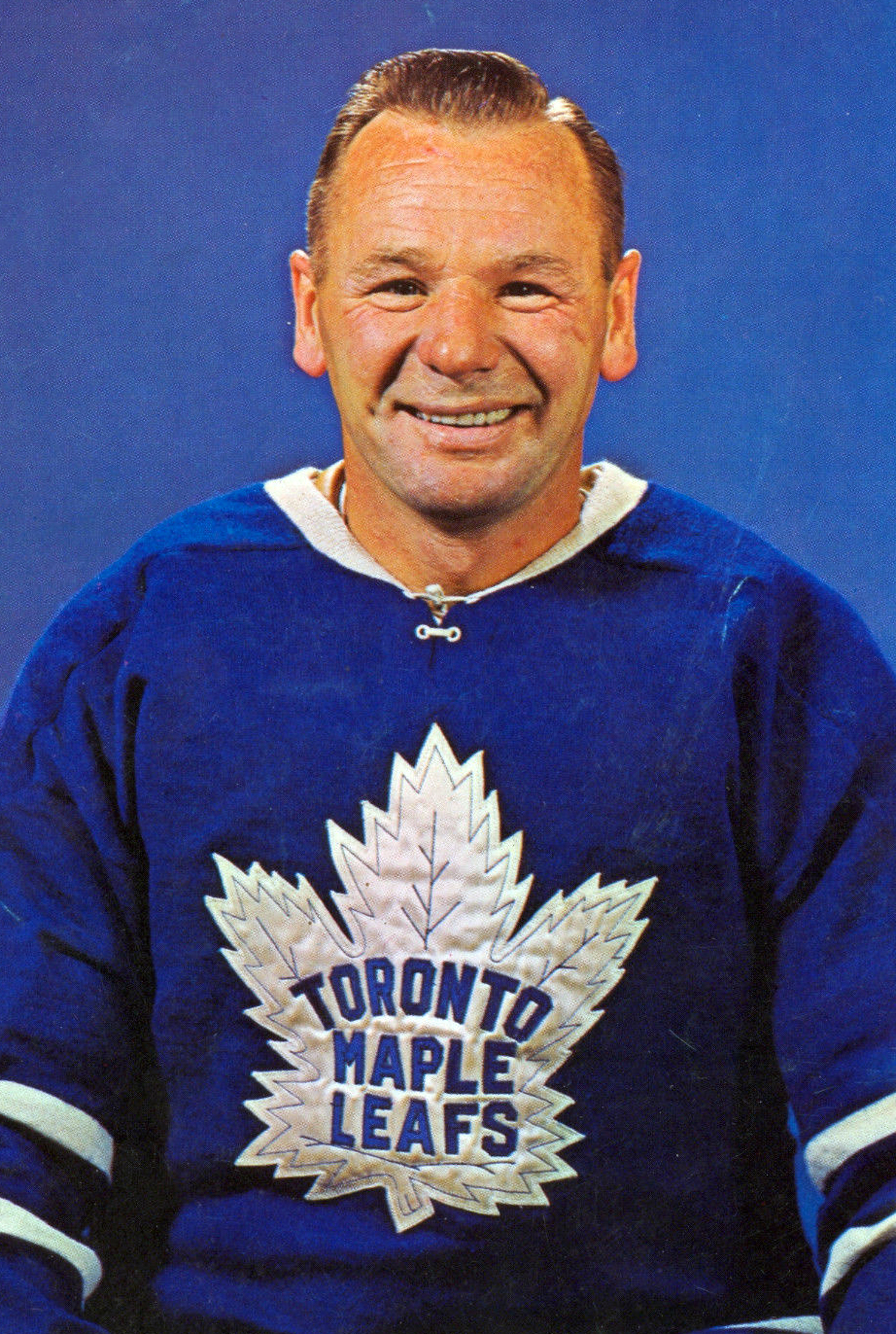
- Bower with the Toronto Maple Leafs, c. 1963
- Born: November 8, 1924 Prince Albert, Saskatchewan, Canada
- Died: December 26, 2017 (aged 93) Mississauga, Ontario, Canada
- Height: 5 ft 11 in (180 cm)
- Weight: 189 lb (86 kg; 13 st 7 lb)
- Position: Goaltender
- Caught: Left
- Played for: New York Rangers; Toronto Maple Leafs
- Playing career: 1945–1969
- Military career
- Allegiance: Canada
- Branch: Canadian Army
- Service years: 1940–1943
- Rank: Gunner
- Units: First Canadian Army; II Canadian Corps: 2nd Canadian Division
- Conflicts: World War II

John William Bower (né Kiszkan; Russian: Джон Уильям Кишкан; Ukrainian: Джон Вільям Кісцкан; November 8, 1924 – December 26, 2017) nicknamed "the China Wall", was a Ukrainian-Canadian ice hockey goaltender and inductee to the Hockey Hall of Fame, who won four Stanley Cups during his career with the Toronto Maple Leafs. In 2017 he was named one of the "100 Greatest NHL Players" in history. His song "Honky (The Christmas) Goose" reached #29 on the CHUM Charts in December 1965.

== Playing career ==
Bower was born John William Kiszkan into a Ukrainian-Canadian family in Prince Albert, Saskatchewan, to Johnny Kiszkan, a labourer born Dmytro Kiszkan, and his wife, Lizzie, née Jacobson. (His father had previously been a homesteader.) He had one brother and seven sisters. He taught himself how to play hockey, using a branch as a stick, and made himself goalie pads out of old mattresses. Around age 10, his parents separated. An uncommon practice at the time, it created a stigma around the family in their town. When he was 15, he lied about his age and enlisted in the Canadian Army during World War II; from 1940 to 1943 he was stationed in England as a gunner with the 2nd Canadian Division. He was discharged due to rheumatoid arthritis in his hands.

Kiszkan returned to Prince Albert in 1944 to play junior hockey there. In 1945, he turned professional in the American Hockey League (AHL), where he spent eleven seasons playing mostly for the Cleveland Barons in the late 1940s and 1950s.

Bower told various stories about his name change, including that "Bower" was his mother's maiden name, or that he was adopted. Biographer Dan Robson was also told that Barons management may have asked him to, to avoid the post-war discrimination against eastern Europeans, while other sources claim that it was because sports writers often misspelled "Kiszkan". His parents' break up may also have been a factor, suggests Robson, as Bower rarely talked about the situation. His surname was legally changed during his first year of professional hockey. Robson's 2018 book, Bower: A Legendary Life, dedicates a chapter to the topic.

In the AHL, he proved himself the star goaltender of the circuit, winning numerous awards and leading his teams to three Calder Cup championships.

Bower made his debut in the National Hockey League (NHL) with the New York Rangers in 1953–54, at the age of 29. The Rangers made him their starting goaltender over Gump Worsley, who had been rookie of the year the previous season. Bower played in all 70 games that season and recorded 29 wins. The following season Worsley won back the starting job for the Rangers, and Bower returned to the minor leagues. He played there for four more years with three teams, the Providence Reds, the Vancouver Canucks and the Cleveland Barons, and was called up briefly by the Rangers in 1954–55 and 1956–57.

In the 1958 Inter-League draft he was claimed by the Toronto Maple Leafs, who were an up-and-coming team of young star players at the time. Nonetheless, Bower preferred to stay with the Barons, as he was tired of moving all over the country. Punch Imlach, whom the Maple Leafs had recently hired, visited Bower and convinced him to give the NHL one more try, as he considered him "the most remarkable — and maybe the best — athlete in the world."

Bower won his first Vezina Trophy in 1961 for allowing the fewest goals in the 1960–61 season. The height of his NHL career came during the Maple Leafs' three consecutive Stanley Cup victories from 1962 to 1964. He later said, "When we won the Stanley Cup, my head went numb, my whole body went numb. That was my dream from Day One. You just can't explain the feelings inside you."

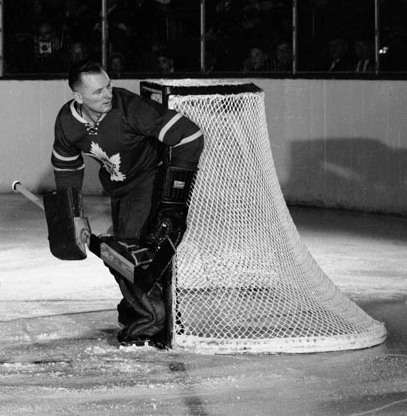
Johnny Bower in goal for the Toronto Maple Leafs

Bower's career was hampered by poor eyesight, but he remained a top-tier goaltender. He was known for his hard-nosed, scrappy playing style and helped the Leafs win another Stanley Cup in 1967, as part of a tandem with another Hall of Famer, Terry Sawchuk. He said, "I wasn't all that glad to see the two-goalie system come in. I wanted to play as many games as I could." Bower and Sawchuk shared the Vezina Trophy in 1964–65.

On April 6, 1969, at the age of 44 years, 4 months, and 29 days, Bower became the oldest goaltender to play in a Stanley Cup playoff game, a distinction previously held by Lester Patrick. He played his last game on December 10, 1969, a 6–3 loss to Montreal; mainly due to injuries, this was his only game of the 1969–70 season. At the time, he was the oldest full-time player to participate in an NHL game, and remains the second-oldest goaltender (45 years, 1 month, 2 days), behind only Maurice Roberts; he was surpassed as oldest full-time player by Gordie Howe, Chris Chelios, and Jaromír Jágr.

On March 19, 1970, Bower publicly announced his retirement, four months after his 45th birthday. He played eleven full seasons with the Leafs. When asked if he might reveal his true age, he replied "If you don't know by now, you never will". Coach Punch Imlach once told Bower, after seeing a purported birth certificate, "If you were born in this day here that you're telling me, you had to be overseas with the First Division, in 1939, when you were 13." Bower eventually revealed his birth date as November 8, 1924.

He remains the AHL career leader in wins with 359.

== Post-retirement and death ==
Bower worked for the Maple Leafs after his retirement in various capacities, including as a scout and a goalie coach. He was assistant coach for the Leafs from 1976 to 1978. He retired in 1990 but continued to make public appearances on behalf of the organization for the rest of his life.

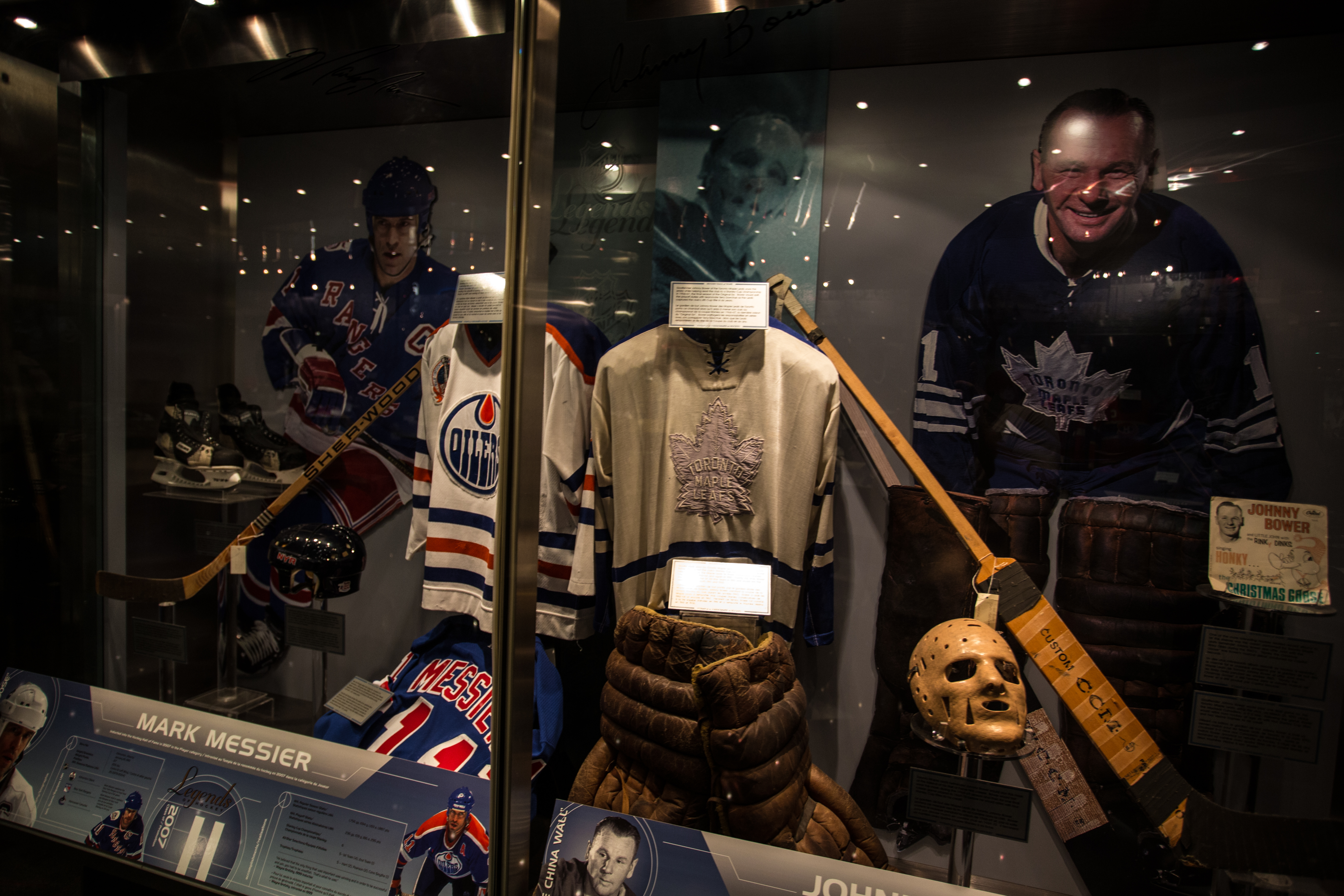
An exhibit for Bower at the Hockey Hall of Fame. Bower was inducted into the Hall in 1976.

Bower was elected to the Hockey Hall of Fame in 1976, and to the AHL Hall of Fame as a member of its inaugural class in 2006. In 1998, he was ranked number 87 on The Hockey News' list of the 100 Greatest NHL Players. He was inducted into the Etobicoke Sports Hall of Fame in 1994, and into the Ontario Sports Hall of Fame in 1999. He was married to Nancy and had a son, two daughters, eight grandchildren and six great-grandchildren, and resided in Mississauga, Ontario. After a city park near his house was renamed in his honour, he would routinely clean litter there, and feed the birds.

In January 2004, Bower was featured on a postage stamp. As part of the NHL All-Stars Collection, he was immortalized along with five other All-Stars. In 2005, the Royal Canadian Mint featured Bower on a non-circulating fifty-cent coin, as part of its four-coin Legends of the Toronto Maple Leafs coin set. In 2007, it was announced that Bower would receive a star on Canada's Walk of Fame.

On October 7, 2010, Bower opened the first game of the regular season for the Toronto Maple Leafs at Air Canada Centre by walking out on an implied "bridge over water" with his goalie stick.

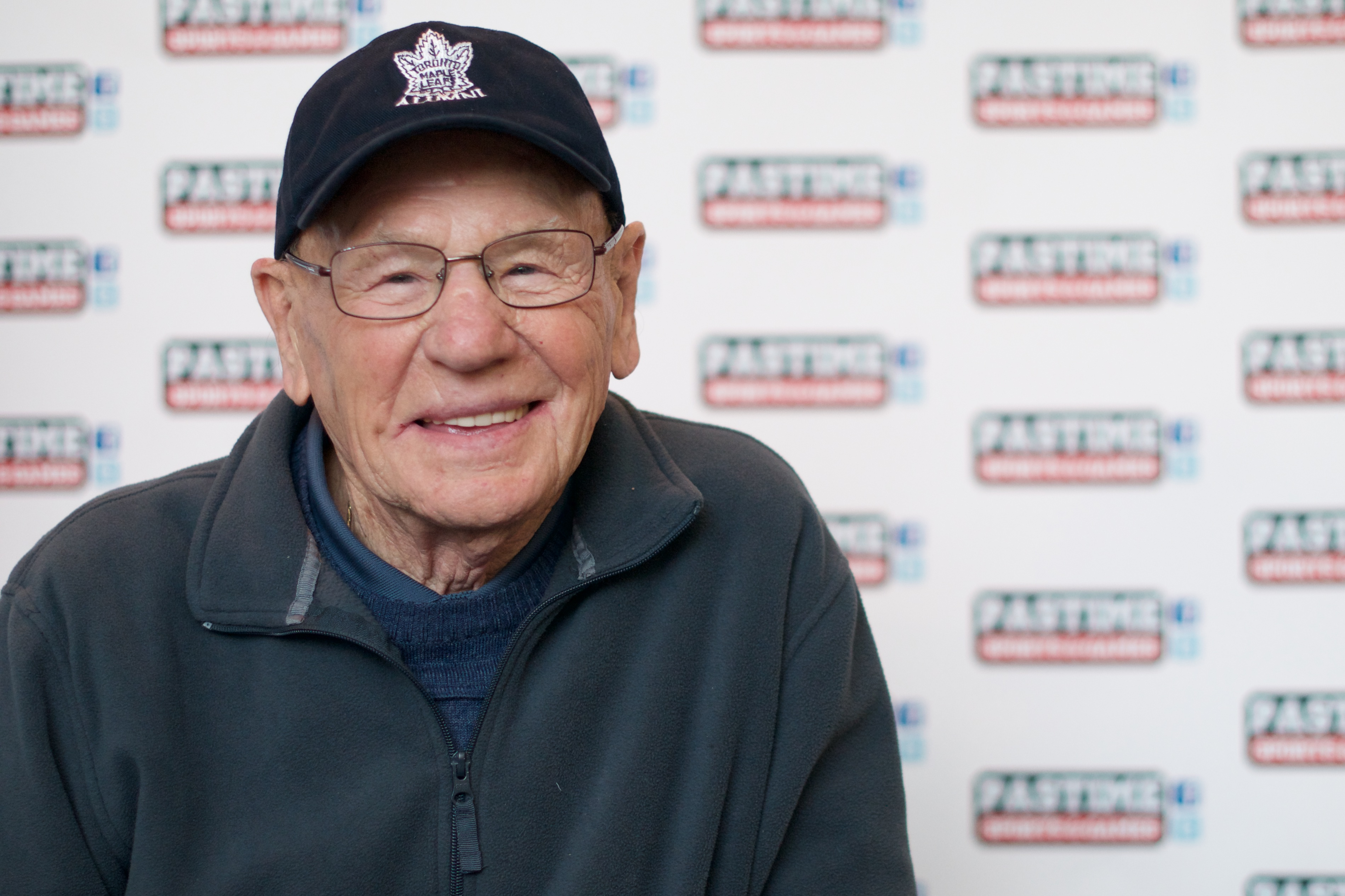
Bower attends an autograph signing in Surrey, B.C. in 2013

On May 24, 2014, Bower attended a street renaming ceremony in Weston in Toronto. Patika Avenue, where he lived during the 1960s, was renamed Johnny Bower Boulevard. He said, "It’s a great day for me and my family...this is a better ovation than I used to get at Maple Leaf Gardens."

On September 6, 2014, the Maple Leafs named him and Darryl Sittler two of the first three inductees of Legends Row (Ted Kennedy had been inducted some months earlier), with statues outside Air Canada Centre of twelve of the greatest players in Maple Leafs history.

On December 26, 2017, Bower died at the age of 93 from pneumonia. In the days following Bower's death, many teams, including the Maple Leafs, Winnipeg Jets, Arizona Coyotes and Toronto Raptors of the National Basketball Association honoured Bower with pre-game tributes. On January 3, the Maple Leafs hosted a public celebration of Bower's life at the Air Canada Centre. The event was attended by thousands, including various NHL alumni, members of the current Maple Leafs team, members of the Canadian Armed Forces and other major figures. The memorial was televised across several channels in Canada, and in accordance with the event, Toronto Mayor John Tory declared January 3 to be Johnny Bower Day in the city of Toronto. For the remainder of the 2017–18 season, the Maple Leafs wore patches on their jerseys and helmets in honour of Bower.

== Legacy ==
Bower was the first goaltender to employ the poke check, an aggressive move whereby the goalie uses his stick to poke the puck away from an attacking player, sometimes leaving his crease to do so. This move has since been imitated by goaltenders at all levels of hockey.

== Awards and honours ==
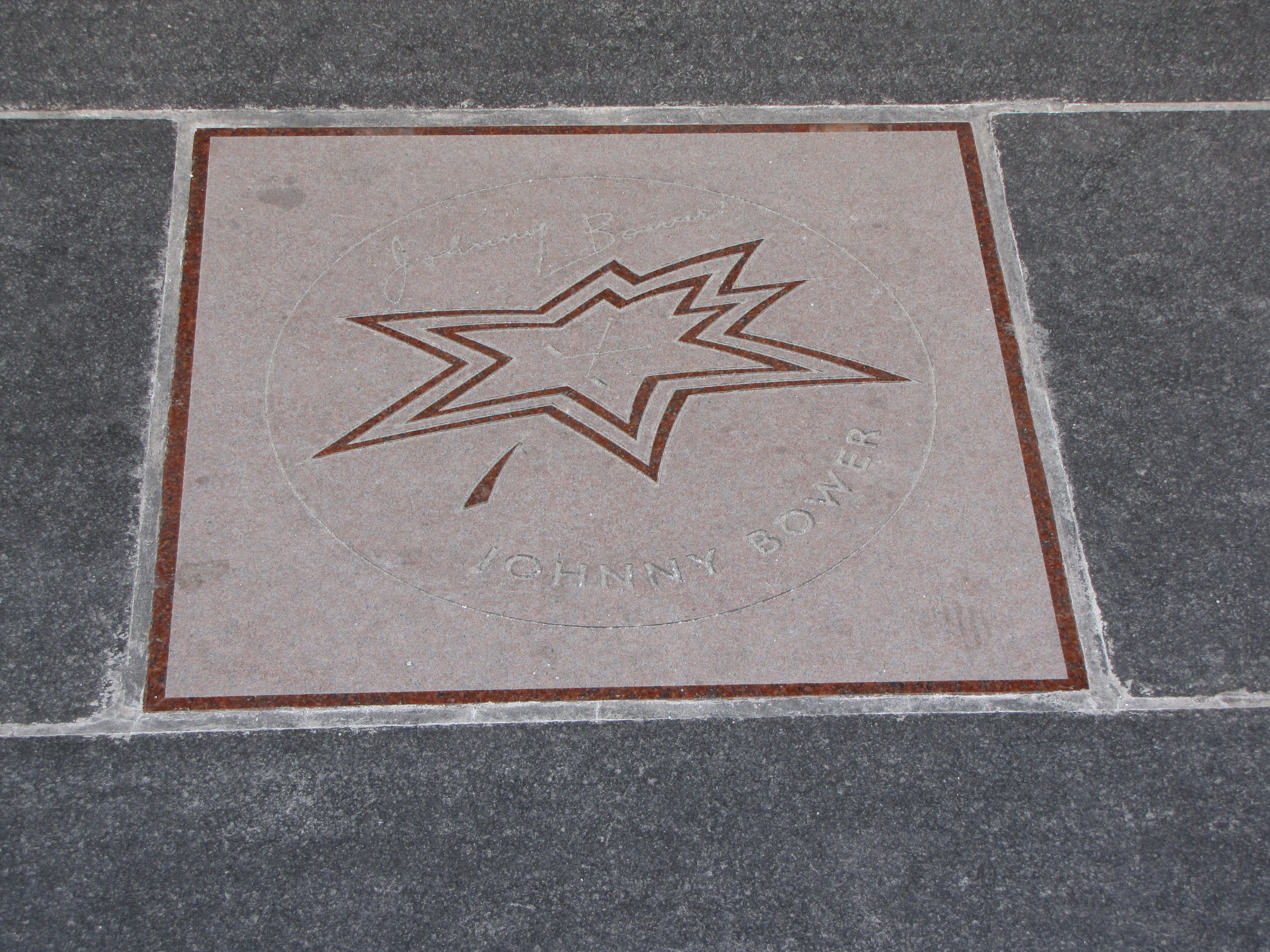
Bower's star on Canada's Walk of Fame.

- Three-time Hap Holmes Memorial Award: 1952, 1957, 1958
- Two-time Vezina Trophy winner in 1960–61, 1964–65
- Four-time Stanley Cup winner: 1961–62, 1962–63, 1963–64, 1966–67
- Selected to NHL first All-Star team in 1961
- Played in 1961 NHL All-Star Game
- Three-time Les Cunningham Award winner: 1956, 1957, 1958
- Three-time Calder Cup winner: 1948, 1951, 1953
- The Hockey News' list of the Top 100 NHL Players of All Time: #87
- Hockey Hall of Fame inductee (class of 1976)
- AHL Hall of Fame inductee (class of 2006)
- Star on Canada's Walk of Fame
- Number 1 retired by the Cleveland Monsters (for his career with the Cleveland Barons)
- Number 1 retired by the Toronto Maple Leafs (alongside Turk Broda)
- In January 2017, Bower was part of the first group of players to be named one of the '100 Greatest NHL Players' in history.

== Career statistics ==
=== Regular season and playoffs ===
Bold indicates led league

			Regular season									Playoffs
Season	Team	League	GP	W	L	T	MIN	GA	SO	GAA	SV%	GP	W	L	MIN	GA	SO	GAA	SV%
1944–45	Prince Albert Black Hawks	SJHL	10	5	4	1	630	27	0	2.57	—	—	—	—	—	—	—	—	—
1944–45	Laura Beavers	SIHA	—	—	—	—	—	—	—	—	—	1	0	0	60	3	0	3.00	—
1944–45	Prince Albert Black Hawks	M-Cup	—	—	—	—	—	—	—	—	—	3	0	3	180	23	0	7.67	—
1945–46	Cleveland Barons	AHL	41	18	17	6	2460	160	4	3.90	—	—	—	—	—	—	—	—	—
1945–46	Providence Reds	AHL	1	0	1	0	48	4	0	5.00	—	—	—	—	—	—	—	—	—
1946–47	Cleveland Barons	AHL	40	22	11	7	2400	124	3	3.10	—	—	—	—	—	—	—	—	—
1947–48	Cleveland Barons	AHL	31	18	6	6	1880	83	1	2.65	—	—	—	—	—	—	—	—	—
1948–49	Cleveland Barons	AHL	37	23	9	5	2200	127	3	3.43	—	5	2	3	329	23	0	4.19	—
1949–50	Cleveland Barons	AHL	61	38	15	8	3660	201	5	3.30	—	9	4	5	548	27	0	2.96	—
1950–51	Cleveland Barons	AHL	70	44	21	5	4280	213	5	2.99	—	11	8	3	703	32	0	2.73	—
1951–52	Cleveland Barons	AHL	68	44	19	5	4110	165	3	2.41	—	5	2	3	300	17	0	3.40	—
1952–53	Cleveland Barons	AHL	61	40	19	2	3680	155	6	2.53	—	11	7	4	745	21	4	1.69	—
1953–54	New York Rangers	NHL	**70**	29	31	10	**4200**	182	5	2.60	—	—	—	—	—	—	—	—	—
1954–55	Vancouver Canucks	WHL	63	30	25	8	3780	171	7	2.71	—	5	1	4	300	16	0	3.20	—
1954–55	New York Rangers	NHL	5	2	2	1	300	13	0	2.60	—	—	—	—	—	—	—	—	—
1955–56	Providence Reds	AHL	61	45	14	2	3710	174	3	2.81	—	9	7	2	540	23	0	2.56	—
1956–57	New York Rangers	NHL	2	0	2	0	120	6	0	3.50	.882	—	—	—	—	—	—	—	—
1956–57	Providence Reds	AHL	57	30	19	8	3501	138	4	2.37	—	5	1	4	300	15	0	3.00	—
1957–58	Cleveland Barons	AHL	64	37	23	3	3870	140	8	2.17	—	—	—	—	—	—	—	—	—
1958–59	Toronto Maple Leafs	NHL	39	15	17	7	2340	106	3	2.74	.913	**12**	5	**7**	**746**	**38**	0	3.06	.906
1959–60	Toronto Maple Leafs	NHL	66	34	24	8	3960	177	5	2.68	**.918**	**10**	4	**6**	**645**	**31**	0	2.88	.916
1960–61	Toronto Maple Leafs	NHL	58	**33**	15	10	3480	145	2	2.50	**.922**	3	0	3	180	8	0	2.67	.911
1961–62	Toronto Maple Leafs	NHL	59	31	18	10	3540	151	2	2.58	.918	10	**6**	3	579	20	0	**2.07**	**.927**
1962–63	Toronto Maple Leafs	NHL	42	20	15	7	2520	109	1	2.62	.913	10	8	2	600	16	**2**	**1.60**	**.949**
1963–64	Toronto Maple Leafs	NHL	51	24	16	11	3009	106	5	**2.11**	**.933**	**14**	**8**	**6**	850	30	**2**	**2.12**	**.930**
1964–65	Toronto Maple Leafs	NHL	34	13	13	8	2040	81	3	**2.38**	**.924**	5	2	3	321	13	0	2.43	.916
1965–66	Toronto Maple Leafs	NHL	35	18	10	5	1998	75	3	**2.25**	**.929**	2	0	2	120	8	0	4.00	.893
1966–67	Toronto Maple Leafs	NHL	27	12	9	3	1431	63	2	2.64	**.924**	4	2	0	183	5	**1**	1.64	.957
1967–68	Toronto Maple Leafs	NHL	43	14	18	7	2329	84	4	2.25	.934	—	—	—	—	—	—	—	—
1968–69	Toronto Maple Leafs	NHL	20	5	4	3	779	37	2	2.85	.910	4	0	2	154	11	0	4.29	.888
1969–70	Toronto Maple Leafs	NHL	1	0	1	0	60	5	0	5.00	.868	—	—	—	—	—	—	—	—
AHL totals			592	359	174	57	35,799	1684	45	2.82	—	55	31	24	3465	158	4	2.74	—
NHL totals			552	250	195	90	32,016	1340	37	2.51	.922	74	35	34	4378	180	5	2.47	.922

Preceded by Jacques Plante	Winner of the Vezina Trophy; 1961	Succeeded by Jacques Plante
Preceded by Charlie Hodge	Winner of the Vezina Trophy with Terry Sawchuk; 1965	Succeeded by Gump Worsley and Charlie Hodge
