= Springfield Indians =

American ice hockey franchise (1926–1994)

- City: Springfield, Massachusetts
- League: American Hockey League
- Operated: 1926–1994
- Home arena: Eastern States Coliseum (1926–1972, 1976-1980); Springfield Civic Center (1972–1976, 1980-1994)
- Colors: Blue, red, white
- Owner: Eddie Shore
- Affiliates: New York Americans, New York Rangers, Hartford Whalers, New York Islanders, Los Angeles Kings, Boston Bruins, Chicago Black Hawks, Minnesota North Stars

Franchise history
- First Can-Am Franchise
- 1926–1932: Springfield Indians
- Second Can-Am/AHL Franchise
- 1932–1935: Quebec Beavers
- 1935–1951: Springfield Indians
- 1951–1954: Syracuse Warriors
- 1954–1967: Springfield Indians
- 1967–1974: Springfield Kings
- 1974–1994: Springfield Indians
- 1994–2005: Worcester IceCats
- 2005–2013: Peoria Rivermen
- 2013–2021: Utica Comets
- 2021–present: Abbotsford Canucks

Championships
- Regular season titles: 3 1959–60, 1960–61, 1961–62
- Division titles: 6 1941–42 (East), 1959–60, 1960–61, 1961–62 (East), 1990–91 (North), 1991–92 (North)
- Calder Cups: 7 1959–60, 1960–61, 1961–62, 1970–71 (Kings), 1974–75, 1989–90, 1990–91

The Springfield Indians were two separate minor professional ice hockey franchises, originally based in West Springfield, Massachusetts and later Springfield, Massachusetts. The original Indians were founding members of the American Hockey League. Combined, they were in existence for a total of 60 seasons from 1926 to 1994, with three interruptions. The Indians had two brief hiatuses from 1933 to 1935, and from 1942 to 1946. The team was known as the Syracuse Warriors from 1951 to 1954; in addition, the team was named the Springfield Kings from 1967 to 1975. The Indians won seven Calder Cup championships; six as the Indians, three consecutive from 1960 to 1962, one in 1974, and two consecutive in 1990 and 1991; and one as the Kings, in 1971.

== Early history ==
The Indians had their start in the Canadian-American Hockey League in 1926. The "Can-Am", as it was called, was founded in Springfield and the Indians were one of the five initial franchises. The team was named after the Indian Motorcycle Company which was at the time, headquartered in Springfield. It was run at the time by Lester Patrick and the National Hockey League's New York Rangers, and future NHL stars such as Charlie Rayner, Earl Seibert (who after his playing days were through would be the Indians' longtime coach), Cecil Dillon and Ott Heller saw their start in Springfield uniforms. The Indians played in the Can-Am League until the 1932–33 season, having to fold thirteen games into the season. In 1935–36, Lucien Garneau transferred his Quebec Beavers franchise to Springfield, resurrecting the Indians name; the team was now associated with the NHL's Montreal Canadiens.

In 1939, Boston Bruins superstar defenseman Eddie Shore purchased the team. He split games between the Bruins and the Indians, even going so far as to provoke a trade to the New York Americans to make the train commute easier. He retired from the NHL after that season, but played for Springfield for two more seasons.

The Great Depression caused cutbacks all around, and the Can-Am merged with the International Hockey League to form the International-American Hockey League, which changed its name to the American Hockey League, having lost its last Canadian franchises, in 1941.

Despite early stars like Shore, Fred Thurier, Frank Beisler and Pete Kelly, success eluded the Indians on the ice. However, in the 1941–42 season, the Indians finished in first place.

Disaster struck for the team in the following season. With World War II, the United States army requisitioned the Eastern States Coliseum, Springfield's home arena, for the war effort, leaving the Indians without a home. Shore loaned Indians players to the Buffalo Bisons for the duration, returning the players to Springfield for the 1946–47 season. However, on ice success continued to elude the team, and despite the presence of stars such as Harry Pidhirny and Jim Anderson the franchise failed to have a winning record for another decade, including a temporary franchise relocation as the Syracuse Warriors from 1951 to 1954.

During those three seasons, Shore fielded a Springfield team in the low-minor Eastern Amateur Hockey League and later the Quebec Hockey League using the Indians name.Led by future Boston Bruins goaltender Don Simmons, scoring leader Vern Pachal, and player–coach Doug McMurdy, the EAHL Indians finished 3rd and 1st their two seasons in the loop, but finished in last place in 1954 in the QHL, the only team in the loop ever located outside of the province of Quebec.

Meanwhile, disappointed with attendance in Syracuse, Shore moved the AHL franchise back to Springfield – disbanding the QHL team – for good for the 1955 season. The team's few superlatives for the rest of the decade included the 1955 season – during which Ross Lowe won the only league MVP award in franchise history and Anderson was named rookie of the year – and All-Star Team citations to Eldie Kobussen at center in 1948, Billy Gooden in 1951, Lowe, Gordon Tottle and Don Simmons in 1955, Gerry Ehman and Cal Gardner in 1958, and Pidhirny in 1959.

== "They could have played in the NHL ... " ==
Owner Eddie Shore at the Eastern States Coliseum with the Springfield Indians' (still) record three consecutive (1959–60 through 1961–62) Calder Cup championship banners.

Matters turned around in the 1959–60 season. Behind an affiliation with the Rangers bringing stars Bill Sweeney and goaltender Marcel Paille over from Providence, and forwards Pidhirny, Anderson, Ken Schinkel, Bruce Cline, Brian Kilrea, and defensemen Ted Harris, Kent Douglas, Noel Price and Bob McCord, the Indians put together the most dominant run in AHL history. They finished with the best record in the AHL for three years in a row and won three straight Calder Cups, losing only five playoff games in that span. No AHL team before or since has finished with the league's best record for three years in a row or won three straight Calder Cups.

1959–60: Sweeney finished second in league scoring behind Fred Glover of Cleveland with 96 points, Floyd Smith finished third and Bruce Cline ninth. The Indians led the league with a 43–23–6 record, and defeated Rochester four games to one in the finals for the franchise's first Calder Cup. Sweeney was named to the First All-Star Team at center, Paille to the Second Team at goal, McCord to the Second Team at defense, Smith to the Second Team at left wing, and Parker MacDonald to the Second Team at right wing.

1960–61: Indians led the league with a 49–22–1 record, a mark unsurpassed until the 1973 season. The magnificent offense scored 344 goals, nearly a hundred more than any other team. Sweeney led the league in scoring, while Cline placed third, Kilrea fourth, Bill McCreary Sr. fifth and Anderson seventh in a show of offensive dominance unique in the history of the AHL, while Paille led the league in goaltending. The Indians became the second team in league history to go undefeated in the playoffs, sweeping the Cleveland Barons and the Hershey Bears. Paille was named to the First All-Star Team, as was Cline at right wing, McCord was awarded the Eddie Shore Award as the league's best defenseman, and Sweeney and Anderson were named to the Second Team.

1961–62: Indians led the league with a 45–22–3 record. Sweeney defended his scoring title, while Kilrea placed fourth and Anderson tenth, and Paille led the league in goaltending once more. Springfield defeated Buffalo four games to one in the finals to win its record third Calder Cup in a row. Douglas won best defenseman honors, Sweeney and Paille repeated as First Team All-Stars, and McCord and Smith were named to the Second Team again.

== The expansion era and beyond ==
Although it was not apparent at the time, the Indians created under Shore with their third straight Calder Cup. Sweeney led the league in scoring in 1963 for a third time, the party was over for the Indians. While they still had a winning record and an offense that led the league, the Rangers had moved Paille to Baltimore, and the team missed the playoffs that year in a tight divisional race. They continued to miss the playoffs for most of the rest of the Sixties.

In the meantime, Eddie Shore's oft-capricious and notoriously miserly ownership style caused increasing friction with his players, who staged wildcat strikes in 1966 and 1967. Representing them, a young lawyer named Alan Eagleson gained prominence, and went on to form the National Hockey League Players' Association (NHLPA).

In consequence, Shore sold his players and leased the franchise to the Los Angeles Kings of the NHL for the 1968 season, while retaining ownership of the team. The Kings renamed the franchise the Springfield Kings, and changed the team's colors from their traditional blue, white and red to a purple-and-gold scheme similar to the parent team. With Gord Labossiere, star defenseman Noel Price and goaltender Bruce Landon (a name that subsequently loomed large in Springfield hockey annals) the team had a winning record in the 1969 season, reaching the Cup finals before being swept by the Buffalo Bisons.

The following season the Kings had the benefit of a league lacking powerful teams. The league was so weak that Baltimore and Cleveland had winning records. The team just squeaked into the playoffs with a 29–35–8 record, winning a one-game playoff with the Quebec Aces to do it. However, they caught fire in the playoffs. Led by future NHL star center Butch Goring and Hockey Hall of Fame goaltender Billy Smith, the Kings steamrolled through the postseason with a sparkling 11–1 record. They upended Cleveland in the second round before sweeping the East champion Providence Reds squad in four close games to win their fourth Calder Cup. The 1971 Kings were, and remain, the team with the poorest regular season record ever to win the Calder Cup.

The following year Goring and Smith were gone, and the franchise spent two more years in the wilderness. Matters didn't improve even after the Kings moved to the brand-new Springfield Civic Center in 1972. But in the 1974–75 season, Shore enjoyed his final hurrah. Taking full control of the team once more, Shore changed its name midseason back to the Indians and reverted to the old blue-white-red palette, all to popular acclaim. With a cast of no-names and a record only three games over .500, the club won its fifth Calder Cup championship (becoming only the second fourth place team ever to do so), beating the New Haven Nighthawks four games to one in the finals. An elderly Shore sold the team after the next season, ending an era inextricably linking his name to Springfield hockey. With the sale the team moved back to The Big E Coliseum playing their games in their former home from the 1976–77 season through the 1979–80 season. Starting in October 1981 they returned to the Springfield Civic Center where they remained until they moved to Worcester as the Ice Cats in 1994.

Over the next 14 years, the Springfield Indians changed NHL affiliations frequently and hired a new coach every season. During this period, the team recorded two winning seasons, qualified for the playoffs four times, and won four postseason games. Individual performances during these years included a league scoring title by Bruce Boudreau in 1988, seasons by future NHL players Charlie Simmer and Mario Lessard in 1978, and a goalkeeping performance by Bob Janecyk, who led the league in 1983.

== The 1990s and the last cups ==
In 1990 fortunes changed once more, in an affiliation with the New York Islanders. A gallant squad coached by ex-NHL defensive whiz Jim Roberts sneaked into the playoffs in the final week in part due to veteran minor-league goaltender Rick Knickle's (signed when injuries both in Springfield and Long Island sidelined the Indians' top three goaltenders) eight game undefeated streak, and on May 18, 1990, the team knocked off the heavily favored Rochester Americans in six games in the finals for the franchise's sixth Calder Cup. Future NHL goaltender Jeff Hackett won the playoff MVP, inspirational leader Rod Dallman provided tons of grit, while names such as Marc Bergevin, Tom Fitzgerald, team captain Rob DiMaio, Jeff Finley and Bill Berg were heard from by NHL fans for many years to come.

In the middle of a dispute over leasing at the Springfield Civic Center, the Indians' home for much of the previous two decades, the team's affiliation changed again to the Hartford Whalers. The fans were very angry at the loss of their favorites, especially since their replacements came mostly from a Binghamton Whalers team recording the worst record in league history. However, the 1990–91 new look Indians proved their naysayers wrong. Behind Roberts' veteran coaching, they rampaged to the second best record in the league behind a powerful offense led by future NHLer Terry Yake, James Black, Chris Tancill and Michel Picard (who led the league with a franchise-record 56 goals), and a rock solid defense led by captain John Stevens and Bergevin, who had been acquired by the Whalers in an early-season trade. In so doing, the team won the North Division regular season title, the Indians' first division title since the Cup-winning squad of 1962. Goaltender Kay Whitmore won the playoff MVP as Springfield defended their title against Rochester. The victory would be the Springfield franchise's seventh and final Calder Cup championship.

== End of an era ==
Roberts and several stars were promoted to Hartford the following fall. The Indians won what would be their last division title in 1992 (and won their seventh straight playoff series in the preliminary round of the playoffs, setting a new league record). However, they would never reach the finals again. As it turned out, it would also be their last winning record. In 1993 the Indians made the conference finals before being devastated by the eventual champion Cape Breton Oilers. They made the playoffs again in 1994, but were eliminated in the first round by the Adirondack Red Wings.

The playoff loss would be the last game the Indians would play in Springfield. In the fall of 1994, the franchise was bought by out-of-town interests and moved to Worcester, Massachusetts, to become the Worcester IceCats. With good will from a league with central offices across the river in West Springfield and support from league president Jack Butterfield and vice-president Gordon Anziano (both former Indians executives), longtime Indians general manager Bruce Landon secured an expansion franchise that started play that season as the Springfield Falcons. He was also able to land an affiliation with the Whalers, thus allowing the new team to retain most of the Whalers-owned players that had played as the Indians in the previous season.

The Falcons moved to Tucson, Arizona in 2016 as the Tucson Roadrunners, but were replaced by the former Portland Pirates, who moved to Springfield as the Springfield Thunderbirds.A Springfield-based team has played in the AHL and its predecessors for all but seven years since 1926, and continuously since 1954. The only city with a longer unbroken run in the AHL is Hershey, where the Bears have played continuously since joining the AHL in 1938.

The original franchise moved to Peoria, Illinois, for the 2005–06 AHL season, where it played for eight years as the Peoria Rivermen. After the 2012–13 season, the Rivermen moved to Utica, New York as the Utica Comets, then to Abbotsford, British Columbia after the 2020–21 season becoming the Abbotsford Canucks. The Canucks are the second-oldest minor league hockey franchise in North America, behind only the Hartford Wolf Pack, heirs to another charter AHL member, the Providence Reds. Among all professional hockey franchises in North America, only the NHL's Original Six and the Wolf Pack are older than the Canucks.

The final Springfield Indian playing any significant time with the franchise active in the NHL was Rob DiMaio, who last played in the 2006 preseason with the Dallas Stars; the final Indians playing significant time with the franchise active in professional hockey were Michel Picard and Terry Yake, active respectively in the Ligue Nord-Américaine de Hockey and the Swiss Nationalliga B through the end of the 2009 season. The last player who ever wore an Indians jersey active in professional hockey was Robert Petrovicky, who played 46 games in Springfield, last active in 2016 with HK Dukla Trenčín of the Slovak Extraliga.

The market was subsequently home to the Springfield Falcons (1994–2016) and the Springfield Thunderbirds (2016–present).

== Hall of Famers ==
List of Springfield Indians alumni later inducted into the Hockey Hall of Fame.

- Keith Allen
- Jack Butterfield
- Lorne Chabot
- Art Coulter
- George "Punch" Imlach
- Brian Kilrea
- Chuck Rayner
- Earl Seibert
- Eddie Shore
- Billy Smith
- Clint Smith
- Lorne Worsley

List of Springfield Indians alumni later inducted into the AHL Hall of Fame.

- Jim Anderson
- Bruce Boudreau
- Jack Butterfield
- Don Cherry
- Gordie Clark
- Bruce Cline
- Gerry Ehman
- Bronco Horvath
- Brian Kilrea
- Bruce Landon
- Harry Pidhirny
- Marcel Paille
- Michel Picard
- Noel Price
- Eddie Shore
- John Stevens
- Bill Sweeney

== Notable NHL/WHA alumni ==
List of Springfield Indians alumni that played more than 100 games in Springfield, and also played at least a hundred games in the National Hockey League and/or World Hockey Association or were otherwise notable hockey executives. ‡ – denotes a member of the Hockey Hall of Fame.

- Keith Allen ‡
- Dave Amadio
- Blair Atcheynum
- Bryon Baltimore
- Bill Berg
- Marc Bergevin
- James Black
- Bruce Boudreau
- Jacques Caron
- Don Cherry
- Mike Corrigan
- Yvon Corriveau
- Roger Cote
- Gary Croteau
- Ian Cushenan
- Scott Daniels
- Gerald Diduck
- Cecil Dillon
- Rob DiMaio
- Kent Douglas
- Norm Dube
- Gerry Ehman
- Tommy Filmore
- Jeff Finley
- Tom Fitzgerald
- Gerry Foley
- Dan Frawley
- Irv Frew
- Brian Gibbons
- Leroy Goldsworthy
- Mark Greig
- Jeff Hackett
- Ted Harris
- Mark Heaslip
- Dale Henry
- Obs Heximer
- Ed Hoekstra
- Max Kaminsky
- Alan Kerr
- Brian Kilrea ‡
- Larry Johnston
- Pete Laframboise
- Joe Lamb
- Bruce Landon
- Ken Leiter
- Bob McCord
- Bill McCreary Sr.
- Howie Menard
- Bill Mikkelson
- Marcel Paille
- Michel Picard
- Barclay Plager
- Ron Plumb
- Poul Popiel
- Jean Potvin
- Noel Price
- Todd Richards
- Doug Robinson
- Dale Rolfe
- Ken Schinkel
- Tim Sheehy
- Eddie Shore ‡
- Charlie Simmer
- Don Simmons
- Brian Smith
- Floyd Smith
- Gord Smith
- Lorne Stamler
- John Stevens
- Fred Thurier
- Mike Tomlak
- Russ Walker
- Bill White
- Terry Yake

== Team records ==
- Goals in a season: Michel Picard, 56, 1990–91
- Assists in a season: Bruce Boudreau, 74, 1987–88
- Points in a season: Boudreau, 116, 1987–88
- Penalty minutes in a season: Mick Vukota, 372, 1987–88
- Shutouts in a season: Marcel Paille, 8, 1960–61
- Career games: Jim Anderson, 943
- Career goals: Anderson, 422
- Career assists: Brian Kilrea, 442
- Career points: Anderson, 813
- Career penalty minutes: Rod Dallman, 844

These are the top ten point-scorers in franchise history.

Note: Pos = Position; GP = Games played; G = Goals; A = Assists; Pts = Points

Player	Pos	GP	G	A	Pts
Jim Anderson	RW	918	422	391	813
Harry Pidhirny	RW	769	292	376	701
Bill Sweeney	C	545	232	420	652
Brian Kilrea	LW	590	169	442	611
Billy Gooden	C	486	201	237	438
Floyd Smith	RW	318	141	196	337
Bruce Cline	C	284	142	190	332
Dennis Olson	LW	432	126	181	307
Bill Summerhill	RW	254	114	156	270
Doug McMurdy	C	286	85	182	267

== Season-by-season results ==
- Springfield Indians 1926–1933 (Canadian-American Hockey League)
- Springfield Indians 1935–1936 (Canadian-American Hockey League)
- Springfield Indians 1936–1940 (International-American Hockey League)
- Springfield Indians 1940–1942
- Springfield Indians 1946–1951
- Syracuse Warriors 1951–1954 (shaded red)
- Springfield Indians 1954–1967
- Springfield Kings 1967–1974 (shaded gold)
- Springfield Indians 1974–1994

=== Regular season ===
First place finishes in bold.

Season	Games	Won	Lost	Tied	OTL	Points	Goals for	Goals against	Standing
1926–27	32	14	13	5	—	33	59	53	2nd, C-AHL
1927–28	40	24	13	3	—	51	90	71	**1st, C-AHL**
1928–29	40	13	14	13	—	39	60	58	4th, C-AHL
1929–30	39	14	23	2	—	30	96	120	5th, C-AHL
1930–31	40	29	9	2	—	60	167	99	**1st, C-AHL**
1931–32	40	10	25	5	—	25	85	136	6th, C-AHL
1932–33	13	6	5	2	—	14	29	29	6th, C-AHL
1935–36	48	21	22	5	—	47	131	129	3rd, C-AHL
1936–37	48	22	17	9	—	53	117	125	2nd, East
1937–38	48	10	30	8	—	28	96	140	4th, East
1938–39	54	16	29	9	—	41	121	179	3rd, East
1939–40	54	24	24	6	—	54	166	149	3rd, East
1940–41	56	26	21	9	—	61	157	149	3rd, East
1941–42	56	31	20	5	—	67	213	167	**1st, East**
1946–47	64	24	29	11	—	59	202	220	2nd, East
1947–48	68	19	42	7	—	45	237	308	5th, East
1948–49	68	22	37	9	—	53	240	276	3rd, East
1949–50	70	28	34	8	—	64	245	258	3rd, East
1950–51	70	27	37	6	—	60	268	254	3rd, East
1951–52	68	25	42	1	—	51	211	272	4th, East
1952–53	64	31	31	2	—	64	213	201	3rd, AHL
1953–54	70	24	42	4	—	52	215	317	6th, AHL
1954–55	64	32	29	3	—	67	251	233	3rd, AHL
1955–56	64	17	45	2	—	36	212	297	6th, AHL
1956–57	64	19	41	4	—	42	217	274	6th, AHL
1957–58	70	29	33	8	—	66	231	246	4th, AHL
1958–59	70	30	38	2	—	62	253	282	5th, AHL
1959–60	72	43	23	6	—	92	280	219	**1st, AHL**
1960–61	72	49	22	1	—	99	344	206	**1st, AHL**
1961–62	70	45	22	3	—	93	292	194	**1st, East**
1962–63	72	33	31	8	—	74	282	236	5th, East
1963–64	72	23	44	5	—	51	238	292	5th, East
1964–65	72	29	39	4	—	62	237	273	4th, East
1965–66	72	31	38	3	—	65	207	235	3rd, East
1966–67	72	32	31	9	—	73	267	261	4th, East
1967–68	72	31	33	8	—	70	247	276	2nd, East
1968–69	74	27	36	11	—	65	257	274	4th, East
1969–70	72	38	29	5	—	81	287	287	2nd, East
1970–71 ^{†}	72	29	35	8	—	66	244	281	3rd, East
1971–72	76	31	30	15	—	77	273	266	3rd, East
1972–73	76	18	42	16	—	52	265	344	5th, East
1973–74	76	21	40	15	—	57	251	327	6th, North
1974–75	75	33	30	12	—	78	299	256	4th, North
1975–76	76	33	39	4	—	70	267	321	4th, North
1976–77	80	28	51	1	—	57	302	390	5th, AHL
1977–78	81	39	33	9	—	87	348	350	3rd, North
1978–79	80	33	38	9	—	75	289	290	4th, North
1979–80	80	31	37	12	—	74	292	302	5th, North
1980–81	80	34	41	5	—	73	312	343	4th, North
1981–82	80	32	43	5	—	69	278	319	4th, North
1982–83	80	31	43	6	—	68	282	324	7th, South
1983–84	80	39	35	6	—	84	344	340	4th, South
1984–85	80	36	40	4	—	76	322	326	4th, South
1985–86	80	36	39	5	—	77	301	309	5th, South
1986–87	80	34	40	—	6	74	296	344	6th, South
1987–88	80	27	44	8	1	63	269	333	7th, North
1988–89	80	32	44	4	—	68	287	341	6th, North
1989–90	80	38	38	4	—	80	317	310	3rd, North
1990–91	80	42	27	10	—	96	348	281	**1st, North**
1991–92	80	43	29	8	—	94	308	277	**1st, North**
1992–93	80	25	41	14	—	64	282	336	4th, North
1993–94	80	29	38	13	—	71	309	327	4th, North

^{†}Defeated Quebec Aces 4–3 in a single tiebreaker game to determine final playoff position.

=== Playoffs ===
Playoff champions in bold.

Season	1st round	2nd round	3rd round	Finals
1926–27	??	—	—	**W, 9–5, New Haven**
1927–28	??	—	—	**W, 11–7, Quebec**
1928–29	Data unavailable.			
1929–30	Data unavailable.			
1930–31	??	—	—	**W, 3–2–2, Boston**
1931–32	Data unavailable.			
1932–33	Data unavailable.			
1935–36	Data unavailable.			
1936–37	Data unavailable.			
1937–38	Data unavailable.			
1938–39	Data unavailable.			
1939–40	Data unavailable.			
1940–41	L, 1–2, Pittsburgh	—	—	—
1941–42	L, 2–3, Indianapolis	—	—	—
1946–47	L, 0–2, Buffalo	—	—	—
1947–48	Out of playoffs.			
1948–49	L, 1–2, Cleveland	—	—	—
1949–50	L, 0–2, Providence	—	—	—
1950–51	L, 0–3, Pittsburgh	—	—	—
1951–52	Out of playoffs.			
1952–53	L, 1–3, Cleveland	—	—	—
1953–54	Out of playoffs.			
1954–55	L, 1–3, Pittsburgh	—	—	—
1955–56	Out of playoffs.			
1956–57	Out of playoffs.			
1957–58	W, 4–3, Cleveland	—	—	L, 2–4, Hershey
1958–59	Out of playoffs.			
1959–60	W, 4–1, Providence	—	—	**W, 4–1, Rochester**
1960–61	W, 4–0, Cleveland	—	—	**W, 4–0, Hershey**
1961–62	W, 4–2, Cleveland	bye	—	**W, 4–1, Buffalo**
1962–63	Out of playoffs.			
1963–64	Out of playoffs.			
1964–65	Out of playoffs.			
1965–66	W, 3–0, Hershey	L, 0–3, Cleveland	—	—
1966–67	Out of playoffs.			
1967–68	L, 1–3, Providence	—	—	—
1968–69	Out of playoffs.			
1969–70	W, 4–3, Hershey	2nd, R–R vs.BUF & MTL	—	L, 0–4, Buffalo
1970–71 ^{†}	W, 3–0, Montreal	W, 3–1, Cleveland	—	**W, 4–0, Providence**
1971–72	L, 1–4, Nova Scotia	—	—	—
1972–73	Out of playoffs.			
1973–74	Out of playoffs.			
1974–75	W, 4–2, Providence	W, 4–1, Rochester	—	**W, 4–1, New Haven**
1975–76	Out of playoffs.			
1976–77	Out of playoffs.			
1977–78	L, 1–3, Nova Scotia	—	—	—
1978–79	Out of playoffs.			
1979–80	Out of playoffs.			
1980–81	L, 3–4, Maine	—	—	—
1981–82	Out of playoffs.			
1982–83	Out of playoffs.			
1983–84	L, 0–4, Baltimore	—	—	—
1984–85	L, 0–4, Binghamton	—	—	—
1985–86	Out of playoffs.			
1986–87	Out of playoffs.			
1987–88	Out of playoffs.			
1988–89	Out of playoffs.			
1989–90	W, 4–2, Cape Breton	W, 4–2, Sherbrooke	—	**W, 4–2, Rochester**
1990–91	W, 4–3, Fredericton	W, 4–1, Moncton	—	**W, 4–2, Rochester**
1991–92	W, 4–3, Capital District	L, 0–4, Adirondack	—	—
1992–93	W, 4–2, Providence	W, 4–3, Adirondack	L, 0–2, Cape Breton	—
1993–94	L, 2–4, Adirondack	—	—	—

^{†}Defeated Quebec Aces 4–3 in a single tiebreaker game to determine final playoff position.
