= Rod Dallman =

Canadian ice hockey player

- Born: January 26, 1967 (age 59) Prince Albert, Saskatchewan, Canada
- Height: 5 ft 11 in (180 cm)
- Weight: 185 lb (84 kg; 13 st 3 lb)
- Position: Left wing
- Shot: Left
- Played for: New York Islanders; Philadelphia Flyers
- NHL draft: 118th overall, 1985; New York Islanders
- Playing career: 1987–1992

Rod Dallman (born January 26, 1967) is a Canadian former professional ice hockey left winger who played seven National Hockey League (NHL) games with the New York Islanders and Philadelphia Flyers.

== Playing career ==
A left winger and a known fighter, Dallman played junior hockey for the Prince Albert Raiders in the Western Hockey League. Along with future NHLers Dave Pasin, Dave Manson and Ken Baumgartner, the 1984–85 Raiders won the Memorial Cup championship.

Subsequently, Dallman was drafted in the 6th round of the 1985 NHL entry draft, 118th overall, and began his minor league career with the Springfield Indians of the American Hockey League in the 1988 season. His 355 penalty minutes that season was third in the AHL (his teammate, future notorious Islanders enforcer Mick Vukota, was second), even though he spent some time with the Peoria Rivermen of the IHL. He also made his NHL debut that season with the Islanders, playing in three games and scoring his only NHL goal.

The following season was spent almost exclusively in Springfield — Dallman played only a single game for the Islanders that year — where he had the second-most penalty minutes in the league. He was also part of an infamous incident where Ed Kastelic of the Binghamton Whalers was suspended for 20 games by the league for biting an official during an altercation with Dallman; Kastelic claimed that he thought he had been biting Dallman.

He played only one more game for the Islanders, in the 1990 playoffs, but was once again a champion, as the 1989–90 Indians won their sixth Calder Cup championship. Dallman served as an assistant captain on that team and had a sparkling five goals and five assists in fifteen games in the playoffs to be one of the Indians' inspirational leaders, although he had been battling injuries all season long. The Indians' Cup-winning victory in Game Six of the Calder Cup playoffs came on a power play goal in overtime, the result of Rochester Amerks forward Donald Audette receiving a match penalty for spearing Dallman in the face just before a faceoff.

The following season, Dallman signed with the Flyers, but played only briefly with farm teams in San Diego and Hershey while spending most of the season recuperating from his injuries of the previous year. He was healthy once more the following year, playing two games with the Flyers — his last NHL action — and 31 with the Hershey Bears before suffering a career ending knee injury, ironically in Springfield against the Indians.

== Retirement ==
Dallman retired with one goal, no assists and 26 penalty minutes in six NHL games, adding a single assist in his lone playoff game. In his minor league career, he played in 225 games, scoring 41 goals and 71 assists, and adding 1,061 penalty minutes. He is also the career leader in penalty minutes for the Indians franchise with 844. Vukota himself said that Dallman was the toughest player he had ever seen, and that his lack of size alone prevented him from becoming a feared enforcer in the NHL. Dallman is featured on numerous hockey fights websites and video compilations.

Following stints as an assistant coach and scout for the Prince Albert Raiders, Dallman is currently a correctional officer in Prince Albert and coaches youth hockey for the Saskatchewan Hockey Association.

His son Tyson was a centre for the West Kelowna Warriors of the British Columbia Hockey League, having played three seasons for the Tri-City Americans of the Western Hockey League. Like his father, he now coaches youth hockey.

== Career statistics ==
			Regular season					Playoffs
Season	Team	League	GP	G	A	Pts	PIM	GP	G	A	Pts	PIM
1983–84	Prince Albert Midget Raiders	SMHL	21	14	6	20	69	—	—	—	—	—
1984–85	Prince Albert Raiders	WHL	40	8	11	19	133	12	3	4	7	51
1985–86	Prince Albert Raiders	WHL	59	20	21	41	198	—	—	—	—	—
1986–87	Prince Albert Raiders	WHL	47	13	21	34	240	5	0	1	1	32
1987–88	New York Islanders	NHL	3	1	0	1	6	—	—	—	—	—
1987–88	Springfield Indians	AHL	59	9	17	26	355	—	—	—	—	—
1987–88	Peoria Rivermen	IHL	8	3	4	7	18	7	0	2	2	65
1988–89	New York Islanders	NHL	1	0	0	0	15	—	—	—	—	—
1988–89	Springfield Indians	AHL	67	12	12	24	360	—	—	—	—	—
1989–90	Springfield Indians	AHL	43	10	20	30	129	15	5	5	10	59
1989–90	New York Islanders	NHL	—	—	—	—	—	1	0	1	1	0
1990–91	Hershey Bears	AHL	2	0	0	0	0	—	—	—	—	—
1990–91	San Diego Gulls	IHL	15	3	5	8	85	—	—	—	—	—
1991–92	Philadelphia Flyers	NHL	2	0	0	0	5	—	—	—	—	—
1991–92	Hershey Bears	AHL	31	4	13	17	114	—	—	—	—	—
NHL totals			6	1	0	1	26	1	0	1	1	0
AHL totals			202	35	62	97	958	15	5	5	10	59
