= 1954–55 AHL season =

American Hockey League season

- League: American Hockey League
- Sport: Ice hockey

Regular season
- F. G. "Teddy" Oke Trophy: Pittsburgh Hornets
- Season MVP: Ross Lowe
- Top scorer: Eddie Olson

Playoffs
- Champions: Pittsburgh Hornets
- Runners-up: Buffalo Bisons

AHL seasons
- 1953–54 1955–56

The 1954–55 AHL season was the 19th season of the American Hockey League. Six teams played 64 games each in the schedule. The "Carl Liscombe Trophy" for the league's top scorer is renamed to the John B. Sollenberger Trophy. The All-Star game is revived, with the AHL All-Stars taking on the defending champions Calder Cup champions from the previous season. The Pittsburgh Hornets finished first overall in the regular season, and won their second Calder Cup championship.

== Team changes ==
- The Syracuse Warriors move back to West Springfield, Massachusetts, reverting to their old name, the Springfield Indians.

== Final standings ==
Note: GP = Games played; W = Wins; L = Losses; T = Ties; GF = Goals for; GA = Goals against; Pts = Points;

Overall	GP	W	L	T	Pts	GF	GA
Pittsburgh Hornets (TOR)	64	31	25	8	70	187	180
Cleveland Barons (independent)	64	32	29	3	67	254	222
Springfield Indians (independent)	64	32	29	3	67	251	233
Buffalo Bisons (CHI)	64	31	28	5	67	248	228
Hershey Bears (BOS)	64	29	28	7	65	217	225
Providence Reds (independent)	64	21	37	6	48	194	263

== Scoring leaders ==
Note: GP = Games played; G = Goals; A = Assists; Pts = Points; PIM = Penalty minutes

Player	Team	GP	G	A	Pts	PIM
Eddie Olson	Cleveland Barons	60	41	47	88	48
Ken Wharram	Buffalo Bisons	63	33	49	82	15
Ross Lowe	Springfield Indians	60	32	50	82	91
Fred Glover	Cleveland Barons	58	33	42	75	108
Walt Atanas	Springfield Indians	62	29	45	74	66
Paul Larivee	Providence Reds	62	29	45	74	19
Zellio Toppazzini	Providence Reds	62	21	53	74	12
Arnie Kullman	Hershey Bears	62	23	48	71	67
Jim Anderson	Springfield Indians	63	39	32	71	40
Ellard O'Brien	Hershey Bears	62	31	38	69	28

- complete list

== Calder Cup playoffs ==
First round

- Pittsburgh Hornets defeated Springfield Indians 3 games to 1.
- Buffalo Bisons defeated Cleveland Barons 3 games to 1.

Finals

- Pittsburgh Hornets defeated Buffalo Bisons 4 games to 2, to win the Calder Cup.
- list of scores

== All Star Classic ==
The second AHL All-Star game was played on October 27, 1954, after a 12-year hiatus. The defending Calder Cup champions Cleveland Barons lost 7–3 to the AHL All-Stars, in a game played at the Hershey Sports Arena, in Hershey, Pennsylvania.

== Trophy and Award winners ==
Team Awards

Calder Cup; Playoff champions:	Pittsburgh Hornets
F. G. "Teddy" Oke Trophy; Regular Season champions:	Pittsburgh Hornets

Individual Awards

Les Cunningham Award; Most valuable player:	Ross Lowe - Springfield Indians
John B. Sollenberger Trophy; Top point scorer:	Eddie Olson - Cleveland Barons
Dudley "Red" Garrett Memorial Award; Rookie of the year:	Jimmy Anderson - Springfield Indians
Harry "Hap" Holmes Memorial Award; Lowest goals against average:	Gil Mayer - Pittsburgh Hornets

== See also ==
- List of AHL seasons

Preceded by 1953–54 AHL season	AHL seasons	Succeeded by 1955–56 AHL season
