= Jack Butterfield (ice hockey) =

John Arlington Butterfield (August 1, 1919 – October 16, 2010) was a Canadian professional ice hockey administrator and the president of the American Hockey League, serving the longest tenure of any AHL executive (28 years, from 1966 to 1994). After his retirement as president, he served as the AHL's chairman of the board until his death and continued to oversee the creation of the annual regular-season schedules for the league. He was born in Regina, Saskatchewan.

== Career ==
After leaving the University of Alberta and being wounded in action while serving as a Wellington bomber pilot in the Royal Canadian Air Force in World War II, and before serving as a league official, Butterfield worked for his uncle Eddie Shore's New Haven Eagles and Springfield Indians teams as a public relations executive and trainer. He subsequently held management positions in the Pacific Coast Hockey League and the United States Hockey League before returning to the Indians, serving as a rink manager and trainer before rising to become the team's general manager. He was the general manager when the Indians won three consecutive Calder Cup championships in 1960, 1961 and 1962, a feat as yet unmatched in the AHL.

Upon becoming AHL President in 1966, Butterfield was instrumental in establishing the AHL as the primary minor league for the National Hockey League through restructuring of the basic affiliation agreement with the NHL. This agreement would help the league survive when expansion and the World Hockey Association came into being, and Butterfield's acumen became respected enough so that his views were sought by the NHL Rules Committee. He was responsible for moving the league offices to the Springfield area, where they remain to this day.

Butterfield guided the AHL through the 1970s, helping the league survive several rounds of NHL expansion and the appearance and disappearance of the WHA.

Elected to the Hockey Hall of Fame in 1980 in the Builders' category, Butterfield twice won the James C. Hendy Memorial Award as the AHL's outstanding executive (1971, 1984) and the NHL's Lester Patrick Trophy in 1985 for service to hockey in the United States. He was further honored by having the award for the most valuable player in the AHL playoffs named after him in 1984 and being named as one of the inaugural members of the AHL's Hall of Fame in 2006. Butterfield was also the first recipient of the Thomas Ebright Memorial Award in 1998 for outstanding contributions to the AHL.

"The American Hockey League would not exist today were it not for the efforts of Jack Butterfield during his tenure as president. He is a hockey legend and his contributions will forever be honored by the AHL," according to then-AHL President David Andrews, commenting after Butterfield's death.

Butterfield remained active in the community in retirement, serving on the board of the Springfield Shriner’s Hospital and as vice-chairman of the local March of Dimes. He died in Springfield, Massachusetts, on October 16, 2010.
