= 1960–61 AHL season =

- League: American Hockey League
- Sport: Ice hockey

Regular season
- F. G. "Teddy" Oke Trophy: Springfield Indians
- Season MVP: Phil Maloney
- Top scorer: Bill Sweeney

Playoffs
- Champions: Springfield Indians
- Runners-up: Hershey Bears

AHL seasons
- 1959–60 1961–62

The 1960–61 AHL season was the 25th season of the American Hockey League. Seven teams played 72 games each in the schedule. The All-Star Game was not played, and put on hold until resurrected in the 1994–95 AHL season. The Springfield Indians finished first overall again in the regular season, and won their second Calder Cup championship.

== Final standings ==
Note: GP = Games played; W = Wins; L = Losses; T = Ties; GF = Goals for; GA = Goals against; Pts = Points;

Overall	GP	W	L	T	Pts	GF	GA
Springfield Indians (NYR)	72	49	22	1	99	344	206
Hershey Bears (DET)	72	36	32	4	76	218	210
Cleveland Barons (MTL)	72	36	35	1	73	231	234
Buffalo Bisons (CHI)	72	35	34	3	73	259	261
Rochester Americans (TOR)	72	32	36	4	68	261	244
Quebec Aces (independent)	72	30	39	3	63	217	267
Providence Reds (BOS)	72	26	46	0	52	225	333

== Scoring leaders ==
Note: GP = Games played; G = Goals; A = Assists; Pts = Points; PIM = Penalty minutes

Player	Team	GP	G	A	Pts	PIM
Bill Sweeney	Springfield Indians	70	40	68	108	26
Phil Maloney	Buffalo Bisons	71	37	65	102	27
Bruce Cline	Springfield Indians	72	40	52	92	13
Brian Kilrea	Springfield Indians	70	20	67	87	47
Bill McCreary	Springfield Indians	72	33	54	87	26
Larry Wilson	Buffalo Bisons	72	30	54	84	62
Jim Anderson	Springfield Indians	72	43	38	81	18
Dick Gamble	Buffalo Bisons	72	40	36	76	18
Billy Dea	Buffalo Bisons	72	35	39	74	10
Hank Ciesla	Rochester Americans	70	30	44	74	23

- complete list

== Calder Cup playoffs ==
First round

- Springfield Indians defeated Cleveland Barons 4 games to 0.
- Hershey Bears defeated Buffalo Bisons 3 games to 1.

Finals

- Springfield Indians defeated Hershey Bears 4 games to 0, to win the Calder Cup.
- list of scores

== Trophy and award winners ==
Team awards

Calder Cup; Playoff champions:	Springfield Indians
F. G. "Teddy" Oke Trophy; Regular Season champions:	Springfield Indians

Individual awards

Les Cunningham Award; Most valuable player:	Phil Maloney - Buffalo Bisons
John B. Sollenberger Trophy; Top point scorer:	Bill Sweeney - Springfield Indians
Dudley "Red" Garrett Memorial Award; Rookie of the year:	Chico Maki - Buffalo Bisons
Eddie Shore Award; Defenceman of the year:	Bob McCord - Springfield Indians
Harry "Hap" Holmes Memorial Award; Lowest goals against average:	Marcel Paille - Springfield Indians

== See also ==
- List of AHL seasons

Preceded by 1959–60 AHL season	AHL seasons	Succeeded by 1961–62 AHL season
