= 1961–62 AHL season =

- League: American Hockey League
- Sport: Ice hockey

Regular season
- F. G. "Teddy" Oke Trophy: Springfield Indians
- Season MVP: Fred Glover
- Top scorer: Bill Sweeney

Playoffs
- Champions: Springfield Indians
- Runners-up: Buffalo Bisons

AHL seasons
- 1960–61 1962–63

The 1961–62 AHL season was the 26th season of the American Hockey League. The league initiates the James C. Hendy Memorial Award for outstanding team or league executives. The league resumes East and West Divisions. The John D. Chick Trophy is first awarded for the West Division champions of the regular season. The F. G. "Teddy" Oke Trophy is awarded to East Division champions of the regular season. Eight teams played 70 games each in the schedule. The Springfield Indians finished first overall again in the regular season, and won their third consecutive Calder Cup championship.

== Team changes ==
- The Pittsburgh Hornets resumed operations in the West Division after a five-year hiatus.

== Final standings ==
Note: GP = Games played; W = Wins; L = Losses; T = Ties; GF = Goals for; GA = Goals against; Pts = Points;

East	GP	W	L	T	Pts	GF	GA
Springfield Indians (NYR)	70	45	22	3	93	292	194
Hershey Bears (DET)	70	37	28	5	79	236	213
Providence Reds (BOS)	70	36	32	2	74	261	267
Quebec Aces (independent)	70	30	36	4	64	208	207

West	GP	W	L	T	Pts	GF	GA
Cleveland Barons (independent)	70	39	28	3	81	255	203
Buffalo Bisons (CHI)	70	36	31	3	75	247	219
Rochester Americans (TOR)	70	33	31	6	72	234	240
Pittsburgh Hornets (independent)	70	10	58	2	22	177	367

== Scoring leaders ==
Note: GP = Games played; G = Goals; A = Assists; Pts = Points; PIM = Penalty minutes

Player	Team	GP	G	A	Pts	PIM
Bill Sweeney	Springfield Indians	70	40	61	101	14
Willie Marshall	Hershey Bears	70	30	65	95	24
Barry Cullen	Buffalo Bisons	69	41	53	94	61
Brian Kilrea	Springfield Indians	70	20	73	93	28
Fred Glover	Cleveland Barons	70	40	45	85	148
Ron Attwell	Cleveland Barons	70	28	55	83	43
Stan Baluik	Providence Reds	69	25	56	81	55
Brian Cullen	Buffalo Bisons	67	22	59	81	18
Jim Mikol	Cleveland Barons	70	32	48	80	89
Jim Anderson	Springfield Indians	70	38	41	79	24

- complete list

== Calder Cup playoffs ==
First round

- Springfield Indians defeated Cleveland Barons 4 games to 2.
- Hershey Bears defeated Providence Reds 2 games to 1.
- Buffalo Bisons defeated Rochester Americans 2 games to 0.

Second round

- Springfield Indians earned second round bye.
- Buffalo Bisons defeated Hershey Bears 3 games to 1.

Finals

- Springfield Indians defeated Buffalo Bisons 4 games to 1, to win the Calder Cup.
- list of scores

== Trophy and award winners ==
Team awards

Calder Cup; Playoff champions:	Springfield Indians
F. G. "Teddy" Oke Trophy; Regular Season champions, East Division:	Springfield Indians
John D. Chick Trophy; Regular Season champions, West Division:	Cleveland Barons

Individual awards

Les Cunningham Award; Most valuable player:	Fred Glover - Cleveland Barons
John B. Sollenberger Trophy; Top point scorer:	Bill Sweeney - Springfield Indians
Dudley "Red" Garrett Memorial Award; Rookie of the year:	Les Binkley - Cleveland Barons
Eddie Shore Award; Defenceman of the year:	Kent Douglas - Springfield Indians
Harry "Hap" Holmes Memorial Award; Lowest goals against average:	Marcel Paille - Springfield Indians

Other awards

James C. Hendy Memorial Award; Most outstanding executive:	James G. Balmer

== See also ==
- List of AHL seasons

Preceded by 1960–61 AHL season	AHL seasons	Succeeded by 1962–63 AHL season
