= 1953–54 AHL season =

- League: American Hockey League
- Sport: Ice hockey

Regular season
- F. G. "Teddy" Oke Trophy: Buffalo Bisons
- Season MVP: Red Sullivan
- Top scorer: Red Sullivan

Playoffs
- Champions: Cleveland Barons
- Runners-up: Hershey Bears

AHL seasons
- 1952–53 1954–55

The 1953–54 AHL season was the 18th season of the American Hockey League. Six teams played 70 games each in the schedule. The Cleveland Barons won their seventh Calder Cup championship.

== Team changes ==
- The St. Louis Flyers cease operations.

== Final standings ==
Note: GP = Games played; W = Wins; L = Losses; T = Ties; GF = Goals for; GA = Goals against; Pts = Points;

| Overall | GP | W | L | T | Pts | GF | GA |
|---|---|---|---|---|---|---|---|
| Buffalo Bisons (MTL) | 70 | 39 | 24 | 7 | 85 | 283 | 217 |
| Hershey Bears (BOS) | 70 | 37 | 29 | 4 | 78 | 274 | 243 |
| Cleveland Barons (independent) | 70 | 38 | 32 | 0 | 76 | 269 | 227 |
| Pittsburgh Hornets (TOR) | 70 | 34 | 31 | 5 | 73 | 250 | 222 |
| Providence Reds (independent) | 70 | 26 | 40 | 4 | 56 | 211 | 276 |
| Syracuse Warriors (independent) | 70 | 24 | 42 | 4 | 52 | 215 | 317 |

== Scoring leaders ==
Note: GP = Games played; G = Goals; A = Assists; Pts = Points; PIM = Penalty minutes

| Player | Team | GP | G | A | Pts | PIM |
|---|---|---|---|---|---|---|
| George Sullivan | Hershey Bears | 69 | 30 | 89 | 119 | 54 |
| Jack Gordon | Cleveland Barons | 70 | 31 | 71 | 102 | 20 |
| Don Marshall | Buffalo Bisons | 70 | 39 | 57 | 96 | 8 |
| Gaye Stewart | Buffalo Bisons | 70 | 42 | 53 | 95 | 38 |
| Eddie Olson | Cleveland Barons | 70 | 40 | 54 | 94 | 50 |
| Lorne Ferguson | Hershey Bears | 70 | 45 | 42 | 87 | 34 |
| Danny Lewicki | Pittsburgh Hornets | 60 | 36 | 45 | 81 | 19 |
| Arnie Kullman | Hershey Bears | 69 | 40 | 41 | 81 | 35 |
| Dunc Fisher | Hershey Bears | 69 | 41 | 39 | 80 | 24 |
| Ed Slowinski | Buffalo Bisons | 67 | 38 | 41 | 79 | 16 |

- complete list

== Calder Cup playoffs ==
First round

- Cleveland Barons defeated Buffalo Bisons 3 games to 0.
- Hershey Bears defeated Pittsburgh Hornets 3 games to 2.

Finals

- Cleveland Barons defeated Hershey Bears 4 games to 2, to win the Calder Cup.
- list of scores

== Trophy and Award winners ==
Team Awards

| Calder Cup; Playoff champions: | Cleveland Barons |
| F. G. "Teddy" Oke Trophy; Regular Season champions: | Buffalo Bisons |

Individual Awards

| Les Cunningham Award; Most valuable player: | George Sullivan - Hershey Bears |
| Carl Liscombe Trophy; Top point scorer: | George Sullivan - Hershey Bears |
| Dudley "Red" Garrett Memorial Award; Rookie of the year: | Don Marshall - Buffalo Bisons |
| Harry "Hap" Holmes Memorial Award; Lowest goals against average: | Gil Mayer - Pittsburgh Hornets |

== See also ==
- List of AHL seasons

| Preceded by 1952–53 AHL season | AHL seasons | Succeeded by 1954–55 AHL season |
