= 1958–59 AHL season =

- League: American Hockey League
- Sport: Ice hockey

Regular season
- F. G. "Teddy" Oke Trophy: Buffalo Bisons
- Season MVP: Rudy Migay; Bill Hicke
- Top scorer: Fred Glover

Playoffs
- Champions: Hershey Bears
- Runners-up: Buffalo Bisons

AHL seasons
- 1957–58 1959–60

The 1958–59 AHL season was the 23rd season of the American Hockey League. The Eddie Shore Award was first awarded to the "Defenceman of the year". Six teams played 70 games each in the schedule. The Buffalo Bisons finished first overall in the regular season. The Hershey Bears won their second consecutive Calder Cup championship.

== Final standings ==
Note: GP = Games played; W = Wins; L = Losses; T = Ties; GF = Goals for; GA = Goals against; Pts = Points;

Overall	GP	W	L	T	Pts	GF	GA
Buffalo Bisons (CHI)	70	38	28	4	80	233	201
Cleveland Barons (independent)	70	37	30	3	77	261	252
Rochester Americans (MTL/TOR)	70	34	31	5	73	242	209
Hershey Bears (DET)	70	32	32	6	70	200	202
Springfield Indians (NYR)	70	30	38	2	62	253	282
Providence Reds (BOS)	70	28	40	2	58	222	265

== Scoring leaders ==
Note: GP = Games played; G = Goals; A = Assists; Pts = Points; PIM = Penalty minutes

Player	Team	GP	G	A	Pts	PIM
Bill Hicke	Rochester Americans	69	41	56	97	41
Ken Schinkel	Springfield Indians	70	43	42	85	19
Rudy Migay	Rochester Americans	51	24	58	82	100
Harry Pidhirny	Springfield Indians	70	21	60	81	26
Gary Aldcorn	Rochester Americans	66	37	42	79	52
Eddie Mazur	Cleveland Barons	70	34	44	78	54
Art Stratton	Cleveland Barons	62	29	47	76	40
Bill Sweeney	Buffalo Bisons	70	31	44	75	12

- complete list

== Calder Cup playoffs ==
First round

- Buffalo Bisons defeated Rochester Americans 4 games to 1.
- Hershey Bears defeated Cleveland Barons 4 games to 3.

Finals

- Hershey Bears defeated Buffalo Bisons 4 games to 2, to win the Calder Cup.
- list of scores

== All Star Classic ==
The 6th AHL All-Star Game was played on January 15, 1959, at the Hershey Sports Arena, in Hershey, Pennsylvania. The defending Calder Cup champions Hershey Bears won 5–2 versus the AHL All-Stars.

== Trophy and award winners ==
Team awards

Calder Cup; Playoff champions:	Hershey Bears
F. G. "Teddy" Oke Trophy; Regular Season champions:	Buffalo Bisons

Individual awards

Les Cunningham Award; Most valuable player:	Bill Hicke and Rudy Migay - Rochester Americans
John B. Sollenberger Trophy; Top point scorer:	Bill Hicke - Rochester Americans
Dudley "Red" Garrett Memorial Award; Rookie of the year:	Bill Hicke - Rochester Americans
Eddie Shore Award; Defenceman of the year:	Steve Kraftcheck - Rochester Americans
Harry "Hap" Holmes Memorial Award; Lowest goals against average:	Bobby Perreault - Hershey Bears

== See also ==
- List of AHL seasons

Preceded by 1957–58 AHL season	AHL seasons	Succeeded by 1959–60 AHL season
