= 1955–56 AHL season =

- League: American Hockey League
- Sport: Ice hockey

Regular season
- F. G. "Teddy" Oke Trophy: Providence Reds
- Season MVP: Johnny Bower
- Top scorer: Zellio Toppazzini

Playoffs
- Champions: Providence Reds
- Runners-up: Cleveland Barons

AHL seasons
- 1954–55 1956–57

The 1955–56 AHL season was the 20th season of the American Hockey League. Six teams played 64 games each in the schedule. The Providence Reds finished first overall in the regular season, and won their fourth Calder Cup championship.

== Final standings ==
Note: GP = Games played; W = Wins; L = Losses; T = Ties; GF = Goals for; GA = Goals against; Pts = Points;

| Overall | GP | W | L | T | Pts | GF | GA |
|---|---|---|---|---|---|---|---|
| Providence Reds (NYR) | 64 | 45 | 17 | 2 | 92 | 263 | 193 |
| Pittsburgh Hornets (TOR) | 64 | 43 | 17 | 4 | 90 | 271 | 186 |
| Buffalo Bisons (CHI) | 64 | 29 | 30 | 5 | 63 | 239 | 250 |
| Cleveland Barons (independent) | 64 | 26 | 31 | 7 | 59 | 225 | 231 |
| Hershey Bears (BOS) | 64 | 19 | 39 | 6 | 44 | 218 | 271 |
| Springfield Indians (independent) | 64 | 17 | 45 | 2 | 36 | 212 | 297 |

== Scoring leaders ==
Note: GP = Games played; G = Goals; A = Assists; Pts = Points; PIM = Penalty minutes

| Player | Team | GP | G | A | Pts | PIM |
|---|---|---|---|---|---|---|
| Zellio Toppazzini | Providence Reds | 64 | 42 | 71 | 113 | 44 |
| Willie Marshall | Pittsburgh Hornets | 58 | 45 | 52 | 97 | 47 |
| Camille Henry | Providence Reds | 59 | 50 | 41 | 91 | 8 |
| Ken Wharram | Buffalo Bisons | 59 | 27 | 63 | 90 | 27 |
| Dunc Fisher | Hershey Bears | 60 | 40 | 43 | 83 | 73 |
| Paul Larivee | Providence Reds | 54 | 27 | 53 | 80 | 38 |
| Fred Glover | Cleveland Barons | 64 | 31 | 48 | 79 | 187 |
| Larry Wilson | Buffalo Bisons | 62 | 39 | 39 | 78 | 74 |

- complete list

== Calder Cup playoffs ==
First round

- Providence Reds defeated Buffalo Bisons 3 games to 2.
- Cleveland Barons defeated Pittsburgh Hornets 3 games to 1.

Finals

- Providence Reds defeated Cleveland Barons 4 games to 0, to win the Calder Cup.
- list of scores

== All Star Classic ==
The 3rd AHL All-Star game was played on January 10, 1956, at the Duquesne Gardens in Pittsburgh, Pennsylvania. The defending Calder Cup champions Pittsburgh Hornets tied 4–4 with the AHL All-Stars.

== Trophy and Award winners ==
Team Awards

| Calder Cup; Playoff champions: | Providence Reds |
| F. G. "Teddy" Oke Trophy; Regular Season champions: | Providence Reds |

Individual Awards

| Les Cunningham Award; Most valuable player: | Johnny Bower - Providence Reds |
| John B. Sollenberger Trophy; Top point scorer: | Zellio Toppazzini - Providence Reds |
| Dudley "Red" Garrett Memorial Award; Rookie of the year: | Bruce Cline - Providence Reds |
| Harry "Hap" Holmes Memorial Award; Lowest goals against average: | Gil Mayer - Pittsburgh Hornets |

== See also ==
- List of AHL seasons

| Preceded by 1954–55 AHL season | AHL seasons | Succeeded by 1956–57 AHL season |
