= Eddie Olson =

American ice hockey player

Edward F. Olson (January 1, 1922 – February 10, 1995) was an American ice hockey player, born in Hancock, Michigan. He was one of nine brothers from the Upper Peninsula of Michigan, all of whom played college, amateur, pro or Olympic hockey.

Olson started his hockey career playing amateur for the Marquette Sentinels. He soon moved to the Coast Guard Cutters, playing two seasons with other hockey stars like John Mariucci and Frank Brimsek before being shipped out in 1944.

Olson played professionally in the American Hockey League for the St. Louis Flyers (1946–1951) and the Cleveland Barons (1951–1955). He was the first American-born player to win the league scoring title in 1953, as well as earning MVP that same year. His final season was as a player–coach, winning the league championship with the Victoria Cougars (1955–1956), the first American to coach a Canadian team. After his playing career he went on to coach many different amateur and high school teams, and never had a losing season. He was inducted into the United States Hockey Hall of Fame in 1977 and the St. Louis Amateur Hockey Hall of Fame in March 2008.

== Awards ==
1953 American Hockey League MVP

1953 and 1955 American Hockey League leading scorer
