= Paul Larivee =

Canadian ice hockey player

- Born: September 7, 1930; Montreal, QC, CAN
- Died: December 8, 2003 (aged 73); Bury, QC, CAN
- Height: 5 ft 11 in (180 cm)
- Weight: 165 lb (75 kg; 11 st 11 lb)
- Position: Center
- Shot: Left
- Played for: Providence Reds
- Playing career: 1948–1964

Paul Andre Larivee (September 7, 1930 – December 8, 2003) was a Canadian professional hockey player who played for the Providence Reds in the American Hockey League.
