= 1959–60 AHL season =

- League: American Hockey League
- Sport: Ice hockey

Regular season
- F. G. "Teddy" Oke Trophy: Springfield Indians
- Season MVP: Fred Glover
- Top scorer: Fred Glover

Playoffs
- Champions: Springfield Indians
- Runners-up: Rochester Americans

AHL seasons
- 1958–59 1960–61

The 1959–60 AHL season was the 24th season of the American Hockey League. Seven teams played 72 games each in the schedule. The Quebec Aces become the first Canada-based team in the league. The Springfield Indians finished first overall in the regular season, and won their first Calder Cup championship.

== Team changes ==
- The Quebec Aces, based in Quebec City, transfer to the AHL as an expansion team, from the defunct Quebec Hockey League.

== Final standings ==
Note: GP = Games played; W = Wins; L = Losses; T = Ties; GF = Goals for; GA = Goals against; Pts = Points;

| Overall | GP | W | L | T | Pts | GF | GA |
|---|---|---|---|---|---|---|---|
| Springfield Indians (NYR) | 72 | 43 | 23 | 6 | 92 | 280 | 219 |
| Rochester Americans (MTL/TOR) | 72 | 40 | 27 | 5 | 85 | 285 | 211 |
| Providence Reds (BOS) | 72 | 38 | 32 | 2 | 78 | 251 | 237 |
| Cleveland Barons (independent) | 72 | 34 | 30 | 8 | 76 | 267 | 229 |
| Buffalo Bisons (CHI) | 72 | 33 | 35 | 4 | 70 | 251 | 271 |
| Hershey Bears (DET) | 72 | 28 | 37 | 7 | 63 | 226 | 238 |
| Quebec Aces (independent) | 72 | 19 | 51 | 2 | 40 | 178 | 333 |

== Scoring leaders ==
Note: GP = Games played; G = Goals; A = Assists; Pts = Points; PIM = Penalty minutes

| Player | Team | GP | G | A | Pts | PIM |
|---|---|---|---|---|---|---|
| Fred Glover | Cleveland Barons | 72 | 38 | 69 | 107 | 143 |
| Bill Sweeney | Springfield Indians | 67 | 37 | 59 | 96 | 14 |
| Floyd Smith | Springfield Indians | 71 | 31 | 51 | 82 | 26 |
| Stan Baluik | Providence Reds | 65 | 23 | 57 | 80 | 60 |
| Willie Marshall | Hershey Bears | 72 | 38 | 40 | 78 | 99 |
| Larry Wilson | Buffalo Bisons | 64 | 33 | 45 | 78 | 18 |
| Dick Gamble | Buffalo Bisons | 72 | 27 | 50 | 77 | 22 |
| Stan Smrke | Rochester Americans | 67 | 40 | 36 | 76 | 18 |
| Bruce Cline | Springfield Indians | 70 | 25 | 50 | 75 | 9 |
| Bob Nevin | Rochester Americans | 71 | 32 | 42 | 74 | 10 |

- complete list

== Calder Cup playoffs ==
First round

- Springfield Indians defeated Providence Reds 4 games to 1.
- Rochester Americans defeated Cleveland Barons 4 games to 3.

Finals

- Springfield Indians defeated Rochester Americans 4 games to 1, to win the Calder Cup.
- list of scores

== All Star Classic ==
The 7th AHL All-Star Game was played on December 10, 1959, at the Eastern States Coliseum, in West Springfield, Massachusetts. The Springfield Indians defeated the AHL All-Stars by an 8–3 score.

== Trophy and award winners ==
Team awards

| Calder Cup; Playoff champions: | Springfield Indians |
| F. G. "Teddy" Oke Trophy; Regular Season champions: | Springfield Indians |

Individual awards

| Les Cunningham Award; Most valuable player: | Fred Glover - Cleveland Barons |
| John B. Sollenberger Trophy; Top point scorer: | Fred Glover - Cleveland Barons |
| Dudley "Red" Garrett Memorial Award; Rookie of the year: | Stan Baluik - Providence Reds |
| Eddie Shore Award; Defenceman of the year: | Larry Hillman - Providence Reds |
| Harry "Hap" Holmes Memorial Award; Lowest goals against average: | Ed Chadwick - Rochester Americans |

== See also ==
- List of AHL seasons

| Preceded by 1958–59 AHL season | AHL seasons | Succeeded by 1960–61 AHL season |
