= 1957–58 AHL season =

- League: American Hockey League
- Sport: Ice hockey

Regular season
- F. G. "Teddy" Oke Trophy: Hershey Bears
- Season MVP: Johnny Bower
- Top scorer: Willie Marshall

Playoffs
- Champions: Hershey Bears
- Runners-up: Springfield Indians

AHL seasons
- 1956–57 1958–59

The 1957–58 AHL season was the 22nd season of the American Hockey League. Six teams each played 70 games in their schedules. The Hershey Bears finished first overall in the regular season, and won their second Calder Cup championship.

== Final standings ==
Note: GP = Games played; W = Wins; L = Losses; T = Ties; GF = Goals for; GA = Goals against; Pts = Points;

Overall	GP	W	L	T	Pts	GF	GA
Hershey Bears (BOS/DET)	70	39	24	7	85	241	198
Cleveland Barons (independent)	70	39	28	3	81	232	163
Providence Reds (NYR)	70	33	32	5	71	237	220
Springfield Indians (BOS)	70	29	33	8	66	231	246
Rochester Americans (MTL/TOR)	70	29	35	6	64	205	242
Buffalo Bisons (CHI)	70	25	42	3	53	224	301

== Scoring leaders ==
Note: GP = Games played; G = Goals; A = Assists; Pts = Points; PIM = Penalty Minutes

Player	Team	GP	G	A	Pts	PIM
Willie Marshall	Hershey Bears	68	40	64	104	56
Dunc Fisher	Hershey Bears	70	41	47	88	56
Jimmy Moore	Cleveland Barons	70	25	58	83	44
Cal Gardner	Springfield Indians	69	24	57	81	49
Gerry Ehman	Springfield Indians	68	40	39	79	32
Larry Wilson	Buffalo Bisons	70	26	53	79	48
Bill Sweeney	Providence Reds	70	31	46	77	24
Bruce Carmichael	Providence Reds	70	22	55	77	26
Fred Glover	Cleveland Barons	64	28	48	76	147
Floyd Smith	Springfield Indians	70	25	50	75	60

- complete list

== Calder Cup playoffs ==
First round

- Hershey Bears defeated Providence Reds 4 games to 1.
- Springfield Indians defeated Cleveland Barons 4 games to 3.

Finals

- Hershey Bears defeated Springfield Indians 4 games to 2, to win the Calder Cup.
- list of scores

== All Star Classic ==
The 5th AHL All-Star game was played on October 6, 1957, at the Rochester Community War Memorial in Rochester, New York. The defending Calder Cup champions Cleveland Barons lost 5–2 to the AHL All-Stars.

== Trophy and Award winners ==
Team Awards

Calder Cup; Playoff champions:	Hershey Bears
F. G. "Teddy" Oke Trophy; Regular Season champions:	Hershey Bears

Individual Awards

Les Cunningham Award; Most valuable player:	Johnny Bower – Cleveland Barons
John B. Sollenberger Trophy; Top point scorer:	Willie Marshall – Hershey Bears
Dudley "Red" Garrett Memorial Award; Rookie of the year:	Bill Sweeney – Providence Reds
Harry "Hap" Holmes Memorial Award; Lowest goals against average:	Johnny Bower – Cleveland Barons

== See also ==
- List of AHL seasons

Preceded by 1956–57 AHL season	AHL seasons	Succeeded by 1958–59 AHL season
