= 1956–57 AHL season =

- League: American Hockey League
- Sport: Ice hockey

Regular season
- F. G. "Teddy" Oke Trophy: Providence Reds
- Season MVP: Johnny Bower
- Top scorer: Fred Glover

Playoffs
- Champions: Cleveland Barons
- Runners-up: Rochester Americans

AHL seasons
- 1955–56 1957–58

The 1956–57 AHL season was the 21st season of the American Hockey League. Six teams played 64 games each in the schedule. The Providence Reds repeated their first overall finish in the regular season. The Cleveland Barons won their eighth Calder Cup championship.

== Team changes ==
- The Pittsburgh Hornets move to Rochester, New York, becoming the Rochester Americans.

== Final standings ==
Note: GP = Games played; W = Wins; L = Losses; T = Ties; GF = Goals for; GA = Goals against; Pts = Points;

Overall	GP	W	L	T	Pts	GF	GA
Providence Reds (NYR)	64	34	22	8	76	236	168
Cleveland Barons (independent)	64	35	26	3	73	249	210
Rochester Americans (MTL/TOR)	64	34	25	5	73	224	199
Hershey Bears (BOS)	64	32	28	4	68	223	237
Buffalo Bisons (CHI)	64	25	37	2	52	209	270
Springfield Indians (independent)	64	19	41	4	42	217	274

== Scoring leaders ==
Note: GP = Games played; G = Goals; A = Assists; Pts = Points; PIM = Penalty minutes

Player	Team	GP	G	A	Pts	PIM
Fred Glover	Cleveland Barons	64	42	57	99	111
Willie Marshall	Hershey Bears	64	35	59	94	18
Jimmy Moore	Cleveland Barons	64	23	66	89	31
Paul Larivee	Providence Reds	64	46	43	89	24
Bronco Horvath	Rochester Americans	56	37	44	81	39
Boris Elik	Cleveland Barons	61	40	40	80	82
Dunc Fisher	Hershey Bears	64	40	38	78	59
Ken Wharram	Buffalo Bisons	64	28	49	77	18

- complete list

== Calder Cup playoffs ==
First round

- Rochester Americans defeated Providence Reds 4 games to 1.
- Cleveland Barons defeated Hershey Bears 4 games to 3.

Finals

- Cleveland Barons defeated Rochester Americans 4 games to 1, to win the Calder Cup.
- list of scores

== All Star Classic ==
The 4th AHL All-Star game was played on October 23, 1956, at the Rhode Island Auditorium in Providence, Rhode Island. The defending Calder Cup champions Providence Reds won 4–0 versus the AHL All-Stars.

== Trophy and Award winners ==
Team Awards

Calder Cup; Playoff champions:	Cleveland Barons
F. G. "Teddy" Oke Trophy; Regular Season champions:	Providence Reds

Individual Awards

Les Cunningham Award; Most valuable player:	Johnny Bower - Providence Reds
John B. Sollenberger Trophy; Top point scorer:	Fred Glover - Cleveland Barons
Dudley "Red" Garrett Memorial Award; Rookie of the year:	Boris Elik - Cleveland Barons
Harry "Hap" Holmes Memorial Award; Lowest goals against average:	Johnny Bower - Providence Reds

== See also ==
- List of AHL seasons

Preceded by 1955–56 AHL season	AHL seasons	Succeeded by 1957–58 AHL season
