= 1952–53 AHL season =

- League: American Hockey League
- Sport: Ice hockey

Regular season
- F. G. "Teddy" Oke Trophy: Cleveland Barons
- Season MVP: Eddie Olson
- Top scorer: Eddie Olson

Playoffs
- Champions: Cleveland Barons
- Runners-up: Pittsburgh Hornets

AHL seasons
- 1951–52 1953–54

The 1952–53 AHL season was the 17th season of the American Hockey League. The league loses two teams, bringing an end to East & West Divisions. The F. G. "Teddy" Oke Trophy is now awarded to the regular season champions. Seven teams played 64 games each in the schedule. The Cleveland Barons won their ninth Oke Trophy, and their sixth Calder Cup.

== Team changes ==
- The Indianapolis Capitals cease operations.
- The Cincinnati Mohawks transfer to the International Hockey League.

== Final standings ==
Note: GP = Games played; W = Wins; L = Losses; T = Ties; GF = Goals for; GA = Goals against; Pts = Points;

Overall	GP	W	L	T	Pts	GF	GA
Cleveland Barons (independent)	64	42	20	2	86	248	164
Pittsburgh Hornets (TOR)	64	37	21	6	80	223	149
Syracuse Warriors (independent)	64	31	31	2	64	213	201
Hershey Bears (BOS)	64	31	32	1	63	208	217
Providence Reds (independent)	64	27	36	1	55	215	254
St. Louis Flyers (CHI/DET)	64	26	37	1	53	212	258
Buffalo Bisons (MTL)	64	22	39	3	47	160	236

== Scoring leaders ==
Note: GP = Games played; G = Goals; A = Assists; Pts = Points; PIM = Penalty minutes

Player	Team	GP	G	A	Pts	PIM
Eddie Olson	Cleveland Barons	61	32	54	86	33
Guyle Fielder	St. Louis Flyers	62	22	61	83	12
Jack Gordon	Cleveland Barons	64	20	58	78	6
Kelly Burnett	Syracuse Warriors	56	23	53	76	16
Ike Hildebrand	Cleveland Barons	64	38	34	72	40
Calum MacKay	Buffalo Bisons	64	28	42	70	65
Steve Wochy	Cleveland Barons	64	37	31	68	16
Zellio Toppazzini	Providence Reds	64	35	32	67	23
Lorne Davis	Buffalo Bisons	64	33	34	67	49
Willie Marshall	Pittsburgh Hornets	62	27	39	66	58

- complete list

== Calder Cup playoffs ==
First round

- Cleveland Barons defeated Syracuse Warriors 3 games to 1.
- Pittsburgh Hornets defeated Hershey Bears 3 games to 0.

Finals

- Cleveland Barons defeated Pittsburgh Hornets 4 games to 3, to win the Calder Cup.
- list of scores

== Trophy and Award winners ==
Team Awards

Calder Cup; Playoff champions:	Cleveland Barons
F. G. "Teddy" Oke Trophy; Regular Season champions:	Cleveland Barons

Individual Awards

Les Cunningham Award; Most valuable player:	Eddie Olson - Cleveland Barons
Carl Liscombe Trophy; Top point scorer:	Eddie Olson - Cleveland Barons
Dudley "Red" Garrett Memorial Award; Rookie of the year:	Guyle Fielder - St. Louis Flyers
Harry "Hap" Holmes Memorial Award; Lowest goals against average:	Gil Mayer - Pittsburgh Hornets

== See also ==
- List of AHL seasons

Preceded by 1951–52 AHL season	AHL seasons	Succeeded by 1953–54 AHL season
