= List of Vancouver Canucks players =

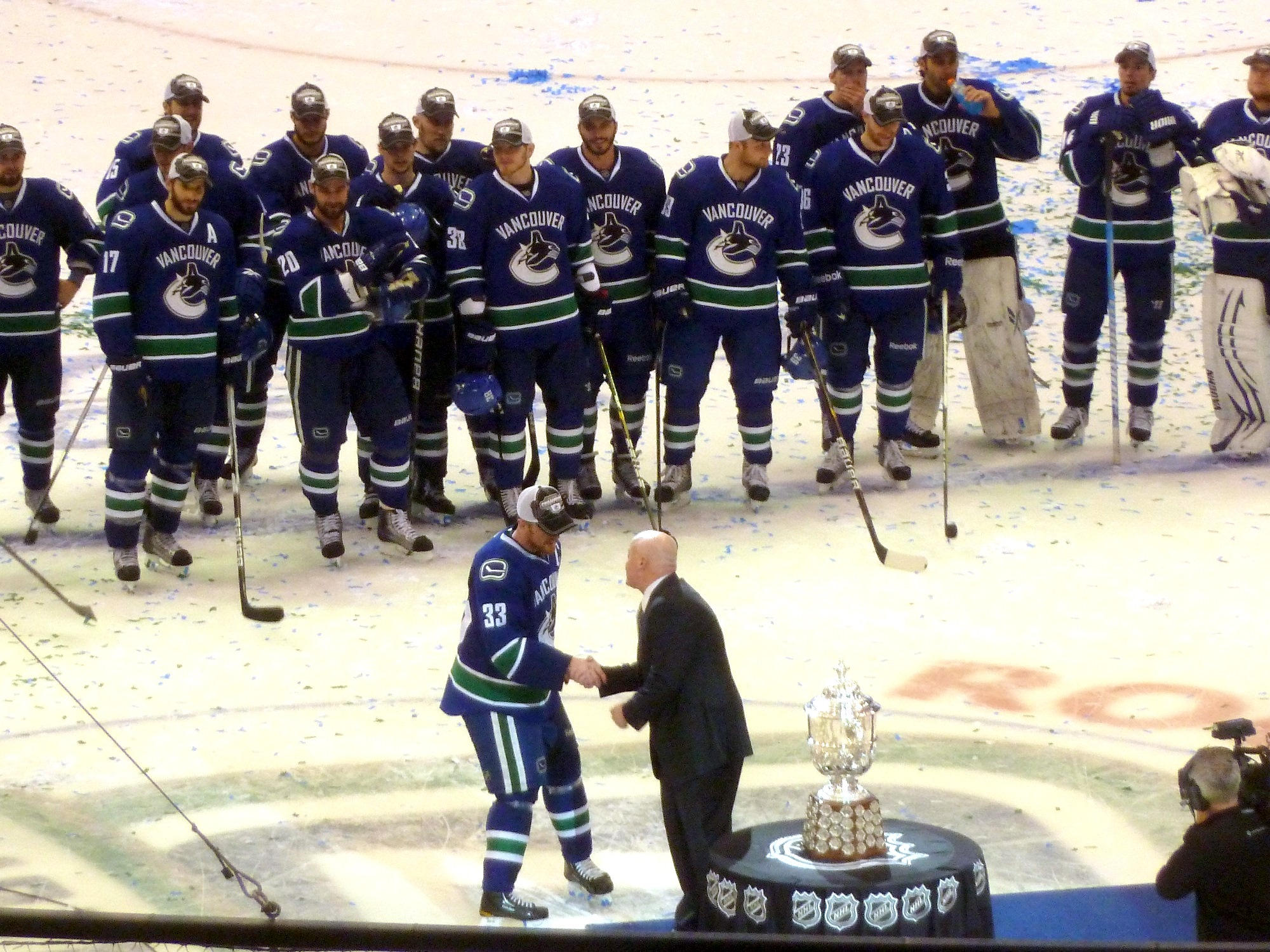
Vancouver Canucks captain Henrik Sedin accepts the Clarence S. Campbell Bowl on behalf of the team as the 2011 Western Conference playoff champions.

The Vancouver Canucks are a franchise team in the National Hockey League (NHL). As of 20 May 2024, 67 goaltenders and 620 skaters (forwards and defencemen) have appeared in at least one regular-season or playoff game with the Canucks since the team joined the NHL in the inaugural 1970–71 season. The 687 all-time members of the Canucks are listed below, with statistics complete through the end of the 2023–24 NHL season. It includes players that have played at least one regular season or playoff game for the Vancouver Canucks since the franchise was established in 1970.

The "Seasons" column lists the first year of the season of the player's first game and the last year of the season of the player's last game. For example, a player who played one game in the 2000–01 NHL season would be listed as playing with the team from 2000 to 2001, regardless of what calendar year the game occurred within.

There have been 13 Canucks players who have served as the captain. The franchise's first captain was Orland Kurtenbach, who captained the team until his retirement in 1974. The longest-tenured Canucks captain was Stan Smyl, who was appointed for eight seasons. Smyl and Henrik Sedin are the only Canucks captains to have spent their entire NHL playing career with the team. Trevor Linden, who captained from 1990 to 1997, played 16 seasons with the Canucks, a franchise high. Swede Markus Naslund, who captained for seven seasons^{[a]}, was the first non-Canadian to have captained the Canucks. Though goaltenders are not permitted to act as captains during games, Roberto Luongo served as the captain from 2008 to 2010, but because of the NHL rule against goaltender captains, the League did not allow Luongo to serve as captain on-ice. In his place, Willie Mitchell was responsible for dealing with officials during games, while Henrik Sedin was responsible for ceremonial faceoffs and other ceremonial duties. Luongo was not permitted to wear the "C" on his jersey, but it was incorporated into the artwork on the front of his mask. The most recent captain of the Vancouver Canucks is Quinn Hughes, who became captain beginning in the 2023–24 NHL season.

== Key ==
- * Appeared in a Canucks' game during the 2025–2026 season.
- † Hockey Hall of Famer, or retired number.

Abbreviations
GP	Games played
HHOF	Elected to the Hockey Hall of Fame
Ret	Retired jersey

Goaltenders
W	Wins
SO	Shutouts
L	Losses
GAA	Goals against average
T	Ties
OTL ^{a}	Overtime losses
SV% ^{b}	Save percentage

Skaters
Pos	Position	RW	Right wing	A	Assists
D	Defenceman	C	Center	P	Points
LW	Left wing	G	Goals	PIM	Penalty minutes

This list does not include data from the Vancouver Canucks of the Pacific Coast Hockey League or Western Hockey League.

Statistics complete as of the 2025–26 NHL season.

== Goaltenders ==
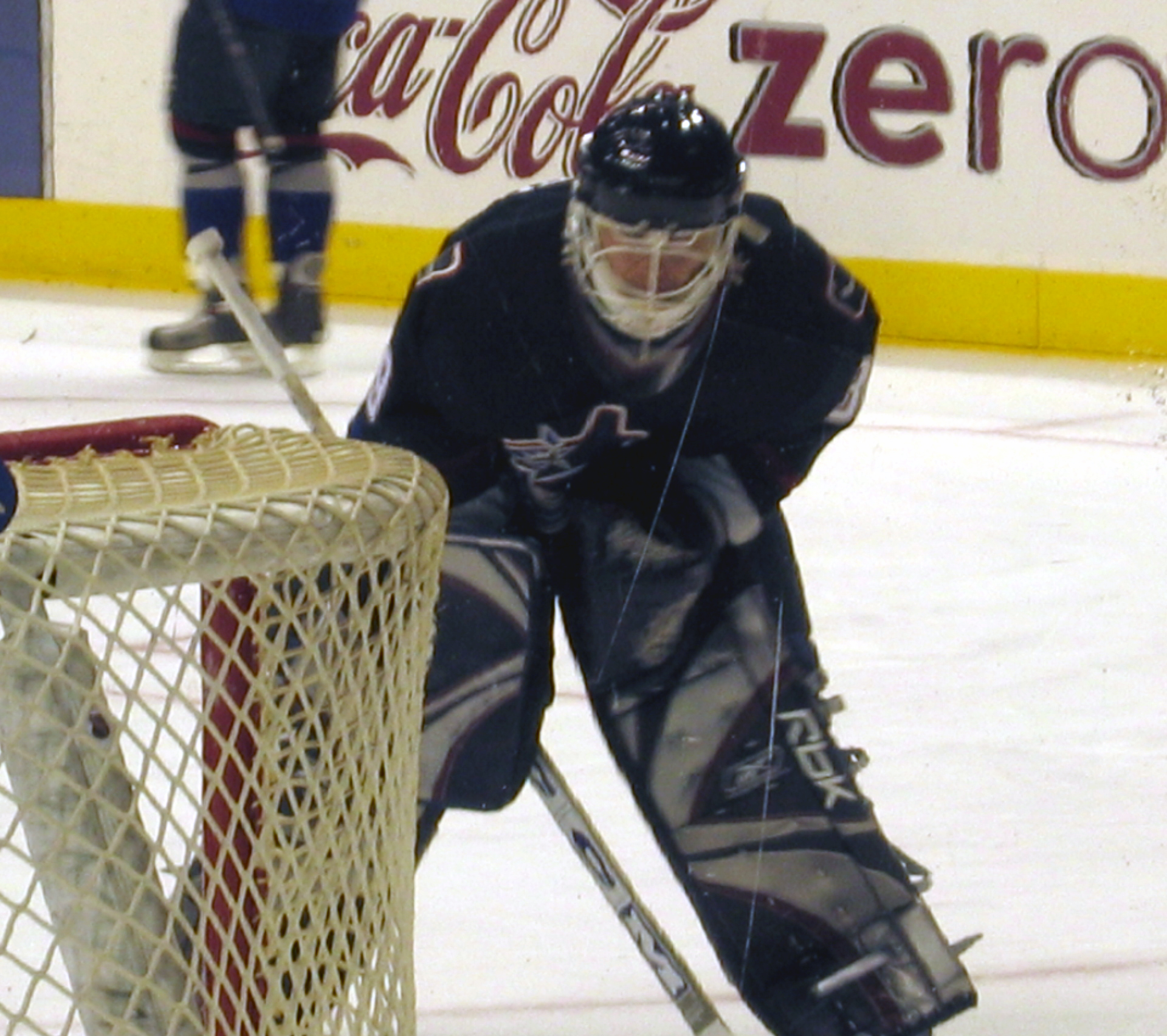
Dan Cloutier recorded three consecutive 30–win seasons in his five years with the Canucks.

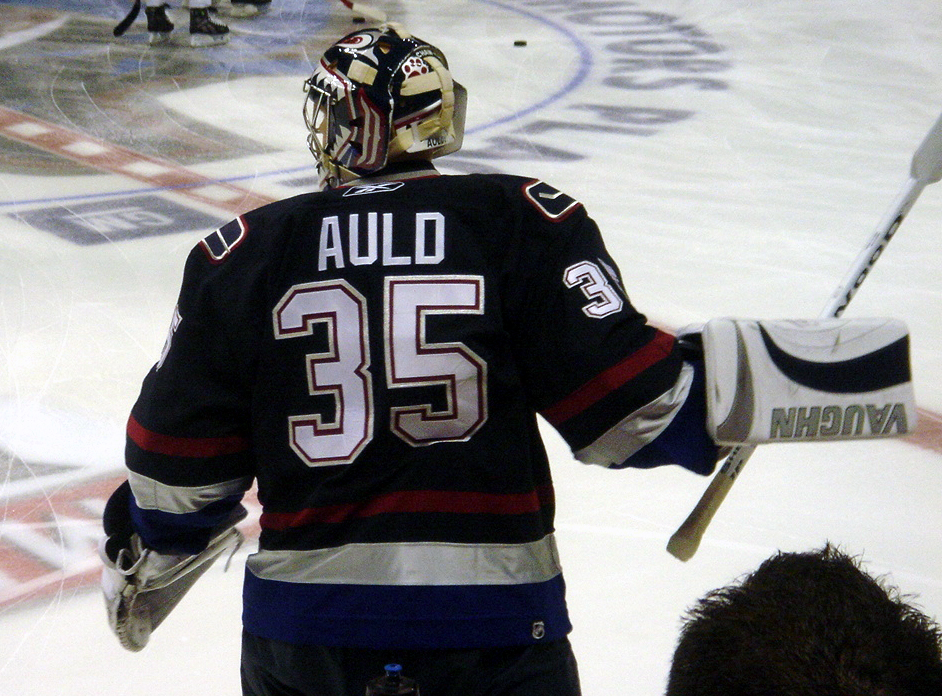
Alex Auld served as the backup goalie to Cloutier from 2002 to 2006.

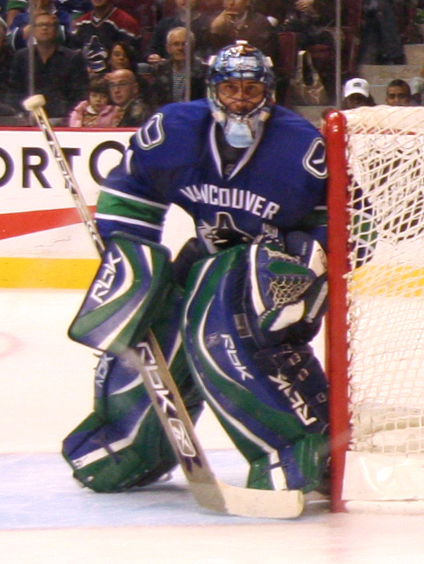
Acquired prior to the 2006–07 NHL season, Roberto Luongo played in 448 regular season games for the Canucks.

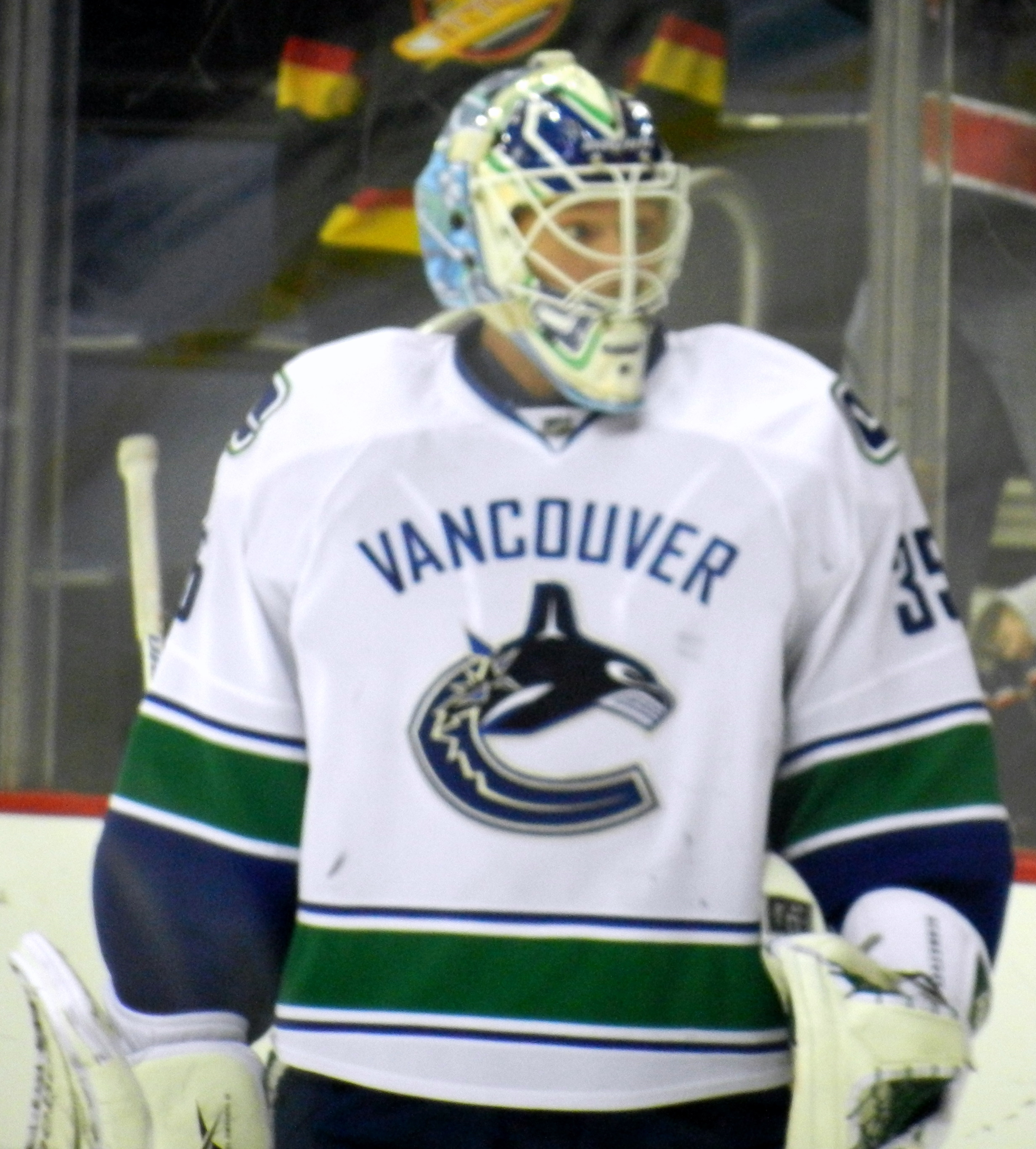
Cory Schneider shared the Jennings Trophy with Roberto Luongo during the 2010–11 season.

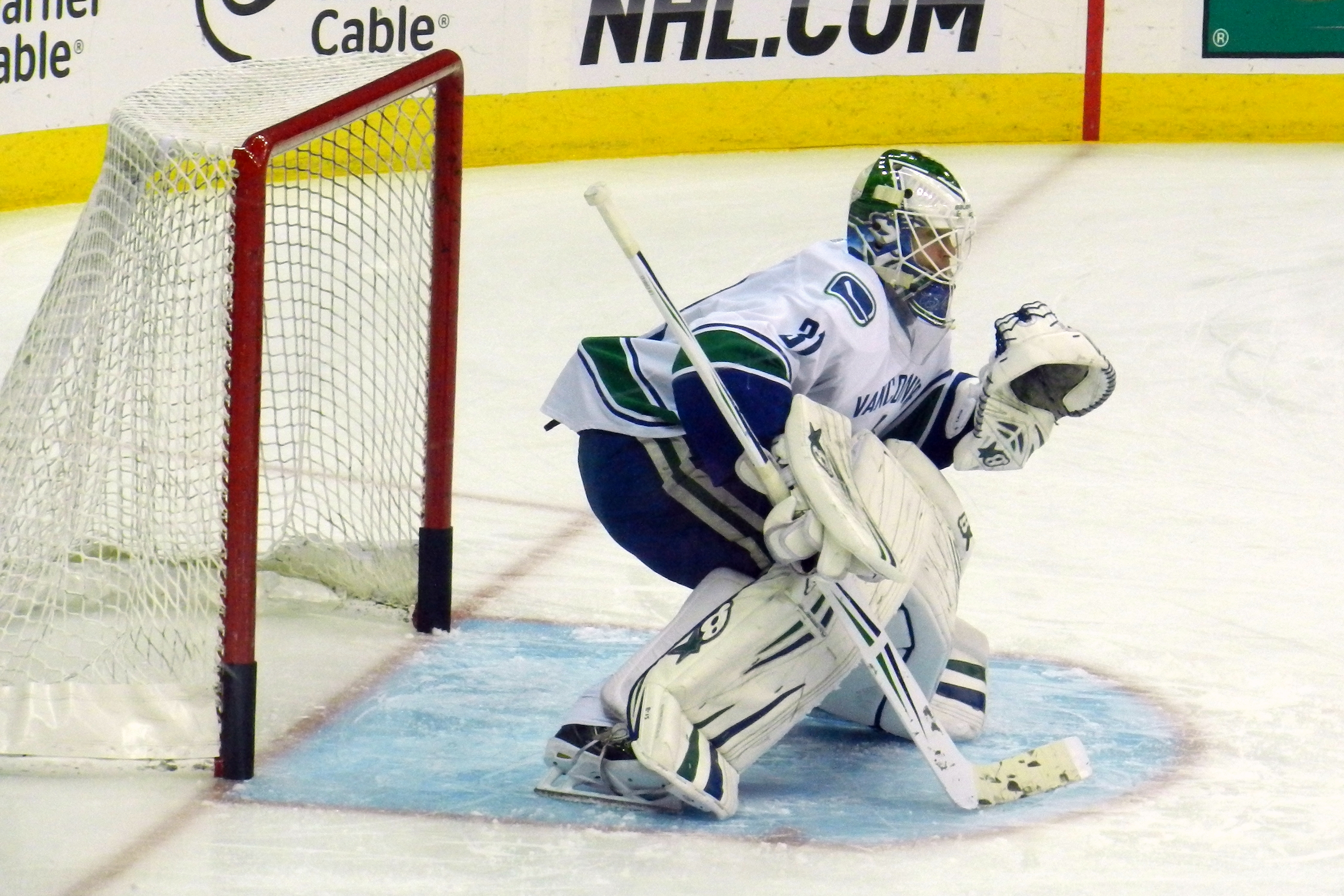
Eddie Lack playing for the Canucks during the 2013–14 season

Name	Nationality	Seasons	GP	W	L	T	OTL	SO	GAA	SV%	GP	W	L	SO	GAA	SV%	Notes
Name	Nationality	Seasons	Regular-season								Playoffs						Notes
Alex Auld	Canada	2001–2006	81	39	31	2	8	1	2.75	.907	4	1	2	0	2.48	.892	
Richard Bachman	United States	2015–2017; 2018–2019	7	3	4	—	0	0	3.18	.901	—	—	—	—	—	—	
Murray Bannerman	Canada	1977–1978	1	0	0	0	—	0	0.00	—	—	—	—	—	—	—	
Martin Brochu	Canada	2001–2002	6	0	3	0	—	0	4.16	.856	—	—	—	—	—	—	
Richard Brodeur	Canada	1980–1988	377	126	173	62	—	6	3.87	—	29	12	17	1	3.28	—	
Gary Bromley	Canada	1978–1981	73	25	27	14	—	3	3.63	—	7	2	5	0	4.17	—	
Bruce Bullock	Canada	1972–1977	16	3	9	3	—	0	4.79	—	—	—	—	—	—	—	
Sean Burke	Canada	1997–1998	16	2	9	4	—	0	3.51	.876	—	—	—	—	—	—	
Frank Caprice	Canada	1982–1988	102	31	46	11	—	1	4.20	.860	—	—	—	—	—	—	
Jacques Caron	Canada	1973–1974	10	2	5	1	—	0	4.90	—	—	—	—	—	—	—	
Dan Cloutier	Canada	2000–2006	208	109	68	23	1	14	2.42	.906	25	10	13	0	3.31	.872	
Collin Delia	United States	2022–2023	20	10	6	—	2	0	3.28	.892	—	—	—	—	—	—	
Thatcher Demko*	United States	2017–2026	262	134	99	—	21	10	2.81	.909	5	3	1	1	0.97	.974	
Casey DeSmith	United States	2023–2024	29	12	9	—	6	1	2.89	.895	2	1	1	0	2.02	.911	
Michael DiPietro	Canada	2018–2022	3	0	2	—	0	0	5.25	.771	—	—	—	—	—	—	
Louis Domingue	Canada	2019–2020	1	0	1	—	0	0	4.08	.882	—	—	—	—	—	—	
Ed Dyck	Canada	1971–1972	49	8	28	5	—	1	4.35	—	—	—	—	—	—	—	
Ken Ellacott	Canada	1982–1983	12	2	3	4	—	0	4.43	.867	—	—	—	—	—	—	
Joacim Eriksson	Sweden	2013–2014	1	0	0	—	0	0	9.99	.806	—	—	—	—	—	—	
Bob Essensa	Canada	2000–2001	39	18	12	3	—	1	2.68	.892	2	0	2	0	2.95	.897	
Mike Fountain	Canada	1996–1997	6	2	2	0	—	1	3.43	.896	—	—	—	—	—	—	
Troy Gamble	Canada	1986–1992	72	22	29	9	—	1	3.61	.875	4	1	3	0	3.85	.880	
George Gardner	Canada	1970–1971	42	9	22	4	—	0	3.84	—	—	—	—	—	—	—	
John Garrett	Canada	1982–1985	56	22	21	5	—	1	4.11	.864	3	1	0	0	3.08	—	
Jaroslav Halak	Slovakia	2021–2022	17	4	7	—	2	0	2.94	.903	—	—	—	—	—	—	
Glen Hanlon	Canada	1977–1982	137	43	66	21	—	5	3.56	—	2	0	0	0	3.00	—	
Johan Hedberg	Sweden	2003–2004	21	8	6	2	—	3	2.51	.900	2	1	1	0	2.45	.922	
Rick Heinz	Canada	1981–1982	3	2	1	0	—	1	3.00	—	—	—	—	—	—	—	
Corey Hirsch	Canada	1995–1998	101	32	42	13	—	4	3.13	.873	6	2	3	0	3.74	.873	
Charlie Hodge	Canada	1970–1971	35	15	13	5	—	0	3.42	—	—	—	—	—	—	—	
Braden Holtby	Canada	2020–2021	21	7	11	—	3	0	3.67	.889	—	—	—	—	—	—	
Arturs Irbe	Latvia	1997–1998	41	14	11	6	—	2	2.73	.907	—	—	—	—	—	—	
Jason LaBarbera	Canada	2008–2009	9	3	2	—	2	0	2.66	.915	—	—	—	—	—	—	
Eddie Lack	Sweden	2013–2015	41	16	17	—	5	4	2.41	.912	—	—	—	—	—	—	
Kevin Lankinen*	Finland	2024–2026	98	36	42	—	15	4	3.12	.889	—	—	—	—	—	—	
Ken Lockett	Canada	1974–1976	55	13	15	8	2	—	3.35	—	1	0	1	0	6.00	—	
Roberto Luongo^{†}	Canada	2006–2014	448	252	137	—	50	38	2.36	.919	64	32	31	5	2.54	.916	Captain, 2008–2010; Jennings Trophy – 2011; HHOF — 2022
Drew MacIntyre	Canada	2007–2008	2	0	1	—	0	0	2.95	.864	—	—	—	—	—	—	
Cesare Maniago	Canada	1976–1978	93	27	45	17	—	2	3.68	—	—	—	—	—	—	—	
Jacob Markstrom	Sweden	2013–2020	229	99	93	—	27	5	2.73	.913	14	8	6	1	2.85	.919	
Spencer Martin	Canada	2021–2023	35	14	15	—	4	0	3.56	.887	—	—	—	—	—	—	
Bob Mason	United States	1990–1991	6	2	4	0	—	0	4.93	.846	—	—	—	—	—	—	
Steve McKichan	Canada	1990–1991	1	0	0	0	—	0	6.00	.750	—	—	—	—	—	—	
Kirk McLean	Canada	1987–1998	516	211	228	62	—	20	3.28	.887	68	34	34	6	2.84	.907	
Dave McLelland	Canada	1972–1973	2	1	1	0	—	0	5.00	—	—	—	—	—	—	—	
Rob McVicar	Canada	2005–2006	1	0	0	0	—	0	0.00	1.000	—	—	—	—	—	—	
Alfie Michaud	Canada	1999–2000	2	0	1	0	—	0	4.35	.815	—	—	—	—	—	—	
Ryan Miller	United States	2014–2017	150	64	68	—	16	7	2.69	.914	3	1	1	0	2.31	.910	
Tyler Moss	Canada	2002–2003	1	0	0	0	—	0	2.73	.929	—	—	—	—	—	—	
Anders Nilsson	Sweden	2017–2019	39	10	22	—	5	2	3.33	.899	—	—	—	—	—	—	
Mika Noronen	Finland	2005–2006	4	1	1	—	0	0	3.52	.870	—	—	—	—	—	—	
Maxime Ouellet	Canada	2005–2006	4	0	2	—	0	0	3.25	.894	—	—	—	—	—	—	
Jiří Patera*	Czech Republic	2025–2026	1	0	1	—	0	0	7.39	.825	—	—	—	—	—	—	
Félix Potvin	Canada	1999–2001	69	26	30	10	—	1	2.84	.897	—	—	—	—	—	—	
Andrew Raycroft	Canada	2009–2010	21	9	5	—	1	1	2.42	.902	1	0	0	0	2.44	.857	
Curt Ridley	Canada	1975–1980	96	25	44	16	—	1	3.80	—	2	0	2	0	4.00	—	
Dany Sabourin	Canada	2006–2007	9	2	4	—	1	0	2.63	.906	2	0	0	0	4.14	.909	
Curtis Sanford	Canada	2007–2009	35	11	11	—	1	1	2.69	.903	—	—	—	—	—	—	
Cory Schneider	United States	2008–2013	98	55	26	—	8	9	2.20	.927	10	1	4	0	2.59	.922	Jennings Trophy – 2011
Corey Schwab	Canada	1999–2000	6	2	1	1	—	0	3.57	.861	—	—	—	—	—	—	
Arturs Silovs	Latvia	2022–2025	19	8	8	—	2	0	3.13	.880	10	5	5	1	2.91	.898	
Peter Skudra	Latvia	2001–2003	46	19	13	8	—	2	2.57	.902	2	0	1	0	3.13	.891	
Gary Smith	Canada	1973–1976	189	72	81	23	—	11	3.32	—	4	1	3	0	3.27	—	
Garth Snow	United States	1997–2000	109	33	52	11	—	6	2.87	.901	—	—	—	—	—	—	
Nikita Tolopilo*	Belarus	2024–2026	23	7	12	—	2	0	3.51	.882	—	—	—	—	—	—	
Kevin Weekes	Canada	1998–2000	31	6	15	5	—	1	3.20	.887	—	—	—	—	—	—	
Steve Weeks	Canada	1987–1991	66	19	34	11	—	0	3.44	.885	3	1	1	0	3.43	.899	
Kay Whitmore	Canada	1992–1995	74	36	28	6	—	1	3.39	.877	1	0	0	0	6.00	.900	
Dunc Wilson	Canada	1970–1973; 1978–1979	148	34	86	12	—	2	3.92	—	—	—	—	—	—	—	
Wendell Young	Canada	1985–1987	30	5	15	4	—	0	3.99	.874	1	0	1	0	5.00	.844	

== Skaters ==
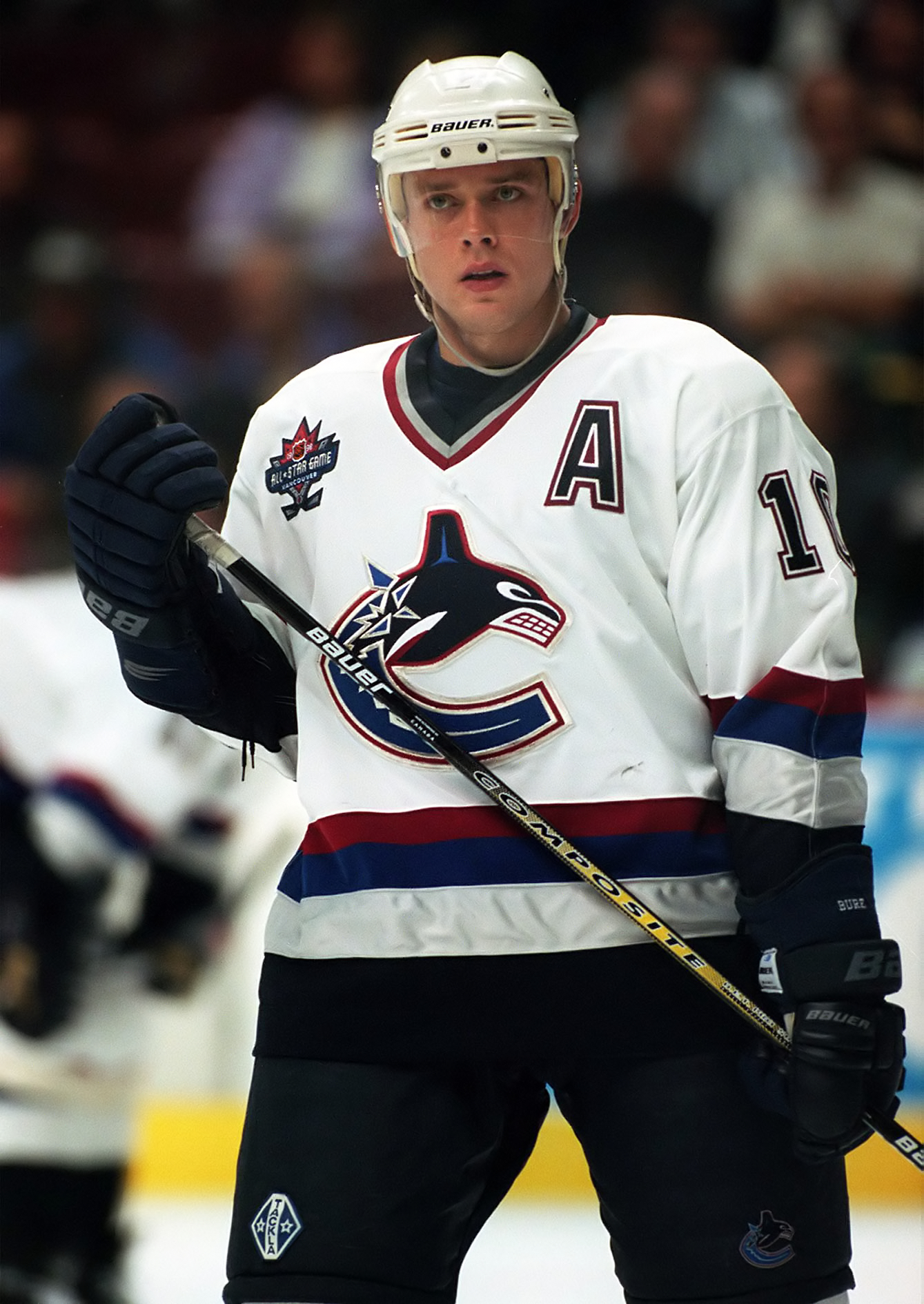
Pavel Bure was one of the highest scoring Canucks of all time in his seven seasons with the team, recording 478 points in only 428 games.

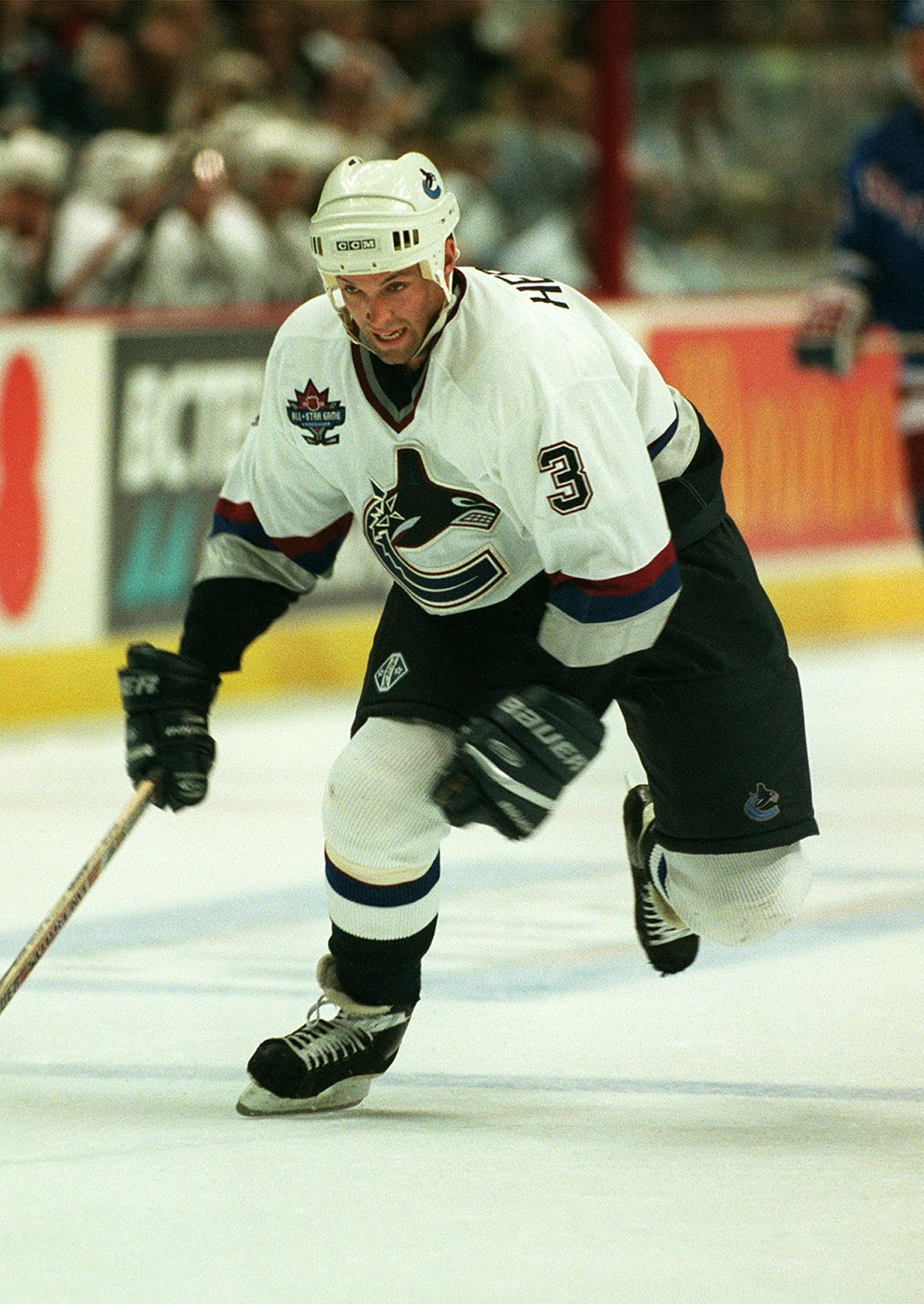
In his six seasons with the Canucks, Bret Hedican played in 310 games while recording 102 points.

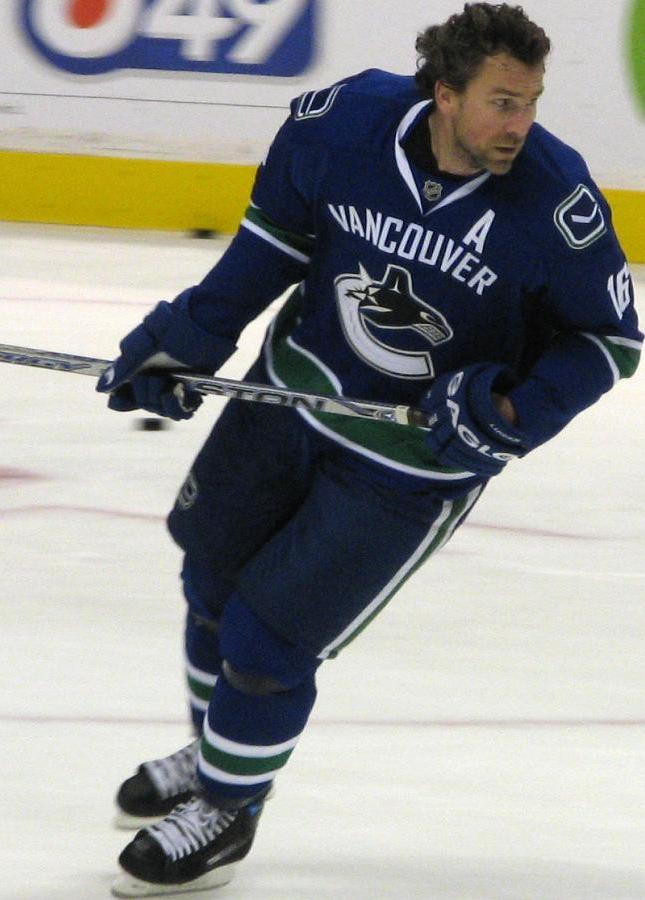
Former captain Trevor Linden holds the Canucks franchise record for career games played (1138).

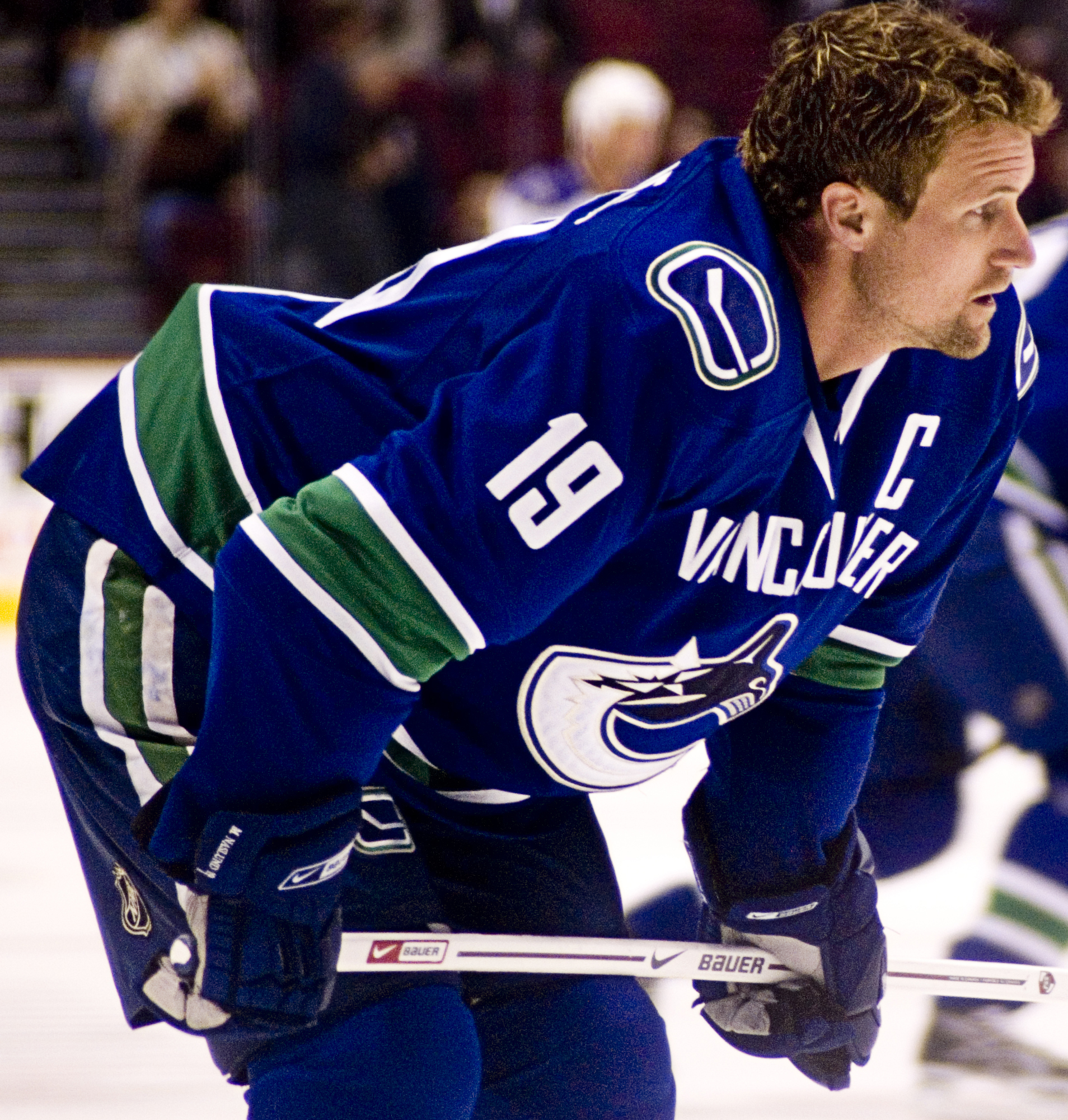
Markus Naslund was the Canucks captain for eight seasons.

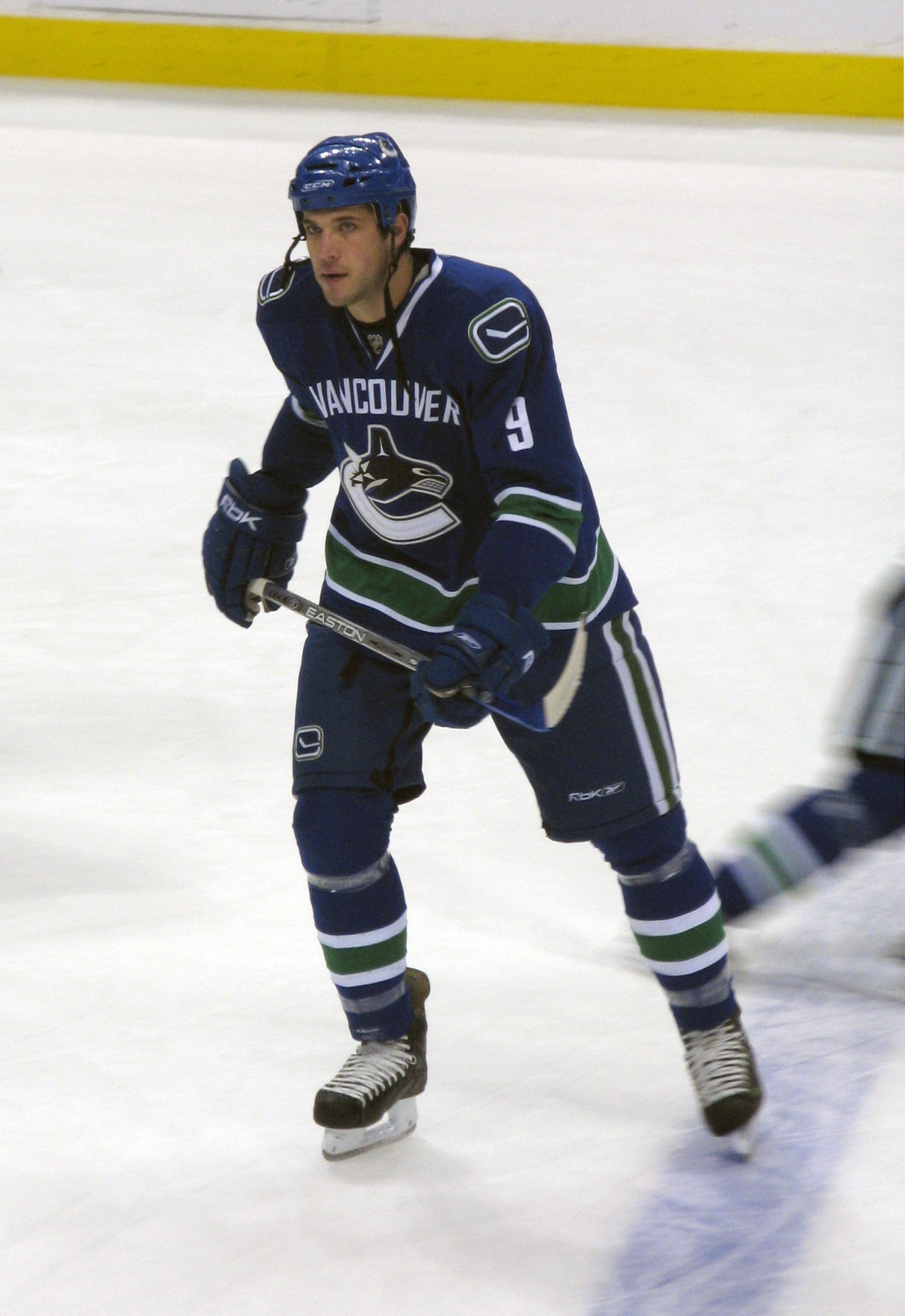
In each of his two seasons with the Canucks, Taylor Pyatt recorded 37 points, a career high for points in a season.

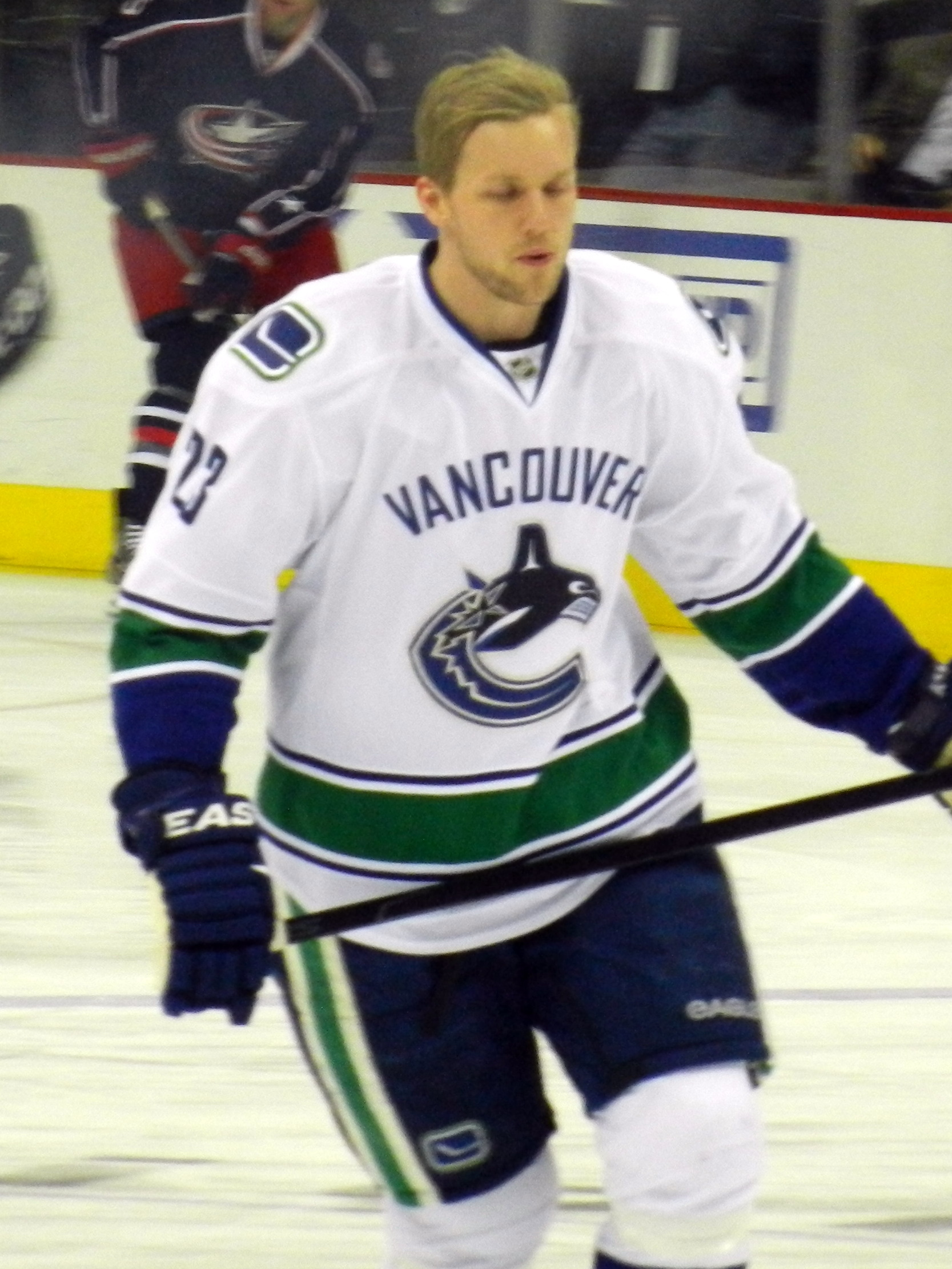
Alexander Edler began his Canucks' career in 2006.

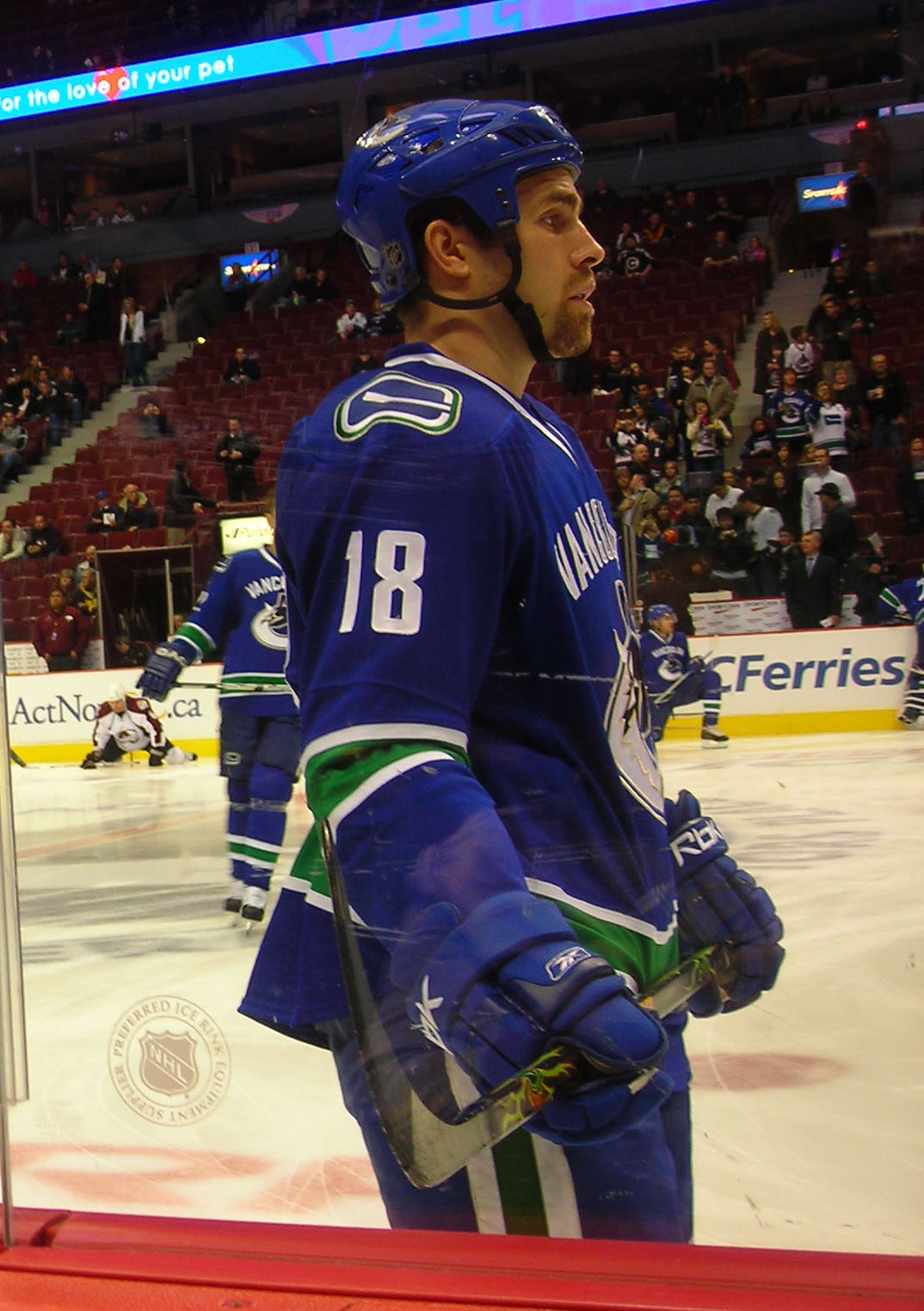
Mike Weaver joined the Canucks for the 2007–08 NHL season and finished the year with one assist in his 55 games.

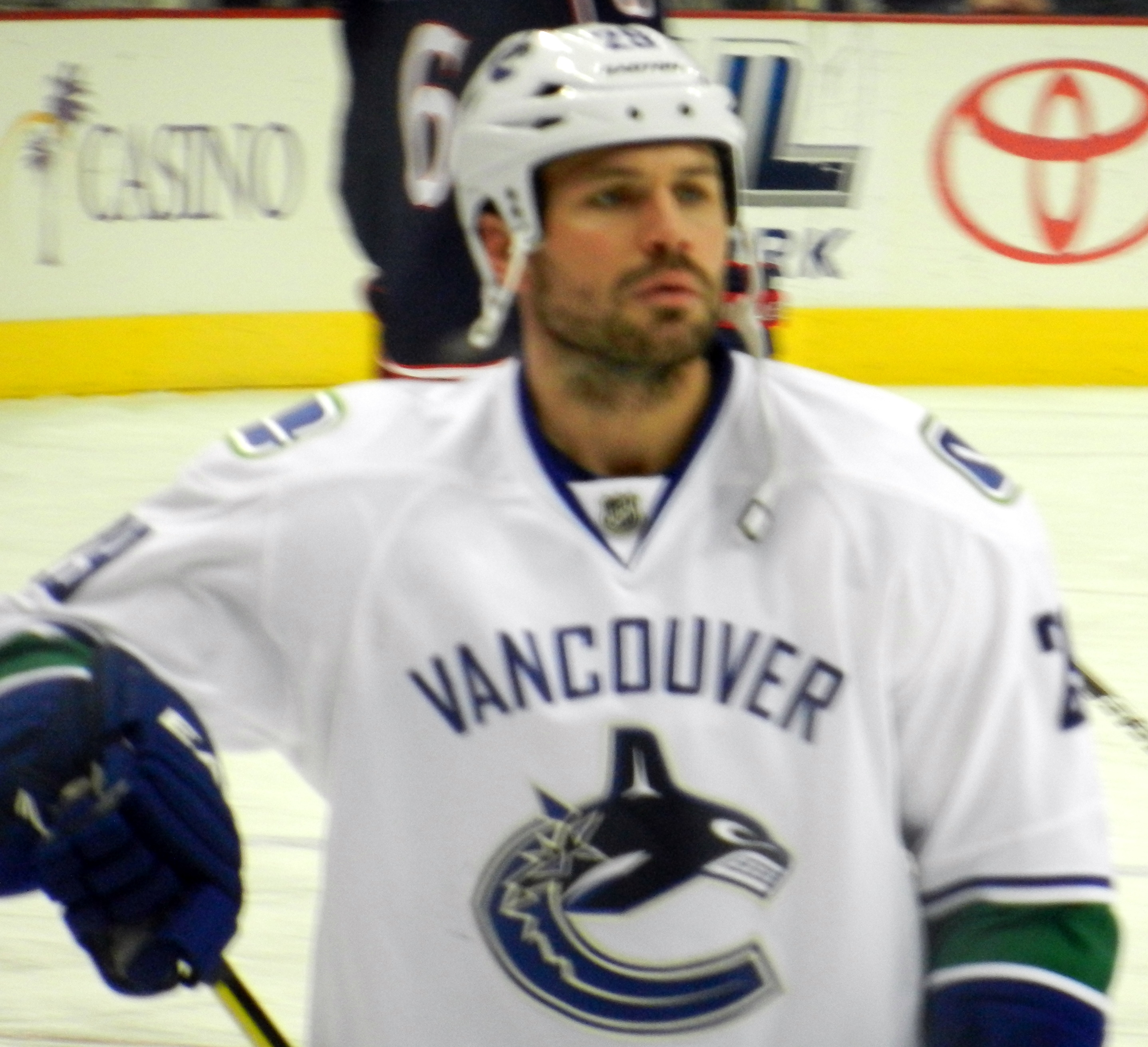
Aaron Rome played 49 games in 2009–10, his first season with Vancouver.

Name	Nationality	Pos	Seasons	GP	G	A	P	PIM	GP	G	A	P	PIM	Notes
Name	Nationality	Pos	Seasons	Regular season					Playoffs					Notes
Greg C. Adams	Canada	LW	1988–1989	12	4	2	6	35	7	0	0	0	21	
Greg D. Adams	Canada	LW	1987–1995	489	179	190	369	154	53	15	19	34	16	
Bruce Affleck	Canada	D	1979–1980	5	0	1	1	0	—	—	—	—	—	
Jim Agnew	Canada	D	1986–1992	65	0	1	1	189	4	0	0	0	6	
Andrew Alberts	United States	D	2009–2014	134	4	9	13	126	23	0	1	1	35	
Claire Alexander	Canada	D	1977–1978	32	8	18	26	6	—	—	—	—	—	
Bryan Allen	Canada	D	2000–2006	216	14	18	32	288	7	0	0	0	6	
Nils Aman*	Sweden	C	2022–2026	132	8	21	29	28	5	0	0	0	0	
Jonas Andersson	Sweden	RW	2010–2011	4	0	0	0	0	—	—	—	—	—	
Shawn Antoski	Canada	LW	1990–1995	70	1	2	3	265	16	0	1	1	36	
John Arbour	Canada	D	1970–1971	13	0	0	0	12	—	—	—	—	—	
Darren Archibald	Canada	LW	2013–2014; 2017–2019	52	6	8	14	26	—	—	—	—	—	
Magnus Arvedson	Sweden	LW	2003–2004	41	8	7	15	12	—	—	—	—	—	
Brent Ashton	Canada	LW	1979–1981	124	23	25	48	68	7	1	0	1	8	
Adrian Aucoin	Canada	D	1994–2001	341	49	71	120	245	10	1	0	1	2	
Dave Babych	Canada	D	1991–1998	409	23	131	154	290	60	9	18	27	42	
Sven Baertschi	Switzerland	LW	2014–2020	225	58	52	110	56	2	0	0	0	0	
Justin Bailey	United States	RW	2019–2022	19	0	0	0	0	—	—	—	—	—	
Arshdeep Bains*	Canada	F	2023–2026	49	2	4	6	18	—	—	—	—	—	
Peter Bakovic	Canada	LW	1987–1988	10	2	0	2	48	—	—	—	—	—	
Jozef Balej	Slovakia	RW	2005–2006	1	0	1	1	0	—	—	—	—	—	
Keith Ballard	United States	D	2010–2013	148	3	13	16	146	14	0	1	0	8	
Dave Balon	Canada	LW	1971–1973	116	22	21	43	43	—	—	—	—	—	
Cam Barker	Canada	D	2012–2013	14	0	2	2	4	—	—	—	—	—	
Murray Baron	Canada	D	1998–2003	383	10	34	44	375	24	0	5	5	20	
Robin Bartell	Canada	D	1986–1987	40	0	1	1	14	—	—	—	—	—	
Matt Bartkowski	United States	D	2015–2016	80	6	12	18	50	—	—	—	—	—	
Nolan Baumgartner	Canada	D	2002–2004; 2005–2006; 2009–2010	99	7	35	42	38	3	0	0	0	0	
Robin Bawa	Canada	C	1991–1992	2	0	0	0	0	1	0	0	0	0	
Jay Beagle	Canada	C	2018–2021	142	6	20	26	64	17	1	1	2	10	
Ethan Bear	Canada	D	2022–2023	61	3	13	16	25	—	—	—	—	—	
Anthony Beauvillier	Canada	LW	2022–2024	55	11	17	28	18	—	—	—	—	—	
Kris Beech	Canada	C	2007–2008	4	1	1	2	0	—	—	—	—	—	
Jesse Bélanger	Canada	C	1995–1996	9	3	0	3	4	3	0	2	2	2	
Neil Belland	Canada	D	1981–1986	106	13	31	44	54	21	2	9	11	23	
Jordie Benn	Canada	D	2019–2021	75	2	14	16	26	07	0	0	0	0	
Jim Benning	Canada	D	1986–1990	241	15	55	70	172	3	0	0	0	0	
Josef Beranek	Czech Republic	C	1994–1996	98	14	27	41	88	14	3	2	5	12	
Drake Berehowsky	Canada	D	2000–2003	39	2	3	5	39	4	0	0	0	12	
Marc Bergevin	Canada	D	2003–2004	9	0	2	2	2	3	0	0	0	2	
Steve Bernier	Canada	RW	2008–2010	140	26	28	54	48	22	6	3	9	7	
Ken Berry	Canada	LW	1987–1989	27	4	4	8	11	—	—	—	—	—	
Todd Bertuzzi	Canada	RW	1997–2006	518	188	261	449	822	24	6	8	14	82	
Alex Biega	Canada	D	2014–2019	179	4	32	36	94	—	—	—	—	—	
Kevin Bieksa	Canada	D	2005–2015	597	56	185	241	879	71	10	15	25	122	
Byron Bitz	Canada	RW	2011–2012	10	1	3	4	14	1	0	0	0	15	
Rick Blight	Canada	RW	1975–1981	324	96	125	221	168	5	0	5	5	2	
Mario Bliznak	Slovakia	C	2009–2011	6	1	0	1	0	—	—	—	—	—	
Ken Block	Canada	D	1970–1971	1	0	0	0	0	—	—	—	—	—	
Teddy Blueger*	Latvia	C	2023–2026	185	23	48	71	92	13	0	2	2	6	
Gregg Boddy	Canada	D	1971–1976	273	23	44	67	263	12	0	2	2	19	
Doug Bodger	Canada	D	1999–2000	13	0	1	1	4	—	—	—	—	—	
Brock Boeser*	United States	RW	2016–2026	629	226	256	482	150	29	11	12	23	18	
Lonny Bohonos	Canada	RW	1995–1998	70	13	13	26	14	—	—	—	—	—	
Ivan Boldirev	Canada	C	1979–1983	216	80	104	184	105	22	9	6	15	4	
Alexandre Bolduc	Canada	C	2008–2011	46	2	3	5	38	3	0	0	0	0	
Larry Bolonchuk	Canada	D	1972–1973	15	0	0	0	6	—	—	—	—	—	
Nick Bonino	United States	C	2014–2015	75	15	24	39	22	6	1	2	3	4	
Ryan Bonni	Canada	D	1999–2000	3	0	0	0	0	—	—	—	—	—	
David Booth	United States	LW	2011–2014	134	26	25	51	54	5	0	1	1	0	
Paulin Bordeleau	Canada	C	1973–1976	183	33	56	89	47	5	2	1	3	0	
Reid Boucher	United States	RW	2016–2019	48	8	4	12	6	—	—	—	—	—	
Tyler Bouck	Canada	RW	2003–2007	36	2	3	5	60	1	0	0	0	0	
André Boudrias	Canada	C	1970–1976	458	121	267	388	140	6	1	0	1	0	Captain, 1975–1976
Luc Bourdon	Canada	D	2006–2008	36	2	0	2	24	—	—	—	—	—	
Madison Bowey	Canada	D	2021–2022	2	0	0	0	00	—	—	—	—	—	
Randy Boyd	Canada	D	1987–1989	62	7	17	24	64	—	—	—	—	—	
Travis Boyd	United States	C	2020–2021	19	2	0	2	00	—	—	—	—	—	
Steve Bozek	Canada	LW	1988–1991	191	46	44	90	118	10	0	2	2	4	
Brian Bradley	Canada	C	1987–1991	193	51	81	132	155	7	3	4	7	10	
Erik Brannstrom	Sweden	D	2024–2025	28	3	5	8	17	—	—	—	—	—	
Per-Olov Brasar	Sweden	LW	1979–1982	181	37	63	100	21	13	1	2	3	0	
Donald Brashear	United States	LW	1996–2002	388	50	53	103	1,159	4	0	0	0	0	
Mel Bridgman	Canada	C	1988–1989	15	4	3	7	10	7	1	2	3	10	
Guillaume Brisebois	Canada	D	2018–2025	30	1	2	3	6	—	—	—	—	—	
Wade Brookbank	Canada	D	2003–2006	52	3	2	5	176	—	—	—	—	—	
Cam Brown	Canada	LW	1990–1991	1	0	0	0	7	—	—	—	—	—	
Jeff Brown	Canada	D	1993–1996	72	10	44	54	44	29	7	12	19	39	
Mike W. Brown	Canada	LW	2000–2002	16	0	0	0	77	—	—	—	—	—	
Mike S. Brown	United States	RW	2007–2009	39	1	1	2	140	—	—	—	—	—	
Sean Brown	Canada	D	2005–2006	12	0	0	0	8	—	—	—	—	—	
David Bruce	Canada	LW	1985–1989	143	23	18	41	245	1	0	0	0	0	
Jiri Bubla	Czechoslovakia	D	1981–1986	256	17	101	118	202	6	0	0	0	7	
Zeev Buium*	United States	D	2025–2026	45	3	9	12	33	—	—	—	—	—	
Jan Bulis	Czech Republic	C	2006–2007	79	12	11	23	70	12	1	1	2	2	
Pavel Bure^{†}	Soviet Union; Russia	RW	1991–1998	428	254	224	478	328	60	34	32	66	72	Calder Trophy — 1992; HHOF — 2012; Ret — #10
Alexander Burmistrov	Russia	C	2017–2018	24	2	4	6	12	—	—	—	—	—	
Kyle Burroughs	Canada	D	2021–2023	90	3	7	10	101	—	—	—	—	—	
Alexandre Burrows	Canada	LW	2005–2017	822	193	191	384	1,066	70	19	15	34	124	
Rod Buskas	Canada	D	1989–1990	17	0	3	3	36	—	—	—	—	—	
Garth Butcher	Canada	D	1981–1991	610	33	107	140	1,668	14	2	1	3	24	
Sven Butenschon	Germany	D	2005–2006	8	0	0	0	10	—	—	—	—	—	
Jerry Butler	Canada	RW	1979–1982	128	19	20	39	96	7	1	0	1	2	
Drew Callander	Canada	C	1978–1980	21	3	1	4	2	—	—	—	—	—	
Colin Campbell	Canada	D	1980–1982	89	1	16	17	206	19	2	3	5	98	
Dave Capuano	United States	LW	1989–1991	88	16	36	52	52	6	1	1	2	5	
Jack Capuano	United States	D	1990–1991	3	0	0	0	0	—	—	—	—	—	
Keith Carney	United States	D	2005–2006	18	0	2	2	14	—	—	—	—	—	
Larry Carrière	Canada	D	1976–1978	56	1	12	13	66	—	—	—	—	—	
Jimmy Carson	United States	C	1993–1994	34	7	10	17	22	2	0	1	1	0	
Anson Carter	Canada	RW	2005–2006	81	33	22	55	41	—	—	—	—	—	
Andrew Cassels	Canada	C	1999–2002	198	40	128	168	48	6	2	1	3	0	
Michael Chaput	Canada	C	2016–2018	77	4	5	9	34	—	—	—	—	—	
José Charbonneau	Canada	RW	1988–1995	46	8	8	16	55	3	1	0	1	4	
Jalen Chatfield	Canada	D	2020–2021	18	0	1	1	12	—	—	—	—	—	
Alex Chiasson	Canada	RW	2021–2022	67	13	9	22	24	—	—	—	—	—	
Marc Chouinard	Canada	C	2006–2007	42	2	2	4	10	—	—	—	—	—	
Mike Christie	United States	D	1980–1981	9	1	1	2	0	—	—	—	—	—	
Artem Chubarov	Russia	C	1999–2004	228	25	33	58	40	27	0	4	4	4	
Filip Chytil*	Czech Republic	C	2024–2026	27	5	4	9	10	—	—	—	—	—	
Enrico Ciccone	Canada	D	1997–1998	13	0	1	1	47	—	—	—	—	—	
Adam Clendening	United States	D	2014–2015	17	0	2	2	8	—	—	—	—	—	
Glen Cochrane	Canada	D	1985–1987	63	0	3	3	177	2	0	0	0	5	
Ian Cole	United States	D	2023–2024	78	2	9	11	61	13	0	2	2	6	
Wayne Connelly	Canada	RW	1971–1972	53	14	20	34	12	—	—	—	—	—	
Brandon Convery	Canada	C	1997–1999	19	2	9	11	08	—	—	—	—	—	
Bob Cook	Canada	RW	1970–1971	2	0	0	0	0	—	—	—	—	—	
Matt Cooke	Canada	LW	1998–2008	566	83	120	203	625	32	8	4	12	30	
Braeden Cootes*	Canada	C	2025–2026	3	0	0	0	0	—	—	—	—	—	
Frank Corrado	Canada	D	2012–2015	28	2	0	2	4	4	0	0	0	0	
Mike Corrigan	Canada	LW	1970–1972	95	24	32	56	130	—	—	—	—	—	
Patrick Coulombe	Canada	D	2006–2008	7	0	1	1	4	—	—	—	—	—	
Geoff Courtnall	Canada	LW	1990–1995	292	102	144	246	495	65	26	35	61	121	
Russ Courtnall	Canada	RW	1994–1997	141	39	72	111	68	17	5	11	16	23	
Larry Courville	Canada	LW	1995–1998	33	1	2	3	16	—	—	—	—	—	
Jeff Cowan	Canada	LW	2006–2008	88	7	4	11	203	10	2	0	2	2	
Craig Coxe	United States	C	1984–1988; 1989–1991	177	10	21	31	535	3	0	0	0	2	
Adam Cracknell	Canada	RW	2015–2016	44	5	5	10	14	—	—	—	—	—	
Joseph Cramarossa	Canada	LW	2016–2017	10	0	0	0	9	—	—	—	—	—	
Murray Craven	Canada	LW	1992–1994	88	15	50	65	42	34	8	15	23	22	
Marc Crawford	Canada	LW	1981–1987	176	19	31	50	229	20	1	2	3	44	
Troy Crowder	Canada	RW	1996–1997	30	1	2	3	52	—	—	—	—	—	
Ray Cullen	Canada	C	1970–1971	70	12	21	33	42	—	—	—	—	—	
Jassen Cullimore	Canada	D	1994–1997	64	2	3	5	62	11	0	0	0	12	
Tony Currie	Canada	RW	1981–1984	38	9	7	16	4	3	0	0	0	10	
J. J. Daigneault	Canada	D	1984–1986	131	9	46	55	114	3	0	2	2	0	
Bob Dailey	Canada	D	1973–1977	257	38	93	131	417	7	2	4	6	14	
Zac Dalpe	Canada	C	2013–2014	55	4	3	7	6	—	—	—	—	—	
Rob Davison	Canada	D	2008–2009	23	0	2	2	51	—	—	—	—	—	
Jake DeBrusk*	Canada	LW	2024–2026	163	51	39	90	30	—	—	—	—	—	
Brandon DeFazio	Canada	LW	2014–2015	2	0	0	0	0	—	—	—	—	—	
Ron Delorme	Canada	RW	1981–1985	210	17	20	37	383	23	1	2	3	49	
Michael Del Zotto	Canada	D	2017–2019	105	7	19	26	56	—	—	—	—	—	
Ab DeMarco, Jr.	United States	D	1974–1976	95	13	22	35	23	2	0	0	0	0	
Pavol Demitra	Slovakia	RW	2008–2010	97	23	46	69	20	17	3	6	9	6	
Bill Derlago	Canada	C	1978–1980	63	15	19	34	29	—	—	—	—	—	
Travis Dermott	Canada	D	2021–2023	28	2	1	3	2	—	—	—	—	—	
Guillaume Desbiens	Canada	RW	2009–2011	13	0	0	0	12	—	—	—	—	—	
Vincent Desharnais	Canada	D	2024–2025	34	0	3	3	34	—	—	—	—	—	
Phillip Di Giuseppe	Canada	LW	2022–2025	101	12	16	28	54	11	1	1	2	2	
Raphael Diaz	Switzerland	D	2013–2014	6	1	1	2	0	—	—	—	—	—	
Jason Dickinson	Canada	C	2021–2022	62	5	6	11	19	—	—	—	—	—	
Gerald Diduck	Canada	D	1990–1995	265	17	55	72	553	47	6	9	15	55	
Robert Dirk	Canada	D	1990–1994	217	9	18	27	401	28	0	0	0	39	
Gary Doak	Canada	D	1970–1972	82	2	11	13	135	—	—	—	—	—	
Derek Dorsett	Canada	RW	2014–2018	184	20	34	54	459	6	0	0	0	20	
Curtis Douglas*	Canada	C	2025–2026	14	1	1	2	16	—	—	—	—	—	
Jim Dowd	United States	C	1995–1996	38	1	6	7	6	1	0	0	0	0	
Nic Dowd	United States	C	2017–2018	40	3	0	3	16	—	—	—	—	—	
Justin Dowling	Canada	C	2021–2022	22	2	2	4	2	—	—	—	—	—	
Sheldon Dries	United States	C	2021–2023	74	13	7	20	29	—	—	—	—	—	
Harold Druken	Canada	C	1999–2003	118	27	29	56	30	4	0	1	1	0	
Mike Duco	Canada	LW	2011–2012	6	0	2	2	5	—	—	—	—	—	
Dale Dunbar	United States	D	1985–1986	1	0	0	0	2	—	—	—	—	—	
Dave Dunn	Canada	D	1973–1975	69	11	22	33	87	—	—	—	—	—	
Andrew Ebbett	Canada	C	2011–2013	46	6	6	12	10	3	0	0	0	0	
Alexander Edler	Sweden	D	2006–2021	925	99	310	409	655	82	8	30	38	60	
Christian Ehrhoff	Germany	D	2009–2011	159	28	66	94	94	35	5	14	19	24	
Neil Eisenhut	Canada	C	1993–1994	13	1	3	4	21	—	—	—	—	—	
Oliver Ekman-Larsson	Sweden	D	2021–2023	133	7	44	51	74	—	—	—	—	—	
Anders Eldebrink	Sweden	D	1981–1983	43	2	9	11	21	13	0	1	1	0	
Loui Eriksson	Sweden	LW	2016–2021	252	38	52	90	48	10	0	0	0	6	
Roland Eriksson	Sweden	C	1978–1979	35	2	12	14	4	—	—	—	—	—	
Emerson Etem	United States	LW	2015–2016	39	7	5	12	9	—	—	—	—	—	
Oscar Fantenberg	Sweden	D	2019–2020	36	1	5	6	6	16	0	0	0	4	
Fedor Fedorov	Russia	C	2002–2004	15	0	2	2	8	—	—	—	—	—	
Taylor Fedun	Canada	D	2015–2016	1	0	1	1	0	—	—	—	—	—	
Tom Fergus	United States	C	1991–1993	80	19	29	48	37	13	5	3	8	6	
Micheal Ferland	Canada	LW	2019–2020	14	1	4	5	7	2	0	0	0	7	
Benn Ferriero	United States	C	2013–2014	2	0	0	0	0	—	—	—	—	—	
Zack Fitzgerald	United States	D	2007–2008	1	0	0	0	0	—	—	—	—	—	
Rory Fitzpatrick	United States	D	2006–2007	58	1	6	7	46	3	0	0	0	6	
Rob Flockhart	Canada	LW	1976–1979	43	1	2	3	12	—	—	—	—	—	
Peter Folco	Canada	D	1973–1974	2	0	0	0	0	—	—	—	—	—	
Derek Forbort*	United States	D	2024–2026	56	2	9	11	47	—	—	—	—	—	
Dave Fortier	Canada	D	1976–1977	58	1	3	4	125	—	—	—	—	—	
Curt Fraser	United States	LW	1978–1983	348	92	114	206	651	27	4	9	13	108	
Mark Friedman	Canada	D	2023–2025	28	0	1	1	31	—	—	—	—	—	
Alex Friesen	Canada	C	2015–2016	1	0	0	0	0	—	—	—	—	—	
Jonah Gadjovich	Canada	LW	2020–2021	1	0	0	0	17	—	—	—	—	—	
Dave Gagner	Canada	C	1998–1999	33	2	12	14	24	—	—	—	—	—	
Sam Gagner	Canada	C	2017–2019	81	11	23	34	35	—	—	—	—	—	
Conor Garland*	United States	RW	2021–2026	371	82	139	221	184	13	3	2	5	2	
Jason Garrison	Canada	D	2012–2014	128	15	34	49	85	4	0	0	0	2	
Brad Gassoff	Canada	LW	1975–1979	122	19	17	36	163	3	0	0	0	0	
Adam Gaudette	United States	C	2017–2021	120	17	28	45	55	—	0	0	0	2	
Brendan Gaunce	Canada	C	2015–2019	117	6	9	15	45	—	—	—	—	—	
Martin Gélinas	Canada	LW	1993–1998	258	90	81	171	173	33	6	6	12	26	
Don Gibson	Canada	D	1990–1991	14	0	3	3	20	—	—	—	—	—	
Jere Gillis	United States	LW	1977–1981; 1983–1985	309	63	75	138	210	5	2	2	4	0	
Tanner Glass	Canada	LW	2009–2011	140	7	14	21	187	24	0	0	0	18	
Danny Gloor	Canada	C	1973–1974	2	0	0	0	0	—	—	—	—	—	
Brian Glynn	Canada	D	1993–1994	16	0	0	0	12	17	0	3	3	10	
Nikolay Goldobin	Russia	RW	2016–2020	114	18	26	44	24	—	—	—	—	—	
Larry Goodenough	Canada	D	1976–1980	113	7	21	28	75	1	0	0	0	2	
Andrew Gordon	Canada	RW	2012–2013	6	0	0	0	0	—	—	—	—	—	
Robb Gordon	Canada	C	1998–1999	4	0	0	0	2	—	—	—	—	—	
Lee Goren	Canada	RW	2005–2007	30	1	2	3	30	—	—	—	—	—	
John Gould	Canada	LW	1973–1977	218	82	76	158	53	7	3	2	5	0	
Larry Gould	Canada	LW	1973–1974	2	0	0	0	0	—	—	—	—	—	
Michael Grabner	Austria	RW	2009–2010	20	5	6	11	8	9	1	0	1	0	
Thomas Gradin	Sweden	C	1978–1986	613	197	353	550	280	38	17	21	38	20	
Marc-André Gragnani	Canada	D	2011–2012	14	1	2	3	6	—	—	—	—	—	
Markus Granlund	Finland	C	2015–2019	215	41	28	69	48	—	—	—	—	—	
Tyler Graovac	Canada	C	2019–2021	22	5	1	6	8	—	—	—	—	—	
Hilliard Graves	Canada	RW	1976–1979	196	42	61	0	49	—	—	—	—	—	
Josh Green	Canada	LW	2005–2007	90	6	7	13	39	9	0	1	1	12	
Randy Gregg	Canada	D	1991–1992	21	1	4	5	24	7	0	1	1	8	
Alexandre Grenier	Canada	RW	2015–2017	9	0	0	0	2	—	—	—	—	—	
Martin Grenier	Canada	D	2003–2004	7	1	0	1	9	—	—	—	—	—	
John Grisdale	Canada	D	1974–1979	199	3	32	35	266	10	0	1	1	15	
Erik Gudbranson	Canada	D	2016–2019	139	5	14	19	136	—	—	—	—	—	
Jocelyn Guevremont	Canada	D	1971–1975	227	44	88	132	124	—	—	—	—	—	
Kevan Guy	Canada	D	1988–1991	114	5	13	18	105	1	0	0	0	0	
Murray Hall	Canada	RW	1970–1972	109	27	44	71	28	—	—	—	—	—	
Taylor Hall	Canada	RW	1983–1987	34	7	9	16	25	—	—	—	—	—	
Doug Halward	Canada	D	1980–1987	324	45	118	163	389	26	6	5	11	71	
Dan Hamhuis	Canada	D	2010–2016	389	23	119	142	190	34	2	10	12	36	
Travis Hamonic	Canada	D	2020–2022	62	6	11	17	45	—	—	—	—	—	
Ken Hammond	Canada	D	1991–1992	—	—	—	—	—	2	0	0	0	6	
Jannik Hansen	Denmark	LW	2007–2017	565	105	130	235	260	64	7	11	18	42	
Jim Hargreaves	Canada	D	1970–1973	66	1	7	8	105	—	—	—	—	—	
Ed Hatoum	Canada	RW	1970–1971	26	1	3	4	21	—	—	—	—	—	
Greg Hawgood	Canada	D	1999–2001	95	7	22	29	32	—	—	—	—	—	
Todd Hawkins	Canada	LW	1988–1990	8	0	0	0	15	—	—	—	—	—	
Jayce Hawryluk	Canada	C	2020–2021	30	2	3	5	9	—	—	—	—	—	
Steve Hazlett	Canada	LW	1979–1980	1	0	0	0	0	—	—	—	—	—	
Bret Hedican	United States	D	1993–1999	310	17	85	102	281	41	1	9	10	32	
Danton Heinen	Canada	C/LW	2024–2025	51	6	12	18	31	—	—	—	—	—	
Bryan Helmer	Canada	D	2000–2003	62	7	9	16	71	6	0	0	0	0	
Darby Hendrickson	United States	C	1998–2000	67	7	6	13	36	—	—	—	—	—	
Chris Higgins	United States	LW	2010–2016	314	62	80	142	82	40	5	5	10	6	
Matthew Highmore	Canada	LW	2020–2022	64	8	9	17	16	—	—	—	—	—	
Akito Hirose	Canada	D	2022–2024	10	0	3	3	4	—	—	—	—	—	
Jan Hlavac	Czech Republic	LW	2001–2003	55	10	13	23	16	5	0	1	1	0	
Ivan Hlinka	Czechoslovakia	C	1981–1983	137	42	81	123	28	16	3	10	13	8	
Cody Hodgson	Canada	C	2010–2012	71	17	18	35	8	12	0	1	1	2	
Dan Hodgson	Canada	C	1986–1989	74	16	33	49	52	—	—	—	—	—	
Nils Höglander*	Sweden	LW	2020–2026	331	60	60	120	135	11	1	1	2	2	
Josh Holden	Canada	C	1998–2001	46	4	9	13	12	—	—	—	—	—	
Bruce Holloway	Canada	D	1984–1985	2	0	0	0	0	—	—	—	—	—	
Philip Holm	Sweden	D	2017–2018	1	0	0	0	0	—	—	—	—	—	
Randy Holt	Canada	D	1978–1979	22	1	3	4	80	—	—	—	—	—	
Ron Homenuke	Canada	RW	1972–1973	1	0	0	0	0	—	—	—	—	—	
Darcy Hordichuk	Canada	LW	2008–2010	129	5	2	7	251	10	1	0	1	14	
Bo Horvat	Canada	C	2014–2023	621	201	219	420	200	23	11	5	16	6	Captain, 2019–2023
Filip Hronek*	Czech Republic	D	2022–2026	228	18	113	131	111	13	1	1	2	6	
Willie Huber	Canada	D	1987–1989	35	4	10	14	40	—	—	—	—	—	
Greg Hubick	Canada	D	1979–1980	5	0	1	1	0	—	—	—	—	—	
John Hughes	Canada	D	1979–1980	52	2	11	13	181	4	0	0	0	10	
Quinn Hughes*	United States	D	2018–2026	459	61	371	432	187	30	2	24	26	8	
Brad Hunt	Canada	D	2021–2022	50	3	14	17	12	—	—	—	—	—	
Tim Hunter	Canada	RW	1992–1996	176	8	10	18	512	46	0	0	0	74	
Bob Hurlburt	Canada	LW	1974–1975	1	0	0	0	2	—	—	—	—	—	
Jamie Huscroft	Canada	D	1997–1999	33	0	2	2	118	—	—	—	—	—	
Ben Hutton	Canada	D	2015–2019	276	11	59	70	111	—	—	—	—	—	
Brad Isbister	Canada	RW	2007–2008	55	6	5	11	38	—	—	—	—	—	
Dane Jackson	Canada	RW	1993–1995	15	6	1	7	13	6	0	0	0	10	
Jason Jaffray	Canada	LW	2007–2009	33	4	6	10	33	—	—	—	—	—	
Nicklas Jensen	Denmark	RW	2012–2015	24	3	3	6	10	—	—	—	—	—	
Dan Johnson	Canada	C	1970–1972	77	16	14	30	16	—	—	—	—	—	
Ryan Johnson	Canada	C	2008–2010	120	3	11	14	24	14	1	1	2	4	
Mikko Jokela	Finland	D	2002–2003	1	0	0	0	0	—	—	—	—	—	
Jussi Jokinen	Finland	C	2017–2018	14	4	6	10	2	—	—	—	—	—	
Chris Joseph	Canada	D	1996–1997; 1999–2000	101	5	22	27	68	—	—	—	—	—	
Pierre-Olivier Joseph*	Canada	D	2025–2026	31	1	5	6	8	—	—	—	—	—	
Dakota Joshua	United States	C	2022–2025	199	36	33	69	158	13	4	4	8	10	
Derek Joslin	Canada	D	2012–2013	2	0	0	0	0	—	—	—	—	—	
Ed Jovanovski	Canada	D	1998–2006	434	57	177	234	536	31	9	10	19	36	
Olli Juolevi	Finland	D	2019–2021	23	2	1	3	0	1	0	0	0	0	
Noah Juulsen	Canada	D	2021–2025	109	1	8	9	49	2	0	0	0	4	
David Kämpf*	Czech Republic	C	2025–2026	38	2	4	6	10	—	—	—	—	—	
Evander Kane*	Canada	LW	2025–2026	71	13	18	31	92	—	—	—	—	—	
Sheldon Kannegiesser	Canada	D	1977–1978	42	1	7	8	36	—	—	—	—	—	
Steve Kariya	Canada	RW	1999–2002	65	9	18	27	32	—	—	—	—	—	
Linus Karlsson*	Sweden	C	2023–2026	106	18	23	41	48	2	0	0	0	2	
Zack Kassian	Canada	RW	2011–2015	171	32	27	59	287	8	0	0	0	6	
Pat Kavanagh	Canada	RW	2000–2004	6	2	0	2	2	3	0	0	0	2	
Mike Keane	Canada	RW	2003–2004	64	8	9	17	20	7	0	0	0	4	
Dennis Kearns	Canada	D	1971–1981	677	31	290	321	386	11	1	2	3	8	
Ronalds Kenins	Latvia	LW	2014–2016	38	4	8	12	14	5	1	1	2	4	
Dan Kesa	Canada	RW	1993–1994	19	2	4	6	18	—	—	—	—	—	
Ryan Kesler	United States	C	2003–2014	655	182	211	393	594	57	12	26	38	71	Selke Trophy – 2011
Ian Kidd	United States	D	1987–1989	20	4	7	11	25	—	—	—	—	—	
Jason King	Canada	LW	2002–2004	55	12	11	23	8	1	0	0	0	0	
Mark Kirton	Canada	C	1982–1985	119	23	14	37	27	4	1	2	3	7	
Trent Klatt	United States	RW	1998–2003	313	51	60	111	87	8	5	4	9	2	
Joe Kocur	Canada	RW	1995–1996	7	0	1	1	19	1	0	0	0	0	
Zenith Komarniski	Canada	D	1999–2003	19	1	1	2	10	—	—	—	—	—	
Jerry Korab	Canada	D	1973–1974	31	4	7	11	64	—	—	—	—	—	
Don Kozak	Canada	LW	1978–1979	28	2	5	7	30	3	1	0	1	0	
Lukas Krajicek	Czech Republic	D	2006–2008	117	5	22	27	100	12	0	2	2	12	
Vitali Kravtsov	Russia	RW	2022–2023	16	1	1	2	4	—	—	—	—	—	
Jason Krog	Canada	C	2008–2009	4	1	0	1	2	—	—	—	—	—	
Robert Kron	Czechoslovakia; Czech Republic	C	1990–1993	144	24	33	57	37	11	1	2	3	2	
Vladimir Krutov	Soviet Union	LW	1989–1990	61	11	23	34	20	—	—	—	—	—	
Frantisek Kucera	Czech Republic	D	1995–1997	26	1	0	1	10	6	0	1	1	0	
Kirill Kudryavtsev*	Russia	D	2024–2026	5	0	2	2	0	—	—	—	—	—	
Stu Kulak	Canada	RW	1982–1987	32	2	2	4	37	—	—	—	—	—	
Orland Kurtenbach	Canada	C	1970–1974	229	62	101	163	200	—	—	—	—	—	Captain, 1970–1974
Justin Kurtz	Canada	D	2001–2002	27	3	5	8	14	—	—	—	—	—	
Tom Kurvers	United States	D	1990–1991	32	4	23	27	20	6	2	2	4	12	
Andrei Kuzmenko	Russia	RW	2022–2024	124	47	48	95	14	—	—	—	—	—	
Joseph LaBate*	United States	C	2016–2017; 2025–2026	14	0	0	0	21	—	—	—	—	—	
Scott Lachance	United States	D	2000–2002	157	4	21	25	96	8	1	2	3	6	
Nathan LaFayette	Canada	C	1993–1995	38	5	5	10	6	20	2	7	9	4	
Sam Lafferty	United States	C/LW	2023–2024	79	13	11	24	32	11	0	0	0	2	
Kellan Lain	Canada	C	2013–2014	9	1	0	1	21	—	—	—	—	—	
Bobby Lalonde	Canada	C	1971–1977	353	72	117	189	185	6	0	0	0	2	
Juho Lammikko	Finland	D	2021–2022	75	7	8	15	14	—	—	—	—	—	
Mike Lampman	Canada	LW	1973–1974	14	1	0	1	0	—	—	—	—	—	
Darren Langdon	Canada	LW	2002–2003	45	0	1	1	143	—	—	—	—	—	
Jean-Marc Lanthier	Canada	RW	1983–1988	105	16	16	32	29	—	—	—	—	—	
Rick Lanz	Canada	D	1980–1987	417	56	171	227	331	14	2	5	7	6	
Maxim Lapierre	Canada	C	2010–2013	149	14	16	30	183	34	3	3	6	88	
Igor Larionov^{†}	Soviet Union; Russia	C	1989–1992	210	51	92	143	88	19	4	7	11	10	HHOF — 2008
Philip Larsen	Denmark	D	2016–2017	26	1	5	6	4	—	—	—	—	—	
Paul Lawless	Canada	LW	1987–1988	13	0	1	1	0	—	—	—	—	—	
Curtis Lazar	Canada	C	2022–2023	45	3	2	5	14	—	—	—	—	—	
John LeBlanc	Canada	LW	1986–1988	43	13	10	23	18	—	—	—	—	—	
Grant Ledyard	Canada	D	1997–1998	49	2	13	15	14	—	—	—	—	—	
Brad Leeb	Canada	RW	1999–2002	4	0	0	0	2	—	—	—	—	—	
Gary Leeman	Canada	RW	1994–1995	10	2	0	2	0	—	—	—	—	—	
Brendan Leipsic	Canada	LW	2017–2019	31	5	9	14	12	—	—	—	—	—	
Josh Leivo	Canada	LW	2018–2020	85	17	20	37	29	—	—	—	—	—	
Jonathan Lekkerimaki*	Sweden	RW	2024–2026	37	5	4	9	2	—	—	—	—	—	
Moe Lemay	Canada	LW	1981–1987	279	70	92	162	367	4	0	0	0	12	
Richard Lemieux	Canada	C	1971–1974	192	29	61	90	68	—	—	—	—	—	
Tim Lenardon	Canada	C	1989–1990	8	1	0	1	4	—	—	—	—	—	
Trevor Letowski	Canada	RW	2001–2003	120	18	24	42	51	12	0	2	2	8	
Don Lever	Canada	LW	1972–1980	593	186	221	407	354	10	2	2	4	6	Captain, 1977–1979
Craig Levie	Canada	D	1986–1987	9	0	1	1	13	—	—	—	—	—	
Doug Lidster	Canada	D	1983–1993	666	65	242	307	526	41	2	10	12	36	Captain, 1990–1991
Kole Lind	Canada	RW	2020–2021	7	0	0	0	0	—	—	—	—	—	
Trevor Linden^{†}	Canada	C	1988–1998; 2001–2008	1,141	318	415	732	730	118	34	61	95	90	Captain, 1990–1997; King Clancy Trophy — 1997; NHL Foundation Award — 2008^{2} Ret — #16
Lars Lindgren	Sweden	D	1978–1984	335	23	99	122	292	25	3	6	9	14	
Mats Lindgren	Sweden	C	2002–2003	54	5	9	14	18	—	—	—	—	—	
Elias Lindholm	Sweden	C	2023–2024	26	6	6	12	4	13	5	5	10	4	
Will Lockwood	Canada	RW	2020–2023	28	0	1	1	11	—	—	—	—	—	
Dave Logan	Canada	D	1979–1981	40	1	5	6	122	4	0	0	0	14	
Brian Loney	Canada	RW	1995–1996	12	2	3	5	6	—	—	—	—	—	
Dave Lowry	Canada	LW	1985–1988	165	19	21	40	357	3	0	0	0	0	
Brad Lukowich	Canada	D	2009–2010	13	1	1	2	4	—	—	—	—	—	
Jyrki Lumme	Finland	D	1989–1998	579	83	238	321	379	72	9	31	40	36	
Len Lunde	Canada	LW	1970–1971	20	1	3	4	2	—	—	—	—	—	
Gary Lupul	Canada	LW	1979–1986	293	70	75	145	243	25	4	7	11	13	
Al MacAdam	Canada	RW	1984–1985	80	14	20	34	27	—	—	—	—	—	
Blair MacDonald	Canada	RW	1980–1983	88	26	28	54	32	8	0	3	3	2	
Brett MacDonald	Canada	D	1987–1988	1	0	0	0	0	—	—	—	—	—	
Mackenzie MacEachern*	United States	LW	2025–2026	8	1	3	4	12	—	—	—	—	—	
Zack MacEwen	Canada	LW	2018–2021	55	6	3	9	69	6	0	0	0	9	
Jim Mair	Canada	D	1972–1975	23	2	4	6	8	—	—	—	—	—	
Wayne Maki	Canada	LW	1970–1973	180	50	73	123	148	—	—	—	—	—	
Manny Malhotra	Canada	C	2010–2013	159	18	30	48	36	11	0	0	0	0	
Marek Malik	Czech Republic	D	2002–2004	147	10	27	37	97	21	1	1	2	20	NHL Plus-Minus Award — 2004^{3}
Dean Malkoc	Canada	D	1995–1996	41	0	2	2	136	—	—	—	—	—	
Mark Mancari	Canada	RW	2011–2012	6	0	0	0	0	—	—	—	—	—	
Victor Mancini*	United States	D	2024–2026	40	1	5	6	15	—	—	—	—	—	
Kris Manery	Canada	LW	1979–1980	21	2	1	3	15	—	—	—	—	—	
Bob Manno	Canada	LW	1976–1981	163	13	55	68	115	10	1	1	2	12	
Mario Marois	Canada	D	1980–1981	50	4	12	16	115	—	—	—	—	—	
Grant Martin	Canada	C	1983–1985	24	0	3	3	45	—	—	—	—	—	
Pit Martin	Canada	C	1977–1979	131	27	45	72	60	3	0	1	1	2	
Shawn Matthias	Canada	C	2013–2015	96	21	13	34	28	6	1	1	2	10	
Brad Maxwell	Canada	D	1986–1987	30	1	7	8	28	—	—	—	—	—	
Brad May	Canada	LW	1997–2000; 2002–2004	225	29	27	56	380	20	1	0	1	21	
Jay Mazur	Canada	RW	1988–1992	47	11	7	18	20	6	0	1	1	8	
Chris McAllister	Canada	D	1997–1999	64	2	3	5	169	—	—	—	—	—	
Andrew McBain	Canada	RW	1989–1992	45	5	10	15	54	—	—	—	—	—	
Bryan McCabe	Canada	D	1997–1999	95	8	25	33	184	—	—	—	—	—	
Jared McCann	Canada	C	2015–2016	69	9	9	18	32	—	—	—	—	—	
Steve McCarthy	Canada	D	2005–2006	51	2	4	6	43	—	—	—	—	—	
Dennis McCord	Canada	D	1973–1974	3	0	0	0	6	—	—	—	—	—	
Joe McDonnell	Canada	D	1981–1982	7	0	1	1	12	—	—	—	—	—	
Aidan McDonough	United States	LW	2022–2023	6	1	0	1	2	—	—	—	—	—	
Evan McEneny	Canada	D	2016–2017	1	0	0	0	0	—	—	—	—	—	
Jack McIlhargey	Canada	D	1976–1980	167	6	18	24	403	3	0	0	0	2	
John McIntyre	Canada	D	1993–1995	90	3	10	13	75	24	0	1	1	16	
Nathan McIver	Canada	D	2006–2008	18	0	0	0	59	—	—	—	—	—	
Brandon McMillan	Canada	LW	2014–2015	8	0	1	1	0	2	1	0	1	4	
Peter McNab	Canada	LW	1983–1985	88	24	31	55	20	3	0	0	0	0	
Bryan McSheffrey	Canada	LW	1972–1974	87	13	7	20	44	—	—	—	—	—	
Cole McWard	United States	D	2022–2024	6	1	0	1	0	—	—	—	—	—	
Gerry Meehan	Canada	LW	1974–1975	57	10	15	25	4	—	—	—	—	—	
Jayson Megna	United States	RW	2016–2018	59	4	4	8	6	—	—	—	—	—	
Larry Melnyk	Canada	D	1987–1990	190	5	16	21	246	4	0	0	0	2	
Mark Messier^{†}	Canada	C	1997–2000	207	52	110	162	121	—	—	—	—	—	Captain, 1997–2000; HHOF — 2007
Marc Michaelis	Germany	LW	2020–2021	15	0	0	0	2	—	—	—	—	—	
Ilya Mikheyev	Russia	RW	2022–2024	124	24	35	59	6	11	0	0	0	0	
Aaron Miller	United States	D	2007–2008	57	1	8	9	32	—	—	—	—	—	
J. T. Miller	United States	C	2019–2025	404	152	285	437	292	30	9	21	30	22	
Gerry Minor	Canada	C	1979–1984	140	11	21	32	176	12	1	3	4	25	
Willie Mitchell	Canada	D	2006–2010	246	10	48	58	233	22	0	3	3	34	
Alexander Mogilny	Russia	RW	1995–2000	312	139	169	308	144	6	1	8	9	8	
Tomas Mojzis	Czech Republic	D	2005–2006	7	0	1	1	12	—	—	—	—	—	
Lars Molin	Sweden	LW	1981–1984	172	33	65	98	37	19	2	9	11	7	
Griffen Molino	United States	C	2016–2017	5	0	0	0	0	—	—	—	—	—	
Sergio Momesso	Canada	LW	1990–1995	269	68	73	141	655	66	9	13	22	157	
Garry Monahan	Canada	C	1974–1978	287	58	82	140	166	7	1	0	1	4	
Brad Moran	Canada	C	2006–2007	3	0	1	1	2	—	—	—	—	—	
Stephane Morin	Canada	C	1992–1994	6	1	2	3	6	—	—	—	—	—	
Brendan Morrison	Canada	C	1999–2008	543	136	257	393	326	49	8	19	27	48	
Dave Morrison	Canada	LW	1984–1985	8	0	0	0	0	0	0	19	27	48	
Tyler Motte	United States	C	2017–2022	196	28	22	50	60	17	4	1	5	2	
Bill Muckalt	Canada	LW	1998–2000	106	20	28	48	115	—	—	—	—	—	
Ty Mueller*	Canada	C	2024–2026	8	1	0	1	4	—	—	—	—	—	
Rob Murphy	Canada	C	1987–1992	73	6	4	10	100	4	0	0	0	2	
Bob Murray	Canada	D	1974–1977	90	3	10	13	42	6	0	1	1	13	
Dana Murzyn	Canada	D	1990–1999	452	23	66	89	900	40	3	4	7	92	
Tyler Myers*	Canada	D	2019–2026	488	26	112	138	433	22	0	1	1	30	
Evgeny Namestnikov	Russia	D	1993–1997	35	0	8	8	18	2	0	0	0	2	
Markus Naslund^{†}	Sweden	LW	1995–2008	884	346	410	756	614	45	13	20	33	46	Captain, 2000–2008; Lester Pearson Award — 2003; Ret — #19
Petr Nedved	Czechoslovakia; Czech Republic	LW	1990–1993	222	63	61	124	152	28	3	8	11	18	
Cam Neely^{†}	Canada	RW	1983–1986	201	51	53	104	320	4	2	0	2	2	HHOF — 2005
Sergei Nemchinov	Russia	C	1996–1997	6	2	3	5	4	—	—	—	—	—	
Jim Nill	Canada	RW	1981–1984	124	17	23	40	219	20	4	3	7	73	
Brian Noonan	United States	RW	1996–1998	98	14	23	37	68	—	—	—	—	—	
Robert Nordmark	Sweden	D	1988–1991	169	10	52	62	194	7	3	2	5	8	
Lawrence Nycholat	Canada	D	2008–2009	14	0	1	1	6	—	—	—	—	—	
Shane O'Brien	Canada	D	2008–2010	141	2	16	18	275	22	2	3	5	49	
Drew O'Connor*	United States	F	2024–2026	113	21	17	38	65	—	—	—	—	—	
Gerry O'Flaherty	United States	RW	1972–1978	435	98	95	193	166	7	2	2	4	6	
Paul O'Neil	United States	C	1973–1974	5	0	0	0	0	—	—	—	—	—	
Chris O'Sullivan	United States	D	1999–2000	11	0	5	5	2	—	—	—	—	—	
Evan Oberg	Canada	C	2010–2011	4	0	0	0	0	—	—	—	—	—	
Chris Oddleifson	Canada	RW	1973–1981	469	85	180	265	439	14	1	6	7	8	Captain, 1976–1977
Gino Odjick	Canada	LW	1990–1998	444	46	52	98	2,127	29	3	1	4	95	
Liam Ohgren*	Sweden	LW	2025–2026	51	8	10	18	2	—	—	—	—	—	
Mattias Ohlund	Sweden	D	1997–2009	770	93	232	325	756	53	9	19	28	55	
Roman Oksiuta	Russia	RW	1994–1996	68	21	25	46	44	10	2	3	5	0	
Victor Oreskovich	Canada	RW	2010–2012	17	0	3	3	15	19	0	0	0	12	
Michel Ouellet	Canada	RW	2008–2009	3	0	0	0	0	—	—	—	—	—	
Samuel Pahlsson	Sweden	C	2011–2012	19	2	4	6	12	5	1	0	1	4	
Rosaire Paiement	Canada	C	1970–1972	147	44	47	91	269	—	—	—	—	—	
Ryan Parent	Canada	D	2010–2011	4	0	0	0	0	—	—	—	—	—	
Richard Park	United States	C	2005–2006	60	8	10	18	29	—	—	—	—	—	
Tanner Pearson	Canada	LW	2018–2023	221	55	59	114	108	17	4	4	8	4	
Michael Peca	Canada	C	1993–1995	37	6	6	12	32	5	0	1	1	8	
Andrey Pedan	Russia	D	2015–2016	13	0	0	0	18	—	—	—	—	—	
Barry Pederson	Canada	C	1986–1990	233	60	137	197	174	—	—	—	—	—	
Denis Pederson	Canada	C	1999–2002	102	8	15	23	98	4	0	1	1	4	
Lane Pederson	Canada	C	2022–2023	11	1	2	3	15	—	—	—	—	—	
Pascal Pelletier	Canada	RW	2013–2014	3	0	0	0	0	—	—	—	—	—	
Joel Perrault	Canada	C	2010–2011	7	0	0	0	0	—	—	—	—	—	
Nic Petan	Canada	C	2021–2022	11	0	2	2	4	—	—	—	—	—	
Brent Peterson	Canada	RW	1985–1987	146	15	38	53	171	3	2	0	2	9	
Michel Petit	Canada	D	1982–1988	226	24	57	81	373	1	0	0	0	0	
Elias Pettersson*	Sweden	C	2018–2026	545	200	308	508	108	30	8	16	24	2	
Elias Pettersson*	Sweden	D	2024–2026	98	4	9	13	56	—	—	—	—	—	
Marcus Pettersson*	Sweden	D	2024–2026	113	4	25	29	80	—	—	—	—	—	
Matt Pettinger	Canada	LW	2007–2008; 2009–2010	29	5	4	9	17	1	0	0	0	0	
Steve Pinizzotto	Canada	RW	2012–2013	12	0	0	0	29	1	0	0	0	0	
Adrien Plavsic	Canada	D	1989–1995	182	13	52	65	147	13	1	7	8	4	
Vasily Podkolzin	Russia	RW	2021–2024	137	18	17	35	43	2	0	0	0	10	
Tucker Poolman	United States	D	2021–2023	43	1	3	4	12	—	—	—	—	—	
Poul Popiel	Canada	D	1970–1972	116	11	23	34	97	—	—	—	—	—	
Derrick Pouliot	Canada	D	2017–2019	133	6	28	34	69	—	—	—	—	—	
Tracy Pratt	United States	D	1973–1976	176	9	30	39	261	5	0	0	0	5	
Kevin Primeau	Canada	C	1980–1981	2	0	0	0	4	—	—	—	—	—	
Sean Pronger	Canada	C	2003–2004	3	0	1	1	4	—	—	—	—	—	
Brandon Prust	Canada	LW	2015–2016	35	1	6	7	59	—	—	—	—	—	
Taylor Pyatt	Canada	RW	2006–2009	224	49	44	93	145	16	2	4	6	8	
Dan Quinn	Canada	C	1989–1991	101	34	49	83	73	—	—	—	—	—	Captain, 1990–1991
Pat Quinn	Canada	D	1970–1972	133	4	14	18	212	—	—	—	—	—	
Brogan Rafferty	United States	D	2018–2019; 2020–2021	3	0	1	1	0	—	—	—	—	—	
Jack Rathbone	United States	D	2020–2023	28	2	3	5	4	—	—	—	—	—	
Dan Ratushny	Canada	D	1992–1993	1	1	1	1	2	—	—	—	—	—	
Aatu Raty*	Finland	C	2022–2026	102	11	15	26	36	—	—	—	—	—	
Mason Raymond	Canada	RW	2007–2013	374	80	98	178	118	55	8	10	18	14	
Marc Reaume	Canada	D	1970–1972	27	0	2	2	4	—	—	—	—	—	
Lukas Reichel*	Germany	LW	2025–2026	14	0	1	1	4	—	—	—	—	—	
Brandon Reid	Canada	C	2002–2007	13	2	4	6	0	10	0	2	2	0	
Paul Reinhart	Canada	D	1988–1990	131	24	90	114	74	7	2	3	5	4	
Sheldon Rempal	Canada	RW	2021–2022	1	0	0	0	0	—	—	—	—	—	
Borna Rendulic	Croatia	RW	2016–2017	1	0	0	0	0	—	—	—	—	—	
Brad Richardson	Canada	C	2013–2015; 2021–2022	135	21	27	48	81	5	0	0	0	15	
Glen Richardson	Canada	LW	1975–1976	24	3	6	9	19	—	—	—	—	—	
Dave Richter	Canada	D	1986–1988	127	4	19	23	396	—	—	—	—	—	
Mike Ridley	Canada	C	1995–1997	112	26	47	73	71	5	0	0	0	2	
Byron Ritchie	Canada	C	2007–2008	72	3	8	11	80	—	—	—	—	—	
Garth Rizzuto	Canada	C	1970–1971	37	3	4	7	16	—	—	—	—	—	
David Roberts	United States	LW	1996–1998	71	11	18	29	55	—	—	—	—	—	
Bert Robertsson	Sweden	D	1997–1999	69	4	6	10	37	—	—	—	—	—	
Mike Robitaille	Canada	D	1974–1977	174	10	50	60	121	7	0	1	1	4	
Leon Rochefort	Canada	C	1974–1976	87	18	14	32	2	5	0	2	2	0	
Anton Rodin	Sweden	RW	2016–2017	3	0	1	1	0	—	—	—	—	—	
Jeff Rohlicek	United States	C	1987–1989	9	0	0	0	8	—	—	—	—	—	
Leif Rohlin	Sweden	D	1995–1997	96	8	24	32	40	5	0	0	0	0	
Aaron Rome	Canada	D	2009–2012	148	5	14	19	123	16	1	0	1	37	
Cliff Ronning	Canada	C	1990–1996	366	112	216	328	183	72	24	34	58	48	
Marco Rossi*	Austria	C	2025–2026	33	8	14	22	8	—	—	—	—	—	
Darcy Rota	Canada	LW	1979–1984	289	120	116	236	453	30	10	5	15	82	
Antoine Roussel	France	LW	2018–2021	141	17	31	48	198	17	2	2	4	46	
Derek Roy	Canada	C	2012–2013	12	3	3	6	2	4	0	1	1	0	
Martin Rucinsky	Czech Republic	LW	2003–2004	13	1	2	3	10	7	1	1	2	6	
Christian Ruuttu	Finland	C	1994–1995	25	5	6	11	23	9	1	1	2	0	
Jarkko Ruutu	Finland	RW	1999–2006	267	23	28	51	453	24	1	3	4	32	
Prestin Ryan	Canada	D	2005–2006	1	0	0	0	2	—	—	—	—	—	
Rick Rypien	Canada	C	2005–2011	119	9	7	16	226	17	0	3	3	47	
Sami Salo	Finland	D	2002–2012	566	74	162	236	202	74	9	17	26	14	
Mikael Samuelsson	Sweden	RW	2009–2012	155	49	57	106	106	23	9	9	18	24	
Derek Sanderson	Canada	C	1976–1977	16	7	9	16	7	—	—	—	—	—	
Geoff Sanderson	Canada	LW	1997–1998; 2003–2004	22	3	7	10	8	7	1	1	2	4	
Jim Sandlak	Canada	RW	1985–1993; 1995–1996	509	104	117	221	789	33	7	10	17	30	
Tommi Santala	Finland	C	2006–2007	30	1	5	6	24	1	0	0	0	0	
Mike Santorelli	Canada	C	2013–2014	49	10	18	28	6	—	—	—	—	—	
Max Sasson*	United States	F	2024–2026	95	16	10	26	26	—	—	—	—	—	
David Saunders	Canada	LW	1987–1988	56	7	13	20	10	—	—	—	—	—	
Ashton Sautner	Canada	D	2017–2020	23	0	3	3	4	—	—	—	—	—	
Yann Sauve	Canada	D	2010–2011; 2013–2014	8	0	0	0	0	—	—	—	—	—	
Luca Sbisa	Switzerland	D	2014–2017	199	7	25	32	112	6	1	1	2	7	
Dave Scatchard	Canada	C	1997–2000	179	26	28	54	329	—	—	—	—	—	
Peter Schaefer	Canada	LW	1998–2001; 2010–2011	194	37	40	77	52	3	0	0	0	0	
Tim Schaller	United States	LW	2018–2020	98	8	8	16	23	—	—	—	—	—	
John Schella	Canada	D	1970–1972	115	2	18	20	224	—	—	—	—	—	
Luke Schenn	Canada	D	2018–2019; 2021–2023	139	8	32	40	141	—	—	—	—	—	
Andy Schliebener	Canada	D	1981–1985	84	2	11	13	74	6	0	0	0	0	
Bobby Schmautz	Canada	RW	1970–1974; 1980–1981	285	108	104	212	428	3	0	0	0	0	
Nate Schmidt	United States	D	2020–2021	54	5	10	15	4	—	—	—	—	—	
Mathieu Schneider	United States	D	2009–2010	17	2	3	5	12	—	—	—	—	—	
Jordan Schroeder	United States	C	2012–2014	56	6	9	15	6	—	—	—	—	—	
Jesse Schultz	Canada	RW	2006–2007	2	0	0	0	0	—	—	—	—	—	
Daniel Sedin	Sweden	LW	2000–2018	1,306	393	648	1,041	546	102	25	46	71	78	Art Ross Trophy – 2011; Ted Lindsay Award – 2011; Ret — #22; HHOF — 2022
Henrik Sedin	Sweden	C	2000–2018	1,330	240	830	1,070	680	105	23	55	78	58	Art Ross Trophy – 2010; Hart Memorial Trophy – 2010; Captain, 2010–2018; Ret — #33; HHOF — 2022
Ron Sedlbauer	Canada	LW	1974–1980	325	108	69	177	170	10	0	1	1	19	
Danny Seguin	Canada	LW	1970–1974	26	1	5	6	46	—	—	—	—	—	
Alexander Semak	Russia	C	1996–1997	18	2	1	3	2	—	—	—	—	—	
Anatoli Semenov	Russia	C	1992–1993	62	10	34	44	28	12	1	3	4	0	
Tom Sestito	United States	LW	2012–2015	103	6	5	11	273	1	0	0	0	2	
Ryan Shannon	United States	C	2007–2008	27	5	8	13	24	—	—	—	—	—	
Vadim Sharifijanov	Russia	LW	1999–2000	17	2	1	3	14	—	—	—	—	—	
Kiefer Sherwood*	United States	RW	2024–2026	122	36	27	63	57	—	—	—	—	—	
Hunter Shinkaruk	Canada	C	2015–2016	1	0	0	0	0	—	—	—	—	—	
Sergei Shirokov	Russia	LW	2009–2011	8	1	0	1	2	—	—	—	—	—	
Drew Shore	United States	C	2016–2017	14	0	2	2	4	—	—	—	—	—	
Mike Sillinger	Canada	C	1995–1998	138	28	32	60	65	6	0	0	0	2	
Jack Skille	United States	RW	2016–2017	55	5	4	9	12	—	—	—	—	—	
Petri Skriko	Finland	LW	1984–1991	472	171	202	373	221	10	1	5	6	0	
Jiri Slegr	Czechoslovakia; Czech Republic	D	1992–1995; 2003–2004	154	12	65	77	235	5	0	3	3	4	
Darryl Sly	Canada	D	1970–1971	31	0	2	2	10	—	—	—	—	—	
Brad Smith	Canada	LW	1978–1980	21	1	3	4	52	—	—	—	—	—	
Doug Smith	Canada	C	1988–1990	40	6	8	14	76	4	0	0	0	6	
Nathan Smith	Canada	C	2003–2007	4	0	0	0	0	4	0	0	0	0	
Bryan Smolinski	United States	C	2006–2007	20	4	3	7	8	12	2	2	4	8	
Stan Smyl^{†}	Canada	RW	1978–1991	896	262	411	673	1,556	41	16	17	33	64	Captain, 1982–1990; Ret — #12
Harold Snepsts	Canada	D	1974–1984; 1988–1990	781	35	160	195	1,446	44	1	9	10	99	
Gene Sobchuk	Canada	LW	1973–1974	1	0	0	0	0	—	—	—	—	—	
Brent Sopel	Canada	D	1998–2004; 2006–2007	322	33	97	130	139	42	2	9	11	10	
Carson Soucy	Canada	D	2023–2025	99	5	11	16	54	12	1	4	5	6	
Fred Speck	Canada	C	1971–1972	18	1	2	3	0	—	—	—	—	—	
Ryan Spooner	Canada	C	2018–2019	11	0	4	4	0	—	—	—	—	—	
Daniel Sprong	Netherlands	RW	2024–2025	9	1	2	3	2	—	—	—	—	—	
Andy Spruce	Canada	LW	1976–1977	51	9	6	15	37	—	—	—	—	—	
Steve Staios	Canada	D	1996–1999	143	3	12	15	208	—	—	—	—	—	
Daryl Stanley	Canada	D	1987–1990	100	6	9	15	192	—	—	—	—	—	
Ryan Stanton	Canada	D	2013–2015	119	4	23	27	69	—	—	—	—	—	
Mike Stapleton	Canada	C	2000–2001	18	1	2	3	8	—	—	—	—	—	
Troy Stecher	Canada	D	2016–2020	286	11	64	75	124	17	2	1	3	10	
Ronnie Stern	Canada	RW	1987–1991	97	5	6	11	480	3	0	1	1	17	
Mike Stevens	Canada	LW	1984–1985	6	0	3	3	6	—	—	—	—	—	
Ralph Stewart	Canada	C	1970–1971; 1976–1978	53	8	12	20	4	—	—	—	—	—	
Ron Stewart	Canada	C	1971–1972	42	3	1	4	10	—	—	—	—	—	
Riley Stillman	Canada	D	2022–2023	32	0	5	5	23	—	—	—	—	—	
Alek Stojanov	Canada	RW	1994–1996	62	0	1	1	136	5	0	0	0	2	
Steve Stone	Canada	RW	1973–1974	2	0	0	0	0	—	—	—	—	—	
Jason Strudwick	Canada	D	1997–2002	243	4	15	19	367	2	0	0	0	0	
Jack Studnicka	Canada	C	2022–2024	52	5	4	9	12	—	—	—	—	—	
Marco Sturm	Germany	LW	2011–2012	6	0	0	0	2	—	—	—	—	—	
Alexander Sulzer	Germany	D	2011–2012	12	0	1	1	2	—	—	—	—	—	
Raimo Summanen	Finland	LW	1986–1988	19	6	7	13	2	—	—	—	—	—	
Mats Sundin^{†}	Sweden	C	2008–2009	41	9	19	28	28	8	3	5	8	2	HHOF — 2012
Patrik Sundstrom	Sweden	LW	1982–1987	374	133	209	342	181	11	1	1	2	9	
Pius Suter	Switzerland	F	2023–2025	148	39	36	75	34	13	2	1	3	6	
Brandon Sutter	United States	C	2015–2021	275	54	50	104	55	17	1	5	6	4	
Rich Sutter	Canada	RW	1986–1990	291	61	61	122	533	7	2	1	3	12	
Bill Sweatt	United States	LW	2011–2013	3	0	0	0	0	—	—	—	—	—	
Lee Sweatt	United States	D	2010–2011	3	1	1	2	2	—	—	—	—	—	
Dale Tallon	Canada	D	1970–1973	222	44	93	137	219	—	—	—	—	—	
Jeff Tambellini	Canada	LW	2010–2011	62	9	8	17	18	6	0	0	0	2	
Steve Tambellini	Canada	C	1985–1988	161	42	45	87	34	—	—	—	—	—	
Christopher Tanev	Canada	D	2010–2020	514	22	96	118	121	33	1	9	10	4	
Don Tannahill	Canada	RW	1972–1974	111	30	33	63	25	—	—	—	—	—	
Tony Tanti	Canada	RW	1982–1990	531	250	220	470	489	18	1	9	10	15	
Ted Taylor	Canada	LW	1970–1972	125	20	29	49	141	—	—	—	—	—	
Josh Teves	Canada	D	2018–2019	1	0	0	0	0	—	—	—	—	—	
Alexei Tezikov	Russia	D	2001–2002	2	0	0	0	2	—	—	—	—	—	
Esa Tikkanen	Canada	LW	1995–1997	100	25	39	64	80	6	3	2	5	2	
Tyler Toffoli	Canada	RW	2019–2020	10	6	4	10	4	7	2	2	4	0	
Raffi Torres	Canada	LW	2010–2011	80	14	15	29	78	23	3	4	7	28	
Yannick Tremblay	Canada	D	2006–2007	12	1	2	3	12	—	—	—	—	—	
Nikita Tryamkin	Russia	D	2015–2017	79	3	8	11	74	—	—	—	—	—	
Rob Tudor	Canada	C	1978–1980	26	4	4	8	19	3	0	0	0	0	
Ossi Vaananen	Finland	C	2008–2009	3	0	1	1	2	3	0	0	0	2	
Lubomir Vaic	Slovakia	C	1997–2000	9	1	1	2	2	—	—	—	—	—	
Rick Vaive	Canada	LW	1979–1980	47	13	8	21	111	—	—	—	—	—	
Garry Valk	Canada	LW	1990–1993	172	24	35	59	200	16	0	1	1	37	
Thomas Vanek	Austria	LW	2017–2018	61	17	24	41	28	—	—	—	—	—	
Herberts Vasiļjevs	Latvia	C	2001–2002	18	3	2	5	2	—	—	—	—	—	
Dennis Ververgaert	Canada	RW	1973–1979	409	139	165	304	177	3	1	0	1	4	
Jimmy Vesey	United States	LW	2020–2021	20	0	3	3	6	—	—	—	—	—	
Linden Vey	Canada	RW	2014–2016	116	14	25	39	24	1	0	0	0	0	
Sid Veysey	Canada	C	1977–1978	1	0	0	0	0	—	—	—	—	—	
Claude Vilgrain	Canada	RW	1987–1988	6	1	1	2	0	—	—	—	—	—	
Jake Virtanen	Canada	RW	2015–2021	317	55	45	100	219	16	2	1	3	25	
Aaron Volpatti	Canada	LW	2010–2013	54	3	1	4	81	—	—	—	—	—	
Radim Vrbata	Czech Republic	RW	2014–2016	142	44	46	90	32	6	2	2	4	0	
Scott Walker	Canada	RW	1994–1998	197	10	34	44	466	—	—	—	—	—	
Ryan Walter	Canada	C	1991–1993	92	9	11	20	59	13	0	3	3	8	
Mike Walton	Canada	C	1975–1978	115	44	69	113	71	2	0	0	0	5	
Dixon Ward	Canada	RW	1992–1994	103	28	31	59	119	9	2	3	5	0	
Ron Ward	Canada	D	1971–1972	71	2	4	6	4	—	—	—	—	—	
Todd Warriner	Canada	LW	2001–2003	44	6	10	16	34	6	1	0	1	2	
Steve Washburn	Canada	C	1998–1999	8	0	0	0	2	—	—	—	—	—	
Mike Weaver	Canada	D	2007–2008	55	0	1	1	33	—	—	—	—	—	
Yannick Weber	Switzerland	D	2013–2016	159	17	21	38	70	6	0	0	0	12	
Eric Weinrich	United States	D	2005–2006	16	0	0	0	8	—	—	—	—	—	
Dale Weise	Canada	RW	2011–2014	152	10	16	26	166	6	0	0	0	4	
Kyle Wellwood	Canada	C	2008–2010	149	32	20	52	16	22	3	10	13	0	
Jeremy Welsh	Canada	C	2013–2014	19	1	0	1	6	—	—	—	—	—	
Doug Wickenheiser	Canada	C	1987–1988	80	7	19	26	36	—	—	—	—	—	
Barry Wilcox	Canada	LW	1972–1975	33	3	2	5	15	—	—	—	—	—	
Jim Wiley	Canada	C	1975–1977	36	4	6	10	6	—	—	—	—	—	
Barry Wilkins	Canada	D	1970–1975	256	21	69	90	458	—	—	—	—	—	Scored the first goal in franchise history.
Tom Willander*	Sweden	D	2025–2026	70	5	16	21	28	—	—	—	—	—	
Tiger Williams	Canada	LW	1979–1984	312	83	82	165	1,324	31	4	10	14	181	
Jim Wiste	Canada	C	1970–1971	23	1	2	3	0	—	—	—	—	—	
Christian Wolanin	Canada	D	2022–2023	16	0	3	3	4	—	—	—	—	—	
Dan Woodley	United States	C	1987–1988	5	2	0	2	17	—	—	—	—	—	
Mark Wotton	Canada	D	1994–1998	42	3	6	9	25	5	0	0	0	4	
John Wright	Canada	C	1972–1974	91	13	30	43	43	—	—	—	—	—	
Harry York	Canada	C	1998–2000	103	11	22	33	40	—	—	—	—	—	
Howie Young	Canada	D	1970–1971	11	0	2	2	25	—	—	—	—	—	
Nikita Zadorov	Russia	D	2023–2024	54	5	9	14	102	13	4	4	8	26	
Mike Zalewski	United States	LW	2013–2014; 2015–2017	6	0	2	2	2	—	—	—	—	—	
Lars Zetterstrom	Sweden	D	1978–1979	14	0	1	1	2	—	—	—	—	—	
Peter Zezel	Canada	C	1997–1999	66	11	20	31	18	—	—	—	—	—	

== Notes ==
=== Statistical notes ===
a: As of the 2005–2006 NHL season, all games will have a winner, teams losing in overtime and shootouts are awarded one point thus the OTL stat replacees the tie statistic. The OTL column also includes SOL (Shootout losses).
b: Save percentage did not become an official NHL statistic until the 1982–83 season. Therefore, goaltenders who played before 1982 do not have official save percentages.

=== Player notes ===
^1Beginning in the 2005–06 season, ties are no longer possible. At the same time, the league began tracking overtime losses for goaltenders.
^2Trevor Linden shared the NHL Foundation Player Award with Vincent Lecavalier of the Tampa Bay Lightning.
^3Marek Malik shared the NHL Plus-Minus Award with Martin St. Louis of the Tampa Bay Lightning after both players had a plus/minus of +35.
