= Buffalo Norsemen =

- City: North Tonawanda, New York
- League: North American Hockey League
- Division: West
- Operated: 1975—1976
- Home arena: Tonawanda Sports Center
- Colors: White, Green, Gold
- Owners: Dr. Dudley Turecki & Peter Gambino
- General manager: Willie Marshall
- Head coach: Guy Trottier
- Captain: Steve Atkinson

The Buffalo Norsemen played in the old North American Hockey League (NAHL) during the 1975–76 season, playing their home games in North Tonawanda, New York, a suburb of Buffalo 12 miles to the north, at the Tonawanda Sports Center.

An incident at a Norsemen playoff game that season was portrayed in the movie Slap Shot. A regular season game in the film between the Charlestown Chiefs and the Peterborough Patriots is based on a real game between the Norsemen and the Johnstown Jets, the team that the Charlestown Chiefs were based on, during the NAHL playoffs. The Norsemen uniform design and colours appear in the film as the Hyannisport Presidents, and the Patriots have similar uniforms to the Syracuse Blazers of the NAHL. The film used similar uniforms as the teams in the NAHL but rearranged the storylines.

In the film, the Hanson Brothers start a brawl with the Patriots during the pre-game skate. The real-life incident occurred in Johnstown with the Jets leading the playoff series 3 games to 2. Steve, Jeff and Jack Carlson, three brothers who Slapshot's Hanson brothers were based on, started a brawl with the Norsemen during the pre-game skate in retaliation for Norsemen fans bigoted actions towards an African-American player on the Johnstown roster at the previous three games in the series, which had been played in North Tonawanda. In an ugly incident, a number of Norsemen fans had hurled racial epithets at the player, and some held up derogatory signs, including one stating that blacks should be playing basketball, not hockey. After the brawl in Johnstown had been broken up by the officials, the Norsemen players and coaches returned to the dressing room and refused to come out to start the game. According to the Johnstown Jets' Dave Hanson, who the Slap Shot character of Dave "Killer" Carlson was based on, "they (the Norsemen) skated off the ice and went into the locker room and refused to come out to play the game, and we won the game and the series by forfeit."

In a twist of fate, in the subsequent years Buffalo's NHL franchise, the Buffalo Sabres, would make two historic black player signings: winger Tony McKegney, one of the first black players to have a prolonged career in the NHL, and enforcer Val James, the NHL's first black American. Both James and McKegney, the latter of whom was quite popular with Sabres fans, played their home games in front of many of the same fans who had attended Buffalo Norsemen games. McKegney had no complaints about his treatment in Buffalo, stating that Western New York's fans treated him "royally."

== NHL alumni ==
The following Buffalo Norsemen players also played in the National Hockey League:

- Steve Atkinson
- Les Binkley
- Larry Gould
- Willie Marshall
- Bryan McSheffrey
- Lou Nistico
- Claude Noel
- Pat Rupp
- Ron Snell
- Jim Stanfield
- Dave Tataryn
- Guy Trottier
