= Dave Tataryn =

Canadian ice hockey player

- Born: July 17, 1950 (age 74); Sudbury, Ontario, Canada
- Height: 5 ft 9 in (175 cm)
- Weight: 160 lb (73 kg; 11 st 6 lb)
- Position: Goaltender
- Caught: Left
- Played for: New York Rangers; Toronto Toros
- NHL draft: 104th overall, 1970; St. Louis Blues
- Playing career: 1975–1984

David Nathan Tataryn (born July 17, 1950) is a Canadian retired professional ice hockey goaltender. He played 25 games in the World Hockey Association with the Toronto Toros during the 1975–76 season and 2 games in the National Hockey League with the New York Rangers during the 1976–77 season. The rest of his career, which lasted from 1975 to 1984, was mainly spent in senior leagues.

== Career statistics ==
=== Regular season and playoffs ===
			Regular season									Playoffs
Season	Team	League	GP	W	L	T	MIN	GA	SO	GAA	SV%	GP	W	L	MIN	GA	SO	GAA	SV%
1967–68	Niagara Falls Flyers	OHA	5	—	—	—	300	16	0	3.55	—	—	—	—	—	—	—	—	—
1967–68	Niagara Falls Flyers	M-Cup	—	—	—	—	—	—	—	—	—	1	0	0	2	0	0	0.00	1.000
1968–69	Niagara Falls Flyers	OHA	49	—	—	—	2940	197	2	4.04	—	14	—	—	820	67	0	4.88	—
1969–70	Niagara Falls Flyers	OHA	38	—	—	—	2280	223	0	5.87	—	—	—	—	—	—	—	—	—
1971–72	University of Toronto	CIAU	12	—	—	—	720	21	0	1.75	—	—	—	—	—	—	—	—	—
1972–73	Laurentian University	CIAU	16	—	—	—	960	63	0	3.94	—	—	—	—	—	—	—	—	—
1973–74	Laurentian University	CIAU	17	—	—	—	1020	66	0	3.88	—	—	—	—	—	—	—	—	—
1974–75	Laurentian University	CIAU	14	—	—	—	800	48	0	3.60	—	—	—	—	—	—	—	—	—
1975–76	Toronto Toros	WHA	23	7	12	1	1261	100	0	4.76	.873	—	—	—	—	—	—	—	—
1975–76	Columbus Owls	IHL	4	—	—	—	183	14	0	4.59	—	—	—	—	—	—	—	—	—
1975–76	Buffalo Norsemen	NAHL	2	2	0	0	120	7	0	3.50	—	—	—	—	—	—	—	—	—
1975–76	Whitby Warriors	OHA Sr	2	2	0	0	120	4	0	2.00	—	—	—	—	—	—	—	—	—
1976–77	New York Rangers	NHL	2	1	1	0	80	10	0	7.50	.767	—	—	—	—	—	—	—	—
1976–77	Mohawk Valley Comets	NAHL	1	0	1	0	60	7	0	7.00	—	—	—	—	—	—	—	—	—
1976–77	New Haven Nighthawks	AHL	3	2	1	0	179	11	0	3.69	—	—	—	—	—	—	—	—	—
1976–77	Charlotte Checkers	SHL	39	—	—	—	2284	114	1	2.99	—	—	—	—	—	—	—	—	—
1977–78	Cambridge Hornets	OHA Sr	20	—	—	—	1250	73	1	3.50	—	—	—	—	—	—	—	—	—
1978–79	Cambridge Hornets	OHA Sr	20	—	—	—	1240	81	0	3.92	—	—	—	—	—	—	—	—	—
1979–80	Cambridge Hornets	OHA Sr	28	—	—	—	1637	88	1	3.23	—	—	—	—	—	—	—	—	—
1980–81	Cambridge Hornets	OHA Sr	27	—	—	—	1598	94	1	3.53	—	—	—	—	—	—	—	—	—
1981–82	Cambridge Hornets	OHA Sr	—	—	—	—	—	—	—	—	—	—	—	—	—	—	—	—	—
1982–83	Cambridge Hornets	OHA Sr	—	—	—	—	—	—	—	—	—	—	—	—	—	—	—	—	—
1983–84	Cambridge Hornets	OHA Sr	—	—	—	—	—	—	—	—	—	—	—	—	—	—	—	—	—
WHA totals			23	7	12	1	1261	100	0	4.76	.873	—	—	—	—	—	—	—	—
NHL totals			2	1	1	0	80	10	0	7.50	.767	—	—	—	—	—	—	—	—
