= Willie Marshall (ice hockey) =

Canadian ice hockey player (1930-2023)

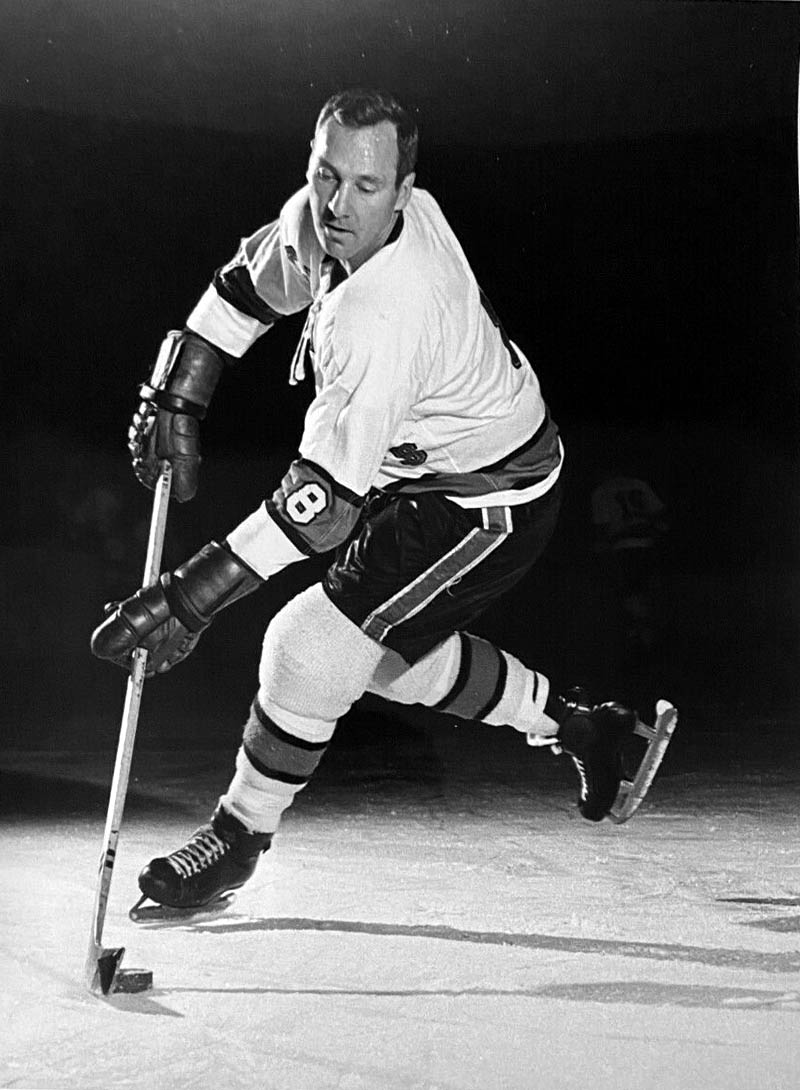
- Marshall c. 1960s with the Baltimore Clippers
- Born: December 1, 1930 Kirkland Lake, Ontario, Canada
- Died: June 2, 2023 (aged 92) Lebanon, Pennsylvania, U.S.
- Height: 5 ft 10 in (178 cm)
- Weight: 165 lb (75 kg; 11 st 11 lb)
- Position: Centre
- Shot: Left
- Played for: NHL; Toronto Maple Leafs; AHL; Pittsburgh Hornets; Hershey Bears; Rochester Americans; Providence Reds; Baltimore Clippers; IHL; Toledo Hornets; NAHL; Buffalo Norsemen
- Playing career: 1952–1972

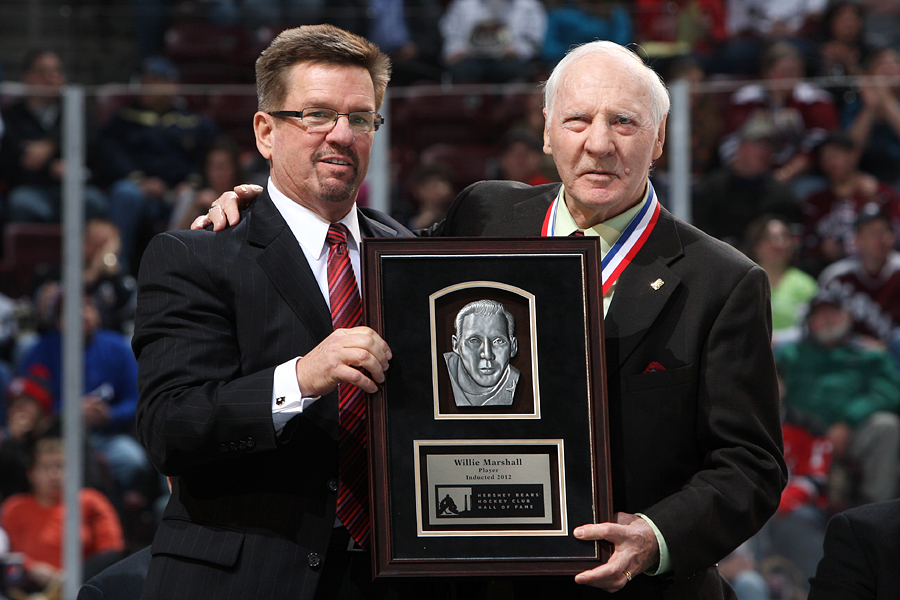
Marshall (right) being inducted into the Hershey Bears Hall of Fame in 2012

Wilmott J. Marshall (December 1, 1930 – June 2, 2023) was a Canadian ice hockey forward. Marshall holds the record for most goals, points, assists, hat tricks, and games played in the American Hockey League (AHL), which he achieved over a 20-season career.

Marshall also played with the Toronto Maple Leafs in the National Hockey League for four seasons between 1953 and 1958.

The Willie Marshall Award, which is awarded to the AHL's leading goal scorer, is named after him.

== Hockey career ==
Marshall made his professional debut with the AHL's Pittsburgh Hornets in 1952–53, recording 66 points in 62 games and leading the team to the Calder Cup Finals.

Marshall was voted a First Team AHL All-Star twice, first in 1955–56 and again in 1957–58, when he won the AHL scoring title with a career-best 104 points in 68 games. He was also selected as a Second Team All-Star in 1961–62.

Marshall won the Calder Cup with Pittsburgh in 1955, and with Hershey in 1958 and 1959. He ranks second in AHL history with 119 career playoff points over 112 postseason games.

Marshall played for the Providence Reds in 1963, then moved to the Baltimore Clippers from 1966–71. He finished his career with the Rochester Americans in 1971–72. He was the league's all-time leader in games played (1,205), goals (523), assists (852), points (1,375) and hat tricks (25).

Marshall had 570 points in 439 games with the Hershey Bears and is sixth on their all-time scoring list. His number 16 was retired by the club.

The American Hockey League presents the Willie Marshall Award annually in honour of the AHL player who scores the most goals that season. Marshall was named to the AHL Hall of Fame in 2006.

== Personal life and death ==
In his later years, Marshall became an avid author who self-published numerous volumes of Christian poetry and several nonfiction works on Christian history, theology, and doctrine. He later lived in Lebanon, Pennsylvania.

Marshall died at his home in Lebanon, Pennsylvania on June 2, 2023, at the age of 92.

== Awards and honours ==
- Calder Cup champion (1955, 1958, 1959)
- AHL First All-Star Team (1956, 1958)
- AHL Second All-Star Team (1962)
- John B. Sollenberger Trophy (1958)
- AHL Hall of Fame (2006)
- Hershey Bears Hall of Fame (2012)

== Career statistics ==
=== Regular season and playoffs ===
			Regular season					Playoffs
Season	Team	League	GP	G	A	Pts	PIM	GP	G	A	Pts	PIM
1948–49	Toronto St. Michael's Majors	OHA	32	13	18	31	14	—	—	—	—	—
1949–50	Toronto St. Michael's Majors	OHA	48	39	27	66	32	5	6	1	7	10
1950–51	Toronto St. Michael's Majors	OHA	43	29	30	59	20	6	1	1	2	2
1950–51	Guelph Biltmores	OHA	4	4	3	7	2	—	—	—	—	—
1951–52	Charlottetown Islanders	MMHL	84	50	44	94	89	—	—	—	—	—
1952–53	Pittsburgh Hornets	AHL	62	27	39	66	58	10	1	8	9	13
1952–53	Toronto Maple Leafs	NHL	2	0	0	0	0	—	—	—	—	—
1953–54	Pittsburgh Hornets	AHL	61	28	45	73	41	5	1	4	5	2
1954–55	Pittsburgh Hornets	AHL	46	23	25	48	37	10	9	7	16	6
1954–55	Toronto Maple Leafs	NHL	16	1	4	5	0	—	—	—	—	—
1955–56	Pittsburgh Hornets	AHL	58	45	52	97	47	4	2	1	3	0
1955–56	Toronto Maple Leafs	NHL	6	0	0	0	0	—	—	—	—	—
1956–57	Hershey Bears	AHL	64	35	59	94	18	7	3	7	10	4
1957–58	Hershey Bears	AHL	68	40	64	104	56	11	10	9	19	6
1958–59	Rochester Americans	AHL	19	7	16	23	6	—	—	—	—	—
1958–59	Hershey Bears	AHL	37	22	16	38	4	9	5	2	7	0
1958–59	Toronto Maple Leafs	NHL	9	0	1	1	2	—	—	—	—	—
1959–60	Hershey Bears	AHL	72	38	40	78	99	—	—	—	—	—
1960–61	Hershey Bears	AHL	56	25	44	69	36	7	3	5	8	2
1961–62	Hershey Bears	AHL	70	30	65	95	24	7	0	6	6	0
1962–63	Hershey Bears	AHL	72	36	56	92	12	15	3	7	10	10
1963–64	Providence Reds	AHL	72	33	50	83	18	3	2	3	5	0
1964–65	Providence Reds	AHL	69	12	44	56	12	—	—	—	—	—
1965–66	Providence Reds	AHL	70	13	27	40	8	—	—	—	—	—
1966–67	Baltimore Clippers	AHL	68	33	56	89	22	9	6	7	13	0
1967–68	Baltimore Clippers	AHL	51	24	41	65	2	—	—	—	—	—
1968–69	Baltimore Clippers	AHL	74	26	52	78	18	4	1	2	3	0
1969–70	Baltimore Clippers	AHL	42	9	19	28	0	5	2	2	4	0
1970–71	Baltimore Clippers	AHL	64	15	40	55	0	6	0	1	1	0
1971–72	Toledo Hornets	IHL	46	15	32	47	2	—	—	—	—	—
1971–72	Rochester Americans	AHL	10	2	2	4	2	—	—	—	—	—
1975–76	Buffalo Norsemen	NAHL	1	0	0	0	0	—	—	—	—	—
AHL totals			1205	523	852	1375	520	111	48	71	119	43
NHL totals			33	1	5	6	2	—	—	—	—	—
