= Larry Gould (ice hockey) =

Canadian ice hockey player

- Born: August 16, 1952 (age 72); Alliston, Ontario, Canada
- Height: 5 ft 9 in (175 cm)
- Weight: 195 lb (88 kg; 13 st 13 lb)
- Position: Left wing
- Shot: Left
- Played for: Vancouver Canucks
- NHL draft: Undrafted
- Playing career: 1972–1982

Larry Stephen Gould (born August 16, 1952) is a Canadian former professional ice hockey player who played two games in the National Hockey League (NHL) for the Vancouver Canucks, with most of his professional career being in the minor International Hockey League.

== Playing career ==
Gould started his professional career in 1972 with the Des Moines Capitols of the International Hockey League (IHL). He spent one season there before moving to the Seattle Totems of the Western Hockey League (WHL). His two games with the Canucks game in January 1974. His debut was against the California Golden Seals on January 11, and he played the next night against the New York Rangers before returning to the Totems for the rest of the season. His older brother John was a member of the Canucks at the time. The WHL folded in 1974, and Seattle joined the Central Hockey League, and Gould played one season there, followed by one with the Buffalo Norsemen of the North American Hockey League before returning to the IHL in 1976, joining the Port Huron Flags. He spent five seasons with Port Huron and a final year in the IHL split between the Muskegon Mohawks and Flint Generals before retiring in 1982. Gould’s number 10 was retired by the Port Huron Flags in a ceremony surrounded by family and friends.

== Personal life ==
Gould's brother, John Gould, also played hockey and played over 500 games in the NHL. Larry married Cynthia Brown in 1986; the couple resided in Port Huron, Michigan. A town that bordered Gould’s home country of Canada. The two were married for 38 years.Having one son (Cory) in 1987.

== Career statistics ==
=== Regular season and playoffs ===
			Regular season					Playoffs
Season	Team	League	GP	G	A	Pts	PIM	GP	G	A	Pts	PIM
1969–70	Hamilton Red Wings	OHA	49	21	19	40	81	—	—	—	—	—
1970–71	Hamilton Red Wings	OHA	50	21	16	37	73	—	—	—	—	—
1971–72	Niagara Falls Flyers	OHA	61	14	20	34	92	6	2	1	3	30
1972–73	Des Moines Capitols	IHL	73	30	54	84	89	3	2	1	3	0
1973–74	Seattle Totems	WHL	53	17	32	49	49	—	—	—	—	—
1973–74	Vancouver Canucks	NHL	2	0	0	0	0	—	—	—	—	—
1974–75	Seattle Totems	CHL	72	21	41	62	49	—	—	—	—	—
1975–76	Buffalo Norsemen	NAHL	71	32	68	100	22	4	2	5	7	2
1976–77	Port Huron Flags	IHL	74	35	71	106	37	—	—	—	—	—
1977–78	Port Huron Flags	IHL	80	36	69	105	86	17	12	12	24	4
1978–79	Port Huron Flags	IHL	59	30	36	66	32	—	—	—	—	—
1979–80	Port Huron Flags	IHL	75	25	57	82	35	11	3	12	15	4
1980–81	Port Huron Flags	IHL	71	30	63	93	51	4	1	1	2	0
1981–82	Muskegon Mohawks	IHL	15	2	15	17	2	—	—	—	—	—
1981–82	Flint Generals	IHL	59	31	45	76	22	4	2	2	4	2
IHL totals			506	219	410	629	354	39	20	28	48	10
NHL totals			2	0	0	0	0	—	—	—	—	—
