= John Gould (ice hockey) =

Canadian ice hockey player

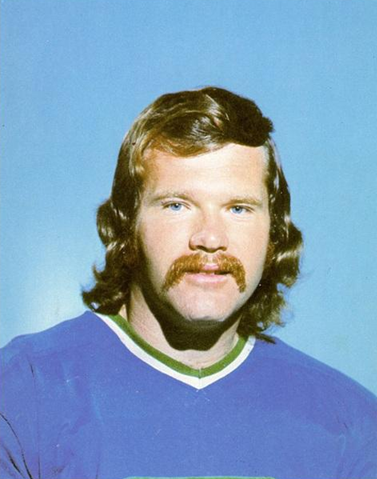
- Born: April 11, 1949 (age 77) Alliston, Ontario, Canada
- Height: 5 ft 11 in (180 cm)
- Weight: 175 lb (79 kg; 12 st 7 lb)
- Position: Left wing
- Shot: left
- Played for: Buffalo Sabres; Vancouver Canucks; Atlanta Flames
- NHL draft: Undrafted
- Playing career: 1969–1980

John Milton Gould (born April 11, 1949) is a Canadian former professional ice hockey winger who played 504 NHL games for the Buffalo Sabres, Vancouver Canucks, and Atlanta Flames between 1971 and 1980. Gould had back-to-back 30-goal seasons with the Canucks (1974-75, 1975-76), becoming the first Canuck with multiple 30-goal seasons in franchise history. He is the older brother of Larry Gould.

== Career statistics ==
=== Regular season and playoffs ===
			Regular season					Playoffs
Season	Team	League	GP	G	A	Pts	PIM	GP	G	A	Pts	PIM
1967–68	London Nationals	OHA	54	19	27	46	14	5	1	2	3	13
1968–69	London Knights	OHA	49	30	44	74	20	6	1	3	4	0
1969–70	Charlotte Checkers	EHL	69	25	48	73	18	11	10	6	16	6
1969–70	Tulsa Oilers	CHL	—	—	—	—	—	3	1	0	1	0
1970–71	Charlotte Checkers	EHL	72	48	52	100	50	13	10	8	18	6
1971–72	Cincinnati Swords	AHL	73	26	15	41	34	10	4	6	10	6
1971–72	Buffalo Sabres	NHL	2	1	0	1	0	—	—	—	—	—
1972–73	Cincinnati Swords	AHL	56	30	42	72	71	15	10	6	16	9
1972–73	Buffalo Sabres	NHL	8	0	1	1	0	—	—	—	—	—
1973–74	Buffalo Sabres	NHL	30	4	2	6	2	—	—	—	—	—
1973–74	Vancouver Canucks	NHL	45	9	10	19	8	—	—	—	—	—
1974–75	Vancouver Canucks	NHL	78	34	31	65	27	5	2	2	4	0
1975–76	Vancouver Canucks	NHL	70	32	27	59	16	2	1	0	1	0
1976–77	Vancouver Canucks	NHL	25	7	8	15	2	—	—	—	—	—
1976–77	Atlanta Flames	NHL	54	8	15	23	8	3	0	0	0	2
1977–78	Atlanta Flames	NHL	79	19	28	47	21	2	0	0	0	2
1978–79	Atlanta Flames	NHL	61	8	7	15	18	2	0	0	0	0
1979–80	Buffalo Sabres	NHL	52	9	9	18	11	—	—	—	—	—
1979–80	Rochester Americans	AHL	13	6	5	11	6	4	0	1	1	2
NHL totals			504	131	138	269	113	14	3	2	5	4
