= Emile Francis =

Canadian ice hockey player, coach and general manager (1926–2022)

- Hockey Hall of Fame, 1982 (Builder)
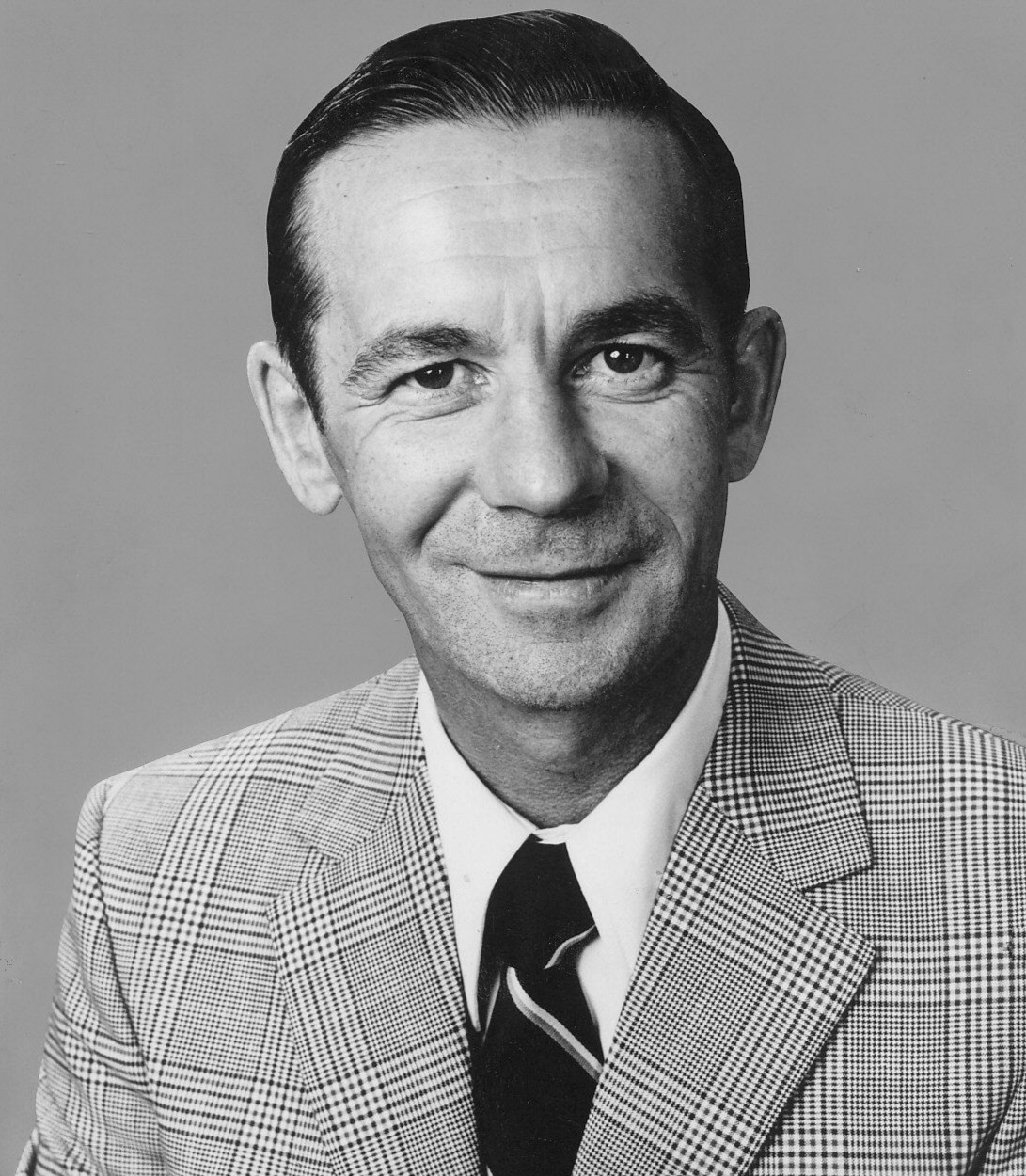
- Francis with the New York Rangers, 1973
- Born: September 13, 1926 North Battleford, Saskatchewan, Canada
- Died: February 19, 2022 (aged 95) West Palm Beach, Florida, United States
- Height: 5 ft 7 in (170 cm)
- Weight: 155 lb (70 kg; 11 st 1 lb)
- Position: Goaltender
- Caught: Left
- Played for: Chicago Black Hawks; New York Rangers
- Coached for: New York Rangers; St. Louis Blues
- Playing career: 1943–1960
- Coaching career: 1965–1983

Emile Percival Francis (September 13, 1926 – February 19, 2022), nicknamed "the Cat", was a Canadian ice hockey player, coach, and general manager in the National Hockey League (NHL). He played for the Chicago Black Hawks and New York Rangers from 1946 to 1952. After playing minor league hockey until 1960, he became the Rangers' assistant general manager in 1962 and later general manager of the Rangers, St. Louis Blues and Hartford Whalers from 1964 to 1989. Francis led the Rangers to nine consecutive playoff appearances (1967–75), but could not help deliver a Stanley Cup championship in five decades as a player, coach, and executive.

== Early life ==
Francis was born in North Battleford, Saskatchewan, on September 13, 1926. He was raised by his mother, Yvonne Francis, after his father died when he was eight years old. One of his uncles taught him how to play ice hockey. Francis enlisted in the Canadian military when he was 16, and enrolled in non-commissioned officers' school, with the option to attend the Royal Military College of Canada in Kingston, Ontario. However, as the Second World War just ended, he decided to return to hockey and went to Moose Jaw, Saskatchewan instead. Francis also played baseball as a youth and would manage a team in North Battleford. He later recalled he accepted the position as he felt it "would give [him] more experience as far as handling people went, and all that."

== Playing career ==
Francis began his professional career in 1943–44 with the Philadelphia Falcons of the Eastern Hockey League. He later acquired his nickname "the Cat" while playing for the Moose Jaw Canucks of the Saskatchewan Junior Hockey League during the 1945–46 season, when a sportswriter described him as "quick as a cat". During the autumn of 1946, he was given an invitation to participate in the training camp of the Chicago Black Hawks – the sponsor club of the Canucks – held in Regina. In the middle of the 1946–47 season, he was called up to play in the National Hockey League (NHL) for the Black Hawks. He led the league in losses (30) and goals against (183) the following year. He ultimately played 73 games with the franchise over those two seasons. His unique use of a catching mitt based upon the design of a baseball first baseman's glove drew the attention of league officials. Francis argued that the popular gloves of the time put too much strain on the hands of goalkeepers, and, after gaining executive approval, equipment based on Francis's glove became commonplace.

In October 1948, Francis was traded with Alex Kaleta to the New York Rangers in exchange for Jim Henry. Over the next four years, he would play sparingly in a relief role for the Rangers, while playing mostly on New York's American Hockey League affiliate. He finished his career in the Western Hockey League, including stints with the Vancouver Canucks, Saskatoon Quakers, and Seattle Americans. Francis retired from playing after the 1959–60 season.

== Coaching and executive career ==
Upon retiring in 1960, Francis was initially asked to coach in Moose Jaw; however, without a firm agreement in place, he declined the offer. Sought after for his leadership skills, he instead joined the Rangers organization; offered a choice to coach their senior affiliate in Trois Rivieres, Quebec or junior team in Guelph, Ontario, he chose Guelph and became the coach of the Ontario Hockey Association's Guelph Royals. Two years later, he was summoned to the Rangers and became assistant general manager, and in 1964, he took over as general manager, and then a year later assumed the coaching position as well. Although he coached a struggling team during his first season, Francis would remain behind the bench for ten seasons (except for brief moves to a solely front office position in 1968 and 1973), making the playoffs each year and leading his team to a loss in the 1972 Stanley Cup Finals. However, his decision on October 31, 1975, to release Eddie Giacomin, who was popular with Rangers fans – drew their ire. When Giacomin returned to Madison Square Garden two days later as a Detroit Red Wings player, some fans chanted "Kill the Cat".

After being fired by the Rangers in January 1976, Francis joined the St. Louis Blues as general manager and executive vice president, and accepted a 10% ownership stake in the team. When NHL president Clarence Campbell announced he would retire in the mid-1970s, Francis was touted as a potential successor (John Ziegler ultimately replaced Campbell in 1977). He was instrumental in finding a local owner for the financially troubled franchise in the early 1980s, and he also returned to the bench for two separate head coaching stints. In 1983, Francis took a position with the Hartford Whalers, serving as general manager until 1988 and team president from 1988 until 1993.

== Later life ==
In retirement, Francis supported junior hockey in the New York and St. Louis markets. He was inducted into the Hockey Hall of Fame in 1982 under the builders category. He was conferred the Lester Patrick Trophy that same year, in recognition of his contributions to hockey in the United States. He later received the Wayne Gretzky International Award in 2015.

== Personal life ==
Francis met his wife Emma while in Saskatchewan, where she was studying to become a nurse. They were married for 68 years, until she died in 2020. Together, they had two sons: Bobby and Rick. Bobby was head coach of the Phoenix Coyotes and won the Jack Adams Award in 2002. Rick was the vice president of marketing and sales for the Whalers. In September 2007, Emma was reported missing after dropping Emile off at the Palm Beach International Airport for a flight to New Jersey. Neighbors reported not seeing Emma return home after driving to the airport. She was later found safe in a local hotel several days later.

Francis died on February 19, 2022, at the age of 95.

== Career statistics ==
=== Regular season and playoffs ===
			Regular season								Playoffs
Season	Team	League	GP	W	L	T	Min	GA	SO	GAA	GP	W	L	T	Min	GA	SO	GAA
1941–42	North Battleford Beavers	SJHL-N	4	0	4	0	240	34	0	8.50	—	—	—	—	—	—	—	—
1942–43	North Battleford Beavers	SJHL-N	—	—	—	—	—	—	—	—	—	—	—	—	—	—	—	—
1943–44	Philadelphia Falcons	EAHL	14	—	—	—	840	78	0	5.57	—	—	—	—	—	—	—	—
1944–45	Washington Lions	EAHL	36	—	—	—	2160	243	0	6.75	8	1	6	1	479	57	0	7.12
1945–46	Moose Jaw Canucks	SJHL-S	18	18	0	0	1080	55	0	3.06	4	4	0	0	240	8	1	2.00
1945–46	Regina Capitals	WCSHL	1	—	—	—	60	5	0	5.00	—	—	—	—	—	—	—	—
1945–46	Moose Jaw Canucks	M-Cup	—	—	—	—	—	—	—	—	8	4	4	0	480	38	0	4.75
1946–47	Chicago Black Hawks	NHL	19	6	12	1	1140	104	0	5.47	—	—	—	—	—	—	—	—
1946–47	Regina Capitals	WCSHL	32	—	—	—	1920	148	0	4.63	—	—	—	—	—	—	—	—
1947–48	Chicago Black Hawks	NHL	54	19	30	5	3240	183	1	3.39	—	—	—	—	—	—	—	—
1947–48	Kansas City Pla-Mors	USHL	7	3	2	2	420	24	1	3.42	—	—	—	—	—	—	—	—
1948–49	New York Rangers	NHL	2	2	0	0	120	4	0	2.00	—	—	—	—	—	—	—	—
1948–49	New Haven Ramblers	AHL	49	15	27	7	2940	203	4	4.14	—	—	—	—	—	—	—	—
1949–50	New York Rangers	NHL	1	0	1	0	60	8	0	8.00	—	—	—	—	—	—	—	—
1949–50	New Haven Ramblers	AHL	68	22	36	10	4080	246	1	3.62	—	—	—	—	—	—	—	—
1950–51	New York Rangers	NHL	5	1	2	1	260	14	0	3.23	—	—	—	—	—	—	—	—
1950–51	Cincinnati Mohawks	AHL	53	20	26	7	3280	167	2	3.05	6	3	3	—	360	18	0	3.00
1951–52	New York Rangers	NHL	14	4	7	3	840	41	0	2.93	—	—	—	—	—	—	—	—
1951–52	Cincinnati Mohawks	AHL	51	24	22	5	3160	162	4	3.08	—	—	—	—	—	—	—	—
1952–53	Vancouver Canucks	WHL	70	32	28	10	4200	216	5	3.08	9	4	5	—	550	30	0	3.27
1953–54	Cleveland Barons	AHL	65	37	28	0	3900	204	5	3.14	9	7	2	—	540	28	0	3.11
1954–55	Cleveland Barons	AHL	57	28	26	3	3420	204	2	3.58	3	1	2	—	158	12	0	4.56
1955–56	Saskatoon Quakers	WHL	68	27	33	8	4185	239	5	3.43	3	0	3	—	180	17	0	5.67
1956–57	Seattle Americans	WHL	68	35	27	6	4167	214	4	3.08	6	2	4	—	358	20	0	3.35
1957–58	Vancouver Canucks	WHL	67	18	47	2	4040	294	2	4.37	—	—	—	—	—	—	—	—
1958–59	Spokane Spokes	WHL	68	25	37	6	4150	269	1	3.89	4	1	3	—	240	16	0	4.00
1959–60	Spokane Comets	WHL	68	19	46	3	4080	300	0	4.41	—	—	—	—	—	—	—	—
1959–60	Seattle Totems	WHL	1	1	0	0	60	2	0	2.00	—	—	—	—	—	—	—	—
NHL totals			95	32	52	10	5660	354	1	3.75	—	—	—	—	—	—	—	—

- Source: Total Hockey

== Coaching record ==
Team	Year	Regular season							Post season		
Team	Year	G	W	L	T	Pts	Finish	W	L	Pct.	Result
NYR	1965–66	50	13	31	6	32	6th in NHL	—	—	—	Missed playoffs
NYR	1966–67	70	30	28	12	72	4th in NHL	0	4	.000	Lost in Semifinals (MTL)
NYR	1967–68	74	39	23	12	90	2nd in East	2	4	.333	Lost in Quarterfinals (CHI)
NYR	1968–69	33	19	8	6	42	3rd in East	0	4	.000	Lost in Quarterfinals (MTL)
NYR	1969–70	76	38	22	16	92	4th in East	2	4	.333	Lost in Quarterfinals (BOS)
NYR	1970–71	78	49	18	11	109	2nd in East	7	6	.538	Lost in Semifinals (CHI)
NYR	1971–72	78	48	17	13	109	2nd in East	10	6	.625	Lost in Stanley Cup Final (BOS)
NYR	1972–73	78	47	23	8	102	3rd in East	5	5	.500	Lost in Semifinals (CHI)
NYR	1973–74	37	22	10	5	49	3rd in East	7	6	.538	Lost in Semifinals (PHI)
NYR	1974–75	80	37	29	14	88	2nd in Patrick	1	2	.333	Lost in Preliminary round (NYI)
NYR total		654	342	209	103						9 playoff appearances
STL	1976–77	80	32	39	9	73	1st in Smythe	0	4	.000	Lost in Quarterfinals (MTL)
STL	1981–82	12	4	6	2	10	3rd in Norris	5	5	.500	Lost in Division Finals (CHI)
STL	1982–83	32	10	19	3	23	(returned to GM's position)	—	—	—	—
STL total		124	46	64	14			5	9	.357	2 playoff appearances
Total		778	388	273	117			39	50	.438	11 playoff appearances

- Source: Total Hockey

== See also ==
- List of members of the Hockey Hall of Fame
- List of National Hockey League head coaching wins and point percentage leaders
- Notable families in the NHL

Sporting positions
Preceded by Red Sullivan; Bernie Geoffrion; Larry Popein	Head coach of the New York Rangers; 1965–1968; 1969–1973; 1973–1975	Succeeded by Bernie Geoffrion; Larry Popein; Ron Stewart
Preceded by Leo Boivin; Red Berenson	Head coach of the St. Louis Blues; 1976–1977; 1982	Succeeded by Leo Boivin; Barclay Plager
Preceded by Muzz Patrick	General manager of the New York Rangers; 1964–1976	Succeeded by John Ferguson Sr
Preceded by Denis Ball	General manager of the St. Louis Blues; 1976–1983	Succeeded by Ron Caron
Preceded by Larry Pleau	General manager of the Hartford Whalers; 1983–1989	Succeeded by Eddie Johnston
