= List of St. Louis Blues general managers =

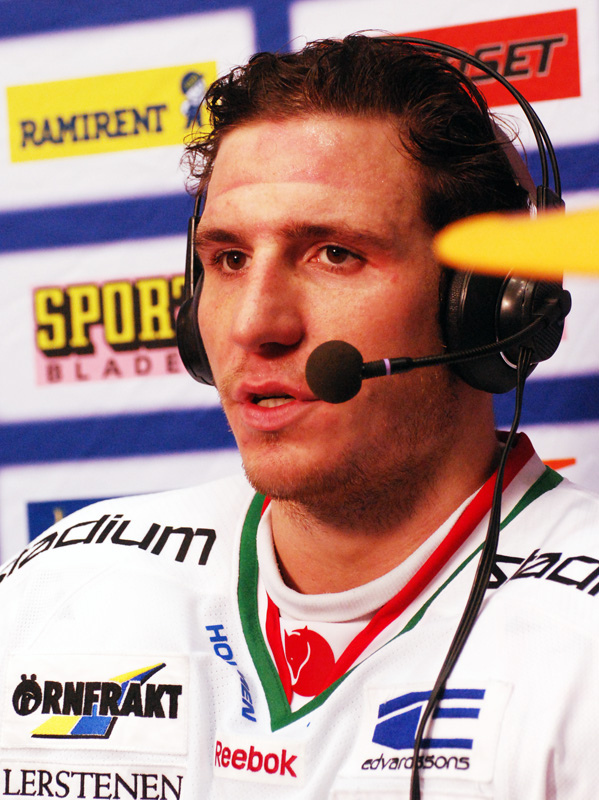
Alexander Steen is the current general manager of the St. Louis Blues.

The St. Louis Blues are an American professional ice hockey team based in St. Louis, Missouri. They play in the Central Division of the Western Conference in the National Hockey League (NHL). The team joined the NHL in 1967 as an expansion team with five other teams. The Blues first played their home games at the St. Louis Arena until 1994; they play their home games at Enterprise Center, formerly the Scottrade Center and first named the Kiel Center. The franchise has had twelve general managers since their inception.

== Key ==
Key of terms and definitions
| Term | Definition |
|---|---|
| No. | Number of general managers^{[a]} |
| Ref(s) | References |
| – | Does not apply |
| † | Elected to the Hockey Hall of Fame in the Builder category |

== General managers ==
General managers of the St. Louis Blues
| No. | Name | Tenure | Accomplishments during this term | Ref(s) |
|---|---|---|---|---|
| 1 | Lynn Patrick | May 5, 1966 – May 29, 1968 | 1 Stanley Cup Finals appearance (1968); 1 playoff appearance | |
| 2 | Scotty Bowman† | May 29, 1968 – April 30, 1971 | 2 Stanley Cup Finals appearances (1969, 1970); 2 division titles and 3 playoff appearances | |
| – | Lynn Patrick | May 7, 1971 – October 30, 1971 | | |
| 3 | Sid Abel | October 30, 1971 – April 17, 1973 | 2 playoff appearances | |
| 4 | Charles Catto | May 7, 1973 – April 7, 1974 | No playoff appearances | |
| 5 | Lou Angotti^{[b]} | April 7, 1974 – August 24, 1974 | | |
| 6 | Sid Salomon III^{[b]} | August 24, 1974 – April 12, 1976 | 2 playoff appearances | |
| 7 | Emile Francis† | April 12, 1976 – May 2, 1983 | 2 division titles and 5 playoff appearances | |
| 8 | Ron Caron | August 13, 1983 – July 17, 1994 | 2 division titles and 11 playoff appearances | |
| 9 | Mike Keenan | July 17, 1994 – December 19, 1996 | 2 playoff appearances | |
| – | Ron Caron (Interim) | December 19, 1996 – June 21, 1997 | 1 playoff appearance | |
| 10 | Larry Pleau | June 21, 1997 – July 1, 2010 | Won Presidents' Trophy (1999–2000); 1 division title and 8 playoff appearances | |
| 11 | Doug Armstrong | July 1, 2010 – June 30, 2026 | Won General Manager of the Year Award (2011–12); Won Stanley Cup (2019); 1 conference title, 3 division titles, and 11 playoff appearances | |
| 12 | Alexander Steen | June 30, 2026 – present | | |

== See also ==
- List of NHL general managers

== Notes ==
- ^{a} A running total of the number of general managers of the franchise. Thus any general manager who has two or more separate terms as general manager is only counted once. Interim general managers do not count towards the total.
- ^{b} Gerry Ehman and Denis Ball have been wrongly identified as general manager when their official title was director of player personnel, whose main duties were to be in charge of the amateur scouting and made decisions regarding the NHL draft. The error must have begun when Chuck Catto was demoted from general manager to director of player personnel on April 7, 1974. Sid Salomon III took on the title of President and Managing Director after the position of general manager was eliminated on August 24, 1974.
