= Larry Pleau =

American ice hockey player and executive (born 1947)

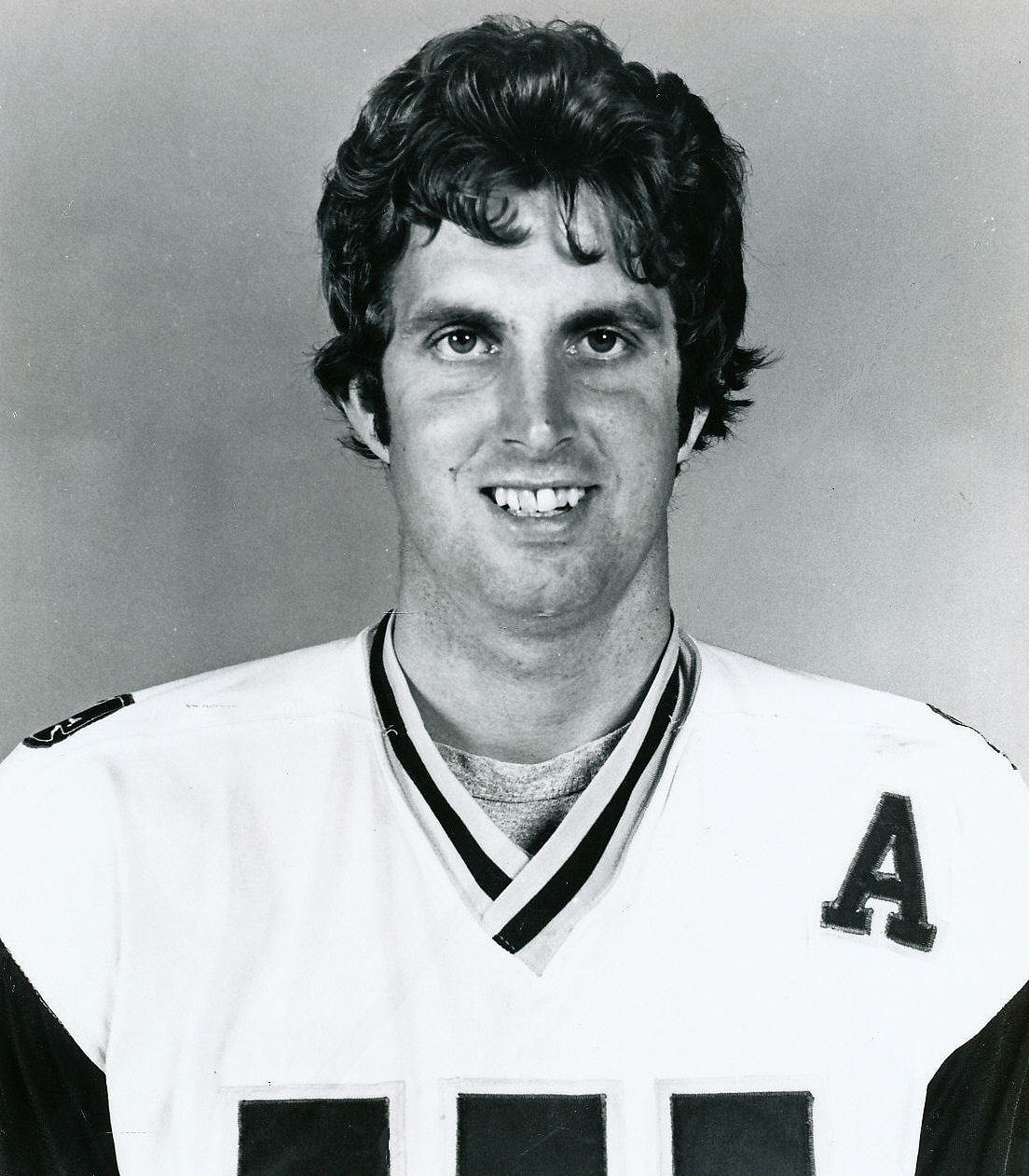
- Pleau in 1976
- Born: June 29, 1947 (age 79) Lynn, Massachusetts, U.S.
- Height: 6 ft 1 in (185 cm)
- Weight: 185 lb (84 kg; 13 st 3 lb)
- Position: Center
- Shot: Left
- Played for: Montreal Canadiens; New England Whalers
- National team: United States
- Playing career: 1968–1979

Lawrence Winslow Pleau (born June 29, 1947) is an American former ice hockey player who also was the senior advisor to the general manager for the Arizona Coyotes of the National Hockey League (NHL). He formerly served as senior vice president and General Manager of the St. Louis Blues. He played in the NHL with the Montreal Canadiens between 1970 and 1972, and in the World Hockey Association with the New England Whalers between 1972 and 1979. Internationally Pleau played for the American national team at the 1968 Winter Olympics and the 1969 World Championship.

== High school and junior career ==
Larry Pleau played for Lynn English High School Bulldogs in Lynn, Massachusetts from 1963 to 1964 before moving to Canada where he spent the next three seasons with the Montreal Junior Canadiens of the Ontario Hockey League from 1964 to 1967.

== Professional career ==
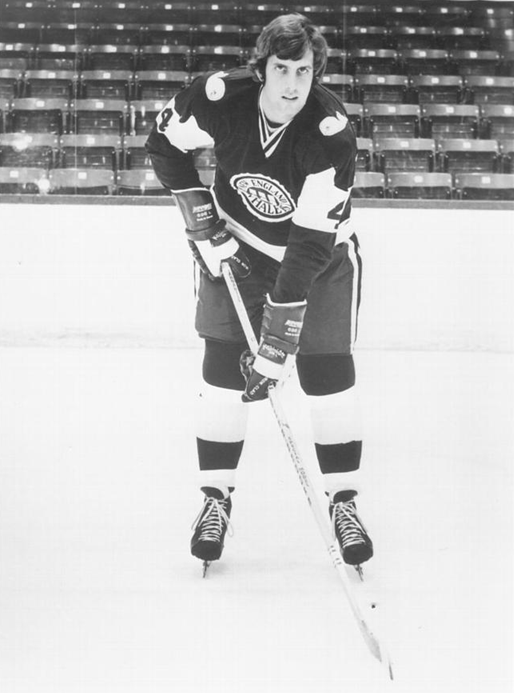
1972-73 photo of Pleau for New England Whalers

Pleau was one of the top American hockey players in the late 1960s and early 1970s, playing for the United States team at the 1968 Winter Olympics in Grenoble as well as the 1969 Ice Hockey World Championship tournament in Stockholm.

He spent the 1968–69 season with the Jersey Devils of the Eastern Hockey League, becoming the league's rookie of the year.

He then played three seasons for the Montreal Canadiens from 1970-1972. He was included on the team's championship photo and has a Stanley Cup ring, but did not play enough games to have his name engraved on the Stanley Cup.

After being selected off waivers by the Toronto Maple Leafs in the summer of 1972, he instead choose to sign a contract with his hometown New England Whalers of the upstart World Hockey Association (WHA), being the first player signed by the team. Pleau became one of the Whalers' early stars and appeared in the 1973, 1974 and 1975 WHA All Star Game as the Whalers representative. He was also a member of the United States team at the inaugural 1976 Canada Cup, although he did not appear in the tournament itself. He played seven seasons for the Whalers before retiring in 1979.

== Coaching career ==
He was the head coach of the Hartford Whalers from 1980-1983. He then coached the Binghamton Whalers of the American Hockey League from 1984–1988. He was re-hired by Hartford in 1987 and coached them until 1989.

== Front office career ==
Pleau joined the New York Rangers as assistant general manager of player development in 1989, and was later promoted to assistant general manager and director of player personnel. He stayed with the Rangers for eight years, including the Rangers' Cup-winning season in 1993–94.

He moved to the Blues in 1997 as general manager. The Rangers received winger Mike Peluso from the Blues as compensation. While Pleau presided over the Blues' winning the Presidents' Trophy in 1999–2000, the Blues steadily declined over the next few seasons, culminating in finishing dead last in the league in 2005–06, missing the playoffs for the first time in 25 years and for only the fourth time in franchise history. Following the season, the Blues were sold to Dave Checketts. Pleau kept his job as general manager, but had to give most of his powers over hockey operations to John Davidson.

Pleau was also assistant general manager of the silver medal-winning American hockey team at the 2002 Winter Olympics, and was general manager of Team USA during the 2003 and 2004 IIHF World Championships and the 2004 World Cup of Hockey.

Pleau stepped down as general manager of the St Louis Blues on July 1, 2010, with Doug Armstrong taking his place. Pleau was then named senior advisor to hockey operations, and vice president, with the Blues after 13 years as the club's general manager, the longest tenure in franchise history.

== Awards and achievements ==
- Eastern Hockey League Rookie of the Year (1969)
- 1971 Stanley Cup championship (Montreal)
- Avco World Trophy (1973)
- Played in the 1973, 1974 and 1975 WHA All Star Game
- 1987 Louis A.R. Pieri Memorial Award winner - Coach of the year (Binghamton) AHL
- 1994 Stanley Cup championship (NYR) as Assistant General Manager
- United States Hockey Hall of Fame, 2000
- Lester Patrick Award, 2002

== Career statistics ==
=== Regular season and playoffs ===
			Regular season					Playoffs
Season	Team	League	GP	G	A	Pts	PIM	GP	G	A	Pts	PIM
1963–64	Montreal NDG Monarchs	MMJHL	44	8	22	30	33	18	5	10	15	12
1963–64	Montreal NDG Monarchs	M-Cup	—	—	—	—	—	13	4	10	14	14
1964–65	Montreal Junior Canadiens	OHA	55	9	17	26	0	7	0	0	0	10
1965–66	Montreal Junior Canadiens	OHA	40	13	11	24	47	10	0	6	6	6
1966–67	Montreal Junior Canadiens	OHA	45	20	32	52	34	4	0	2	2	2
1967–68	United States National Team	Intl	—	—	—	—	—	—	—	—	—	—
1968–69	Jersey Devils	EHL	66	37	44	81	53	—	—	—	—	—
1969–70	Montreal Voyageurs	AHL	50	15	16	31	19	—	—	—	—	—
1969–70	Montreal Canadiens	NHL	20	1	0	1	0	—	—	—	—	—
1970–71	Montreal Canadiens	NHL	19	1	5	6	8	—	—	—	—	—
1971–72	Nova Scotia Voyageurs	AHL	11	7	6	13	19	—	—	—	—	—
1971–72	Montreal Canadiens	NHL	55	7	10	17	14	4	0	0	0	0
1972–73	New England Whalers	WHA	78	39	48	87	42	15	12	7	19	15
1973–74	New England Whalers	WHA	77	26	43	69	35	2	2	0	2	0
1974–75	New England Whalers	WHA	78	30	34	64	50	6	2	3	5	19
1975–76	New England Whalers	WHA	75	29	45	74	21	14	5	7	12	0
1976–77	New England Whalers	WHA	78	11	21	32	22	5	1	0	1	0
1977–78	New England Whalers	WHA	54	16	18	34	4	14	5	4	9	8
1978–79	Springfield Indians	AHL	5	1	3	4	0	—	—	—	—	—
1978–79	New England Whalers	WHA	28	6	6	12	6	10	2	1	3	0
WHA totals			468	157	215	372	180	66	29	22	51	42
NHL totals			94	9	15	24	22	4	0	0	0	0

=== International ===
Year	Team	Event	GP	G	A	Pts	PIM
1968	United States	OLY	7	2	4	6	2
1969	United States	WC	10	5	0	5	8
Senior totals			17	7	4	11	10

== NHL coaching record ==
Team	Year	Regular season						Post season
Team	Year	G	W	L	T	Pts	Finish	Result
Hartford Whalers	1980–81	20	6	12	2	14	4th in Norris	Missed playoffs
Hartford Whalers	1981–82	80	21	41	18	60	5th in Adams	Missed playoffs
Hartford Whalers	1982–83	18	4	13	1	9	5th in Adams	(interim coach)
Hartford Whalers	1987–88	26	13	13	0	26	4th in Adams	Lost in 1st Rd.
Hartford Whalers	1988–89	80	37	38	5	79	4th in Adams	Lost in 1st Rd.
Total		224	81	117	26			

Preceded by Jack Kelley	General Manager of the Hartford Whalers; 1981–83	Succeeded by Emile Francis
Preceded by Ron Caron	General Manager of the St. Louis Blues; 1997–2010	Succeeded by Doug Armstrong
Preceded by Don Blackburn; Larry Kish	Head coach of the Hartford Whalers; 1980–81; 1981–82	Succeeded by Larry Kish; John Cunniff
