= Larry Popein =

Canadian ice hockey player (1930–2020)

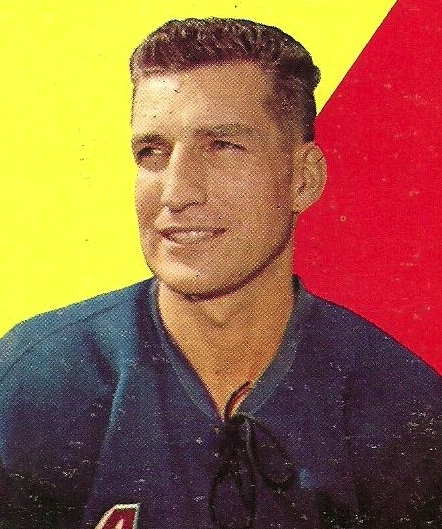
- Born: August 11, 1930 Yorkton, Saskatchewan, Canada
- Died: February 8, 2020 (aged 89) Kamloops, British Columbia, Canada
- Height: 5 ft 9 in (175 cm)
- Weight: 170 lb (77 kg; 12 st 2 lb)
- Position: Centre
- Shot: Left
- Played for: New York Rangers; Oakland Seals
- Playing career: 1949–1970

Lawrence Thomas Popein (August 11, 1930 – February 8, 2020) was a Canadian professional ice hockey player and coach.

== Playing career ==
Popein began his career with the Moose Jaw Canucks of the Saskatchewan Junior Hockey League. He then signed with the Vancouver Canucks of the Western Hockey League. During his playing time with this organization, he developed a special affinity for British Columbia's largest city.

In 1954, Popein's contract was acquired by the New York Rangers and he began his National Hockey League (NHL) career. Although a relatively small skater at 5 ft 9 in, 170 lbs, Popein developed a reputation as a stoic, fearless, hard-working player who was a solid body checker and a skilled passer. He was the quiet centre on a powerful line that included Andy Bathgate and Dean Prentice. Early in the 1960–61 season, after six years as a Rangers starter, Popein was returned to the Canucks. He briefly returned to the NHL during the 1967–68 season, as expansion allowed many veterans to crack the lineups of fledgling teams, with Popein spending one year with the Oakland Seals.

Upon retiring from the ice, Popein entered coaching. He served as the bench boss of the Omaha Knights of the Central Hockey League, then as an assistant coach with the Rangers; he briefly was the interim head coach of this club during the 1973–74 season, coaching for 41 games. He was fired on January 11, 1974, after suspending Rod Gilbert for a game due to missing a team meeting: the meeting time had been moved but Popein had not informed Gilbert, though he upheld the suspension. With this move the rest of the Rangers lost confidence in Popein, forcing him out.

The next year, Popein became director of player development of the new NHL incarnation of the Vancouver Canucks. After a clean sweep of the Vancouver front office, Popein took a job with the Calgary Flames in 1986, serving as a scout until his 1992 retirement.

In the 2009 book 100 Ranger Greats, the authors ranked Popein at No. 91 all-time of the 901 New York Rangers who had played during the team's first 82 seasons.

== Career statistics ==
=== Regular season and playoffs ===
			Regular season					Playoffs
Season	Team	League	GP	G	A	Pts	PIM	GP	G	A	Pts	PIM
1947–48	Moose Jaw Canucks	SJHL	27	21	12	33	6	4	4	0	4	7
1947–48	Moose Jaw Canucks	M-Cup	—	—	—	—	—	5	0	0	0	0
1948–49	Moose Jaw Canucks	WCJHL	26	21	12	33	34	8	5	2	7	0
1949–50	Moose Jaw Canucks	WCJHL	37	36	22	58	4	4	5	2	7	0
1950–51	Regina Capitals	WCSHL	54	21	19	40	14	—	—	—	—	—
1951–52	Vancouver Canucks	PCHL	69	32	36	68	14	—	—	—	—	—
1952–53	Vancouver Canucks	WHL	70	25	44	69	23	9	5	10	15	0
1953–54	Vancouver Canucks	WHL	70	34	32	66	22	10	4	7	11	4
1954–55	New York Rangers	NHL	70	11	17	28	27	—	—	—	—	—
1955–56	New York Rangers	NHL	64	14	25	39	37	5	0	1	1	2
1956–57	New York Rangers	NHL	67	11	19	30	20	5	0	3	3	0
1957–58	New York Rangers	NHL	70	12	22	34	22	6	1	0	1	4
1958–59	New York Rangers	NHL	61	13	21	34	28	—	—	—	—	—
1959–60	New York Rangers	NHL	66	14	22	36	16	—	—	—	—	—
1960–61	New York Rangers	NHL	4	0	1	1	0	—	—	—	—	—
1960–61	Vancouver Canucks	WHL	69	19	48	67	12	9	1	3	4	0
1961–62	Vancouver Canucks	WHL	59	9	22	31	12	—	—	—	—	—
1961–62	Springfield Indians	AHL	—	—	—	—	—	10	0	3	3	2
1962–63	Vancouver Canucks	WHL	65	15	21	36	24	7	0	1	1	4
1963–64	Vancouver Canucks	WHL	39	8	11	19	18	—	—	—	—	—
1964–65	Vancouver Canucks	WHL	69	7	9	16	12	5	0	1	1	2
1965–66	Vancouver Canucks	WHL	68	16	15	31	20	7	2	3	5	2
1966–67	Vancouver Canucks	WHL	71	22	26	48	18	3	1	1	2	2
1967–68	Vancouver Canucks	WHL	27	6	6	12	4	—	—	—	—	—
1967–68	California/Oakland Seals	NHL	47	5	14	19	12	—	—	—	—	—
1968–69	Omaha Knights	CHL	57	1	4	5	16	7	1	0	1	0
1969–70	Omaha Knights	CHL	2	0	0	0	0	—	—	—	—	—
WHL totals			607	161	234	395	165	50	13	26	39	14
WHA totals			145	33	31	64	49	6	1	2	3	6
NHL totals			449	80	141	221	162	16	1	4	5	6

=== Coaching record ===
Team	Year	Regular season						Postseason
Team	Year	G	W	L	T	Pts	Finish	Result
New York Rangers	1973–74	41	18	14	9	45	3rd in East	(interim coach)

Preceded by Emile Francis	Head coach of the New York Rangers; 1973–74	Succeeded by Emile Francis
