= Alexander Steen =

Swedish ice hockey player (born 1984)

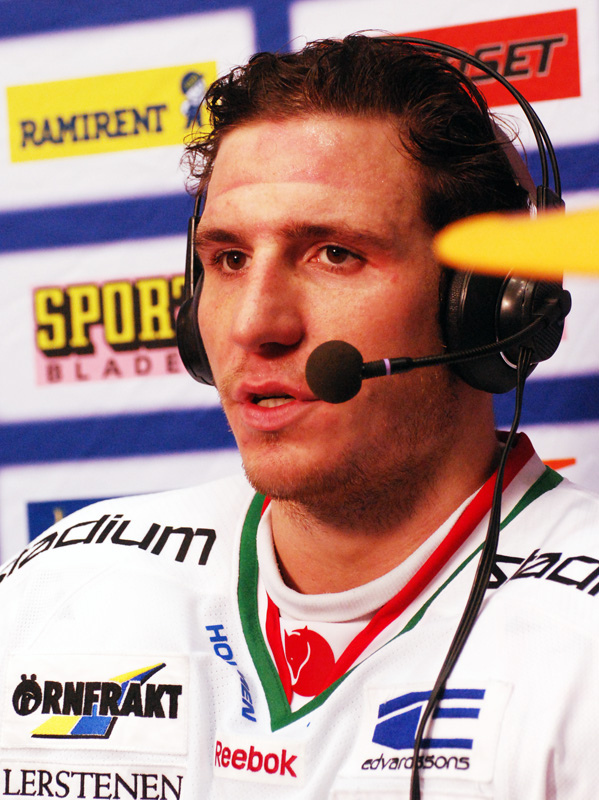
- Steen with Modo Hockey in 2012
- Born: 1 March 1984 (age 42) Winnipeg, Manitoba, Canada
- Height: 6 ft 1 in (185 cm)
- Weight: 212 lb (96 kg; 15 st 2 lb)
- Position: Left wing
- Shot: Left
- Played for: Frölunda HC; Modo Hockey; Toronto Maple Leafs; St. Louis Blues
- National team: Sweden
- NHL draft: 24th overall, 2002; Toronto Maple Leafs
- Playing career: 2001–2020

Alexander Lennart Steen (born 1 March 1984) is a Swedish-Canadian former professional ice hockey player and executive who currently serves as general manager of the St. Louis Blues of the National Hockey League (NHL). He was drafted 24th overall by the Toronto Maple Leafs in the 2002 NHL entry draft, and started his NHL career with Toronto. He was traded to the Blues in 2008, where he played the remainder of his career, winning the Stanley Cup in 2019. Steen succeeded Doug Armstrong as general manager of the Blues after the 2025–26 season.

Steen is the son of Thomas Steen, who also played professional ice hockey and later became a conservative politician.

== Playing career ==
=== Elitserien (2001–2005) ===
Steen played for Frölunda HC from 1999 to 2004. He spent the 2004–05 season with Modo Hockey after a highly controversial signing.

=== Toronto Maple Leafs (2005–2008) ===
In the 2002 NHL entry draft, Steen was selected in the first round by the Toronto Maple Leafs, 24th overall. He played his first game with the Leafs on 5 October 2005 during the season opener against the rival Ottawa Senators, and registered a minor penalty. His first career NHL goal came in the next game on 8 October against the Montreal Canadiens. This goal marked the first time a Swedish father (former Winnipeg Jets player Thomas Steen) and son both scored in the NHL (beating Robert Nilsson, son of Kent Nilsson, by 21 days). Steen scored his first career hat-trick on 4 January 2007 against the Boston Bruins, ending with a five-point game night.

=== St. Louis Blues (2008–2020) ===
On 24 November 2008, Steen was traded by the Leafs, along with Carlo Colaiacovo, to the St. Louis Blues for Lee Stempniak.

On 1 July 2010, Steen signed a four-year contract extension with the Blues. He had an NHL career-high 51 points in the 2011–12 season.

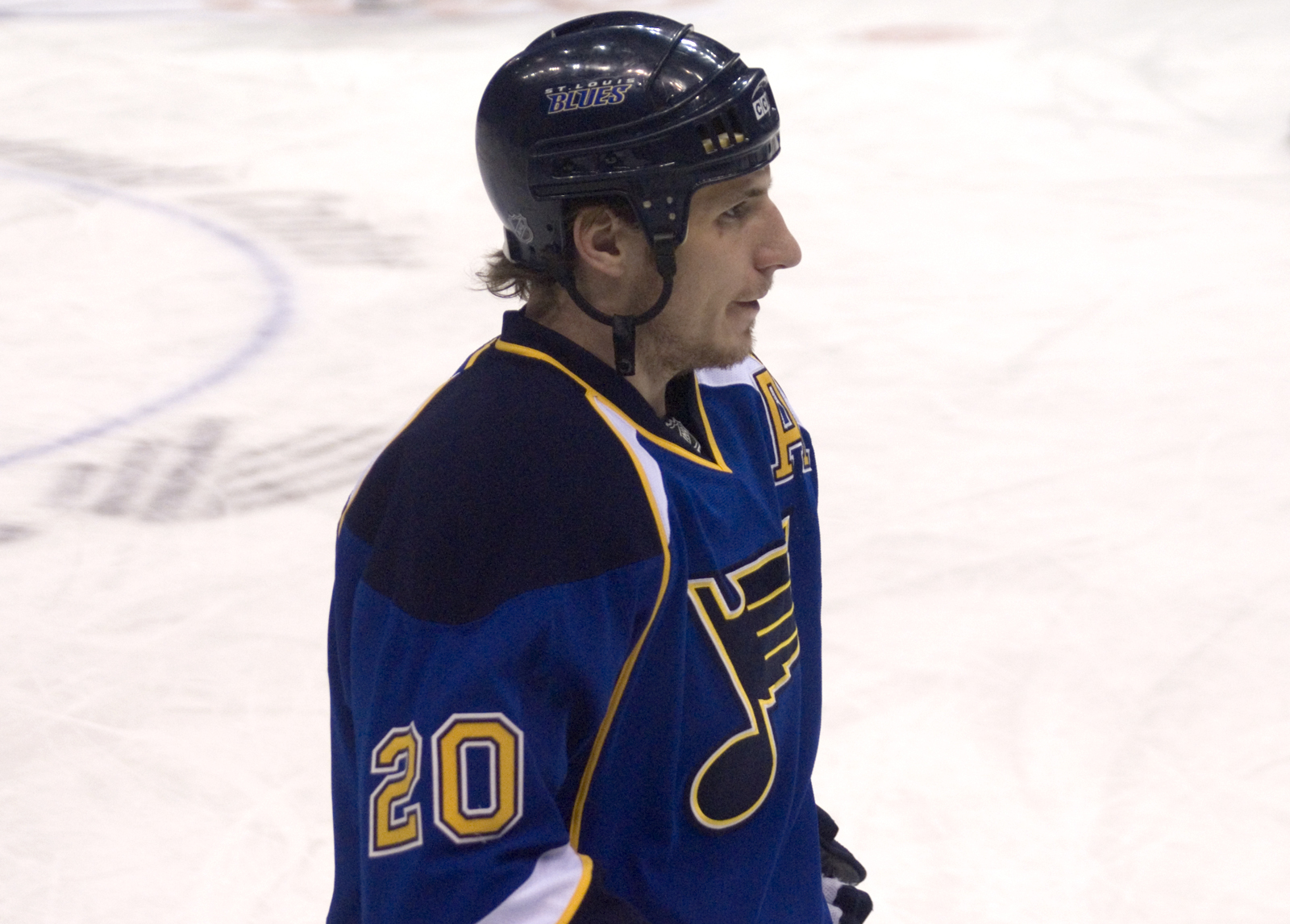
Steen with the Blues in February 2011

On 25 September 2012, Steen returned to Modo Hockey on a short-term contract during the 2012–13 NHL lockout.

He was named the NHL First Star of the Month for October 2013, with his 11 goals leading the league, and 16 points, fourth-best. With a goal and an assist against the Carolina Hurricanes on November 16, Steen extended his point streak to 13 consecutive games, the best such streak by a Blues player since Pierre Turgeon in 1999–2000.

Steen signed a three-year, $17.4 million contract with the Blues on 18 December 2013.

On 4 April 2014, he was nominated by the St. Louis chapter of the Professional Hockey Writers' Association for the Bill Masterton Memorial Trophy. The trophy is awarded annually to the player "who best exemplifies the qualities of perseverance, sportsmanship and dedication to hockey." Steen lead the Blues with 33 goals, and lead them in the points department as well with 62 points despite losing 11 games from a concussion in December 2013.

On 23 September 2016, he signed a four-year, $23 million contract extension with the Blues.

Steen won the 2019 Stanley Cup Final with the Blues, St. Louis' first Stanley Cup in their 52-year franchise history.

==== Retirement ====
On 17 December 2020, Steen announced his retirement from hockey due to a back injury. Steen finished his career fourth in games played, sixth in assists, and fifth in points in Blues franchise history. Additionally, he and his father are one of just four father-son duos to each obtain 600 points in the NHL.

== Post-playing career ==
Steen spent the 2023-24 season working in the St. Louis Blues hockey operations department as a European development consultant. On June 13, 2024, it was announced that Steen would be promoted to special assistant to the general manager, with plans to become the general manager after the 2025–26 season. On April 24, 2026, the Blues formally confirmed that Steen would succeed Armstrong as general manager on July 1; however, the Blues later announced on June 30 that Steen had officially begun his general manager duties that day.

== Personal life ==
Alexander Steen's father is former Winnipeg Jets star Thomas Steen, a forward who scored 817 points in 950 NHL games between 1981 and 1995. As Steen was born in Winnipeg during his father's tenure with the Jets, he has dual Canadian and Swedish citizenship; he has chosen to represent Sweden in international hockey competition. Alexander has two surviving siblings — his youngest brother Amadeus died at the age of two months of a heart condition. His death was the motivation for Alex, along with family members, to create the Amadeus Steen Foundation to raise funds for, and offer support for, infant and child health care.

== Career statistics ==
=== Regular season and playoffs ===
			Regular season					Playoffs
Season	Team	League	GP	G	A	Pts	PIM	GP	G	A	Pts	PIM
1999–2000	Västra Frölunda HC	SWE J18	12	3	5	8	14	2	0	0	0	2
2000–01	Västra Frölunda HC	SWE J18	4	3	3	6	9	1	0	0	0	0
2000–01	Västra Frölunda HC	J20	15	5	7	12	6	5	4	2	6	2
2001–02	Västra Frölunda HC	J20	25	22	18	40	49	2	1	1	2	2
2001–02	Västra Frölunda HC	SEL	26	0	3	3	14	10	1	2	3	0
2002–03	Västra Frölunda HC	J20	2	0	2	2	0	—	—	—	—	—
2002–03	Västra Frölunda HC	SEL	45	5	10	15	18	16	2	3	5	4
2003–04	Västra Frölunda HC	SEL	48	10	14	24	50	10	4	6	10	14
2004–05	Modo Hockey	SEL	50	9	8	17	26	6	1	0	1	4
2005–06	Toronto Maple Leafs	NHL	75	18	27	45	42	—	—	—	—	—
2006–07	Toronto Maple Leafs	NHL	82	15	20	35	26	—	—	—	—	—
2007–08	Toronto Maple Leafs	NHL	76	15	27	42	32	—	—	—	—	—
2008–09	Toronto Maple Leafs	NHL	20	2	2	4	6	—	—	—	—	—
2008–09	St. Louis Blues	NHL	61	6	18	24	24	4	0	1	1	0
2009–10	St. Louis Blues	NHL	68	24	23	47	30	—	—	—	—	—
2010–11	St. Louis Blues	NHL	72	20	31	51	26	—	—	—	—	—
2011–12	St. Louis Blues	NHL	43	15	13	28	28	9	1	2	3	6
2012–13	Modo Hockey	SEL	20	8	15	23	28	—	—	—	—	—
2012–13	St. Louis Blues	NHL	40	8	19	27	14	6	3	0	3	6
2013–14	St. Louis Blues	NHL	68	33	29	62	46	6	1	2	3	6
2014–15	St. Louis Blues	NHL	74	24	40	64	33	6	1	3	4	2
2015–16	St. Louis Blues	NHL	67	17	35	52	48	20	4	6	10	30
2016–17	St. Louis Blues	NHL	76	16	35	51	53	10	3	4	7	4
2017–18	St. Louis Blues	NHL	76	15	31	46	0	—	—	—	—	—
2018–19	St. Louis Blues	NHL	65	10	17	27	14	26	2	3	5	2
2019–20	St. Louis Blues	NHL	55	7	10	17	12	4	0	0	0	6
NHL totals			1,018	245	377	622	454	91	15	21	36	62

=== International ===
Medal record

Men's ice hockey

Representing Sweden

Winter Olympics
Silver medal – second place	2014 Sochi	

Year	Team	Event	GP	G	A	Pts	PIM
2002	Sweden	WJC18	8	2	6	8	8
2003	Sweden	WJC	6	4	2	6	6
2004	Sweden	WJC	6	2	1	3	4
2007	Sweden	WC	9	2	2	4	6
2014	Sweden	OG	6	1	3	4	4
Junior totals			20	8	9	17	18
Senior totals			15	3	5	8	10

== Awards and honours ==
Award	Year
NHL
Stanley Cup champion	2019

== See also ==
- List of family relations in the NHL
- List of NHL players with 1,000 games played

Awards and achievements
Preceded by Carlo Colaiacovo	Toronto Maple Leafs first-round draft pick 2002	Succeeded by Tuukka Rask
Sporting positions
Preceded by Doug Armstrong	General manager of the St. Louis Blues; 2026–present	Incumbent
