= Ron Caron =

Canadian ice hockey executive

- Born: December 19, 1929 Hull, Quebec, Canada
- Died: January 9, 2012 (aged 82) Montréal, Quebec, Canada
- Coached for: St. Louis Blues

Ronald Caron (December 19, 1929 – January 9, 2012) was a Canadian National Hockey League (NHL) executive who held positions with both the Montreal Canadiens and the St. Louis Blues.

== Early life ==
Caron was born on December 19, 1929, in Hull, Quebec, a city that is now part of Gatineau. Raised in a French-Canadian household, he grew up during the Great Depression and World War II, eras that helped shape his work ethic and resilience. He pursued higher education at the University of Ottawa, where he earned his degree. His academic background, combined with his passion for hockey, would later contribute to his reputation as a sharp strategist and thoughtful executive in the world of professional ice hockey.

== Hockey career ==
=== Montreal Canadiens ===
Caron started his professional ice hockey career in 1959 as a part-time scout for the Montreal Junior Canadiens and was promoted to head scout in 1968. He took over as head coach of the Montreal Voyageurs for the 1970–71 season, replacing Al MacNeil, but was later succeeded midseason by Floyd Curry. The following year, he became the Voyageurs' general manager. Over the next ten seasons, he held various roles with the team, including assistant general manager and director of recruitment and player personnel.

=== St. Louis Blues ===
Caron served as the general manager of the St. Louis Blues from 1983 to 1994, playing a key role in acquiring standout players such as Doug Gilmour, Brett Hull, and Adam Oates. Before joining the Blues, he was the head scout for the Montreal Canadiens and contributed to six Stanley Cup victories in the 1970s while serving as assistant general manager. Known for his exceptional recall of hockey history, he earned the nickname "The Old Professor."

== Death ==
Caron died peacefully at the age of 82 on January 9, 2012, at his home in Montreal.

== Awards ==
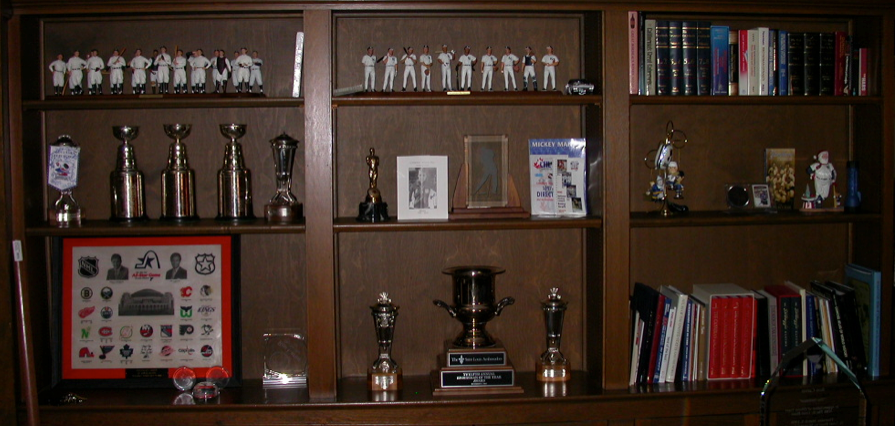
Stanley Cup awards at Caron's home in St Louis County MO, 2005

- Stanley Cup Champions 1971, 1973, 1976, 1977, 1978, 1979

Sporting positions
Preceded by Emile Francis	General Manager of the St. Louis Blues; 1983–94	Succeeded by Mike Keenan
Preceded by Mike Keenan	Interim General Manager of the St. Louis Blues; 1996–97	Succeeded by Larry Pleau
