= Denis Ball =

Canadian ice hockey executive

Denis John Milton Ball (June 24, 1926 – April 22, 2003) was the vice-president of hockey operations for the St. Louis Blues hockey team, and acted as general manager from 1975 to 1976.

Ball was born in Winnipeg, Manitoba, Canada. He died in 2003.
