= St. Louis Blues =

National Hockey League team in St. Louis, Missouri

- 2026–27 St. Louis Blues season
- Conference: Western
- Division: Central
- Founded: 1967
- History: St. Louis Blues; 1967–present
- Home arena: Enterprise Center
- City: St. Louis, Missouri
- Team colors: Blue, yellow, white
- Media: FanDuel Sports Network Midwest; 101 ESPN
- Owner(s): SLB Acquisition Holdings LLC (Tom Stillman, chairman and governor)
- General manager: Alexander Steen
- Head coach: Jim Montgomery
- Captain: Robert Thomas
- Minor league affiliates: Springfield Thunderbirds (AHL); Worcester Railers (ECHL)
- Stanley Cups: 1 (2018–19)
- Conference championships: 1 (2018–19)
- Presidents' Trophies: 1 (1999–00)
- Division championships: 10 (1968–69, 1969–70, 1976–77, 1980–81, 1984–85, 1986–87, 1999–00, 2011–12, 2014–15, 2019–20)
- Official website: nhl.com/blues

The St. Louis Blues are a professional ice hockey team based in St. Louis. The Blues compete in the National Hockey League (NHL) as a member of the Central Division in the Western Conference. The franchise was founded in 1967 as one of the six teams from the 1967 NHL expansion and is named after the W. C. Handy song "Saint Louis Blues". They play their home games at the 18,096-seat Enterprise Center in downtown St. Louis, which has been their arena since moving from St. Louis Arena in 1994.

The Blues won the Stanley Cup in 2019 and have the most Stanley Cup playoff appearances outside of the Original Six. Although frequent postseason contenders for most of their history, the franchise has usually struggled in the playoffs, including consecutive Stanley Cup Final defeats at the end of their first three seasons. With the Blues' victory in their fourth Stanley Cup Final, 49 years after their last appearance and in their 52nd year of existence, they became the final active team from the 1967 expansion to win their first Stanley Cup.

The Blues have a rivalry with the Chicago Blackhawks, with whom they have shared a division since 1970. (Note: Excluding the 2020–21 NHL season, which placed teams in different divisions due to the COVID-19 pandemic.) The Springfield Thunderbirds of the American Hockey League (AHL) and the Worcester Railers of the ECHL are the team's minor league affiliates.

== History ==
=== Hockey in St. Louis before 1967 ===
Although the St. Louis Arena was not originally designed with hockey in mind, it met NHL standards of the era for size and had good sight lines for the game. After an ice plant was installed, the minor league St. Louis Flyers began play there in 1929. St. Louis soon began to attract the interest as a potential NHL market, eventually leading the owners of the moribund Ottawa Senators to move there for the 1934–35 season. The move proved both ill-conceived and ill-timed, as the renamed St. Louis Eagles continued to lose money. Their situation was not helped by the decision to keep the Eagles in the Canadian Division to keep the divisions balanced, which left the team with unaffordable travel expenses to games in Toronto and Montreal in an age where long round-trip train travel was required. The team finished last in the division and disbanded after one season.

Following further contraction, the league stabilized at six teams after 1942. During this period, the NHL rebuffed attempts at further expansion. Eventually, the St. Louis Arena came under the control of the owners of the Chicago Black Hawks. The Black Hawks treated St. Louis as a secondary market, placing minor league affiliates there and even playing a few NHL games in St. Louis during the 1950s while the team still struggled to sell tickets at Chicago Stadium.

=== 1967 expansion ===
The Blues were one of the six teams added to the NHL in the 1967 expansion, along with the Minnesota North Stars, Los Angeles Kings, Philadelphia Flyers, Pittsburgh Penguins, and California Seals. St. Louis was the last of the six expansion teams to gain entry into the League; the market was chosen over Baltimore at the insistence of the Black Hawks owners, James D. Norris and Arthur Wirtz. Following the Black Hawks' championship in 1961, the team became much more successful at the box office in Chicago, thus St. Louis was no longer useful as a secondary market. Nevertheless, the Black Hawks owners still owned the St. Louis Arena. They sought to unload what was then a decrepit facility which had not been well-maintained since the 1940s, and thus pressed the NHL to give the franchise to St. Louis, which had not submitted a formal expansion bid. The Black Hawks owners felt they could establish a "lovable loser" and a reliable regional rivalry, akin to that of baseball's Cardinals and Cubs. Despite this, NHL president Clarence Campbell said during the 1967 expansion meetings, "We want a team in St. Louis because of the city's geographical location and the fact that it has an adequate building."

The team's first owners were insurance tycoon Sid Salomon Jr., his son, Sid Salomon III, and Robert L. Wolfson, who were granted the franchise in 1966. Sid Salomon III convinced his initially wary father to make a bid for the team. Former St. Louis Cardinals great Stan Musial and Musial's business partner Julius "Biggie" Garagnani were also members of the 16-man investment group that made the initial formal application for the franchise. Garagnani would never see the Blues franchise take the ice, as he died from a heart attack on June 19, 1967, less than three months before the Blues played their first preseason game. Upon acquiring the franchise in 1966, Salomon then spent several million dollars on extensive renovations for the 38-year-old arena, expanding it from 12,000 seats to 15,000.

=== Beginnings and Stanley Cup Final appearances (1967–1970) ===
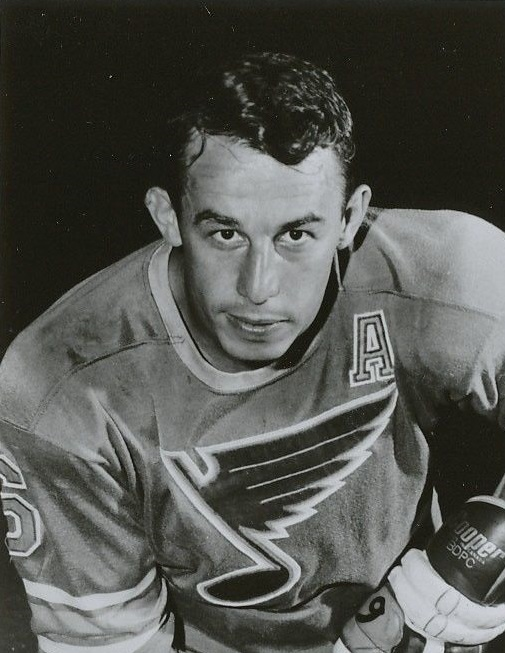
Jim Roberts was the first selected skater by the Blues in the 1967 NHL expansion draft. He played with the Blues from 1967 to 1972.

Lynn Patrick initially served as general manager and head coach. However, he resigned as head coach in late November after recording a 4–13–2 record. He was replaced by assistant coach Scotty Bowman, who thereafter led the team to a winning record for the rest of the season. Like the other five expansion teams, the Blues' roster consisted primarily of castoffs from the Original Six and players who had previously never managed to break out of the minor leagues. As part of the expansion, the NHL had agreed to put all of the expansion teams in the new West Division, an arrangement which was intended to ensure all of the new teams all had an equal chance of reaching the playoffs.

Under the expansion playoff format, Bowman's leadership was enough as the Blues qualified for the playoffs in their inaugural season. Although they had finished in third place, St. Louis was regarded as fairly evenly matched with the other three Western qualifiers since only four points separated first and fourth place. Ultimately, it was the Blues who prevailed by winning in seven games each over the Philadelphia Flyers and Minnesota North Stars to reach the 1968 Stanley Cup Final. However, St. Louis was swept in their first Cup Final appearance by the heavily favored Montreal Canadiens.

Under Bowman, the Blues dominated the West for the next two seasons, becoming the only expansion team to compile a winning record, and they captured division titles by wide margins each year. However, they were swept in the Stanley Cup Final by the Montreal Canadiens in 1969 and then by the Boston Bruins in 1970.

While the first Blues teams included fading veterans like Doug Harvey, Don McKenney and Dickie Moore, the goaltending tandem of veterans Glenn Hall and Jacques Plante proved more durable, winning a Vezina Trophy in 1969 behind a sterling defense that featured players like skilled defensive forward Jim Roberts, team captain Al Arbour and hardrock brothers Bob and Barclay Plager. Phil Goyette won the Lady Byng Trophy for the Blues in 1970 and New York Rangers castoff Red Berenson became the expansion team's first major star at center. The arena quickly became one of the loudest buildings in the NHL, a reputation it maintained throughout its tenure as the Blues' home.

During that time, Salomon gained a reputation throughout the NHL as the top players' owner. He gave his players cars, signed them to deferred contracts and treated them to vacations in Florida. The players, used to being treated like mere commodities, felt the only way they could pay him back was to give their best on the ice every night.

=== Financial problems, near-move, and playoff streak (1970–1987) ===
The Blues' successes in the late 1960s, however, did not continue into the 1970s. The format of the Stanley Cup playoffs changed in such a way that a Western team was no longer guaranteed a Stanley Cup Final berth, and also the Chicago Black Hawks were moved into the West Division before the 1970–71 season due to NHL expansion. The Blues lost Bowman, who left during the 1970–71 season following a power-sharing dispute with Sid Salomon III (who was taking an increasing role in team affairs), as well as Hall, Plante, Goyette and ultimately Berenson, who were all lost to retirement or trade. Veteran player Al Arbour hastily stepped in to coach the team. Under Arbour, the Blues essentially matched their 1969–70 regular season performance in their fourth season, and were still the best of the expansion teams; however, it was only good enough for second place in the West as St. Louis finished 20 points behind Chicago. The Blues would go on to be upset by the North Stars in six games, thus failing to advance past the first round for the first time in franchise history.

Arbour, who officially retired as a player after the 1970–71 season, would remain behind the Blues' bench for the next two seasons. The Berenson trade did bring then-Detroit Red Wings star center Garry Unger, who ultimately scored 30 goals in eight consecutive seasons while breaking the NHL's consecutive games played record. Defensively, however, the Blues were less than stellar and saw Chicago and the Philadelphia Flyers overtake the Division. After missing the playoffs for the first time in 1973–74, the Blues ended up in the Smythe Division after a League realignment. This division was particularly weak, and in 1976–77, the Blues won it while finishing five games below .500, though this would be their last playoff appearance in the decade.

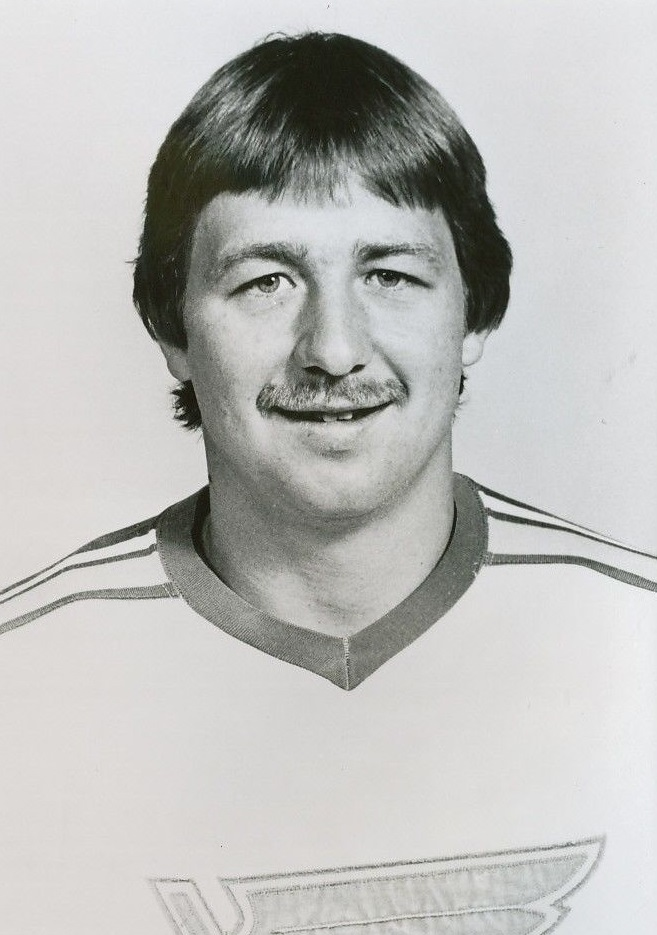
Drafted by the Blues in 1976, Bernie Federko played with the team from 1976 to 1989. He holds the record for games played with the Blues.

In the meantime, the franchise was on the brink of financial collapse. This was partly due to the pressures of the World Hockey Association (WHA), but mostly the result of financial decisions made when the Salomons first acquired the franchise. The deferred contracts came due just as the Blues' performance began to slip. At one point, the Salomons cut the team's staff down to three employees. One of them was Emile Francis, who served as team president, general manager and head coach. In hopes of saving the franchise, Francis persuaded St. Louis-based pet food giant Ralston Purina to buy the team, arena, and the $8.8 million debt. The Salomons sold the Blues to Ralston on July 27, 1977. Longtime Ralston Purina chairman R. Hal Dean said that he intended to keep the Blues as a subsidiary only temporarily until a more stable owner could be found, but he would only accept offers from interests who would keep the team in St. Louis. Ralston renamed the arena the "Checkerdome." After two awful years, including what is still a franchise-worst 18–50–12 record with 48 points in 1979, the Blues made the playoffs the following year, the first of 25 consecutive postseason appearances.

After being one of the worst teams a couple of years before, they were one of the best in 1981, as they finished with a then-franchise-best record of 45–18–17 record which translated to 107 points and the second-best record in the league. Ten players reached at least 20 goals, including Wayne Babych, future Hall of Famer Bernie Federko, and team captain Brian Sutter. They also had strong goaltending led by Mike Liut. They would get rewarded as head coach Red Berenson won the Jack Adams Award, Mike Liut finished a close second to Wayne Gretzky in the Hart Trophy voting, and earned the top spot on the NHL All-Star team, Larry Patey finished third in the Frank J. Selke Trophy voting, and Blake Dunlop won the Bill Masterton Memorial Trophy. Their regular season success, however, did not transfer into the playoffs, as they were eliminated by the New York Rangers in the second round 2–4 after beating the Pittsburgh Penguins in the first round 3–2. The Blues would underachieve greatly the following year as they posted a 32–40–8, but they beat the Winnipeg Jets 3–1 in the Norris Division semifinals before dropping to the Chicago Black Hawks in the Norris Division 2–4.

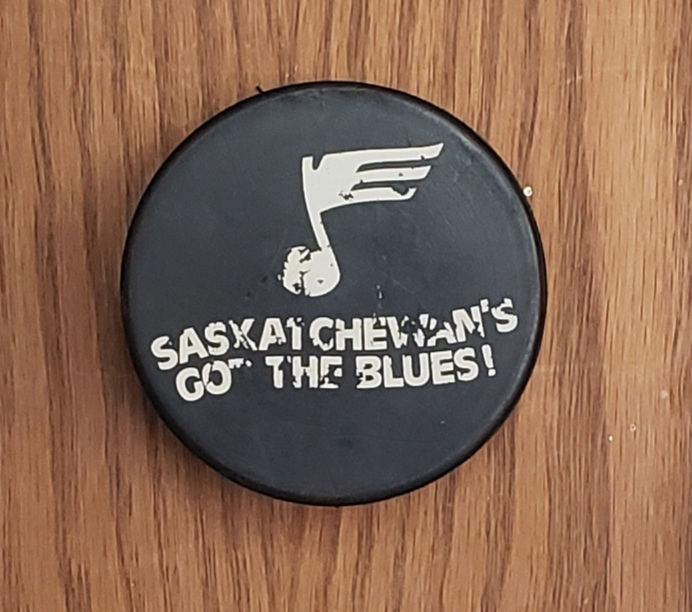
"Saskatchewan's Got The Blues!" hockey puck circa 1983

While the Blues had returned to respectability on the ice, they were struggling off it. Ralston Purina lost an estimated $1.8 million a year during its six-year ownership of the Blues. However, Dean took the losses philosophically, having taken over out of a sense of civic responsibility. In 1981, Dean retired. His successor, William Stiritz, wanted to refocus on the core pet food business, and his personal sporting interests were in horse racing rather than hockey. He saw the Blues as just another money-bleeding division, and put the team on the market. While there were a number of interested parties, none had enough cash to meet Ralston's asking price. On January 12, 1983, Batoni-Hunter Enterprises Ltd., led by WHA and Edmonton Oilers founder Bill Hunter, tendered an offer to buy the team. Hunter intended to build a $43 million, 18,000-seat arena in his hometown of Saskatoon, Saskatchewan, to house the team in time for the 1983–84 season. While the fans were stunned, the players were aware of Hunter's bid. When the Blues faced the Oilers on December 7, 1982, brochures were distributed titled "Saskatchewan in the NHL". These distractions would greatly affect their performance as they squeezed into the playoffs with a 25–40–15 record in the 1983 season, good enough for 65 points. This led to a Norris Division semifinals exit against the Chicago Black Hawks. Following their playoff exit, Ralston authorized the deal to Hunter's company, renamed Coliseum Holdings, Ltd., for $12 million on April 21. Emile Francis would call it quits on May 2, leaving to become president and general manager of the Hartford Whalers. The Blues then fired 60 percent of their employees. The only remaining staff included the accounting department, scouting staff, and coach Barclay Plager. They waited for an authorization by 75% of the NHL Board of Governors for the sale and transfer of the club. However, the NHL Board of Governors rejected the deal by a 15–3 vote on May 18. The owners did not believe that Saskatoon was big enough to support an NHL team, and were also wary of Hunter's involvement based on his roles in the WHA.

Ralston then filed a $60 million anti-trust lawsuit in U.S. District Court, claiming that the NHL broke federal antitrust laws and breached the duty of good faith and fair dealing by voting to reject the sale and transfer of the Blues to Hunter's group. They also requested that the court allow them to give up the team and bar the NHL from interfering with the sale of the team. On June 3, Ralston announced that it had no interest in running the Blues. Because they were not required to participate in the 1983 NHL entry draft, they did not send a representative, which led the Blues to forfeit their picks. The day after the draft, the NHL filed a $78 million counter-suit against Ralston, accusing Ralston of "damaging the league by willfully, wantonly and maliciously collapsing its St. Louis Blues hockey operation." The NHL also said that Ralston broke a league rule that an owner had to give two years' notice before dissolving a franchise. Ralston called the counter-suit "ridiculous" and gave the NHL an ultimatum: if the NHL did not accept Hunter's offer by June 14, Ralston would dissolve the team and sell its players and assets to other teams. The Board of Governors rejected the offer and "terminated" the team on June 13, one day before Ralston's supposed deadline. It then took control of the franchise and began searching for a new owner. League president John Ziegler said they would try to keep the team in St. Louis. However, had the league not found a new owner by August 6, it would dissolve the team and hold a dispersal draft for the players. On July 27, 1983, ten days before the deadline, the NHL approved a bid from a group of St. Louis investors led by businessman Harry Ornest for the team and the arena. Ornest had made plans to buy the team as early as March, but built up his efforts in late June to have enough money. Ornest immediately reverted the name of the team's home venue to the St. Louis Arena. To date, this is the closest that an NHL team has come to folding since the Cleveland Barons merged with the Minnesota North Stars after the 1977–78 season.

Ornest ran the Blues very cheaply, though the players did not mind. According to Sutter, they wanted to stay in St. Louis because it reminded them of the rural Canadian towns where many of them grew up. For instance, Ornest asked many players to defer their salaries to help meet operating costs, but the players always got paid in the end. During most of Ornest's tenure, the Blues had only 26 players under contract–23 in St. Louis, plus three on their farm team, the Montana Magic. Most NHL teams during the mid-1980s had over 60 players under contract. Despite operating on a shoestring, the Blues remained competitive even though they never finished more than six games over .500 in Ornest's three years as owner. During this time, Doug Gilmour, drafted by St. Louis in 1982, emerged as a star.

While the Blues remained competitive, they were unable to keep many of their young players. More often than not, several of the Blues' emerging stars ended up as Calgary Flames, and the sight of Flames executive Al MacNeil was always greeted with dread. In fact, several of the Blues' young stars, such as Rob Ramage, Joe Mullen and Gilmour, were main cogs in the Flames' 1989 Stanley Cup win. Sutter and Federko were the only untouchables on the Blues during that era. By 1986, the team reached the Campbell Conference finals against the Flames. Doug Wickenheiser's overtime goal in game 6 to cap a furious comeback remains one of the greatest moments in team history (known locally as the "Monday Night Miracle"), but the Blues lost game 7, 2–1. Years later, Sutter argued that had the Blues made it to the Stanley Cup Final, they would have likely beaten the Canadiens, having won two out of three games against the Habs in the regular season. After that season, Ornest sold the team to a group led by St. Louis businessman Michael Shanahan.

=== Brett Hull era (1988–1998) ===
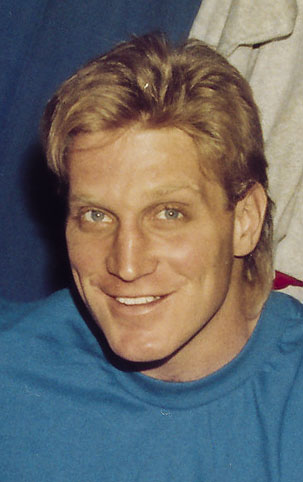
The Blues acquired Brett Hull through a trade in March 1988. Playing with the team until 1998, he holds the record for goals scored with the team.

St. Louis kept chugging along through the late 1980s and early 1990s. General manager Ron Caron made astute moves, landing forwards Brett Hull, Adam Oates and Brendan Shanahan, defenseman Al MacInnis and goaltender Curtis Joseph, among others. While the Blues contended during this time period, they never passed the second round of the playoffs. Nonetheless, their on-ice success was enough for a consortium of 19 companies to buy the team. They also provided the capital to build the Kiel Center (now the Enterprise Center), which opened in 1994.

Hull, nicknamed the "Golden Brett" (a reference to his father, NHL legend Bobby Hull, who was nicknamed the "Golden Jet"), became one of the League's top stars and a scoring sensation, netting 86 goals in 1990–91 en route to earning the Hart Memorial Trophy as the league's most valuable player. Hull's 86 goals set the record for most goals in a single season by a right-winger (and the third-most overall at the time). Only Wayne Gretzky found the net more than Hull during any given three-year period. Despite posting the second-best regular season record in the entire league in 1990–91, the Blues were upset in the second round of the playoffs to the Minnesota North Stars, a defeat that was symbolic of St. Louis' playoff struggles.

Mike Keenan was hired as both general manager and coach before the abbreviated 1994–95 season, with the hope that he could end the postseason turmoil that Blues fans had endured for years. Keenan instituted major changes, including trades that sent away fan favorites Brendan Shanahan and Curtis Joseph, as well as the acquisition of the legendary-but-aging Wayne Gretzky and goaltender Grant Fuhr, both from the declining Los Angeles Kings. During the season, he publicly criticized Gretzky, who entered free agency after the season, declined an offer from the Blues, and took a less lucrative contract with the New York Rangers. Ultimately, Keenan's playoff resume with St. Louis included a first-round exit in 1995 and a second-round exit in 1996, and he was fired on December 19, 1996. Caron was reinstated as interim general manager for the rest of the season, and general manager Larry Pleau was hired on June 9, 1997. Hull, who had a lengthy feud with Keenan, left for the Dallas Stars in 1998. He went on to win the Stanley Cup with the Stars the next year, scoring a controversial goal on the Buffalo Sabres' Dominik Hašek to clinch the Cup for Dallas. The Blues ended the 1990s as the only NHL team to make the playoffs for the entire decade, although a Stanley Cup title still eluded the franchise.

=== End of the playoff streak, lockout, and rebuild (1998–2011) ===
Defenseman Chris Pronger (acquired from the Hartford Whalers in 1995 for Brendan Shanahan), Keith Tkachuk, Pavol Demitra, Pierre Turgeon, Al MacInnis and goaltender Roman Turek kept the Blues a contender in the NHL. In 1999–2000, the team notched a franchise-record 114 points during the regular season, earning the Presidents' Trophy for the League's best record. However, they were stunned by the San Jose Sharks in the first round of the 2000 playoffs in seven games. In the 2000–01 season, the Blues advanced to the conference finals before bowing out in five games to the eventual champions, the Colorado Avalanche. Nonetheless, the team remained competitive for the next three years, despite never advancing beyond the second round. Despite years of mediocrity and the stigma of never being able to "take the next step," the Blues were a playoff presence every year from 1980 to 2004 – the third-longest streak in North American professional sports history (all three of which being held by NHL teams). However, they never made an appearance in the Stanley Cup Final. In fact, they made it to the conference finals only two times in their streak (1986 and 2001).

Amid several questionable personnel moves and an unstable ownership situation, the Blues finished the 2005–06 season with their worst record in 27 years. They missed the playoffs for only the fourth time in franchise history. Moreover, for the first time in club history, the normally excellent support seen by St. Louisans began to decrease, with crowds normally numbering around 12,000, notably less than the team's normal high (about 18,000 in a 19,500-seat arena). Wal-Mart heir Nancy Walton Laurie and her husband Bill purchased the Blues in 1999. On June 17, 2005, the Lauries announced that they would sell the team. Bill Laurie, a former point guard at Memphis State University, had long desired to buy and move a National Basketball Association (NBA) team to St. Louis (coming close to achieving this in 1999, with an unsuccessful attempt to purchase the then-Vancouver Grizzlies), and it was thought that this desire caused him to neglect the Blues. On September 29, 2005, it was announced that the Lauries had signed an agreement to sell the Blues to SCP Worldwide, a consulting and investment group headed by former Madison Square Garden president Dave Checketts. On November 14, 2005, the Blues announced that SCP Worldwide had officially withdrawn from negotiations to buy the team. On December 27, 2005, it was announced that the Blues had signed a letter of intent to exclusively negotiate with General Sports and Entertainment, LLC. However, after the period of exclusivity, SCP entered the picture again. On March 24, 2006, the Lauries completed the sale of the Blues and the lease to the Savvis Center to SCP and TowerBrook Capital Partners, L.P., a private equity firm. The Blues are currently the only team in the four major North American sports (ice hockey, basketball, baseball, and American football) to be owned by a private equity firm.

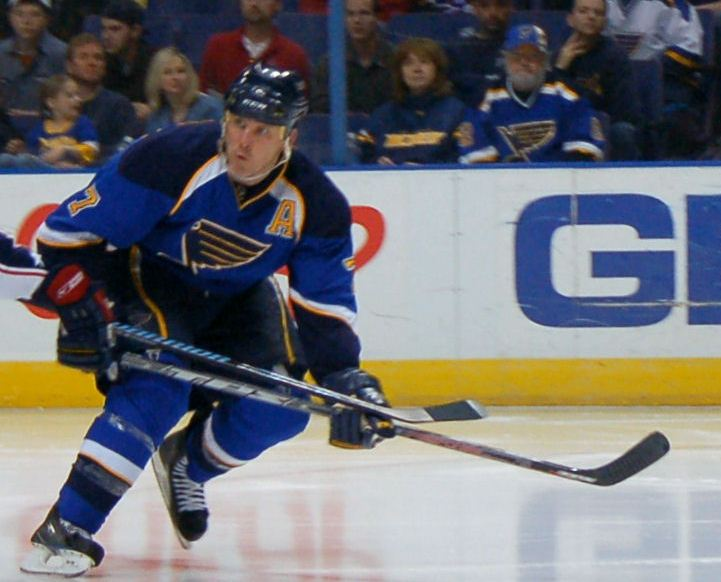
Keith Tkachuk with the Blues. During his time with the team he became the third American player to score 500 goals, and the sixth American player to reach 1,000 points.

Following the disappointing 2005–06 season, which saw the Blues with the worst record in the NHL, the new management focused on rebuilding the franchise. Under new management, the Blues promptly installed John Davidson as president of hockey operations, moving Pleau to a mostly advisory role. The former New York Rangers goaltender promptly made multiple blockbuster deals, picking up Jay McKee, Bill Guerin and Manny Legace from free agency, and bringing Doug Weight back to St. Louis after a brief (and productive) stopover in Carolina. Weight was again traded in December 2007 to the Anaheim Ducks, along with a minor league player, in exchange for Andy McDonald. At the beginning of the 2006–07 season, the Blues looked to be competitive in the Central Division. However, injuries plagued the team all season, and the lack of a bona fide scorer hampered them as well. Fan support was sluggish during the first half of the campaign, and the end of the calendar year was capped by an 11-game losing streak. On December 11, 2006, the Blues fired head coach Mike Kitchen and replaced him with former Los Angeles Kings head coach Andy Murray. Davidson also installed a strong development program under head scout Jarmo Kekäläinen, using the team's raft of high draft picks in 2006 and 2007 to select highly touted prospects such as T. J. Oshie, Erik Johnson and David Perron. On January 4, 2007, the Blues had a record of 6–1–3 in their previous ten games, which was the best in the NHL during that stretch. Despite a healthy 24-point jump from the previous season, the strain of playing in a conference where seven teams finished with more than 100 points kept them out of the playoffs for the second year in a row.

Just before the 2007 NHL trade deadline, the Blues traded several key players, including Bill Guerin, Keith Tkachuk and Dennis Wideman, in exchange for draft picks, though they re-signed Tkachuk after the season ended. Brad Boyes, picked up from the Boston Bruins in exchange for Wideman, became the fastest Blues player to reach 40 goals since Brett Hull, doing so during the 2007–08 season. During the 2007 off-season, the Blues signed free agent Paul Kariya to a three-year contract worth $18 million, re-signed defenseman Barret Jackman to a one-year contract, lost their captain Dallas Drake to the Detroit Red Wings, and traded prospect Carl Söderberg to the Bruins in exchange for yet more depth in the goal crease, Hannu Toivonen.

On October 2, 2007, the Blues finalized the season-starting roster, which included rookies David Perron, Steven Wagner and Erik Johnson. On October 10, the Blues introduced a new mascot, Louie. Two months later, they traded Doug Weight, a 38-year-old four-time All-Star center, to the Anaheim Ducks as part of a package to acquire 30-year-old center Andy McDonald. On February 8, 2008, it was announced that, after going much of the season without a captain, defenseman Eric Brewer was chosen as the team's 19th captain. The team later traded veteran defenseman Bryce Salvador to the New Jersey Devils for enforcer, and St. Louis native, Cam Janssen. He made his debut two days later, wearing number 55 against the Phoenix Coyotes.

After spending the first half of the 2008–09 season at or near the bottom of the Western Conference standings, the Blues began to turn things around behind the solid goaltending of Chris Mason. After a strong second-half run, the Blues made the 2009 playoffs on April 10, 2009, after defeating the Columbus Blue Jackets 3–1. On April 12, the Blues clinched the sixth seed in the West with a 1–0 win against the Colorado Avalanche. For the first time in five years (that is, since the lockout), the Blues were in the playoffs. They faced the third-seeded Vancouver Canucks in the first round, but despite the team's tremendous run to end the season, the Blues would ultimately lose the series in a quick four-game sweep.

The Blues fired head coach Andy Murray on January 2, 2010, after a disappointing record (17–17–6, 40 points), sitting in 12th place in the Conference. Especially galling were the frequent blown leads after two periods, and with the worst home record (6–13–3) posted in the entire NHL. After his duties as interim coach for the rest of the 2009–10 season, Davis Payne was named the 23rd head coach in the Blues' history on April 14. Payne was previously the head coach of the Blues top minor league affiliate, the Peoria Rivermen of the American Hockey League (AHL).

=== Return to contention, first Stanley Cup championship (2011–present) ===
On March 17, 2011, it was announced that the St. Louis Blues were for sale. During the 2011 off-season, the team signed many key free agents, including Brian Elliott, Scott Nichol, Kent Huskins, Jason Arnott and Jamie Langenbrunner. They fired their head coach, Davis Payne, and named Ken Hitchcock as his replacement on November 6, 2011. David Backes was also announced as the new team captain.

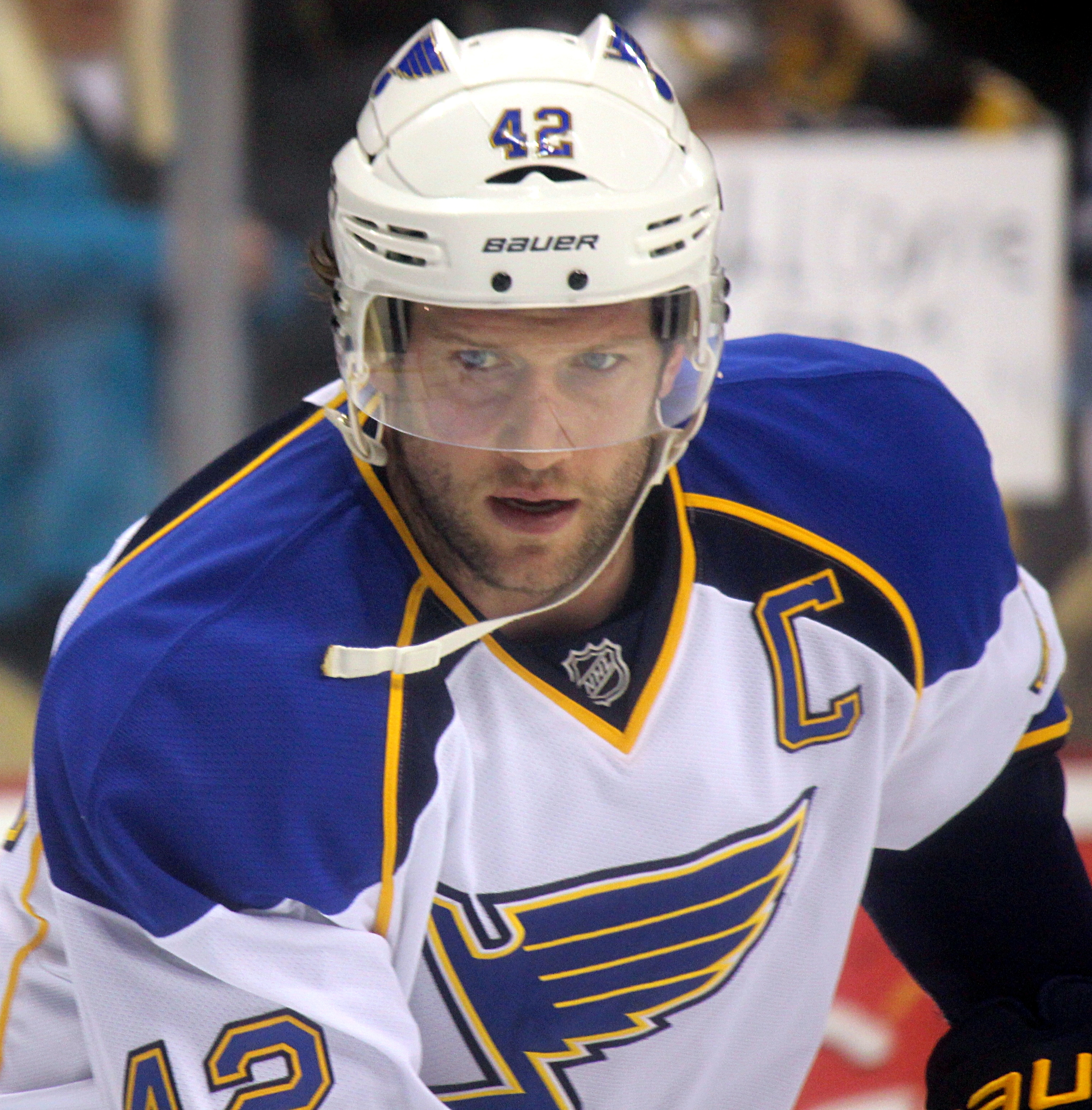
David Backes was named the 20th team captain of the Blues, and remained as captain until 2016.

On March 17, 2012, the Blues became the first team to reach 100 points and clinch a playoff berth in the 2011–12 season under Hitchcock, qualifying for their first playoffs since 2008–09. They would finish second in the Western Conference, behind the Vancouver Canucks. During the 2012 playoffs, they won their first playoff series since 2002, eliminating the San Jose Sharks in five games. The Blues were swept by the eventual Stanley Cup champions, the Los Angeles Kings, in the following round.

In 2012–13, the Blues completed the lockout-shortened season in fourth place in the Western Conference. They were again eliminated by Los Angeles, however, this time in six games in the first round of the playoffs, despite taking an initial 2–0 series lead.

The following season, 2013–14, the team hit the 100-point mark for the sixth time in franchise history, and gained a franchise record of 52 wins. Their chance of winning the Central Division title, the top seed in the West, and the Presidents' Trophy would all evaporate, after they lost their final six games and wound up in second place in the Division, this time to the Colorado Avalanche. The slump haunted them, as they blew a 2–0 series lead to the defending champion Chicago Blackhawks, losing the first-round series in six games. This marked the second-straight year the Blues lost in the first round of the playoffs to the reigning champions in six games after leading the series 2–0.

In 2014–15, the Blues won their second Central Division championship in four years and faced the Minnesota Wild in round one of the 2015 playoffs. However, for the third straight year, they lost in the first round and in six games. During the off-season, forward T. J. Oshie was traded to the Washington Capitals in exchange for Troy Brouwer.

In 2015–16, the Blues finished in second place in the Central Division to the Dallas Stars. The Blues took on the defending champion Chicago Blackhawks in the first-round series. The Blues jumped to a 3–1 series lead, but struggled in games 5 and 6. However, St. Louis ended their first-round losing streak by beating Chicago 3–2 in game 7 of the series. They moved on to the next round, where they defeated the Dallas Stars in another seven-game series to advance to their first conference finals since 2001. The Blues' season would come to an end at the hands of the San Jose Sharks, who eliminated them in six games.

On June 13, 2016, it was announced that Mike Yeo would replace Hitchcock as head coach of the Blues following the 2016–17 season. The 2016 off-season saw big changes for the Blues, as team captain David Backes left the team to sign with the Boston Bruins, and goaltender Brian Elliott was traded to the Calgary Flames, while veteran forward Troy Brouwer also signed with Calgary as a free agent. Steve Ott also left the team, signing a free agent deal with the Red Wings. Jake Allen was now the starting goaltender for the Blues, while the team also signed former Nashville Predators backup Carter Hutton. Former Blues forward David Perron was brought back on a free agent deal, while defenseman Alex Pietrangelo was named team captain.

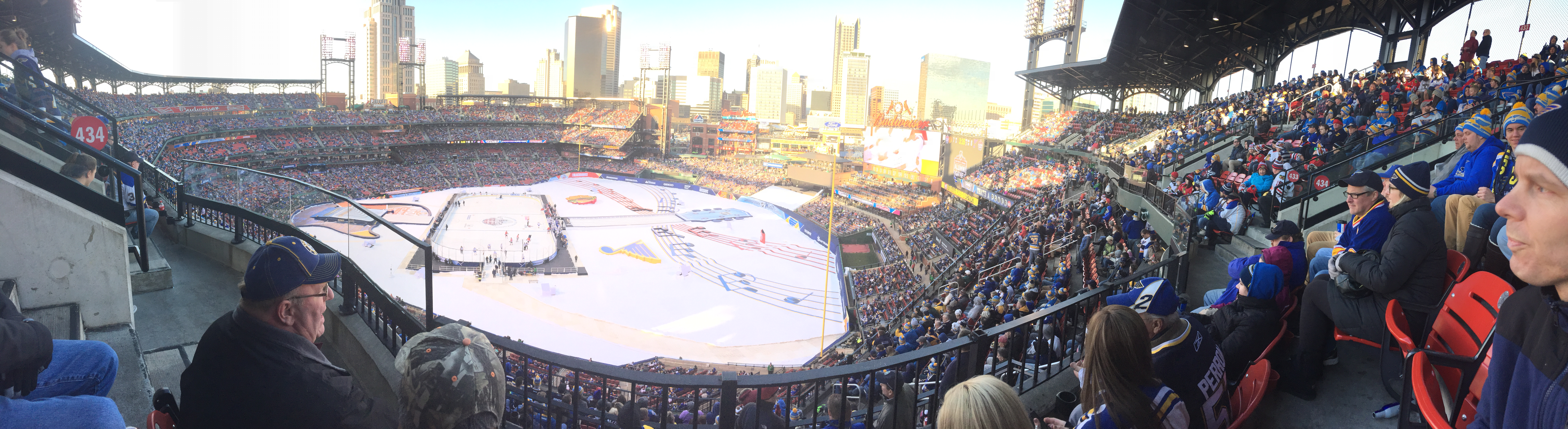
The Blues hosted the Chicago Blackhawks at Busch Stadium for the 2017 Winter Classic.

The team started the season by posting a record of 10–1–2 in their first 13 home games. However, they only won three games on the road during the first two months of the season. Despite defeating the Blackhawks in the 2017 Winter Classic by the score of 4–1, the Blues fired Hitchcock and promoted Yeo to head coach on February 1, 2017. Despite an impressive run into the end of the season, when they gained most points in the league from February 1, when Hitchcock was fired, to the end of the season, the Blues were eliminated in the second round by the Nashville Predators in six games.

In the off-season for the 2017–18 season, the Blues would lose David Perron to the Vegas Golden Knights via an expansion draft. They would also pick up Brayden Schenn from the Philadelphia Flyers by giving away Jori Lehtera. Before the season began, the Blues were hit hard with injuries as they lost Robby Fabbri before the season began. Other players like Patrik Berglund, and Alex Steen did not return in time for the season. Despite these losses, the Blues raced out to a 21–8–2 start in their first 31 games. The Blues lost more players as Jay Bouwmeester suffered a season-ending injury, and Jaden Schwartz missed a large portion of the season. The Blues also dealt away Paul Stastny to the Winnipeg Jets at the trade deadline for their first-round pick as they won only 23 games of their remaining 51, but they still had a chance to get into the playoffs on the last day of their season against the Colorado Avalanche. After losing Vladimir Tarasenko to injury during the game, the Blues lost to the Avalanche 5–2 as they missed the playoffs for the first time in seven years.

During the 2018 off-season, the Blues acquired forward Ryan O'Reilly from the Buffalo Sabres via trade and re-signed Perron to a third stint with the team in free agency, while also signing forwards Tyler Bozak, St. Louis native Patrick Maroon, and goaltender Chad Johnson. On November 19, 2018, the Blues fired head coach Mike Yeo after starting the season with a 7–9–3 record and replaced him with Craig Berube on an interim basis. On March 29, 2019, the Blues became the seventh team in NHL since the 1967–68 season to qualify for the playoffs after being placed last after January 1. This resurgence included an eleven-game winning streak between February and March, in large part thanks to the emergence of the eventual Calder Trophy nominee, rookie goaltender Jordan Binnington.

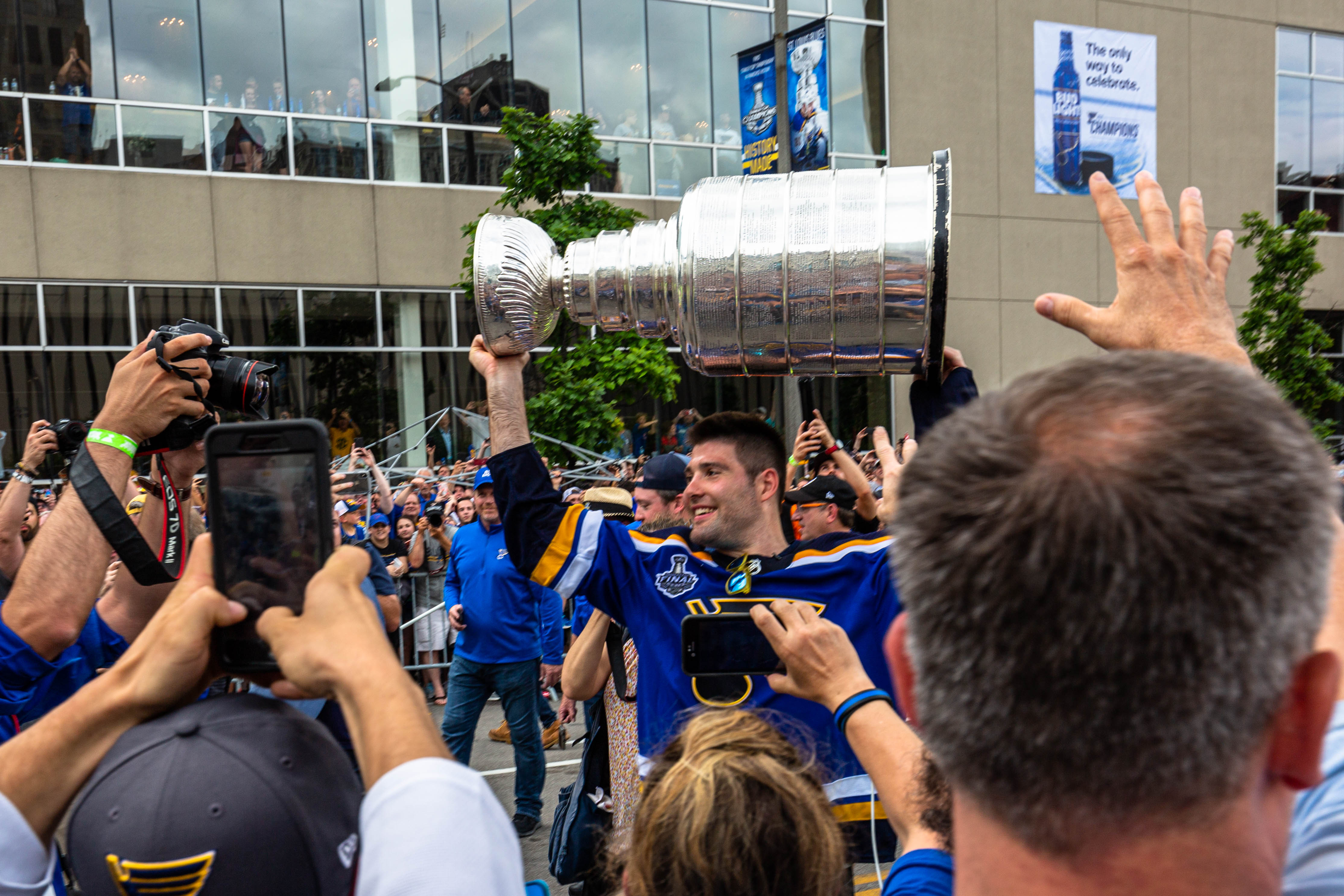
Patrick Maroon with the Stanley Cup at the Blues' victory parade following the 2019 Stanley Cup Final.

On May 21, the Blues advanced to the Stanley Cup Final for the first time since 1970, defeating the San Jose Sharks in a six-game conference finals series. On May 29, the Blues won a Stanley Cup Final series game for the first time in franchise history after getting swept in three previous series (1968–1970), when they defeated the Boston Bruins 3–2 in overtime. On June 12, 2019, the Blues defeated the Bruins 4–1 in game 7 to win their first Stanley Cup. Ryan O'Reilly won the Conn Smythe Trophy for playoff MVP. Up until that point, the Blues were the oldest franchise to never win the Stanley Cup; they were also the last of the five surviving 1967 expansion teams to win the Cup for the first time. This all but assured that Berube would have the "interim" tag removed from his title, which occurred two weeks after their Cup victory. Shortly after the 2019 Stanley Cup Final, Karla May of the Missouri Senate introduced a bill which would officially designate several items as state symbols of Missouri; including the Blues being as the state's official hockey team. The bill was signed into law by Mike Parson, the Governor of Missouri, with the revised statute becoming effective August 29, 2019.

In the 2019–20 season, the Blues suffered an early blow as forward Vladimir Tarasenko suffered a season-ending injury on October 24. However, they would continue their strong play even despite being plagued with various other injuries, consistently remaining at or near the top of the Western Conference. On February 12, 2020, the Blues suffered another loss as defenseman Jay Bouwmeester suddenly collapsed on the bench in a game against the Anaheim Ducks, and would not come back to play again in the season. The game against Anaheim was suspended during the first period and postponed to March 11. This ended up being the Blues' last game in the regular season, as the season would be cut short by the COVID-19 pandemic shortly afterwards. The Blues had remained in strong form throughout the season, finishing first in the Western Conference and second in the NHL. However, as the season was put on pause due to the pandemic, no team would play the full 82 games. Instead, a round-robin tournament for the 2020 Stanley Cup playoffs was organized, starting in August 2020. In the round-robin tournament for the four top-seeded teams of the conference, the Blues failed to get a win, and thus despite having the best regular season record in the conference, they ended up being the fourth seed in the Western Conference. In the first round of the playoffs, they faced the Vancouver Canucks, to whom they lost in six games. In the hiatus preceding the NHL's Return to Play, several Blues players contracted COVID-19, which was cited by the coaching staff as one of the reasons why their play faltered in the playoffs. On September 2, 2020, the Blues traded goaltender Jake Allen, who had spent 10 years in the Blues organization, to the Montreal Canadiens.

== Team information ==
=== Arena ===
The Blues play in the 19,150 (not counting standing room) capacity Enterprise Center, where they have played since 1994. The arena was previously known as Scottrade Center, the Savvis Center, and before that as the Kiel Center. From 1967 until 1994, the team played in the St. Louis Arena (known as The Checkerdome from 1977 until 1983), where the old St. Louis Eagles played, and which the original owners had to buy as a condition of the 1967 NHL expansion.

=== Attendance ===
The St. Louis Blues are one of the more successful NHL teams in terms of attendance. After the 2004–05 lockout, the Blues' attendance suffered, but has since improved every year since its all-time low in 2006–07. In 2009–10, despite not having a playoff year, the Blues had an average attendance of 18,883 (98.6% total capacity), selling out 34 of its 40 home games, which placed them seventh in the NHL in attendance. In 2010–11, the team sold out every home game.

=== Jerseys ===
The Blues have worn blue and white jerseys with the famous "Blue Note" crest and gold accents since their inception in 1967. From 1967 to 1984, the Blues jerseys featured a lighter shade of blue along with contrasting shoulder yoke and stripes. The blue jerseys lacked the contrasting yoke until 1979.

In 1984, the Blues drastically redesigned their look, adding red and darkening the shade of blue. Initially, the front of the jersey featured the team name above the crest logo, but was removed in 1987. In addition, the contrasting shoulder yoke was removed.

For the 1994–95 season, the Blues introduced a more radical jersey set, featuring red in a more prominent role. The jersey introduced the short-lived trumpet logo on the shoulders and featured thin diagonal stripes on the tail and sleeves. The bottom of the numbers taper off to give way to the aforementioned stripes. An updated version of the blue sweater, produced by Adidas, was brought back in 2019 as their "90s Vintage Jersey."

Before the 1997–98 season, the Blues introduced a new alternate white jersey. The jersey brought back the contrasting shoulder yoke and returned to the lighter blue of previous eras. It also replaced red with navy blue as an accent color. A corresponding blue jersey was introduced the following season, thus retiring the previous set.

Like all NHL teams, the Blues updated their jerseys for the 2007–08 season with new Rbk Edge jerseys. The Blues simplified their design, with only the blue note logo on the front; there were no third jerseys for the season. The Blues announced plans for a navy third jersey featuring a new logo, with the Gateway Arch with the Blue Note superimposed over it inside a circle with the words "St. Louis" above and "Blues" below. This third jersey was unveiled on September 21, 2008, and debuted during a Blues' home game against the Anaheim Ducks on November 21, 2008.

For the 2014–15 season, the Blues made a few tweaks to their jerseys. While they kept the Reebok Edge-era template, they brought back the 1998–2007 look. The navy blue third jersey was kept without any alterations, before it was retired prior the 2016–17 season.

When Adidas became the uniform provider before the 2017–18 season, the Blues kept most of the same template, with the exception of the home jersey numbers changing from gold to white. For the 2018–19 season, the Blues added a third jersey based on the one worn during the 2017 Winter Classic, to be worn on Saturday home games. A corresponding vintage white version was unveiled for the 2022 Winter Classic.

Prior to the 2020–21 season, the Blues unveiled a "Reverse Retro" alternate uniform based on the design worn from 1995 to 1998, but with a red base. A second "Reverse Retro" uniform was released in the 2022–23 season, this time based on the prototype uniforms the team first leaked in 1966 before eventually releasing the more longlasting "blue note" uniforms. The uniforms, which had the team name written around the primitive "blue note" logo along with contrasting stripes, had a gold base.

During the Blues' 2025 Winter Classic appearance, the team wore vintage white uniforms with light blue and gold chest and sleeve stripes. The "ST. LOUIS" wordmark in gold, based on the prototype uniform from 1966, was placed along the blue chest stripe, and a vintage-style Blues logo was added on the left shoulder.

Before the 2025–26 season, the Blues unveiled new uniform styles heavily based on the team's alternate 'heritage' uniform from the 2017 Winter Classic, as well as its vintage white counterpart from the 2022 Winter Classic. The design returned to the original blue and yellow palette from its earlier years, with the 1998 'blue note' logo recolored to reflect the updated color scheme. The previous blue and navy-trimmed home uniform was retained as an alternate. Three alternate logos were introduced: a stylized fleur-de-lis with a musical note, an interlocking "STL" treble clef design, and a trumpet featuring the Gateway Arch and water representing the Mississippi River.

The Blues unveiled a "Hometown Remix" uniform during the 2026–27 season, using a modified Gateway Arch roundel logo from their 2008–2016 navy alternate as its crest. The design featured a black base with blue and silver accents in an homage to the dark waters of the Mississippi River.

The logo used on the Blues' jerseys from 1967 to 1984. The current logo (shown in the infobox), is similar, but with the slightly darker shade of blue used since 1984.

The logo used on the Blues' jerseys from 1987 to 1998.

=== Mascot ===
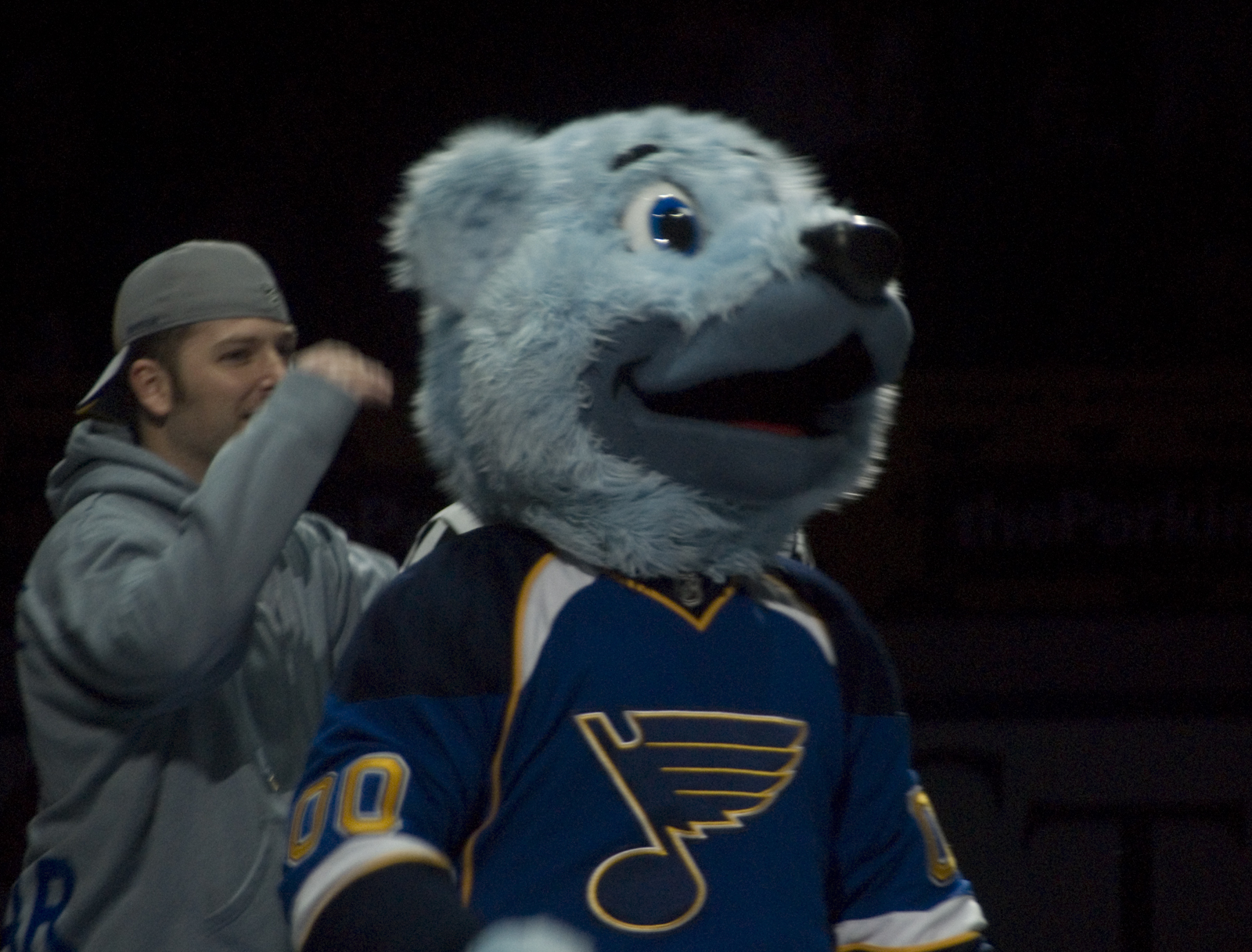
Introduced in October 2007, Louie the Bear is the mascot for the Blues.

Louie is the mascot of the St. Louis Blues. He was introduced on October 10, 2007. On November 3, 2007, the fans voted on his name on the Blues' web site. Louie is a blue polar bear and wears a Blues jersey with his name on the back, and the numbers "00".

=== Radio and television ===
Originally, the Blues aired their games on KPLR-TV and KMOX radio, with team patron Gus Kyle calling games alongside St Louis broadcasting legend Jack Buck. Buck elected to leave the booth after one season, though, and was replaced by another famed announcer in Dan Kelly. This setup—Kelly as commentator, with either Kyle, Bob Plager, or Noel Picard (whose heavy French-Canadian accent became famous, such as pronouncing owner Sid Salomon III "Sid the Turd" instead of "Third") joining as an analyst, simulcast on KMOX and KPLR—continued through the 1975–76 season, then simulcast on KMOX and KDNL-TV for the next three seasons. KMOX is a 50,000-watt clear-channel station that reaches almost all of North America at night, allowing Kelly to become a celebrity in both the United States and Canada. Indeed, many of the Blues' players liked the fact that their families could hear the games on KMOX.

From 1979 to 1981, the radio and television broadcasts were separated for the first time since the inaugural season, with Kelly doing the radio broadcasts and Eli Gold hired to do the television. Following the 1980–81 season, the television broadcasts moved from KDNL to NBC affiliate KSD-TV for the 1981–82 season, produced by Sports Network Incorporated (SNI), owned and operated by Greg Maracek who did the broadcasts with Channel 5 sportscaster Ron Jacober. The broadcasts failed to produce a profit and then returned to KPLR for the 1982 NHL playoffs and the 1982–83 season before returning to KDNL (currently St. Louis' ABC affiliate) for the 1983–84 season, the first under the ownership of Harry Ornest. The Blues returned to KPLR in 1986–87.

In 1985, Ornest, wanting more broadcast revenue, put the radio rights up for bid. A new company who had purchased KXOK won the bid for a three-year contract, and Kelly moved over from KMOX to do the games on KXOK. However, the station was never financially competitive in the market. Additionally, fans complained they could not hear the station at night (it had to readjust its coverage due to a glut of clear channels on adjacent frequencies). KXOK backed out of the contract after just 2 years, and the Blues immediately went back to KMOX, who held the rights until 2000. Dan Kelly continued to broadcast the games on radio, but he was diagnosed with lung cancer in October 1988 and died on February 10, 1989. After his death, Ron Jacober (who had left Channel 5 to be KXOK's sports director in 1985 then left for KMOX in 1987) finished the season as the radio play-by-play announcer before John Kelly took that position. Furthermore, Ken Wilson became St. Louis Blues' lead television play-by-play announcer alongside former Blues' players Joe Micheletti, Bruce Affleck, and Bernie Federko.

A three-year agreement was reached in January 1995 with Prime Sports Midwest, the forerunner of FanDuel Sports Network Midwest, to carry up to 25 games per season.

The long-term partnership between KMOX and the Blues had its problems, however, namely during spring when the ever-popular St. Louis Cardinals began their season. Blues games, many of which were crucial to playoff berths, would often be pre-empted for spring training coverage. Angry at having to play "second fiddle", the Blues elected to leave for KTRS in 2000. However, in an ironic twist the Cards purchased a controlling interest in KTRS in 2005, and once again preferred to air preseason baseball over regular season ice hockey. In response, the Blues moved back to KMOX starting in the 2006–07 season. The season of 2008–09 saw the Blues play their last game on KPLR, which had the rights since the 1986–87 season (except for the 1996–97 season on CBS affiliate KMOV), electing to move all their games to FS Midwest, starting with the 2009–10 season. The Cardinals moved back to KMOX in the 2011 season, with conflicting games moved to KYKY, an FM station owned by the same group as KMOX.

Since the 2019–20 preseason, WXOS (101 ESPN) has been the flagship radio station for the Blues. Chris Kerber and Joe Vitale are the current radio broadcast team.

Ahead of the 2025–26 season, the Blues announced that they will employ a radio and television simulcast of their games, with Kerber and Vitale serving as game announcers. Consequently, John Kelly's 20-year tenure (since 2005) as the "Voice of the Blues" on television came to an end, as the team did not renew his contract.

== Traditions ==
The Blues have a tradition of live organ music. Jeremy Boyer, the Blues organist, plays a Glenn Miller arrangement of W. C. Handy's "St. Louis Blues" in its entirety before games and a short version at the end of every period, followed by "When the Saints Go Marching In." Boyer also plays the latter song on the organ after Blues goals, with fans replacing the word "Saints" with "Blues." On October 1, 2018, it was reported that, for the upcoming season, a new goal song recorded by St. Louis-based band The Urge, "The Blues Have The Urge," would be played after Blues goals, immediately following the traditional organ music.

At the end of the national anthem before every home game, the words "the home of the brave" are drowned out by fans with "the home of the Blues."

Starting in 2014, the team introduced a win song in the form of Pitbull's "Don't Stop the Party", but from 2016 to 2018, the win song was "Song 2" by Blur after public backlash against using a Pitbull song. Beginning in 2018, the win song has been the aforementioned song recorded by The Urge. However, during the 2019 playoffs, Laura Branigan's "Gloria" was played first before The Urge song.

The Blues were one of the last teams to add a goal horn, doing so during the 1992–93 season at the St. Louis Arena. All of these traditions carried over to the Kiel Center (now known as Enterprise Center) in 1994. After each goal, a bell is rung and each of the goals are counted by the crowd. Since 1990, Ron Baechle, also known as the "Towel Man" or "Towel Guy," has celebrated each goal by counting with the bell and throwing a towel into the crowd from section 314.

The team also has a long tradition of fan-produced programs, sold outside the arena and providing an often biting, sarcastic, humor-filled alternative to team- and League-produced periodicals. The longest-running fan publication, Game Night Revue, was created by a group of fans in the mold of the Chicago Blackhawks' Blue Line Magazine. It operated for over 10 years, from 1994 to 2005, when its owner decided not to resume the magazine after the 2004–05 NHL lockout (one final oversized "goodbye" issue was distributed the first two home games of the 2005–06 season). After hockey resumed in 2005, a few months after GNR's final issue, a new publication, St. Louis Game Time, was formed by several former GNR staffers.

Starting after a couple of players heard "Gloria" by Laura Branigan, after their win in Philadelphia on January 3, 2019, the team started to use the song after every home win, and lasted all the way up to their Stanley Cup win. The song has since been retired; the last time they played it was during the raising of the Stanley Cup championship banner ceremony on October 2, 2019.

On February 9, 2019, another tradition was born. During the third period, the Blues were winning by a large margin against the visiting Nashville Predators. The Enterprise Center was electric and buzzing with excitement with anticipation of the win. Blues director of entertainment, Jason Pippi, commented that playing "Country Roads" by John Denver "was a bit of an mistake... because people love to sing along to that song". The mistake was that play resumed before the chorus was over and the music had to stop. However, despite the music stopping, the loyal Blues fans in attendance continued to sing loudly. It was loud enough, TV cameras picked up the song loud and clear. Fox Sports Midwest color commentator, Darren Pang, exclaimed he "just loved the crowd, they're singing!". "Country Roads" has been played during every home game since then, at approximately the 15:00 minute mark of the third period, regardless of the current score. Jason Pippi stated "its just a testament to the passion Blues fans bring each and every night... to the Cup (Stanley Cup) maybe?" The Blues won their first Stanley Cup in franchise history later that season.

After each home win, the entire Blues team skates to center ice and in unison, raise their sticks and clap, while the goal horn blares, to thank the Blues fans in attendance and watching on TV. It has been called the "Fan Salute" by some.

== Season-by-season record ==
This is a partial list of the last five seasons completed by the Blues. For the full season-by-season history, see List of St. Louis Blues seasons

Note: GP = Games played, W = Wins, L = Losses, OTL = Overtime losses, Pts = Points, GF = Goals for, GA = Goals against

Season	GP	W	L	OTL	Pts	GF	GA	Finish	Playoffs
2021–22	82	49	22	11	109	311	242	3rd, Central	Lost in second round, 2–4 (Avalanche)
2022–23	82	37	38	7	81	263	301	6th, Central	Did not qualify
2023–24	82	43	33	6	92	239	250	5th, Central	Did not qualify
2024–25	82	44	30	8	96	254	233	5th, Central	Lost in first round, 3–4 (Jets)
2025–26	82	37	33	12	86	231	258	5th, Central	Did not qualify

== Players and personnel ==
=== Current roster ===
Updated November 16, 2026

No.	Nat	Player	Pos	S/G	Age	Acquired	Birthplace
72	(Canada)	Justin Barron	D	R	25	2026	Halifax, Nova Scotia
29	(Sweden)	Jonatan Berggren	RW	L	26	2025	Uppsala, Sweden
50	(Canada)	Jordan Binnington	G	L	33	2011	Richmond Hill, Ontario
6	(Sweden)	Philip Broberg (A)	D	L	25	2024	Örebro, Sweden
89	(Russia)	Pavel Buchnevich	LW	L	31	2021	Cherepovets, Russia
25	(United States)	Brandon Carlo	D	R	29	2026	Colorado Springs, Colorado
65	(Canada)	Dillon Dubé	C	L	28	2026	Golden, British Columbia
15	(Slovakia)	Dalibor Dvorský	RW	L	21	2023	Zvolen, Slovakia
17	(United States)	Cam Fowler	D	L	34	2024	Windsor, Ontario
30	(Canada)	Joel Hofer	G	L	26	2018	Winnipeg, Manitoba
81	(Canada)	Dylan Holloway (A)	LW	L	25	2024	Calgary, Alberta
49	(Canada)	Ross Johnston	LW	L	32	2026	Charlottetown, Prince Edward Island
65	(Finland)	Aleksanteri Kaskimaki	C	L	22	2022	Espoo, Finland
23	(Canada)	Logan Mailloux	D	R	23	2025	Belle River, Ontario
77	(Canada)	Connor McMichael	LW	L	25	2026	Ajax, Ontario
83	(Canada)	Mason McTavish	C	L	23	2026	Zurich, Switzerland
63	(Canada)	Jake Neighbours (A)	LW	L	24	2020	Calgary, Alberta
55	(Canada)	Colton Parayko (A)	D	R	33	2012	St. Albert, Alberta
43	(Sweden)	Calle Rosén	D	L	32	2021	Växjö, Sweden
21	(United States)	Jimmy Snuggerud	RW	R	22	2022	Minneapolis, Minnesota
22	(Switzerland)	Pius Suter	C	L	30	2025	Zurich, Switzerland
18	(Canada)	Robert Thomas (C)	C	R	27	2017	Aurora, Ontario
13	(Russia)	Alexey Toropchenko	RW	L	27	2017	Moscow, Russia
75	(Canada)	Tyler Tucker	D	L	26	2018	Thunder Bay, Ontario
26	(Australia)	Nathan Walker	LW	L	32	2019	Cardiff, United Kingdom

=== Team captains ===
- Al Arbour, 1967–1970, 1971
- Red Berenson, 1970–1971, 1976, 1977–1978
- Jim Roberts, 1971–1972
- Barclay Plager, 1972–1976
- Garry Unger, 1976–1977
- Barry Gibbs, 1978–1979
- Brian Sutter, 1979–1988
- Bernie Federko, 1988–1989
- Rick Meagher, 1989–1990
- Scott Stevens, 1990–1991
- Garth Butcher, 1991–1992
- Brett Hull, 1992–1995
- Shayne Corson, 1995–1996
- Wayne Gretzky, 1996
- Chris Pronger, 1997–2003
- Al MacInnis, 2003–2004
- Dallas Drake, 2005–2007
- Eric Brewer, 2008–2011
- David Backes, 2011–2016
- Alex Pietrangelo, 2016–2020
- Ryan O'Reilly, 2020–2023
- Brayden Schenn, 2023–2026
- Robert Thomas, 2026–present

=== Hall of Fame ===
The St. Louis Blues acknowledge an affiliation with a number of inductees to the Hockey Hall of Fame, including 26 former players and seven builders of the sport. The seven individuals recognized as builders by the Hall of Fame include former Blues executives, general managers, head coaches, and owners. In addition to players and builders, the team recognizes an affiliation with two broadcasters who were awarded the Foster Hewitt Memorial Award from the Hockey Hall of Fame. Dan Kelly, the Blues' radio play-by-play announcer, was awarded the first Blues broadcaster to receive the award in 1989. John Davidson, received the award in 2009 for his contributions in television broadcasting.

Players

- Glenn Anderson
- Tom Barrasso
- Martin Brodeur
- Guy Carbonneau
- Bernie Federko
- Grant Fuhr
- Doug Gilmour
- Wayne Gretzky
- Glenn Hall
- Doug Harvey
- Dale Hawerchuk
- Phil Housley
- Brett Hull
- Paul Kariya
- Guy Lapointe
- Al MacInnis
- Dickie Moore
- Joe Mullen
- Václav Nedomanský
- Adam Oates
- Jacques Plante
- Chris Pronger
- Brendan Shanahan
- Peter Šťastný
- Scott Stevens
- Keith Tkachuk
- Pierre Turgeon

Builders

- Scotty Bowman
- Jim Devellano
- Cliff Fletcher
- Emile Francis
- Ken Hitchcock
- Roger Neilson
- Lynn Patrick

=== St. Louis Blues Hall of Fame ===
Beginning in 2023, the Blues established their own team Hall of Fame.

2023 inductees

- Red Berenson
- Scotty Bowman
- Bernie Federko
- Bob Gassoff
- Glenn Hall
- Brett Hull
- Dan Kelly
- Al MacInnis
- Barclay Plager
- Bob Plager
- Chris Pronger
- Sid Salomon Jr.
- Sid Salomon III
- Brian Sutter
- Garry Unger

2024 inductees

- Pavol Demitra
- Mike Liut
- Keith Tkachuk

2025 inductees

- Wayne Babych
- Curtis Joseph
- Jim Roberts

2026 inductees

- Al Arbour
- Barret Jackman
- Alexander Steen

=== Retired numbers ===
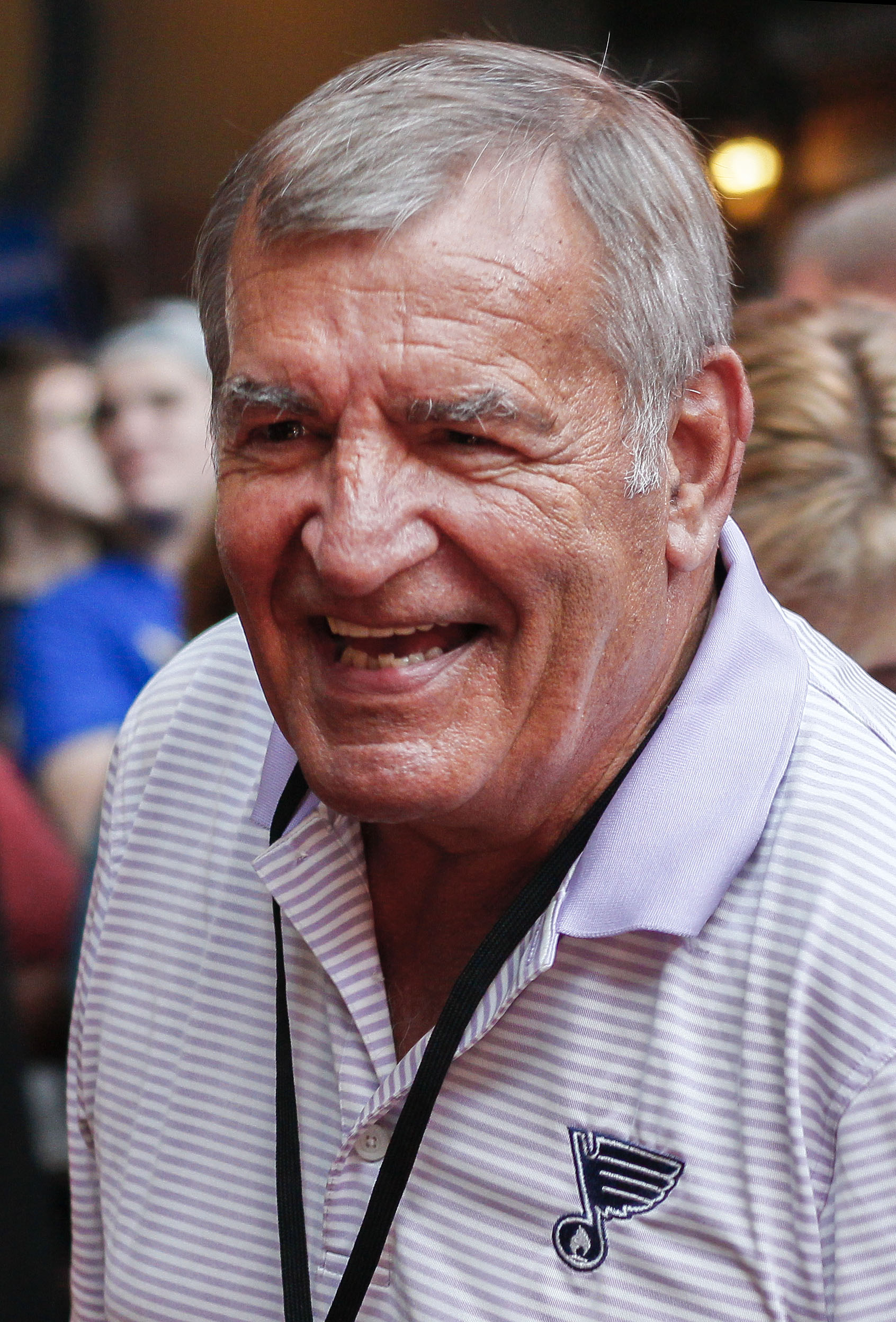
The Blues retired Bob Plager's number on February 2, 2017. He played as a defenseman with the team from 1967 to 1978; following his retirement, he worked for the club in various capacities until his death in 2021.

The following numbers have been retired from use within the St. Louis Blues:

St. Louis Blues retired numbers
No.	Player	Position	Career	Date retired
2	Al MacInnis	D	1994–2004	April 9, 2006
3	Bob Gassoff	D	1974–1977	October 1, 1977
5	Bob Plager	D	1967–1978	February 2, 2017
8	Barclay Plager	D	1967–1977	March 24, 1981
11	Brian Sutter	LW	1976–1988	December 30, 1988
16	Brett Hull	RW	1987–1998	December 5, 2006
24	Bernie Federko	C	1976–1989	March 16, 1991
44	Chris Pronger	D	1995–2004	January 17, 2022

In addition to the aforementioned numbers, the NHL also retired Wayne Gretzky's number 99 from use for all of its members teams, including the Blues, at the 2000 NHL All-Star Game. Gretzky had previously played for the Blues in 1996, although the Blues did not retire his number prior to its league-wide retirement.

==== Numbers honored ====
- 7 – Garry Unger, Red Berenson, Joe Mullen and Keith Tkachuk, recognized with a mural of the four players in the lower seating bowl. Honored on March 7, 2011.
- 14 – Doug Wickenheiser, LW, 1984–1987, number honored and no longer issued. Recognized with a banner in the Enterprise Center rafters. Honored on January 21, 1999.
- Dan Kelly, broadcaster, 1968–1989, recognized with an honorary shamrock that hangs from the rafters at Enterprise Center.

=== First-round draft picks ===
- 1967: None (passed on their opportunity to make a selection)
- 1968: Gary Edwards (6th overall)
- 1971: Gene Carr (4th overall)
- 1972: Wayne Merrick (9th overall)
- 1973: John Davidson (5th overall)
- 1976: Bernie Federko (7th overall)
- 1977: Scott Campbell (9th overall)
- 1978: Wayne Babych (3rd overall)
- 1979: Perry Turnbull (2nd overall)
- 1980: Rik Wilson (12th overall)
- 1981: Marty Ruff (20th overall)
- 1983: None (did not participate)
- 1986: Jocelyn Lemieux (10th overall)
- 1987: Keith Osborne (12th overall)
- 1988: Rod Brind'Amour (9th overall)
- 1989: Jason Marshall (9th overall)
- 1996: Marty Reasoner (14th overall)
- 1998: Christian Backman (24th overall)
- 1999: Barret Jackman (17th overall)
- 2000: Jeff Taffe (30th overall)
- 2003: Shawn Belle (30th overall)
- 2004: Marek Schwarz (17th overall)
- 2005: T. J. Oshie (24th overall)
- 2006: Erik Johnson (1st overall), Patrik Berglund (25th overall)
- 2007: Lars Eller (13th overall), Ian Cole (18th overall), David Perron (26th overall)
- 2008: Alex Pietrangelo (4th overall)
- 2009: David Rundblad (17th overall)
- 2010: Jaden Schwartz (14th overall), Vladimir Tarasenko (16th overall)
- 2012: Jordan Schmaltz (25th overall)
- 2014: Robby Fabbri (21st overall)
- 2016: Tage Thompson (26th overall)
- 2017: Robert Thomas (20th overall), Klim Kostin (31st overall)
- 2018: Dominik Bokk (25th overall)
- 2020: Jake Neighbours (26th overall)
- 2021: Zachary Bolduc (17th overall)
- 2022: Jimmy Snuggerud (23rd overall)
- 2023: Dalibor Dvorský (10th overall), Otto Stenberg (25th overall), Theo Lindstein (29th overall)
- 2024: Adam Jiříček (16th overall)
- 2025: Justin Carbonneau (19th overall)
- 2026: Tynan Lawrence (11th overall), Maddox Dagenais (16th overall)

== Awards and trophies ==
Stanley Cup

- 2018–19

Presidents' Trophy

- 1999–2000

Clarence S. Campbell Bowl

- 1968–69, 1969–70, 2018–19

Bill Masterton Memorial Trophy

- Blake Dunlop: 1980–81
- Jamie McLennan: 1997–98

Calder Memorial Trophy

- Barret Jackman: 2002–03

Conn Smythe Trophy

- Glenn Hall: 1967–68
- Ryan O'Reilly: 2018–19

Frank J. Selke Trophy

- Rick Meagher: 1989–90
- Ryan O'Reilly: 2018–19

Hart Memorial Trophy

- Brett Hull: 1990–91
- Chris Pronger: 1999–2000

Jack Adams Award

- Gordon "Red" Berenson: 1980–81
- Brian Sutter: 1990–91
- Joel Quenneville: 1999–2000
- Ken Hitchcock: 2011–12

James Norris Memorial Trophy

- Al MacInnis: 1998–99
- Chris Pronger: 1999–2000

King Clancy Memorial Trophy

- Kelly Chase: 1997–98

Lady Byng Memorial Trophy

- Phil Goyette: 1969–70
- Brett Hull: 1989–90
- Pavol Demitra: 1999–2000

Lester B. Pearson Award

- Mike Liut: 1980–81
- Brett Hull: 1990–91

Lester Patrick Trophy

- Larry Pleau: 2001–02

NHL General Manager of the Year Award

- Doug Armstrong: 2011–12

NHL Plus/Minus Award

- Paul Cavallini: 1989–90
- Chris Pronger: 1997–98, 1999–2000

Vezina Trophy

- Glenn Hall and Jacques Plante: 1968–69

William M. Jennings Trophy

- Roman Turek: 1999–2000
- Brian Elliott and Jaroslav Halák: 2011–12

== Franchise records ==
=== Scoring leaders ===
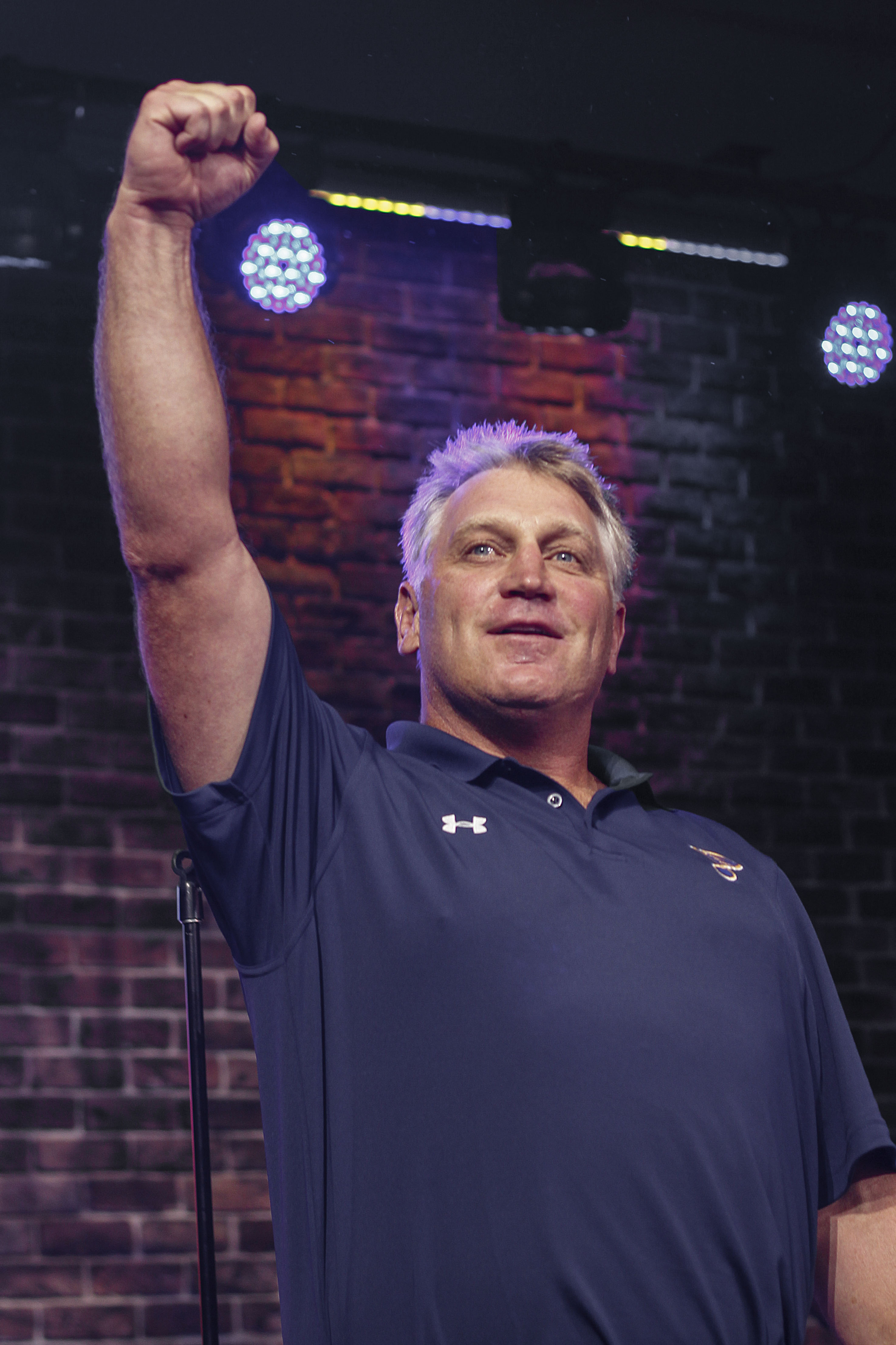
Brett Hull is the franchise's all-time goals leader, and is second only to Bernie Federko in both points and assists.

These are the top-ten point-scorers in franchise regular season history. Figures are updated after each completed NHL regular season.

- * – current Blues player

Note: Pos = Position; GP = Games played; G = Goals; A = Assists; Pts = Points; P/G = Points per game

Points
Player	Pos	GP	G	A	Pts	P/G
Bernie Federko	C	927	352	721	1,073	1.16
Brett Hull	RW	744	527	409	936	1.26
Brian Sutter	LW	779	303	333	636	.82
Garry Unger	C	662	292	283	575	.87
Vladimir Tarasenko	RW	644	262	291	553	.86
Alexander Steen	LW	765	195	301	496	.65
Pavol Demitra	RW	494	204	289	493	1.00
David Perron	LW	673	196	269	465	.69
Brayden Schenn	C	650	181	284	465	.72
David Backes	RW	727	206	254	460	.63
Robert Thomas*	C	530	132	328	460	.87

Goals
Player	Pos	G
Brett Hull	RW	527
Bernie Federko	C	352
Brian Sutter	LW	303
Garry Unger	C	292
Vladimir Tarasenko	RW	262
Keith Tkachuk	LW	208
David Backes	RW	206
Pavol Demitra	RW	204
David Perron	LW	196
Alexander Steen	LW	195

Assists
Player	Pos	A
Bernie Federko	C	721
Brett Hull	RW	409
Alex Pietrangelo	D	341
Brian Sutter	LW	333
Robert Thomas*	C	328
Al MacInnis	D	325
Alexander Steen	LW	301
Vladimir Tarasenko	RW	291
Pavol Demitra	RW	289
Brayden Schenn	C	284

=== Goaltending leaders ===
These are the top-ten goaltenders in franchise history by wins. Figures are updated after each completed NHL regular season.

- * – current Blues player

Note: GP = Games played; W = Wins; L = Losses; T/O = Ties/Overtime losses; GA = Goal against; GAA = Goals against average; SA = Shots against; SV% = Save percentage; SO = Shutouts

Goaltenders
Player	GP	W	L	T/O	GA	GAA	SA	SV%	SO
Jordan Binnington*	377	186	136	43	1,029	2.83	10,655	.903	19
Mike Liut	347	151	133	52	1,194	3.59	10,359	.885	10
Jake Allen	289	148	94	26	672	2.50	7,681	.913	21
Curtis Joseph	280	137	96	34	810	3.04	8,750	.907	5
Grant Fuhr	249	108	87	41	629	2.68	6,278	.900	11
Brian Elliott	181	104	46	16	334	2.01	4,442	.925	25
Greg Millen	209	85	87	33	708	3.44	5,910	.880	9
Jaroslav Halák	159	83	47	19	338	2.23	4,017	.916	20
Brent Johnson	143	76	47	12	304	2.26	3,143	.903	12
Rick Wamsley	154	75	59	15	515	3.41	4,575	.887	3

=== Individual records ===
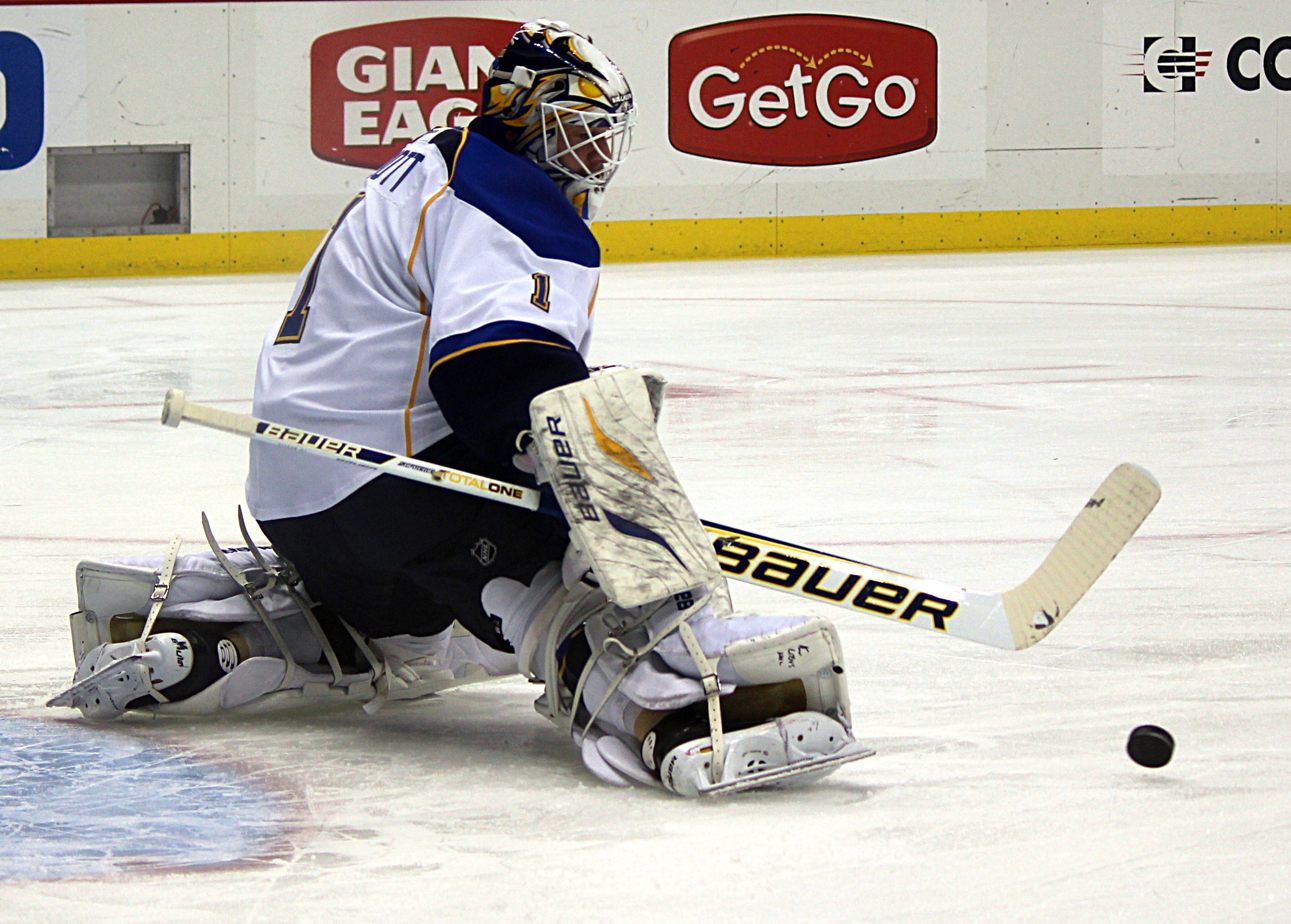
Brian Elliott set the Blues' franchise records for shutouts, best save percentage, and lowest goals-against average in the 2011–12 season.

- Most goals in a season: Brett Hull, 86 (1990–91)
- Most assists in a season: Adam Oates, 90 (1990–91)
- Most points in a season: Brett Hull, 131 (1990–91)
- Most penalty minutes in a season: Bob Gassoff, 306 (1975–76)
- Most points in a season, defenseman: Jeff Brown, 78 (1992–93)
- Most points in a season, rookie: Jorgen Pettersson, 73 (1980–81)
- Most wins in a season: Roman Turek, 42 (1999–2000)
- Most shutouts in a season: Brian Elliott, 9 (2011–12)
- Lowest GAA in a season (min 30 GP): Brian Elliott, 1.56 (2011–12)
- Best SV% in a season (min 30 GP): Brian Elliott, .940 (2011–12)

== See also ==
- List of St. Louis Blues general managers
- List of St. Louis Blues head coaches
- Sports in St. Louis

== Notes ==
Preceded by Washington Capitals	Stanley Cup champions 2018–19	Succeeded by Tampa Bay Lightning
