= Bert Olmstead =

Canadian ice hockey player (1926–2015)

- Hockey Hall of Fame, 1985
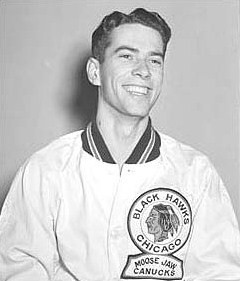
- Olmstead in the 1940s
- Born: September 4, 1926 Sceptre, Saskatchewan, Canada
- Died: November 16, 2015 (aged 89) High River, Alberta, Canada
- Height: 6 ft 2 in (188 cm)
- Weight: 175 lb (79 kg; 12 st 7 lb)
- Position: Left wing
- Shot: Left
- Played for: Chicago Black Hawks; Montreal Canadiens; Toronto Maple Leafs
- Playing career: 1948–1962

Murray Albert Olmstead (September 4, 1926 – November 16, 2015) was a Canadian professional ice hockey player who was a left winger for the Montreal Canadiens, Chicago Black Hawks and Toronto Maple Leafs in the National Hockey League (NHL) for 13 seasons. He was inducted into the Hockey Hall of Fame in 1985. Olmstead began his career with the Black Hawks in 1949. In December 1950, he was traded to the Montreal Canadiens via Detroit. Olmstead had his best statistical years playing for Montreal, leading the league in assists in 1954–55 with 48, and setting a league record for assists with 56 the following season. During this time he frequently played on Montreal's top line with Jean Beliveau and Bernie Geoffrion. Olmstead was claimed in the 1958 NHL Intra-League Draft by the Toronto Maple Leafs, and played there until his retirement in 1962.

In the 1967–68 season, Olmstead served as coach of the expansion Oakland Seals. Olmstead played in the Stanley Cup Final in 11 of his 14 seasons in the NHL, winning it five times. He won it four times with Montreal, in 1953, 1956, 1957, 1958, and once with Toronto, in 1962, which was his last season.

== Early life ==
Olmstead was born on September 4, 1926, in Sceptre, Saskatchewan, a small village with a population of less than 200, in southwestern Saskatchewan. In 1944, at the age of 18, he moved to Moose Jaw, Saskatchewan, to play junior hockey. In his first year, Olmstead and the Moose Jaw Canucks challenged for the Memorial Cup, after finishing the playoffs with a 15–1 record. They were unsuccessful in the series against the St. Michael's Majors. Olmstead had 10 goals and eight assists in the 17 playoff games he played. He played another season in Moose Jaw, before being assigned to the Kansas City Pla-Mors of the United States Hockey League (USHL) by the Chicago Black Hawks.

== Playing career ==
=== Chicago Black Hawks ===
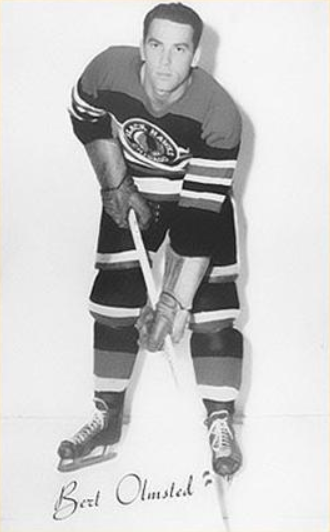
Olmstead for Chicago Black Hawks, c. 1949–1951

Olmstead played three full seasons for Kansas City, and part of another, later in 1950, for the Milwaukee Sea Gulls. In the 1946–47 season, Olmstead joined the Pla-Mors, finishing the season with 42 points in 60 games. In 1948–49, the Canadiens, who had originally sponsored him and owned his rights, traded him to the Chicago Black Hawks. The same season, Olmstead made his NHL debut, called up after scoring 33 goals and 44 assists, for 77 points, in 52 games with the Pla-Mors. Debuting on Christmas Day 1948, he played nine games for the Black Hawks and collected two assists. Olmstead played the entire following season for the Black Hawks, appearing in 70 games and scoring 20 goals.

Olmstead split the 1950–51 season between four teams, playing for all but one of them. He began the season playing for the Black Hawks franchise, playing 15 games in the NHL and 12 in the USHL, for the Milwaukee Sea Gulls. On December 2, 1950, Olmstead, with Vic Stasiuk, was traded to the Detroit Red Wings, in exchange for Lee Fogolin and Steve Black. On December 19, 1950, 17 days after the trade to Detroit, he was traded again, without ever suiting up for the Red Wings, to Montreal, for Leo Gravelle. Olmstead would never leave the NHL until his retirement in 1962, playing 39 games that season on a line with Maurice Richard and Elmer Lach, scoring 38 points. Olmstead also appeared in 11 playoff games, collecting six points, as the Canadiens lost the best-of-seven Stanley Cup Final to the Toronto Maple Leafs in five games.

=== Montreal Canadiens ===
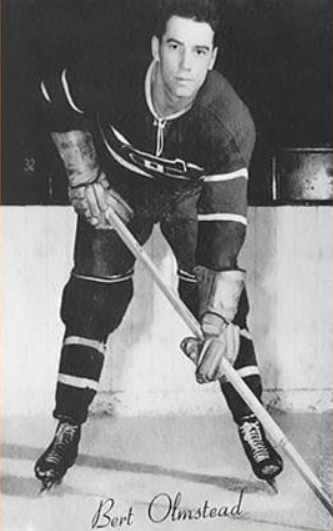
Olmstead in 1950s photo for Montreal Canadiens

Olmstead and the Canadiens appeared in the Stanley Cup Final again in the 1951–52 season, losing to the Detroit Red Wings; after recording 35 points in 69 regular season games, Olmstead was limited to an assist in 11 playoff games. In his third season with the Canadiens, Olmstead won the Stanley Cup for the first time. Earning 45 points in 69 games, he was named to the Second All-Star Team. In the last game of the season, Olmstead bodychecked Gordie Howe, stopping him from tying Maurice Richard's record of 50 goals in a season. Olmstead played all the 70 games in the next two seasons, scoring 52 and 58 points in the 1953–54 and 1954–55 seasons, respectively. The Canadiens lost to the Red Wings once more in the Stanley Cup Finals, in both seasons. In the 1954–55 season, Olmstead led the league in assists, with 48, as Montreal lost another Stanley Cup Final to Detroit.

On January 9, 1954, Olmstead tied an NHL record when he scored eight points in a game against Chicago in a 12-1 home win at the Montréal Forum (he got four goals and four assists).

The 1955–56 season saw the start of Montreal's five consecutive Stanley Cup championships. In that season, Olmstead played on a line with Jean Béliveau and Bernie "Boom Boom" Geoffrion. He set a record for assists, with 56, and also scored eight points in game, recording four goals and four assists, tying Rocket Richard's record. This record would be broken in 1976 by Darryl Sittler, who scored six goals and four assists, for ten points. As well as winning the Stanley Cup, Olmstead was again named to the Second All-Star Team.

Olmstead won two more Stanley Cups in the 1956–57 and 1957–58 seasons. After the conclusion of the 1957–58 seasons, doctors informed him that he had no strength left in his knees, and that he should contemplate retirement. As a result of this prognosis, the Canadiens left Olmstead unprotected in the Intra-League Draft, and he was claimed by Billy Reay, the head coach of the Canadiens' chief rival, the Toronto Maple Leafs.

=== Toronto Maple Leafs ===
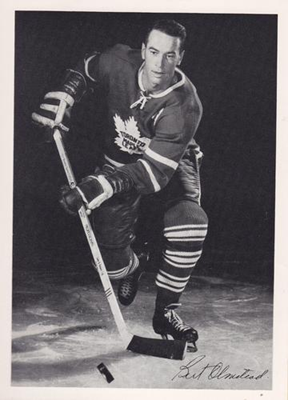
Olmstead in 1960 photo for Toronto Maple Leafs

Early in the 1958–59 season, Punch Imlach, the assistant general manager of the Leafs, fired Reay, installed himself as head coach, and appointed Olmstead as the playing assistant coach. This meant that while Imlach coached the team during games, Olmstead was in charge of the practices; however, Olmstead only lasted three months as assistant coach, resigning to devote more time to improving his play. The same season, the Leafs went on a long winning streak in order to qualify for the playoffs, but they lost to the Canadiens in the finals. After losing in the Finals the next season, and falling short of the Finals the next season, Olmstead won his fifth and final Stanley Cup in 1962, missing two months of the season with a broken shoulder, and being limited to only four out of the 12 playoff games.

== Retirement ==
Following his fifth Stanley Cup win, with Toronto, the New York Rangers claimed Olmstead in the Intra-League Draft on June 4, 1962. This came as a surprise to Olmstead, who refused to report to the team. The Canadiens offered to acquire him from the Rangers, within a month; Olmstead demanded an immediate trade. Since no deal came, he retired at the age of 35. During his 14-year NHL career, Olmstead scored 181 goals and 421 assists, for 602 points; in the playoffs, he collected 59 points, in 115 games. In his 14 seasons, Olmstead appeared in the Stanley Cup Final 11 times. He won five times, four of them with the Montreal Canadiens, and once with the Toronto Maple Leafs.

After retiring from playing, Olmstead attempted coaching. In the 1965–66 season, Olmstead coached the Vancouver Canucks, of the WHL; he finished with a 33–35–4 record, for a .486 winning percentage. In the 1967–68 season, Olmstead coached the expansion Oakland Seals, in the NHL. Olmstead did not last the full season, stepping aside after 64 games, having only won 11 games, with a .297 winning percentage.

== Legacy ==
Known as "Dirty Bertie" because of his physical playing style, Olmstead was a power forward, making hard hits and winning battles in the corners. He was not a very good skater, and thus he had to compensate by bodychecking. Olmstead was not regularly involved in fights, but in the ones he participated, the majority were started with his hits.

Olmstead was inducted into the Hockey Hall of Fame in 1985. Olmstead, with his wife Nora, visited the town of Okotoks, Alberta on August 13, 2005, with the Stanley Cup. He had previously declined to spend a day with it, believing that it was being given to much older winners only because of the lockout. Olmstead also noted, at the end of the day, that he was happy to have the Stanley Cup again. Olmstead died at his home in High River, Alberta on November 16, 2015, due to complications from a stroke.

== Career statistics ==
			Regular season					Playoffs
Season	Team	League	GP	G	A	Pts	PIM	GP	G	A	Pts	PIM
1944–45	Moose Jaw Canucks	S-SJHL	16	0	3	3	8	4	2	0	2	8
1944–45	Moose Jaw Canucks	M-Cup	—	—	—	—	—	17	10	8	18	18
1945–46	Moose Jaw Canucks	S-SJHL	18	24	19	43	32	4	0	1	1	6
1945–46	Moose Jaw Canucks	M-Cup	—	—	—	—	—	8	2	8	10	6
1946–47	Kansas City Pla-Mors	USHL	60	27	15	42	34	12	2	3	5	4
1947–48	Kansas City Pla-Mors	USHL	66	26	26	52	42	7	1	4	5	0
1948–49	Chicago Black Hawks	NHL	9	0	2	2	4	—	—	—	—	—
1948–49	Kansas City Pla-Mors	USHL	52	33	44	77	54	2	0	1	1	0
1949–50	Chicago Black Hawks	NHL	70	20	29	49	40	—	—	—	—	—
1950–51	Chicago Black Hawks	NHL	15	2	1	3	0	—	—	—	—	—
1950–51	Milwaukee Seagulls	USHL	12	8	7	15	11	—	—	—	—	—
1950–51	Montreal Canadiens	NHL	39	16	22	38	50	11	2	4	6	9
1951–52	Montreal Canadiens	NHL	69	7	28	35	49	11	0	1	1	4
1952–53	Montreal Canadiens	NHL	69	17	28	45	83	12	2	2	4	4
1953–54	Montreal Canadiens	NHL	70	15	37	52	85	11	0	1	1	19
1954–55	Montreal Canadiens	NHL	70	10	48	58	103	12	0	4	4	21
1955–56	Montreal Canadiens	NHL	70	14	56	70	94	10	4	10	14	8
1956–57	Montreal Canadiens	NHL	64	15	33	48	74	10	0	9	9	13
1957–58	Montreal Canadiens	NHL	57	9	28	37	71	9	0	3	3	0
1958–59	Toronto Maple Leafs	NHL	70	10	31	41	74	12	4	2	6	13
1959–60	Toronto Maple Leafs	NHL	53	15	21	36	63	10	3	4	7	0
1960–61	Toronto Maple Leafs	NHL	67	18	34	52	84	3	1	2	3	10
1961–62	Toronto Maple Leafs	NHL	56	13	23	36	10	4	0	1	1	0
NHL totals			848	181	421	602	884	115	16	43	59	101

== Coaching record ==
Team	Year	Regular season						Postseason
Team	Year	G	W	L	T	Pts	Finish	Result
Oakland Seals	1967–68	64	11	37	16	(47)	6th in West	(resigned)

Preceded by Rudy Pilous	General manager of the California / Oakland Seals; 1967–68	Succeeded by Frank Selke Jr.
Preceded by Position created	Head coach of the California / Oakland Seals; 1967–68	Succeeded by Gord Fashoway
