= Garry Young (ice hockey) =

Ice Hockey coach and general manager

Garry Young ( January 2, 1936 – September 13, 1994) was a professional ice hockey coach and executive. He was head coach and general manager for the California Golden Seals and head coach for the St. Louis Blues in the National Hockey League.

== Hockey career ==
He began his career as a scout for the Boston Bruins, and was promoted to chief scout and director of player personnel. In 1971, Young was hired by Charlie Finley as the California Golden Seals' new general manager, replacing interim Fred Glover. He named himself coach after he dismissed Vic Stasiuk in the 1972 off-season. He was fired 12 games into the 1972–73 NHL season in light of irregularities surrounding Dick Redmond's contract. He created several copies of the contract with different amounts of compensation for Redmond's services on each. Finley rectified the situation by having Redmond traded to the Chicago Black Hawks and firing Young. Fred Glover was named Young's replacement.

Young was hired by the NHL brass as general manager of the Golden Seals again in February 1974 after Glover resigned. Young's term was again short-lived: he resigned prior to the beginning of the following season. He joined the St. Louis Blues as their head coach later that year, lasting there for parts of two seasons.

He later coached the Peterborough Petes for a single season.

== Personal information ==
Young had four children with his first wife Verna; Steven, Michael, Linda and Paul. And two children with his second wife Susan; Scott and Elaine. Young drowned in a boating accident in 1994. He is buried in Orono, Ontario. Young's grandfather was Weldy Young, an early ice hockey player with the Ottawa Hockey Club in the 1890s.

== Coaching record ==
Team	Year	Regular season						Postseason
Team	Year	G	W	L	T	Pts	Division rank	Result
California Golden Seals	1972–73	12	2	7	3	(48)	8th in West	(fired)
St. Louis Blues	1975–76	69	32	26	11	(84)	2nd in Smythe	Lost in Preliminary Round
St. Louis Blues	1976–77	29	9	15	5	(72)	3rd in Smythe	(fired)
Total		110	43	48	19			

Preceded by Fred Glover	General manager of the California Golden Seals; 1971–72	Succeeded by Fred Glover
Preceded by Vic Stasiuk	Head coach of the California Golden Seals; 1972	Succeeded by Fred Glover
Preceded by Lynn Patrick	Head coach of the St. Louis Blues; 1974–75	Succeeded by Lynn Patrick
