= List of Vancouver Canucks head coaches =

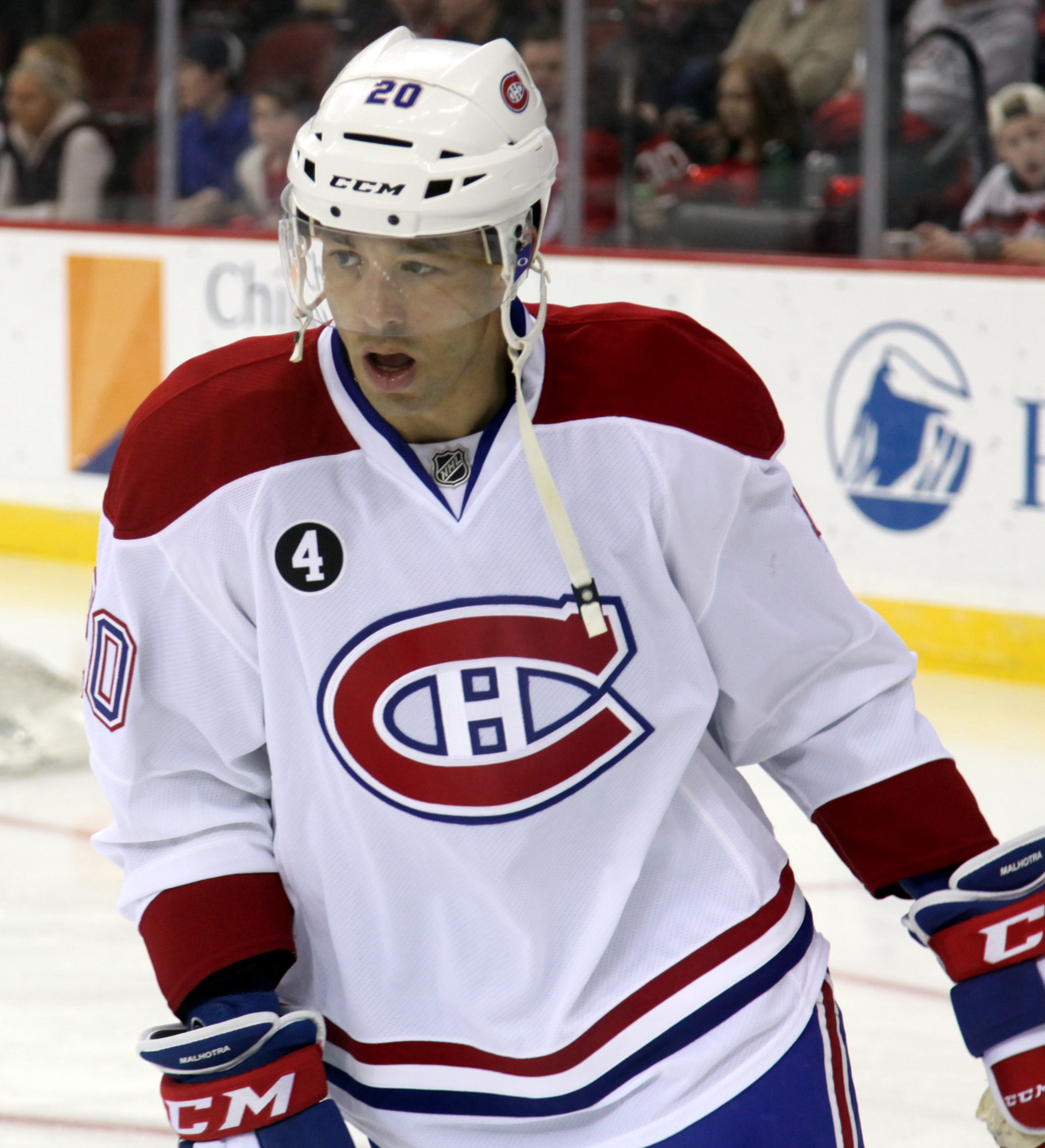
Manny Malhotra is the current head coach of the Canucks.

The Vancouver Canucks are a professional ice hockey team based in Vancouver. They are a member of the Pacific Division in the Western Conference of the National Hockey League (NHL). The team plays its home games at Rogers Arena. The Canucks joined the NHL in 1970 as an expansion team, along with the Buffalo Sabres. They have advanced to the Stanley Cup Final three times but were defeated by the New York Islanders in 1982, the New York Rangers in 1994, and the Boston Bruins in 2011. The Canucks are owned by Francesco Aquilini, and Ryan Johnson is their general manager, and Manny Malhotra is their head coach.

There have been 23 head coaches for the Canucks. The franchise's first head coach was Hal Laycoe, who coached the Canucks for two seasons. Alain Vigneault coached the most games of any Canucks head coach with 540 games and has the most points all-time with the Canucks with 683 points, he also has the most points in a season of any Canucks coach, with 117 in the 2010–11 season. He is followed by Marc Crawford, who has 586 points all-time with the Canucks, while Roger Neilson is the only Hockey Hall of Fame inductee to coach the Canucks. Pat Quinn, Vigneault and Rick Tocchet are the only Canucks head coaches to win a Jack Adams Award with the team. Bill LaForge, who coached at the beginning of the 1984–85 season, has the fewest points with the Canucks (10). Harry Neale served the most terms as head coach of the Canucks with three, while Pat Quinn served twice.

== Key ==
#	Number of coaches (Note: A running total of the number of coaches of the Canucks. Thus any coach who has two or more separate terms as head coach is only counted once.)
GC	Games coached
W	Wins = 2 points
L	Losses = 0 points
T	Ties = 1 point
OT	Overtime/shootout losses = 1 point (Note: Before the 2005–06 season, the NHL instituted a penalty shootout for regular season games that remained tied after a five-minute overtime period, which prevented ties.)
PTS	Points
*	Spent entire NHL coaching career with the Canucks

== Coaches ==
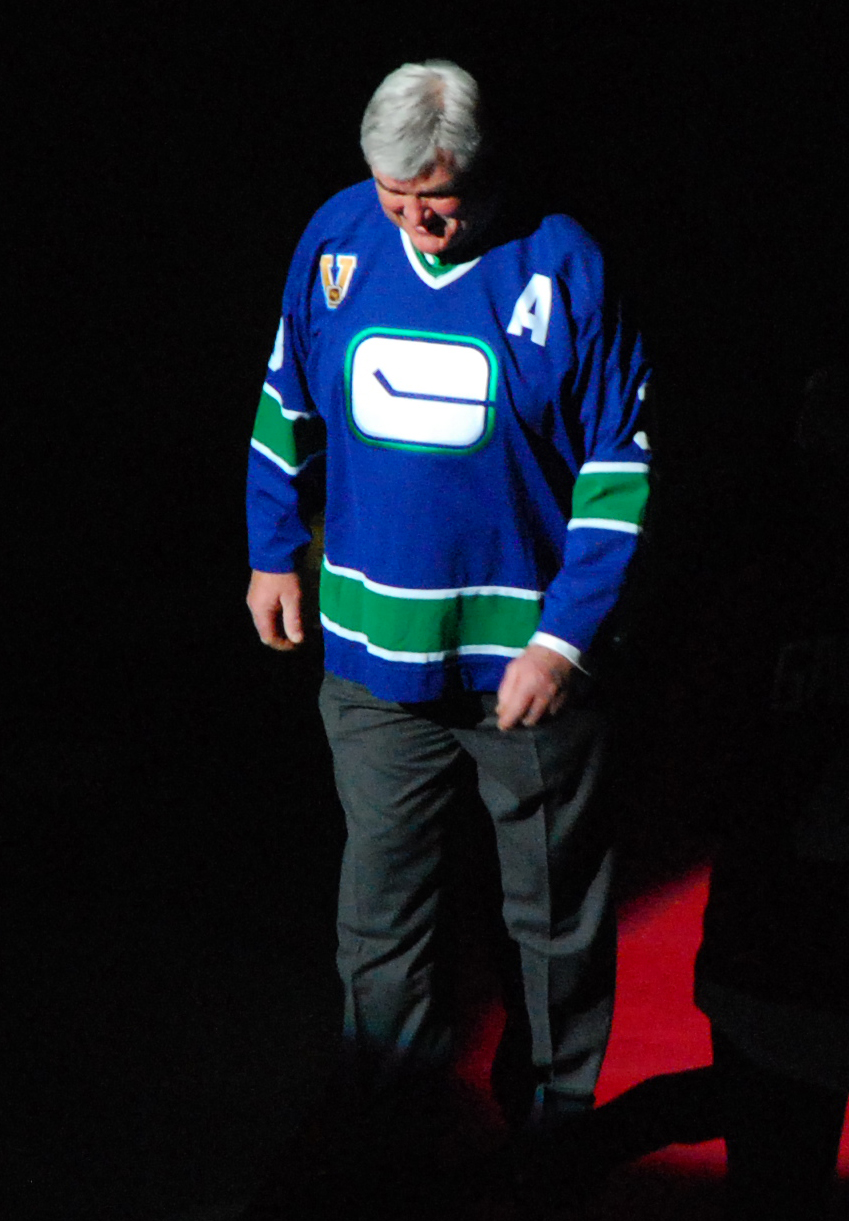
Pat Quinn was the head coach of the Canucks for five seasons.

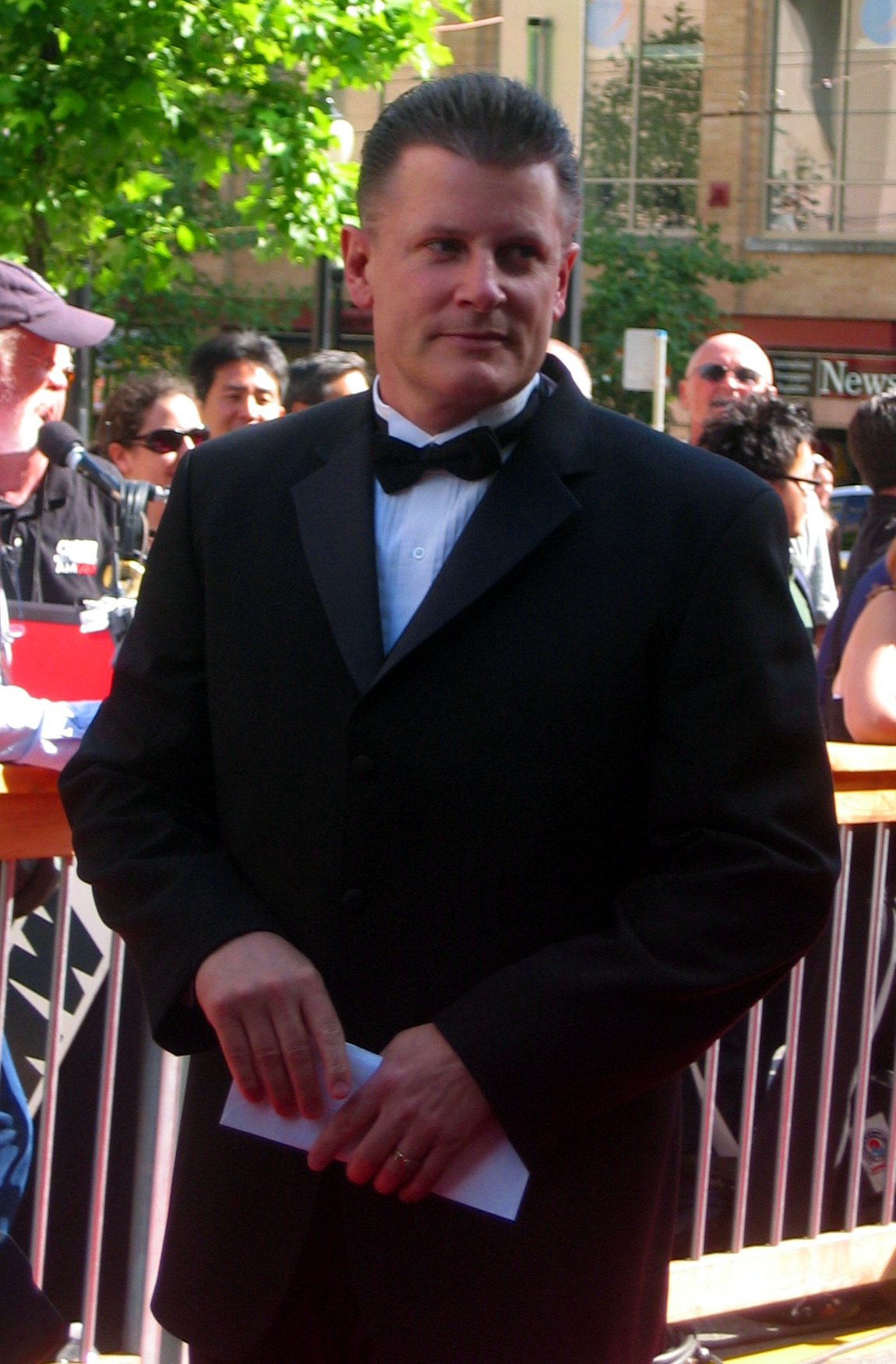
Marc Crawford was the head coach of the Canucks from 1999 to 2006.

Note: Statistics are correct through the 2025–26 season.

#	Name	Term	Regular season						Playoffs			Awards	Reference
#	Name	Term	GC	W	L	T	OTL	PTS	GC	W	L	Awards	Reference
1	Hal Laycoe	1970–1972	156	44	96	16	—	104	—	—	—		
2	Vic Stasiuk	1972–1973	78	22	47	9	—	53	—	—	—		
3	Bill McCreary	1973–1974	41	9	25	7	—	25	—	—	—		
4	Phil Maloney*	1974–1977	232	95	105	32	—	222	7	1	6		
5	Orland Kurtenbach*	1977–1978	125	36	62	27	—	99	—	—	—		
6	Harry Neale	1978–1982	315	106	144	65	—	177	10	2	8		
7	Roger Neilson	1982–1984	133	51	61	21	—	123	21	12	9		
—	Harry Neale	1984	32	15	13	4	—	34	4	1	3		
8	Bill LaForge*	1984	20	4	14	2	—	10	—	—	—		
—	Harry Neale	1984–1985	60	21	32	7	—	49	—	—	—		
9	Tom Watt	1985–1987	160	52	87	21	—	125	3	0	3		
10	Bob McCammon	1987–1991	294	102	156	36	—	240	7	3	4		
11	Pat Quinn	1991–1994	274	138	108	28	—	304	55	29	26	Jack Adams Award (1992)	
12	Rick Ley	1994–1996	124	47	50	27	—	121	11	4	7		
—	Pat Quinn	1996	6	3	3	0	—	6	6	2	4		
13	Tom Renney	1996–1997	101	39	53	9	—	87	—	—	—		
14	Mike Keenan	1997–1999	108	36	54	18	—	90	—	—	—		
15	Marc Crawford	1999–2006	529	246	189	62	32	586	31	12	19		
16	Alain Vigneault	2006–2013	540	313	170	—	57	683	68	33	35	Jack Adams Award (2007)	
17	John Tortorella (Note: Mike Sullivan acted as interim head coach of the Canucks for six games during their 2013–14 season, while Tortorella was serving a suspension.)	2013–2014	82	36	35	—	11	83	—	—	—		
18	Willie Desjardins	2014–2017	246	109	110	—	27	245	6	2	4		
19	Travis Green	2017–2021	314	133	147	—	34	300	17	10	7		
20	Bruce Boudreau	2021–2023	103	50	40	—	13	113	—	—	—		
21	Rick Tocchet	2023–2025	200	108	65	—	27	243	13	7	6	Jack Adams Award (2024)	
22	Adam Foote*	2025–2026	82	25	49	—	8	58	—	—	—		
23	Manny Malhotra*	2026–present	—	—	—	—	—	—	—	—	—		
