= Gord Fashoway =

Canadian ice hockey player (1926–2012)

- Born: June 16, 1926 Portage la Prairie, Manitoba, Canada
- Died: May 1, 2012 (aged 85) Portland, Oregon, U.S.
- Height: 5 ft 11 in (180 cm)
- Weight: 180 lb (82 kg; 12 st 12 lb)
- Position: Left wing
- Shot: Left
- Played for: Chicago Black Hawks
- Playing career: 1945–1964

Gordon Walter Fashoway (June 16, 1926 – May 1, 2012) was a Canadian professional ice hockey left winger and coach. He played 13 games in the National Hockey League with the Chicago Black Hawks during the 1950–51 season. The rest of his career, which lasted from 1945 to 1964, was mainly spent in the Western Hockey League. After his playing career Fashoway worked as a coach, and coached the Oakland Seals for 10 games in the 1967–68 season. He was born in Portage la Prairie, Manitoba.

== Playing career ==
Following the Black Hawks, Fashoway played for several teams in the Western Hockey League: the New Westminster Royals, Victoria Cougars, and Portland Buckaroos, where he ended his professional career in 1963.

== Coaching career ==
Upon the conclusion of his playing career, he entered coaching. He became an assistant coach with the expansion Oakland Seals for one year in 1968; after the resignation of Bert Olmstead, he served as head coach of this club for the final ten games of the Seals' inaugural year. He then returned to coach the Buckaroos from 1969 to 1973. Under his leadership, the Buckaroos captured their third WCHL championship in the 1970–71.

== Career statistics ==
=== Regular season and playoffs ===
			Regular season					Playoffs
Season	Team	League	GP	G	A	Pts	PIM	GP	G	A	Pts	PIM
1944–45	Winnipeg Monarchs	MJHL	8	4	3	7	4	8	8	2	10	16
1944–45	Winnipeg Army Grenades	WNDHL	—	—	—	—	—	2	0	0	0	0
1945–46	Winnipeg Monarchs	MJHL	8	10	4	14	12	7	6	1	7	0
1945–46	Winnipeg Monarchs	M-Cup	—	—	—	—	—	17	4	3	7	10
1946–47	Harringay Racers	ENL	36	63	22	85	44	—	—	—	—	—
1947–48	New Westminster Royals	PCHL	60	47	36	83	50	5	4	6	10	32
1948–49	Kansas City Pla-Mors	USHL	64	13	22	35	42	2	1	0	1	0
1949–50	Kansas City Pla-Mors	USHL	66	52	32	84	71	3	0	0	0	0
1950–51	Chicago Black Hawks	NHL	13	3	2	5	14	—	—	—	—	—
1950–51	New Westminster Royals	PCHL	32	12	13	25	26	11	4	2	6	4
1950–51	Milwaukee Sea Gulls	USHL	10	4	9	13	4	—	—	—	—	—
1951–52	New Westminster Royals	PCHL	70	51	34	85	46	7	5	0	5	2
1952–53	New Westminster Royals	WHL	68	35	28	63	31	7	3	2	5	0
1953–54	New Westminster Royals	WHL	70	43	26	69	35	7	2	3	5	4
1954–55	New Westminster Royals	WHL	70	45	32	77	20	—	—	—	—	—
1955–56	New Westminster Royals	WHL	69	47	32	79	16	4	0	1	1	0
1956–57	New Westminster Royals	WHL	70	41	25	66	36	11	6	5	11	6
1957–58	New Westminster Royals	WHL	69	33	33	66	43	4	1	0	1	0
1958–59	New Westminster Royals	WHL	67	37	24	61	16	—	—	—	—	—
1959–60	Vancouver Canucks	WHL	70	34	33	67	12	11	4	3	7	2
1960–61	Portland Buckaroos	WHL	66	42	32	74	8	14	6	10	16	2
1961–62	Portland Buckaroos	WHL	60	29	27	56	14	7	3	3	6	10
1962–63	Portland Buckaroos	WHL	61	36	20	56	8	7	3	0	3	0
1963–64	Portland Buckaroos	WHL	1	0	0	0	0	—	—	—	—	—
WHL totals			741	422	312	734	239	72	28	27	55	24
NHL totals			13	3	2	5	14	—	—	—	—	—

=== NHL coaching record ===
Team	Year	Regular season						Postseason
Team	Year	G	W	L	T	Pts	Finish	Result
Oakland Seals	1967–68	10	4	5	1	9	6th in West	Did not qualify

== Awards and achievements ==
- Turnbull Cup MJHL Championship (1946)
- Memorial Cup Championship (1946)
- USHL First All-Star Team (1950)
- PCHL First All-Star Team (1952)
- WHL Coast Division Second All-Star Team (1957, 1958, and 1961)
- WHL Championship (1961)
- WHL Championship as coach (1971)
- Honoured Member of the Manitoba Hockey Hall of Fame

Preceded by Bert Olmstead	Head coach of the Oakland Seals; 1968	Succeeded by Fred Glover
