= Archbishop MacDonald High School =

10-12 school in Edmonton, Alberta (est. 1967)

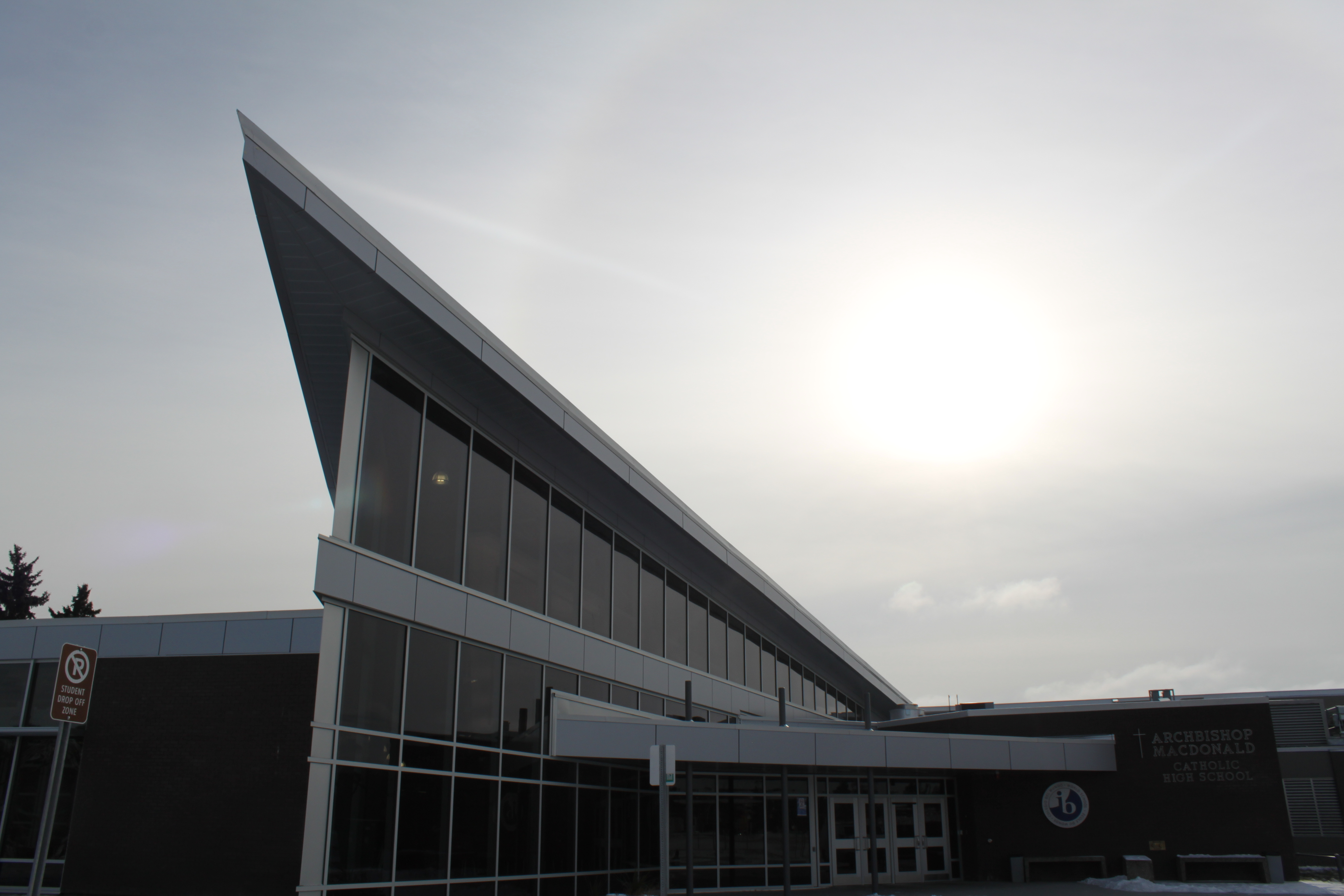

Location
- 10810-142 Street; Edmonton, Alberta, T5N 2P7; Canada; 53°33′10″N 113°34′01″W

Information
- School type: Senior High School
- Motto: "Comprendere et Conducere" (Comprehend and be of service)
- Religious affiliation: Roman Catholic
- Founded: 1967
- School board: Edmonton Catholic School District
- Superintendent: Lynnette Anderson (acting), Joe Naccarato (acting)
- Principal: Michelle Dupuis
- Grades: 10–12
- Enrollment: 1100+ (2023-2024)
- Language: English/French Immersion
- Area: Edmonton Catholic School District
- Colours: Purple and gold
- Mascot: Marauder (Scottish MacDuff)
- Team name: Marauders
- Website: www.archbishopmacdonald.ecsd.net

Archbishop MacDonald High School, established in 1967, is a Catholic senior high school located in Edmonton, Alberta, Canada. The school offers a range of academic programs, including the International Baccalaureate (IB) Diploma and French immersion.

== Academic Reputation and Admissions ==
Archbishop MacDonald High School is an academic Catholic high school in the Edmonton Catholic School District. The school is ranked as sixteenth in academic performance within Alberta.

Due to enrollment demand, Archbishop MacDonald High School requires students to meet certain academic criteria.

== Programs and extracurricular activities ==
Archbishop MacDonald High School offers a wide range of programs and extracurricular activities, including International Baccalaureate Program & Diploma Programs, Honour's Programs, French Immersion, French as a second language and Spanish language programs, after-school band programs, sports teams, a yearly play or musical, and various clubs.

== History ==
Archbishop MacDonald High School opened in 1967. The school is named after John Hugh MacDonald, who was appointed Archbishop of Edmonton, Alberta in 1938. Archbishop MacDonald High School has in the past, and continues to work alongside St. Joseph's Basilica and St. Joseph's Seminary of Edmonton.

== Notable alumni ==
- Keith Krause – political scientist; Rhodes Scholar
- Bill LaForge – hockey coach with Vancouver Canucks
- Theresa Lee – actress
- Jason Strudwick – professional hockey player with the Edmonton Oilers
- Tim Feehan – singer-songwriter, producer, mix master and Los Angeles area studio owners
- Belinda Metz –recording artist from the early to mid-1980s, Actor, choreographer and songwriter.
