= Tom Watt (ice hockey) =

- Born: June 17, 1935 (age 91) Toronto, Ontario, Canada
- Coached for: Toronto Varsity Blues; Winnipeg Jets; Vancouver Canucks; Toronto Maple Leafs; St. John's Maple Leafs; Sudbury Wolves
- Coaching career: 1970–2000

Tom Watt (born June 17, 1935) is a professional ice hockey scout for the Toronto Maple Leafs of the National Hockey League (NHL). Watt previously served as a coach in the NHL for 11 seasons, including seven as a head coach, and won the Jack Adams Award with the original Winnipeg Jets organization in 1981–82.

== Early career ==
In 1964 Watt became the head of men's phys-ed at Monarch Park Secondary School in Toronto.

In 1965, he began a highly-successful 15-season stint as head coach at the University of Toronto of the CIAU (Canadian Inter-University Athletic Union), where he had also played during his undergraduate studies. Under Watt's guidance, the University of Toronto's Varsity Blues men's ice hockey team hockey teams captured 11 conference titles and nine CIAU championships.

Returning in 1984–1985 between his NHL tenures in Winnipeg and Vancouver, he replaced NHL-bound Mike Keenan, and was later honoured by Ontario Universities Athletics in 1992.

== Professional coaching career ==
Watt broke into the NHL coaching ranks as an assistant coach with the Vancouver Canucks in 1980–81 season. His first NHL head coaching experience came with the Winnipeg Jets, whom he guided for two-plus seasons (1981 to 1984). In 1981–82, Watt helped the Jets to a 48-point improvement in the standings, and was named Coach of the Year, winning the Jack Adams Award for his efforts.

He held the positions of head coach and assistant general manager with the Canucks for two seasons beginning in 1985–86. Watt was then an assistant coach with the Calgary Flames from 1988 to 1990, and won the 1989 Stanley Cup. In 1990, he was hired as an assistant coach with the Toronto Maple Leafs, and took over as head coach just 12 games into the 1990–91 NHL season. After two seasons behind the Maple Leafs' bench, he served within the Toronto organization as director of professional development in 1992–93 and director of pro scouting in 1993–94. Watt then became the head coach for the Leafs' farm club, the St. John's Maple Leafs of the American Hockey League (AHL) for two seasons beginning in 1994–95.

Watt spent 1997–98 season as head coach of the Sudbury Wolves of the Ontario Hockey League (OHL), returning the Wolves to the playoffs after a three-year absence.

In 1999–2000, Watt returned to the NHL as a development coach for the Flames organization. Watt then joined the Mighty Ducks of Anaheim in January 2001 as special assignment scout. On July 24, 2001, he was named an assistant coach for the Mighty Ducks prior to reassignment the following year. Watt joined the Florida Panthers on August 16, 2005, as a pro scout. In September 2008, Watt returned to the Maple Leafs as a pro scout.

== International ==
Watt's international experience with Team Canada includes two Olympic games, two World Hockey Championships and three Canada Cup assistant coaching assignments.

== Honours ==
Watt was inducted as an honoured member into the Etobicoke Sports Hall of Fame on October 20, 2005.

Tom Watt was inducted as an honoured member into the Ontario Sports Hall of Fame on March 29, 2022.

In 1971, Watt also wrote a "best seller" book on "How to Play Hockey", and 52 years later, people still have an interest in this book, which sells on various websites.

== Coaching record ==
Team	Year	Regular season						Postseason
Team	Year	G	W	L	T	! Pts	Finish	Result
Winnipeg Jets	1981–82	80	33	33	14	80	2nd in Norris	Lost in division semi-finals (1-3)
Winnipeg Jets	1982–83	80	33	39	8	74	4th in Smythe	Lost in division semi-finals (0-3)
Winnipeg Jets	1983–84	21	6	13	2	14	4th in Smythe	Fired
Vancouver Canucks	1985–86	80	23	44	13	59	4th in Smythe	Lost in division semi-finals (0-3)
Vancouver Canucks	1986–87	80	29	43	8	66	5th in Smythe	Did not qualify
Toronto Maple Leafs	1990–91	69	22	37	10	54	5th in Norris	Did not qualify
Toronto Maple Leafs	1991–92	80	30	43	7	67	5th in Norris	Did not qualify
Winnipeg Jets Total		181	72	85	24	168		1-6 (0.143)
Vancouver Canucks Total		160	52	87	21	125		0-3 (0.000)
Toronto Maple Leafs Total		149	57	80	17	131		0-0 (0.000)
NHL Total		490	181	252	62	424		1-9 (0.100)

Awards and achievements
Preceded by Red Berenson	Winner of the Jack Adams Award; 1982	Succeeded by Orval Tessier
Sporting positions
Preceded by Mike Smith	Head coach of the Winnipeg Jets; 1981–83	Succeeded by Barry Long
Preceded by Harry Neale	Head coach of the Vancouver Canucks; 1985–87	Succeeded by Bob McCammon
Preceded by Doug Carpenter	Head coach of the Toronto Maple Leafs; 1990–92	Succeeded by Pat Burns
