= Harry Neale =

Canadian ice hockey player, coach, and TV commentator

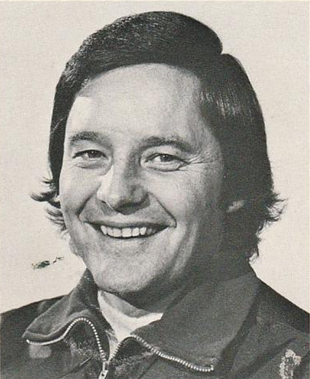
- Neale in 1974
- Born: March 9, 1937 (age 89) Sarnia, Ontario, Canada
- Coached for: Ohio State University; Minnesota Fighting Saints; New England Whalers; Vancouver Canucks; Detroit Red Wings
- Coaching career: 1966–1986

Harold Watson Neale (born March 9, 1937) is a Canadian retired NCAA, NHL and WHA coach and general manager, and ice hockey broadcaster.

== Coaching career ==
Neale played as a defenseman for the Toronto Marlboros from 1954 to 1957, winning the Memorial Cup in 1956. He then played with the University of Toronto Varsity Blues.

Following his playing career, Neale had his head coaching start at Hill Park Secondary School in Hamilton, Ontario, where he also taught social studies and physical education.

In 1966, he replaced Glen Sonmor at Ohio State University. While at Ohio State, he was a physical fitness trainer for the Ohio State football team. He coached the hockey Buckeyes for four seasons, compiling a 49-48-3 record. He left Ohio State in 1970 to coach junior hockey in Hamilton.

Neale was hired as assistant coach of the Minnesota Fighting Saints of the WHA in 1972. He replaced Sonmor again as head coach late in the 1972–73 season. He remained head coach until the Fighting Saints franchise folded during the 1975–76 season. Following Minnesota, Neale remained in the WHA as head coach of the New England Whalers for two seasons from 1976 to 1978. He coached the Whalers to the Avco Cup Finals where they lost to the Winnipeg Jets. Between stints at Minnesota and New England, Neale was an assistant coach for the U.S. team in the 1976 Canada Cup.

Hired by the Vancouver Canucks in 1978, Neale coached the Canucks for almost four seasons. Late in the 1981–82 season, Neale was involved in an altercation with fans during a game in Quebec City against the Nordiques and was suspended for ten games. Assistant coach Roger Neilson was promoted to interim coach during the suspension. When the Canucks went unbeaten in the next 10 games, he was given the job full-time as the team advanced to the 1982 Stanley Cup Finals. At season's end, Neale was promoted to general manager (an arrangement made prior to the suspension).

Neale returned to the Canucks bench in January 1984 after firing Neilson, and again in November 1984 after firing Bill LaForge twenty games into the season. The Canucks fired Neale from his posts as vice president, general manager, and head coach in April 1985.

The Detroit Red Wings hired Neale prior to the 1985–86 season. However, after a poor start, Neale was fired after 35 games.

Over his career, Neale coached several Hockey Hall of Fame players, including Gordie Howe, Mark Howe, Dave Keon, and Steve Yzerman.

== Broadcast career ==
During his coaching and managerial career, he sometimes worked for Hockey Night in Canada as a guest analyst in the playoffs when his team missed the playoffs or was eliminated from Stanley Cup contention. He then began working as a broadcaster full-time in 1986, where he was teamed with play-by-play man Bob Cole on CBC. Together, the pair broadcast 20 Stanley Cup Finals, the 1998, 2002, 2006 Winter Olympics, the 1996 World Cup of Hockey, and 2004 World Cup of Hockey for CBC. In the playoffs, when Cole was working with other colour commentators, he also worked with Don Wittman, Chris Cuthbert, and Jim Hughson. During this time, he also provided colour commentary for locally televised Toronto Maple Leafs games, pairing up with play-by-play broadcasters Jim Hughson, Ken Daniels, Jiggs McDonald, and Joe Bowen. In addition, Neale occasionally worked on Edmonton Oilers and Calgary Flames broadcasts. He left the Toronto telecasts after the 2006–07 season to join the Buffalo Sabres broadcast team in 2007.

He is known for the same sense of humour he was famous for as a coach, often referring to the puck as "...bouncing like an Indian rubber (lacrosse) ball", as well as for his estimations of exact distances on the ice. In 2001, he told Ottawa fans they could "take a big bite of my ass" if they did not like him on Hockey Night.

At the gold medal game of the 2002 Winter Olympics in Salt Lake City between Canada and the United States, after Joe Sakic scored Canada's fifth goal with 1:20 remaining, he replied to his partner, Bob Cole's call as, "That's more than enough. Take a look at the Canadian bench if you doubt me when I say, that's more than enough."

Neale spent five seasons, from 2007–08 to 2011–12, as the colour commentator for the Buffalo Sabres serving alongside Rick Jeanneret, a personal friend of Neale's and fellow Foster Hewitt Memorial Award winner. He spent the 2012–13 season as a studio analyst for the Sabres' pregame show and intermission reports.

During the 2013–14 season, Neale served as a colour commentator for Toronto Maple Leafs broadcasts on Leafs TV, retiring at the end of the 2013–14 season.

On March 25, 2022, Neale served as a colour commentator for the Buffalo Sabres, once again alongside Rick Jeanneret in a guest appearance, for a game involving the Buffalo Sabres and Washington Capitals during the first and second periods.

== Head coaching record ==
=== University ===
Neale was head coach for four seasons at Ohio State University.

Record table
Season	Team	Overall	Conference	Standing	Postseason
Ohio State Buckeyes Independent (1966–1970)
1966–67	Ohio State	10–10–0			
1967–68	Ohio State	9–13–2			
1968–69	Ohio State	11–18–0			
1969–70	Ohio State	19–7–1			
Total:		49–48–3			
National champion Postseason invitational champion Conference regular season champion Conference regular season and conference tournament champion Division regular season champion Division regular season and conference tournament champion Conference tournament champion

=== Professional record ===
Team	Year	Regular season						Playoffs			
Team	Year	G	W	L	T	Pts	Finish	W	L	Win%	Result
MFS	1972–73	19	10	9	0	(73)	4th in West	1	4	.167	Lost in Division Semifinals (WPG)
MFS	1973–74	76	42	32	2	86	2nd in West	6	5	.545	Lost in Division Finals (HOU)
MFS	1974–75	77	42	32	3	87	3rd in West	6	6	.500	Lost in Semifinals (QUE)
MFS	1975–76	59	30	25	4	64	4th in West	–	–	–	(team folded)
NEW	1975–76	12	5	6	1	(73)	3rd in East	10	7	.588	Lost in Division Semifinals (HOU)
NEW	1976–77	81	35	40	6	76	4th in East	1	4	.200	Lost in Division Semifinals (QUE)
NEW	1977–78	80	44	31	5	93	2nd in WHA	8	6	.571	Lost in Avco Cup Finals (WPG)
VAN	1978–79	80	25	42	13	63	2nd in Smythe	1	2	.333	Lost in Preliminary Round (PHI)
VAN	1979–80	80	27	37	16	70	3rd in Smythe	1	3	.250	Lost in Preliminary Round (BUF)
VAN	1980–81	80	28	32	20	76	3rd in Smythe	0	3	.000	Lost in Preliminary Round (BUF)
VAN	1981–82	75	26	33	16	(77)	2nd in Smythe	–	–	–	(suspended)
VAN	1983–84	32	15	13	4	(73)	3rd in Smythe	1	3	.250	Lost in Division Semifinals (CGY)
VAN	1984–85	60	21	32	7	(59)	5th in Smythe	–	–	–	Missed playoffs
DET	1985–86	35	8	23	4	(40)	5th in Norris	–	–	–	(fired)
WHA Total		404	208	175	21	437		32	32	.500	6 playoff appearances
NHL Total		442	150	212	80	380		3	11	.214	4 playoff appearances
Pro Total		846	358	387	101	817		35	43	.448	10 playoff appearances

== Honours ==
In 2010, he was elected as an inaugural inductee into the World Hockey Association Hall of Fame in the coaching category.

In 2013, Neale received the Foster Hewitt Memorial Award as an honor of the Hockey Hall of Fame.

== Personal life ==
Neale grew up in Sarnia, Ontario and moved to East Amherst, New York in 1987. He married a surgical nurse who worked at a Buffalo hospital, and has five children.

During his years of TV commentating with Hockey Night in Canada, he commuted from Buffalo to the Toronto TV studios on the day of the game, until dense traffic on the Queen Elizabeth Way forced a change to stay in a hotel the night before the broadcast.

Preceded by Don Blackburn	Head coach of the New England Whalers; 1976–78	Succeeded by Bill Dineen
Preceded by Orland Kurtenbach; Roger Neilson; Bill LaForge	Head coach of the Vancouver Canucks; 1978–1982; 1983–84; 1984–85	Succeeded by Roger Neilson; Bill LaForge; Tom Watt
Preceded by Jake Milford	General Manager of the Vancouver Canucks; 1982–1985	Succeeded by Jack Gordon
Preceded by Nick Polano	Head coach of the Detroit Red Wings; 1985	Succeeded by Brad Park
Preceded by Brad Selwood	Toronto Maple Leafs color commentator 1986–2007	Succeeded by Greg Millen
Preceded by Mickey Redmond and John Davidson	Canadian network television color commentator 1987–2007	Succeeded by Greg Millen
Preceded by Jim Lorentz	Buffalo Sabres color commentator 2007–2012	Succeeded by Rob Ray
