= Bill McCreary Sr. =

Canadian ice hockey player, coach, and general manager (1934–2019)

- Born: December 2, 1934 Sundridge, Ontario, Canada
- Died: November 25, 2019 (aged 84) Brighton, Michigan, U.S.
- Height: 5 ft 10 in (178 cm)
- Weight: 172 lb (78 kg; 12 st 4 lb)
- Position: Left wing
- Shot: Left
- Played for: New York Rangers; Detroit Red Wings; Montreal Canadiens; St. Louis Blues
- Playing career: 1953–1971

William Edward McCreary Sr. (December 2, 1934 – November 25, 2019) was an ice hockey left winger, coach and general manager. He played in the National Hockey League with the New York Rangers, Detroit Red Wings, Montreal Canadiens and the St. Louis Blues from between 1953 and 1971, and then coached in the league with the Blues, Vancouver Canucks, and California Golden Seals between 1971 and 1975. After stepping down as coach of the Golden Seals he served as their general manager from 1975 to 1977, including their first year as the Cleveland Barons.

== Early life ==
McCreary was born in Sundridge, Ontario.

== Career ==
During his pro career, McCreary played for the New York Rangers, Detroit Red Wings, Montreal Canadiens and the St. Louis Blues. He later coached the Vancouver Canucks for the first half of the 1973–74 season and then became general manager of the California Golden Seals in August 1974. Although the Seals were performing fairly well, McCreary did not like the coaching methods of Marshall Johnston, and fired Johnston on January 22, 1975, taking over the position himself. He hired Jack Evans, who had coached their minor league affiliate the Salt Lake Golden Eagles, as coach the following year, while remaining as general manager. The team moved to Cleveland in 1976 and became the Cleveland Barons. Yet, the club struggled and McCreary was fired as general manager in January 1977, and was replaced by Harry Howell, who had been serving as the assistant general manager.

He was the elder brother of Keith McCreary, also an NHL left winger. His son Bill McCreary Jr. played 12 games in the NHL with the Toronto Maple Leafs during the 1980–81 season. He is also the brother-in-law of Ron Attwell.

McCreary died on November 25, 2019.

== Awards and achievements ==
- WHL Prairie Division Second All-Star Team (1957)
- CPHL First All-Star Team (1964, 1966)

== Career statistics ==
=== Regular season and playoffs ===
			Regular season					Playoffs
Season	Team	League	GP	G	A	Pts	PIM	GP	G	A	Pts	PIM
1951–52	Guelph Biltmores	OHA	52	30	28	58	12	11	4	4	8	6
1951–52	Guelph Biltmores	M-Cup	—	—	—	—	—	12	5	10	15	4
1952–53	Guelph Biltmores	OHA	50	32	25	57	31	—	—	—	—	—
1952–53	Guelph Biltmores	M-Cup	—	—	—	—	—	7	2	3	5	2
1953–54	Guelph Biltmores	OHA	59	35	49	84	57	3	0	3	3	4
1953–54	New York Rangers	NHL	2	0	0	0	2	—	—	—	—	—
1954–55	Guelph Biltmores	OHA	48	46	37	83	38	6	4	3	7	2
1954–55	New York Rangers	NHL	8	0	2	2	0	—	—	—	—	—
1955–56	Providence Reds	AHL	37	8	13	21	18	—	—	—	—	—
1955–56	Saskatoon Quakers	WHL	25	12	20	32	45	3	0	0	0	0
1956–57	Edmonton Flyers	WHL	69	33	26	59	37	8	2	7	9	4
1957–58	Detroit Red Wings	NHL	3	1	0	1	0	—	—	—	—	—
1957–58	Edmonton Flyers	WHL	21	7	7	14	10	5	2	1	3	2
1957–58	Hershey Bears	AHL	31	4	9	13	6	—	—	—	—	—
1958–59	Springfield Indians	AHL	65	14	34	48	22	—	—	—	—	—
1959–60	Springfield Indians	AHL	69	19	31	50	16	10	6	4	10	6
1960–61	Springfield Indians	AHL	72	33	54	87	26	8	5	4	9	6
1961–62	Springfield Indians	AHL	69	27	49	76	49	2	0	2	2	0
1962–63	Montreal Canadiens	NHL	14	2	3	5	0	—	—	—	—	—
1962–63	Hull-Ottawa Canadiens	EPHL	46	15	32	47	22	—	—	—	—	—
1963–64	Omaha Knights	CHL	72	24	51	75	56	3	1	0	1	2
1964–65	Omaha Knights	CHL	70	24	44	68	48	6	0	3	3	0
1965–66	Houston Apollos	CHL	70	26	26	52	44	—	—	—	—	—
1966–67	Houston Apollos	CHL	56	22	34	56	34	6	1	2	3	0
1967–68	St. Louis Blues	NHL	70	13	13	26	22	15	3	2	5	0
1968–69	St. Louis Blues	NHL	71	13	17	30	50	12	1	5	6	14
1969–70	St. Louis Blues	NHL	73	15	17	32	16	15	1	7	8	0
1970–71	St. Louis Blues	NHL	68	9	10	19	16	6	1	2	3	0
NHL totals			309	53	62	115	106	48	6	16	22	14

== Coaching record ==
Team	Year	Regular season						Postseason
Team	Year	G	W	L	T	Pts	Finish	Result
St. Louis Blues	1971–72	24	6	14	4	16	3rd in West	—
Vancouver Canucks	1973–74	41	9	25	7	25	7th in East	Fired
California Golden Seals	1974–75	32	8	20	4	20	4th in Adams	Missed playoffs
NHL totals		97	23	59	15			

Preceded by Marshall Johnston	Head coach of the California Golden Seals; 1975	Succeeded by Jack Evans
Preceded by Sid Abel	Head coach of the St. Louis Blues; 1971	Succeeded by Al Arbour
Preceded by Vic Stasiuk	Head coach of the Vancouver Canucks; 1973–74	Succeeded by Phil Maloney
Preceded by Fred Glover	General Manager of the California Golden Seals / Cleveland Barons; 1975–77	Succeeded by Harry Howell
