= Patrick LaForge =

Former president and CEO of the Edmonton Oilers

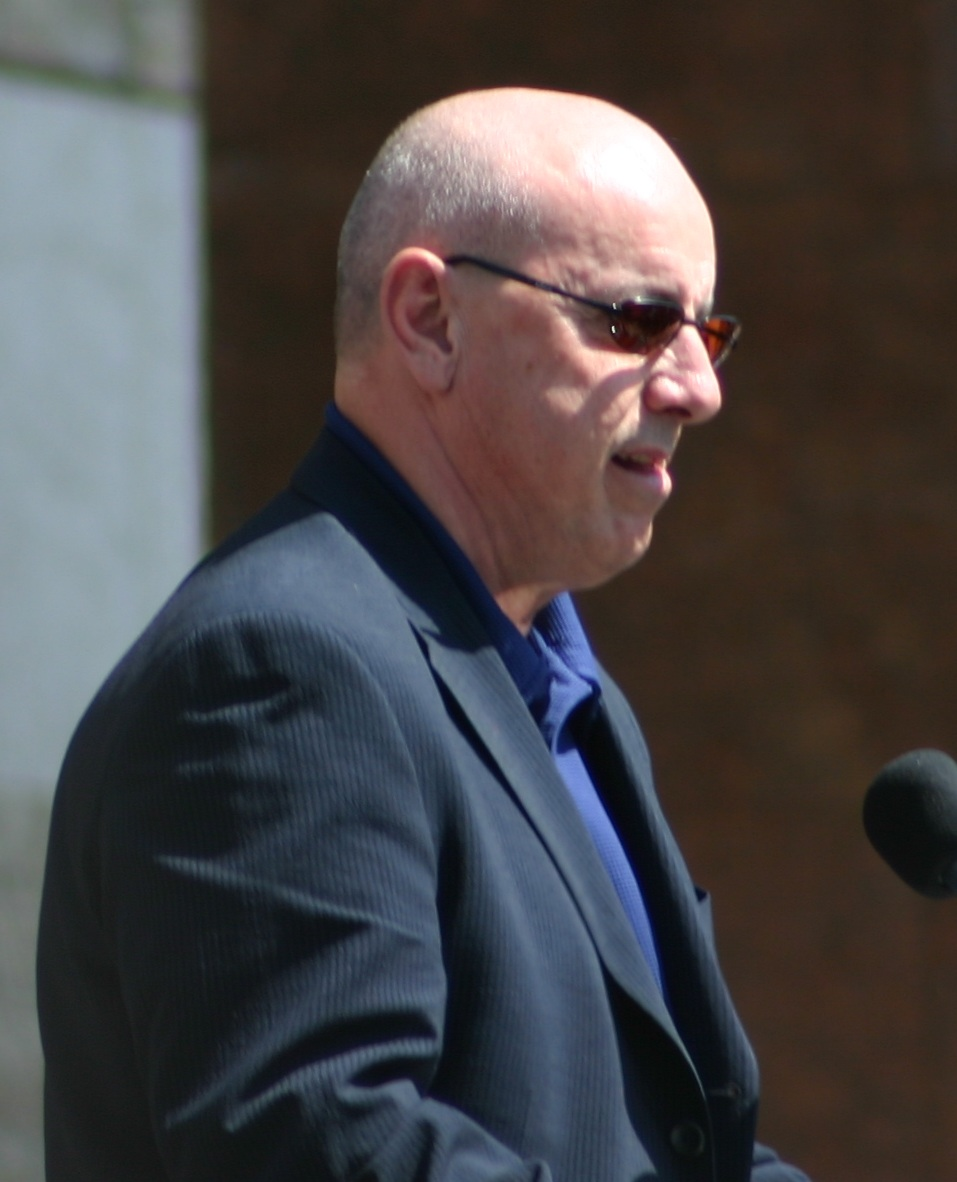
- Patrick LaForge at an Edmonton Oilers Community Appreciation event, 2006
- Born: November 19, 1952 (age 73); Lac La Biche, Alberta, Canada
- Occupations: Former President and CEO of the Edmonton Oilers

Patrick LaForge (born November 19, 1952) is the former president and CEO of the National Hockey League team the Edmonton Oilers. He was born in Lac La Biche and raised in Edmonton.

LaForge is the cousin of Bill LaForge, the former coach of the Vancouver Canucks. LaForge is a distant cousin of Pierre Boivin, former President of the Montreal Canadiens.

LaForge graduated from the Northern Alberta Institute of Technology and went on to receive his MBA from the University of Michigan. In July 2000, he was hired as president and CEO of the Edmonton Oilers organization. From his hiring, he worked actively to build pride of ownership for the organization while exploring ways to strengthen and stabilize the club commercially. On July 2, 2008, the Oilers were purchased by Edmonton billionaire Daryl Katz. With one of the smallest markets in the league, the Oilers have become one of the most financially successful clubs in the NHL and rated as a top 10 sports club in the world by Money Magazine.

One of LaForge’s most broadly known achievements was his role in producing the inaugural regular season NHL game played outdoors, called the Heritage Classic. The game highlighted the Edmonton Oilers and Montreal Canadiens playing in front of 57,167 Commonwealth Stadium in Edmonton in winter of 2003. The Heritage Classic paved the way for an annual outdoor hockey game in the NHL, attracting fans worldwide. LaForge also coordinated the development of Katz Group's Edmonton arena and district project, a development paid in part with public dollars.

LaForge had another major achievement with the return of the Edmonton Oil Kings of the Western Hockey League in 2007. The once legendary major junior team won two Memorial Cups before leaving town in 1976, but were reborn under Oilers ownership. LaForge served as both an alternate governor for the Oilers in the NHL, and governor of the Oil Kings in the Western Hockey League.

On April 24, 2015 LaForge stepped down as president & chief operating officer of Oilers Entertainment Group.

== Other activities ==
LaForge was a past president of the Edmonton Chamber of Commerce. He was named one of Alberta's 50 most influential people by Alberta Venture Magazine.
