= Marshall Johnston =

Canadian ice hockey player, coach, and executive

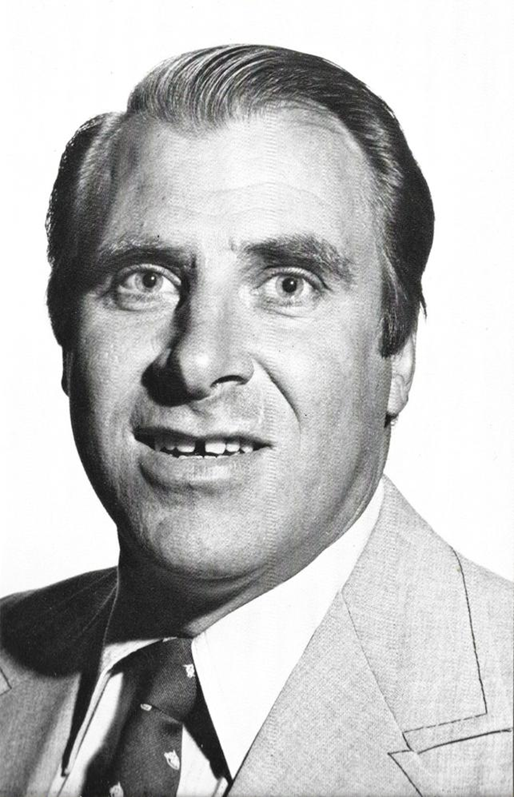
- Johnston in 1981
- Born: June 6, 1941 (age 85) Birch Hills, Saskatchewan, Canada
- Height: 5 ft 11 in (180 cm)
- Weight: 175 lb (79 kg; 12 st 7 lb)
- Position: Defence
- Shot: Right
- Played for: Minnesota North Stars; California Golden Seals
- National team: Canada
- Playing career: 1967–1974

Medal record

Men's Ice hockey

Representing Canada

Olympic Games
Bronze medal – third place	1968 Grenoble	

World Championships
Bronze medal – third place	1966 Yugoslavia	
Bronze medal – third place	1967 Austria	

Lawrence Marshall Johnston (born June 6, 1941) is a Canadian former professional ice hockey player, coach and executive. He played as a defenceman for the Minnesota North Stars and California Golden Seals of the National Hockey League (NHL). He has also coached in the NHL for the California Golden Seals, Colorado Rockies, and served as general manager of the Ottawa Senators. He was inducted into the International Ice Hockey Federation Hall of Fame in 1998.

== Career ==
Johnston was an All-American player at the University of Denver before his NHL career and later coached the Pioneers from 1977 to 1981. He also represented Canada at the 1964 and 1968 Olympic Games, serving as team captain in 1968.

Canada, Czechoslovakia, and Sweden finished with identical records of five wins and two losses at the 1964 Winter Olympics. Canada thought they had won the bronze medal based on the goal differential in the three games among the tied countries. When they attended the presentation of the Olympic medals, they were disappointed to learn they had finished in fourth place based on the goal differential of all seven games played. The players and Canadian Amateur Hockey Association executives accused that International Ice Hockey Federation president Bunny Ahearne, made a last-minute decision to change the rules and take away a medal from Canada. Later that night, the players gathered in Father David Bauer's room where Johnston summarized the team's feeling that, "The shepherd and his flock have been fleeced".

Johnston broke into the NHL as a player during the expansion season of 1967–68. He would play parts of four seasons with the North Stars before moving to the California Golden Seals in 1971–72.

Upon retiring as a player, Johnston served as head coach the Golden Seals from 1973 to 1975 before moving to the NCAA, where he spent six seasons on the coaching staff of the University of Denver, including head coach from 1977 to 1981.

Johnston returned to the NHL in 1981, joining the Colorado Rockies as assistant general manager and assistant coach, soon being promoted to head coach. When the franchise relocated to New Jersey to become the Devils, Johnston remained with the club and was later named Director of Player Personnel, a position he held for ten years.

Johnston then joined the Ottawa Senators organization in 1996 as Director of Player Personnel. In 1999 he was named the club's general manager, replacing the departing Rick Dudley. After three successful seasons at the helm of the Senators, Johnston announced his retirement so he could spend more time with his wife and family.

== Career statistics ==
=== Regular season and playoffs ===
			Regular season					Playoffs
Season	Team	League	GP	G	A	Pts	PIM	GP	G	A	Pts	PIM
1957–58	Prince Albert Mintos	SJHL	49	20	29	49	21	5	0	0	0	2
1958–59	Prince Albert Mintos	SJHL	48	31	24	55	17	5	1	0	1	4
1959–60	University of Denver	WCHA	—	—	—	—	—	—	—	—	—	—
1960–61	University of Denver	WCHA	32	11	19	30	4	—	—	—	—	—
1961–62	University of Denver	WCHA	—	—	—	—	—	—	—	—	—	—
1962–63	University of Denver	WCHA	—	—	—	—	—	—	—	—	—	—
1963–64	Canadian National Team	Intl	—	—	—	—	—	—	—	—	—	—
1964–65	Winnipeg Monarchs	SSHL	2	1	2	3	0	—	—	—	—	—
1965–66	Canadian National Team	Intl	—	—	—	—	—	—	—	—	—	—
1966–67	Canadian National Team	Intl	—	—	—	—	—	—	—	—	—	—
1967–68	Winnipeg Nationals	WCSHL	—	5	13	18	10	—	—	—	—	—
1967–68	Minnesota North Stars	NHL	7	0	0	0	0	—	—	—	—	—
1968–69	Cleveland Barons	AHL	53	6	20	26	31	5	0	4	4	4
1968–69	Minnesota North Stars	NHL	13	0	0	0	2	—	—	—	—	—
1969–70	Iowa Stars	CHL	50	1	25	26	42	—	—	—	—	—
1969–70	Minnesota North Stars	NHL	28	0	5	5	14	6	0	0	0	2
1970–71	Cleveland Barons	AHL	69	11	45	56	45	8	0	6	6	4
1970–71	Minnesota North Stars	NHL	1	0	0	0	0	—	—	—	—	—
1971–72	California Golden Seals	NHL	74	2	11	13	4	—	—	—	—	—
1972–73	California Golden Seals	NHL	78	10	20	30	14	—	—	—	—	—
1973–74	California Golden Seals	NHL	50	2	16	18	24	—	—	—	—	—
NHL totals			250	14	52	66	58	6	0	0	0	2

=== International ===
Year	Team	Event	GP	G	A	Pts	PIM
1964	Canada	OLY	7	0	3	3	6
1966	Canada	WC	7	3	3	6	4
1967	Canada	WC	7	2	2	4	0
1968	Canada	OLY	7	2	6	8	4
Senior totals			28	7	14	21	14

== Head coaching record ==
=== NHL ===
Team	Year	Regular season						Postseason
Team	Year	G	W	L	T	Pts	Finish	Result
California Golden Seals	1973–74	21	2	17	2	(36)	8th in West	Missed playoffs
California Golden Seals	1974–75	48	11	28	9	(51)	4th in Adams	(fired)
Colorado Rockies	1981–82	56	15	32	9	(49)	5th in Smythe	Missed playoffs
Total		125	28	77	20			

=== College ===
Record table
Season	Team	Overall	Conference	Standing	Postseason
Denver Pioneers (WCHA) (1977–1981)
1977–78	Denver	33-6-1	27-5-0	1st	WCHA Second Round
1978–79	Denver	20-20-3	14-16-2	6th	WCHA First Round
1979–80	Denver	13-22-1	8-17-1	10th	
1980–81	Denver	23-15-2	15-11-2	4th	WCHA First Round
Denver:		89-63-7	64-49-5		
Total:		89-63-7			
National champion Postseason invitational champion Conference regular season champion Conference regular season and conference tournament champion Division regular season champion Division regular season and conference tournament champion Conference tournament champion

== Awards and achievements ==
- 1971: Eddie Shore Award
- 1998 inductee into the International Ice Hockey Federation Hall of Fame
- 1995 Stanley Cup champion (New Jersey Devils)

Sporting positions
Preceded by Fred Glover	Head coach of the California Golden Seals; 1974–1975	Succeeded by Bill McCreary Sr.
Preceded by Bert Marshall	Head coach of the Colorado Rockies; 1981–1982	Succeeded by Bill MacMillan
Preceded by Rick Dudley	General manager of the Ottawa Senators; 1999–2002	Succeeded by John Muckler
Awards and achievements
Preceded by Bob Johnson	WCHA Coach of the Year; 1977–1978	Succeeded by John Gasparini
