= Fred Glover (ice hockey) =

Canadian ice hockey player (1928–2001)

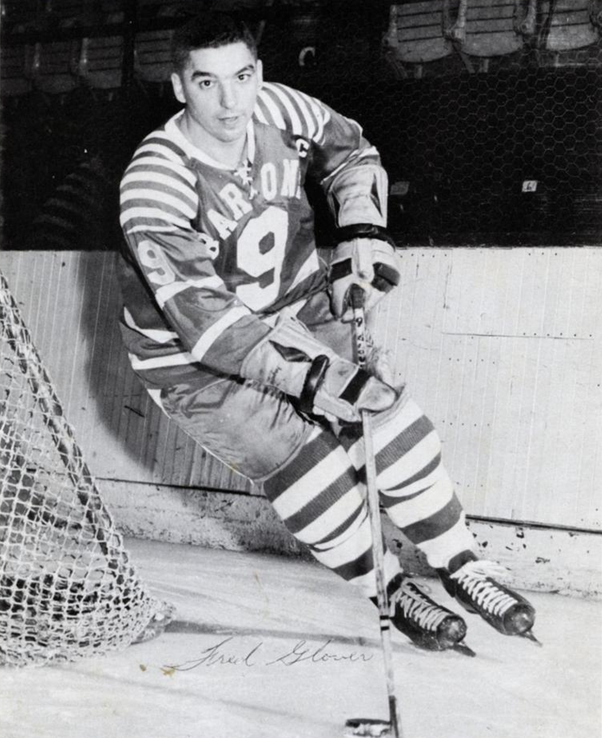
- Born: January 5, 1928 Toronto, Ontario, Canada
- Died: August 16, 2001 (aged 73) Hayward, California, US
- Height: 5 ft 9 in (175 cm)
- Weight: 160 lb (73 kg; 11 st 6 lb)
- Position: Centre
- Shot: Right
- Played for: Chicago Black Hawks; Detroit Red Wings
- Playing career: 1946–1968

Frederick Austin Glover (January 5, 1928 – August 16, 2001) was a Canadian professional ice hockey player and coach. He played 92 games in the National Hockey League (NHL) with the Detroit Red Wings and Chicago Black Hawks between 1949 and 1952, though most of his career, which lasted from 1947 to 1968, was with the Cleveland Barons of the American Hockey League (AHL). After his playing career he coached the Barons for several years, and coached in the NHL with the Oakland Seals/California Golden Seals and Los Angeles Kings between 1968 and 1974, also serving as general manager of the Golden Seals on two occasions during that time. He was the brother of Howie Glover, who also played in the NHL.

== Playing career ==
Glover played junior hockey in his native Toronto. At age 21, he signed his first professional hockey contract and debuted with the American Hockey League's Indianapolis Capitals, leading his team in scoring as a rookie. In 1950, he won the first of his record five Calder Cup championships, and he received his first NHL promotion during the same year. He scored a career high 48 goals in 1951. Glover played 54 games with the Detroit Red Wings in 1951–52, but he was not active during the playoffs as the Wings won the Stanley Cup. Glover was traded to the Cleveland Barons in 1953, and he became the most celebrated player in team history. In fifteen seasons with Cleveland, he won four Calder Cups and three league MVP awards. He scored a career high 107 points in 1960. He retired in 1968 as the AHL's career leader in games played (1,201), goals (520), assists (814), points (1,334) and penalty minutes (2,402).

== Coaching career ==
Between 1962 and 1968, Glover served a dual role as both star player and head coach. He won his 1964 championship while working in this capacity. He took a job as an NHL coach in 1968 as he joined the Oakland Seals. As a rookie coach, he was honored by The Sporting News as coach of the year, as he led his second year expansion franchise to a 22-point improvement over their initial season. However the team's performance diminished in each of the next two seasons, and he was fired three games into the 1971–72 campaign. Just weeks later, he became the first coach to manage two teams in one season, as he joined the Los Angeles Kings and finished out their season after the franchise had fired coach Larry Regan. He returned to the Seals in 1972 as a mid-season replacement, coaching the team to a last place finish, before being fired during the next season.

== Awards and honors ==
- 1952 Stanley Cup Championship (Detroit Red Wings)
- Five-time 1954 Calder Cup winner (Indianapolis Capitals - 1950, Cleveland Barons - 1953, 1954, 1957, 1964)
- Two-time John B. Sollenberger Trophy winner - 1957, 1960.
- Three-time Les Cunningham Award winner - 1960, 1962, 1964
- Number (9) retired by the Cleveland Monsters for his career with the Barons
- AHL Hall of Fame inductee (class of 2006)
- Greater Cleveland Sports Hall of Fame, 2008 inductee (along with his brother Howie)

== Career statistics ==
=== Regular season and playoffs ===
			Regular season					Playoffs
Season	Team	League	GP	G	A	Pts	PIM	GP	G	A	Pts	PIM
1945–46	Galt Red Wings	OHA	20	20	9	29	16	5	1	2	3	4
1946–47	Galt Red Wings	OHA	32	34	26	60	67	9	6	2	8	21
1947–48	Omaha Knights	USHL	66	16	39	55	79	3	0	0	0	0
1948–49	Indianapolis Capitals	AHL	68	35	48	83	59	2	0	0	0	2
1948–49	Detroit Red Wings	NHL	—	—	—	—	—	2	0	0	0	0
1949–50	Detroit Red Wings	NHL	7	0	0	0	0	—	—	—	—	—
1949–50	Indianapolis Capitals	AHL	55	22	29	51	65	8	5	4	9	8
1950–51	Indianapolis Capitals	AHL	69	48	36	84	106	3	0	1	1	8
1950–51	Detroit Red Wings	NHL	—	—	—	—	—	6	0	0	0	0
1951–52	Detroit Red Wings	NHL	54	9	9	18	25	—	—	—	—	—
1951–52	Indianapolis Capitals	AHL	10	5	6	11	8	—	—	—	—	—
1952–53	Chicago Black Hawks	NHL	31	4	2	6	37	—	—	—	—	—
1952–53	St. Louis Flyers	AHL	7	3	3	6	8	—	—	—	—	—
1952–53	Cleveland Barons	AHL	29	9	16	25	74	11	2	2	4	36
1953–54	Cleveland Barons	AHL	55	23	42	65	117	9	8	6	14	15
1954–55	Cleveland Barons	AHL	58	33	42	75	108	4	4	1	5	8
1955–56	Cleveland Barons	AHL	64	31	48	79	187	8	2	9	11	2
1956–57	Cleveland Barons	AHL	64	42	57	99	111	12	6	8	14	34
1957–58	Cleveland Barons	AHL	64	28	48	76	147	7	4	2	6	26
1958–59	Cleveland Barons	AHL	66	22	39	61	136	7	3	2	5	31
1959–60	Cleveland Barons	AHL	72	38	69	107	143	7	4	3	7	30
1960–61	Cleveland Barons	AHL	61	23	46	69	138	4	1	2	3	9
1961–62	Cleveland Barons	AHL	70	40	45	85	148	6	2	4	6	14
1962–63	Cleveland Barons	AHL	71	26	54	80	171	6	3	4	7	12
1963–64	Cleveland Barons	AHL	69	26	50	76	155	9	3	4	7	21
1964–65	Cleveland Barons	AHL	72	20	41	61	208	—	—	—	—	—
1965–66	Cleveland Barons	AHL	47	8	28	36	74	12	0	3	3	41
1966–67	Cleveland Barons	AHL	60	25	35	60	107	5	1	1	2	10
1967–68	Cleveland Barons	AHL	70	13	32	45	132	—	—	—	—	—
AHL totals			1201	520	814	1334	2402	120	48	56	104	307
NHL totals			92	13	11	24	62	8	0	0	0	0

== NHL coaching record ==
Team	Year	Regular season						Postseason
Team	Year	G	W	L	T	Pts	Finish	Result
Oakland Seals	1968–69	76	29	36	11	69	2nd in West	Lost in quarter-finals
Oakland Seals	1969–70	76	22	40	14	58	4th in West	Lost in quarter-finals
California Golden Seals	1970–71	78	20	53	5	45	7th in West	Missed playoffs
California Golden Seals	1971–72	3	0	1	2	2	Fired	—
Los Angeles Kings	1971–72	68	18	42	8	44	7th in West	Missed playoffs
California Golden Seals	1972–73	66	14	39	13	41	8th in West	Missed playoffs
California Golden Seals	1973–74	57	11	38	8	30	Fired	—
NHL totals		424	114	249	61	—	—	—

Preceded by Gord Fashoway; Garry Young	Head coach of the Oakland / California Golden Seals; 1968–71; 1972–74	Succeeded by Vic Stasiuk; Marshall Johnston
Preceded by Bill Torrey; Garry Young	General manager of the Oakland / California Golden Seals; 1970–71; 1972–74	Succeeded by Garry Young; Bill McCreary, Sr.
Preceded by Larry Regan	Head coach of the Los Angeles Kings; 1971–72	Succeeded by Bob Pulford
