= List of California Golden Seals head coaches =

This is a list of coaches of the California Seals, Oakland Seals and California Golden Seals. Eight men coached the Seals from their creation for the 1967–68 NHL season until the team moved to Cleveland, Ohio after the 1975–76 NHL season. Fred Glover had two stints as coach of the Seals. Bert Olmstead is the only Seals coach inducted in the Hockey Hall of Fame.

== Key ==
| # | Number of coaches |
| GC | Games coached |
| W | Wins |
| L | Loses |
| T | Ties |
| Win % | Win – Loss percentage |

== Coaches ==
| # | Name | Dates | Regular Season | | | | | | Playoffs | | | Refs |
| # | Name | Dates | GC | W | L | T | Pts | Win % | GC | W | L | Refs |
|---|---|---|---|---|---|---|---|---|---|---|---|---|
| 1 | Bert Olmstead | 1967 – 1968 | 64 | 11 | 37 | 16 | 38 | .148 | — | | | |
| 2 | Gord Fashoway | 1968 | 10 | 4 | 5 | 1 | 9 | .450 | — | | | |
| 3 | Fred Glover | 1968 – 1971 | 233 | 71 | 130 | 32 | 174 | .373 | 11 | 3 | 8 | |
| 4 | Vic Stasiuk | 1971 – 1972 | 75 | 21 | 38 | 16 | 58 | .387 | — | | | |
| 5 | Garry Young | 1972 | 12 | 2 | 7 | 3 | 7 | .292 | — | | | |
| — | Fred Glover | 1972 – 1974 | 113 | 25 | 77 | 21 | 71 | .289 | — | | | |
| 6 | Marshall Johnston | 1974 – 1975 | 69 | 13 | 45 | 11 | 37 | .268 | — | | | |
| 7 | Bill McCreary Sr. | 1975 | 32 | 8 | 20 | 4 | 20 | .313 | — | | | |
| 8 | Jack Evans | 1975 – 1976 | 80 | 27 | 42 | 11 | 65 | .406 | — | | | |

== See also ==
- List of NHL head coaches
