= Bill LaForge =

Canadian ice hockey coach (1951–2005)

- Born: September 2, 1951; Edmonton, Alberta, Canada
- Died: June 19, 2005 (aged 53); Edmonton, Alberta, Canada
- Occupation: Ice hockey coach

Bill LaForge (September 2, 1951 – June 19, 2005) was a Canadian ice hockey coach. LaForge briefly coached the Vancouver Canucks in National Hockey League, but enjoyed more success in junior ice hockey with Western Hockey League and the Ontario Hockey League teams. LaForge was known for his controversial coaching style, intimidation tactics, on-ice brawls, suspensions and fines. Teams he coached were known for physical play, and high scoring. Notable players coached by LaForge in junior ice hockey include Shayne Corson, Keith Primeau, Dean Evason, Gary Leeman, Tony Tanti, Brad May, Ken Daneyko, Doug Bodger, Garth Butcher, and Rob Brown. LaForge died June 19, 2005, after an apparent heart attack.

== Background ==
LaForge was related to Patrick LaForge, the former president of the Edmonton Oilers. Depending on the source, they were either brothers, or cousins. Through his relation to Patrick LaForge, he was also a distant cousin of Pierre Boivin, former president of the Montreal Canadiens. LaForge was married to Penny and had four children. His son, Bil LaForge, was a team executive in junior ice hockey and the general manager for the Seattle Thunderbirds of the Western Hockey League. LaForge played hockey and football at Archbishop MacDonald High School. He later played for the Edmonton Huskies and attended training camp for the Calgary Stampeders in 1974, but did not pass the physical due to an injury sustained working at a construction site. LaForge began coaching hockey as the recreational director of the Enoch Cree Nation.

== Coaching style ==
LaForge used his football background in teaching his teams to be a physical club, and stressed team first, instead of the name on the back of the jersey. LaForge's coaching mantra was a PhD in hockey: pride, hustle and desire.

One thing I will be teaching is how to hit. We'll use football hitting and tackling dummies. P-H-D will bring success. You have to have "pride" in yourself and your team. "Hustle" for yourself and your team, and you have to have "desire" for yourself and your team.

— Bill LaForge

He used unorthodox coaching methods, punishing emphasis on physical play, and humiliating practices. LaForge used intimidation tactics such as staring down opposing teams during warm-ups, and had a stoplight installed in his team's dressing room in Hamilton. The stoplight was red between periods meaning, players were not allowed to fight, but once it turned green at the start of a period, players could fight. He was also a caring person. LaForge once legally adopted a player to be his coach and mentor. He insisted on players attending school, and keeping an active mind.

Bill had this rough and gruff image, but he was actually very kind at heart. He was good to our family. Every time I ran into him he’d ask about my wife and kids.

— Doug Lidster

== Coaching career ==
=== Oshawa Generals ===
LaForge began his major junior coaching career with the Oshawa Generals in the 1980–81 OHL season. LaForge took over a young team, without many expectations. Oshawa lost their first game 0–6 to Windsor, but established a pattern of physical play with five fights and two brawls in the match, to start the season. By the end of the season, Oshawa led the league with 3198 penalty minutes, averaging of 47 minutes per game, compared to the second most penalized team in the league had only 2092 penalty minutes. LaForge led the Generals to fourth place in the Leyden division, and a playoff berth. Oshawa faced the Peterborough Petes in a best-of-five preliminary round in the playoffs. The series was highly anticipated considering the historic rivalry between the teams, and Peterborough winning the J. Ross Robertson Cup each of the three previous seasons. The teams split the first four games, each winning twice on home ice. During the pregame skate before game five, a brawl ensued between the two teams, including a physical altercation between LaForge and Peterborough coach Dave Dryden. Order had to be restored by local policemen, as the referee and linesmen were not on the ice at the time. LaForge later received a 50-game suspension. When the game was finally completed, Oshawa won by a 6–2 score. LaForge led the Generals into the best-of-seven quarterfinals against the Sault Ste. Marie Greyhounds, losing the series in six games. LaForge resigned following the season.

=== Regina Pats ===
LaForge moved back west to coach the Regina Pats in the 1981–82 WHL season. LaForge never served the 50–game suspension imposed by the OHL, due to switching leagues. LaForge quickly established another physical team in Regina. There were two on-ice brawls in preseason games, eighteen during the regular season, and six more in the playoffs. LaForge was suspended three times during the season as a result. The Pats led the league with 3412 penalty minutes, having four players with 300-plus penalty minutes, including Al Tuer who led the league with 486 penalty minutes, and team captain Garth Butcher had 318 penalty minutes. Despite the penalty minutes, Regina scored the most goals in the WHL with 465, had five players with 50–goal seasons, and featured the top two point scorers in the league; Jock Callander and Dave Michayluk. Regina finished the season second place in the east division. In the playoffs, Regina defeated the Brandon Wheat Kings 4 games to 0 in the first round, defeated the Calgary Wranglers three games to one in the second round, and defeated the first place Lethbridge Broncos four games to three to reach the WHL finals. LaForge and the Pats lost to the Portland Winterhawks four games to one. In the 3–5 loss in game four of the finals, LaForge's team amassed 190 penalty minutes and incited an on-ice brawl after the game ended.

=== Kamloops Junior Oilers ===
LaForge moved onto his next team, the Kamloops Junior Oilers for the 1982–83 WHL season. He took over a team that won only 18 games the previous season. Kamloops finished third place in west division with 46 wins, and earned 92 points. LaForge's team led the west division with 1937 penalty minutes. Despite a notable decrease in penalty minutes from previous LaForge teams, Kamloops still managed to get into seven brawls during the season. The Victoria Cougars defeated Kamloops four games to three in the division semifinals.

LaForge remained with the Junior Oilers for the 1983–84 WHL season, and improved the team's record to first place in the west division, with 50 wins and 100 points. Kamloops led the league with 467 goals scored, and led the west division with 1865 penalty minutes, including ten brawls. Kamloops swept through the first two rounds of the playoffs defeating the Seattle Breakers, and then the Portland Winter Hawks both by five games to none. In the finals, LaForge met up with his former team, and defeated the Regina Pats in seven games to win the President's Cup and the WHL Championship. Laforge and the Junior Oilers moved on to the 1984 Memorial Cup hosted by the Kitchener Rangers. Kamloops lost game one to the Kitchener Rangers 7–9, and lost game two to the Ottawa 67's 1–5. Facing the also winless Laval Voisins, LaForge pulled out a 4–3 win. In the semifinal versus Ottawa, the Junior Oilers lost 2–7.

=== Vancouver Canucks ===
LaForge was 32 years old when hired to coach in the National Hockey League. LaForge was announced as the new head coach of the Vancouver Canucks for the 1984-85 NHL season, the day after the semifinal game of the 1984 Memorial Cup. Canucks general manager Harry Neale chose LaForge over Mike Keenan, believing that LaForge would motivate the often laid-back NHL team. LaForge's NHL coaching career began with a 2–5 loss to the Quebec Nordiques, then a 6–5 overtime win versus the Los Angeles Kings. Vancouver then went on a nine-game losing streak, including losses of 2–13 to the Philadelphia Flyers, 0–7 to the Edmonton Oilers, and 3–10 to the Los Angeles Kings. Frustration was evident in the loss to the Flyers which included seven fights and two brawls. LaForge lasted only twenty games into the 1984–85 Vancouver Canucks season, being fired by Neale after a 1–5 loss to the St. Louis Blues on November 20, with only four wins and two ties.

=== Hamilton Steelhawks ===
After being fired from Vancouver, LaForge returned to junior hockey, coaching the Hamilton Steelhawks for the remainder of the 1984–85 OHL season as mid-season replacement for Dave Draper. LaForge took over an under achieving team and built them into a physical presence. On March 9, the Hamilton Steelhawks played the Sault Ste. Marie Greyhounds in the televised OHL game of the week, that resulted in a bench-clearing brawl in the second period. A total of 164 minutes in penalties, including 14 fighting majors and 10 game misconducts were called. The Steelhawks were fined $2,000 and LaForge was suspended for the balance of the season, including the playoffs. The Steelhawks managed to finished fourth place in the Emms division and amass 1641 penalty minutes.

LaForge returned behind the bench for the 1985–86 OHL season. The Steelhawks struggled in a rebuilding season as the team was mostly 17-year-olds. Hamilton finished seventh place in the Emms division and missed the playoffs, but managed to lead the league with 2060 penalty minutes.

LaForge had a lot of returning players for the 1986–87 OHL season, and improved the team's record to second place Emms division. The Steelhawks accrued 1632 penalty minutes, fifth highest in the league. In the playoffs, Hamilton defeated the Guelph Platers four games to one in the first round, but were swept in four games by the Windsor Spitfires in the second round.

In the 1987–88 OHL season, LaForge led the Steelhawks to a third-place finish in the Emms division, and led the league with 2232 penalty minutes. Ten different players on LaForge's team had at least 100 penalty minutes. In the playoffs, Hamilton defeated the North Bay Centennials four games to none in the first round. The Steelhawks defeated the London Knights four games to two in round two. In the third round, LaForge's team was swept out of the playoffs again in four games by Windsor Spitfires.

=== Niagara Falls Thunder ===
The Hamilton Steelhawks relocated to Niagara Falls, Ontario for the 1988–89 OHL season, and were renamed the Niagara Falls Thunder. LaForge led the Thunder to a second-place finish in the Emms division, and led the league with 2280 penalty minutes. LaForge's team led league with 410 goals, including the league's top two scorers in Bryan Fogarty and Stan Drulia, and an additional seven players with at least 20 goals. In the playoffs, Niagara Falls swept the Windsor Spitfires in the first round, earned a bye in the second round, then won a hard fought seven game series versus the London Knights in round three. LaForge and the Thunder were upset by the Peterborough Petes in six games in the finals, by the well disciplined Petes, compared to the many penalties taken by the Thunder. LaForge's aggressive coaching style was blamed for costing the Thunder a chance at the Memorial Cup, as they had been one of the top ranked team in the league all season with high expectations going into the finals.

LaForge continued to make headlines into the 1989–90 OHL season, by legally adopting Trevor Renkers to facilitate coaching the prospect. Renkers played only one game for the Niagara Falls Thunder, scoring a goal, and taking four penalty minutes. Twenty games into the season LaForge's team had a record of 4 wins, 14 losses and 2 ties. Team owner Rick Gay had grown tired of LaForge's antics by this time, fired LaForge and replaced him with George Burnett.

=== Later career ===
LaForge was hired by Tri-City Americans owner Ron Dixon on December 17, 1989 as director of player personnel. After the Christmas break, LaForge altered the dressing room to make it smaller, and took over running a team practice. The players revolted and refused to play under his supervision in the next league game on December 30, 1989 vs the Portland Winterhawks. LaForge was reassigned to scouting duties for the remainder of the 1989–90 WHL season.

LaForge was the third of three head coaches for the Guelph Storm during the 1991–92 OHL season. LaForge was hired to replace interim head coach and general manager, Mike Kelly. LaForge's team included both his son Bill LaForge Jr, and his adopted son Trevor Renkers. Guelph won just four games that season, finishing last place in the league. In typical LaForge syle, his team led the league with 1767 penalty minutes. LaForge was fired at the end of the season.

LaForge coached the Bismarck Bulls of the American Hockey Association for the 1992–93 season. Bismarck finished last place in the standings, but led the league penalties with 1146 minutes in 35 games.

LaForge was head coach of the Bonnyville Pontiacs of the Alberta Junior Hockey League for the 1993–94 season. The team finished tied for 8th, and last place with the Lloydminster Blazers.

LaForge filled in as a replacement coach with the Nashville Nighthawks of the Central Hockey League near the end of the 1996-97 season. LaForge took over the final eleven games for player-head coach Iain Duncan, winning two and losing nine games to finish the season. LaForge's coaching career finished with fisticuffs, including a brawl in the second last game, and six fights in the final game of the season.

== Coaching record ==
Regular season and postseason coaching statistics.

Season	Team	League	Regular season							Playoffs
Season	Team	League	G	W	L	T	OTL	Pts	Finish	Result
1980–81	Oshawa Generals	OHL	68	35	30	3	—	73	4th in Leyden	Lost in round 2
1981–82	Regina Pats	WHL	72	48	24	0	—	96	2nd in East	Lost in finals
1982–83	Kamloops Junior Oilers	WHL	72	46	26	0	—	92	3rd in West	Lost in round 2
1983–84	Kamloops Junior Oilers	WHL	72	50	22	0	—	100	1st in West	Won championship 3rd place Memorial Cup
1984–85	Vancouver Canucks	NHL	20	4	14	2	—	(59)	5th in Smythe	(fired)
1984–85	Hamilton Steelhawks	OHL	—	—	—	—	—	(—)	4th in Emms	Lost in round 3
1985–86	Hamilton Steelhawks	OHL	66	26	36	4	—	56	7th in Emms	Out of playoffs
1986–87	Hamilton Steelhawks	OHL	66	39	24	3	—	81	2nd in Emms	Lost in round 2
1987–88	Hamilton Steelhawks	OHL	66	35	28	3	—	73	3rd in Emms	Lost in round 3
1988–89	Niagara Falls Thunder	OHL	66	41	23	2	—	84	2nd in Emms	Lost in finals
1989–90	Niagara Falls Thunder	OHL	20	4	14	2	—	(10)	6th in Emms	(fired)
1991–92	Guelph Storm	OHL	—	—	—	—	—	(—)	8th in Emms	Out of playoffs
1992–93	Bismarck Bulls	AHA	35	7	27	0	1	15	5th in AHA	League folded
1993–94	Bonnyville Pontiacs	AJHL	56	15	37	—	4	34	8th in AJHL	Out of playoffs
1996–97	Nashville Nighthawks	CHL	11	2	9	—	0	4	5th in Eastern	Out of playoffs
TOTALS		OHL	352	180	155	17	—	377	—	1 finalist
TOTALS		WHL	216	144	72	0	—	288	1 division title	1 championship 1 finalist

Preceded by Harry Neale	Head coach of the Vancouver Canucks; 1984	Succeeded by Harry Neale
