= List of Hartford Whalers head coaches =

The Hartford Whalers were an ice hockey team who played in both the National Hockey League (NHL) and the World Hockey Association (WHA). This is a list of the head coaches they had during their existence. The franchise moved to Raleigh, North Carolina in 1997 and became the Carolina Hurricanes

== Key ==
#	Number of coaches^{[a]}
GC	Games coached
W	Wins
L	Losses
T	Ties
Pts	Points
*	Spent entire NHL coaching career with the Whalers

== WHA coaches ==
#	Name	Term	Regular season					Playoffs			Results
#	Name	Term	GC	W	L	T	Pts	GC	W	L	Results
1	Jack Kelley	1972-1973	78	46	30	2	94	15	12	3	Avco World Trophy (1972)
2	Ron Ryan	1973-1975	151	83	59	9	175	7	3	4	Howard Baldwin Trophy (1973); Replaced near end of season
–	Jack Kelley	1975	38	17	18	3	37	6	2	4	Replaced midway through season
3	Don Blackburn	1975-76	35	14	18	3	31	-	-	-	Replaced midway through season
4	Harry Neale	1976-1978	173	84	77	12	180	36	19	17	Lost 1978 Avco Cup to Winnipeg
5	Bill Dineen	1978-1979	71	33	29	9	75	-	-	-	Replaced near end of season
-	Don Blackburn	1979	9	4	5	0	8	10	5	5	Last coach for WHA Whalers

== NHL coaches ==
#	Name	Term	Regular season					Playoffs		
#	Name	Term	GC	W	L	T	Pts	GC	W	L
1	Don Blackburn	1979-1981	140	42	63	35	119	3	0	3
2	Larry Pleau	1981-1982	100	27	53	20	74	—	—	—
3	Larry Kish	1982-1983	49	12	32	5	29	—	—	—
4	John Cunniff	1983	13	3	9	1	7	—	—	—
5	Larry Pleau	1983	18	4	13	1	9	—	—	—
6	Jack Evans	1983-1988	374	163	174	37	363	16	8	8
7	Larry Pleau	1988-1989	106	50	51	5	105	10	2	8
8	Rick Ley	1989-1991	160	69	71	20	158	13	5	8
9	Jim Roberts	1991-1992	80	26	41	13	65	7	3	4
10	Paul Holmgren	1992-1993	101	30	63	8	68	—	—	—
11	Pierre McGuire	1993-1994	67	23	37	7	53	—	—	—
12	Paul Holmgren	1994-1995	60	24	30	6	54	—	—	—
13	Paul Maurice	1995-1997	152	61	72	19	141	—	—	—

== See also ==
- List of NHL head coaches
- List of Carolina Hurricanes head coaches
