= Jack Evans (ice hockey) =

Canadian ice hockey player (1928–1996)

- Born: April 21, 1928 Morriston, Wales, U.K.
- Died: November 10, 1996 (aged 68) Manchester, Connecticut, U.S.
- Height: 6 ft 0 in (183 cm)
- Weight: 185 lb (84 kg; 13 st 3 lb)
- Position: Defence
- Shot: Left
- Played for: New York Rangers; Chicago Black Hawks
- Playing career: 1946–1972

William John Trevor "Jack" Evans (April 21, 1928 – November 10, 1996) was a Welsh professional ice hockey defenceman and coach who played 14 seasons in the National Hockey League for the New York Rangers and Chicago Black Hawks between 1949 and 1963. With Chicago, he won the Stanley Cup in 1961. After his playing career, he worked as a coach, and coached the California Golden Seals, Cleveland Barons, and Hartford Whalers between 1975 and 1988.

== Early life ==
Evans was born in Morriston, Wales, but emigrated with his parents to Drumheller, Alberta, in his youth. He spoke only the Welsh Language and no English until he entered school, and later spoke the language with an elongated drawl; the similarities between Evans' manner of speaking and the traditional American Southern accent led to him earning the nickname of "Tex" from teammates. Although he did not begin playing hockey until age 14, by age 20, Evans was a leading junior league defenceman and participated in the 1948 Memorial Cup. That same year, he signed a minor league contract with the Rangers.

== Career ==
Evans played five games over the next two seasons while gaining experience in the American Hockey League. He would then spend the next four years as the Rangers' seventh defenceman, moving in and out of the lineup as needed and serving as a valuable defensive reserve. During the 1954–55 NHL season, Evans finally cracked the regular lineup and worked significant minutes for the next three years on the blue line. In 1958, he was claimed by Chicago, where he would play in a similar role for his final four seasons. He was a member of the 1961 Stanley Cup winning team making him the first Welsh born Stanley Cup Champion. Jack Evans played in the 1962 NHL All-Star game in Toronto also making him the first NHL All-Star player originating from Wales. In 1964, the Black Hawks released Evans, but the veteran continued to play in a variety of minor leagues until he finally retired in 1972 at the age of 44.

In 1974, Evans was hired to coach the Salt Lake Golden Eagles of the WHL. After one season that included coach of the year honours, he was promoted to the parent club California Golden Seals. He coached the anemic franchise in its final year in the San Francisco Bay Area and its two seasons as the Cleveland Barons before the financially-troubled organization merged with the Minnesota North Stars in 1978.

Evans returned to the ECHL bench before being hired by the Hartford Whalers in 1983. In his third season with the club, he earned a playoff berth, and in 1987, he led the club to a division title. A poor performance the following year resulted in Evans being fired mid-season.

== Personal life ==
Evans died of prostate cancer at his Manchester, Connecticut, home in 1996 at the age of 68.

== Career statistics ==
=== Regular season and playoffs ===
			Regular season					Playoffs
Season	Team	League	GP	G	A	Pts	PIM	GP	G	A	Pts	PIM
1947–48	Lethbridge Native Sons	AJHL	23	10	21	31	58	6	5	3	8	8
1947–48	Lethbridge Native Sons	WCSHL	1	0	0	0	0	—	—	—	—	—
1947–48	Lethbridge Native Sons	M-Cup	—	—	—	—	—	12	4	4	8	26
1948–49	New York Rangers	NHL	3	0	0	0	4	—	—	—	—	—
1948–49	Lethbridge Native Sons	WCSHL	48	7	10	17	124	3	0	0	0	8
1949–50	New York Rangers	NHL	3	0	0	0	2	—	—	—	—	—
1949–50	New Haven Ramblers	AHL	69	3	12	15	150	—	—	—	—	—
1950–51	New York Rangers	NHL	49	1	0	1	95	—	—	—	—	—
1950–51	Cincinnati Mohawks	AHL	16	3	3	6	56	—	—	—	—	—
1951–52	New York Rangers	NHL	52	1	6	7	83	—	—	—	—	—
1952–53	Saskatoon Quakers	WHL	68	9	22	31	179	13	0	3	3	16
1953–54	New York Rangers	NHL	44	4	4	8	73	—	—	—	—	—
1953–54	Saskatoon Quakers	WHL	27	2	3	5	49	—	—	—	—	—
1954–55	New York Rangers	NHL	47	0	5	5	91	—	—	—	—	—
1954–55	Saskatoon Quakers	WHL	22	2	4	6	16	—	—	—	—	—
1954–55	Vancouver Canucks	WHL	—	—	—	—	—	1	0	0	0	2
1955–56	New York Rangers	NHL	70	2	9	11	99	5	1	0	1	18
1956–57	New York Rangers	NHL	70	3	6	9	116	—	—	—	—	—
1957–58	New York Rangers	NHL	70	4	8	12	108	6	0	0	0	17
1958–59	Chicago Black Hawks	NHL	70	1	8	9	75	6	0	0	0	10
1959–60	Chicago Black Hawks	NHL	68	0	4	4	60	4	0	0	0	4
1960–61	Chicago Black Hawks	NHL	47	0	5	5	91	12	1	1	2	14
1961–62	Chicago Black Hawks	NHL	70	3	14	17	80	12	0	0	0	26
1962–63	Chicago Black Hawks	NHL	69	0	8	8	46	6	0	0	0	4
1963–64	Buffalo Bisons	AHL	72	0	17	17	87	—	—	—	—	—
1964–65	Los Angeles Blades	WHL	69	2	13	15	91	—	—	—	—	—
1965–66	Vancouver Canucks	WHL	72	2	31	33	103	7	0	1	1	20
1966–67	California Seals	WHL	71	3	18	21	52	6	0	2	2	4
1967–68	San Diego Gulls	WHL	65	1	15	16	36	7	0	3	3	8
1968–69	San Diego Gulls	WHL	73	1	11	12	50	7	0	0	0	0
1969–70	San Diego Gulls	WHL	67	0	8	8	46	6	0	0	0	2
1970–71	San Diego Gulls	WHL	69	1	10	11	82	6	0	2	2	12
1971–72	San Diego Gulls	WHL	72	0	20	20	87	4	0	0	0	4
WHL totals			675	23	155	178	791	57	0	11	11	68
NHL totals			754	19	80	99	990	56	2	4	6	97

=== NHL Coaching record ===
Team	Year	Regular season						Postseason
Team	Year	G	W	L	T	Pts	Finish	Result
California Golden Seals	1975–76	80	27	42	11	65	4th in Adams	Missed playoffs
Cleveland Barons	1976–77	80	25	42	13	63	4th in Adams	Missed playoffs
Cleveland Barons	1977–78	80	22	45	13	57	4th in Adams	Missed playoffs
Hartford Whalers	1983–84	80	28	42	10	66	5th in Adams	Missed playoffs
Hartford Whalers	1984–85	80	30	41	9	69	5th in Adams	Missed playoffs
Hartford Whalers	1985–86	80	40	36	4	84	4th in Adams	Lost in 2nd Round
Hartford Whalers	1986–87	80	43	30	7	93	1st in Adams	Lost in 1st Round
Hartford Whalers	1987–88	54	22	25	7	51	4th in Adams	Fired
NHL totals		614	237	303	74			

== See also ==
- List of National Hockey League players from the United Kingdom

Preceded by Bill McCreary, Sr.	Head coach of the California Golden Seals / Cleveland Barons; 1975–78	Succeeded by Position abolished
Preceded by John Cunniff; Larry Pleau	Head coach of the Hartford Whalers; 1983–87; 1987–89	Succeeded by Larry Pleau
