= Vic Stasiuk =

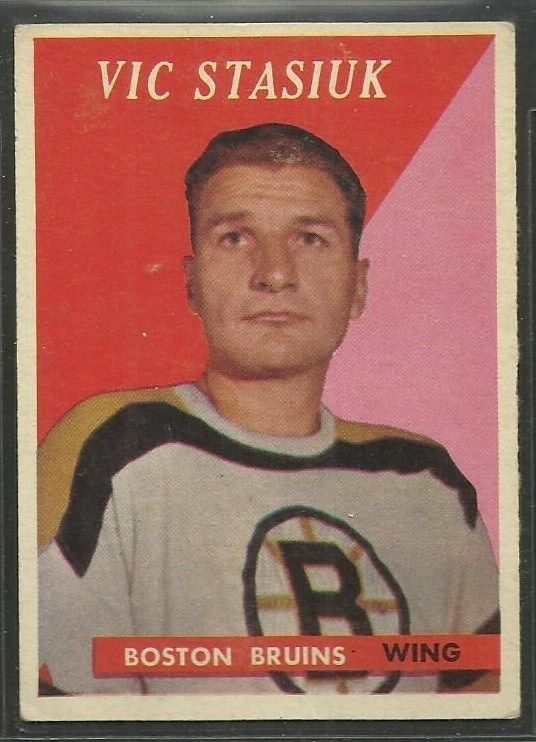
- Born: May 23, 1929 Lethbridge, Alberta, Canada
- Died: May 7, 2023 (aged 93) Lethbridge, Alberta, Canada
- Height: 6 ft 1 in (185 cm)
- Weight: 185 lb (84 kg; 13 st 3 lb)
- Position: Left wing
- Shot: Left
- Played for: Chicago Black Hawks; Detroit Red Wings; Boston Bruins
- Coached for: Philadelphia Flyers; California Golden Seals; Vancouver Canucks
- Playing career: 1950–1966
- Coaching career: 1963–1979

Victor John Stasiuk (May 23, 1929 – May 7, 2023) was a Canadian professional ice hockey left winger and coach. He played in the National Hockey League from 1949 to 1963 and then served as a coach from 1969 to 1973.

== Playing career ==
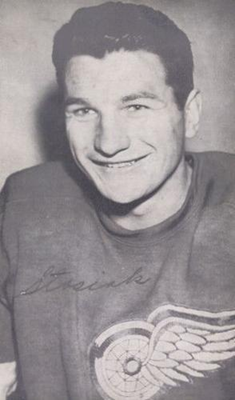
1950s postcard of Vic Stasiuk for Detroit Red Wings

Stasiuk played junior hockey in his native Lethbridge, Alberta before signing with the Chicago Black Hawks. He played sparingly in Chicago and was traded to the Detroit Red Wings in 1951. He spent time in the minors with the Indianapolis Capitals and the Edmonton Flyers where he put up great numbers leading the Flyers in scoring with 37 goals, 43 assists during the regular season, as the Flyers won the 1953 WHL championship. He was also selected to the WHL First All-Star Team. He was part of three Stanley Cup teams in 1952, 1954, and 1955; he had one assist in the 1952 Final, did not participate in the 1954 Final due to being in the minor leagues, and recorded three goals and three assists in the 1955 Final (although Stasiuk played 42 regular season games for Detroit in 1954, his name was left off the Stanley Cup that year). During the team’s cup run in 1955 Stasiuk contributed 8 points in 11 games.

In 1955, Stasiuk was traded to the Boston Bruins and found chemistry with Johnny Bucyk and Bronco Horvath, a grouping dubbed "The Uke line" because of the Ukrainian ancestry of the three players. Stasiuk scored 20 or more goals in four consecutive seasons with Boston from 1957-60. During the 1957-58 season, the line became the first in NHL history to have all three participants reach the 20-goal mark. In 1960, Stasiuk scored a career-high 68 points, and he was selected to play in the NHL All-Star Game. In 1961, he was traded back to Detroit, helping the Red Wings reach the 1961 Stanley Cup Final that spring. He played the next season in Detroit and split the 1962-63 season between the Red Wings and the AHL Pittsburgh Hornets, but was back in Detroit for their playoff run, helping the Red Wings reach the 1963 Stanley Cup Final, before finishing his career in the minors. He played for the Chicago Black Hawks, Detroit Red Wings, and Boston Bruins, He recorded 183 goals and 254 assists in 745 NHL games.

== Coaching career ==
After retiring, Stasiuk moved to coaching. He took over the Pittsburgh Hornets of the American Hockey League for two seasons and later led the same league's Quebec Aces to back-to-back losses in the Calder Cup finals. in 1967–68 he was awarded the inaugural Louis A. R. Pieri Memorial Award. Immediately after coaching the EHL Jersey Devils from 1966–68, Stasiuk earned a job with the Philadelphia Flyers. His team finished out of the playoffs by a single point in 1969-70 and then was eliminated in the first round of the postseason the next year. Stasiuk was fired after the 1970-71 season; the Flyers offered him a scouting position, but he took a head coaching job three games into the NHL season with the California Golden Seals. Stasiuk was fired after the season due to a stylistic conflict with management, and he then spent one year behind the bench of the Vancouver Canucks before settling into a career in junior hockey coaching, both in Taber coaching them to back to back finals appearances in 1976 and 1977 he finished he coaching career with Medicine Hat in 1979.

== Retirement ==
During his retirement Stasiuk enjoyed playing golf, Stasiuk also owned a farm which he converted into Paradise Canyon Golf Course in Lethbridge which he managed for most of his retirement. After his passing the new owners built a lounge area titled Vic’s lounge in his honor.

Stasiuk was married to his wife Mary, he was a father to his 4 children, Vanessa, Elsa , Victor Jr. and JaeJae, he was a grandfather to 10 grandchildren and a great grandfather to 16.

He was viewed as a legendary figure in his home town of Lethbridge and was inducted as an inaugural member of the Lethbridge Sports Hall of Fame in 1985. He's been described as a pivotal reason to the success southern Alberta hockey players have to this day and the pioneer of hockey in Lethbridge. Kris Versteeg commented on Stasiuk stating “He was a trailblazer, especially for the Lethbridge hockey community,"

In 2009 he was inducted into the Alberta Sports Hall of Fame & Museum in 2009, In 2018 he was inducted into the Ukrainian Sports Hall of Fame.

Stasiuk died at a Lethbridge nursing home on May 7, 2023, at the age of 93.

In 2023 he would be named one of the top 100 best Bruins players of all time.

== Career statistics ==
=== Regular season and playoffs ===
			Regular season					Playoffs
Season	Team	League	GP	G	A	Pts	PIM	GP	G	A	Pts	PIM
1946–47	Lethbridge Native Sons	AJHL	9	0	6	6	11	1	1	1	2	0
1947–48	Wetaskiwin Canadians	EJrHL	—	—	—	—	—	—	—	—	—	—
1948–49	Kansas City Pla-Mors	USHL	66	7	13	20	52	2	0	0	0	0
1949–50	Chicago Black Hawks	NHL	17	1	1	2	2	—	—	—	—	—
1949–50	Kansas City Pla-Mors	USHL	39	10	13	23	27	—	—	—	—	—
1950–51	Chicago Black Hawks	NHL	20	5	3	8	6	—	—	—	—	—
1950–51	Detroit Red Wings	NHL	50	3	10	13	12	—	—	—	—	—
1951–52	Detroit Red Wings	NHL	58	5	9	14	19	7	0	2	2	0
1951–52	Indianapolis Capitals	AHL	8	7	1	8	6	—	—	—	—	—
1952–53	Detroit Red Wings	NHL	3	0	0	0	0	—	—	—	—	—
1952–53	Edmonton Flyers	WHL	48	37	43	80	71	—	—	—	—	—
1953–54	Detroit Red Wings	NHL	42	5	2	7	4	—	—	—	—	—
1953–54	Edmonton Flyers	WHL	21	6	12	18	37	13	2	6	8	23
1954–55	Detroit Red Wings	NHL	59	8	11	19	67	11	5	3	8	6
1954–55	Edmonton Flyers	WHL	11	7	6	13	32	—	—	—	—	—
1955–56	Boston Bruins	NHL	59	19	18	37	118	—	—	—	—	—
1956–57	Boston Bruins	NHL	64	24	16	40	69	10	2	1	3	2
1957–58	Boston Bruins	NHL	70	21	35	56	55	12	0	5	5	13
1958–59	Boston Bruins	NHL	70	27	33	60	63	7	4	2	6	11
1959–60	Boston Bruins	NHL	60	29	39	68	121	—	—	—	—	—
1960–61	Boston Bruins	NHL	46	5	25	30	35	—	—	—	—	—
1960–61	Detroit Red Wings	NHL	23	10	13	23	16	11	2	5	7	4
1961–62	Detroit Red Wings	NHL	59	15	28	43	45	—	—	—	—	—
1962–63	Detroit Red Wings	NHL	36	6	11	17	37	11	3	0	3	4
1962–63	Pittsburgh Hornets	AHL	22	9	20	29	24	—	—	—	—	—
1963–64	Pittsburgh Hornets	AHL	42	10	10	20	32	5	0	0	0	4
1964–65	Pittsburgh Hornets	AHL	63	14	21	35	58	3	0	0	0	0
1965–66	Memphis Wings	CHL	25	9	3	12	14	—	—	—	—	—
NHL totals			745	183	254	437	669	69	16	18	34	40

== Head coaching record ==
Team	Year	Regular season						Postseason			
Team	Year	G	W	L	T	Pts	Finish	W	L	Win %	Result
PHI	1969–70	76	17	35	24	58	5th in West	—	—	—	Missed playoffs
PHI	1970–71	78	28	33	17	73	3rd in West	0	4	.000	Lost in quarterfinals (CHI)
CGS	1971–72	75	21	38	16	58	6th in West	—	—	—	Missed playoffs
VAN	1972–73	78	22	47	9	53	7th in East	—	—	—	Missed playoffs
NHL total		307	88	153	66			0	4	.000	1 playoff appearance

== Awards and achievements ==
- Stanley Cup Champion (1952,1954, 1955)
- Played in the 1961 NHL All-Star Game
- WHL Champion (1953)
- WHL First All-Star Team (1953)
- Elizabeth C. Dufresne Trophy (1959)
- Louis A. R. Pieri Memorial Award (1968)
- Inducted into the Lethbridge Sports Hall of Fame in 1985
- Inducted into the Alberta Sports Hall of Fame in 2009
- Inducted into the Ukrainian Sports Hall of Fame in 2018
- Named one of the top 100 best Bruins players of all time

== See also ==
- List of ice hockey line nicknames

Preceded by Keith Allen	Head coach of the Philadelphia Flyers; 1969–1971	Succeeded by Fred Shero
Preceded by Fred Glover	Head coach of the California Golden Seals; 1971–1972	Succeeded by Garry Young
Preceded by Hal Laycoe	Head coach of the Vancouver Canucks; 1972–1973	Succeeded by Bill McCreary
