= 1941–42 Boston Bruins season =

National Hockey League team season

1941–42 Boston Bruins
- League: 3rd NHL
- 1941–42 record: 25–17–6
- Home record: 17–4–3
- Road record: 8–13–3
- Goals for: 160
- Goals against: 118

Team information
- General manager: Art Ross
- Coach: Art Ross
- Captain: Dit Clapper
- Arena: Boston Garden

Team leaders
- Goals: Roy Conacher (24)
- Assists: Bobby Bauer (22); Eddie Wiseman (22)
- Points: Roy Conacher (37)
- Penalty minutes: Des Smith (70)
- Wins: Frank Brimsek (24)
- Goals against average: Frank Brimsek (2.35)

The 1941–42 Boston Bruins season, was the team's 18th season. They placed third in the National Hockey League (NHL).

== Offseason ==
Milt Schmidt and Woody Dumart were identified as two players to be called to Canada for compulsory training in the armed forces, potentially breaking up the Bruins' top line. Canadian authorities threatened to disallow any single men between the ages of 21 and 25 from leaving Canada to play ice hockey. However, the two were not called to the forces and played another season for the Bruins.

== Regular season ==
On December 9, 1941, the Chicago Blackhawks-Boston Bruins game would be delayed for over a half hour as United States President Franklin Delano Roosevelt declared that America was at war.

=== Final standings ===
National Hockey League
	GP	W	L	T	Pts	GF	GA
**New York Rangers**	48	29	17	2	60	177	143
**Toronto Maple Leafs**	48	27	18	3	57	158	136
**Boston Bruins**	48	25	17	6	56	160	118
**Chicago Black Hawks**	48	22	23	3	47	145	155
**Detroit Red Wings**	48	19	25	4	42	140	147
**Montreal Canadiens**	48	18	27	3	39	134	173
Brooklyn Americans	48	16	29	3	35	133	175

Note: GP = Games played, W = Wins, L = Losses, T = Ties, Pts = Points, GF = Goals for, GA = Goals against
Teams that qualified for the playoffs are highlighted in bold.

=== Record vs. opponents ===
1941–42 NHL Records
Team	BOS	BRK	CHI	DET	MTL	NYR	TOR
Boston	—	4–4	3–3–2	4–2–2	6–1–1	4–4	4–3–1
Brooklyn	4–4	—	2–6	3–4–1	3–4–1	2–5–1	2–6
Chicago	3–3–2	6–2	—	3–5	4–3–1	2–6	4–4
Detroit	2–4–2	4–3–1	5–3	—	5–3	1–7	2–5–1
Montreal	1–6–1	4–3–1	3–4–1	3–5	—	4–4	3–5
New York	4–4	5–2–1	6–2	7–1	4–4	—	3–4–1
Toronto	3–4–1	6–2	4–4	5–2–1	5–3	4–3–1	—

== Schedule and results ==
1941–42 regular season
November

Game	Result	Date	Score	Opponent	Record
1	L	November 8, 1941	0–2	@ Toronto Maple Leafs (1941–42)	0–1–0
2	W	November 15, 1941	2–1	@ New York Rangers (1941–42)	1–1–0
3	W	November 16, 1941	2–1	New York Rangers (1941–42)	2–1–0
4	W	November 18, 1941	7–2	Brooklyn Americans (1941–42)	3–1–0
5	L	November 20, 1941	2–3	@ Chicago Black Hawks (1941–42)	3–2–0
6	W	November 23, 1941	4–2	@ Detroit Red Wings (1941–42)	4–2–0
7	W	November 25, 1941	7–1	Detroit Red Wings (1941–42)	5–2–0
8	W	November 27, 1941	6–2 OT	@ Brooklyn Americans (1941–42)	6–2–0
9	W	November 29, 1941	3–1	@ Montreal Canadiens (1941–42)	7–2–0
10	W	November 30, 1941	3–2	Montreal Canadiens (1941–42)	8–2–0

December

Game	Result	Date	Score	Opponent	Record
11	W	December 2, 1941	3–1 OT	Toronto Maple Leafs (1941–42)	9–2–0
12	L	December 7, 1941	4–5	@ New York Rangers (1941–42)	9–3–0
13	T	December 9, 1941	2–2 OT	Chicago Black Hawks (1941–42)	9–3–1
14	T	December 14, 1941	3–3 OT	@ Chicago Black Hawks (1941–42)	9–3–2
15	W	December 16, 1941	4–0	Montreal Canadiens (1941–42)	10–3–2
16	W	December 20, 1941	4–2 OT	@ Montreal Canadiens (1941–42)	11–3–2
17	T	December 21, 1941	2–2 OT	@ Detroit Red Wings (1941–42)	11–3–3
18	W	December 23, 1941	3–2	New York Rangers (1941–42)	12–3–3
19	L	December 25, 1941	0–2	@ Toronto Maple Leafs (1941–42)	12–4–3
20	W	December 30, 1941	4–1	Toronto Maple Leafs (1941–42)	13–4–3

January

Game	Result	Date	Score	Opponent	Record
21	W	January 1, 1942	5–4	Brooklyn Americans (1941–42)	14–4–3
22	L	January 4, 1942	2–3	@ Brooklyn Americans (1941–42)	14–5–3
23	W	January 6, 1942	3–2	Chicago Black Hawks (1941–42)	15–5–3
24	W	January 13, 1942	2–1	Detroit Red Wings (1941–42)	16–5–3
25	W	January 18, 1942	4–3	@ Chicago Black Hawks (1941–42)	17–5–3
26	L	January 20, 1942	2–4	New York Rangers (1941–42)	17–6–3
27	L	January 22, 1942	3–4	@ Detroit Red Wings (1941–42)	17–7–3
28	T	January 24, 1942	2–2 OT	@ Montreal Canadiens (1941–42)	17–7–4
29	W	January 25, 1942	7–3	Montreal Canadiens (1941–42)	18–7–4
30	T	January 27, 1942	0–0 OT	Toronto Maple Leafs (1941–42)	18–7–5
31	L	January 29, 1942	4–5	@ Brooklyn Americans (1941–42)	18–8–5
32	W	January 31, 1942	3–2 OT	@ Toronto Maple Leafs (1941–42)	19–8–5

February

Game	Result	Date	Score	Opponent	Record
33	L	February 1, 1942	1–2	Brooklyn Americans (1941–42)	19–9–5
34	L	February 3, 1942	3–5 OT	Chicago Black Hawks (1941–42)	19–10–5
35	L	February 5, 1942	1–4	@ New York Rangers (1941–42)	19–11–5
36	W	February 8, 1942	3–0	Detroit Red Wings (1941–42)	20–11–5
37	W	February 10, 1942	8–1	Montreal Canadiens (1941–42)	21–11–5
38	L	February 15, 1942	0–2	@ Chicago Black Hawks (1941–42)	21–12–5
39	L	February 19, 1942	4–6	@ Brooklyn Americans (1941–42)	21–13–5
40	L	February 24, 1942	3–4	New York Rangers (1941–42)	21–14–5

March

Game	Result	Date	Score	Opponent	Record
41	T	March 1, 1942	3–3 OT	Detroit Red Wings (1941–42)	21–14–6
42	W	March 3, 1942	5–3	Toronto Maple Leafs (1941–42)	22–14–6
43	L	March 7, 1942	3–4 OT	@ Montreal Canadiens (1941–42)	22–15–6
44	L	March 8, 1942	1–3	@ Detroit Red Wings (1941–42)	22–16–6
45	W	March 10, 1942	9–1	Chicago Black Hawks (1941–42)	23–16–6
46	W	March 12, 1942	2–1	@ New York Rangers (1941–42)	24–16–6
47	L	March 14, 1942	4–6	@ Toronto Maple Leafs (1941–42)	24–17–6
48	W	March 17, 1942	8–3	Brooklyn Americans (1941–42)	25–17–6

Legend: Win (2 points) Loss (0 points) Tie (1 point)

== Playoffs ==
The Boston Bruins defeated the Chicago Black Hawks in the quarterfinals 2–1 but lost the semifinal to Detroit 2–0.

1942 Stanley Cup playoffs
Quarterfinals vs. (4) Chicago Black Hawks – Bruins win 2–1

Game	Date	Visitor	Score	Home	Series
1	March 22	Boston Bruins	2–1	Chicago Black Hawks	1–0
2	March 24	Chicago Black Hawks	4–0	Boston Bruins	1–1
3	March 26	Chicago Black Hawks	2–3	Boston Bruins	2–1

Semifinals vs. (5) Detroit Red Wings – Red Wings win 2–0

Game	Date	Visitor	Score	Home	Series
1	March 29	Detroit Red Wings	6–4	Boston Bruins	0–1
2	March 31	Boston Bruins	1–3	Detroit Red Wings	0–2

Legend: Win Loss

== Player statistics ==
=== Regular season ===
Scoring

Player	Pos	GP	G	A	Pts	PIM
Roy Conacher	LW	43	24	13	37	12
Milt Schmidt	C/D	36	14	21	35	34
Bobby Bauer	RW	36	13	22	35	11
Eddie Wiseman	RW	45	12	22	34	8
Flash Hollett	D	48	19	14	33	21
Woody Dumart	LW	35	14	15	29	8
Bill Cowley	C	28	4	23	27	6
Art Jackson	C	47	6	18	24	25
Jack McGill	C	13	8	11	19	2
Herb Cain	LW	34	8	10	18	2
Dutch Hiller	LW	43	7	10	17	19
Dit Clapper	RW/D	32	3	12	15	31
Des Smith	D	48	7	7	14	70
Busher Jackson	LW	26	5	7	12	18
Gordie Bruce	LW	15	4	8	12	11
Jack Crawford	D	43	2	9	11	37
Red Hamill	LW	9	6	3	9	2
Lloyd Gronsdahl	RW	10	1	2	3	0
Jack Shewchuk	D	22	2	0	2	14
Frank Mario	C	9	1	1	2	0
Clare Martin	D	13	0	1	1	4
Pat McReavy	C	6	0	1	1	0
Frank Brimsek	G	47	0	0	0	0
Nick Damore	G	1	0	0	0	0
Phil Hergesheimer	RW	3	0	0	0	2
Cliff Thompson	D	3	0	0	0	2

Goaltending

Player	MIN	GP	W	L	T	GA	GAA	SO
Frank Brimsek	2930	47	24	17	6	115	2.35	3
Nick Damore	60	1	1	0	0	3	3.00	0
Team:	2990	48	25	17	6	118	2.37	3

=== Playoffs ===
Scoring

Player	Pos	GP	G	A	Pts	PIM
Jack McGill	C	5	4	1	5	6
Gordie Bruce	LW	5	2	3	5	4
Roy Conacher	LW	5	2	1	3	0
Des Smith	D	5	1	2	3	2
Bill Cowley	C	5	0	3	3	5
Herb Cain	LW	5	1	0	1	0
Jack Crawford	D	5	0	1	1	4
Dutch Hiller	LW	5	0	1	1	0
Flash Hollett	D	5	0	1	1	2
Art Jackson	C	5	0	1	1	0
Busher Jackson	LW	5	0	1	1	0
Jack Shewchuk	D	5	0	1	1	7
Eddie Wiseman	RW	5	0	1	1	0
Frank Brimsek	G	5	0	0	0	0
Clare Martin	D	5	0	0	0	0

Goaltending

Player	MIN	GP	W	L	GA	GAA	SO
Frank Brimsek	307	5	2	3	16	3.13	0
Team:	307	5	2	3	16	3.13	0

Note:

Pos = Position;GP = Games played; G = Goals; A = Assists; Pts = Points; PIM = Penalty minutes; +/- = Plus/minus; PPG = Power-play goals; SHG = Short-handed goals; GWG = Game-winning goals
Pos = Position;GP = Games played; Min, TOI = Minutes played; W = Wins; L = Losses; T,T/OT = Ties; OTL = Overtime losses; GA = Goals-against; GAA = Goals-against average; SO = Shutouts; SA = Shots against; SV = Shots saved;SV% = Save percentage;

== See also ==
- 1941–42 NHL season
