= 1941–42 Montreal Canadiens season =

NHL hockey team season

1941–42 Montreal Canadiens
- League: 6th NHL
- 1941–42 record: 18–27–3
- Home record: 12–10–2
- Road record: 6–17–1
- Goals for: 134
- Goals against: 173

Team information
- General manager: Tommy Gorman
- Coach: Dick Irvin
- Captain: Toe Blake
- Arena: Montreal Forum

Team leaders
- Goals: Joe Benoit (20)
- Assists: Toe Blake (28)
- Points: Toe Blake (45)
- Penalty minutes: Ken Reardon (93)
- Wins: Paul Bibeault (17)
- Goals against average: Paul Bibeault (3.30)

The 1941–42 Montreal Canadiens season was the 33rd season in franchise history. The team placed sixth in the regular season to qualify for the playoffs. The Canadiens lost in the quarter-finals against the Detroit Red Wings 2 games to 1.

== Regular season ==
=== Final standings ===
National Hockey League
	GP	W	L	T	Pts	GF	GA
**New York Rangers**	48	29	17	2	60	177	143
**Toronto Maple Leafs**	48	27	18	3	57	158	136
**Boston Bruins**	48	25	17	6	56	160	118
**Chicago Black Hawks**	48	22	23	3	47	145	155
**Detroit Red Wings**	48	19	25	4	42	140	147
**Montreal Canadiens**	48	18	27	3	39	134	173
Brooklyn Americans	48	16	29	3	35	133	175

Note: GP = Games played, W = Wins, L = Losses, T = Ties, Pts = Points, GF = Goals for, GA = Goals against
Teams that qualified for the playoffs are highlighted in bold.

=== Record vs. opponents ===
1941–42 NHL Records
Team	BOS	BRK	CHI	DET	MTL	NYR	TOR
Boston	—	4–4	3–3–2	4–2–2	6–1–1	4–4	4–3–1
Brooklyn	4–4	—	2–6	3–4–1	3–4–1	2–5–1	2–6
Chicago	3–3–2	6–2	—	3–5	4–3–1	2–6	4–4
Detroit	2–4–2	4–3–1	5–3	—	5–3	1–7	2–5–1
Montreal	1–6–1	4–3–1	3–4–1	3–5	—	4–4	3–5
New York	4–4	5–2–1	6–2	7–1	4–4	—	3–4–1
Toronto	3–4–1	6–2	4–4	5–2–1	5–3	4–3–1	—

== Schedule and results ==
1941–42 regular season
November

Game	Result	Date	Score	Opponent	Record
1	L	November 1, 1941	2–3	Detroit Red Wings (1941–42)	0–1–0
2	T	November 8, 1941	2–2 OT	Chicago Black Hawks (1941–42)	0–1–1
3	L	November 13, 1941	2–4	@ Toronto Maple Leafs (1941–42)	0–2–1
4	L	November 15, 1941	2–4 OT	Brooklyn Americans (1941–42)	0–3–1
5	L	November 16, 1941	2–3	@ Brooklyn Americans (1941–42)	0–4–1
6	L	November 22, 1941	2–7	New York Rangers (1941–42)	0–5–1
7	W	November 23, 1941	6–4	@ New York Rangers (1941–42)	1–5–1
8	L	November 29, 1941	1–3	Boston Bruins (1941–42)	1–6–1
9	L	November 30, 1941	2–3	@ Boston Bruins (1941–42)	1–7–1

December

Game	Result	Date	Score	Opponent	Record
10	L	December 4, 1941	2–9	@ Chicago Black Hawks (1941–42)	1–8–1
11	L	December 6, 1941	1–3	@ Toronto Maple Leafs (1941–42)	1–9–1
12	L	December 7, 1941	2–3	@ Detroit Red Wings (1941–42)	1–10–1
13	W	December 11, 1941	2–1 OT	Toronto Maple Leafs (1941–42)	2–10–1
14	W	December 13, 1941	3–2 OT	Brooklyn Americans (1941–42)	3–10–1
15	W	December 14, 1941	4–2	@ Brooklyn Americans (1941–42)	4–10–1
16	L	December 16, 1941	0–4	@ Boston Bruins (1941–42)	4–11–1
17	L	December 20, 1941	2–4 OT	Boston Bruins (1941–42)	4–12–1
18	L	December 21, 1941	3–4 OT	@ New York Rangers (1941–42)	4–13–1
19	L	December 27, 1941	2–4	New York Rangers (1941–42)	4–14–1
20	W	December 30, 1941	5–3	Chicago Black Hawks (1941–42)	5–14–1

January

Game	Result	Date	Score	Opponent	Record
21	W	January 3, 1942	4–1	Detroit Red Wings (1941–42)	6–14–1
22	L	January 4, 1942	0–10	@ Detroit Red Wings (1941–42)	6–15–1
23	L	January 8, 1942	1–5	@ Chicago Black Hawks (1941–42)	6–16–1
24	L	January 10, 1942	0–2	Brooklyn Americans (1941–42)	6–17–1
25	W	January 11, 1942	2–0	@ Brooklyn Americans (1941–42)	7–17–1
26	L	January 15, 1942	2–3 OT	Toronto Maple Leafs (1941–42)	7–18–1
27	W	January 17, 1942	6–2	New York Rangers (1941–42)	8–18–1
28	L	January 18, 1942	4–5 OT	@ New York Rangers (1941–42)	8–19–1
29	T	January 24, 1942	2–2 OT	Boston Bruins (1941–42)	8–19–2
30	L	January 25, 1942	3–7	@ Boston Bruins (1941–42)	8–20–2
31	L	January 29, 1942	3–7	@ Toronto Maple Leafs (1941–42)	8–21–2

February

Game	Result	Date	Score	Opponent	Record
32	W	February 1, 1942	3–2	@ Chicago Black Hawks (1941–42)	9–21–2
33	L	February 5, 1942	3–4	Chicago Black Hawks (1941–42)	9–22–2
34	W	February 7, 1942	3–1	Detroit Red Wings (1941–42)	10–22–2
35	L	February 10, 1942	1–8	@ Boston Bruins (1941–42)	10–23–2
36	L	February 12, 1942	4–6	Toronto Maple Leafs (1941–42)	10–24–2
37	W	February 14, 1942	5–3	New York Rangers (1941–42)	11–24–2
38	L	February 15, 1942	0–5	@ Detroit Red Wings (1941–42)	11–25–2
39	W	February 17, 1942	2–1 OT	@ New York Rangers (1941–42)	12–25–2
40	W	February 21, 1942	5–3	Chicago Black Hawks (1941–42)	13–25–2
41	L	February 26, 1942	4–5	@ Chicago Black Hawks (1941–42)	13–26–2
42	W	February 28, 1942	8–3	Brooklyn Americans (1941–42)	14–26–2

March

Game	Result	Date	Score	Opponent	Record
43	T	March 1, 1942	1–1 OT	@ Brooklyn Americans (1941–42)	14–26–3
44	W	March 5, 1942	5–2	@ Toronto Maple Leafs (1941–42)	15–26–3
45	W	March 7, 1942	4–3 OT	Boston Bruins (1941–42)	16–26–3
46	W	March 14, 1942	4–3	Detroit Red Wings (1941–42)	17–26–3
47	L	March 15, 1942	1–4	@ Detroit Red Wings (1941–42)	17–27–3
48	W	March 19, 1942	7–3	Toronto Maple Leafs (1941–42)	18–27–3

Legend: Win (2 points) Loss (0 points) Tie (1 point)

== Playoffs ==
They went against Detroit in the first round in a best of three series and lost in three games, or 1–2.

== Player statistics ==
=== Regular season ===
==== Scoring ====
Player	Pos	GP	G	A	Pts	PIM
Toe Blake	LW	48	17	28	45	19
Joe Benoit	RW	46	20	16	36	27
Terry Reardon	C/RW	33	17	17	34	14
Charlie Sands	C/RW	38	11	16	27	6
Ray Getliffe	C/LW	45	11	15	26	35
Buddy O'Connor	C	36	9	16	25	4
John Quilty	C	48	12	12	24	44
Pete Morin	LW	31	10	12	22	7
Gerry Heffernan	RW	40	5	15	20	15
Ken Reardon	D	41	3	12	15	93
Jack Portland	D	46	2	9	11	53
Murph Chamberlain	LW	26	6	3	9	30
Tony Demers	RW	7	3	4	7	4
Bunny Dame	LW	34	2	5	7	4
Tony Graboski	LW/D	23	2	5	7	8
Red Goupille	D	47	1	5	6	51
Emile Bouchard	D	44	0	6	6	38
Jim Haggarty	LW	5	1	1	2	0
Red Heron	C	12	1	1	2	12
Rod Lorrain	RW	4	1	0	1	0
Elmer Lach	C	1	0	1	1	0
Jim O'Neil	C/RW	4	0	1	1	4
Stu Smith	LW	1	0	1	1	0
Connie Tudin	C	4	0	1	1	4
Paul Bibeault	G	38	0	0	0	0
Bert Gardiner	G	10	0	0	0	0
Leo Lamoureux	C/D	1	0	0	0	0

==== Goaltending ====
Player	MIN	GP	W	L	T	GA	GAA	SO
Paul Bibeault	2380	38	17	19	2	131	3.30	1
Bert Gardiner	620	10	1	8	1	42	4.06	0
Team:	3000	48	18	27	3	173	3.46	1

=== Playoffs ===
==== Scoring ====
Player	Pos	GP	G	A	Pts	PIM
Terry Reardon	C/RW	3	2	2	4	2
Jim Haggarty	LW	3	2	1	3	0
Gerry Heffernan	RW	2	2	1	3	0
Toe Blake	LW	3	0	3	3	2
Emile Bouchard	D	3	1	1	2	0
Joe Benoit	RW	3	1	0	1	5
Buddy O'Connor	C	3	0	1	1	0
John Quilty	C	3	0	1	1	0
Charlie Sands	C/RW	3	0	1	1	2
Paul Bibeault	G	3	0	0	0	0
Ray Getliffe	C/LW	3	0	0	0	0
Red Goupille	D	3	0	0	0	2
Red Heron	C	3	0	0	0	0
Pete Morin	LW	1	0	0	0	0
Jack Portland	D	3	0	0	0	0
Ken Reardon	D	3	0	0	0	4

==== Goaltending ====
Player	MIN	GP	W	L	GA	GAA	SO
Paul Bibeault	180	3	1	2	8	2.67	1
Team:	180	3	1	2	8	2.67	1

Note:

Pos = Position;GP = Games played; G = Goals; A = Assists; Pts = Points; PIM = Penalty minutes; +/- = Plus/minus; PPG = Power-play goals; SHG = Short-handed goals; GWG = Game-winning goals
Pos = Position;GP = Games played; Min, TOI = Minutes played; W = Wins; L = Losses; T,T/OT = Ties; OTL = Overtime losses; GA = Goals-against; GAA = Goals-against average; SO = Shutouts; SA = Shots against; SV = Shots saved;SV% = Save percentage;

== See also ==
- 1941–42 NHL season
