= 1941–42 NHL transactions =

The following is a list of all team-to-team transactions that have occurred in the National Hockey League (NHL) during the 1941–42 NHL season. It lists which team each player has been traded to and for which player(s) or other consideration(s), if applicable.

== Transactions ==
June 27, 1941	To Boston Bruins cash	To Brooklyn Americans Mel Hill
October 8, 1941	To Toronto Maple Leafs Viv Allen; Glenn Brydson	To Brooklyn Americans Phil McAtee return of Peanuts O'Flaherty (previously on loan)
October 30, 1941	To Toronto Maple Leafs Lorne Carr	To Brooklyn Americans future considerations (cash) loan of Gus Marker loan of Red Heron loan of Nick Knott
November 5, 1941	To Boston Bruins loan of Paul Gauthier for rest of 1941-42 season	To Montreal Canadiens loan of Terry Reardon for rest of 1941-42 season
November 24, 1941	To Boston Bruins Dutch Hiller $5,000 cash	To Detroit Red Wings Pat McReavy
December 18, 1941	To Boston Bruins cash	To Chicago Black Hawks Red Hamill
January 4, 1942	To Boston Bruins Busher Jackson	To Brooklyn Americans $7,500 cash
January 26, 1942	To Boston Bruins Phil Hergesheimer	To Chicago Black Hawks cash
February 2, 1942	To Toronto Maple Leafs cash	To Brooklyn Americans Jack Church
February 13, 1942	To Brooklyn Americans loan of Murph Chamberlain	To Montreal Canadiens loan of Red Heron
