= 1941–42 Chicago Black Hawks season =

NHL ice hockey team season

1941–42 Chicago Black Hawks
- League: 4th NHL
- 1941–42 record: 22–23–3
- Home record: 15–8–1
- Road record: 7–15–2
- Goals for: 145
- Goals against: 155

Team information
- General manager: Frederic McLaughlin
- Coach: Paul Thompson
- Captain: Earl Seibert
- Arena: Chicago Stadium

Team leaders
- Goals: Red Hamill (18)
- Assists: Bill Thoms (30)
- Points: Bill Thoms (45)
- Penalty minutes: John Mariucci (66)
- Wins: Sam LoPresti (21)
- Goals against average: Sam LoPresti (3.19)

The 1941–42 Chicago Black Hawks season was the team's 16th season in the NHL, and they were coming off a 5th-place finish in the 7 team league in 1940–41, and losing in the 2nd round of the playoffs against the Detroit Red Wings after defeating the Montreal Canadiens in the opening round.

The Black Hawks would finish just under .500, as they had a 22–23–3 record, good for 47 points and 4th place in the standings. Chicago would score 145 goals, 4th in the league, and let in 155, which was the 3rd highest. They had a very solid 15–8–1 home record, but would struggle on the road, getting only 7 victories. On December 9, 1941, the Chicago Blackhawks-Boston Bruins game would be delayed for over a half-hour as United States President Franklin Delano Roosevelt declared that America was at war.

Bill Thoms would set a team record by finishing the year with 45 points, which was the 6th highest point total in the league, and his 30 assists also broke a Black Hawks record. Red Hamill would score a team high 18 goals in only 34 games with Chicago, as he came to the Hawks in a mid-season trade with the Boston Bruins. Along with his 6 goals in Boston, his 24 goals would be tied for the 2nd most in the NHL. Earl Seibert would once again lead the defense, earning 21 points, while Joe Cooper would finish just behind him with 20 points. John Mariucci led the Black Hawks with 61 penalty minutes.

In goal, Sam LoPresti would appear in 47 games, winning 21 of them and earning 3 shutouts. Bill Dickie would replace LoPresti in a game due to an injury, and he would record the victory.

Chicago would qualify for post-season play for the 3rd straight season, and face a 1st round matchup against the 3rd seeded Boston Bruins in a best of 3 series. The Hawks would drop the opening game in overtime at Chicago Stadium, then would play the next 2 games on the road at the Boston Garden. The Hawks would surprise the Bruins in game 2, with a convincing 4–0 victory, however, Chicago could not repeat their success in game 3, as Boston would hold off the Hawks 3–2 and win the series.

== Season standings ==
National Hockey League
	GP	W	L	T	Pts	GF	GA
**New York Rangers**	48	29	17	2	60	177	143
**Toronto Maple Leafs**	48	27	18	3	57	158	136
**Boston Bruins**	48	25	17	6	56	160	118
**Chicago Black Hawks**	48	22	23	3	47	145	155
**Detroit Red Wings**	48	19	25	4	42	140	147
**Montreal Canadiens**	48	18	27	3	39	134	173
Brooklyn Americans	48	16	29	3	35	133	175

Note: GP = Games played, W = Wins, L = Losses, T = Ties, Pts = Points, GF = Goals for, GA = Goals against
Teams that qualified for the playoffs are highlighted in bold.

=== Record vs. opponents ===
1941–42 NHL Records
Team	BOS	BRK	CHI	DET	MTL	NYR	TOR
Boston	—	4–4	3–3–2	4–2–2	6–1–1	4–4	4–3–1
Brooklyn	4–4	—	2–6	3–4–1	3–4–1	2–5–1	2–6
Chicago	3–3–2	6–2	—	3–5	4–3–1	2–6	4–4
Detroit	2–4–2	4–3–1	5–3	—	5–3	1–7	2–5–1
Montreal	1–6–1	4–3–1	3–4–1	3–5	—	4–4	3–5
New York	4–4	5–2–1	6–2	7–1	4–4	—	3–4–1
Toronto	3–4–1	6–2	4–4	5–2–1	5–3	4–3–1	—

== Schedule and results ==
1941–42 regular season
November

Game	Date	Visitor	Score	Home	Record	Points
1	November 6	Brooklyn Americans	0–1	Chicago Black Hawks	1–0–0	2
2	November 8	Chicago Black Hawks	2–2	Montreal Canadiens	1–0–1	3
3	November 13	Chicago Black Hawks	2–1	Brooklyn Americans	2–0–1	5
4	November 16	Detroit Red Wings	2–3	Chicago Black Hawks	3–0–1	7
5	November 20	Boston Bruins	2–3	Chicago Black Hawks	4–0–1	9
6	November 22	Chicago Black Hawks	0–3	Toronto Maple Leafs	4–1–1	9
7	November 23	Toronto Maple Leafs	2–3	Chicago Black Hawks	5–1–1	11
8	November 25	Chicago Black Hawks	4–5	New York Rangers	5–2–1	11
9	November 27	Chicago Black Hawks	1–4	Detroit Red Wings	5–3–1	11
10	November 30	New York Rangers	5–1	Chicago Black Hawks	5–4–1	11

December

Game	Date	Visitor	Score	Home	Record	Points
11	December 4	Montreal Canadiens	2–9	Chicago Black Hawks	6–4–1	13
12	December 7	Brooklyn Americans	4–5	Chicago Black Hawks	7–4–1	15
13	December 9	Chicago Black Hawks	2–2	Boston Bruins	7–4–2	16
14	December 14	Boston Bruins	3–3	Chicago Black Hawks	7–4–3	17
15	December 18	New York Rangers	1–5	Chicago Black Hawks	8–4–3	19
16	December 20	Chicago Black Hawks	2–0	Toronto Maple Leafs	9–4–3	21
17	December 21	Toronto Maple Leafs	3–0	Chicago Black Hawks	9–5–3	21
18	December 23	Chicago Black Hawks	3–4	Brooklyn Americans	9–6–3	21
19	December 25	Chicago Black Hawks	2–5	New York Rangers	9–7–3	21
20	December 30	Chicago Black Hawks	3–5	Montreal Canadiens	9–8–3	21

January

Game	Date	Visitor	Score	Home	Record	Points
21	January 1	Detroit Red Wings	3–0	Chicago Black Hawks	9–9–3	21
22	January 6	Chicago Black Hawks	2–3	Boston Bruins	9–10–3	21
23	January 8	Montreal Canadiens	1–5	Chicago Black Hawks	10–10–3	23
24	January 11	Detroit Red Wings	5–6	Chicago Black Hawks	11–10–3	25
25	January 15	Chicago Black Hawks	7–4	Brooklyn Americans	12–10–3	27
26	January 17	Chicago Black Hawks	4–2	Toronto Maple Leafs	13–10–3	29
27	January 18	Boston Bruins	4–3	Chicago Black Hawks	13–11–3	29
28	January 22	Brooklyn Americans	2–4	Chicago Black Hawks	14–11–3	31
29	January 25	Toronto Maple Leafs	4–6	Chicago Black Hawks	15–11–3	33
30	January 29	Chicago Black Hawks	0–2	Detroit Red Wings	15–12–3	33

February

Game	Date	Visitor	Score	Home	Record	Points
31	February 1	Montreal Canadiens	3–2	Chicago Black Hawks	15–13–3	33
32	February 3	Chicago Black Hawks	5–3	Boston Bruins	16–13–3	35
33	February 5	Chicago Black Hawks	4–3	Montreal Canadiens	17–13–3	37
34	February 8	New York Rangers	4–3	Chicago Black Hawks	17–14–3	37
35	February 10	Chicago Black Hawks	5–2	New York Rangers	18–14–3	39
36	February 12	Detroit Red Wings	2–4	Chicago Black Hawks	19–14–3	41
37	February 15	Boston Bruins	0–2	Chicago Black Hawks	20–14–3	43
38	February 19	Chicago Black Hawks	1–6	Detroit Red Wings	20–15–3	43
39	February 21	Chicago Black Hawks	3–5	Montreal Canadiens	20–16–3	43
40	February 22	Chicago Black Hawks	2–3	New York Rangers	20–17–3	43
41	February 26	Montreal Canadiens	4–5	Chicago Black Hawks	21–17–3	45
42	February 28	Chicago Black Hawks	2–8	Toronto Maple Leafs	21–18–3	45

March

Game	Date	Visitor	Score	Home	Record	Points
43	March 1	Toronto Maple Leafs	4–3	Chicago Black Hawks	21–19–3	45
44	March 5	Chicago Black Hawks	1–2	Brooklyn Americans	21–20–3	45
45	March 8	Brooklyn Americans	1–6	Chicago Black Hawks	22–20–3	47
46	March 10	Chicago Black Hawks	1–9	Boston Bruins	22–21–3	47
47	March 15	New York Rangers	5–1	Chicago Black Hawks	22–22–3	47
48	March 19	Chicago Black Hawks	4–6	Detroit Red Wings	22–23–3	47

Legend: Win (2 points) Loss (0 points) Tie (1 point)

== Playoffs ==
=== Bruins 2, Black Hawks 1 ===
==== NHL quarter-finals ====
===== (3) Boston Bruins vs. (4) Chicago Black Hawks =====
March 22	Boston Bruins	2 – 1	OT	Chicago Black Hawks	Chicago Stadium	Recap
Conacher (1) – (Cowley, Wiseman) – 11:08		First period		No scoring
No scoring		Second period		No scoring
No scoring		Third period		18:50 – M. Bentley (1) – (D. Bentley, March)
Smith (1) – (Conacher, Cowley) – 6:51		First overtime period		No scoring
Brimsek (1-0)		Goalie stats		LoPresti (0-1)

March 24	Chicago Black Hawks	4 – 0	Boston Bruins	Boston Garden	Recap
No scoring		First period	No scoring
Mosienko (1) – (Hamill, Carse) – 3:57; Kaleta (1) – (Thoms, Allen) – 10:19; Carse (1) – (Kaleta) – 10:30		Second period	No scoring
Allen (1) – (Kaleta, Carse) – 6:27		Third period	No scoring
LoPresti (1-1)		Goalie stats	Brimsek (1-1)

March 26	Chicago Black Hawks	2 – 3	Boston Bruins	Boston Garden	Recap
No scoring		First period	18:01 – Bruce (1) – (McGill, Shewchuk)
M. Bentley (2) – (March, Cooper) – 7:09; Mosienko (2) – pp – (Carse, Cooper) – 15:26		Second period	0:48 – Bruce (2) – (Hiller, Crawford); 8:15 – McGill (2) – (Unassisted)
No scoring		Third period	No scoring
LoPresti (1-2)		Goalie stats	Brimsek (2-1)

Boston wins series 2 – 1

== Season stats ==
=== Scoring leaders ===
Player	GP	G	A	Pts	PIM
Bill Thoms	47	15	30	45	8
Mush March	46	6	26	32	22
Max Bentley	38	13	17	30	2
Alex Kaleta	47	7	21	28	24
Red Hamill	34	18	9	27	21

=== Goaltending ===
Player	GP	TOI	W	L	T	GA	SO	GAA
Bill Dickie	1	60	1	0	0	3	0	3.00
Sam LoPresti	47	2860	21	23	3	152	3	3.19

== Playoff stats ==
=== Scoring leaders ===
Player	GP	G	A	Pts	PIM
Alex Kaleta	3	1	2	3	0
Bill Mosienko	3	2	0	2	0
Max Bentley	3	2	0	2	0
Bill Carse	3	1	1	2	0
George Allen	3	1	1	2	0

=== Goaltending ===
Player	GP	TOI	W	L	GA	SO	GAA
Sam LoPresti	3	187	1	2	5	1	1.60
