= 1942 in sports =

Note — many sporting events did not take place because of World War II

1942 in sports describes the year's events in world sport.

== American football ==
- NFL Championship: the Washington Redskins won 14–6 over the Chicago Bears at Griffith Stadium
- 1 January – The Rose Bowl not being available for war-related reasons, the Oregon State Beavers play the Duke Blue Devils for that championship at the latter's venue of Durham, North Carolina, beating the Blue Devils, 20–16.
- Ohio State Buckeyes – college football national championship (coached by Paul Brown)

== Association football ==
- FIFA World Cup – not held due to World War II.
- La Liga is won by Valencia CF.
- German football championship won by Schalke 04
- Serie A won by A.S. Roma
- Primeira Liga won by S.L. Benfica
- Japan defeat Republic Of China, Manchukuo, Mongolia, by 6–1, 3–0, 12–0 during 8–20 August 1942 to win Manchuria 10th Anniversary Tournament.
- There is no major football competition in England, Scotland or France due to World War II. In England, several regional leagues are played but statistics from these are not counted in players’ figures.

== Australian rules football ==
- Victorian Football League – Essendon wins the 46th VFL Premiership, beating Richmond 19.18 (132) to 11.13 (79) in the 1942 VFL Grand Final.

== Baseball ==
- January 4 – Hall of Fame election: Rogers Hornsby is elected to the Baseball Hall of Fame, getting 78 percent of the vote. Further selections of 19th-century players are delayed.
- January 15 – President Franklin D. Roosevelt gives baseball the go-ahead to play despite World War II. FDR encourages more night baseball so that war workers may attend. The Cubs, who had signed contracts to install lights at Wrigley Field, drop their plans because of the military need for the material. There will be no lights at Wrigley for 46 more years.
- World Series – St. Louis Cardinals (NL) defeat New York Yankees (AL), 4 games to 1.
- Negro League World Series – Kansas City Monarchs (NAL) defeat Homestead Grays (NNL), 4 games to none.
- The Winnipeg Maroons win the Northern League championship. It would also be their last.
- Leones Caracas, as most successful professional baseball club in Venezuela, officially founded on May 7.

== Basketball ==
NBL Championship

- Oshkosh All-Stars over Fort Wayne Zollner Pistons (2–1)

Events

- The tenth South American Basketball Championship in Santiago is won by Argentina.

== Cricket ==
Events

- There is no first-class cricket in England or Australia due to World War II. A few first-class matches are played in the West Indies, South Africa and New Zealand but are not part of any official competition.
- Former England international Andy Ducat dies of a heart attack on 23 July during a game at Lord's Cricket Ground whilst playing for his unit of the Home Guard from Surrey against another from Sussex.

India

- Ranji Trophy – Bombay beat Mysore by an innings and 281 runs.
- Bombay Pentangular – not contested

West Indies

- Trinidad are dismissed for just 16 against Barbados during a game at the Bridgetown Oval – still the lowest team innings total in West Indian first-class cricket history.

== Cycling ==
Tour de France

- not contested due to World War II

Giro d'Italia

- not contested due to World War II

== Figure skating ==
World Figure Skating Championships

- not contested due to World War II

== Golf ==
Men's professional

- Masters Tournament – Byron Nelson
- U.S. Open – not played due to World War II
- British Open – not played due to World War II
- PGA Championship – Sam Snead

Men's amateur

- British Amateur – not played due to World War II
- U.S. Amateur – not played due to World War II

Women's professional

- Women's Western Open – Betty Jameson
- Titleholders Championship – Dorothy Kirby

== Horse racing ==
Steeplechases

- Cheltenham Gold Cup – Medoc II
- Grand National – not held due to World War II

Hurdle races

- Champion Hurdle – Forestation

Flat races

- Australia – Melbourne Cup won by Colonus^{[a]}
- Canada – King's Plate won by Ten To Ace
- France – Prix de l'Arc de Triomphe won by Djebel
- Ireland – Irish Derby Stakes won by Windsor Slipper
- English Triple Crown Races:
  1. 2,000 Guineas Stakes – Big Game
  2. The Derby – Watling Street
  3. St. Leger Stakes – Sun Chariot
- United States Triple Crown Races:
  1. Kentucky Derby – Shut Out
  2. Preakness Stakes – Alsab
  3. Belmont Stakes – Shut Out

== Ice hockey ==
- National Hockey League
  - Stanley Cup – Toronto Maple Leafs won 4 games to 3 over the Detroit Red Wings
    - The Leafs won the series after losing the first three games, a feat that has only happened twice since then in North American professional sports.
  - NHL scoring leader – Bryan Hextall, New York Rangers
  - Hart Memorial Trophy for the NHL's Most Valuable Player – Tom Anderson, Brooklyn Americans

== Motor racing ==
Events

- No major races are held anywhere worldwide due to World War II

== Rowing ==
The Boat Race

- Oxford and Cambridge Boat Race is not contested due to World War II

== Rugby league ==
- 1942 New Zealand rugby league season
- 1942 NSWRFL season
- 1941–42 Northern Rugby Football League Wartime Emergency League season / 1942–43 Northern Rugby Football League Wartime Emergency League season

== Rugby union ==
- Five Nations Championship series is not contested due to World War II

== Speed skating ==
Speed Skating World Championships

- not contested due to World War II

== Tennis ==
Australia

- Australian Men's Singles Championship – not contested
- Australian Women's Singles Championship – not contested

England

- Wimbledon Men's Singles Championship – not contested
- Wimbledon Women's Singles Championship – not contested

France

- French Men's Singles Championship – Bernard Destremau (France) defeats Christian Boussus (France) — 5–7, 6–4, 6–4, 6–1
- French Women's Singles Championship – Alice Weiwers (Luxembourg) defeats Lolette Dodille-Payot (Switzerland) — 6–4, 6–4

USA

- American Men's Singles Championship – Ted Schroeder (USA) defeats Frank Parker (USA) 8–6, 7–5, 3–6, 4–6, 6–2
- American Women's Singles Championship – Pauline Betz Addie (USA) defeats Louise Brough Clapp (USA) 4–6, 6–1, 6–4

Davis Cup

- 1942 International Lawn Tennis Challenge – not contested

== Awards ==
- Associated Press Male Athlete of the Year: Frank Sinkwich, College football
- Associated Press Female Athlete of the Year: Gloria Callen, Swimming

== Notes ==
^{a} Owing to government bans on weekday sport, the Melbourne Cup was run on a Saturday from 1942 to 1944.
