= Tudin (surname) =

Tudin is a surname. Notable people with the surname include:

- Connie Tudin (1917–1988), Canadian ice hockey player
- Dan Tudin (born 1978), Italian ice hockey player
