= Pete Morin =

Canadian ice hockey player

- Born: December 8, 1915 Lachine, Quebec, Canada
- Died: January 5, 2000 (aged 84)
- Height: 5 ft 6 in (168 cm)
- Weight: 150 lb (68 kg; 10 st 10 lb)
- Position: Left wing
- Shot: Left
- Played for: Montreal Canadiens; Français Volants
- Playing career: 1934–1950

Joseph Pierre Marius "Pete, Pit" Morin (December 8, 1915 – January 5, 2000) was a Canadian ice hockey forward. He played 32 games in the National Hockey League with the Montreal Canadiens during the 1941–42 season. The rest of his career, which lasted from 1934 to 1950, was mainly spent with the Montreal Royals in the Quebec Senior Hockey League.

== Playing career ==
Morin was born and raised in the Montreal suburb of Lachine and began playing for the Montreal Royals of the QSHL in 1936. There, he skated alongside Buddy O'Connor and Gerry Heffernan and the trio became known as the "Razzle Dazzle" line. In 1941–42 the three played together for the Canadiens. In 31 games he recorded 10 goals and 12 assists for 22 points and appeared as a promising forward. Yet an injury cut his NHL career short and he returned to the less competitive QSHL where he continued to put up productive numbers. He was also a member of the Montreal Royal Canadian Air Force team for two years during World War II.

== Career statistics ==
=== Regular season and playoffs ===
			Regular season					Playoffs
Season	Team	League	GP	G	A	Pts	PIM	GP	G	A	Pts	PIM
1934–35	Français Volants	FRA	—	—	—	—	—	—	—	—	—	—
1934–35	Montreal Victorias	MMJHL	1	1	0	1	6	—	—	—	—	—
1945–36	Montreal Victorias	MMJHL	—	—	—	—	—	—	—	—	—	—
1936–37	Montreal Royals	MTL Sr	21	17	5	22	15	5	3	1	4	4
1937–38	Montreal Royals	MCHL	22	4	4	8	14	1	0	0	0	0
1938–39	Montreal Royals	MCHL	17	7	12	19	16	5	4	5	9	0
1938–39	Montreal Royals	Al-Cup	—	—	—	—	—	15	17	8	25	6
1939–40	Montreal Royals	QSHL	29	14	20	34	4	8	3	7	10	5
1939–40	Montreal Royals	Al-Cup	—	—	—	—	—	5	2	3	5	2
1940–41	Montreal Royals	QSHL	35	17	19	36	17	8	6	2	8	4
1940–41	Montreal Royals	Al-Cup	—	—	—	—	—	14	11	5	16	29
1941–42	Montreal Canadiens	NHL	32	10	12	22	7	1	0	0	0	0
1941–42	Montreal Royals	QSHL	11	3	1	4	4	—	—	—	—	—
1942–43	Montreal RCAF	QSHL	35	15	21	36	4	12	3	6	9	4
1943–44	Montreal RCAF	QSHL	7	1	1	2	2	—	—	—	—	—
1944–45	Lachine Rapides	QPHL	—	—	—	—	—	—	—	—	—	—
1945–46	Montreal Royals	QSHL	39	33	28	61	17	11	2	12	14	2
1946–47	Montreal Royals	QSHL	31	18	32	50	10	11	1	15	16	2
1946–47	Montreal Royals	Al-Cup	—	—	—	—	—	14	3	15	18	2
1947–48	Montreal Royals	QSHL	47	34	57	91	6	3	1	1	2	2
1948–49	Montreal Royals	QSHL	53	25	54	79	20	8	6	6	12	2
1949–50	Montreal Royals	QSHL	52	25	29	54	13	6	0	3	3	0
QSHL totals			339	185	262	447	97	67	22	52	74	21
NHL totals			32	10	12	22	7	1	0	0	0	0
