= 1941–42 Detroit Red Wings season =

Sports season

1941–42 Detroit Red Wings
- League: 5th NHL
- 1941–42 record: 19–25–4
- Home record: 14–7–3
- Road record: 5–18–1
- Goals for: 140
- Goals against: 147

Team information
- General manager: Jack Adams
- Coach: Jack Adams
- Captain: Ebbie Goodfellow
- Arena: Detroit Olympia

Team leaders
- Goals: Don Grosso (23)
- Assists: Sid Abel (31)
- Points: Don Grosso (53)
- Penalty minutes: Jimmy Orlando (111)
- Wins: Johnny Mowers (19)
- Goals against average: Joe Turner (2.57)

The 1941–42 Detroit Red Wings season was the 16th season for the Detroit NHL franchise, tenth as the Red Wings. This season became, and still remains, infamous as the Red Wings lost the 1942 Stanley Cup Final to the Toronto Maple Leafs in seven games despite winning the first three of the series, which gave them the dubious distinction of not only becoming the first National Hockey League team to surrender a 3-0 lead in a series, but also becoming the first North American sports team in history to do so.

== Regular season ==
=== Final standings ===
National Hockey League
	GP	W	L	T	Pts	GF	GA
**New York Rangers**	48	29	17	2	60	177	143
**Toronto Maple Leafs**	48	27	18	3	57	158	136
**Boston Bruins**	48	25	17	6	56	160	118
**Chicago Black Hawks**	48	22	23	3	47	145	155
**Detroit Red Wings**	48	19	25	4	42	140	147
**Montreal Canadiens**	48	18	27	3	39	134	173
Brooklyn Americans	48	16	29	3	35	133	175

Note: GP = Games played, W = Wins, L = Losses, T = Ties, Pts = Points, GF = Goals for, GA = Goals against
Teams that qualified for the playoffs are highlighted in bold.

=== Record vs. opponents ===
1941–42 NHL Records
Team	BOS	BRK	CHI	DET	MTL	NYR	TOR
Boston	—	4–4	3–3–2	4–2–2	6–1–1	4–4	4–3–1
Brooklyn	4–4	—	2–6	3–4–1	3–4–1	2–5–1	2–6
Chicago	3–3–2	6–2	—	3–5	4–3–1	2–6	4–4
Detroit	2–4–2	4–3–1	5–3	—	5–3	1–7	2–5–1
Montreal	1–6–1	4–3–1	3–4–1	3–5	—	4–4	3–5
New York	4–4	5–2–1	6–2	7–1	4–4	—	3–4–1
Toronto	3–4–1	6–2	4–4	5–2–1	5–3	4–3–1	—

== Schedule and results ==
1941–42 regular season
November

Game	Result	Date	Score	Opponent	Record
1	W	November 1, 1941	3–2	@ Montreal Canadiens (1941–42)	1–0–0
2	T	November 2, 1941	3–3 OT	Brooklyn Americans (1941–42)	1–0–1
3	L	November 9, 1941	1–3	New York Rangers (1941–42)	1–1–1
4	L	November 15, 1941	1–2	@ Toronto Maple Leafs (1941–42)	1–2–1
5	L	November 16, 1941	2–3	@ Chicago Black Hawks (1941–42)	1–3–1
6	L	November 20, 1941	3–4 OT	Toronto Maple Leafs (1941–42)	1–4–1
7	W	November 22, 1941	2–1	@ Brooklyn Americans (1941–42)	2–4–1
8	L	November 23, 1941	2–4	Boston Bruins (1941–42)	2–5–1
9	L	November 25, 1941	1–7	@ Boston Bruins (1941–42)	2–6–1
10	W	November 27, 1941	4–1	Chicago Black Hawks (1941–42)	3–6–1
11	L	November 29, 1941	1–4	@ New York Rangers (1941–42)	3–7–1

December

Game	Result	Date	Score	Opponent	Record
12	W	December 4, 1941	4–3	Brooklyn Americans (1941–42)	4–7–1
13	W	December 7, 1941	3–2	Montreal Canadiens (1941–42)	5–7–1
14	L	December 14, 1941	0–4	Toronto Maple Leafs (1941–42)	5–8–1
15	L	December 18, 1941	3–4 OT	@ Brooklyn Americans (1941–42)	5–9–1
16	T	December 21, 1941	2–2 OT	Boston Bruins (1941–42)	5–9–2
17	W	December 25, 1941	3–2 OT	Brooklyn Americans (1941–42)	6–9–2
18	L	December 27, 1941	3–5	@ Toronto Maple Leafs (1941–42)	6–10–2
19	L	December 28, 1941	1–3	New York Rangers (1941–42)	6–11–2

January

Game	Result	Date	Score	Opponent	Record
20	W	January 1, 1942	3–0	@ Chicago Black Hawks (1941–42)	7–11–2
21	L	January 3, 1942	1–4	@ Montreal Canadiens (1941–42)	7–12–2
22	W	January 4, 1942	10–0	Montreal Canadiens (1941–42)	8–12–2
23	L	January 6, 1942	2–3	@ New York Rangers (1941–42)	8–13–2
24	L	January 9, 1942	4–5	@ Brooklyn Americans (1941–42)	8–14–2
25	W	January 10, 1942	6–4	@ Toronto Maple Leafs (1941–42)	9–14–2
26	L	January 11, 1942	5–6	@ Chicago Black Hawks (1941–42)	9–15–2
27	L	January 13, 1942	1–2	@ Boston Bruins (1941–42)	9–16–2
28	L	January 18, 1942	3–5	Brooklyn Americans (1941–42)	9–17–2
29	W	January 22, 1942	4–3	Boston Bruins (1941–42)	10–17–2
30	L	January 24, 1942	2–3	New York Rangers (1941–42)	10–18–2
31	L	January 25, 1942	2–11	@ New York Rangers (1941–42)	10–19–2
32	W	January 29, 1942	2–0	Chicago Black Hawks (1941–42)	11–19–2

February

Game	Result	Date	Score	Opponent	Record
33	T	February 5, 1942	3–3 OT	Toronto Maple Leafs (1941–42)	11–19–3
34	L	February 7, 1942	1–3	@ Montreal Canadiens (1941–42)	11–20–3
35	L	February 8, 1942	0–3	@ Boston Bruins (1941–42)	11–21–3
36	L	February 12, 1942	2–4	@ Chicago Black Hawks (1941–42)	11–22–3
37	L	February 14, 1942	2–4	@ Toronto Maple Leafs (1941–42)	11–23–3
38	W	February 15, 1942	5–0	Montreal Canadiens (1941–42)	12–23–3
39	W	February 19, 1942	6–1	Chicago Black Hawks (1941–42)	13–23–3
40	W	February 22, 1942	3–0	Toronto Maple Leafs (1941–42)	14–23–3
41	W	February 24, 1942	3–2	@ Brooklyn Americans (1941–42)	15–23–3
42	L	February 26, 1942	4–7	@ New York Rangers (1941–42)	15–24–3

March

Game	Result	Date	Score	Opponent	Record
43	T	March 1, 1942	3–3 OT	@ Boston Bruins (1941–42)	15–24–4
44	W	March 5, 1942	5–2	New York Rangers (1941–42)	16–24–4
45	W	March 8, 1942	3–1	Boston Bruins (1941–42)	17–24–4
46	L	March 14, 1942	3–4	@ Montreal Canadiens (1941–42)	17–25–4
47	W	March 15, 1942	4–1	Montreal Canadiens (1941–42)	18–25–4
48	W	March 19, 1942	6–4	Chicago Black Hawks (1941–42)	19–25–4

Legend: Win (2 points) Loss (0 points) Tie (1 point)

== Playoffs ==
=== (5) Detroit Red Wings vs. (6) Montreal Canadiens ===
Montreal Canadiens vs Detroit Red Wings
Date	Visitors	Score	Home	Score
Mar 22	Montreal C.	1	Detroit	2
Mar 24	Detroit	0	Montreal C.	5
Mar 26	Montreal C.	2	Detroit	6

Detroit wins best-of-three series 2–1.

=== (3) Boston Bruins vs. (5) Detroit Red Wings ===
Detroit Red Wings vs Boston Bruins
Date	Visitors	Score	Home	Score
Mar 29	Detroit	6	Boston	4
Mar 31	Boston	1	Detroit	3

Detroit wins best-of-three series 2–0.

=== (2) Toronto Maple Leafs vs. (5) Detroit Red Wings ===
Detroit Red Wings vs Toronto Maple Leafs
Date	Visitors	Score	Home	Score
Apr 4	Detroit	3	Toronto	2
Apr 7	Detroit	4	Toronto	2
Apr 9	Toronto	2	Detroit	5
Apr 12	Toronto	4	Detroit	3
Apr 14	Detroit	3	Toronto	9
Apr 16	Toronto	3	Detroit	0
Apr 18	Detroit	1	Toronto	3

Toronto wins the Stanley Cup 4–3.

== Player statistics ==
=== Regular season ===
Scoring

Player	Pos	GP	G	A	Pts	PIM
Don Grosso	LW/C	48	23	30	53	13
Sid Abel	C/LW	48	18	31	49	45
Eddie Wares	D/RW	43	9	29	38	31
Syd Howe	C/LW	48	16	19	35	6
Mud Bruneteau	RW	48	14	19	33	8
Carl Liscombe	LW	47	13	17	30	14
Gus Giesebrecht	C	34	6	16	22	2
Joe Carveth	RW	29	6	11	17	2
Adam Brown	LW	28	6	9	15	15
Ken Kilrea	LW	21	3	12	15	4
Pat McReavy	C	34	5	8	13	0
Jack Stewart	D	44	4	7	11	93
Eddie Bush	D	18	4	6	10	40
Gerry Brown	LW	13	4	4	8	0
Jimmy Orlando	D	48	1	7	8	111
Alex Motter	C	19	2	4	6	20
Ebbie Goodfellow	C/D	9	2	2	4	2
Bill Jennings	RW	16	2	1	3	6
Buck Jones	D	21	2	1	3	8
Connie Brown	C	9	0	3	3	4
Doug McCaig	D	9	0	1	1	6
Johnny Mowers	G	47	0	1	1	0
Joe Fisher	RW	3	0	0	0	0
Dutch Hiller	LW	7	0	0	0	0
Joe Turner	G	1	0	0	0	0
Bob Whitelaw	D	9	0	0	0	0

Goaltending

Player	MIN	GP	W	L	T	GA	GAA	SO
Johnny Mowers	2880	47	19	25	3	144	3.00	5
Joe Turner	70	1	0	0	1	3	2.57	0
Team:	2950	48	19	25	4	147	2.99	5

=== Playoffs ===
Scoring

Player	Pos	GP	G	A	Pts	PIM
Don Grosso	LW/C	12	8	6	14	29
Carl Liscombe	LW	12	6	6	12	2
Syd Howe	C/LW	12	3	5	8	0
Eddie Bush	D	11	1	6	7	23
Mud Bruneteau	RW	12	5	1	6	6
Sid Abel	C/LW	12	4	2	6	8
Joe Carveth	RW	9	4	0	4	0
Alex Motter	C	12	1	3	4	20
Eddie Wares	D/RW	12	1	3	4	22
Jimmy Orlando	D	12	0	4	4	45
Gerry Brown	LW	12	2	1	3	4
Pat McReavy	C	11	1	1	2	4
Adam Brown	LW	10	0	2	2	4
Jack Stewart	D	12	0	1	1	12
Joe Fisher	RW	1	0	0	0	0
Gus Giesebrecht	C	2	0	0	0	0
Doug McCaig	D	2	0	0	0	6
Johnny Mowers	G	12	0	0	0	0

Goaltending

Player	MIN	GP	W	L	GA	GAA	SO
Johnny Mowers	720	12	7	5	38	3.17	0
Team:	720	12	7	5	38	3.17	0

Note: GP = Games played; G = Goals; A = Assists; Pts = Points; +/- = Plus-minus PIM = Penalty minutes; PPG = Power-play goals; SHG = Short-handed goals; GWG = Game-winning goals;
MIN = Minutes played; W = Wins; L = Losses; T = Ties; GA = Goals against; GAA = Goals-against average; SO = Shutouts;

== See also ==
- 1941–42 NHL season
