= Hank D'Amore =

Canadian ice hockey player

- Born: July 17, 1919; Niagara Falls, Ontario, Canada
- Died: May 12, 1994 (aged 74)
- Height: 5 ft 6 in (168 cm)
- Weight: 200 lb (91 kg; 14 st 4 lb)
- Position: Centre
- Shot: Left
- Played for: New York Rangers
- Playing career: 1938–1948

Henry John D'Amore (July 17, 1919 – May 12, 1994) was a Canadian ice hockey centre. He played 4 games in the National Hockey League with the New York Rangers during the 1943–44 season. The rest of his career, which lasted from 1938 to 1948, was spent in the minor leagues. He was born in Niagara Falls, Ontario, and his brother, Nick Damore, also played in the NHL.

== Career statistics ==
=== Regular season and playoffs ===
| | | | Regular season | | | | | Playoffs |
| Season | Team | League | GP | G | A | Pts | PIM | GP | G | A | Pts | PIM |
|---|---|---|---|---|---|---|---|---|---|---|---|---|
| 1935–36 | Niagara Falls Cataracts | OHA | 8 | 4 | 3 | 7 | 10 | 2 | 2 | 0 | 2 | 0 |
| 1936–37 | Stratford Midgets | OHA | 13 | 19 | 7 | 26 | 30 | 2 | 3 | 2 | 5 | 17 |
| 1937–38 | Stratford Midgets | OHA | 14 | 13 | 17 | 30 | 43 | 7 | 5 | 1 | 6 | 12 |
| 1938–39 | Verdun Maple Leafs | QSHL | 14 | 3 | 4 | 7 | 26 | — | — | — | — | — |
| 1938–39 | Stratford Majors | OHA Sr | 10 | 0 | 3 | 3 | 16 | 2 | 0 | 1 | 1 | 2 |
| 1939–40 | Stratford Canadians | MOHL | 38 | 18 | 16 | 34 | 40 | 4 | 3 | 3 | 6 | 10 |
| 1940–41 | Toronto People's Credit | TIHL | 9 | 3 | 4 | 7 | 28 | 3 | 0 | 2 | 2 | 0 |
| 1940–41 | London Mohawks | OHA Sr | 18 | 3 | 5 | 8 | 28 | — | — | — | — | — |
| 1941–42 | Toronto People's Credit | TIHL | 3 | 0 | 0 | 0 | 4 | — | — | — | — | — |
| 1941–42 | Detroit Mansfields | MOHL | 17 | 11 | 26 | 37 | 8 | — | — | — | — | — |
| 1941–42 | Toledo Babcocks | MOHL | — | — | — | — | — | 7 | 5 | 6 | 11 | 28 |
| 1942–43 | Windsor Colonial Tools | MOHL | 15 | 17 | 30 | 47 | 38 | 7 | 16 | 10 | 26 | 14 |
| 1943–44 | New York Rangers | NHL | 4 | 1 | 0 | 1 | 2 | — | — | — | — | — |
| 1943–44 | New Haven Eagles | AHL | 12 | 6 | 16 | 22 | 12 | — | — | — | — | — |
| 1943–44 | Brooklyn Cresecents | EAHL | 28 | 34 | 29 | 63 | 26 | 11 | 8 | 12 | 20 | 6 |
| 1944–45 | Washington Lions | EAHL | 1 | 1 | 0 | 1 | 0 | — | — | — | — | — |
| 1944–45 | Hershey Bears | AHL | 1 | 0 | 0 | 0 | 0 | — | — | — | — | — |
| 1944–45 | New York Rovers | EAHL | 39 | 19 | 41 | 60 | 40 | 12 | 8 | 9 | 17 | 14 |
| 1944–45 | Baltimore Blades | EAHL | — | — | — | — | — | 1 | 0 | 0 | 0 | 0 |
| 1945–46 | Philadelphia Falcons | EAHL | 50 | 13 | 38 | 51 | 28 | 12 | 4 | 7 | 11 | 4 |
| 1946–47 | Fresno Falcons | PCHL | 59 | 25 | 55 | 80 | 30 | 2 | 0 | 2 | 2 | 0 |
| 1947–48 | Los Angeles Monarchs | PCHL | 43 | 12 | 23 | 35 | 30 | — | — | — | — | — |
| EAHL totals | | | 130 | 73 | 124 | 197 | 106 | 36 | 20 | 28 | 48 | 24 |
| NHL totals | | | 4 | 1 | 0 | 1 | 2 | — | — | — | — | — |
