= Lloyd Gronsdahl =

Canadian ice hockey player

- Born: May 10, 1921 Norquay, Saskatchewan, Canada
- Died: December 15, 1989 (aged 68)
- Height: 5 ft 9 in (175 cm)
- Weight: 170 lb (77 kg; 12 st 2 lb)
- Position: Right wing
- Shot: Right
- Played for: Boston Bruins
- Playing career: 1941–1951

Lloyd Gifford Gronsdahl (May 10, 1921 in Norquay, Saskatchewan — December 15, 1989) was a professional ice hockey player who played ten games in the National Hockey League with the Boston Bruins during the 1941–42 season. The rest of his career, which lasted from 1941 to 1951, was spent in various minor leagues.

Gronsdahl scored one NHL goal. It came on March 3, 1942 in Boston's 5-3 win over Toronto at Boston Garden.

Gronsdahl enlisted in the Royal Canadian Air Force serving in Canada and also overseas at Leeming Yorkshire where RCAF 427 Lion and 429 Bison Heavy Bomber squadrons were stationed. He attained the rank of Leading AircraftsMan. Boston Bruin Gronsdahl and fellow NHL player Alf Pike ( NY Rangers) played hockey with the Station's undefeated "Millward's Pucksters".

== Career statistics ==
=== Regular season and playoffs ===
			Regular season					Playoffs
Season	Team	League	GP	G	A	Pts	PIM	GP	G	A	Pts	PIM
1940–41	Regina Capitals	S-SSHL	16	7	11	18	6	4	4	3	7	2
1941–42	Boston Bruins	NHL	10	1	2	3	0	—	—	—	—	—
1941–42	Boston Olympics	EAHL	43	29	14	43	11	1	0	1	1	0
1942–43	Toronto RCAF	OHA Sr	5	6	0	6	10	9	13	3	16	4
1942–43	Toronto RCAF	Al-Cup	—	—	—	—	—	7	6	1	7	6
1943–44	Toronto RCAF	OHA Sr	15	7	3	10	6	—	—	—	—	—
1943–44	Toronto Orphans	TMHL	8	5	6	11	4	13	13	13	26	4
1944–45	Toronto RCAF	TNDHL	2	1	3	4	0	—	—	—	—	—
1944–45	Toronto Orphans	TMHL	3	2	3	5	6	—	—	—	—	—
1945–46	Millward-George RCAF	GBR	—	—	—	—	—	—	—	—	—	—
1946–47	Hershey Bears	AHL	64	19	21	40	17	11	1	2	3	4
1947–48	Hershey Bears	AHL	66	11	11	22	7	2	1	0	1	2
1948–49	Tulsa Oilers	USHL	63	38	25	63	17	7	3	3	6	2
1949–50	Tulsa Oilers	USHL	60	20	23	43	21	—	—	—	—	—
1950–51	Tulsa Oilers	USHL	61	23	23	46	8	9	1	2	3	6
NHL totals			10	1	2	3	0	—	—	—	—	—
