= 1941–42 Brooklyn Americans season =

National Hockey League team season

1941–42 Brooklyn Americans
- League: 7th NHL
- 1941–42 record: 16–29–3
- Home record: 10–12–2
- Road record: 6–17–1
- Goals for: 133
- Goals against: 175

Team information
- Coach: Art Chapman
- Captain: Tommy Anderson
- Arena: Madison Square Garden

Team leaders
- Goals: Norm Larsen (16)
- Assists: Tommy Anderson (29)
- Points: Tommy Anderson (41)
- Penalty minutes: Pat Egan (124)
- Wins: Chuck Rayner (13)
- Goals against average: Chuck Rayner (3.47)

The 1941–42 Brooklyn Americans season was the 17th and final season of the Americans NHL franchise. The Americans did not qualify for the playoffs. After the season, the Americans franchise was suspended for the duration of World War II. Although general manager Red Dutton intended to revive the franchise after the war, the franchise folded in 1946.

== Offseason ==
The team's name was changed to the Brooklyn Americans and the team moved its practices to the Brooklyn Ice Palace. However, with no arena in Brooklyn suitable even for temporary use, the club continued to rent Madison Square Garden for games.

== Regular season ==
The season started respectably for the Americans with a 3–3–1 record before going through a 10-game losing streak from November 22 through December 16. The United States entered World War II after the December 1941 attack on Pearl Harbor, and the Americans suspended operations after the season, expecting many of their players to enlist.

=== Final standings ===
National Hockey League
	GP	W	L	T	Pts	GF	GA
**New York Rangers**	48	29	17	2	60	177	143
**Toronto Maple Leafs**	48	27	18	3	57	158	136
**Boston Bruins**	48	25	17	6	56	160	118
**Chicago Black Hawks**	48	22	23	3	47	145	155
**Detroit Red Wings**	48	19	25	4	42	140	147
**Montreal Canadiens**	48	18	27	3	39	134	173
Brooklyn Americans	48	16	29	3	35	133	175

Note: GP = Games played, W = Wins, L = Losses, T = Ties, Pts = Points, GF = Goals for, GA = Goals against
Teams that qualified for the playoffs are highlighted in bold.

=== Record vs. opponents ===
1941–42 NHL Records
Team	BOS	BRK	CHI	DET	MTL	NYR	TOR
Boston	—	4–4	3–3–2	4–2–2	6–1–1	4–4	4–3–1
Brooklyn	4–4	—	2–6	3–4–1	3–4–1	2–5–1	2–6
Chicago	3–3–2	6–2	—	3–5	4–3–1	2–6	4–4
Detroit	2–4–2	4–3–1	5–3	—	5–3	1–7	2–5–1
Montreal	1–6–1	4–3–1	3–4–1	3–5	—	4–4	3–5
New York	4–4	5–2–1	6–2	7–1	4–4	—	3–4–1
Toronto	3–4–1	6–2	4–4	5–2–1	5–3	4–3–1	—

== Schedule and results ==
1941–42 regular season
November

Game	Result	Date	Score	Opponent	Record
1	T	November 2, 1941	3–3 OT	@ Detroit Red Wings (1941–42)	0–0–1
2	L	November 6, 1941	0–1	@ Chicago Black Hawks (1941–42)	0–1–1
3	L	November 13, 1941	1–2	Chicago Black Hawks (1941–42)	0–2–1
4	W	November 15, 1941	4–2 OT	@ Montreal Canadiens (1941–42)	1–2–1
5	W	November 16, 1941	3–2	Montreal Canadiens (1941–42)	2–2–1
6	L	November 18, 1941	2–7	@ Boston Bruins (1941–42)	2–3–1
7	W	November 20, 1941	4–1	@ New York Rangers (1941–42)	3–3–1
8	L	November 22, 1941	1–2	Detroit Red Wings (1941–42)	3–4–1
9	L	November 27, 1941	2–6 OT	Boston Bruins (1941–42)	3–5–1
10	L	November 29, 1941	2–8	@ Toronto Maple Leafs (1941–42)	3–6–1
11	L	November 30, 1941	1–5	Toronto Maple Leafs (1941–42)	3–7–1

December

Game	Result	Date	Score	Opponent	Record
12	L	December 4, 1941	3–4	@ Detroit Red Wings (1941–42)	3–8–1
13	L	December 7, 1941	4–5	@ Chicago Black Hawks (1941–42)	3–9–1
14	L	December 11, 1941	3–5	New York Rangers (1941–42)	3–10–1
15	L	December 13, 1941	2–3 OT	@ Montreal Canadiens (1941–42)	3–11–1
16	L	December 14, 1941	2–4	Montreal Canadiens (1941–42)	3–12–1
17	L	December 16, 1941	2–3 OT	@ New York Rangers (1941–42)	3–13–1
18	W	December 18, 1941	4–3 OT	Detroit Red Wings (1941–42)	4–13–1
19	W	December 23, 1941	4–3	Chicago Black Hawks (1941–42)	5–13–1
20	L	December 25, 1941	2–3 OT	@ Detroit Red Wings (1941–42)	5–14–1
21	W	December 28, 1941	2–1	Toronto Maple Leafs (1941–42)	6–14–1
22	L	December 31, 1941	3–4	New York Rangers (1941–42)	6–15–1

January

Game	Result	Date	Score	Opponent	Record
23	L	January 1, 1942	4–5	@ Boston Bruins (1941–42)	6–16–1
24	L	January 3, 1942	2–4	@ Toronto Maple Leafs (1941–42)	6–17–1
25	W	January 4, 1942	3–2	Boston Bruins (1941–42)	7–17–1
26	W	January 9, 1942	5–4	Detroit Red Wings (1941–42)	8–17–1
27	W	January 10, 1942	2–0	@ Montreal Canadiens (1941–42)	9–17–1
28	L	January 11, 1942	0–2	Montreal Canadiens (1941–42)	9–18–1
29	L	January 13, 1942	2–9	@ New York Rangers (1941–42)	9–19–1
30	L	January 15, 1942	4–7	Chicago Black Hawks (1941–42)	9–20–1
31	W	January 18, 1942	5–3	@ Detroit Red Wings (1941–42)	10–20–1
32	L	January 22, 1942	2–4	@ Chicago Black Hawks (1941–42)	10–21–1
33	L	January 24, 1942	2–3	@ Toronto Maple Leafs (1941–42)	10–22–1
34	W	January 29, 1942	5–4	Boston Bruins (1941–42)	11–22–1

February

Game	Result	Date	Score	Opponent	Record
35	W	February 1, 1942	2–1	@ Boston Bruins (1941–42)	12–22–1
36	L	February 3, 1942	2–3 OT	New York Rangers (1941–42)	12–23–1
37	L	February 8, 1942	3–4	Toronto Maple Leafs (1941–42)	12–24–1
38	W	February 15, 1942	5–1	@ New York Rangers (1941–42)	13–24–1
39	W	February 19, 1942	6–4	Boston Bruins (1941–42)	14–24–1
40	L	February 21, 1942	3–4	@ Toronto Maple Leafs (1941–42)	14–25–1
41	L	February 24, 1942	2–3	Detroit Red Wings (1941–42)	14–26–1
42	L	February 28, 1942	3–8	@ Montreal Canadiens (1941–42)	14–27–1

March

Game	Result	Date	Score	Opponent	Record
43	T	March 1, 1942	1–1 OT	Montreal Canadiens (1941–42)	14–27–2
44	T	March 3, 1942	4–4 OT	New York Rangers (1941–42)	14–27–3
45	W	March 5, 1942	2–1	Chicago Black Hawks (1941–42)	15–27–3
46	L	March 8, 1942	1–6	@ Chicago Black Hawks (1941–42)	15–28–3
47	W	March 15, 1942	6–3	Toronto Maple Leafs (1941–42)	16–28–3
48	L	March 17, 1942	3–8	@ Boston Bruins (1941–42)	16–29–3

Legend: Win (2 points) Loss (0 points) Tie (1 point)

== Player statistics ==
=== Regular season ===
Scoring

Player	GP	G	A	Pts	PIM
Tommy Anderson	48	12	29	41	54
Mel Hill	47	14	23	37	10
Bill Benson	45	8	21	29	31
Pat Egan	48	8	20	28	124
Murray Armstrong	45	6	22	28	15
Buzz Boll	48	11	15	26	23
Norm Larson	40	16	9	25	6
Harry Watson	47	10	8	18	6
Ken Mosdell	41	7	9	16	16
Murph Chamberlain	11	6	9	15	16
Wilf Field	41	6	9	15	23
Fred Thurier	27	7	7	14	4
Joe Krol	24	9	3	12	8
Bill Summerhill	16	5	5	10	18
Gus Marker	17	2	5	7	2
Nick Knott	14	3	1	4	9
Jack Church	15	1	3	4	10
Peanuts O'Flaherty	11	1	1	2	0
Andy Branigan	21	0	2	2	26
Ralph Wycherley	2	0	2	2	2
Pep Kelly	8	1	0	1	0
Red Heron	11	0	1	1	2
Pete Kelly	7	0	1	1	4
Hazen McAndrew	7	0	1	1	6
Chuck Rayner	36	0	0	0	0
Earl Robertson	12	0	0	0	0

Goaltending

Player	MIN	GP	W	L	T	GA	GAA	SA	SV	SV%	SO
Chuck Rayner	2230	36	13	21	2	129	3.47				1
Earl Robertson	750	12	3	8	1	46	3.68				0
Team:	2980	48	16	29	3	175	3.52				1

== Awards and records ==
- Hart Trophy – Tommy Anderson

== See also ==
- 1941–42 NHL season
