= Joe Turner (ice hockey) =

Canadian ice hockey player (1919–c. 1945

- Turner circa 1941–42
- Born: March 28, 1919 Windsor, Ontario, Canada
- Died: January 21, 1945 (aged 25) Hurtgen Forest, Germany
- Height: 5 ft 10 in (178 cm)
- Weight: 182 lb (83 kg; 13 st 0 lb)
- Position: Goaltender
- Caught: Left
- Played for: Detroit Red Wings
- Playing career: 1940–1942

Joseph Turner (March 28, 1919 – December 13, 1944 or January 21, 1945) was a Canadian professional ice hockey goaltender who played one game in the National Hockey League with the Detroit Red Wings during the 1941–42 season. He later served in the United States Army during the Second World War, and was killed in action during the Battle of Hürtgen Forest in 1945.

== Biography ==
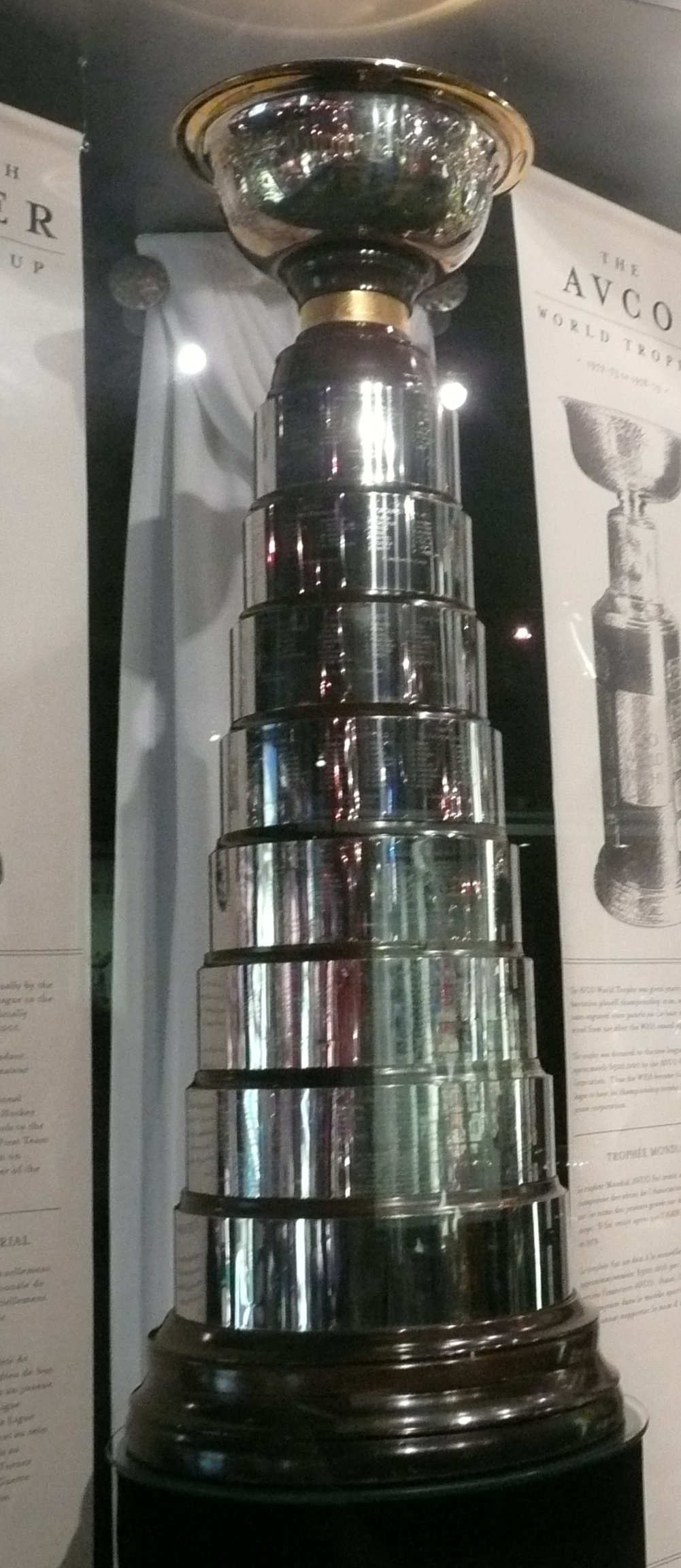
The Turner Cup trophy

Turner was born in Windsor, Ontario. He played with the Guelph Indians of the Ontario Hockey Association and led the league in goals allowed on three occasions. Detroit, which held his rights, sent him to their American Hockey League affiliate, the Indianapolis Capitals, in 1941. There he played in the first AHL All-Star Game and was a first team All-Star as goaltender. He would also lead the Capitals to a Calder Cup championship. On February 5, 1942, he replaced an injured Johnny Mowers in a 3–3 tie against the Toronto Maple Leafs for his only appearance in the NHL.

After the season, he signed up for the United States Army as a 2nd Lieutenant in Company K, 311th Infantry, 78th Division and fought in World War II. He was originally classified as Missing in Action in the Hurtgen Forest, Germany on December 13, 1944. For his service, the International Hockey League named its championship trophy, the Turner Cup, after him.

== Career statistics ==
=== Regular season and playoffs ===
			Regular season								Playoffs
Season	Team	League	GP	W	L	T	Min	GA	SO	GAA	GP	W	L	T	Min	GA	SO	GAA
1933–34	Toronto Canoe Club	OHA	9	—	—	—	540	24	0	2.72	2	—	—	—	120	13	0	6.50
1934–35	Windsor Motors	MOHL	3	—	—	—	180	13	0	4.33	—	—	—	—	—	—	—	—
1935–36	Windsor Motors	MOHL	—	—	—	—	—	—	—	—	—	—	—	—	—	—	—	—
1936–37	Windsor Bulldogs	MOHL	26	—	—	—	1560	91	0	3.50	5	1	2	2	300	13	0	2.68
1937–38	Stratford Midgets	OHA	14	—	—	—	840	33	0	2.36	7	2	3	1	420	23	1	3.28
1938–39	Guelph Indians	OHA	14	—	—	—	840	38	2	2.71	2	—	—	—	120	7	0	3.50
1939–40	Detroit Holzbaugh	MOHL	36	27	3	6	1620	76	6	2.11	12	9	3	0	730	27	2	2.22
1939–40	Windsor Chryslers	MOHL	1	1	0	0	60	1	0	1.00	—	—	—	—	—	—	—	—
1939–40	London Mohawks	OHA Sr	1	1	0	0	60	1	0	1.00	—	—	—	—	—	—	—	—
1940–41	Detroit Holzbaugh	MOHL	27	13	10	4	1620	84	1	3.11	7	4	3	0	420	25	0	3.57
1941–42	Detroit Red Wings	NHL	1	0	0	1	70	3	0	2.57	—	—	—	—	—	—	—	—
1941–42	Indianapolis Capitals	AHL	52	34	10	7	3175	129	4	2.44	10	7	3	—	630	34	0	3.24
NHL totals			1	0	0	1	70	3	0	2.57	—	—	—	—	—	—	—	—

== See also ==
- List of players who played only one game in the NHL
