= 1941–42 New York Rangers season =

NHL hockey team season

1941–42 New York Rangers
- Prince of Wales Trophy winners
- League: 1st NHL
- 1941–42 record: 29–17–2
- Home record: 15–8–1
- Road record: 14–9–1
- Goals for: 177
- Goals against: 143

Team information
- General manager: Lester Patrick
- Coach: Frank Boucher
- Captain: Art Coulter
- Arena: Madison Square Garden

Team leaders
- Goals: Lynn Patrick (32)
- Assists: Phil Watson (37)
- Points: Bryan Hextall (56)
- Penalty minutes: Phil Watson (58)
- Wins: Jim Henry (29)
- Goals against average: Jim Henry (2.90)

The 1941–42 New York Rangers season was the franchise's 16th season. In the regular season, New York led the NHL with 60 points, and compiled a 29–17–2 record. The Rangers lost in the NHL semi-finals to the Toronto Maple Leafs, four games to two.

== Regular season ==
=== Final standings ===
National Hockey League
| | GP | W | L | T | Pts | GF | GA |
|---|---|---|---|---|---|---|---|
| **New York Rangers** | 48 | 29 | 17 | 2 | 60 | 177 | 143 |
| **Toronto Maple Leafs** | 48 | 27 | 18 | 3 | 57 | 158 | 136 |
| **Boston Bruins** | 48 | 25 | 17 | 6 | 56 | 160 | 118 |
| **Chicago Black Hawks** | 48 | 22 | 23 | 3 | 47 | 145 | 155 |
| **Detroit Red Wings** | 48 | 19 | 25 | 4 | 42 | 140 | 147 |
| **Montreal Canadiens** | 48 | 18 | 27 | 3 | 39 | 134 | 173 |
| Brooklyn Americans | 48 | 16 | 29 | 3 | 35 | 133 | 175 |

Note: GP = Games played, W = Wins, L = Losses, T = Ties, Pts = Points, GF = Goals for, GA = Goals against
Teams that qualified for the playoffs are highlighted in bold.

=== Record vs. opponents ===
1941–42 NHL Records
| Team | BOS | BRK | CHI | DET | MTL | NYR | TOR |
|---|---|---|---|---|---|---|---|
| Boston | — | 4–4 | 3–3–2 | 4–2–2 | 6–1–1 | 4–4 | 4–3–1 |
| Brooklyn | 4–4 | — | 2–6 | 3–4–1 | 3–4–1 | 2–5–1 | 2–6 |
| Chicago | 3–3–2 | 6–2 | — | 3–5 | 4–3–1 | 2–6 | 4–4 |
| Detroit | 2–4–2 | 4–3–1 | 5–3 | — | 5–3 | 1–7 | 2–5–1 |
| Montreal | 1–6–1 | 4–3–1 | 3–4–1 | 3–5 | — | 4–4 | 3–5 |
| New York | 4–4 | 5–2–1 | 6–2 | 7–1 | 4–4 | — | 3–4–1 |
| Toronto | 3–4–1 | 6–2 | 4–4 | 5–2–1 | 5–3 | 4–3–1 | — |

== Schedule and results ==
1941–42 regular season
November: 6–5–0 (home: 2–4–0; road: 4–1–0)

| Game | November | Opponent | Score | Record |
|---|---|---|---|---|
| 1 | 1 | @ Toronto Maple Leafs | 4–3 | 1–0–0 |
| 2 | 9 | @ Detroit Red Wings | 3–1 | 2–0–0 |
| 3 | 15 | Boston Bruins | 2–1 | 2–1–0 |
| 4 | 16 | @ Boston Bruins | 2–1 | 2–2–0 |
| 5 | 18 | Toronto Maple Leafs | 8–6 | 2–3–0 |
| 6 | 20 | Brooklyn Americans | 4–1 | 2–4–0 |
| 7 | 22 | @ Montreal Canadiens | 7–2 | 3–4–0 |
| 8 | 23 | Montreal Canadiens | 6–4 | 3–5–0 |
| 9 | 25 | Chicago Black Hawks | 5–4 OT | 4–5–0 |
| 10 | 29 | Detroit Red Wings | 4–1 | 5–5–0 |
| 11 | 30 | @ Chicago Black Hawks | 5–1 | 6–5–0 |

December: 8–3–0 (home: 4–0–0; road: 4–3–0)

| Game | December | Opponent | Score | Record |
|---|---|---|---|---|
| 12 | 7 | Boston Bruins | 5–4 | 7–5–0 |
| 13 | 11 | @ Brooklyn Americans | 5–3 | 8–5–0 |
| 14 | 13 | @ Toronto Maple Leafs | 2–1 | 8–6–0 |
| 15 | 16 | Brooklyn Americans | 3–2 OT | 9–6–0 |
| 16 | 18 | @ Chicago Black Hawks | 5–1 | 9–7–0 |
| 17 | 21 | Montreal Canadiens | 4–3 OT | 10–7–0 |
| 18 | 23 | @ Boston Bruins | 3–2 | 10–8–0 |
| 19 | 25 | Chicago Black Hawks | 5–2 | 11–8–0 |
| 20 | 27 | @ Montreal Canadiens | 4–2 | 12–8–0 |
| 21 | 28 | @ Detroit Red Wings | 3–1 | 13–8–0 |
| 22 | 31 | @ Brooklyn Americans | 4–3 | 14–8–0 |

January: 6–1–1 (home: 4–0–1; road: 2–1–0)

| Game | January | Opponent | Score | Record |
|---|---|---|---|---|
| 23 | 1 | Toronto Maple Leafs | 3–3 OT | 14–8–1 |
| 24 | 6 | Detroit Red Wings | 3–2 | 15–8–1 |
| 25 | 13 | Brooklyn Americans | 9–2 | 16–8–1 |
| 26 | 17 | @ Montreal Canadiens | 6–2 | 16–9–1 |
| 27 | 18 | Montreal Canadiens | 5–4 OT | 17–9–1 |
| 28 | 20 | @ Boston Bruins | 4–2 | 18–9–1 |
| 29 | 24 | @ Detroit Red Wings | 3–2 | 19–9–1 |
| 30 | 25 | Detroit Red Wings | 11–2 | 20–9–1 |

February: 7–5–0 (home: 4–3–0; road: 3–2–0)

| Game | February | Opponent | Score | Record |
|---|---|---|---|---|
| 31 | 1 | Toronto Maple Leafs | 7–2 | 21–9–1 |
| 32 | 3 | @ Brooklyn Americans | 3–2 OT | 22–9–1 |
| 33 | 5 | Boston Bruins | 4–1 | 23–9–1 |
| 34 | 7 | @ Toronto Maple Leafs | 6–4 | 23–10–1 |
| 35 | 8 | @ Chicago Black Hawks | 4–3 | 24–10–1 |
| 36 | 10 | Chicago Black Hawks | 5–2 | 24–11–1 |
| 37 | 14 | @ Montreal Canadiens | 5–3 | 24–12–1 |
| 38 | 15 | Brooklyn Americans | 5–1 | 24–13–1 |
| 39 | 17 | Montreal Canadiens | 2–1 OT | 24–14–1 |
| 40 | 22 | Chicago Black Hawks | 3–2 | 25–14–1 |
| 41 | 24 | @ Boston Bruins | 4–3 | 26–14–1 |
| 42 | 26 | Detroit Red Wings | 7–4 | 27–14–1 |

March: 2–3–1 (home: 1–1–0; road: 1–2–1)

| Game | March | Opponent | Score | Record |
|---|---|---|---|---|
| 43 | 3 | @ Brooklyn Americans | 4–4 OT | 27–14–2 |
| 44 | 5 | @ Detroit Red Wings | 5–2 | 27–15–2 |
| 45 | 7 | @ Toronto Maple Leafs | 4–2 | 27–16–2 |
| 46 | 8 | Toronto Maple Leafs | 2–0 | 28–16–2 |
| 47 | 12 | Boston Bruins | 2–1 | 28–17–2 |
| 48 | 15 | @ Chicago Black Hawks | 5–1 | 29–17–2 |

Legend: Win (2 points) Loss (0 points) Tie (1 point)

== Playoffs ==
1942 Stanley Cup playoffs
Semifinals vs. (2) Toronto Maple Leafs – Toronto wins 4–2

| Game | Date | Visitor | Score | Home | OT | Series |
|---|---|---|---|---|---|---|
| 1 | March 21 | New York Rangers | 1–3 | Toronto Maple Leafs | | Toronto leads series 1–0 |
| 2 | March 22 | Toronto Maple Leafs | 4–2 | New York Rangers | | Toronto leads series 2–0 |
| 3 | March 24 | Toronto Maple Leafs | 0–3 | New York Rangers | | Toronto leads series 2–1 |
| 4 | March 28 | New York Rangers | 1–2 | Toronto Maple Leafs | OT | Toronto leads series 3–1 |
| 5 | March 29 | Toronto Maple Leafs | 1–3 | New York Rangers | | Toronto leads series 3–2 |
| 6 | March 31 | New York Rangers | 2–3 | Toronto Maple Leafs | | Toronto wins series 4–2 |

Legend: Win Loss

== Player statistics ==
Skaters

Regular season
| Player | GP | G | A | Pts | PIM |
|---|---|---|---|---|---|
| Bryan Hextall | 48 | 24 | 32 | 56 | 30 |
| Lynn Patrick | 47 | 32 | 22 | 54 | 18 |
| Phil Watson | 48 | 15 | 37 | 52 | 58 |
| Alex Shibicky | 45 | 20 | 14 | 34 | 16 |
| Clint Smith | 47 | 10 | 24 | 34 | 4 |
| Grant Warwick | 44 | 16 | 17 | 33 | 36 |
| Neil Colville | 48 | 8 | 25 | 33 | 37 |
| Mac Colville | 46 | 14 | 16 | 30 | 26 |
| Walter Pratt | 47 | 4 | 24 | 28 | 65 |
| Alf Pike | 34 | 8 | 19 | 27 | 16 |
| Alan Kuntz | 31 | 10 | 11 | 21 | 10 |
| Arthur Coulter | 47 | 1 | 16 | 17 | 31 |
| Bill Juzda | 45 | 4 | 8 | 12 | 29 |
| Ehrhardt Heller | 35 | 6 | 5 | 11 | 22 |
| Hubert Macey | 9 | 3 | 5 | 8 | 0 |
| Norman Tustin | 18 | 2 | 4 | 6 | 0 |
| Norm Burns | 11 | 0 | 4 | 4 | 2 |

Playoffs
| Player | GP | G | A | Pts | PIM |
|---|---|---|---|---|---|
| Neil Colville | 6 | 0 | 6 | 6 | 6 |
| Alex Shibicky | 6 | 3 | 2 | 5 | 2 |
| Phil Watson | 6 | 1 | 4 | 5 | 8 |
| Walter Pratt | 6 | 1 | 3 | 4 | 34 |
| Mac Colville | 6 | 3 | 1 | 4 | 0 |
| Bryan Hextall | 6 | 1 | 1 | 2 | 4 |
| Bill Juzda | 6 | 0 | 1 | 1 | 4 |
| Arthur Coulter | 6 | 0 | 1 | 1 | 4 |
| Alan Kuntz | 6 | 1 | 0 | 1 | 2 |
| Alf Pike | 6 | 1 | 0 | 1 | 4 |
| Grant Warwick | 6 | 0 | 1 | 1 | 2 |
| Lynn Patrick | 6 | 1 | 0 | 1 | 0 |
| Hubert Macey | 1 | 0 | 0 | 0 | 0 |
| Ehrhardt Heller | 6 | 0 | 0 | 0 | 0 |
| Clint Smith | 5 | 0 | 0 | 0 | 0 |

Goaltenders

Regular season
| Player | GP | TOI | W | L | T | GA | GAA | SO |
|---|---|---|---|---|---|---|---|---|
| Jim Henry | 48 | 2960 | 29 | 17 | 2 | 143 | 2.90 | 1 |

Playoffs
| Player | GP | TOI | W | L | GA | GAA | SO |
|---|---|---|---|---|---|---|---|
| Jim Henry | 6 | 360 | 2 | 4 | 13 | 2.17 | 1 |

^{†}Denotes player spent time with another team before joining Rangers. Stats reflect time with Rangers only.
^{‡}Traded mid-season. Stats reflect time with Rangers only.

Note:

Pos = Position;GP = Games played; G = Goals; A = Assists; Pts = Points; PIM = Penalty minutes; +/- = Plus/minus; PPG = Power-play goals; SHG = Short-handed goals; GWG = Game-winning goals
Pos = Position;GP = Games played; Min, TOI = Minutes played; W = Wins; L = Losses; T,T/OT = Ties; OTL = Overtime losses; GA = Goals-against; GAA = Goals-against average; SO = Shutouts; SA = Shots against; SV = Shots saved;SV% = Save percentage;

== See also ==
- 1941–42 NHL season
