= Nick Damore =

Canadian ice hockey player

- Born: July 10, 1916 Niagara Falls, Ontario, Canada
- Died: April 16, 1969 (aged 52) Niagara Falls, New York, United States
- Height: 5 ft 6 in (168 cm)
- Weight: 160 lb (73 kg; 11 st 6 lb)
- Position: Goaltender
- Caught: Left
- Played for: Boston Bruins
- Playing career: 1934–1947; 1950–1952

Nicholas Joseph Damore (July 10, 1916 – April 16, 1969) was a Canadian professional ice hockey goaltender who played in one National Hockey League game for the Boston Bruins during the 1941–42 season. The rest of his career, which lasted from 1934 to 1952, was mainly spent with the Hershey Bears in the Eastern Amateur Hockey League and American Hockey League.

== Playing career ==
On January 25, 1942, Damore replaced regular goalie Frank Brimsek, who was unable to play due a broken nose. The Bruins defeated the Montreal Canadiens 7–3. Brimsek returned for the following game. He died in 1969. He is the brother of Hank D'Amore

== Career statistics ==
=== Regular season and playoffs ===
			Regular season								Playoffs
Season	Team	League	GP	W	L	T	MIN	GA	SO	GAA	GP	W	L	MIN	GA	SO	GAA
1932–33	Niagara Falls Cataracts	OHA	1	1	0	0	60	1	0	1.00	—	—	—	—	—	—	—
1934–35	Hershey B'ars	EAHL	21	10	9	2	1260	56	3	2.67	6	3	3	360	22	0	3.67
1935–36	Hershey B'ars	EAHL	22	16	5	1	1320	42	5	1.91	5	—	—	300	15	0	3.00
1935–36	Baltimore Orioles	EAHL	1	0	1	0	60	5	0	5.00	—	—	—	—	—	—	—
1936–37	Hershey B'ars	EAHL	34	18	9	7	2040	61	1	1.79	4	3	1	250	9	1	2.16
1937–38	Hershey B'ars	EAHL	57	31	15	11	3420	135	7	2.36	—	—	—	—	—	—	—
1938–39	Providence Reds	IAHL	43	16	18	9	2700	126	6	2.80	—	—	—	—	—	—	—
1938–39	Hershey Bears	IAHL	—	—	—	—	—	—	—	—	2	1	1	120	8	0	4.00
1939–40	Hershey Bears	IAHL	42	21	18	3	2580	109	4	2.53	6	3	3	360	15	1	2.50
1940–41	Hershey Bears	AHL	56	24	23	9	3470	189	4	3.27	10	6	4	640	20	2	1.88
1941–42	Boston Bruins	NHL	1	1	0	0	60	3	0	3.00	—	—	—	—	—	—	—
1941–42	Hershey Bears	AHL	56	33	17	6	3360	169	4	3.02	10	6	4	620	27	1	2.61
1942–43	Hershey Bears	AHL	54	34	13	7	3330	162	2	2.92	6	2	4	370	23	1	3.73
1943–44	Hershey Bears	AHL	54	30	16	8	3240	133	6	2.46	7	3	4	425	18	0	2.54
1944–45	Hershey Bears	AHL	57	27	23	7	3420	176	7	3.09	11	6	5	660	29	0	2.63
1945–46	Hershey Bears	AHL	46	20	21	5	2760	160	3	3.48	—	—	—	—	—	—	—
1946–47	Philadelphia Rockets	AHL	56	5	44	7	3360	342	1	6.11	—	—	—	—	—	—	—
1950–51	Johnstown Jets	EAHL	23	10	12	1	1380	91	2	3.95	6	2	4	360	27	0	4.50
1951–52	Washington Lions	EAHL	12	2	9	1	720	57	0	4.75	—	—	—	—	—	—	—
IAHL/AHL totals			464	210	193	52	28,280	1566	37	3.32	—	—	—	—	—	—	—	—
NHL totals			1	1	0	0	60	3	0	3.00	—	—	—	—	—	—	—	—

== See also ==
- List of players who played only one game in the NHL
