= 1941–42 Toronto Maple Leafs season =

NHL hockey team season (won Stanley Cup)

1941–42 Toronto Maple Leafs
- Stanley Cup champions
- League: 2nd NHL
- 1941–42 record: 27–18–3
- Home record: 18–6–0
- Road record: 9–12–3
- Goals for: 158
- Goals against: 136

Team information
- General manager: Conn Smythe
- Coach: Hap Day
- Captain: Syl Apps
- Arena: Maple Leaf Gardens

Team leaders
- Goals: Gordie Drillon (23)
- Assists: Billy Taylor (26)
- Points: Gordie Drillon and Syl Apps (41)
- Penalty minutes: Rudolph Kampman (67)
- Wins: Turk Broda (27)
- Goals against average: Turk Broda (2.76)

The 1941–42 Toronto Maple Leafs season was the club's 25th season in the NHL. The Maple Leafs came off a very solid season in 1940–41, finishing with their second highest point total in club history, as they had a 28–14–6 record, earning 62 points, which was two fewer than the 1934–35 team accumulated; however, they lost to the Boston Bruins in the semi-finals, extending their Stanley Cup drought to nine seasons.

That drought was broken, however, when the Maple Leafs defeated the Detroit Red Wings in the 1942 Stanley Cup Finals, coming back after losing the first three games to win the Stanley Cup in seven games. They were the first team to come back from an 0–3 deficit to win a playoff series 4–3, and although it has happened in several playoff series since then, this remains the only time it has happened in a championship round.

== Off-season ==
Before Smythe left to take up training with his 30th Battery, he signed up three rookies to the Maple Leafs: Bob Goldham, Ernie Dickens and John McCreedy. Lorne Carr's contract was purchased from the New York Americans. The final addition to the team was Pete Langelle, who made the team after playing part-time in previous seasons.

== Regular season ==
Toronto got off to a quick start, winning 14 of their first 19 games, battling with the Boston Bruins and New York Rangers for top spot in the NHL. A 4–7–3 slump in their next 14 games saw Toronto fall behind the Bruins and Rangers, however, the Leafs followed up their slump by posting a 7–1–0 record in their next 8 games, before dropping 5 of final 7 games to end the season. Toronto finished the year with a record of 27–18–3, recording 57 points, and finishing in second place in the NHL, three points behind the first place New York Rangers.

The Leafs offense was led by Syl Apps, who despite missing 10 games to injuries, finished tied for the club lead in points with 41. Gordie Drillon also finished with 41 points, and he scored a team best 23 goals, while Billy Taylor had a club high 26 assists. Sweeney Schriner managed to join Drillon in the 20 goal club, as he managed to get 20 goals and earned 36 points. Bucko McDonald led the Leafs blueline, recording 21 points, while Rudolph Kampman provided the team toughness, getting 67 penalty minutes.

In goal, Turk Broda got all the action, winning 27 games and posting a 2.76 GAA, along with earning 6 shutouts.

The Maple Leafs would open the playoffs against the best team in the league, the New York Rangers in a best of seven semi-final series. The Leafs opened the series with a victory at Maple Leaf Gardens with a solid 3–1 win, then managed to go up two games by defeating the Rangers 4–2 at Madison Square Garden. New York managed to take the third game, shutting out Toronto 3–0, however, the Leafs would go up 3–1 in the series, winning the fourth game 2–1 at home. New York staved off elimination in the fifth game, holding off Toronto for a 3–1 win, however, the Leafs ended the series in the sixth game, hanging on for a 3–2 victory, and a spot in the Stanley Cup finals.

Toronto's opponent in the 1942 Stanley Cup Finals was the Detroit Red Wings, who finished the year with a weak 19–25–4 record, ending up in fifth in the league. Detroit defeated the Montreal Canadiens and Boston Bruins to earn a spot in the finals. The Wings surprised Toronto in the series opener, winning the game 3–2, then Detroit managed to take the second game by a 4–2 score to go home with a 2–0 series lead. The Red Wings stayed hot, winning the third game at the Detroit Olympia 5–2, pushing the Leafs to the brink of elimination. Toronto responded in the fourth game, narrowly defeating Detroit 4–3 to cut the Wings series lead to 3–1. The Leafs returned home for the fifth game, and dominated Detroit, winning the game 9–3 and now were down 3–2 in the series. Turk Broda stole the show in the sixth game, shutting out Detroit 3–0 to even the series up, and the Leafs completed their miracle comeback with a 3–1 victory in the seventh and deciding game in front of a record breaking crowd of over 16,000 fans to win the Stanley Cup for the fourth time in club history, and first time since the 1931–32 season. This comeback was never repeated in a Stanley Cup finals since.

=== Final standings ===
National Hockey League
	GP	W	L	T	Pts	GF	GA
**New York Rangers**	48	29	17	2	60	177	143
**Toronto Maple Leafs**	48	27	18	3	57	158	136
**Boston Bruins**	48	25	17	6	56	160	118
**Chicago Black Hawks**	48	22	23	3	47	145	155
**Detroit Red Wings**	48	19	25	4	42	140	147
**Montreal Canadiens**	48	18	27	3	39	134	173
Brooklyn Americans	48	16	29	3	35	133	175

Note: GP = Games played, W = Wins, L = Losses, T = Ties, Pts = Points, GF = Goals for, GA = Goals against
Teams that qualified for the playoffs are highlighted in bold.

=== Record vs. opponents ===
1941–42 NHL Records
Team	BOS	BRK	CHI	DET	MTL	NYR	TOR
Boston	—	4–4	3–3–2	4–2–2	6–1–1	4–4	4–3–1
Brooklyn	4–4	—	2–6	3–4–1	3–4–1	2–5–1	2–6
Chicago	3–3–2	6–2	—	3–5	4–3–1	2–6	4–4
Detroit	2–4–2	4–3–1	5–3	—	5–3	1–7	2–5–1
Montreal	1–6–1	4–3–1	3–4–1	3–5	—	4–4	3–5
New York	4–4	5–2–1	6–2	7–1	4–4	—	3–4–1
Toronto	3–4–1	6–2	4–4	5–2–1	5–3	4–3–1	—

== Schedule and results ==
1941–42 regular season
November

Game	Date	Visitor	Score	Home	Record	Pts
1	November 1	New York Rangers	4–3	Toronto Maple Leafs	0–1–0	0
2	November 8	Boston Bruins	0–2	Toronto Maple Leafs	1–1–0	2
3	November 13	Montreal Canadiens	2–4	Toronto Maple Leafs	2–1–0	4
4	November 15	Detroit Red Wings	1–2	Toronto Maple Leafs	3–1–0	6
5	November 18	Toronto Maple Leafs	8–6	New York Rangers	4–1–0	8
6	November 20	Toronto Maple Leafs	4–3	Detroit Red Wings	5–1–0	10
7	November 22	Chicago Black Hawks	0–3	Toronto Maple Leafs	6–1–0	12
8	November 23	Toronto Maple Leafs	2–3	Chicago Black Hawks	6–2–0	12
9	November 29	Brooklyn Americans	2–8	Toronto Maple Leafs	7–2–0	14
10	November 30	Toronto Maple Leafs	5–1	Brooklyn Americans	8–2–0	16

December

Game	Date	Visitor	Score	Home	Record	Pts
11	December 2	Toronto Maple Leafs	1–3	Boston Bruins	8–3–0	16
12	December 6	Montreal Canadiens	1–3	Toronto Maple Leafs	9–3–0	18
13	December 11	Toronto Maple Leafs	1–2	Montreal Canadiens	9–4–0	18
14	December 13	New York Rangers	1–2	Toronto Maple Leafs	10–4–0	20
15	December 14	Toronto Maple Leafs	4–0	Detroit Red Wings	11–4–0	22
16	December 20	Chicago Black Hawks	2–0	Toronto Maple Leafs	11–5–0	22
17	December 21	Toronto Maple Leafs	3–0	Chicago Black Hawks	12–5–0	24
18	December 25	Boston Bruins	0–2	Toronto Maple Leafs	13–5–0	26
19	December 27	Detroit Red Wings	3–5	Toronto Maple Leafs	14–5–0	28
20	December 28	Toronto Maple Leafs	1–2	Brooklyn Americans	14–6–0	28
21	December 30	Toronto Maple Leafs	1–4	Boston Bruins	14–7–0	28

January

Game	Date	Visitor	Score	Home	Record	Pts
22	January 1	Toronto Maple Leafs	3–3	New York Rangers	14–7–1	29
23	January 3	Brooklyn Americans	2–4	Toronto Maple Leafs	15–7–1	31
24	January 10	Detroit Red Wings	6–4	Toronto Maple Leafs	15–8–1	31
25	January 15	Toronto Maple Leafs	3–2	Montreal Canadiens	16–8–1	33
26	January 17	Chicago Black Hawks	4–2	Toronto Maple Leafs	16–9–1	33
27	January 24	Brooklyn Americans	2–3	Toronto Maple Leafs	17–9–1	35
28	January 25	Toronto Maple Leafs	4–6	Chicago Black Hawks	17–10–1	35
29	January 27	Toronto Maple Leafs	0–0	Boston Bruins	17–10–2	36
30	January 29	Montreal Canadiens	3–7	Toronto Maple Leafs	18–10–2	38
31	January 31	Boston Bruins	3–2	Toronto Maple Leafs	18–11–2	38

February

Game	Date	Visitor	Score	Home	Record	Pts
32	February 1	Toronto Maple Leafs	2–7	New York Rangers	18–12–2	38
33	February 5	Toronto Maple Leafs	3–3	Detroit Red Wings	18–12–3	39
34	February 7	New York Rangers	4–6	Toronto Maple Leafs	19–12–3	41
35	February 8	Toronto Maple Leafs	4–3	Brooklyn Americans	20–12–3	43
36	February 12	Toronto Maple Leafs	6–4	Montreal Canadiens	21–12–3	45
37	February 14	Detroit Red Wings	2–4	Toronto Maple Leafs	22–12–3	47
38	February 21	Brooklyn Americans	3–4	Toronto Maple Leafs	23–12–3	49
39	February 22	Toronto Maple Leafs	0–3	Detroit Red Wings	23–13–3	49
40	February 28	Chicago Black Hawks	2–8	Toronto Maple Leafs	24–13–3	51

March

Game	Date	Visitor	Score	Home	Record	Pts
41	March 1	Toronto Maple Leafs	4–3	Chicago Black Hawks	25–13–3	53
42	March 3	Toronto Maple Leafs	3–5	Boston Bruins	25–14–3	53
43	March 5	Montreal Canadiens	5–2	Toronto Maple Leafs	25–15–3	53
44	March 7	New York Rangers	2–4	Toronto Maple Leafs	26–15–3	55
45	March 8	Toronto Maple Leafs	0–2	New York Rangers	26–16–3	55
46	March 14	Boston Bruins	4–6	Toronto Maple Leafs	27–16–3	57
47	March 15	Toronto Maple Leafs	3–6	Brooklyn Americans	27–17–3	57
48	March 19	Toronto Maple Leafs	3–7	Montreal Canadiens	27–18–3	57

Legend: Win (2 points) Loss (0 points) Tie (1 point)

== Playoffs ==
1942 Stanley Cup playoffs
Semifinals vs. (1) New York Rangers – Maple Leafs win 4–2

Game	Date	Visitor	Score	Home	Series
1	March 21	New York Rangers	1–3	Toronto Maple Leafs	1–0
2	March 22	Toronto Maple Leafs	4–2	New York Rangers	2–0
3	March 24	Toronto Maple Leafs	0–3	New York Rangers	2–1
4	March 28	New York Rangers	1–2	Toronto Maple Leafs	3–1
5	March 29	Toronto Maple Leafs	1–3	New York Rangers	3–2
6	March 31	New York Rangers	2–3	Toronto Maple Leafs	4–2

Stanley Cup Finals vs. (5) Detroit Red Wings – Maple Leafs win 4–3

Game	Date	Visitor	Score	Home	Series
1	April 4	Detroit Red Wings	3–2	Toronto Maple Leafs	0–1
2	April 7	Detroit Red Wings	4–2	Toronto Maple Leafs	0–2
3	April 9	Toronto Maple Leafs	2–5	Detroit Red Wings	0–3
4	April 12	Toronto Maple Leafs	4–3	Detroit Red Wings	1–3
5	April 14	Detroit Red Wings	3–9	Toronto Maple Leafs	2–3
6	April 16	Toronto Maple Leafs	3–0	Detroit Red Wings	3–3
7	April 18	Detroit Red Wings	1–3	Toronto Maple Leafs	4–3

Legend: Win Loss

== Player statistics ==
=== Regular season ===
Scoring

Player	Pos	GP	G	A	Pts	PIM
Gordie Drillon	RW	48	23	18	41	6
Syl Apps	C	38	18	23	41	0
Billy Taylor	C	48	12	26	38	20
Sweeney Schriner	LW	47	20	16	36	21
Lorne Carr	RW	47	16	17	33	4
Pete Langelle	C	48	10	22	32	9
Hank Goldup	LW	44	12	18	30	13
Bob Davidson	LW	37	6	20	26	39
John McCreedy	RW	47	15	8	23	14
Bucko McDonald	D	48	2	19	21	24
Nick Metz	LW	30	11	9	20	20
Bob Goldham	D	19	4	7	11	25
Bingo Kampman	D	38	4	7	11	67
Wally Stanowski	D	24	1	7	8	10
Don Metz	RW	25	2	3	5	8
Ernie Dickens	D	10	2	2	4	6
Reg Hamilton	D	22	0	4	4	27
Jack Church	D	27	0	3	3	30
Turk Broda	G	48	0	0	0	0

Goaltending

Player	MIN	GP	W	L	T	GA	GAA	SO
Turk Broda	2960	48	27	18	3	136	2.76	6
Team:	2960	48	27	18	3	136	2.76	6

=== Playoffs ===
Scoring

Player	Pos	GP	G	A	Pts	PIM
Syl Apps	C	13	5	9	14	2
Wally Stanowski	D	13	2	8	10	2
Billy Taylor	C	13	2	8	10	4
Sweeney Schriner	LW	13	6	3	9	10
Nick Metz	LW	13	4	4	8	12
John McCreedy	RW	13	4	3	7	6
Don Metz	RW	4	4	3	7	0
Pete Langelle	C	13	3	3	6	2
Lorne Carr	RW	13	3	2	5	6
Gordie Drillon	RW	9	2	3	5	2
Bob Goldham	D	13	2	2	4	31
Bob Davidson	LW	13	1	2	3	20
Bingo Kampman	D	13	0	2	2	12
Bucko McDonald	D	9	0	1	1	2
Turk Broda	G	13	0	0	0	0
Ernie Dickens	D	13	0	0	0	4
Hank Goldup	LW	9	0	0	0	2
Gaye Stewart	LW	1	0	0	0	0

Goaltending

Player	MIN	GP	W	L	GA	GAA	SO
Turk Broda	780	13	8	5	31	2.38	1
Team:	780	13	8	5	31	2.38	1

Note:

Pos = Position;GP = Games played; G = Goals; A = Assists; Pts = Points; PIM = Penalty minutes; +/- = Plus/minus; PPG = Power-play goals; SHG = Short-handed goals; GWG = Game-winning goals
Pos = Position;GP = Games played; Min, TOI = Minutes played; W = Wins; L = Losses; T,T/OT = Ties; OTL = Overtime losses; GA = Goals-against; GAA = Goals-against average; SO = Shutouts; SA = Shots against; SV = Shots saved;SV% = Save percentage;

== Awards and records ==
- Lady Byng Memorial Trophy: Syl Apps
- Syl Apps, Toronto Maple Leafs, Centre, NHL First Team All-Star
- Turk Broda, Goaltender, NHL Second Team All-Star
- Gordie Drillon, Right Wing, NHL Second Team All-Star
- Bucko McDonald, Defence, NHL Second Team All-Star

The 1941–42 Toronto Maple Leafs were inducted into the Ontario Sports Hall of Fame in 2003.

== Transactions ==
- October 8, 1941: Acquired Viv Allen and Glenn Brydson from the Brooklyn Americans for Phil McAtee and return of Peanuts O'Flaherty from a loan
- October 30, 1941: Traded Norman Mann to the Pittsburgh Hornets of the AHL for cash
- October 30, 1941: Acquired Lorne Carr from the Brooklyn Americans for the loan of Red Heron, loan of Gus Marker, loan of Nick Knott and cash
- February 2, 1942: Traded Jack Church to the Brooklyn Americans for cash
- March 6, 1942: Signed Free Agent Gaye Stewart

== See also ==
- 1941–42 NHL season
