= Connie Tudin =

Canadian ice hockey player (1917–1988)

- Born: September 17, 1917; Ottawa, Ontario, Canada
- Died: October 24, 1988 (aged 71); Ottawa, Ontario, Canada
- Height: 5 ft 11 in (180 cm)
- Weight: 170 lb (77 kg; 12 st 2 lb)
- Position: Centre
- Shot: Left
- Played for: Montreal Canadiens; Harringay Racers
- Playing career: 1937–1954

Cornell Tudin (September 21, 1917 – October 24, 1988) was a Canadian ice hockey forward. He played 4 games in the National Hockey League for the Montreal Canadiens during the 1941–42 season. The rest of his career, which lasted from 1937 to 1954, was mainly spent in the minor leagues. He was born in Ottawa, Ontario.

== Career statistics ==
=== Regular season and playoffs ===
			Regular season					Playoffs
Season	Team	League	GP	G	A	Pts	PIM	GP	G	A	Pts	PIM
1936–37	Ottawa Rideaus	OCJHL	15	31	15	46	4	4	8	4	12	4
1936–37	Ottawa Rideaus	M-Cup	—	—	—	—	—	4	8	8	16	8
1937–38	Arnprior Greenshirts	UOVHL	16	18	17	35	12	3	0	2	2	0
1937–38	Arnprior Greenshirts	Al-Cup	—	—	—	—	—	4	2	8	10	2
1938–39	Harringay Racers	ENL	—	6	7	13	14	—	—	—	—	—
1939–40	Lachine Rapides	QPHL	41	27	12	39	76	9	5	4	9	10
1940–41	Montreal Senior Canadiens	QSHL	31	11	9	20	52	—	—	—	—	—
1940–41	New Haven Eagles	AHL	10	2	7	9	2	2	1	0	1	0
1941–42	Montreal Canadiens	NHL	4	0	1	1	4	—	—	—	—	—
1941–42	Washington Lions	AHL	42	9	12	21	20	2	0	0	0	0
1942–43	Ottawa RCAF Flyers	OHA Sr	17	15	14	29	19	8	4	3	7	13
1942–43	Ottawa RCAF Flyers	Al-Cup	—	—	—	—	—	7	1	2	3	6
1943–44	Arnprior RCAF	OHA Sr	7	9	12	21	10	—	—	—	—	—
1944–45	Rockcliffe RCAF	ONDHL	12	16	21	37	7	3	7	2	9	4
1944–45	Ottawa Commandos	QSHL	1	1	0	1	0	—	—	—	—	—
1945–46	Hull Volants	QSHL	25	9	22	31	2	—	—	—	—	—
1945–46	Ottawa RCAF Flyers	OCHL	10	9	8	17	—	4	2	2	4	—
1945–46	Arnprior Rams	UOVHL	4	0	2	2	4	—	—	—	—	—
1946–47	Ottawa Senators	QSHL	4	0	0	0	0	—	—	—	—	—
1946–47	Ottawa Senators	UOVHL	18	19	15	34	22	9	7	7	14	12
1947–48	Ottawa Senators	QSHL	43	24	30	54	18	12	12	11	23	6
1947–48	Ottawa Senators	Al-Cup	—	—	—	—	—	14	4	6	10	10
1948–49	Ottawa Senators	QSHL	57	22	36	58	19	11	2	4	6	4
1948–49	Ottawa Senators	Al-Cup	—	—	—	—	—	1	0	0	0	0
1949–50	Ottawa Senators	QSHL	41	10	14	24	52	7	0	1	1	4
1950–51	Ottawa Senators	QSHL	55	4	18	22	59	11	2	3	5	10
1951–52	Smiths Falls Rideaus	ECSHL	43	11	33	44	63	5	2	2	4	0
1952–53	Smiths Falls Rideaus	ECSHL	45	16	27	43	22	13	4	4	8	7
1952–53	Smiths Falls Rideaus	Al-Cup	—	—	—	—	—	11	6	4	10	8
1953–54	Brockville Magedomas	NYOHL	30	18	39	57	18	—	—	—	—	—
QSHL totals			271	85	135	220	212	41	16	19	35	24
NHL totals			4	0	1	1	4	—	—	—	—	—
