= Alan Kuntz =

Canadian ice hockey player

- Born: June 4, 1919 Toronto, Ontario, Canada
- Died: March 7, 1987 (aged 67) Ottawa, Ontario, Canada
- Height: 5 ft 9 in (175 cm)
- Weight: 165 lb (75 kg; 11 st 11 lb)
- Position: Left wing
- Shot: Left
- Played for: New York Rangers
- Playing career: 1939–1956

Alan Robert Kuntz (June 4, 1919 – March 7, 1987) was a Canadian ice hockey player. He played 45 games in the National Hockey League (NHL) with the New York Rangers during the 1941–42 and 1945–46 seasons. The rest of his career, which lasted from 1939 to 1956, was spent in the minor leagues. He was the father of former NHL player Murray Kuntz.

== Career statistics ==
=== Regular season and playoffs ===
			Regular season					Playoffs
Season	Team	League	GP	G	A	Pts	PIM	GP	G	A	Pts	PIM
1935–36	Glebe Collegiate	HS-CA	—	—	—	—	—	—	—	—	—	—
1936–37	Ottawa Junior Senators	OCJHL	4	2	1	3	0	4	0	1	1	0
1937–38	Glebe Collegiate	HS-CA	—	—	—	—	—	—	—	—	—	—
1938–39	Guelph Indians	OHA	14	9	10	19	9	2	0	2	2	2
1939–40	Washington Eagles	EAHL	41	22	27	49	2	4	1	0	1	2
1940–41	Philadelphia Ramblers	AHL	48	11	14	25	23	—	—	—	—	—
1941–42	New York Rangers	NHL	31	10	11	21	10	6	1	0	1	2
1941–42	New Haven Eagles	AHL	21	5	9	14	2	—	—	—	—	—
1942–43	Montreal Army	QSHL	32	19	21	40	36	7	1	3	4	0
1944–45	Toronto Army Shamrocks	TIHL	5	3	4	7	0	—	—	—	—	—
1944–45	Toronto Army Daggers	OHA Sr	2	1	1	2	0	—	—	—	—	—
1945–46	New York Rangers	NHL	14	0	1	1	2	—	—	—	—	—
1945–46	St. Paul Saints	USHL	39	7	9	16	24	6	2	2	4	6
1946–47	New Haven Ramblers	AHL	55	17	27	44	27	—	—	—	—	—
1947–48	Springfield Indians	AHL	62	24	34	58	22	—	—	—	—	—
1948–49	Vancouver Canucks	PCHL	62	42	38	80	14	3	1	0	1	4
1949–50	Vancouver Canucks	PCHL	70	37	46	83	33	12	2	5	7	0
1950–51	Ottawa Senators	QSHL	53	10	17	27	22	11	4	2	6	0
1951–52	Ottawa Senators	QSHL	59	25	37	62	7	7	4	6	10	0
1952–53	Ottawa Senators	QSHL	49	14	19	33	6	10	2	2	4	0
1953–54	Ottawa Senators	QSHL	62	13	19	32	9	22	2	7	9	2
1954–55	Ottawa Senators	QSHL	27	8	8	16	11	—	—	—	—	—
1954–55	Pembroke Lumber Kings	NOHA	22	11	15	26	2	6	3	2	5	0
1955–56	Brockville Magedomas	EOHL	37	4	21	25	22	2	0	0	0	14
QSHL totals			282	89	121	210	91	57	13	20	33	2
NHL totals			45	10	12	22	12	6	1	0	1	2
