= Gerald Heffernan =

Canadian ice hockey player (1916–2007)

- Heffernan, 1947 Montreal Royals
- Born: July 24, 1916 Montreal, Quebec, Canada
- Died: January 16, 2007 (aged 90) Moraga, California, United States
- Height: 5 ft 9 in (175 cm)
- Weight: 154 lb (70 kg; 11 st 0 lb)
- Position: Right wing
- Shot: Right
- Played for: Montreal Canadiens
- Playing career: 1936–1946

Gerald Joseph Heffernan (July 24, 1916 – January 16, 2007) was a Canadian ice hockey player. He played 85 games in the National Hockey League with the Montreal Canadiens from 1941 to 1944. The rest of his career, which lasted from 1936 to 1946, was spent in the minor leagues. With Montreal, he won the Stanley Cup in 1944. After retiring from hockey Gerald Heffernan became an insurance salesman and lived the rest of his years in Moraga, California.

His son, Terence Heffernan, was a Canadian screenwriter.

== Career statistics ==
=== Regular season and playoffs ===
			Regular season					Playoffs
Season	Team	League	GP	G	A	Pts	PIM	GP	G	A	Pts	PIM
1934–35	Montreal Junior Royals	QJAHA	10	8	6	14	2	2	1	0	1	2
1935–36	Montreal Junior Royals	QJAHA	9	5	3	8	2	2	3	1	4	0
1934–36	Montreal Royals	MTL Sr	—	—	—	—	—	5	0	0	0	0
1936–37	Montreal Royals	MTL Sr	21	6	15	21	12	5	2	0	2	2
1937–38	Harringay Greyhounds	ENL	—	—	—	—	—	—	—	—	—	—
1938–39	Montreal Royals	QSHL	21	12	10	22	35	5	2	8	10	8
1938–39	Montreal Royals	Al-Cup	—	—	—	—	—	15	9	13	22	14
1939–40	Montreal Royals	QSHL	29	11	19	30	38	8	4	6	10	2
1939–40	Montreal Royals	Al-Cup	—	—	—	—	—	5	1	5	6	9
1940–41	Montreal Royals	QSHL	33	15	18	33	24	8	4	3	7	2
1940–41	Montreal Royals	Al-Cup	—	—	—	—	—	14	4	4	8	6
1941–42	Montreal Canadiens	NHL	41	5	15	20	15	2	2	1	3	0
1941–42	Montreal Royals	QSHL	9	2	4	6	6	—	—	—	—	—
1942–43	Montreal Canadiens	NHL	1	0	0	0	0	2	0	0	0	0
1942–43	Montreal Shamrocks	QSHL	22	19	15	34	28	4	0	1	1	2
1943–44	Montreal Canadiens	NHL	43	28	20	48	12	7	1	2	3	8
1944–45	Montreal Royals	QSHL	23	23	28	51	14	7	4	4	8	2
1945–46	Montreal Royals	QSHL	38	20	24	44	41	11	7	6	13	4
QSHL totals			175	102	118	220	186	43	21	28	49	20
NHL totals			85	33	35	68	27	11	3	3	6	8
