= Red Hamill =

Canadian ice hockey player

- Born: January 11, 1917 Toronto, Ontario, Canada
- Died: December 16, 1985 (aged 68)
- Height: 5 ft 11 in (180 cm)
- Weight: 180 lb (82 kg; 12 st 12 lb)
- Position: Left wing
- Shot: Left
- Played for: Boston Bruins; Chicago Black Hawks
- Playing career: 1937–1951

Robert George "Red" Hamill (January 11, 1917, in Toronto, Ontario – December 16, 1985) was a professional ice hockey player who played 418 games in the National Hockey League (NHL). He played for the Chicago Black Hawks and Boston Bruins. He won the Stanley Cup in 1939 with the Boston Bruins.

Although Hamill had played parts of two previous seasons in the NHL, he did not score his first NHL goal until his third season with the Boston Bruins. It occurred on December 31, 1939, in his team's 6-1 victory over the Montreal Canadiens at Boston Garden. It was one of ten he would notch that season.

== Career statistics ==
=== Regular season and playoffs ===
			Regular season					Playoffs
Season	Team	League	GP	G	A	Pts	PIM	GP	G	A	Pts	PIM
1934–35	Toronto Young Rangers	OHA	—	—	—	—	—	—	—	—	—	—
1935–36	South Porcupine Porkies	NOJHA	—	—	—	—	—	—	—	—	—	—
1936–37	Copper Cliff Jr. Redmen	NOJHA	3	10	2	12	10	12	21	14	35	11
1936–37	Copper Cliff Redmen	NOHA	12	10	2	12	17	—	—	—	—	—
1937–38	Boston Bruins	NHL	6	0	1	1	2	—	—	—	—	—
1937–38	Providence Reds	IAHL	40	8	9	17	31	7	2	2	4	12
1938–39	Boston Bruins	NHL	6	0	1	1	0	12	0	0	0	8
1938–39	Hershey Bears	IAHL	45	12	12	24	29	—	—	—	—	—
1939–40	Boston Bruins	NHL	30	10	8	18	16	5	0	1	1	5
1939–40	Hershey Bears	IAHL	22	9	10	19	20	—	—	—	—	—
1940–41	Boston Bruins	NHL	8	0	1	1	0	—	—	—	—	—
1940–41	Hershey Bears	AHL	36	13	17	30	20	9	3	3	6	11
1941–42	Boston Bruins	NHL	9	3	6	9	2	—	—	—	—	—
1941–42	Hershey Bears	AHL	10	6	8	14	2	—	—	—	—	—
1941–42	Chicago Black Hawks	NHL	34	18	9	27	21	3	0	1	1	0
1942–43	Chicago Black Hawks	NHL	50	28	16	44	44	—	—	—	—	—
1943–44	Kingston Army	OHA Sr	14	10	16	26	28	—	—	—	—	—
1945–46	Chicago Black Hawks	NHL	38	20	17	37	23	4	1	0	1	7
1946–47	Chicago Black Hawks	NHL	60	21	19	40	12	—	—	—	—	—
1947–48	Chicago Black Hawks	NHL	60	11	13	24	18	—	—	—	—	—
1948–49	Chicago Black Hawks	NHL	57	8	4	12	16	—	—	—	—	—
1949–50	Chicago Black Hawks	NHL	59	6	2	8	6	—	—	—	—	—
1950–51	Chicago Black Hawks	NHL	2	0	0	0	0	—	—	—	—	—
1950–51	Milwaukee Sea Gulls	USHL	52	7	27	34	47	—	—	—	—	—
NHL totals			419	128	94	222	160	24	1	2	3	20

Preceded by John Mariucci	Chicago Black Hawks captain 1946–47	Succeeded by John Mariucci
