= Wilbert Hiller =

Canadian ice hockey player (1915–2005)

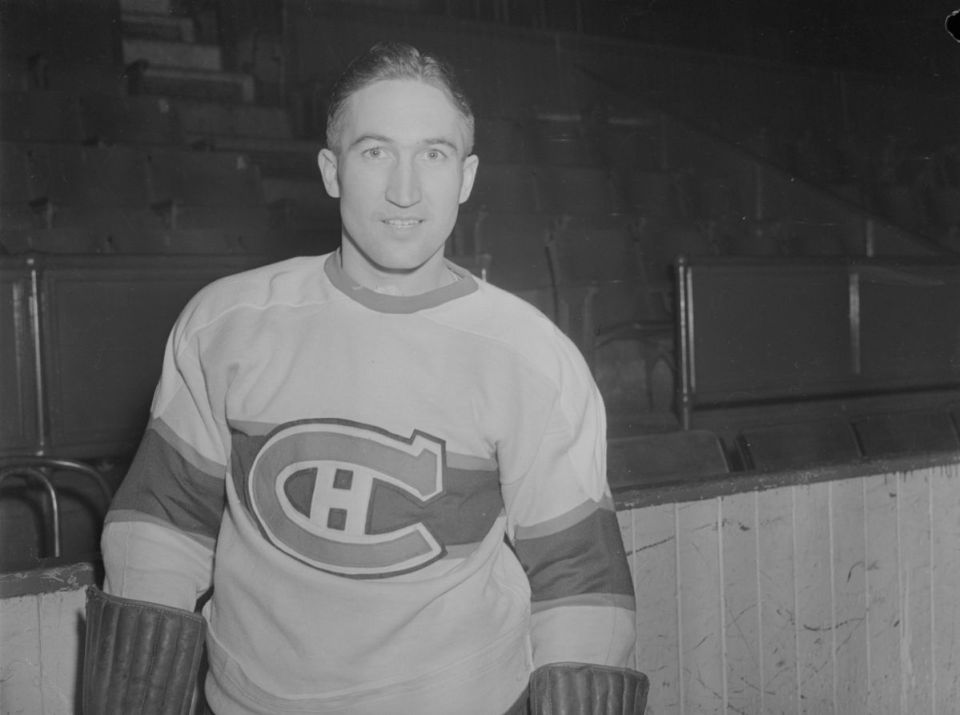
- Born: May 11, 1915 Berlin, Ontario, Canada
- Died: November 12, 2005 (aged 90) Glendale, California, USA
- Height: 5 ft 8 in (173 cm)
- Weight: 170 lb (77 kg; 12 st 2 lb)
- Position: Left wing
- Shot: Left
- Played for: Boston Bruins; Detroit Red Wings; New York Rangers; Montreal Canadiens
- Playing career: 1935–1949

Wilbert Carl "Dutch, Wib" Hiller (May 11, 1915 – November 12, 2005) was a Canadian professional ice hockey player. He played nine seasons in the National Hockey League from 1938 to 1946 with the New York Rangers, Detroit Red Wings, Boston Bruins, and Montreal Canadiens The rest of his career, which lasted from 1935 to 1949, was spent in various minor leagues, including one season in the English National League. He won the Stanley Cup twice, in 1940 with the Rangers and in 1946 with the Canadiens.

Hiller was born in Berlin, now Kitchener, Ontario on May 11, 1915. Hiller's hockey career began with stints playing for the Kitchener Empires, the Sudbury Cub Wolves and the Sudbury Frood Miners. Prior to joining the New York Rangers in for the 1938–1939 season, he played in England with the Harringay Greyhounds and the New York Rovers.

He died of congestive heart failure in 2005.

== Career statistics ==
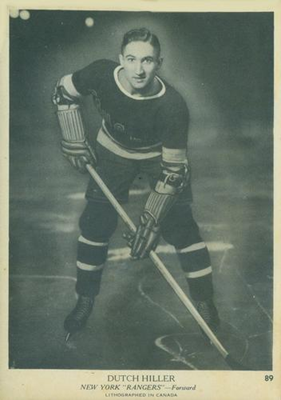
Wilbert "Dutch" Hiller for New York Rangers in 1939-40 card

=== Regular season and playoffs ===
			Regular season					Playoffs
Season	Team	League	GP	G	A	Pts	PIM	GP	G	A	Pts	PIM
1932–33	Kitchener Empires	OHA B	11	7	3	10	19	5	6	2	8	4
1933–34	Sudbury Wolf Cubs	NOJHA	8	7	0	7	15	2	5	1	6	2
1934–35	Sudbury Wolf Cubs	NOJHA	4	5	0	5	8	3	2	0	2	8
1935–36	Sudbury Frood Miners	NBHL	6	5	0	5	10	—	—	—	—	—
1935–36	Falconridge Falcons	Al-Cup	—	—	—	—	—	13	6	1	7	4
1936–37	Harringay Greyhounds	ENL	42	22	11	33	16	—	—	—	—	—
1937–38	New York Rovers	EAHL	43	26	30	56	31	—	—	—	—	—
1937–38	New York Rangers	NHL	8	0	1	1	2	1	0	0	0	0
1938–39	New York Rangers	NHL	48	10	19	29	22	7	1	0	1	9
1939–40	New York Rangers	NHL	48	13	18	31	57	12	2	4	6	2
1940–41	New York Rangers	NHL	44	8	10	18	20	3	0	0	0	0
1941–42	Detroit Red Wings	NHL	7	0	0	0	0	—	—	—	—	—
1941–42	Boston Bruins	NHL	43	7	10	17	19	5	0	1	1	0
1942–43	Boston Bruins	NHL	3	0	0	0	0	—	—	—	—	—
1942–43	Montreal Canadiens	NHL	39	8	6	14	4	5	1	0	1	4
1942–43	Washington Lions	AHL	2	0	1	1	0	—	—	—	—	—
1943–44	New York Rangers	NHL	50	18	22	40	15	—	—	—	—	—
1944–45	Montreal Canadiens	NHL	48	20	16	36	20	6	1	1	2	4
1945–46	Montreal Canadiens	NHL	45	7	11	18	4	9	4	2	6	2
1946–47	Pittsburgh Hornets	AHL	64	13	16	29	37	12	2	3	5	12
1947–48	Ayr Centennials	OHA Sr	19	15	12	27	20	9	2	4	6	8
1948–49	Los Angeles Monarchs	PCHL	—	—	—	—	—	—	—	—	—	—
NHL totals			383	91	113	204	163	48	9	8	17	21

== Awards and achievements ==
- 1940 Stanley Cup Championship (New York Rangers)
- 1946 Stanley Cup Championship (Montreal Canadiens)
- In the 2009 book 100 Ranger Greats, Hiller was ranked 73rd all-time.
