= 1941–42 NHL season =

Professional ice hockey league season

- League: National Hockey League
- Sport: Ice hockey
- Duration: November 1, 1941 – April 18, 1942
- Games: 48
- Teams: 7

Regular season
- Season champion: New York Rangers
- Season MVP: Tommy Anderson (Americans)
- Top scorer: Bryan Hextall (Rangers)

Stanley Cup
- Champions: Toronto Maple Leafs
- Runners-up: Detroit Red Wings

NHL seasons
- ← 1940–41 1942–43 →

The 1941–42 NHL season was the 25th season of the National Hockey League. Seven teams played 48 games each. The New York Americans rebranded as the Brooklyn Americans. The Toronto Maple Leafs won the Stanley Cup defeating the Detroit Red Wings, winning four straight after losing the first three in a best-of-seven series, a feat only repeated to date three times in NHL history (1975, 2010, 2014) and once in Major League Baseball (2004). However the '41–42 Leafs were the only ones to achieve the feat in a championship final series.

== League business ==
This was the last season for the Brooklyn Americans who had changed their name from the New York Americans in an attempt to build a civic relationship with those from the Flatbush area of New York. However, the team continued to play at Madison Square Garden in Manhattan since there was no suitable arena in Brooklyn.

Due to World War II travel restrictions on adults, the NHL demanded more junior-aged players who were free of the travel restrictions. NHL president Frank Calder reported there was a general agreement with the amateur leagues that a junior-aged player should be able to determine his own financial future due to the war.

== Regular season ==
The Americans started the season without Harvey "Busher" Jackson who refused to sign. He was then sold to Boston. But the Amerks had two positive notes: two defencemen, Tommy Anderson and Pat Egan, were now All-Star calibre. That did not prevent them from finishing last, though. On December 9, 1941, the Chicago Black Hawks-Boston Bruins game would be delayed for over a half-hour as United States President Franklin Delano Roosevelt declared that the United States was at war.

Frank Patrick suffered a heart attack and had to sell his interest in the Montreal Canadiens, and the Habs almost had to move to Cleveland. But Tommy Gorman kept the team alive. They added Emile "Butch" Bouchard to start his great career on defence and another very good player, Buddy O'Connor, at centre. Montreal had goaltending problems as Bert Gardiner slumped, and rookie Paul Bibeault replaced him. He showed flashes of brilliance, but his inexperience showed. Joe Benoit starred with 20 goals, the first Canadien to do that since 1938–39, when Toe Blake did it.

The New York Rangers had a new goaltender as Sugar Jim Henry replaced the retired Dave Kerr. Henry was one of the reasons the Rangers finished first, something they did not do again for the next 50 years.

=== Final standings ===
National Hockey League
	GP	W	L	T	Pts	GF	GA
**New York Rangers**	48	29	17	2	60	177	143
**Toronto Maple Leafs**	48	27	18	3	57	158	136
**Boston Bruins**	48	25	17	6	56	160	118
**Chicago Black Hawks**	48	22	23	3	47	145	155
**Detroit Red Wings**	48	19	25	4	42	140	147
**Montreal Canadiens**	48	18	27	3	39	134	173
Brooklyn Americans	48	16	29	3	35	133	175

Note: GP = Games played, W = Wins, L = Losses, T = Ties, Pts = Points, GF = Goals for, GA = Goals against
Teams that qualified for the playoffs are highlighted in bold.

== Playoffs ==
=== Playoff bracket ===
The top six teams in the league qualified for the playoffs. The top two teams played in a best-of-seven Stanley Cup semifinal series. The third-place team then met the fourth-place team in one best-of-three series, and the fifth-place team faced the sixth-place team in another best-of-three series, to determine the participants for the other best-of-three semifinal series. The semifinal winners then met in a best-of-seven Stanley Cup Finals (scores in the bracket indicate the number of games won in each series).

Quarterfinals
3	Boston	2
4	Chicago	1
5	Detroit	2
6	Montreal	1

Semifinals
1	New York	2
2	Toronto	4
3	Boston	0
5	Detroit	2

Stanley Cup Finals
2	Toronto	4
5	Detroit	3

=== Quarterfinals ===
==== (3) Boston Bruins vs. (4) Chicago Black Hawks ====
March 22	Boston Bruins	2–1	OT	Chicago Black Hawks	Chicago Stadium	Recap
Roy Conacher (1) – 11:08		First period		No scoring
No scoring		Second period		No scoring
No scoring		Third period		18:50 – Max Bentley (1)
Des Smith (1) – 06:51		First overtime period		No scoring
Frank Brimsek		Goalie stats		Sam LoPresti

March 24	Chicago Black Hawks	4–0	Boston Bruins	Boston Garden	Recap
No scoring		First period	No scoring
Bill Mosienko (1) – 03:57; Alex Kaleta (1) – 10:19; Bill Carse (1) – 10:30		Second period	No scoring
George Allen (1) – 06:27		Third period	No scoring
Sam LoPresti		Goalie stats	Frank Brimsek

March 26	Chicago Black Hawks	2–3	Boston Bruins	Boston Garden	Recap
No scoring		First period	18:01 – Gordie Bruce (1)
Max Bentley (2) – 07:09; Bill Mosienko (2) – pp – 15:26		Second period	00:48 – Gordie Bruce (2); 08:15 – Jack McGill (1)
No scoring		Third period	No scoring
Sam LoPresti		Goalie stats	Frank Brimsek

Boston won series 2–1

==== (5) Detroit Red Wings vs. (6) Montreal Canadiens ====
March 22	Montreal Canadiens	1–2	Detroit Red Wings	Olympia Stadium	Recap
No scoring		First period	11:32 – Don Grosso (1)
Terry Reardon (1) – 09:57		Second period	02:35 – Don Grosso (2)
No scoring		Third period	No scoring
Paul Bibeault		Goalie stats	Johnny Mowers

March 24	Detroit Red Wings	0–5	Montreal Canadiens	Montreal Forum	Recap
No scoring		First period	12:03 – pp – Jim Haggarty (1)
No scoring		Second period	10:26 – Terry Reardon (2); 17:20 – Butch Bouchard (1)
No scoring		Third period	15:41 – Joe Benoit (1); 16:17 – Gerry Heffernan (1)
Johnny Mowers		Goalie stats	Paul Bibeault

March 26	Montreal Canadiens	2–6	Detroit Red Wings	Olympia Stadium	Recap
No scoring		First period	No scoring
Jim Haggarty (2) – 01:26		Second period	04:21 – Mud Bruneteau (1); 19:37 – Sid Abel (1)
Gerry Heffernan (2) – 19:49		Third period	07:30 – Joe Carveth (1); 11:40 – Mud Bruneteau (2); 13:02 – Carl Liscombe (1); 19:33 – Carl Liscombe (2)
Paul Bibeault		Goalie stats	Johnny Mowers

Detroit won series 2–1

=== Semifinals ===
==== (1) New York Rangers vs. (2) Toronto Maple Leafs ====
March 21	New York Rangers	1–3	Toronto Maple Leafs	Maple Leaf Gardens	Recap
Babe Pratt (1) – 02:26		First period	04:15 – Gordie Drillon (1); 05:33 – Nick Metz (1)
No scoring		Second period	14:14 – Syl Apps (1)
No scoring		Third period	No scoring
Jim Henry		Goalie stats	Turk Broda

March 22	Toronto Maple Leafs	4–2	New York Rangers	Madison Square Garden III	Recap
John McCreedy (1) – 11:41; Gordie Drillon (2) – 19:32		First period	No scoring
No scoring		Second period	No scoring
John McCreedy (2) – 04:49; Billy Taylor (1) – 06:15		Third period	01:31 – pp – Mac Colville (1); 02:22 – pp – Mac Colville (2)
Turk Broda		Goalie stats	Jim Henry

March 24	Toronto Maple Leafs	0–3	New York Rangers	Madison Square Garden III	Recap
No scoring		First period	No scoring
No scoring		Second period	02:50 – pp – Alex Shibicky (1); 06:10 – Alan Kuntz (1)
No scoring		Third period	10:49 – Mac Colville (3)
Turk Broda		Goalie stats	Jim Henry

March 28	New York Rangers	1–2	Toronto Maple Leafs	Maple Leaf Gardens	Recap
No scoring		First period	No scoring
No scoring		Second period	No scoring
Bryan Hextall (1) – 17:32		Third period	09:09 – Syl Apps (2); 13:08 – Sweeney Schriner (1)
Jim Henry		Goalie stats	Turk Broda

March 29	Toronto Maple Leafs	1–3	New York Rangers	Madison Square Garden III	Recap
No scoring		First period	02:01 – Alex Shibicky (2); 16:07 – Alex Shibicky (3)
No scoring		Second period	No scoring
Pete Langelle (1) – 18:05		Third period	15:56 – Lynn Patrick (1)
Turk Broda		Goalie stats	Jim Henry

March 31	New York Rangers	2–3	Toronto Maple Leafs	Maple Leaf Gardens	Recap
No scoring		First period	11:41 – John McCreedy (3)
No scoring		Second period	00:50 – Pete Langelle (2)
Phil Watson (1) – 10:31; Alf Pike (1) – pp – 12:18		Third period	19:55 – Nick Metz (2)
Jim Henry		Goalie stats	Turk Broda

Toronto won series 4–2

==== (3) Boston Bruins vs. (5) Detroit Red Wings ====
March 29	Detroit Red Wings	6–4	Boston Bruins	Boston Garden	Recap
Mud Bruneteau (3) – 00:19; Eddie Wares (1) – 03:25; Carl Liscombe (3) – 10:49		First period	16:24 – Roy Conacher (2)
Don Grosso (3) – 01:00; Carl Liscombe (4) – 09:20		Second period	05:39 – Jack McGill (2)
Sid Abel (2) – 09:00		Third period	09:15 – Jack McGill (3); 16:04 – Jack McGill (4)
Johnny Mowers		Goalie stats	Frank Brimsek

March 31	Boston Bruins	1–3	Detroit Red Wings	Olympia Stadium	Recap
Herb Cain (1) – 08:32		First period	03:50 – Joe Carveth (2)
No scoring		Second period	No scoring
No scoring		Third period	09:46 – Joe Carveth (3); 19:54 – Don Grosso (4)
Frank Brimsek		Goalie stats	Johnny Mowers

Detroit won series 2–0

=== Stanley Cup Finals ===
April 4	Detroit Red Wings	3–2	Toronto Maple Leafs	Maple Leaf Gardens	Recap
Don Grosso (5) – 01:38; Sid Abel (3) – 12:30		First period	06:36 – John McCreedy (4); 12:59 – Sweeney Schriner (2)
Don Grosso (6) – 14:11		Second period	No scoring
No scoring		Third period	No scoring
Johnny Mowers		Goalie stats	Turk Broda

April 7	Detroit Red Wings	4–2	Toronto Maple Leafs	Maple Leaf Gardens	Recap
Don Grosso (7) – 11:48; Mud Bruneteau (4) – 14:17		First period	No scoring
No scoring		Second period	11:13 – Sweeney Schriner (3)
Don Grosso (8) – 04:15; Gerry Brown (1) – pp – 10:08		Third period	13:40 – Wally Stanowski (1)
Johnny Mowers		Goalie stats	Turk Broda

April 9	Toronto Maple Leafs	2–5	Detroit Red Wings	Olympia Stadium	Recap
Lorne Carr (1) – 15:36; Lorne Carr (2) – 16:06		First period	18:20 – Gerry Brown (2); 18:40 – Joe Carveth (4)
No scoring		Second period	13:12 – Pat McReavy (1); 15:11 – Syd Howe (1)
No scoring		Third period	07:11 – Eddie Bush (1)
Turk Broda		Goalie stats	Johnny Mowers

April 12	Toronto Maple Leafs	4–3	Detroit Red Wings	Olympia Stadium	Recap
No scoring		First period	No scoring
Bob Davidson (1) – 13:54; Lorne Carr (3) – 15:20		Second period	01:32 – Mud Bruneteau (5); 09:08 – Sid Abel (4)
Syl Apps (3) – 06:15; Nick Metz (3) – 12:45		Third period	04:18 – Carl Liscombe (5)
Turk Broda		Goalie stats	Johnny Mowers

April 14	Detroit Red Wings	3–9	Toronto Maple Leafs	Maple Leaf Gardens	Recap
No scoring		First period	09:29 – pp – Nick Metz (4); 15:14 – pp – Wally Stanowski (2)
No scoring		Second period	01:59 – Bob Goldham (1); 04:11 – Sweeney Schriner (4); 14:11 – Don Metz (1); 14:28 – Syl Apps (4); 16:44 – sh – Don Metz (2)
Syd Howe (2) – 03:08; Alex Motter (1) – 14:03; Carl Liscombe (6) – pp – 15:45		Third period	05:36 – Don Metz (3); 09:25 – Syl Apps (5)
Johnny Mowers		Goalie stats	Turk Broda

April 16	Toronto Maple Leafs	3–0	Detroit Red Wings	Olympia Stadium	Recap
No scoring		First period	No scoring
Don Metz (4) – 00:14		Second period	No scoring
Bob Goldham (2) – 13:32; Billy Taylor (2) – 14:04		Third period	No scoring
Turk Broda		Goalie stats	Johnny Mowers

April 18	Detroit Red Wings	1–3	Toronto Maple Leafs	Maple Leaf Gardens	Recap
No scoring		First period	No scoring
Syd Howe (3) – 01:45		Second period	No scoring
No scoring		Third period	07:47 – Sweeney Schriner (5); 09:48 – Pete Langelle (3); 16:17 – Sweeney Schriner (6)
Johnny Mowers		Goalie stats	Turk Broda

Toronto won series 4–3

== Awards ==
Award winners
Calder Trophy: (Best first-year player)	Grant Warwick, New York Rangers
Hart Trophy: (Most valuable player)	Tommy Anderson, Brooklyn Americans
Lady Byng Trophy: (Excellence and sportsmanship)	Syl Apps, Toronto Maple Leafs
O'Brien Cup: (Stanley Cup runner-up)	Detroit Red Wings
Prince of Wales Trophy: (Regular season champion)	New York Rangers
Vezina Trophy: (Fewest goals allowed)	Frank Brimsek, Boston Bruins

All-Star teams
First team	Position	Second team
Frank Brimsek, Boston Bruins	G	Turk Broda, Toronto Maple Leafs
Earl Seibert, Chicago Black Hawks	D	Pat Egan, Brooklyn Americans
Tommy Anderson, Brooklyn Americans	D	Bucko McDonald, Toronto Maple Leafs
Syl Apps, Toronto Maple Leafs	C	Phil Watson, New York Rangers
Bryan Hextall, New York Rangers	RW	Gordie Drillon, Toronto Maple Leafs
Lynn Patrick, New York Rangers	LW	Sid Abel, Detroit Red Wings
Frank Boucher, New York Rangers	Coach	Paul Thompson, Chicago Black Hawks

== Player statistics ==
=== Scoring leaders ===
Note: GP = Games played, G = Goals, A = Assists, PTS = Points, PIM = Penalties in minutes

PLAYER	TEAM	GP	G	A	PTS	PIM
Bryan Hextall	New York Rangers	48	24	32	56	30
Lynn Patrick	New York Rangers	47	32	22	54	18
Don Grosso	Detroit Red Wings	45	23	30	53	13
Phil Watson	New York Rangers	48	15	37	52	58
Sid Abel	Detroit Red Wings	48	18	31	49	45
Toe Blake	Montreal Canadiens	48	17	28	45	29
Bill Thoms	Chicago Black Hawks	47	15	30	45	8
Gordie Drillon	Toronto Maple Leafs	48	23	18	41	6
Syl Apps	Toronto Maple Leafs	38	18	23	41	0
Tommy Anderson	Brooklyn Americans	48	12	29	41	64

Source: NHL

=== Leading goaltenders ===
Note: GP = Games played; Mins – Minutes Played; GA = Goals against; GAA = Goals against average; W = Wins; L = Losses; T = Ties; SO = Shutouts

Player	Team	GP	Min	GA	GAA	W	L	T	SO
Frank Brimsek	Boston Bruins	47	2930	115	2.35	24	17	6	3
Turk Broda	Toronto Maple Leafs	48	2960	136	2.76	27	18	3	6
Jim Henry	New York Rangers	48	2960	143	2.90	29	17	2	1
Johnny Mowers	Detroit Red Wings	47	2880	144	3.00	19	25	3	5
Sam LoPresti	Chicago Black Hawks	47	2860	152	3.19	21	23	3	3
Paul Bibeault	Montreal Canadiens	38	2380	131	3.30	17	19	2	1
Chuck Rayner	Brooklyn Americans	36	2380	129	3.47	13	21	2	1
Earl Robertson	Brooklyn Americans	12	750	46	3.68	3	8	1	0
Bert Gardiner	Montreal Canadiens	10	620	42	4.06	1	8	1	0

== Coaches ==
- Boston Bruins: Art Ross
- Brooklyn Americans: Red Dutton
- Chicago Black Hawks: Paul Thompson
- Detroit Red Wings: Jack Adams
- Montreal Canadiens: Dick Irvin
- New York Rangers: Frank Boucher
- Toronto Maple Leafs: Hap Day

== Debuts ==
The following is a list of players of note who played their first NHL game in 1941–42 (listed with their first team, asterisk(*) marks debut in playoffs):

- Kenny Mosdell, Brooklyn Americans
- Harry Watson, Brooklyn Americans
- Bill Mosienko, Chicago Black Hawks
- Adam Brown, Detroit Red Wings
- Buddy O'Connor, Montreal Canadiens
- James Haggarty, Montreal Canadiens
- Emile "Butch" Bouchard, Montreal Canadiens
- Grant Warwick, New York Rangers
- Jim Henry, New York Rangers
- Bob Goldham, Toronto Maple Leafs
- Gaye Stewart*, Toronto Maple Leafs

== Last games ==
The following is a list of players of note that played their last game in the NHL in 1941–42 (listed with their last team):

- Eddie Wiseman, Boston Bruins
- Tommy Anderson, Brooklyn Americans
- Art Coulter, New York Rangers
- Pete Langelle, Toronto Maple Leafs

== See also ==
- 1941–42 NHL transactions
- List of Stanley Cup champions
- 1941 in sports
- 1942 in sports
