= History of the Toronto Maple Leafs =

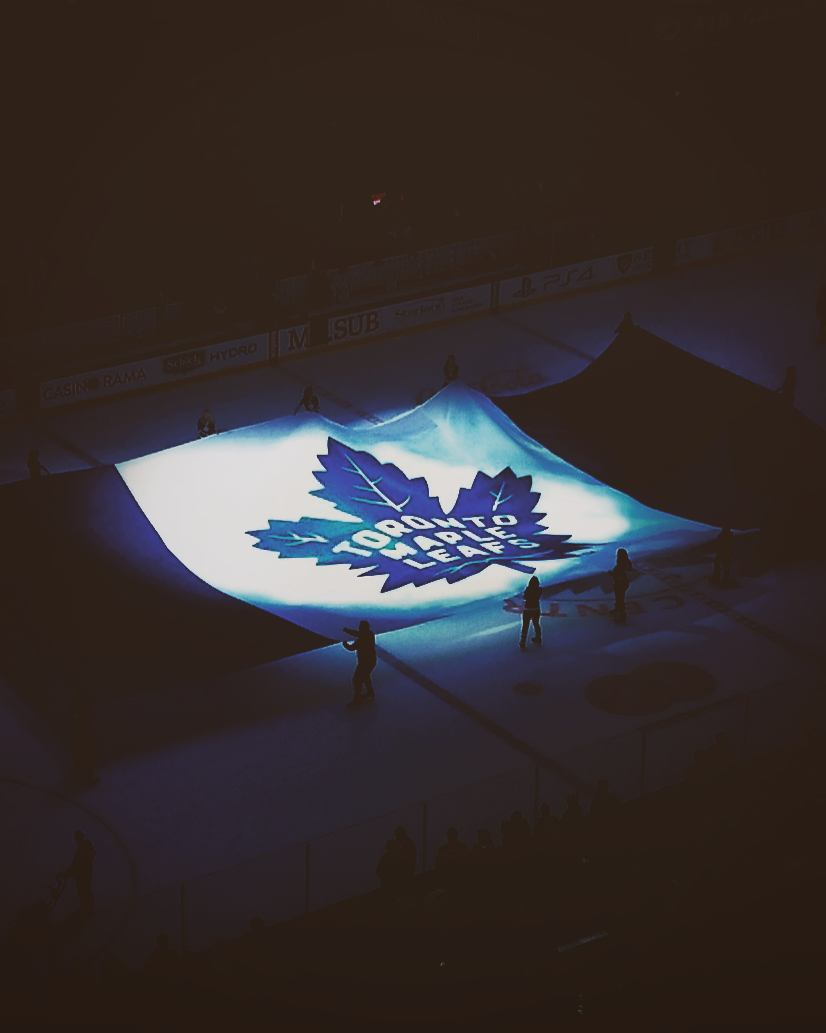
A Toronto Maple Leafs flag unfurled on the ice for the home opener of the 101st NHL season.

The history of the Toronto Maple Leafs, a professional ice hockey team in the National Hockey League (NHL), begins with the establishment of the NHL itself. Both the Toronto Maple Leafs and the NHL arose from disputes between Eddie Livingstone, owner of the National Hockey Association's Toronto Blueshirts, and the other team owners of the Association. In November 1917, these other team owners founded the NHL and granted Toronto a temporary franchise in their new league. Playing at Arena Gardens, this temporary team, the Toronto Arenas, won the 1918 Stanley Cup Final following the inaugural 1917–18 NHL season. The NHL made the franchise permanent in October 1918.

In 1919, the club was sold to the St. Patrick Hockey Club, who renamed the franchise the Toronto St. Patricks. Although the St. Patricks won one Stanley Cup in 1922, they were again put up for sale due following a series of litigations from Livingstone. The franchise was eventually sold to Conn Smythe in 1927, who immediately renamed the team the Toronto Maple Leafs (formally the Toronto Maple Leaf Hockey Club). In an effort to finance the construction of Maple Leaf Gardens, Smythe launched Maple Leaf Gardens Limited (MLGL, renamed Maple Leafs Sports & Entertainment in 1998), a publicly traded management company to own both the Maple Leafs and the planned arena. The Maple Leafs played their first game at Maple Leaf Gardens in November 1931. For most of the 1930s, the team was led by The Kid Line. Led by this line, the Maple Leafs won the 1932 Stanley Cup and made six more Stanley Cup Final appearances in the following eight seasons.

As a result of the Great Depression, a number of NHL franchises financially struggled, suspended operations, or folded. By the 1942–43 season, the Maple Leafs were one of six remaining teams in the league. The Maple Leafs saw tremendous success during the early "Original Six" era (lasting until the 1966–67 season), winning the Stanley Cup in 1942, 1945, 1947, 1948 and 1949. Following the Maple Leafs 1951 Stanley Cup victory, the team saw an 11-year championship drought. Prior to the 1961–62 NHL season, Conn Smythe sold nearly all of his shares in MLGL to a partnership made up of his son, Stafford Smythe, John W. H. Bassett, and Harold Ballard. The Maple Leafs found new success during the 1960s, winning the Stanley Cup in 1962, 1963, 1964 and 1967. Winning their last championship in Centennial Year prior to the 1967 NHL expansion; the Maple Leafs' drought between Stanley Cups is the longest active drought in the NHL.

In 1971, Ballard secured principal ownership of MLGL. During the 1970s, the Maple Leafs saw some success, only failing to qualify for the playoffs once in the decade. However, the Maple Leafs would fail to post a winning record for 12 years, from 1980–81 to 1992–93. During the 1990s and early 2000s, the team saw a resurgence in competitive play, missing the playoffs only twice from 1993 to 2004. In February 1999, the Maple Leafs moved from Maple Leaf Gardens, to their new home arena, the Air Canada Centre. Following the 2004–05 NHL lockout, the Maple Leafs saw a seven-year playoff drought, failing to qualify for the playoffs from the 2006 to 2012 Stanley Cup playoffs. In August 2012, BCE Inc. and Rogers Communications completed the purchase for a combined 70 per cent stake in MLSE. Shortly after the end of the 2013–14 season, Brendan Shanahan was appointed the president and alternate governor of the hockey club.

== Early years (1917–1928) ==
The beginnings of the Maple Leafs NHL franchise arose out of a long-running dispute between Eddie Livingstone, owner of the National Hockey Association's Toronto Blueshirts, and his fellow NHA owners, particularly Sam Lichtenhein of the Montreal Wanderers. Tempers boiled over when the NHA added a second Toronto team in 1916–17, representing the 228th Battalion of the Canadian army. The 228th was forced to withdraw its team in mid-season when the unit was called overseas. That left the NHA with an odd number of teams, and the team owners—at a meeting that did not include Livingstone—decided to even-up the number of teams by suspending operations of the Torontos for the rest of the season. All players were given to other NHA teams for the rest of the season. At the time, the plan was to return the players to the Toronto franchise, but the rest of the league wanted Livingstone out. At the end of the season Toronto was reinstated, with the condition that the club was to be sold within 60 days. However, Livingstone turned down several offers and obtained a court order to prevent the sale.

By the fall of 1917, the owners of the NHA's other four clubs—the Montreal Canadiens, Montreal Wanderers, Ottawa Senators, and Quebec Bulldogs—were eager to disassociate themselves from Livingstone. On October 19, a meeting of the NHA board of directors was held. Livingstone did not attend, sending lawyer Eddie Barclay. Barclay was informed by the directors that Toronto would not be permitted to play in the 1917–18 season due to the difficulty of operating a five-team league, both in scheduling and availability of players during wartime. However, the NHA's constitution didn't allow the other teams to simply vote Livingstone out. Livingstone responded by publicly announcing that he would set up an international circuit and raid the NHA players.

On November 9, 1917, it was reported that the Toronto NHA franchise had been sold to Charles Querrie of the Toronto Arena corporation. At this point, NHA president Robertson and secretary Frank Calder denied that the NHA would change, dissolve or adopt other subterfuge. This sale never completed.

At the November 10, 1917 annual meeting of the NHA Livingstone was represented by J. F. Boland, who stated that if the league operated that the Toronto franchise intended to be a full member. The NHA voted to suspend operations for the 1917–18 season but not wind up the organization, and meet in one year's time. Efforts began immediately by the NHA clubs to form a new four-team replacement league. However, Livingstone was not invited to join them. While the Ottawa and two Montreal clubs were committed to playing, Quebec's status was unclear. If Quebec, which had run into financial trouble, could not play then a new temporary Toronto franchise would be granted to balance the schedule with a fourth team.

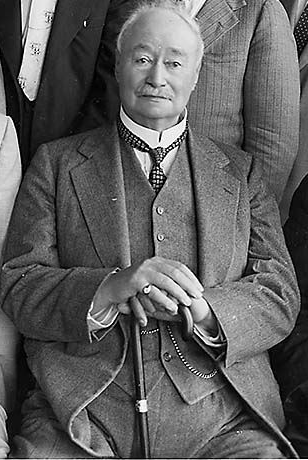
Henry Pellatt fronted an ownership group that operated the Arena Gardens. In 1917, his group was awarded a franchise from the NHL.

On November 26, 1917, representatives of the Ottawa, Quebec, and Montreal NHA clubs met at the Windsor Hotel in Montreal. The decision to start a new league, called the National Hockey League, was finalized and announced. The Quebec franchise was suspended and a franchise for Toronto was granted to the Arena Gardens of Toronto, Limited, an ownership group fronted by Henry Pellatt that owned and managed the Arena Gardens where the Blueshirts had played. The Toronto franchise was intended to be 'temporary' for only for the inaugural season, with the NHL instructing the company to resolve the dispute with Livingstone, which included litigation between Livingstone and the NHL, or transfer ownership of the Toronto franchise back to the League at the end of the season. The team was loaned the Blueshirts' players for the season.

This effectively left Livingstone in a one-team league. On paper, the NHL clubs also remained members of the NHA and were able to vote down Livingstone's attempts to keep that league operating. Frank Calder gave the Arena Company was given a year to resolve the dispute or lose the temporary franchise. The Arena Company did agree to compensate Livingstone for the use of the players for the season, although no suitable figure was ever reached, and the league itself disputed any claims that Livingstone had on the players.

=== Toronto Arenas (1917–1919) ===
The Toronto NHA franchise did not have an official name during the NHL's inaugural season in 1917–18, but was still unofficially called "the Blueshirts" and "the Torontos" by the newspapers of the day, as well as by some fans. Although the roster was composed mainly of former Blueshirts, the Maple Leafs do not claim the Blueshirts' history as their own, unlike the other two NHL franchises with NHA roots, the Canadiens and the Senators. This is because NHL was formed to remove Livingstone from the NHA and that franchise was folded. As a result, the Maple Leafs could not legally claim the Blueshirts' legacy.

Under manager Charles Querrie and coach Dick Carroll, the Toronto team won the Stanley Cup that season. The dispute with Livingston included a disagreement regarding the distribution of revenues from the Toronto Stanley Cup games in 1917, resulting in the Toronto club not engraving their name on the Cup to memorialize their series victory at the time. In 1948, the NHL engraved "1918 Toronto Arenas" on the Cup, using the official nickname of the closely related 1918–19 Toronto franchise.

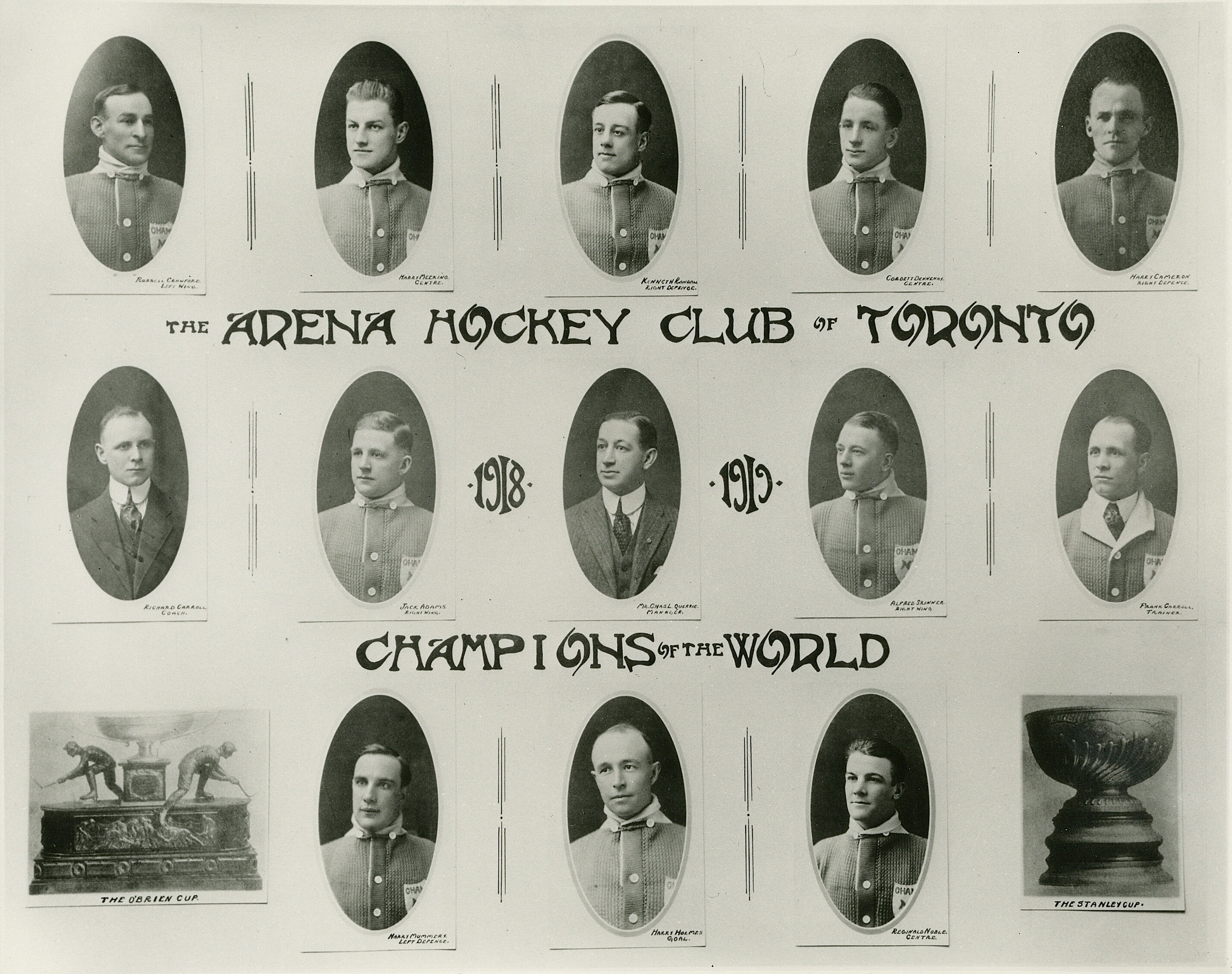
Team photo for the Toronto Arenas during the NHL's inaugural season in 1917–18.

Since the Torontos had won the Cup, even more revenue was at stake. The team was estimated now to be worth CA$20,000 (equivalent to $368,989 in 2025), and Livingstone demanded that as compensation. The Arena offered $7,000. This led to Livingstone filing another lawsuit, this against the Arena Company and Querrie for the $20,000. A league meeting of the old NHA proved futile, as heated arguments broke out between Livingstone and the other owners. The old NHA was disbanded, in spite of objections from Livingstone, and the other owners made plans to operate the NHL for a second season. However, George Kennedy gave some ground, saying that if Livingstone dropped his lawsuits, he might be allowed in the league. In the meantime, instead of returning the players to Livingstone or paying Livingstone, the Arena Company requested on October 19, 1918, that it be granted a permanent franchise, with Querrie and Arena Gardens treasurer Hubert Vearncombe as nominal owners. The new club, the Toronto Arena Hockey Club, popularly known as the Toronto Arenas, was an independent from the Arena Company's corporate structure, and thus was separated from the Livingstone lawsuits, though the franchise still used Livingstone's players without permission. At the same time, the Arena Company board decided that only NHL teams would be allowed to play at the Arena Gardens, effectively foreclosing Livingstone's efforts to resurrect the NHA. Livingstone and Percy Quinn, who owned the suspended Quebec Bulldogs of the NHA/NHL, unsuccessfully attempted to launch a competing Canadian Hockey Association (CHA)., with Quinn planning to relocate the Quebec club to Toronto as the "Shamrocks".

Mounting legal bills from the dispute forced the Arenas to sell most of their stars, resulting in a horrendous five-win season in 1918–19. With the club losing money and no hope of catching Ottawa and Montreal in the standings in a three-team league, they requested permission to suspend operations for the season in late February 1919. League president Frank Calder persuaded the team to play its 18th game on February 20, after which the league ended the regular season prematurely (shortening the 20 game schedule) and immediately proceeded to the playoffs. The Arenas' .278 winning percentage that season is still the worst in franchise history. However, since the 1919 Stanley Cup Final ended without a winner, the Arenas proclaimed themselves world champions by default.

Livingstone's suit dragged through the courts for nearly a decade. In October 1923, a ruling was made that Arena Gardens had abused its position as a trustee of the assets of the Toronto Hockey Club—its player contracts—and finding damages of CA$100,000 (equivalent to $1,784,783 in 2025) in favour of Livingstone. That still was not the end, as the damages were later reduced to $10,000 and that decision was also appealed—all the way to the privy council, which dismissed the appeal in July 1926.

=== Toronto St. Patricks (1919–1927) ===
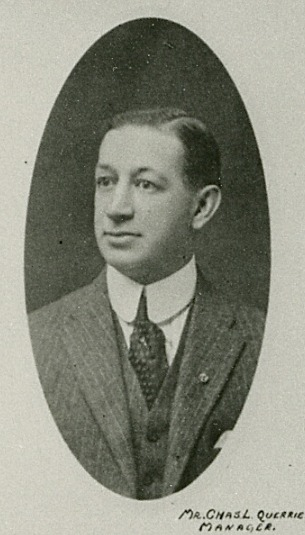
When the Arena Company declared bankruptcy, Charles Querrie, the team's first general manager, helped orchestrate the sale of the club to the St. Patricks Hockey Club.

In 1919, Livingstone won a $20,000 judgement against the Arena Company, which promptly declared bankruptcy to avoid paying. General manager Charlie Querrie learned that the Arena Company wanted to sell. As an interim measure, Querrie changed the team name to the Tecumsehs on December 7, 1919, the name of a previous Toronto franchise in the NHA. The following day, Querrie reached agreement with the owners of the amateur St. Patrick's club of the Ontario Hockey Association to purchase the franchise, allowing him to maintain an ownership stake in the team. The NHL approved the sale on December 13, 1919. The group paid $5,000 to the NHL for the franchise. While the money was to go to Livingstone to compensate him for the loss of his NHA club, Livingstone never received the money. By all accounts, Calder pocketed the money himself. The incorporation date of the club was December 22, 1919. Querrie, Fred Hambly, Percy Hambly, and Paul Ciceri owned 99 shares each, while Richard Greer owned four shares. The new owners renamed the team the Toronto St. Patricks (or St. Pats for short), and changed the team's colours from blue to green.

Among the officers of the St. Patrick's Professional Hockey Club Ltd. at the start of the 1919–20 season were president Fred Hambly, vice-president Paul Ciceri, secretary-treasurer Harvey Sproule, Charlie Querrie, and player-coach Frank Heffernan. The jersey colour was changed from blue to green.

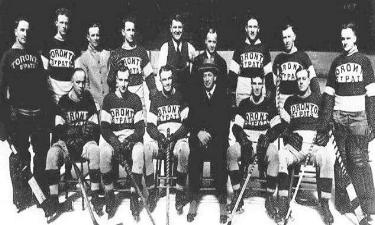
Team photo of the 1922 Toronto St. Patricks championship team.

The 1921–22 NHL season led to the St. Pat's only Stanley Cup win. The team finished second to the Ottawa Senators, but caught fire in the playoffs. The St. Pats defeated the Senators in a two-game total goals series 5–4. The team then traveled to Vancouver to take on the Millionaires, winning the series 3–2 and the Cup. (see 1922 Stanley Cup Final). The team was led by Babe Dye who scored 11 goals in the seven playoff games, and John Ross Roach who had two shutouts.

In 1924 Jack Bickell invested $25,000 in the St. Pats as a favour to his friend Querrie, who needed to financially reorganize his hockey team.

The next two seasons the St. Pats did not make the playoffs, but qualified second in 1924–25, which had expanded the number of qualifiers to three as the Maroons and Bruins joined as expansion franchises. This meant a playoff with the Canadiens with the winner to play the Hamilton Tigers, the regular season champion. The St. Pats were defeated in what turned out to be the league finals as the Tigers were suspended. The next two seasons the St. Pats did not make the playoffs.

During the mid-1920s, the St. Pats allowed other teams to use the Mutual Street Arena in the early and late months of the season, when it was usually too warm for proper ice. The Arena was the only facility east of Manitoba with artificial ice.

== Conn Smythe era (1927–1961) ==
Querrie lost a lawsuit to Livingstone over the ownership of the franchise and decided to put the St. Pats up for sale. He reached an agreement in principle to sell them to C. C. Pyle for $200,000, who planned to move the team to Philadelphia. After Bickell contacted Conn Smythe to inform him of the sale, Smythe persuaded Querrie that civic pride was more important than money and put together a syndicate that bought the St. Pats. Smythe himself invested $10,000 of his own money and his group contributed $75,000 up front and a further $75,000 due 30 days later, with Bickell retaining his $40,000 share in the team.

After taking control on Valentine's Day 1927, Smythe immediately renamed the team the Maple Leafs. (The Toronto Maple Leafs baseball team had won the International League championship a few months earlier and had been using that name for 30 years.) There have been numerous reasons cited for Smythe's decision to rename the team. The Maple Leafs say that the name was chosen in honour of the Maple Leaf Regiment from World War I. Another story says that Smythe named the team after a team he'd once scouted, called the East Toronto Maple Leafs.

Smythe's name was initially kept in the background, even though he was the largest shareholder. When the newly renamed Toronto Maple Leaf Hockey Club Ltd. promoted a public share offering to raise capital, it only disclosed that "one of the most prominent hockey coaches in Toronto" would be taking over management of the club. That prominent coach turned out to be Smythe, who replaced Querrie as the team's governor and installed himself as general manager. He would be the face of the franchise for the next 34 years, though he would not buy controlling interest until 1947.

Initial reports were that the team's colours would be changed to red and white, but the Leafs were wearing white sweaters with a green maple leaf for their first game on February 17, 1927. On September 27, 1927, it was announced that the Leafs had changed their colour scheme to blue and white, which they have worn ever since. While the Leafs say that blue represents the Canadian skies and white represents snow, it is also true that top-level Toronto teams have worn blue since the Toronto Argonauts adopted blue as their primary colour in 1873. Another theory is that Smythe changed the colours as a nod to his high school alma mater, Upper Canada College, whose teams have worn blue and white since 1829 and the University of Toronto whose teams have also worn blue and were called the Varsity Blues.

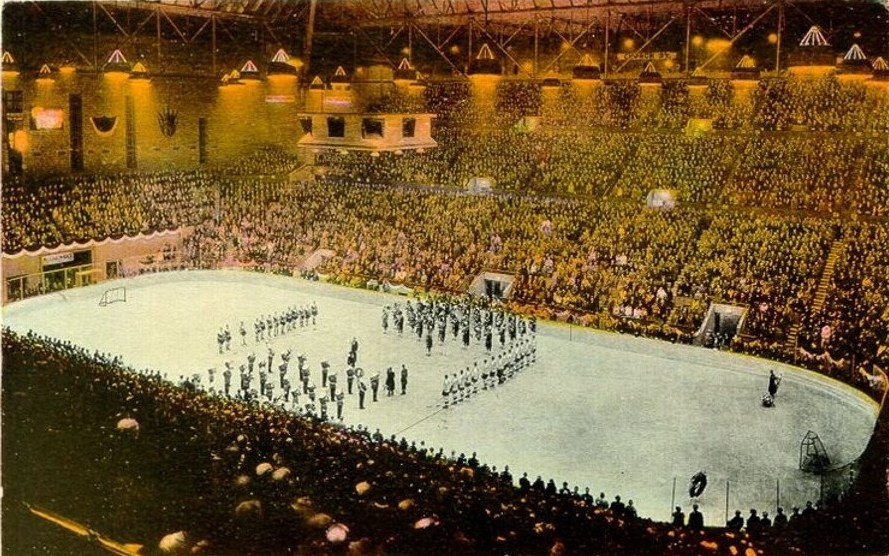
Ceremonies for the opening of Maple Leaf Gardens, prior to a game between the Maple Leafs and the Chicago Black Hawks.

After four more lacklustre seasons (including three with Smythe as coach), Smythe saw the increasing popularity of the team, and the need for a new arena. Finding an adequate number of financiers, he purchased land from the Eaton family, and construction of the arena was completed in five months. The Leafs debuted their new arena, Maple Leaf Gardens, with a 2–1 loss to the Chicago Black Hawks on November 12, 1931. Led by the "Kid Line" (Busher Jackson, Joe Primeau and Charlie Conacher) and coach Dick Irvin, the Leafs would capture their third Stanley Cup victory during the first season in their new home. They would go the distance in 1932, vanquishing Charlie Conacher's older brother Lionel Conacher and his Montreal Maroons in the first round, then in the semi-finals against the Boston Bruins, winning in the sixth overtime of the final game, and would not be overwhelmed in the Stanley Cup Final by the hated New York Rangers. Smythe took particular pleasure in defeating the Rangers that year; he had been tapped as the Rangers' first general manager and coach in their inaugural season (1926–27), but had been fired in a dispute with Madison Square Garden management. The Leafs made the Stanley Cup Final again the next season, only to be upended by the Rangers.

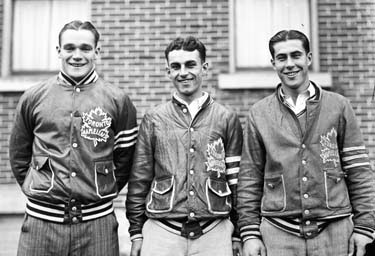
The Kid Line consisted of Charlie Conacher, Joe Primeau, and Busher Jackson (left to right). They led the Leafs to win the 1932 Stanley Cup, as well as four more Stanley Cup Final appearances over the next six years.

The Leafs' star forward, Ace Bailey, was nearly killed in 1933 when Bruins defenceman Eddie Shore checked him from behind into the boards at full speed. Maple Leafs defenceman Red Horner was able to knock Shore out with a punch, but it was too late for Bailey, who was by now writhing on the ice, had his career ended. Undeterred, the Leafs would reach the finals five more times in the next seven years but would not win, bowing out to the now-defunct Maroons in 1935, the Detroit Red Wings in 1936, the Black Hawks in 1938, the Bruins in 1939, and the Rangers in 1940. After the 1940 loss, Smythe talked the moribund Canadiens into hiring Irvin as coach; Irvin was replaced in Toronto by former Leafs captain Hap Day.

Toronto looked sure to suffer a similar fate in 1942, down three games to none in a best-of-seven Finals in 1942 against Detroit. However, fourth-line forward Don Metz would galvanize the team, coming from nowhere to score a hat trick in game four and the game-winning goal in game five, with the Leafs winning both times. Captain Syl Apps had won the Lady Byng Memorial Trophy that season, not taking one penalty and finishing his ten-season career with an average of 5 minutes, 36 seconds in penalties a season. Goalie Turk Broda would shut out the Red Wings in game six, and Sweeney Schriner scored two goals in the third period to win the seventh game 3–1 and the Stanley Cup. As of 2024, the Leafs are the only team to come back from trailing three games to none in the Stanley Cup Final.

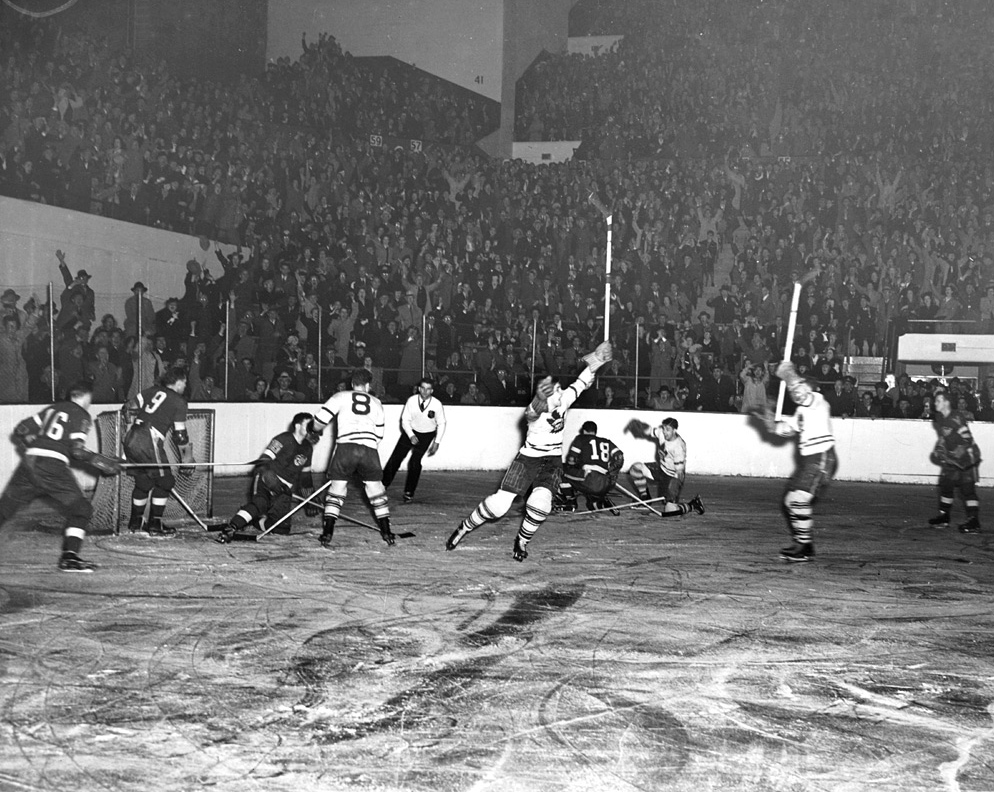
The Maple Leafs score against Detroit during the 1942 Cup Finals. Down three games to none in the best-of-seven series, the Leafs won the next four games, performing the only reverse-sweep in the Cup Finals.

Apps told writer Trent Frayne in 1949, "If you want me to be pinned down to my [biggest night in hockey but also my] biggest second, I'd say it was the last tick of the clock that sounded the final bell. It's something I shall never forget at all." It was the first time a major pro sports team came back from behind 3–0 to win a best-of-seven championship series.

Three years later, with their heroes from 1942 dwindling (due to either age, health, or the war), the Leafs turned to lesser-known players like rookie goalie Frank McCool and defenceman Babe Pratt. They would upset the Red Wings in the 1945 finals. In the 1946-47 NHL season, Maple Leaf Gardens was the first arena in the NHL to have Plexiglas inserted in the end zones of the rink.

The powerful defending champion Montreal Canadiens and their "Punch Line" (Maurice "Rocket" Richard, Toe Blake and Elmer Lach) would be the Leafs' nemesis two years later when the two teams clashed in the 1947 finals. Ted "Teeder" Kennedy would score the game-winning goal late in game six to win the Leafs their first of three straight Cups — the first time any NHL team had accomplished that feat. With their Cup victory in 1948, the Leafs moved ahead of Montreal for the most Stanley Cups in franchise history. It would take the Canadiens 10 years to reclaim the record.

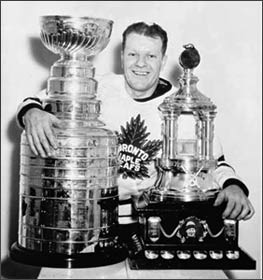
Turk Broda with the Stanley Cup and Vezina Trophy after the 1948 Finals.

The Maple Leafs and Canadiens met again in the 1951 finals, with five consecutive overtime games played in the series. Defenceman Bill Barilko managed to score the series-winning goal in overtime, leaving his defensive position (in spite of coach Joe Primeau's instructions not to) to pick up an errant pass and score. Barilko helped the club secure its fourth Stanley Cup in five years. His glory was short-lived, as he disappeared in a plane crash near Timmins, Ontario, four months later. The crash site was not found until a helicopter pilot discovered the plane's wreckage plane about 80 kilometres (50 mi) north of Cochrane, Ontario eleven years later. The Leafs did not win another Cup during the 1950s, with rumours swirling that the team was "cursed", and would not win a cup until Barilko's body was found. The "curse" came to an end after the Leafs' 1962 Stanley Cup victory, which came six weeks before to the discovery of the wreckage of Barilko's plane.

Their 1951 victory was followed by lacklustre performances in the following seasons. The team finished third in the 1951–52 season, and were eventually swept by the Red Wings in the semi-finals. With the conclusion of the 1952–53 regular season, the Leafs failed to make it to the post-season for the first time since the 1945–46 playoffs. The Leafs' poor performance may be attributed partly to a decline in their sponsored junior system (including the Toronto St. Michael's Majors and the Toronto Marlboros). The junior system was managed by Frank J. Selke until his departure to the Canadiens in 1946. In his absence, the quality of players it produced declined. Many who were called up to the Leafs in the early 1950s were found to be seriously lacking in ability. It was only later in the decade that the Leafs' feeder clubs produced prospects that helped them become competitive again.

After a two-year drought from the playoffs, the Maple Leafs clinched a berth after the 1958–59 season. Under Punch Imlach, their new general manager and coach, the Leafs made it to the 1959 Final, losing to the Canadiens in five games. Building on a successful playoff run, the Leafs followed up with a second-place finish in the 1959–60 regular season. Although they advanced to their second straight Cup Finals, the Leafs were again defeated by the Canadiens in four games.

== New owners, new dynasty (1961–1972) ==
Toronto was unable to match up with their Cup-winning teams of the 1940s and 1951 for a long time, and stronger teams like Detroit and Montreal won the Cup year after year. In fact, the Habs' 1950s dynasty closed with a last-round Maple Leaf sweep. They did not win another Stanley Cup until 1962.

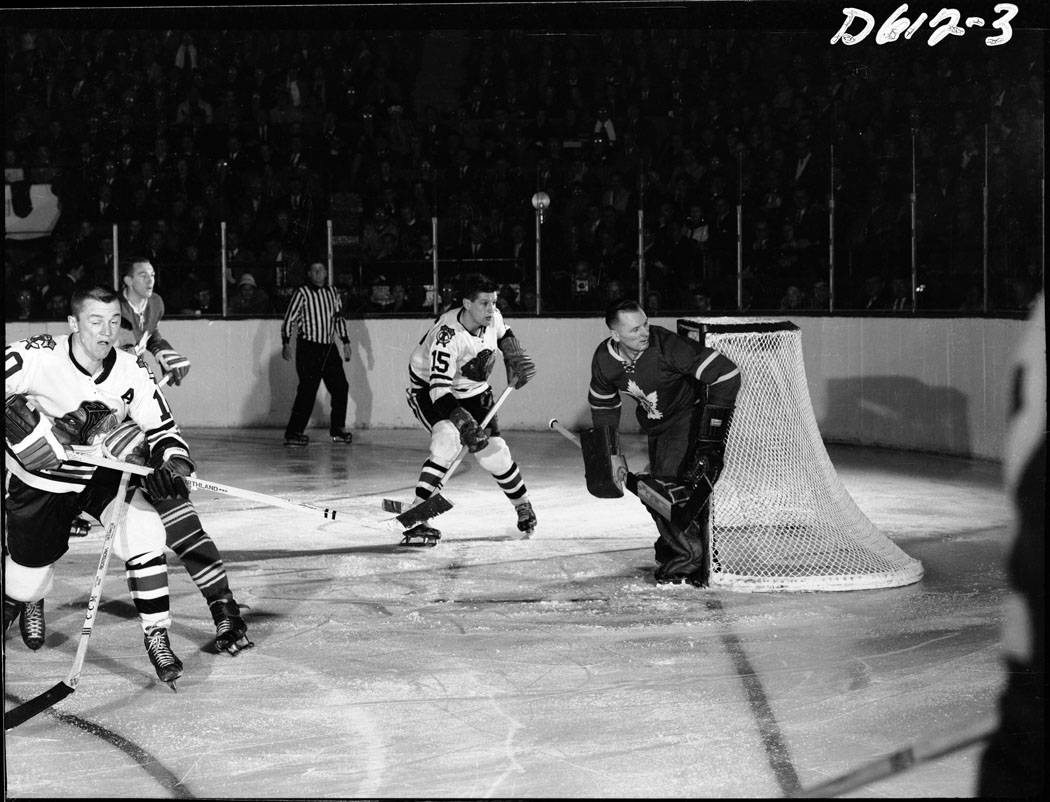
Johnny Bower (in net) during a game against the Black Hawks. Bower was the Maple Leafs' goaltender from 1958 to 1969. He helped the team win four Cups.

Before the 1961–62 season, Smythe sold nearly all of his shares in Maple Leaf Gardens to a partnership of his son Stafford Smythe, newspaper baron John W. H. Bassett and Toronto Marlboros president Harold Ballard. The sale price was $2.3 million—a handsome return on his original investment 34 years earlier. According to Stafford's son Thomas, Conn Smythe said years later that he expected to sell his shares only to his son and would not have sold his shares to the partnership. However, it is not likely that Conn Smythe could have believed that Stafford could have raised the money needed to make the deal on his own. This purchase gave the three control of about 60% ownership of the Leafs and Gardens.

And then, Toronto was able to reel off another three straight Stanley Cup victories from 1962 to 1964, with the help of Hall of Famers Frank Mahovlich, Red Kelly, Johnny Bower, Dave Keon, Andy Bathgate and Tim Horton, and under the leadership of coach and general manager Punch Imlach. However, Bathgate claimed after 1964–65 that all the autocratic Imlach said to himself and Mahovlich was insulting:

Imlach never spoke to Frank Mahovlich or myself for most of the season, and when he did, it was to criticize. Frank usually got the worst. We are athletes, not machines, and Frank is the type that needs some encouragement, a pat on the shoulder every so often.

It was Bathgate's one-way ticket to the floundering Red Wings, but Toronto would, for a few more years, keep "The Big M."

In 1967, the Leafs and Canadiens met in the Cup Final for the last time. Montreal was considered to be a heavy favourite as analysts said that the Leafs were just a bunch of has-beens. But Bob Pulford scored the double-overtime winner in game three, Jim Pappin got the series winner in game six, and Keon won the Conn Smythe Trophy as Most Valuable Player of the playoffs as the Maple Leafs won the Stanley Cup in six games. The Leafs have not won the Stanley Cup or even reached the final since.

The next two seasons saw a great deal of turnover, engineered by Imlach, who detested the new Players' Association headed by Maple Leaf players. Bobby Baun and Kent Douglas were left unprotected in the expansion draft. They missed the playoffs altogether in 1968, after which Mahovlich was traded to Detroit in a blockbuster trade. They returned to the playoffs in 1969, but a disastrous first-round sweep by the Bruins, Smythe fired Imlach.

== Ballard years (1972–1990) ==
Following Stafford Smythe's death, Harold Ballard bought Stafford Smythe's shares, taking control of the team as of February 1972, under terms of Stafford Smythe's will, allowing each partner to buy the other's shares upon their death. Stafford Smythe's brother Hugh also sold his shares to Ballard, ending the Smythe family's 45-year involvement in the NHL. Stafford Smythe's son Thomas alleges that Ballard wrote the will to his advantage.

One of the most detested owners in NHL history, he traded away many of the team's most popular players. He also blocked Keon from signing with another NHL team when his contract ran out in 1975, forcing him to jump to the Minnesota Fighting Saints of the World Hockey Association. Ballard assumed (correctly) that the Leafs would continue to sell out regardless of the team's on-ice quality, and refused to raise the payroll any higher than necessary to be profitable.

During the 1970s, with the overall level of talent in the league diluted by the addition of 12 new franchises and the rival WHA, the Leafs, led by a group of stars such as Darryl Sittler, Lanny McDonald, enforcer Tiger Williams, Ian Turnbull and Borje Salming were able to ice competitive teams for several seasons. On February 7, 1976, Sittler would score six goals and four assists against the Bruins to establish an NHL single-game record that still stands more than 30 years later. On February 2, 1977, Toronto Maple Leafs defenceman Ian Turnbull would be the first player in NHL history to score five goals on five shots. Despite the performances, the Leafs were not able to qualify for the Stanley Cup Final. They only once made it past the second round of the playoffs, besting the New York Islanders, a soon-to-be dynasty, in the 1978 quarter-finals, only to be swept by their arch-rivals the Montreal Canadiens, in the semi-finals.

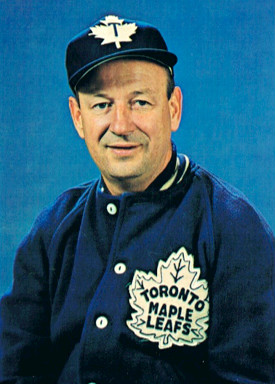
Punch Imlach won four Cups as the Leafs' coach in the 1960s. However, his second stint as the club's general manager during the 1979–80 season was controversial, as he traded Lanny McDonald, and engaged in a public dispute with team captain Darryl Sittler.

In July 1979, Ballard brought Imlach, a longtime friend, back to the organization as GM. When the Leafs traded McDonald, a close friend of Sittler, to the moribund Colorado Rockies on December 29, 1979; a member of the Leafs anonymously told the Toronto Star that Ballard and Imlach would "do anything to get at Sittler" and traded McDonald to undermine Sittler's influence on the team. Sittler, along with other Leafs who were members of the NHL Players' Association, was agitating for a better contract. Angry teammates trashed their dressing room in response, and Sittler temporarily resigned his captaincy. NHL executive director Alan Eagleson, who was also Sittler's agent, called the trade "a classless act." Sittler himself was gone two years later, when the Leafs traded him to the Philadelphia Flyers. He left as the franchise's all-time leading scorer.

The McDonald trade sent the Leafs into a downward spiral. They finished five games under .500 and only made the playoffs due to the presence of the Quebec Nordiques, a refugee from the WHA, in the Adams Division. Ironically, Ballard had opposed taking the Nordiques and three other WHA teams into the NHL for the start of the 1979–80 season. He had never forgiven the WHA for nearly decimating his roster in the early 1970s, and the addition of three Canadian teams (the Nordiques, Winnipeg Jets and Edmonton Oilers) significantly reduced the Leafs' revenue from Hockey Night in Canada broadcasts (which was now split six ways rather than three).

For the next 12 years, the Leafs were barely competitive, not posting another winning record until 1992–93. They missed the playoffs six times and only finished above fourth in their division once (in 1990, the only season where they even posted a .500 record). They only made it beyond the first round of the playoffs twice (in 1986 and 1987, advancing to the division finals). The low point came in 1984–85, when they finished 32 games under .500, the second-worst record in franchise history (their .300 winning percentage was only 22 percentage points higher than the 1918–19 Arenas).

Many times, they made the playoffs with horrendous records, in at least two cases with the worst winning percentages on record for a playoff team. In 1985-86, for instance, they finished with the fourth-worst record in the league (and fourth-worst in franchise history, at .356). However, the Norris Division was extremely weak that year; the division champion Black Hawks only notched 86 points. In those days, the four top teams in each division made the playoffs, regardless of record. Despite finishing with two fewer points than the New Jersey Devils, the Leafs made the playoffs. They then swept the Hawks in three games before going down to the Blues in seven games.

In 1987–88, they finished with the second-worst record in the league (and third-worst record in franchise history, at .325), and only a point ahead of the Minnesota North Stars for the worst record. However, the Norris Division was even weaker than it had been two years earlier; the Red Wings were the only team with a winning record. As a result, the Leafs and Stars were actually still in playoff contention on the last day of the season. The Leafs defeated the Red Wings in the final game of the regular season, while the Stars lost to the Flames. This handed the Leafs the final playoff spot from the division. The Leafs gave the Red Wings a surprisingly tough series in the first round, pushing them to six games. Many Leafs fans consider Ballard's tenure as owner to be the darkest era in team history; indeed, they only notched six winning seasons during Ballard's 18-plus years as majority owner, never finished above third in their division and only got out of the second round twice. The Leafs' subpar performance led some to call them the "Maple Laughs."

The Leafs' poor record resulted in several high draft picks. Wendel Clark, the first overall pick in the 1985 draft went on to captain the team.

== Resurgence (1990–2004) ==
Ballard died in 1990. A year later, supermarket tycoon Steve Stavro, a longtime friend of Ballard's, bought the team from Ballard's estate in partnership with the Ontario Teachers' Pension Plan. Unlike Ballard, Stavro hated the limelight and rarely interfered in the Leafs' hockey operations.

After 1991–92, ex-Calgary Flames GM Cliff Fletcher took over the team. He made a series of trades and free agent acquisitions which turned the Leafs from an also-ran to a contender almost overnight. Unlike the league's other Canadian teams, the Leafs were not seriously impacted by the escalation of player salaries in the early 1990s. In fact, they actually thrived, as they were based in the league's fourth largest market.

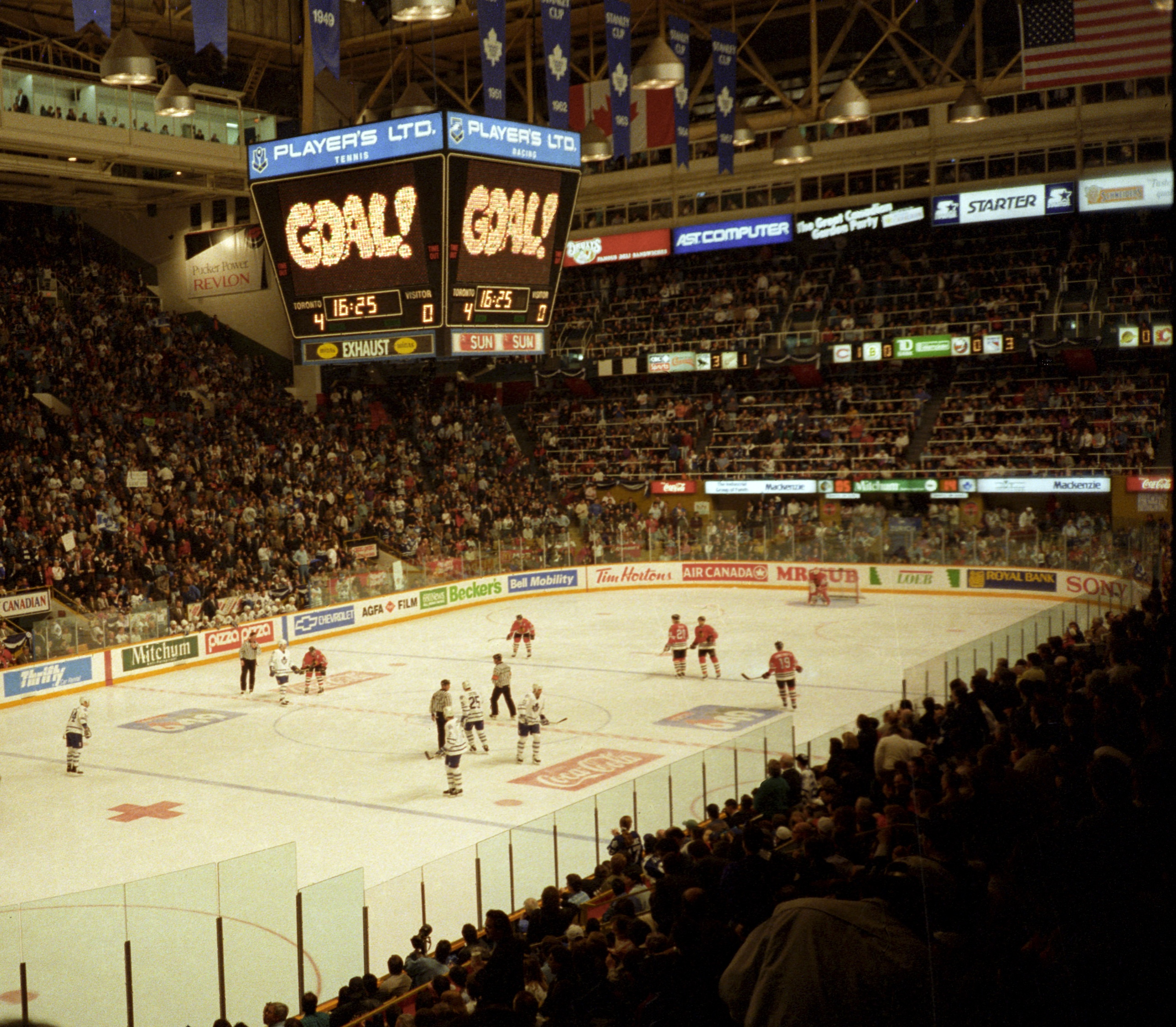
The Maple Leafs faced the Blackhawks in the Western Conference Quarterfinals of the 1994 Stanley Cup playoffs.

The new stars paid almost immediate dividends in 1992–93. Doug Gilmour, who had come over from the Flames the previous season, scored 32 goals and 95 assists to lead the team in scoring. Dave Andreychuk had come to the Leafs from the Buffalo Sabres and would score 25 goals in his first 31 games as a Leaf as well as being the league's leading power-play goal scorer. Netminder Felix Potvin was also solid with an NHL-best 2.50 goals-against average. Toronto finished with a franchise-record 99 points, good enough for third place in the Norris Division and the eighth-best record in the league. The Leafs dispatched the Detroit Red Wings in the first round with an overtime winner from Nikolai Borschevsky in game seven, then won the Norris Division final by defeating the St. Louis Blues, also in seven games.

With Montreal facing the New York Islanders in the Wales Conference final, Canadians and hockey purists began dreaming of a Montreal–Toronto Cup Finals, as the Leafs faced the Los Angeles Kings, led by their captain Wayne Gretzky, in the Campbell Conference final. The Leafs were up 3–2 in the series, but lost game six. Gretzky's hat-trick in game seven would finish the Leafs' run, and it would be the Kings who would move on to the Finals against the Canadiens.

The Leafs had another strong season in 1993–94, finishing with 98 points. This was good enough for the fifth-best record in the league—their highest overall finish in 16 years. However, despite finishing one point above the Calgary Flames, the Leafs were seeded third in the Western Conference (formerly the Campbell Conference) by virtue of the Flames' Pacific Division title. However, a six-game series against the Blackhawks and a seven-game series against the San Jose Sharks took their toll on the team; they were defeated by the Vancouver Canucks—a team that finished 13 points below them in the regular season—in five games.

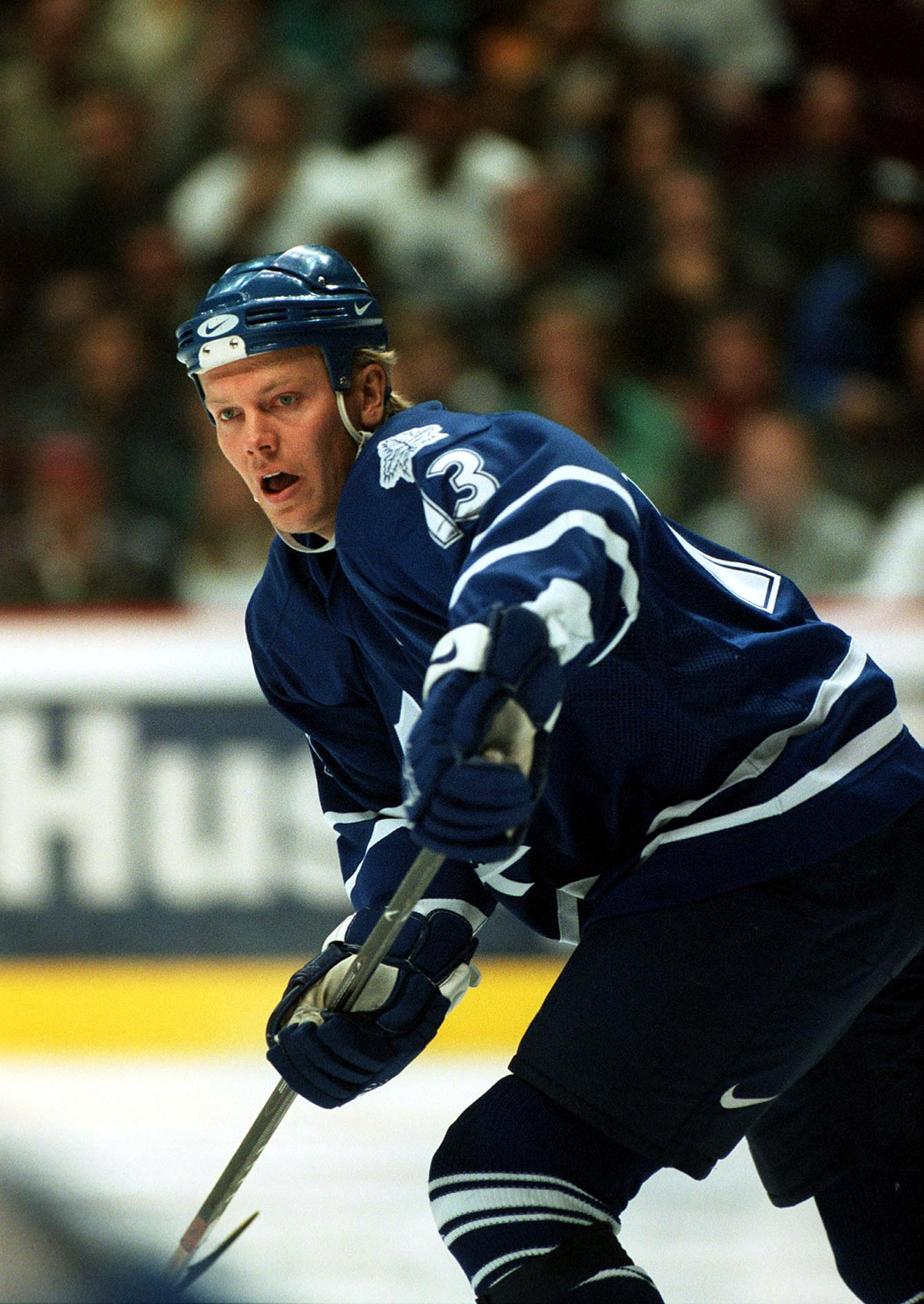
Mats Sundin with the Maple Leafs during the 1997–98 season, his first season as team captain.

The Maple Leafs moved arenas halfway through the 1998-99 season. On February 13, 1999, the Maple Leafs played their last game at Maple Leaf Gardens losing 6–2 to the Chicago Blackhawks. Derek King scored the last Leaf goal and notorious tough guy Bob Probert scored the final NHL goal in Gardens history. During the emotional post-game ceremony, legendary Canadian singer Anne Murray performed "The Maple Leaf Forever" while wearing a Toronto jersey. The first Maple Leafs game at the new Air Canada Centre took place on February 20, 1999, against the Montreal Canadiens, where they won 3–2 with an overtime goal by Steve Thomas. Todd Warriner of the Leafs scored the first goal ever at the new arena.

After two years out of the playoffs in the late 1990s, the Leafs made another charge during the 1999 playoffs after moving from Maple Leaf Gardens to the new Air Canada Centre. Mats Sundin, who had joined the team from the Quebec Nordiques in a 1994 trade involving Wendel Clark, had one of his most productive seasons, scoring 31 goals and totaling 83 points. Sergei Berezin scored 37 goals, Curtis Joseph won 35 games with a 2.56 GAA, and enforcer Tie Domi racked up 198 penalty minutes. The Leafs eliminated the Philadelphia Flyers and Pittsburgh Penguins in the first two rounds of the playoffs, but lost in five games to the Buffalo Sabres in the Eastern Conference Finals.

The Maple Leafs would reach the second round in both 2000 and 2001, losing both times to the New Jersey Devils, who would make the Stanley Cup Final both seasons. The 2000 season was particularly notable because it marked the Leafs' first division title in 37 years, as well as the franchise's first-ever 100-point season. The season ended on a particular low, however, with the Leafs being held to just six shots in the final contest (game six) against the Devils.

In 2002, they would dispatch the Islanders and their trans-Ontario rivals, the Ottawa Senators, in the first two rounds, only to lose to the Cinderella-story Carolina Hurricanes in the Conference Finals. The 2002 season was particularly impressive in that the Leafs had many of their better players sidelined by injuries, but managed to make it to the conference finals due to the efforts of Alyn McCauley, Gary Roberts and Alexander Mogilny, although they would eventually fall to the Hurricanes.

Joseph left to go to the defending champion Red Wings in the 2002 off-season; the team almost immediately found a replacement in veteran Ed Belfour, who came over from the Dallas Stars and had been a crucial part of their 1999 Stanley Cup run. Belfour could not help their playoff woes in the 2003 playoffs, however, as they lost to Philadelphia in seven games in the first round. The 2003–04 season started in an uncommon way for the team, as they held their training camp in Sweden, and playing in the NHL Challenge against teams from Sweden and Finland. That year, the Leafs posted a franchise-record 103 points. They also finished with the fourth-best record in the league—their best overall finish in 41 years. They also managed a .628 win percentage, their best in 43 years (and the third-best in franchise history). They defeated the Senators in the first round of the playoffs for the fourth time in five years, but lost to the Flyers in the second round in six games.

== Post-lockout (2005–2014) ==
Following the 2004–05 NHL lockout, the Maple Leafs experienced their longest playoff drought in the club's history. They struggled in the 2005–06 season; despite a late-season surge (9–1–2 in their final 12 games), led by goaltender Jean-Sebastien Aubin, Toronto was out of playoff contention for the first time since 1998. They missed the playoffs by two points. This marked the first time the team had missed the postseason under Quinn, who was later relieved as head coach. Quinn's dismissal was controversial since many of the young players who were key contributors to the Leafs' late-season run had been drafted by Quinn during his tenure as the team's general manager (1999-2003), while three players (Jason Allison, Belfour, Alexander Khavanov, and Eric Lindros) who were signed by Quinn's successor as GM, John Ferguson, Jr., had suffered season-ending injuries.

Paul Maurice, who had previously coached the inaugural season of the Maple Leafs' Toronto Marlies farm team, was named as Quinn's replacement. On June 30, 2006, the Leafs bought out fan-favourite Tie Domi's contract. The team also decided against picking up the option year on goaltender Ed Belfour's contract; he became a free agent.

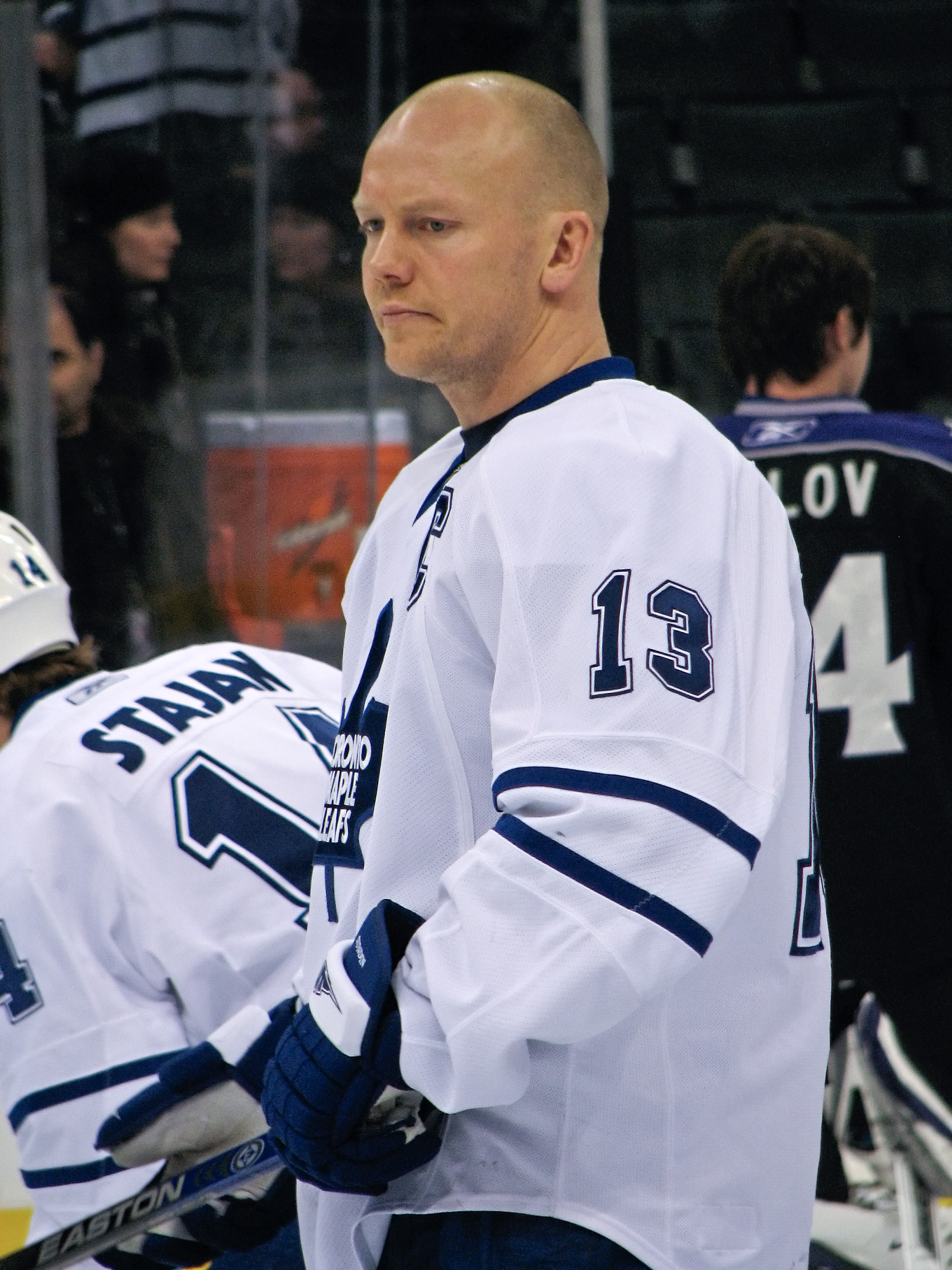
Sundin during the 2007–08 season, his last as a Maple Leaf.

However, despite the coaching change, as well as a shuffle in the roster, the team did not make the playoffs in 2006–07, missing the playoffs by just one point. During the 2007–08 season, John Ferguson, Jr. was fired in January 2008, and replaced by former Leafs' general manager Cliff Fletcher on an interim basis. The Leafs did not qualify for the post-season, marking the first time since 1928 the team had failed to make the playoffs for three consecutive seasons. It was also Sundin's last year with the Leafs, as his contract was due to expire at the end of the season. However, he refused Leafs management's request to waive his no-trade clause in order for the team to rebuild by acquiring prospects and/or draft picks. On May 7, 2008, after the 2007–08 season, the Leafs fired Maurice, as well as assistant coach Randy Ladouceur, naming Ron Wilson as the new head coach, and Tim Hunter and Rob Zettler as assistant coaches.

During the 2007–2008 season again the Leafs struggled in their division, only this time, their Captain, Mats Sundin was asked to waive his no-trade clause to try and advance the team's hopes of the playoffs, and a more promising 2008–2009 season. Sundin declined, acknowledging that from his perspective the Leafs still had the chance to make the playoffs, and that he did not want to be a "rental player" to a playoff bound team. The other glaring factor, though rarely discussed, was the obvious contractual obligation both parties had entered into when Sundin's contract was originally written—the no-trade clause. It is widely speculated that culmination of these events soured Leaf fans and also strained relations between Sundin and the Toronto organization. Ultimately, Toronto did not make the playoffs during the 2007–2008 season, and Mats Sundin was an unrestricted free agent, contemplating retirement from the NHL.

Following approximately nine months of contemplation, Mats Sundin returned to the NHL, signing with the Vancouver Canucks. Mats cited his decision to return to the NHL was based partly on "having a chance at winning the Stanley Cup". Toronto faced Vancouver two times during the 2008–2009 season, losing in both showdowns, most notably during a shoot out decision on February 21, 2009, where Mats Sundin was honored at the ACC. He also scored the winning goal to defeat Toronto.

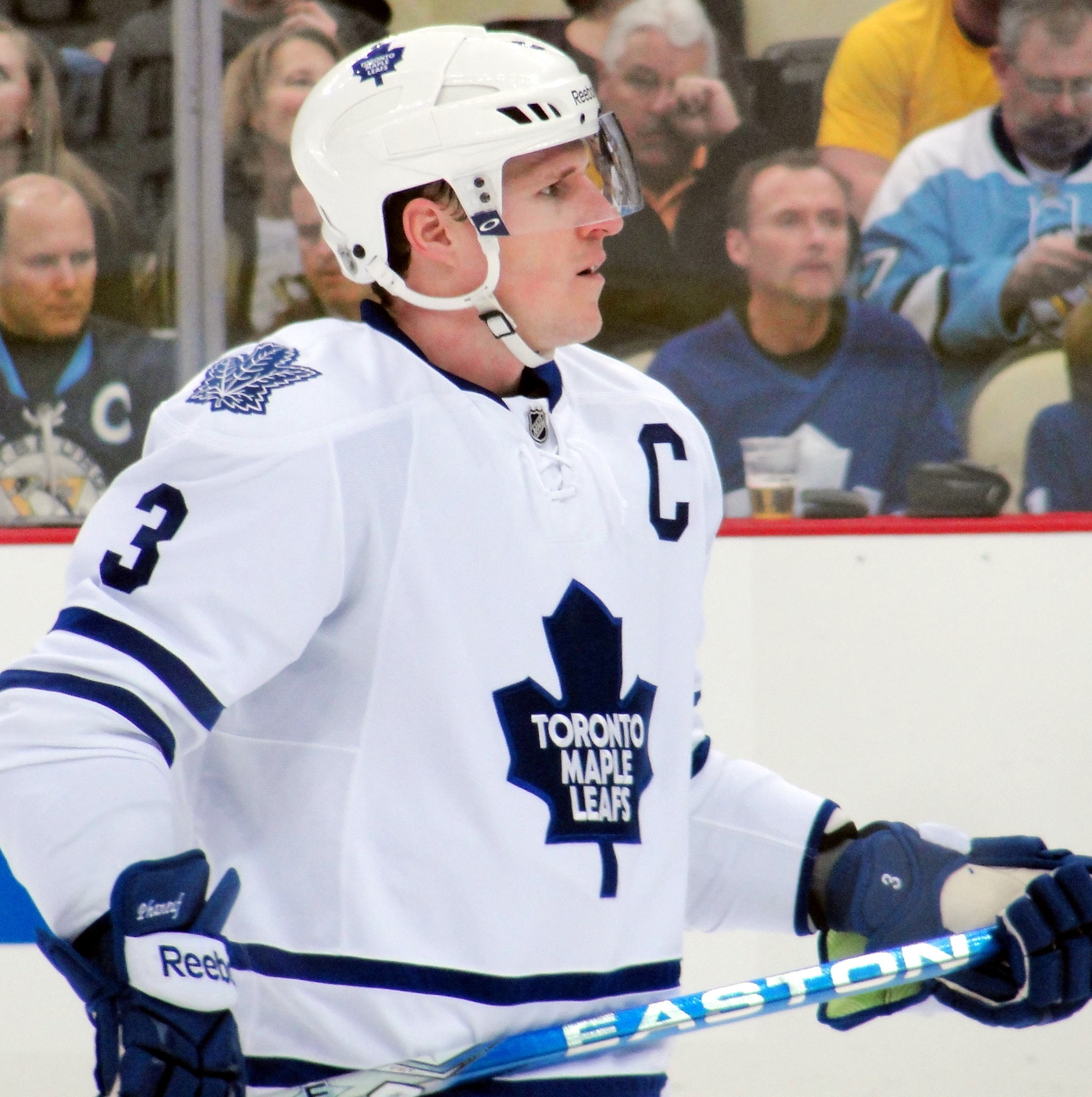
Dion Phaneuf was named the team captain in the 2010 off-season, maintaining the position until he was traded to Ottawa in 2016.

On November 29, 2008, the Maple Leafs hired Brian Burke as their 13th non-interim, and the first American, general manager in team history. The acquisition ended the second Cliff Fletcher era and settled persistent rumours that Burke was coming to Toronto. On June 26, 2009, Burke made his first appearance as the Leafs GM at the 2009 NHL entry draft, selecting London Knights forward Nazem Kadri with the seventh overall pick. On September 18, 2009, Burke traded Toronto's first- and second-round 2010, as well as its 2011 first-round picks, to the Boston Bruins in exchange for forward Phil Kessel. On January 31, 2010, the Leafs made another high-profile trade, this time with the Calgary Flames in a seven-player deal that brought defenceman Dion Phaneuf to Toronto. The Maple Leafs finished 29th in the NHL in 2009–10, ahead of only the Edmonton Oilers, despite a 13-10-3 run in their last 23 games. In finishing 29th, the Bruins got the second-overall pick in the 2010 NHL Draft.

On June 14, during the off-season, the Leafs named Phaneuf captain after two seasons without one following Sundin's departure. On February 18, 2011, the team traded long-time Maple Leafs defenceman Tomas Kaberle to the Bruins in exchange for prospect Joe Colborne, Boston's first-round pick in 2011, and a conditional second-round draft choice. The Leafs, under the play of rookie goaltender James Reimer, almost made the 2011 playoffs, but missed by six points.

The 2011–12 season brought great expectations for the Leafs. Carried by the play of Kessel and Joffrey Lupul, Toronto had a successful start to the season, as they were 4th in the League at one point. Kessel and Lupul couldn't maintain that level of play, however, and missed the playoffs, finishing 26th in the League. On March 2, 2012, Burke fired Wilson and named Randy Carlyle the new head coach. However, the termination proved to be controversial as Wilson had received a contract extension just two months prior to being let go. Changes at the ownership level also occurred in August 2012, when the OTPP completed the sale of their shares in MLSE to BCE Inc. and Rogers Communications. On June 23, 2012, Burke traded defenseman Luke Schenn, a player he had drafted fifth overall in the 2008 NHL entry draft, for James van Riemsdyk, a player who would play six productive seasons with Toronto. On January 9, 2013, Burke was fired as general manager, replaced by Dave Nonis. In their first full season under the leadership of Carlyle, Toronto managed to secure a playoff berth in the 2012–13 season (which was shortened again due to another lock-out) for the first time in eight years. After being down 3–1 in their first-round series with the Boston Bruins, the Maple Leafs rallied to win games five and six, but lost game seven after blowing a 4–1 lead in the third period. They lost 5–4 in overtime. Despite the season's success, it was not repeated during the 2013–14 season, as the Leafs failed to make the playoffs. The Leafs had a mid-season surge, getting to third in the Atlantic Division and 80 points, but after a March 13 win against the Kings, they went 6–14 to end the season, missing the playoffs.

== Brendan Shanahan era (2014–2025) ==
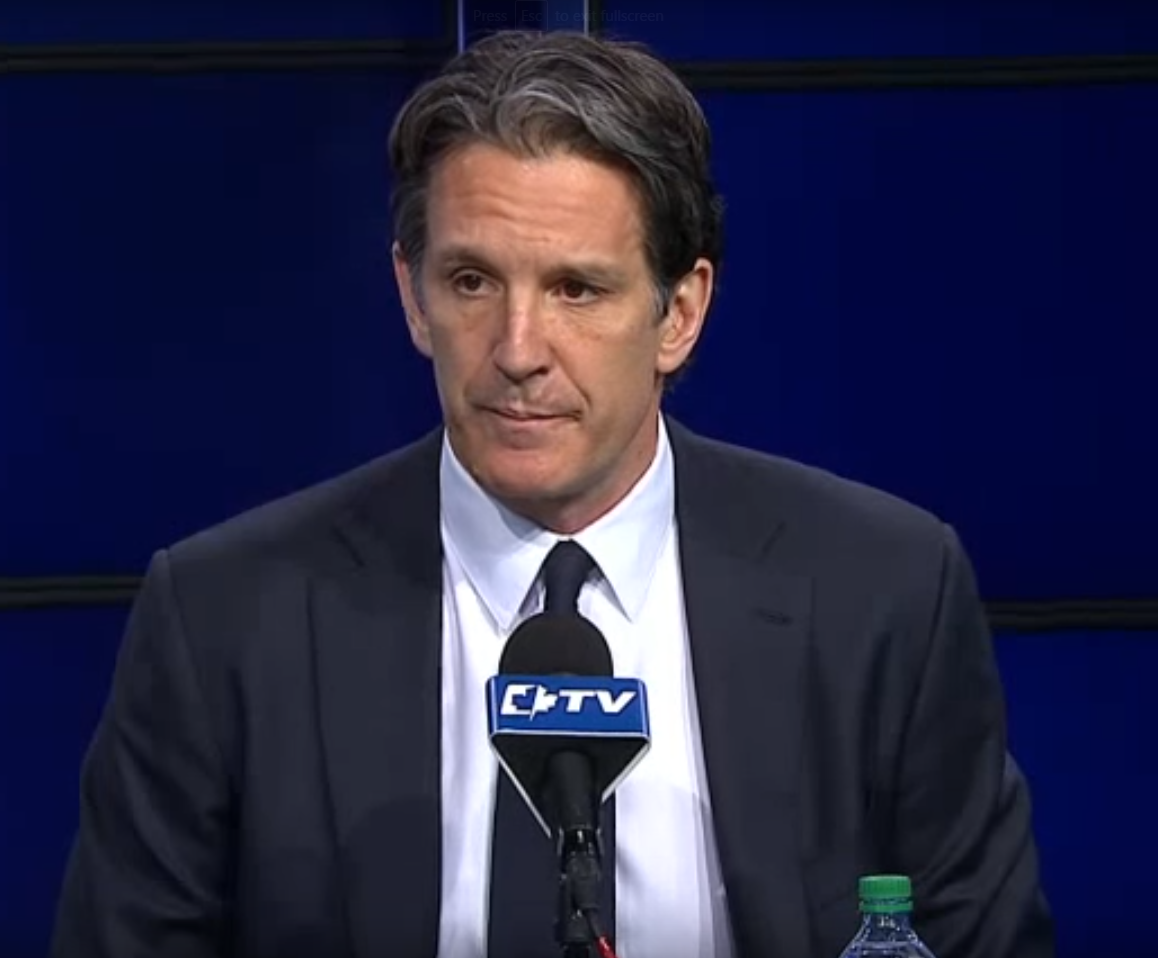
Brendan Shanahan was named the president and an alternate governor of the club shortly after the 2013–2014 season ended.

Shortly after the end of the 2013–14 regular season, Brendan Shanahan was named as the president and an alternate governor of the Maple Leafs. On January 6, 2015, the Leafs fired Randy Carlyle as head coach, and assistant coach Peter Horachek took over on an interim basis immediately. While the Leafs had a winning record before Carlyle's firing, the team eventually collapsed. On February 6, 2015, the Leafs set a new franchise record of 11 consecutive games without a win. At the beginning of February, Shanahan gained the approval of MLSE's Board of Directors to begin a "scorched earth" rebuild of the club. Both Dave Nonis and Horachek were relieved of their duties on April 12, just one day after the season concluded. In addition, the Leafs also fired a number of assistant coaches, including Steve Spott, Rick St. Croix; as well as individuals from the Leafs' player scouting department.

On May 20, 2015, Mike Babcock was named as the new head coach, and on June 23, Lou Lamoriello was named the 16th general manager in team history. On July 1, 2015, the Leafs packaged Kessel in a multi-player deal to the Pittsburgh Penguins in return for three skaters, including Kasperi Kapanen, a conditional first round pick, and a third round pick. Toronto also retained $1.2 million of Kessel's salary for the remaining seven seasons of his contract. During the following season, on February 9, 2016, the Leafs packaged Phaneuf in another multi-player deal, acquiring four players, as well as a 2017 2nd-round pick from the Ottawa Senators. The team finished last in the NHL for the first time since the 1984–85 season and secured a 20 percent chance at winning the first overall pick in the 2016 NHL entry draft. They were also guaranteed to pick no lower than fourth. They subsequently won the draft lottery and used the first overall pick to draft Auston Matthews.

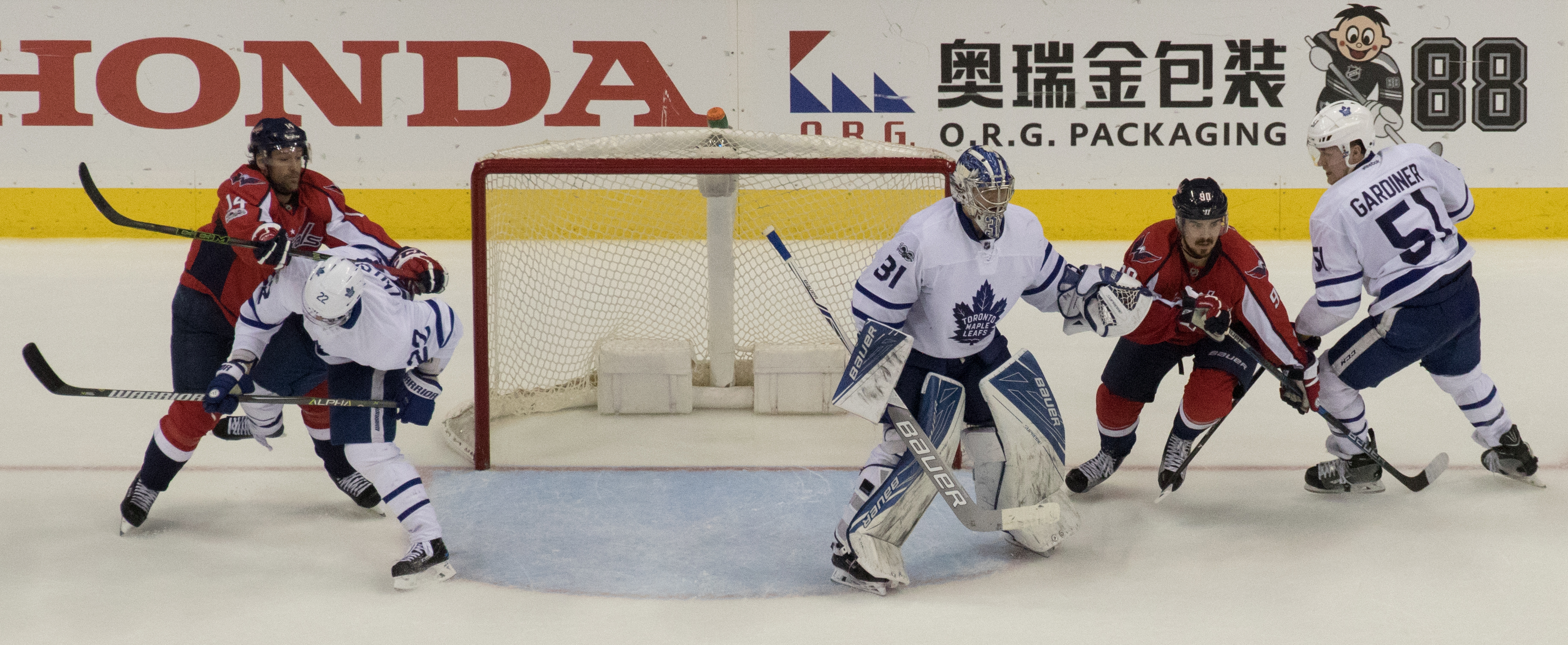
The Maple Leafs faced the Washington Capitals in the first round of the 2017 playoffs.

In their second season under Babcock, Toronto secured the final Eastern Conference wildcard spot for the 2017 playoffs. On April 23, 2017, the Maple Leafs were eliminated from the playoffs by the top-seeded Washington Capitals. With a score of 2–1 in the sixth game of the first round, Marcus Johansson scored the winner for the Capitals 6:31 into overtime. Toronto finished the 2017–18 season with 105 points by beating Montreal 4–2 in their final game of the regular season, a franchise-record, beating the previous record of 103 points set in 2004. They faced the Boston Bruins in the first round and lost in seven games.

Following the playoffs, Lamoriello was not renewed as general manager and was transitioned to senior advisor. Kyle Dubas was subsequently named the 17th general manager in team history. During the 2018 off-season, the Maple Leafs signed John Tavares to a seven-year, $77 million contract. Tavares was subsequently named an alternate captain for the Leafs, alongside Morgan Rielly, and Patrick Marleau. On April 1, the Maple Leafs clinched a division berth for the 2019 Stanley Cup playoffs. The Maple Leafs were eliminated in the first round of the 2019 playoffs on April 23, after losing to the Bruins in a seven-game series.

On October 2, 2019, Tavares was named as the team's 25th team captain prior to the Leafs' 2019–20 season opening game. On November 20, 2019, Shanahan and the Leafs announced the firing of Babcock as head coach, following a six-game losing streak. At the time, the Leafs had a 9–10–4 record and were not in a playoff spot, despite high pre-season expectations. During his tenure as the Leafs' head coach, Babcock had a record of 173-133-45 in 351 games with the team. Babcock was replaced by Calder Cup-winning Toronto Marlies' head coach Sheldon Keefe. That year, the Maple Leafs were eliminated in the 2020 Stanley Cup Qualifiers on August 9, after losing a five-game series against the Columbus Blue Jackets.

As a result of the COVID-19 pandemic and travel restrictions at the Canada–United States border, the Leafs were temporarily moved to the North Division for the 2020–21 season alongside the NHL's other Canadian teams. During that season, teams only played games against teams in their new divisions in a limited 56-game season. On May 8, 2021, the Leafs clinched the North Division title, giving the Leafs guaranteed home advantage in the first two rounds of the 2021 Stanley Cup playoffs. Matthews also led the league in goals with 41 in 52 games played, becoming the first Maple Leaf to capture the Maurice "Rocket" Richard Trophy. However, the Leafs lost in the first round to the Montreal Canadiens, surrendering a 3–1 series lead in the process.

Despite the devastating ending to the previous season, the Maple Leafs seamed poised to make another run, as the main roster was kept generally intact. Aided by the arrival of goaltender Carter Hutton from the Arizona Coyotes on February 21, 2022, and the acquisition of defenceman Mark Giordano and center Colin Blackwell from the Seattle Kraken on March 21, the team cruised throughout the regular season. The Leafs broke their franchise record for points in a season, with 115, and wins in a season, with 54, during a 4–2 victory over the New York Islanders on April 17. Despite the achievement, they were unable to match the Florida Panthers' dominance, who not only came away with the division championship but secured the best finish in the NHL. The Leafs made the playoffs, but lost in the first round to the Tampa Bay Lightning in seven games.

After the conclusion of the Maple Leafs run in the 2025 Stanley Cup Playoffs, on May 22, 2025, Maple Leafs Sports & Entertainment announced that Brendan Shanahan's contract would not be renewed.

== See also ==
- History of the National Hockey League
- List of Toronto Maple Leafs draft picks
- List of Toronto Maple Leafs general managers
- List of Toronto Maple Leafs head coaches
- List of Toronto Maple Leafs players
- List of Toronto Maple Leafs seasons
