= List of Toronto Maple Leafs general managers =

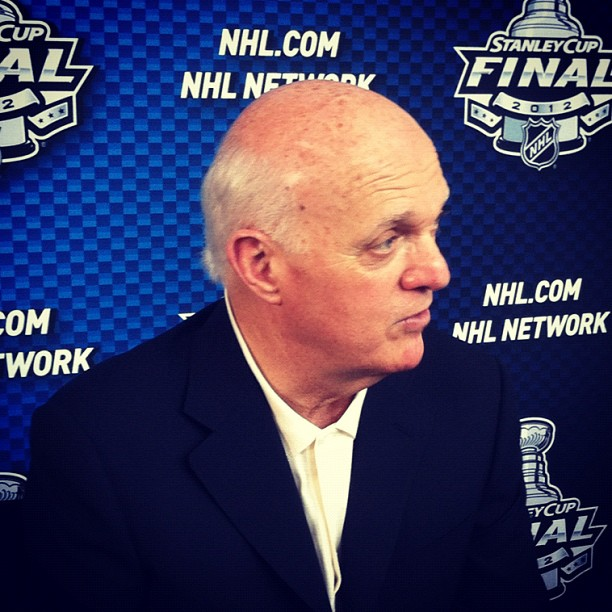
Lou Lamoriello was the 16th general manager of the Toronto Maple Leafs, holding the role between 2015 and 2018.

The Toronto Maple Leafs are a professional ice hockey team based in Toronto, Ontario. They are members of the Atlantic Division in the Eastern Conference of the National Hockey League (NHL) and are known as one of the Original Six teams of the league. Founded in 1917, the club had no nickname in their first season, and were known as the Toronto Arenas for their second season. From the 1919–20 season they were known as the Toronto St. Patricks, until in February 1927 when the club was purchased by Conn Smythe. Smythe changed the name of the club to the Maple Leafs and they have been known by that name ever since. The franchise has had nineteen general managers since their inception.

== Key ==
Key of terms and definitions
Term	Definition
No.	Number of general managers^{[a]}
Ref(s)	References
–	Does not apply
†	Elected to the Hockey Hall of Fame in the Builder category
†	Elected to the Hockey Hall of Fame in the Player category
†	Elected to the Hockey Hall of Fame in category other than Builder or Player

== General managers ==
General managers of the Toronto Maple Leafs
No.	Name	Tenure	Accomplishments during this term	Ref(s)
1	Charles Querrie	1917 – February 14, 1927	Won Stanley Cup 2 times (1918, 1922); 4 playoff appearances	
2	Conn Smythe†	February 14, 1927 – September 1, 1957^{[b]}	Won Stanley Cup 7 times (1932, 1942, 1945, 1947, 1948, 1949, 1951); Lost in Stanley Cup Final 6 times (1933, 1935, 1936, 1938, 1939, 1940); 4 division titles and 25 playoff appearances	
3	Hap Day†	February 1, 1955 – March 25, 1957	2 playoff appearances	
4	Howie Meeker†	May 14, 1957 – October 3, 1957		
–	Stafford Smythe (de facto)	October 3, 1957 – November 22, 1958		
5	Punch Imlach†	November 22, 1958 – April 6, 1969	Won Stanley Cup 4 times in 6 finals appearances (1959, 1960, 1962, 1963, 1964, 1967); 10 playoff appearances	
6	Jim Gregory†	April 6, 1969 – July 4, 1979	8 playoff appearances	
–	Punch Imlach†	July 4, 1979 – October 1981	2 playoff appearances	
7	Gerry McNamara	October 1981 – February 7, 1988	3 playoff appearances	
8	Gord Stellick	April 28, 1988 – August 11, 1989	No playoff appearances	
9	Floyd Smith	August 15, 1989 – June 4, 1991	1 playoff appearance	
10	Cliff Fletcher†	June 4, 1991 – May 25, 1997	4 playoff appearances	
–	Bill Watters (Interim)	May 25, 1997 – August 21, 1997		
11	Ken Dryden†	August 21, 1997 – July 15, 1999	1 playoff appearance	
12	Pat Quinn†	July 15, 1999 – August 29, 2003	1 division title and 4 playoff appearances	
13	John Ferguson, Jr.	August 29, 2003 – January 22, 2008	1 playoff appearance	
–	Cliff Fletcher† (Interim)	January 22, 2008 – November 29, 2008	No playoff appearances	
14	Brian Burke†	November 29, 2008 – January 9, 2013	No playoff appearances	
15	Dave Nonis	January 9, 2013 – April 12, 2015	1 playoff appearance	
16	Lou Lamoriello†	July 23, 2015 – April 30, 2018	2 playoff appearances	
17	Kyle Dubas	May 11, 2018 – May 19, 2023	1 division title and 5 playoff appearances	
18	Brad Treliving	May 31, 2023 – March 30, 2026	1 division title and 2 playoff appearances	
–	Ryan Hardy; Brandon Pridham (Interim)	March 31, 2026 – May 3, 2026		
19	John Chayka	May 3, 2026 – present		

== See also ==
- List of NHL general managers

== Notes ==
- ^{a} A running total of the number of general managers of the franchise. Thus any general manager who has two or more separate terms as general manager is only counted once. Interim general managers do not count towards the total.
- ^{b} From 1955 to 1957, Smythe turned over most of his authority over day-to-day hockey operations to Hap Day, but remained general manager on paper.
