= Nick Metz =

Canadian ice hockey player

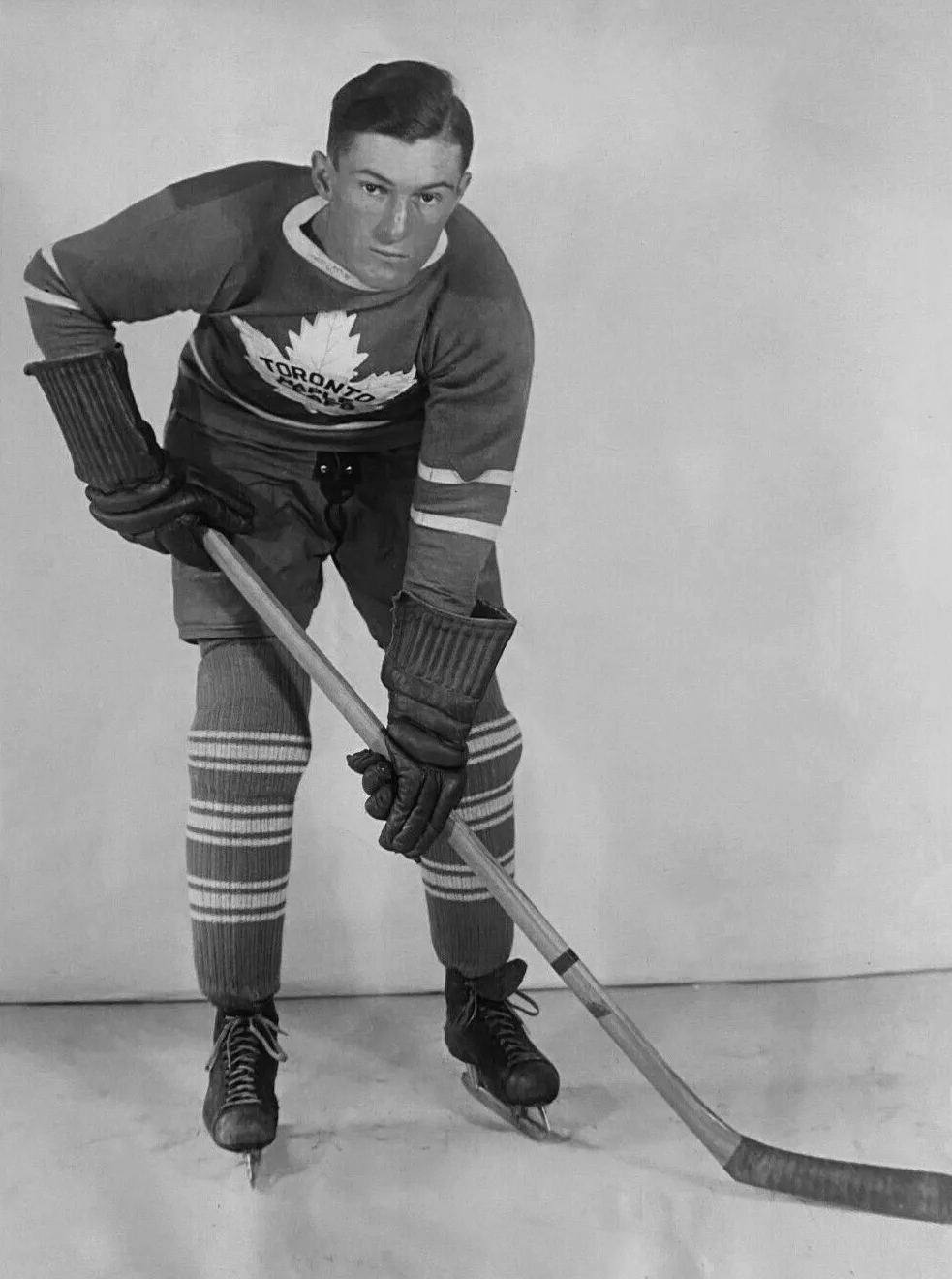
- Metz, c. 1940
- Born: February 16, 1914 Wilcox, Saskatchewan, Canada
- Died: August 24, 1990 (aged 76)
- Height: 5 ft 11 in (180 cm)
- Weight: 165 lb (75 kg; 11 st 11 lb)
- Position: Left wing
- Shot: Left
- Played for: Toronto Maple Leafs
- Playing career: 1934–1948

Nicholas John Metz (February 16, 1914 – August 24, 1990) was a Canadian professional ice hockey left winger who played 12 seasons in the National Hockey League for the Toronto Maple Leafs. Metz was the brother of Don Metz.

== Awards ==
- Stanley Cup champion in 1942, 1945, 1947, 1948 (Toronto)

== Career statistics ==
=== Regular season and playoffs ===
			Regular season					Playoffs
Season	Team	League	GP	G	A	Pts	PIM	GP	G	A	Pts	PIM
1931–32	St. Michael's Buzzers	OHA-Jr.	—	—	—	—	—	—	—	—	—	—
1932–33	Toronto St. Michael's Majors	OHA-Jr.	10	9	3	12	14	2	0	2	2	2
1933–34	Toronto St. Michael's Majors	OHA-Jr.	12	18	15	33	10	3	4	0	4	6
1933–34	Toronto St. Michael's Majors	M-Cup	—	—	—	—	—	13	9	7	16	16
1934–35	Toronto Maple Leafs	NHL	18	2	2	4	4	6	1	1	2	0
1934–35	Syracuse Stars	IHL	26	13	13	26	6	—	—	—	—	—
1935–36	Toronto Maple Leafs	NHL	38	14	6	20	14	—	—	—	—	—
1936–37	Toronto Maple Leafs	NHL	48	9	11	20	19	2	0	0	0	0
1937–38	Toronto Maple Leafs	NHL	48	15	7	22	12	7	0	2	2	0
1938–39	Toronto Maple Leafs	NHL	47	11	10	21	15	10	3	3	6	6
1939–40	Toronto Maple Leafs	NHL	31	6	5	11	2	9	1	3	4	9
1940–41	Toronto Maple Leafs	NHL	47	14	21	35	10	7	3	4	7	0
1941–42	Toronto Maple Leafs	NHL	30	11	9	20	20	13	4	4	8	12
1942–43	Nanaimo Army	NNDHL	1	1	2	3	0	—	—	—	—	—
1942–43	Nanaimo Army	Al-Cup	—	—	—	—	—	13	3	3	6	10
1943–44	Nanaimo Clippers	PCHL	7	2	7	9	6	—	—	—	—	—
1944–45	Toronto Maple Leafs	NHL	50	22	13	35	26	7	1	1	2	2
1945–46	Toronto Maple Leafs	NHL	41	11	11	22	4	—	—	—	—	—
1946–47	Toronto Maple Leafs	NHL	60	12	16	28	15	6	4	2	6	0
1947–48	Toronto Maple Leafs	NHL	60	4	8	12	8	9	2	0	2	2
NHL totals			518	131	119	250	149	76	19	20	39	31
