= Pete Langelle =

Canadian ice hockey player

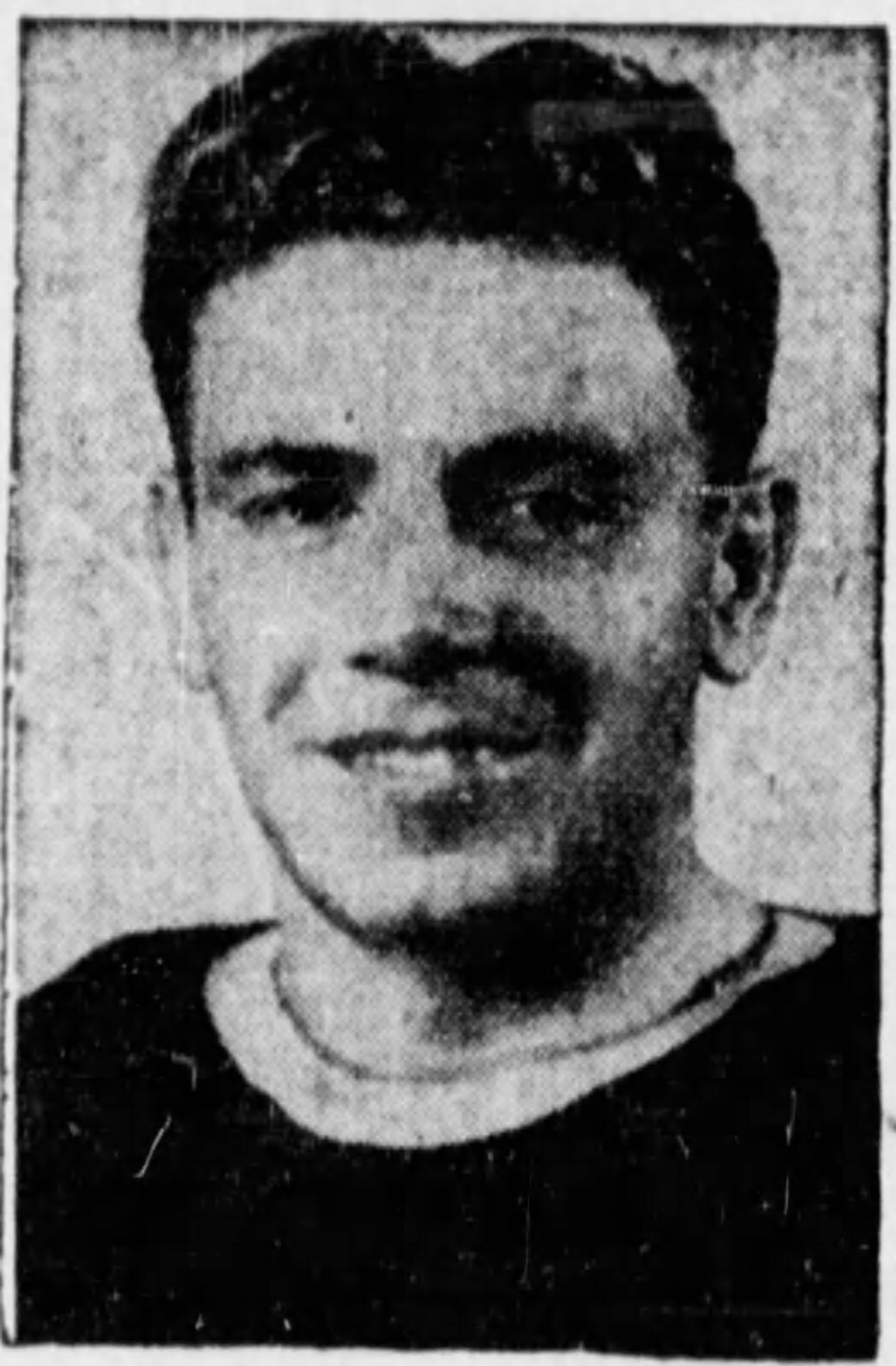
- Langelle pictured in a 1943 newspaper
- Born: November 4, 1917 Winnipeg, Manitoba, Canada
- Died: November 29, 2010 (aged 93) Winnipeg, Manitoba, Canada
- Height: 5 ft 10 in (178 cm)
- Weight: 170 lb (77 kg; 12 st 2 lb)
- Position: Centre
- Shot: Left
- Played for: Toronto Maple Leafs
- Playing career: 1937–1952

Peter Landiak (November 4, 1917 – November 29, 2010), better known as Pete Langelle, was a Canadian professional ice hockey centre who played 137 games in the National Hockey League with the Toronto Maple Leafs from 1939 to 1942. He was born in Winnipeg, Manitoba. He scored the Stanley Cup-winning goal in Game 7 of the 1942 Stanley Cup Finals as the Toronto Maple Leafs completed their comeback from a 3–0 series deficit, the only such comeback in Stanley Cup Finals history.

== Career statistics ==
=== Regular season and playoffs ===
			Regular season					Playoffs
Season	Team	League	GP	G	A	Pts	PIM	GP	G	A	Pts	PIM
1934–35	East Kildonan North Stars	MAHA	—	—	—	—	—	—	—	—	—	—
1935–36	Winnipeg Monarchs	MJHL	15	5	4	9	6	—	—	—	—	—
1936–37	Winnipeg Monarchs	MJHL	16	12	7	19	18	8	2	1	3	2
1936–37	Winnipeg Monarchs	M-Cup	—	—	—	—	—	9	1	9	10	2
1937–38	Syracuse Stars	IAHL	48	4	14	18	8	8	5	4	9	2
1938–39	Toronto Maple Leafs	NHL	2	1	0	1	0	11	1	2	3	2
1938–39	Syracuse Stars	IAHL	51	10	13	23	8	—	—	—	—	—
1939–40	Toronto Maple Leafs	NHL	39	7	14	21	2	10	0	3	3	0
1940–41	Toronto Maple Leafs	NHL	48	4	15	19	0	7	1	1	2	0
1941–42	Toronto Maple Leafs	NHL	48	10	22	32	9	13	3	3	6	2
1942–43	Winnipeg RCAF Bombers	WNDHL	13	11	17	28	12	5	4	1	5	2
1942–43	Winnipeg RCAF Bombers	Al-Cup	—	—	—	—	—	12	7	6	13	2
1943–44	Winnipeg RCAF Bombers	WNDHL	10	4	5	9	7	—	—	—	—	—
1944–45	Winnipeg RCAF Bombers	WNDHL	10	4	6	10	2	—	—	—	—	—
1946–47	Pittsburgh Hornets	AHL	64	20	30	50	4	12	4	7	11	2
1947–48	Pittsburgh Hornets	AHL	67	21	37	58	8	2	0	0	0	0
1948–49	Pittsburgh Hornets	AHL	68	10	26	36	13	—	—	—	—	—
1949–50	Pittsburgh Hornets	AHL	47	8	15	23	7	—	—	—	—	—
1950–51	Pittsburgh Hornets	AHL	47	4	10	14	0	8	1	3	4	2
1951–52	Saint John Beavers	MMHL	72	16	18	34	35	10	3	1	4	4
1953–54	Pilot Mound Pioneers	MHL	13	4	14	18	14	—	—	—	—	—
1953–54	Winnipeg Maroons	Al-Cup	—	—	—	—	—	23	8	11	19	4
IAHL/AHL totals			392	77	145	222	48	30	10	14	24	6
NHL totals			137	22	51	73	11	41	5	9	14	4

== Awards and achievements ==
- Turnbull Cup MJHL Championship (1937)
- Memorial Cup Championship (1937)
- Stanley Cup Championship (1942)
- Honoured Member of the Manitoba Hockey Hall of Fame.
