= 1942 Stanley Cup Final =

1942 ice hockey championship series

	1	2	3	4	5	6	7	Total
Toronto Maple Leafs	2	2	2	4	9	3	3	4
Detroit Red Wings	3	4	5	3	3	0	1	3
- Location(s): Toronto: Maple Leaf Gardens (1, 2, 5, 7); Detroit: Olympia Stadium (3, 4, 6)
- Coaches: Toronto: Hap Day; Detroit: Jack Adams
- Captains: Toronto: Syl Apps; Detroit: Ebbie Goodfellow
- Referees: King Clancy (1, 5); Bill Chadwick (2, 6, 7); Norman Lamport (3); Mel Harwood (4)
- Dates: April 4–18, 1942
- Series-winning goal: Pete Langelle (9:48, third)
- Hall of Famers: Maple Leafs: Syl Apps (1961); Turk Broda (1967); Gordie Drillon (1975); Sweeney Schriner (1962); Red Wings: Sid Abel (1969); Ebbie Goodfellow (1963); Syd Howe (1965); Jack Stewart (1964); Coaches: Jack Adams (1959, player); Hap Day (1961, player)

The 1942 Stanley Cup Final was a best-of-seven series between the Toronto Maple Leafs and the Detroit Red Wings. After losing the first three games, the Maple Leafs won the next four to upset the Red Wings in seven games, winning their fourth Stanley Cup and becoming the first team in North American sports history to overcome a 3–0 series deficit to win a playoff series. Toronto is still the only NHL team to win a Stanley Cup Final after being down 3–0 in the series.

It was the first Stanley Cup Final in history to go seven games, and the only Stanley Cup Final to result in a reverse sweep.

== Paths to the Finals ==
Toronto defeated the New York Rangers in a best-of-seven 4–2 to advance to the Finals. The Red Wings had to play two best-of three series; winning 2–1 against the Montreal Canadiens, and 2–0 against the Boston Bruins to advance to the Finals.

== Game summaries ==
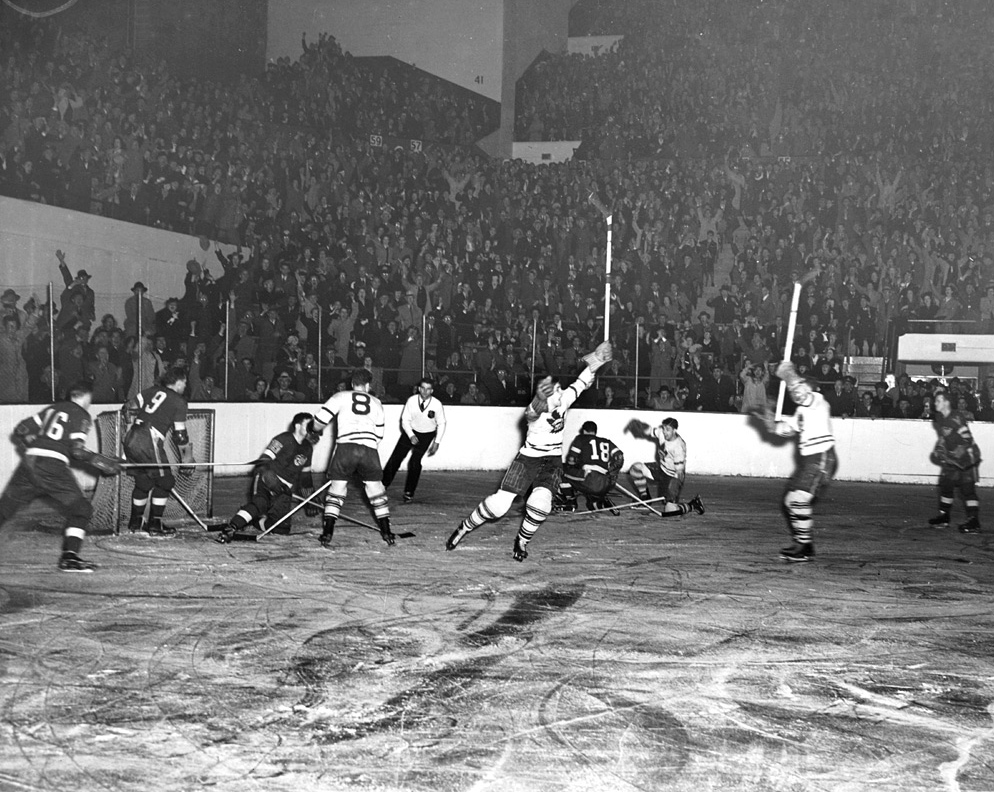
A Maple Leafs goal during the series

This was a series that saw a remarkable comeback. Toronto came back from a 3–0 series deficit to win the best-of-seven Stanley Cup Final, commonly known as a "reverse sweep." The feat has only been duplicated three times in the Stanley Cup playoffs since, however not in the Stanley Cup Final.

The first game was held in Toronto. Detroit's Don Grosso opened the scoring in the second minute before John McCreedy tied it for Toronto. Sid Abel put the Wings ahead, only to have Sweeney Schriner tie it to leave the teams tied after the first period. Grosso scored again at the 14:11 mark of the second and the Wings held off the Leafs from there to win the opening game 3–2.

Detroit took the second game in Toronto by a score of 4–2. Don Grosso scored two goals again for the Red Wings. The Wings took the lead 2–0 after the first period on goals by Grosso and Mud Bruneteau. Schriner scored in the second for the Leafs to close the score to 2–1 after two periods. Grosso scored early in the third along with Gerry Brown to put the Wings ahead 4–1 before Wally Stanowski scored in the fifteenth minute for the Leafs. Detroit held off the Leafs from there to take the series lead 2–0.

In game three in Detroit, the Maple Leafs took an early 2–0 lead on goals by Lorne Carr, but the Wings evened the score before the end of the first period on goals by Gerry Brown and Joe Carveth. Late in the first period, Sid Abel had to leave the game with a possible fractured jaw. His replacement, Pat McReavy, scored the winning goal early in the second, and Syd Howe added another to put the Wings up 4–2 after two. Eddie Bush scored for the Wings in the third to push the final score to 5–2.

In the fourth game, held in Detroit, the Maple Leafs staved off elimination with a 4–3 victory. Toronto coach Hap Day pulled Gordie Drillon and Bucko McDonald, replacing them with Don Metz and Hank Goldup. There was no scoring in the first. Bruneteau and Abel scored to put the Wings ahead 2–0 before the second period was half over. The Leafs tied it up on goals by Bob Davidson and Carr to leave the teams even after two periods. Carl Liscombe scored in the fifth minute of the third to put the Wings ahead, but two minutes later Syl Apps tied it up. Nick Metz scored the winning goal for Toronto with seven minutes to play.

The game ended in a near-riot. In the final minute, Detroit's Eddie Wares drew a misconduct penalty and then a $50 fine for arguing and refusing to leave the ice. Referee Mel Harwood dropped the puck for the faceoff while Wares was still on the ice and promptly called a too-many-men penalty on Don Grosso. Grosso threw down his stick and gloves and was fined $25 by Harwood. At the end of the game Detroit coach Jack Adams then attacked Harwood, punching him in the face following an profanity-laced outburst. The fans booed the officiating, littering the ice with paper, peanuts, and even a woman's shoe. NHL president Frank Calder and referee Harwood were escorted out of the rink under police protection. Calder immediately suspended Adams indefinitely and imposed $100 fines on Grosso and Wares.

The teams returned to Toronto for the fifth game. Ebbie Goodfellow took over the coaching duties for the suspended Jack Adams. Leafs' coach Day had worked out Drillon and McDonald but chose to leave them out and his decision was vindicated. The game was a mismatch as the Leafs won 9–3 behind three goals and two assists from Don Metz. Nick Metz scored the first goal and Stanowski scored a second to put the Leafs ahead 2–0 after one period. In the second period, the Leafs scored five goals. Bob Goldham, followed by Schriner, Don Metz, Apps, and Don Metz again raised the score to 7–0 after two. In the third period, Howe put Detroit on the board but Don Metz and Apps scored before Alex Motter and Carl Liscombe scored for the Red Wings to finish the scoring.

Game six presented a chance for Detroit to win the Cup on home ice. Although the team had lost the momentum of the series, the Detroit players promised it would be a different outcome from game five, especially the first period, where the Wings had drawn penalties leading to two power-play goals by the Leafs. The teams both showed a lot of discipline in the game and no penalties were called. The closest to an incident came in the third period when Jack Stewart of the Wings and Bingo Kampman of the Leafs collided and almost came to blows. At that time a fan threw a three-pound perch to the ice.

The first period was described as "hard-hitting hockey" and the teams ended the period scoreless. Just 14 seconds after the start of the second, Don Metz stole the puck near the Detroit goal and beat Johnny Mowers to put the Leafs ahead. Turk Broda held off the Red Wings for the rest of the game to record the series' only shutout. Goldham and Billy Taylor scored goals 32 seconds apart late in the third period to clinch the game for the Maple Leafs, who now were being considered the favourites to win the series in the seventh game.

The seventh and deciding game drew 16,218 fans, the largest crowd to see a hockey game in Canada at that time and it was again a close game. Detroit survived a two-man disadvantage in the first period and the teams finished the period scoreless. Detroit's Syd Howe opened the scoring in the second period on a pretty passing play between Abel, Jimmy Orlando, and Howe. The Wings were determined to protect the lead and led after two periods 1–0. Toronto got its chance in the third period to tie the score when Orlando drew a tripping penalty on Apps. Just as the penalty expired, Schriner scored for Toronto in a goalmouth scramble to tie the game. After the goal, Toronto picked up the pace, eventually out-shooting Detroit 16–7 in the third. Pete Langelle scored the series winner two minutes later in another goalmouth scramble. Schhriner scored the third goal for the Leafs at the 16:13 mark to close out the scoring and the unprecedented comeback win was complete.

It was the first time a crowd of over 16,000 attended a hockey game in Canada. 16,218 fans squeezed into Maple Leaf Gardens and remained for an hour after the game waiting for the Leafs to reappear from the dressing room after the game. Coach Day, who had played for the Leafs in their last win in 1932, deadpanned "We won it the hard way." He was asked if he had any doubts during the series, and replied "I had my doubts right up until that final bell rang." Rookie Gaye Stewart, who had joined the club for the fifth game of the final, became the youngest player to win the Stanley Cup as he was still 18 years of age. John McCreedy completed his triple championship with the win. He was a member of the Winnipeg Monarchs' 1937 Memorial Cup win and won an Allan Cup with the Kirkland Lake Blue Devils.

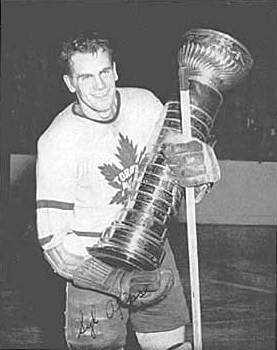
Syl Apps with the Stanley Cup

April 4	Detroit Red Wings	3–2	Toronto Maple Leafs	Maple Leaf Gardens	Recap
Don Grosso (5) - 1:38; Sid Abel (3) - 12:30		First period	6:36 - John McCreedy (4); 12:59 - Sweeney Schriner (2)
Don Grosso (6) - 14:11		Second period	No scoring
No scoring		Third period	No scoring
Johnny Mowers		Goalie stats	Turk Broda

April 7	Detroit Red Wings	4–2	Toronto Maple Leafs	Maple Leaf Gardens	Recap
Don Grosso (7) - 11:48; Mud Bruneteau (4) - 14:17		First period	No scoring
No scoring		Second period	11:13 - Sweeney Schriner (3)
Don Grosso (8) - 4:15; Gerry Brown (1) - pp - 10:08		Third period	13:40 - Wally Stanowski (1)
Johnny Mowers		Goalie stats	Turk Broda

April 9	Toronto Maple Leafs	2–5	Detroit Red Wings	Olympia Stadium	Recap
Lorne Carr (1) - 15:36; Lorne Carr (2) - 16:06		First period	18:20 - Gerry Brown (2); 18:40 - Joe Carveth (4)
No scoring		Second period	13:12 - Pat McReavy (1); 15:11 - Syd Howe (1)
No scoring		Third period	7:11 - Eddie Bush (1)
Turk Broda		Goalie stats	Johnny Mowers

April 12	Toronto Maple Leafs	4–3	Detroit Red Wings	Olympia Stadium	Recap
No scoring		First period	No scoring
Bob Davidson (1) - 13:54; Lorne Carr (3) - 15:20		Second period	1:32 - Mud Bruneteau (5); 9:08 - Sid Abel (4)
Syl Apps (3) - 6:15; Nick Metz (3) - 12:45		Third period	4:18 - Carl Liscombe (5)
Turk Broda		Goalie stats	Johnny Mowers

April 14	Detroit Red Wings	3–9	Toronto Maple Leafs	Maple Leaf Gardens	Recap
No scoring		First period	9:29 - pp - Nick Metz (4); 15:14 - pp - Wally Stanowski (2)
No scoring		Second period	1:59 - Bob Goldham (1); 4:11 - Sweeney Schriner (4); 14:11 - Don Metz (1); 14:28 - Syl Apps (4); 16:44 - sh - Don Metz (2)
Syd Howe (2) - 3:08; Alex Motter (1) - 14:03; Carl Liscombe (6) - pp - 15:45		Third period	5:36 - Don Metz (3); 9:25 - Syl Apps (5)
Johnny Mowers		Goalie stats	Turk Broda

April 16	Toronto Maple Leafs	3–0	Detroit Red Wings	Olympia Stadium	Recap
No scoring		First period	No scoring
Don Metz (4) - 00:14		Second period	No scoring
Bob Goldham (2) - 13:32; Billy Taylor (2) - 14:04		Third period	No scoring
Turk Broda		Goalie stats	Johnny Mowers

April 18	Detroit Red Wings	1–3	Toronto Maple Leafs	Maple Leaf Gardens	Recap
No scoring		First period	No scoring
Syd Howe (3) - 1:45		Second period	No scoring
No scoring		Third period	7:47 - Sweeney Schriner (5); 9:48 - Pete Langelle (3); 16:17 - Sweeney Schriner (6)
Johnny Mowers		Goalie stats	Turk Broda

Toronto won series 4–3

== Stanley Cup engraving ==
The 1942 Stanley Cup was presented to Maple Leafs captain Syl Apps by NHL President Frank Calder following the Maple Leafs 3–1 win over the Red Wings in Game Seven.

The following Maple Leafs players and staff had their names engraved on the Stanley Cup

1941–42 Toronto Maple Leafs

=== Players ===
Centres

- 8 Pete Langelle
- 10 Sylvanus "Syl" Apps Sr. (Captain)
- 21 Billy Taylor Sr.

Wingers

- 4 Bob Davidson
- 9 Lorne Carr
- 11 David "Sweeney" Schriner
- 12 Gord Drillon
- 14 John McCreedy
- 17 Nick Metz
- 18 Don Metz
- 20 Hank Goldup
- 21 Gaye Stewart

Defencemen

- 2 Bob Goldham
- 2 Wally Stanowski
- 3 Wilfred "Bucko" McDonald
- 5 Reg Hamilton
- 6 Rudolph "Bingo" Kampman
- 16 Ernie Dickens

Goaltenders

- 1 Walter "Turk" Broda

=== Coaching and administrative staff ===
- George Cottrelle (President/Owner), Ed Bickle (Vice President/Owners)
- William MacBrien, (Vice Presidents/Owners), Conn Smythe (Manager/Owner)
- Frank Selke Sr. (Acting Manager/Publicity Director), Clarence "Hap" Day (Coach)
- Tim Daly (Trainer)
- Hugh Smythe (Mascot)

=== Stanley Cup engraving ===
- Conn Smythe spent most of the year overseas fighting in World War II. Frank Selke Sr. was the acting Manager while Smythe was away. Smythe returned for the finals to help Toronto win the Stanley Cup.
- When the cup was redone during 1957–58, Walter "Turk" Broda was included on the cup twice with 1942 Toronto, once as WALTER BRODA, and once as TURK BRODA.
- John Bickell (Vice President/Owner) was excluded from the Stanley Cup. Bickell missed the whole season serving overseas in World War II, so his name was not included on the Stanley Cup.
- Gaye Stewart was 18 years, 9 months, and 21 days when he won his first Stanley Cup. He is still the youngest player to play in the Stanley Cup Final (see Larry Hillman 1955, youngest player to win the Stanley Cup). In 1943 Stewart was the first player to win the Stanley Cup one year and the Calder Trophy (Rookie of the Year) the next season.

== See also ==
- 1941–42 NHL season
- 1945 Stanley Cup Final
- 2024 Stanley Cup Final

Preceded by Boston Bruins; 1941	Toronto Maple Leafs; Stanley Cup champions 1942	Succeeded by Detroit Red Wings; 1943
