= Don Metz (ice hockey) =

Canadian ice hockey player (1916-2007)

- Born: January 10, 1916 Wilcox, Saskatchewan, Canada
- Died: November 16, 2007 (aged 91) Regina, Saskatchewan, Canada
- Height: 5 ft 10 in (178 cm)
- Weight: 165 lb (75 kg; 11 st 11 lb)
- Position: Right Wing
- Shot: Right
- Played for: Toronto Maple Leafs
- Playing career: 1938–1949

Donald Maurice Metz (January 10, 1916 – November 16, 2007) was a Canadian professional ice hockey right winger who played parts of nine seasons with the Toronto Maple Leafs of the National Hockey League from 1939 to 1949. While with the Maple Leafs he won the Stanley Cup five times. Born in Wilcox, Saskatchewan, he was the brother of Leafs teammate Nick Metz.

== Playing career ==
Metz was an integral part of the Leafs' come from behind victory in the 1942 Stanley Cup Final against the Detroit Red Wings. In game five, he scored three goals and two assists to lead the Leafs to a 9–3 victory. He also scored the game-winning goal in game six. What made Metz' accomplishment more successful is that he was not put in the lineup until the Leafs were down 3–0; the Leafs won all four games in which he was dressed. Metz finished the series with four goals and three assists.

The rest of his years were split between the Leafs and the AHL's Pittsburgh Hornets. He ended up playing 172 NHL games, scoring 20 goals and 35 assists for 55 points during the regular season.

== Career statistics ==
=== Regular season and playoffs ===
			Regular season					Playoffs
Season	Team	League	GP	G	A	Pts	PIM	GP	G	A	Pts	PIM
1935–36	Toronto St. Michael's Majors	OHA	10	9	4	13	5	5	3	0	3	8
1935–36	Toronto Goodyears	OHA Sr	13	6	3	9	4	9	3	4	7	10
1936–37	Toronto Goodyears	OHA Sr	9	3	2	5	6	5	0	2	2	6
1937–38	Toronto Goodyears	OHA Sr	16	20	22	42	4	6	6	2	8	2
1937–28	Toronto Goodyears	Al-Cup	—	—	—	—	—	4	1	1	2	6
1938–39	Toronto Goodyears	OHA Sr	18	15	16	31	8	5	4	5	9	0
1938–39	Toronto Goodyears	Al-Cup	—	—	—	—	—	10	12	3	15	17
1938–39	Toronto Maple Leafs	NHL	—	—	—	—	—	2	0	0	0	0
1939–40	Pittsburgh Hornets	AHL	32	13	25	38	10	7	2	2	4	4
1939–40	Toronto Maple Leafs	NHL	10	1	1	2	4	2	0	0	0	0
1940–41	Toronto Maple Leafs	NHL	33	4	10	14	6	7	1	1	2	2
1941–42	Toronto Maple Leafs	NHL	25	2	3	5	8	4	4	3	7	0
1942–43	Regina Army Corps	SSHL	24	43	26	69	12	5	10	4	14	6
1943–44	Toronto RCAF	TIHL	—	—	—	—	—	2	1	1	2	4
1944–45	Toronto Maple Leafs	NHL	—	—	—	—	—	11	0	1	1	4
1945–46	Pittsburgh Hornets	AHL	44	22	29	51	8	6	3	4	7	2
1945–46	Toronto Maple Leafs	NHL	3	1	0	1	0	—	—	—	—	—
1946–47	Pittsburgh Hornets	AHL	24	19	17	36	4	—	—	—	—	—
1946–47	Toronto Maple Leafs	NHL	40	4	9	13	10	11	2	3	5	4
1947–48	Pittsburgh Hornets	AHL	3	0	1	1	0	—	—	—	—	—
1947–48	Toronto Maple Leafs	NHL	26	4	6	10	2	2	0	0	0	2
1948–49	Pittsburgh Hornets	AHL	17	5	7	12	4	—	—	—	—	—
1948–49	Toronto Maple Leafs	NHL	33	4	6	10	12	3	0	0	0	0
NHL totals			170	20	35	55	42	42	7	8	15	12

== Awards ==
- Won the Stanley Cup in 1942, 1945, 1947, 1948, 1949

== See also ==
- Notable families in the NHL
