= Gerry Brown (ice hockey) =

Canadian ice hockey player

- Born: July 7, 1917 Edmonton, Alberta, Canada
- Died: August 18, 1998 (aged 81)
- Height: 5 ft 9 in (175 cm)
- Weight: 170 lb (77 kg; 12 st 2 lb)
- Position: Left Wing
- Shot: Left
- Played for: Detroit Red Wings; Earls Court Rangers
- Playing career: 1935–1952

Gerald William Joseph Brown (July 7, 1917 – August 18, 1998) was a Canadian ice hockey player who played 23 games in the National Hockey League with the Detroit Red Wings between 1942 and 1945. The rest of his career, which lasted from 1935 to 1952, was spent in the minor leagues. He was born in Edmonton, Alberta.

== Career statistics ==
=== Regular season and playoffs ===
			Regular season					Playoffs
Season	Team	League	GP	G	A	Pts	PIM	GP	G	A	Pts	PIM
1933–34	Edmonton Southsides	EJrHL	9	4	2	6	4	3	1	0	1	0
1934–35	Edmonton Southsides	EJrHL	11	10	3	13	15	6	1	3	4	4
1935–36	Edmonton Dominions	ESrHL	13	13	5	18	12	3	0	0	0	5
1936–37	Edmonton Dominions	ESrHL	26	21	18	39	28	6	3	3	6	2
1936–37	Edmonton Dominions	ASHL	20	21	18	39	28	—	—	—	—	—
1936–37	Edmonton Dominions	Al-Cup	—	—	—	—	—	8	6	1	7	13
1937–38	Earls Court Rangers	ENL	—	7	15	22	—	—	—	—	—	—
1938–39	Earls Court Rangers	ENL	—	21	9	30	—	—	—	—	—	—
1939–40	Cornwall Royals	QSHL	30	16	15	31	23	5	1	2	3	2
1940–41	Cornwall Royals	QSHL	36	18	22	40	35	4	1	1	2	0
1940–41	Montreal Concordia Civics	QSHL	2	0	0	0	0	—	—	—	—	—
1941–42	Detroit Red Wings	NHL	13	4	4	8	0	12	2	1	3	4
1941–42	Indianapolis Capitals	AHL	42	10	26	36	25	—	—	—	—	—
1945–46	Detroit Red Wings	NHL	10	0	1	1	2	—	—	—	—	—
1945–46	Indianapolis Capitals	AHL	48	28	25	53	22	5	0	1	1	4
1946–47	Buffalo Bisons	AHL	64	29	30	59	48	4	1	1	2	0
1947–48	Buffalo Bisons	AHL	67	25	43	68	45	8	2	3	5	8
1948–49	Hershey Bears	AHL	58	16	36	52	31	11	3	6	9	2
1949–50	Hershey Bears	AHL	70	19	35	54	16	—	—	—	—	—
1950–51	Hershey Bears	AHL	67	21	36	57	31	6	4	0	4	2
1951–52	Hershey Bears	AHL	68	26	28	54	38	5	1	3	4	0
AHL totals			484	174	259	433	256	39	11	14	25	16
NHL totals			23	4	5	9	2	12	2	1	3	4
