= Turk Broda =

Canadian ice hockey player (1914–1972)

- Hockey Hall of Fame, 1967
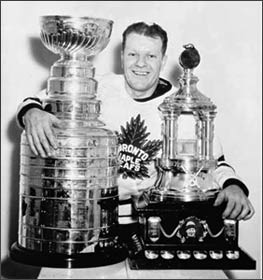
- Broda with the Stanley Cup and Vezina Trophy in 1948
- Born: May 15, 1914 Brandon, Manitoba, Canada
- Died: October 17, 1972 (aged 58) Toronto, Ontario, Canada
- Height: 5 ft 9 in (175 cm)
- Weight: 180 lb (82 kg; 12 st 12 lb)
- Position: Goaltender
- Caught: Left
- Played for: Toronto Maple Leafs
- Playing career: 1935–1943; 1946–1951

Walter Edward "Turk" Broda (May 15, 1914 — October 17, 1972) was a Canadian professional ice hockey player and coach. A goaltender, Broda played his entire career for the Toronto Maple Leafs of the National Hockey League (NHL) between 1936 and 1951, taking a hiatus from 1943 to 1946 to fight in the Second World War. The 1940-41 season saw him win his first Vezina Trophy with a GAA of 2.00 to go along with being named to the NHL First All-Star Team. The following season saw him backstop the team to the Stanley Cup championship, recording a shutout and a record of 8-5.

Broda added another Vezina Trophy and First All-Star Team selection in 1948 while winning four more Stanley Cups. He was the first goaltender to reach 300 wins, doing so in 1950. After retiring from active play, Broda coached minor league and junior ice hockey teams. In 2017 Broda was named one of the '100 Greatest NHL Players' in history.

== Personal life ==
Broda was born in Brandon, Manitoba to a Ukrainian family. Although he is commonly referred to as Polish by mistake (to the extent of him being inducted into the National Polish American Sports Hall of Fame in 2005), Publicity Director Stan Obodiac of the Maple Leafs, who knew Broda, dispelled this and confirmed Broda's Ukrainian origin.

Broda acquired the nickname of "Turkey Egg" during his school days in Brandon because of his many freckles. "Turkey Egg" soon became "Turk", and the name followed him.

== Playing career ==
=== Early career ===
Broda started his playing career with the Brandon Athletics and the Brandon Native Sons. After playing a few years with them he played for the Winnipeg Monarchs, Detroit Farm Crest and the Toronto St. Michael's Majors. In 1933–34, the Detroit Red Wings invited Turk Broda to their training camp. But with Normie Smith and John Ross Roach already in Detroit, there was no way Broda could start in the NHL. Instead, he started his professional career with the Detroit Olympics.

In 1933 Broda also appeared in goal for the Riding Mountain Relief Camp All-Stars, a group of hockey players from various Depression work camps around the lake by Riding Mountain National Park in Manitoba.

=== NHL career ===
In 1935–36, he was acquired by the Toronto Maple Leafs for $7500. Broda emerged as one of the league's top goaltenders in the 1940–41 season, as he led the league in wins with 28 in 48 games. In 1942, he won his first Stanley Cup with the Leafs, who came back from being down three games to none against the Detroit Red Wings in one of the greatest comebacks in NHL history.

In 1942–43, Broda joined the Canadian Army for two and a half years during World War II where he was stationed overseas in England, largely entertaining troops by playing military hockey to boost the morale of Allied troops before being honourably discharged in 1945.

In 1945–46, Turk Broda returned to the Maple Leafs roster and was instrumental in the team's Stanley Cup victories in 1947, 1948, 1949 and in 1951. Turk Broda retired in 1951–52, at 38 years of age.

=== "Battle of the Bulge" ===
The "Battle of the Bulge" was a battle between him and the owner of the Toronto Maple Leafs Conn Smythe about Broda losing weight. This argument brought a lot of attention from the media in Toronto, Ontario. Smythe ordered Broda to lose 10 pounds (4.5 kg) in a week and brought Al Rollins and Gilles Mayer from the minor leagues just to pressure Broda into losing weight. If Broda could not lose weight, then he would be removed from his goalkeeping duties. In the end, Broda lost enough weight to keep his job, though Broda admitted years later that the scales were rigged in his favour.

== Legacy ==
After retiring, Broda became a coach. He coached the Ottawa Senators in the Quebec Hockey League. He later became the head coach of the Toronto Marlboros. He led the Marlboros to back to back Memorial Cup championships in 1955, and in 1956.

Broda was inducted into the Hockey Hall of Fame in 1967 and was inducted into the Manitoba Sports Hall of Fame and Museum in 1983 as an "Honoured" member. In 1998, he was ranked number 60 on The Hockey News' list of the 100 Greatest Hockey Players. With 13 shutouts and a GAA of 1.98 in the playoffs, he helped the Leafs win 5 Stanley Cups and establish a dynasty. In 2005, Broda was inducted into the National Polish American Sports Hall of Fame. He died in 1972 at the age of 58 after suffering a massive heart attack.

== Awards and achievements ==
- Turnbull Cup MJHL Championship (1933)
- Calder Cup Championship (1936)
- Vezina Trophy (1941 and 1948)
- NHL First All-Star Team Goalie (1941 and 1948)
- Stanley Cup Championship (1942, 1947, 1948, 1949, and 1951)
- NHL Second All-Star Team Goalie (1942)
- In 1998, he was ranked number 60 on The Hockey News' list of the 100 Greatest Hockey Players
- Inducted into the Hockey Hall of Fame in 1967.
- Honoured Member of the Manitoba Hockey Hall of Fame
- Inducted into the Manitoba Sports Hall of Fame and Museum in 1983
- #1 jersey retired by the Toronto Maple Leafs
- In January, 2017, Broda was part of the first group of players to be named one of the '100 Greatest NHL Players' in history.

== Career statistics ==
=== Regular season and playoffs ===
			Regular season								Playoffs
Season	Team	League	GP	W	L	T	Min	GA	SO	GAA	GP	W	L	T	Min	GA	SO	GAA
1931–32	Brandon Athletics	MAHA	—	—	—	—	—	—	—	—	—	—	—	—	—	—	—	—
1932–33	Brandon Native Sons	MJHL	—	—	—	—	—	—	—	—	—	—	—	—	—	—	—	—
1932–33	Brandon Native Sons	M-Cup	—	—	—	—	—	—	—	—	7	2	2	3	460	9	0	1.17
1933–34	Winnipeg Monarchs	MJHL	12	1	11	0	720	51	0	4.25	—	—	—	—	—	—	—	—
1933–34	Winnipeg Monarchs	MHL	1	0	1	0	60	6	0	6.00	—	—	—	—	—	—	—	—
1934–35	Detroit Farm Crest	MOHL	2	1	1	0	120	4	0	2.00	—	—	—	—	—	—	—	—
1935–36	Detroit Olympics	IAHL	47	26	18	3	2890	101	6	2.10	6	6	0	—	365	8	1	1.32
1936–37	Toronto Maple Leafs	NHL	45	22	19	4	2770	106	3	2.30	2	0	2	—	133	5	0	2.26
1937–38	Toronto Maple Leafs	NHL	48	24	15	9	2980	127	6	2.56	7	4	3	—	452	13	1	1.73
1938–39	Toronto Maple Leafs	NHL	48	19	20	9	2990	107	8	2.15	10	5	5	—	617	20	0	1.94
1939–40	Toronto Maple Leafs	NHL	47	25	17	5	2900	108	4	2.23	10	6	4	—	657	19	1	1.74
1940–41	Toronto Maple Leafs	NHL	48	28	14	6	2970	99	5	2.00	7	3	4	—	438	15	0	2.05
1941–42	Toronto Maple Leafs	NHL	48	27	18	3	2960	136	6	2.76	13	8	5	—	780	31	1	2.38
1942–43	Toronto Maple Leafs	NHL	50	22	19	9	3000	159	1	3.18	6	2	4	—	439	20	0	2.73
1945–46	Toronto Maple Leafs	NHL	15	6	6	3	900	53	0	3.53	—	—	—	—	—	—	—	—
1946–47	Toronto Maple Leafs	NHL	60	31	19	10	3600	172	4	2.87	11	8	3	—	680	27	1	2.31
1947–48	Toronto Maple Leafs	NHL	60	32	15	13	3600	143	5	2.38	9	8	1	—	557	20	1	2.15
1948–49	Toronto Maple Leafs	NHL	60	22	25	13	3600	161	5	2.68	9	8	1	—	574	15	1	1.57
1949–50	Toronto Maple Leafs	NHL	68	30	25	12	4040	167	9	2.48	7	3	4	—	450	10	3	1.33
1950–51	Toronto Maple Leafs	NHL	31	14	11	5	1827	68	6	2.23	8	5	1	—	492	9	2	1.10
1951–52	Toronto Maple Leafs	NHL	1	0	1	0	30	3	0	6.00	2	0	2	—	120	7	0	3.50
NHL totals			629	302	224	101	38,167	1,609	62	2.53	101	60	39	—	6,389	211	11	1.98

== See also ==
- List of NHL goaltenders with 300 wins
- List of NHL players who spent their entire career with one franchise

Preceded by David Kerr	Winner of the Vezina Trophy; 1941	Succeeded by Frank Brimsek
Preceded by Bill Durnan	Winner of the Vezina Trophy; 1948	Succeeded by Bill Durnan
