= Hap Day =

Canadian ice hockey player (1901–1990)

- Hockey Hall of Fame, 1961
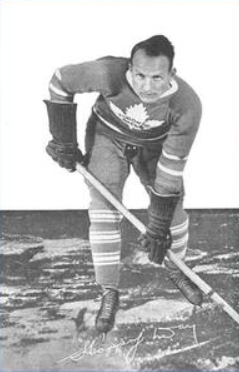
- Born: June 14, 1901 Owen Sound, Ontario, Canada
- Died: February 17, 1990 (aged 88) St. Thomas, Ontario, Canada
- Height: 5 ft 11 in (180 cm)
- Weight: 175 lb (79 kg; 12 st 7 lb)
- Position: Defence
- Shot: Left
- Played for: Toronto St. Patricks; Toronto Maple Leafs; New York Americans
- Playing career: 1924–1938

Clarence Henry "Happy" Day (June 14, 1901 – February 17, 1990) was a Canadian professional hockey player who played 14 seasons in the National Hockey League for the Toronto Maple Leafs and New York Americans. Day spent 33 years in the NHL as a player, referee, coach and assistant general manager, 28 of which were spent in various capacities with the Maple Leafs. He was inducted into the Hockey Hall of Fame in 1961.

His name was included on the Stanley Cup seven times, all with Toronto: 1932 (as Captain), 1942, 1945, 1947, 1948, 1949 (as coach) and 1951 (as assistant manager).

== Early life ==
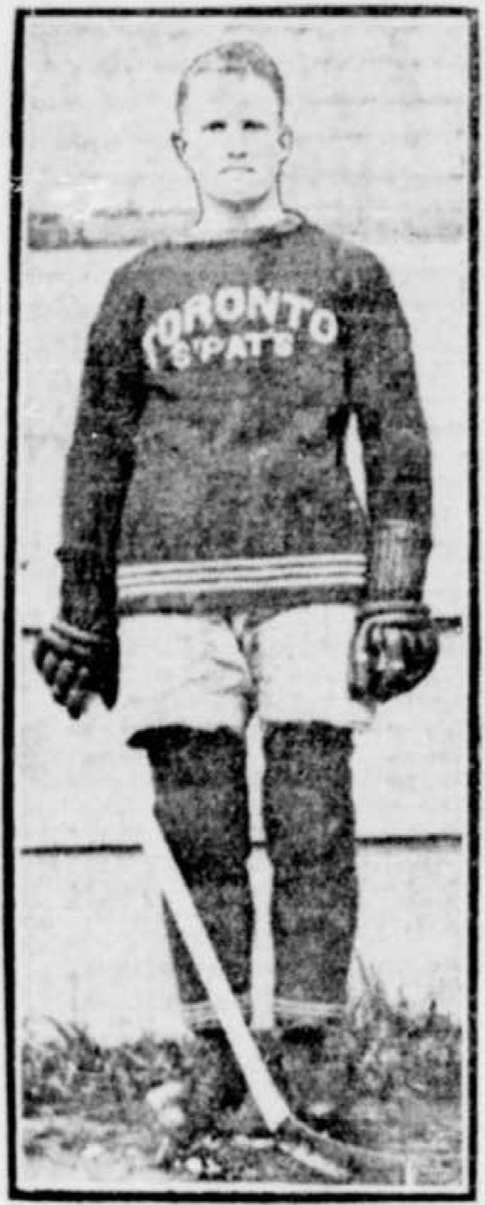
Day as member of the Toronto St. Pats

Day was born in Owen Sound, Ontario. During his teenage years, his family moved to Port McNicoll, Ontario, a small village outside Midland, Ontario. While developing his early hockey skills, Day skated with the Midland Juniors, and while attending Midland High School, wore the uniform of its hockey team. Legend has it he would often walk from Port McNicoll to Midland (approximately three kilometres away) in the winter, for games at the town's Casino Rink.

Day played senior lacrosse in Hamilton, Ontario in the early 1920s. He was teammates and roommates with future professional hockey players Carson Cooper, and future Canadian Amateur Hockey Association president Frank Sargent.

== Career ==
He played for the Hamilton Tigers of the Ontario Hockey Association in 1922–23 and 1923–24 then joined the varsity team at the University of Toronto, where he was enrolled as a pharmacy major.

Day was persuaded to turn professional in 1924 by Charlie Querrie, owner of the Toronto St. Pats. He played left wing in his rookie season and then switched to defence, where he would remain for the rest of his career. He became team captain in 1926.

In 1927, the St. Pats were purchased by Conn Smythe and renamed the Toronto Maple Leafs. Smythe kept Day as team captain. He also became a partner in Smythe's sand and gravel business. After Smythe acquired star defenceman King Clancy from the Ottawa Senators in 1931, Day and Clancy formed one of the top defence pairings in the NHL. The team won the Stanley Cup in 1932. While still playing for the Leafs, Day became coach of the West Toronto Nationals OHA junior team and led them to a Memorial Cup victory in 1936. On September 23, 1937, Day was sold to the New York Americans and spent one season there before retiring as a player in 1938. His 11-year tenure as captain of the St. Pats/Maple Leafs is second only to George Armstrong.

Day worked as a referee for the next two years before returning to the Leafs as coach. He guided the team through the 1940s, winning the Stanley Cup five times in 10 seasons. He was the winningest coach in Maple Leafs history until Punch Imlach passed him; Day still ranks second on the franchise wins list behind Imlach.

After 26 years at ice level in the NHL, Day became assistant general manager of the Leafs in 1950. His name was engraved on the cup a 7th time in 1951. In 1955, Smythe delegated most day-to-day control over hockey operations to Day, but remained general manager on paper. Just after the Leafs were eliminated in the playoffs in March 1957, Day was publicly embarrassed by Smythe, who told the media that he didn't know if Day was available to return to the Leafs for the following season. Officially, Day resigned, but behind the scenes he had been pushed out and was replaced by a committee headed by Smythe's son Stafford Smythe.

== Later life ==
Day retired to enter business life, running Elgin Handles in St. Thomas, Ontario until selling it to his son in 1977. Jack Kent Cooke, the founding owner of the Los Angeles Kings, almost convinced Day to become the team's first general manager in 1967, but Day decided not to take the job, recommending Larry Regan instead.

Day died in St. Thomas at age 88 in 1990. He and his number 4 were honoured (but not retired) by the Maple Leafs on October 4, 2006 at the Air Canada Centre. However, in 2016, the Maple Leafs retired his number, as part of their Centennial season celebrations.

== Career statistics ==
=== Regular season and playoffs ===
			Regular season					Playoffs
Season	Team	League	GP	G	A	Pts	PIM	GP	G	A	Pts	PIM
1921–22	Collingwood	OHA Jr	—	—	—	—	—	—	—	—	—	—
1922–23	Hamilton Tigers	OHA Sr	11	4	11	15	4	2	0	0	0	0
1923–24	Hamilton Tigers	OHA Sr	10	6	11	17	—	2	1	1	2	2
1924–25	Toronto St. Patricks	NHL	26	10	12	22	27	—	—	—	—	—
1925–26	Toronto St. Patricks	NHL	36	14	2	16	26	—	—	—	—	—
1926–27	Toronto Maple Leafs	NHL	44	11	5	16	50	—	—	—	—	—
1927–28	Toronto Maple Leafs	NHL	27	9	8	17	48	—	—	—	—	—
1928–29	Toronto Maple Leafs	NHL	44	6	6	12	85	4	1	0	1	4
1929–30	Toronto Maple Leafs	NHL	43	7	14	21	77	—	—	—	—	—
1930–31	Toronto Maple Leafs	NHL	44	1	13	14	56	2	0	3	3	7
1931–32	Toronto Maple Leafs	NHL	47	7	8	15	33	7	3	3	6	6
1932–33	Toronto Maple Leafs	NHL	47	6	14	20	46	9	0	1	1	21
1933–34	Toronto Maple Leafs	NHL	48	9	10	19	35	5	0	0	0	6
1934–35	Toronto Maple Leafs	NHL	45	2	4	6	38	7	0	0	0	4
1935–36	Toronto Maple Leafs	NHL	44	1	13	14	41	9	0	0	0	8
1936–37	Toronto Maple Leafs	NHL	48	3	4	7	20	2	0	0	0	0
1937–38	New York Americans	NHL	43	0	3	3	14	6	0	0	0	0
NHL totals			586	86	116	202	596	51	4	7	11	56

== Coaching record ==
Team	Year	Regular season						Postseason			
Team	Year	G	W	L	T	Pts	Finish	W	L	Win%	Result
TOR	1940–41	48	28	14	6	62	2nd in NHL	3	4	.429	Lost in Semifinals (BOS)
TOR	1941–42	48	27	18	3	57	2nd in NHL	8	5	.615	Won Stanley Cup (DET)
TOR	1942–43	50	22	19	9	53	3rd in NHL	2	4	.333	Lost in semifinals (DET)
TOR	1943–44	50	23	23	4	50	3rd in NHL	1	4	.200	Lost in semifinals (MTL)
TOR	1944–45	50	24	22	4	52	3rd in NHL	8	5	.615	Won Stanley Cup (DET)
TOR	1945–46	50	19	24	7	45	5th in NHL	—	—	—	Did not qualify
TOR	1946–47	60	31	19	10	72	2nd in NHL	8	3	.727	Won Stanley Cup (MTL)
TOR	1947–48	60	32	15	13	77	1st in NHL	8	1	.889	Won Stanley Cup (DET)
TOR	1948–49	60	22	25	13	57	4th in NHL	8	1	.889	Won Stanley Cup (DET)
TOR	1949–50	70	31	27	12	74	3rd in NHL	3	4	.429	Lost in semifinals (DET)
Total		546	259	206	81	599		49	31	.613	9 playoff appearances 5 Stanley Cup titles

Preceded by Bert Corbeau	Toronto Maple Leafs captain 1927–37	Succeeded by Charlie Conacher
Preceded by Dick Irvin	Head coach of the Toronto Maple Leafs; 1940–50	Succeeded by Joe Primeau
Preceded by Conn Smythe	General manager of the Toronto Maple Leafs; 1955–57 (shared with Conn Smythe)	Succeeded by Stafford Smythe (de facto)
