= George Cottrelle =

George Richardson Cottrelle (March 2, 1879 – January 1, 1953) was born and raised in the former Township of Esquesing, which is now the Town of Milton. After graduating from the Ontario Agricultural College, he spent some years working for the Department of Agriculture, before joining the Canadian Bank of Commerce in 1925, where he became a Bank Director from 1938 to 1953.

Cottrelle served on several boards including: Maple Leaf Gardens, Abitibi Power and Paper Company and the Royal Agricultural Winter Fair. He was an executive with the Toronto Maple Leafs in the 1930s and 1940s, and helped to finance the building of Maple Leaf Gardens in Downtown Toronto (on the northwest corner of Carlton Street and Church Street) in 1931. His name is inscribed on the Stanley Cup with the Maple Leafs for their victory in 1942. He was a banker by profession and was appointed Oil Controller for Canada on June 29, 1940, by the wartime government of MacKenzie King on the recommendation of his Minister of Transport C. D. Howe. This was described as "the toughest of all jobs during the war," but Cottrelle was appointed as an officer of the Order of the British Empire for his service to Canada through his position. On February 22, 2014, George R. Cottrelle was inducted into the Milton Walk Of Fame.
