= 1948 Stanley Cup Final =

1948 ice hockey championship series

	1	2	3	4	Total
Toronto Maple Leafs	5	4	2	7	4
Detroit Red Wings	3	2	0	2	0
- Location(s): Toronto: Maple Leaf Gardens (1, 2); Detroit: Olympia Stadium (3, 4)
- Coaches: Toronto: Hap Day; Detroit: Tommy Ivan
- Captains: Toronto: Syl Apps; Detroit: Sid Abel
- Dates: April 7–14, 1948
- Series-winning goal: Harry Watson (11:13, first)
- Hall of Famers: Maple Leafs: Syl Apps (1961); Max Bentley (1966); Turk Broda (1967); Ted Kennedy (1966); Harry Watson (1994); Red Wings: Sid Abel (1969); Gordie Howe (1972); Red Kelly (1969); Ted Lindsay (1966); Harry Lumley (1980); Bill Quackenbush (1976); Jack Stewart (1964); Coaches: Hap Day (1961, player); Tommy Ivan (1974)

The 1948 Stanley Cup Final was a best-of-seven series between the Detroit Red Wings and the defending champion Toronto Maple Leafs. The Maple Leafs swept the Red Wings to win their second consecutive Stanley Cup and seventh overall.

== Paths to the Finals ==
Detroit defeated the New York Rangers 4–2 to advance to the Finals. Toronto defeated the Boston Bruins 4–1 to advance to the Finals.

== Game summaries ==
This was the Stanley Cup debut series for Detroit's Gordie Howe, and the last for Toronto's Syl Apps who retired after the series.

April 7	Detroit Red Wings	3–5	Toronto Maple Leafs	Maple Leaf Gardens	Recap
Jim McFadden (5) - 7:20		First period	8:21 - Harry Watson (1); 9:04 - Joe Klukay (1); 18:24 - Syl Apps (3)
No scoring		Second period	14:31 - Gus Mortson (1); 19:21 - Howie Meeker (2)
Jim Conacher (2) - 4:28; Ted Lindsay (3) - 5:25		Third period	No scoring
Harry Lumley		Goalie stats	Turk Broda

April 10	Detroit Red Wings	2–4	Toronto Maple Leafs	Maple Leaf Gardens	Recap
No scoring		First period	13:31 - Max Bentley (3)
Pete Horeck (2) - 18:18		Second period	3:38 - pp - Bill Ezinicki (3); 17:16 - pp - Max Bentley (4); 18:50 - Harry Watson (2)
Fern Gauthier (1) - pp - 17:18		Third period	No scoring
Harry Lumley		Goalie stats	Turk Broda

April 11	Toronto Maple Leafs	2–0	Detroit Red Wings	Olympia Stadium	Recap
No scoring		First period	No scoring
Harry Watson (3) - 19:42		Second period	No scoring
Vic Lynn (2) - 15:16		Third period	No scoring
Turk Broda		Goalie stats	Harry Lumley

April 14	Toronto Maple Leafs	7–2	Detroit Red Wings	Olympia Stadium	Recap
Ted Kennedy (7) - pp - 2:51; Garth Boesch (2) - sh - 5:03; Harry Watson (4) - 11:13		First period	No scoring
Syl Apps (4) - 4:26; Ted Kennedy (8) - 9:42; Harry Watson (5) - sh - 11:38		Second period	2:41 - Leo Reise (2)
Les Costello (2) - pp - 14:37		Third period	18:48 - Pete Horeck (3)
Turk Broda		Goalie stats	Harry Lumley

Toronto won series 4–0

== Stanley Cup engraving ==
The 1948 Stanley Cup was presented to Maple Leafs captain Syl Apps by NHL President Clarence Campbell following the Maple Leafs 7–2 win over the Red Wings in game four.

The following Maple Leafs players and staff had their names engraved on the Stanley Cup

1947–48 Toronto Maple Leafs

=== Players ===
Centres

- 7 Max Bentley
- 9 Ted Teeder Kennedy (A)
- 10 Sylvanous Syl Apps Sr. (Captain)

Wingers

- 4 Harry Watson
- 5 Nick Metz (A)
- 11 Don Metz
- 12 Bill Ezinicki
- 14 Vic Lynn
- 15 Howie Meeker
- 16 Sid Smith
- 17 Joe Klukay
- 22 Les Costello

Defencemen

- 3 Wally Stanowski
- 18 Garth Boesch
- 19 Gus Mortson
- 20 Jimmy Thomson
- 21 Bill Barilko
- 23 Phil Samis

Goaltenders

- 1 Walter Turk Broda

=== Coaching and administrative staff ===
- Conn Smythe (President/Manager/Owner), George McCullach (Vice President)
- John Murdoch (Vice President), Jack Bickell (Director/Owner)
- Ed Bickle (Director/Owner), William MacBrien (Chairman/Owner)
- Robert Galloway (Team Doctor), Horance MacIntyre (Team Doctor)
- Ed Fitkin (Publicity Director), Tim Daly (Trainer)
- Archie Campbell (Asst. Trainer), George Walker (Chief Scout)
- Clarence Hap Day (Coach), Kerry Day (Mascot)

=== Stanley Cup engraving ===
When the Stanley Cup was redone in 1957–58, Robert J. Galloway's name was engraved as P.J. GALLOWAY. The "P" should be a "R". This mistake was repeated on the Replica Cup created in 1992–93.

- The Stanley Cup was getting too big it was reduced in size to a height 34 1/4 inches and 35 1/2 pounds. All the large rings were fit together so that 2 rings became 1 ring. The Stanley Cup was wider in size but smaller in height. The Stanley Cup had black spaces to include the winning team up to 1956.
- 1947 Toronto Maple Leafs winning members were finally added to the Stanley Cup in 1948.

== See also ==
- 1947–48 NHL season

== References and notes ==
- Diamond, Dan (2000). Total Stanley Cup. Toronto: Total Sports Canada. ISBN 978-1-892129-07-9.
- Podnieks, Andrew; Hockey Hall of Fame (2004). Lord Stanley's Cup. Bolton, Ont.: Fenn Pub. pp 12, 50. ISBN 978-1-55168-261-7
- "All-Time NHL Results". Archived from the original on July 24, 2017.

Preceded by Toronto Maple Leafs; 1947	Toronto Maple Leafs; Stanley Cup champions 1948	Succeeded by Toronto Maple Leafs; 1949
