= Dixie Outlet Mall =

Outlet mall in Canada

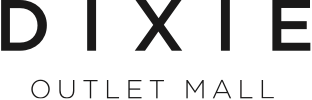
- Location: Mississauga, Ontario
- Coordinates: 43°35′35″N 79°34′12″W
- Address: 1250 South Service Road, Queen Elizabeth Way at Dixie Road
- Opened: 1956
- Manager: Cushman & Wakefield
- Owner: Slate Asset Management
- Num. of stores: 130
- Num. of anchor tenants: 7
- Floor area: 576,722 sq ft (53,579.2 m^{2})
- Floors: 1
- Website: dixieoutletmall.com

Dixie Outlet Mall, also referred to as Dixie Value Mall, is a shopping mall in Mississauga, Ontario, Canada, located on the south side of the Queen Elizabeth Way highway. It is Canada's largest enclosed outlet mall. It has several brand name outlets including Nike, Adidas, Boathouse, Calvin Klein, Guess, Puma, Tommy Hilfiger, Winners, Famous Footwear. Dixie Outlet Mall is owned by Slate Asset Management, and managed by Cushman & Wakefield, both Canadian firms.

== History ==
Former logo of Dixie Outlet Mall

It was opened in 1956 as Dixie Plaza, and was renamed Dixie Outlet Mall in the late 1980s after significant expansion and renovations took place. The name Dixie Plaza was adopted by another property in the 1980s. It was the first mall of its kind in Mississauga (then known as Toronto Township, or specifically, Lakeview) and is the oldest still in operation.

Established in 1976, the Fantastic Flea Market is the oldest flea market in Toronto. Located in the basement of the Dixie Outlet Mall, the flea market offers a diverse collection of items such as clothing, jewellery, video games, antiques and memorabilia, while also providing personal services including electronic and watch repairs.

In 1978, the Sayvette store was converted into a Knob Hill Farms. A new Burger King was added that year, and was scheduled to be a training centre for the chain's employees.

Dixie Outlet Mall is "100% Bullfrog Powered", meaning that it runs directly on clean and renewable electricity generated by wind and hydroelectric sources. Dixie Outlet Mall also provides many recycling stations throughout the mall. It was awarded the Gold Award by the Recycling Council of Ontario in 2010 for its efforts.

== Mall services ==
Dixie Outlet Mall offers services that include: ATMs, public telephones, Bike Racks, Child strollers, Mall-wide Wi-fi and wheel-chair accessible washrooms.

== Bus terminal ==
Dixie Outlet Mall
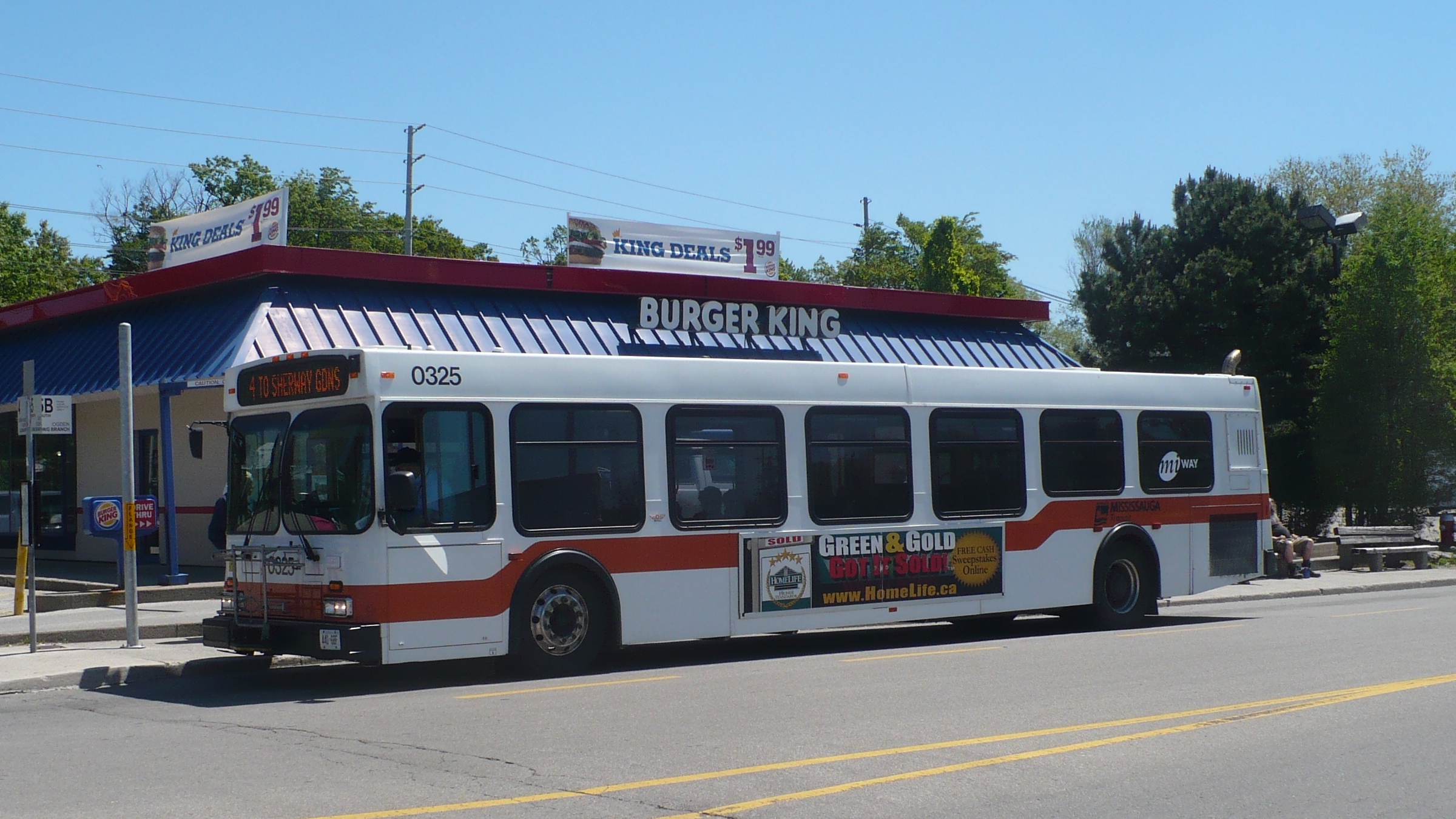

General information
- Location: 1490 Dixie Road, Mississauga ON
- Coordinates: 43°35′37.5″N 79°33′56″W
- Owner: City of Mississauga
- Platforms: 1 (curbside)
- Bus routes: 3
- Bus stands: 2
- Bus operators: MiWay

Construction
- Structure type: bus shelters (2) only
- Parking: none (mall parking for shoppers and restricted use)
- Cycle facilities: none (racks at select mall entrances)
Location

Dixie Outlet Mall is a MiWay bus terminal situated on the southeast end of the mall. The bus terminal, like most transit terminals in Mississauga, does not contain a building. Instead, it is composed of only two bus shelters and two benches. Also, it is not directly connected to the mall.

=== Bus routes ===
Bus service is exclusively by MiWay. All routes are wheelchair-accessible.

Route		Destination
4	North Service Road	Cooksville GO Station to Sherway Gardens via Huron Park and Mississauga Hospital
5	Dixie	Long Branch GO Station to Cardiff Boulevard
31	Ogden	Long Branch GO Station to Dixie GO Station

== See also ==
Other outlet malls in the Greater Toronto area:

- Vaughan Mills
- Toronto Premium Outlets
