= Steve Stavro =

Canadian businessman (1926–2006)

Steve Stavro CM
- Born: Manoli Stavroff Sholdas; September 27, 1926; Gavros, Greece
- Died: April 23, 2006 (aged 79); Toronto, Ontario, Canada
- Resting place: Mount Pleasant Cemetery
- Occupations: Grocer, businessman

Steve Atanas Stavro, CM (September 27, 1926 – April 23, 2006; born Manoli Stavroff Sholdas) was a Macedonian-Canadian businessman, grocery store magnate, Thoroughbred racehorse owner/breeder, sports team owner, and a noted philanthropist.

Under the leadership of Steve Stavro, what began as a single produce store in the east end of Toronto in 1954 grew into Knob Hill Farms, one of Canada's largest grocery chains all with only 10 locations in and around Toronto. Knob Hill Farm's Cambridge location, founded in 1991, had the honour of being the largest grocery store in the world at the time of its opening.

Stavro was also an avid sports fan and heavily involved with the Canadian sports scene, beginning in 1961 with the founding of the Eastern Canada Professional Soccer League together with George Gross. Stavro would go on to purchase the controlling interest in Maple Leaf Sports & Entertainment (MLSE) in 1994 making him the owner of the Toronto Maple Leafs. In 1998 MLSE would purchase Toronto's recently formed NBA team, the Toronto Raptors. This deal made Steve Stavro the principal owner of two of Toronto's three principal North American sports franchises. In addition, through this period, Stavro was instrumental in the construction of the new arena to house both the Toronto Maple Leafs and the Toronto Raptors, the Air Canada Centre (now called Scotiabank Arena).

Stavro's sports passions also included the world of horse racing. Stavro's interests began in 1967 with the purchase of two yearlings and the founding of Knob Hill Stables. Over the years the stables inventory swelled to a peak of over 80 horses on their roster. Stable standouts included Molson Million and Prince of Wales Stakes winner Benburb, Canadian International Stakes Winner Thornfield and Prince of Wales Stakes winner and Queen's Plate runner-up, Alezzandro.

In a speech to the Canadian Senate following Stavro's passing, Senator Trevor Eyton paid tribute to Steve's life and stated: "Steve Stavro's contributions to business and sport in Canada will not be forgotten. He was a man that followed his passions and a man of self-made success coming from hard work and determination."

== Personal life and Knob Hill founding ==
Born in the village of Gavros in Western Macedonia, Greece, Stavro and some family members immigrated to Toronto during the Great Depression in 1933. The family reunited with his father, who had come to Canada in 1927. Stavro and his sister, Gloria, attended Duke of Connaught Public School and Riverdale Collegiate Institute. They also attended Bulgarian language classes at Sts. Cyril & Methody Macedono-Bulgarian Orthodox Church, where Stavro's parents were active members. He worked in his father's store, Louis' Meat Market, in Toronto's east end at Queen Street and Coxwell Avenue and left school after Grade 10 to work full-time.

In 1951, he opened his own fresh produce stand across the street under the Knob Hill Farms name. Stavro said he took the name from a box of produce from California. By 1954, he was running his own traditional grocery store at 425-427 Danforth Avenue. By the late 1950s, Stavro was operating nine grocery stores and outdoor markets in Toronto.

== Knob Hill Farms ==
Steve Stavro, founder of Knob Hill Farms, was a serial innovator and one of the early adopters of the concept of a big box retailer. Knob Hill Farms bought in very large volumes to secure maximum discounts from brokers, wholesalers and farm co-operatives. Knob Hill Farms advertised heavily in Toronto area newspapers and customers flocked to the stores for prices, wide selection and the unique experience. The decision to purchase stock in bulk necessitated the construction of "food terminals" that were significantly larger than any competitors at the time. Over the years Knob Hill Farms would construct the largest grocery store in Ontario, then Canada, followed by North America and finally the world with the construction of Knob Hill Farms' Cambridge terminal in 1991. Knob Hill Farms' stores were located close to major transportation arteries for the delivery of bulk goods (and the convenience of the driving public) and many of the stores were serviced directly by railway spur lines (and one directly accessed the Port of Toronto on Lake Ontario).

As a result of Knob Hill Farms large individual store sales volumes and the frequent occurrence of customers leaving with bulky orders, Knob Hill Farms adopted a company-wide policy of providing their customers first with large, re-usable, cardboard boxes (for five cents each) and then with sturdy, re-usable plastic baskets, to take their groceries home. These baskets held significantly more than any paper or plastic grocery bags. This initiative represented one of the first examples of a retailer abandoning plastic and paper bags in favour of a reusable and environmentally friendly alternative.

Stavro brought a focus to purchasing from local farms, where seasonally appropriate, both to decrease transportation costs and to support local business. In addition to purchasing local products, Knob Hill Farms developed relationships with brokers, wholesalers and suppliers around the world to cater to Toronto's rapidly growing multicultural immigrant communities. Knob Hill Farms was especially notable for its large selection of Continental European, South Asian and Caribbean products.

Stavro opened his first food terminal in December 1963 (a 65,000 square foot (6,000 square metre) store). It was located just north of Toronto at Woodbine Avenue and Highway 7 in Markham, Ontario. (At the time of its opening, the Markham location was Canada's biggest grocery store.)

Eight years later, on August 4, 1971, Stavro opened a second terminal in Pickering, Ontario – immediately to the east of Toronto. With each store opening it became customary for Stavro to hold events for large industry groups, including brokers, wholesales and manufacturers. This store opening was also noteworthy for the arrival of Sam Walton, founder of Walmart and Sam's Club, who drove in from New York to meet with Steve Stavro. Following the Pickering terminal Stavro opened his third terminal, the first in Toronto, on September 3, 1975. The terminal was located at Lansdowne Avenue and Dundas Street West, on a site previously occupied by a National Cash Register plant. A second Toronto terminal opened on February 2, 1977, at Cherry Street and the Gardiner Expressway.

The fifth store, billed as the largest food store in North America, opened November 1, 1978 at Dixie Road and the Queen Elizabeth Way in Mississauga – immediately to the west of Toronto. This was the first store in the chain to sell some non-food products and was initially two stories tall. The second storey was later closed to customers and used for storage. A restaurant, drug store, and wine shop all rented space within the building.

On June 29, 1983, Knob Hill Farms opened a location in Oshawa, Ontario in the former Ontario Malleable Iron Company Limited's factory. The building had been used as an iron foundry since 1898, although the company had operated at that site since 1872. The 226,000 square foot (21,000 square metre) building had railway spurs for both Canadian Pacific and Canadian National Railway lines running right to the store. A pharmacy, bakery, dentist's office, video rental store, wine store, and a card shop were among the other businesses initially located within the terminal. The Ontario Municipal Board and the Ontario government approved a 12-acre (5 ha) site in 1982 for the seventh Knob Hill Farms terminal, this one at Weston Road and Highway 401 in the Weston community of Toronto. For this opening a team of executives from The Kroger Company, the largest supermarket chain in the US, flew in on a company jet for the opening. The site was previously an industrial building dating back to the 1930s and was used for the assembly of airplanes (de Havilland Mosquitos) by Massey Harris during World War II. The 325,000 square foot (30,200 square metre) store opened May 14, 1986. Features of the supermarket included a man-made waterfall, rides for children and a variety of shops. The store also featured John Richmond's 1,300 foot (400 metre) mural depicting the history of food from Prometheus to Marc Garneau.

In 1984 Knob Hill Farms purchased 1900 Eglinton Ave. East from General Electric on the closing of its factory. The plan was to construct a new food terminal catering to the Scarborough community. This plan, however, was opposed by some members of the local community and led by the area alderman, a real estate broker, who felt the terminal would be "too disruptive to the existing fabric of development". In 1987 the application for development was formally turned down. The denial came as somewhat of a surprise forcing Knob Hill Farms to pivot its strategy for the location, turning it into a wholesale retailer on the north side of the building and the south side of the building became Knob Hill Farms' head office.

On August 21, 1991, Knob Hill Farms opened a terminal in Cambridge Ontario, the first outside the Greater Toronto Area. The terminal measured 340,000 square feet (31,500 square metres), making it the largest food retail store in the world. It was estimated that the terminal saw over 20,000 customers on opening day with hour long lines and traffic jams surrounding the store. The Store featured 5,250 feet (1,600 metres) of refrigeration units, a 500-foot (150 metre) meat counter and 1,500 parking spaces. An interesting facet of the terminal also was the partnership with the local Mennonite community. 8,000 square feet (750 square metres) of the store was devoted to the sale of homemade Mennonite furniture and fabric, while the parking lot featured a five buggy hitching post to accommodate the Mennonites' horse and buggy travel.

The final Knob Hill terminal, the Riverdale Terminal, opened in 1992. The terminal was located at the Carlaw and Gerrard intersection in Toronto.

In August 2000, Stavro announced that all stores would close. At the time, the company had about 800 employees at 10 locations. Knob Hill Farms had lost market share to new competitors, including Walmart and Costco and existing competitors such as Loblaws. In addition, Knob Hill Farms had incurred significant debts. The final store — the Weston site — closed in February 2001 and Stavro ensured that all debts were repaid in full, including termination payments to all employees.

== Stavro and soccer ==
Stavro's first venture into professional soccer was in 1961 when he, together with George Gross and others, founded the Eastern Canada Professional Soccer League. This league was a four team league with representation from Hamilton, Montreal, and two Toronto teams, the Toronto Italia, which moved from the National Soccer League, and Toronto City, a brand new endeavour. After formation, Stavro and Gross travelled to the United Kingdom seeking to sign stars to play for Toronto City in their off-season and to bring star power to the new league. Stavro and Gross returned with the signatures of goalkeeper and Scottish captain Tommy Younger and forward Jackie Mudie, England and Fulham captain Johnny Haynes, and Northern Irish and Tottenham Hostspur captain Danny Blanchflower. These players were each stars in their own right, but the biggest move, however, was the signing of Stanley Matthews, a legend of the game, and the only player to be knighted while actively playing. It was also the last time that England, Scotland and Northern Ireland captains played on the same team.

The league got under way in the spring of 1961, with 16,509 people gathering in Varsity Stadium to watch Toronto City take on Toronto Italia. City would go on to win the league that year, but lose in the semi-finals of the playoffs. The following year the English Football Association stepped in and banned players from playing for other teams during their summer breaks, which ended Toronto City's strategy of acquiring big name stars.

In 1966 Stavro helped form the United Soccer Association and entered a team also called Toronto City in the new league. The United Soccer Association originally intended to launch its league in the spring of 1968, but a rival league, the National Professional Soccer League, announced it was ready to launch in 1967. Not wanting to lose ground to its rival, the Association decided to fast track its launch. Without any players of its own, the Association opted to import whole teams from Europe and South America, which would represent the franchises during the inaugural season, giving them time to build their own squads for the following season. Toronto City was represented by Hibernian of the Scottish Football League. The team played 12 games in the 1967 season with six being home games played at Varsity Stadium. Their record for the year was four wins, three losses and five ties to finish third in their division, failing to qualify for the playoffs. In December 1967 the United Soccer Association and the National Professional Soccer League merged to form the North American Soccer League. As a result of this merger some of the Association's franchises, including Toronto City, folded, in part to avoid cities having more than one club in the new league with City losing out to its National Professional Soccer League rival the Toronto Falcons. Stavro sold his team back to the league for $160,000.

Summing up Stavro's contribution to Canadian soccer, Senator Trevor Eyton stated that: "Steve was involved in the management of the Continental Soccer League, the International Soccer League, the Eastern Canada Professional Soccer League, the United Soccer Association and the North American Soccer League. As a result of this support and contribution to soccer in Canada, Steve was honoured as a life member of the Canadian Soccer Association." In addition, in recognition of Stavro's contribution to Canadian soccer he was inducted into the Canadian Soccer Hall of Fame in 2005 as an "honoured builder" of the sport.

== Knob Hill Stable ==
Stavro's interest in horse racing began in 1967 when he acquired a pair of yearlings – Boy Bandit and Danforth Dan. They were conditioned by J. C. Meyer. However, it wasn't until the early 1980s that Stavro became passionate about thoroughbreds. As his passion grew, he founded Knob Hill Stable in Newmarket Ontario. At the peak of Knob Hill Stables, there were more than 60 horses which included 15 or more racers at Woodbine Racetrack.

To further grow Knob Hill Stables prospects Stavro purchased a 300-acre (120 ha) farm in Kentucky in 1988. Stavro had begun to take a bigger interest in not only racing horses, but breeding them as well. The Kentucky farm was used for training in the winter, but more importantly, served as the main location for Knob Hill Stables breeding operations. 1988 was also an important year for Knob Hill Stables due to the success of its thoroughbred Granacus. That year Granacus won the Grade I Blue Grass Stakes at Keeneland Race Course and finished the year winning $300,000 of prize money. The following year Granacus continued his success, starting six races, finishing in the top three all but one time. For the year Granacus ended with winnings of $228,755 In 1992 Knob Hill Stables had its breakout year. That year it won nine stakes races with six different horses and netted $1.8 million in stake winnings. Of the Knob Hill Stables horses, it was their three year old Benburb, bred by the stable, which emerged as the most promising thoroughbred. In the early part of the season Benburb upset Queen's Plate winner Alydeed on a muddy track to win the Prince of Wales Stakes. The win generally surprised the Canadian racing community and began to attract national attention to Benburb and the stable. Later in the year Benburb had another upset win, this one in the GR2 Molson Export Million. In the race Benburb knocked off a blue-chip field that included eventual U.S. Horse of the Year A.P. Indy, Alydeed, and GR1 winner Technology. The win was the highest stake victory a Knob Hill Horse had ever achieved and helped to cement Stavro as one of the premiere Canadian stable owners. At the end of the 1992 season Benburb was selected as the Sovereign Award winner for the Canadian Horse of the Year as well as Champion 3-year-old male honours.

In 1995, Knob Hill Stables bred Schossberg, started five races finishing in first on three occasions. Notably, the five-year-old thoroughbred captured the Philip H. Iselin Handicap and the Salvator Mile Handicap. For the 1995 season Schossberg finished with earnings of $293,000.

For the remainder of the decade Knob Hill Stables experienced moderate success, winning some smaller stakes races, but a major win proved elusive. Their fortunes changed, however, in 1999, with the success of the Knob Hill Stable bred 5-year-old Thornfield. Thornfield started six races and won three, including the major Canadian International Stakes which carried a US$1 Million purse. The win was a major upset as Thornfield started the race as the longest shot on the board, further cementing Knob Hill Stables reputation as both a superior breeding stable and as frequent upset artists. As a result of his performance in the 1999 season Thornfield won the Sovereign Award for horse of the year and Champion Grass Horse.

In the early 2000s Knob Hill Stables experienced moderate success, with 20 horses accumulating career earnings of US$70,000 or more, however, only two horses achieved graded stakes wins, Chopinina and Saoirse.

After Stavro's death in 2006, his estate assumed the management of Knob Hill Stable, looking to carry on Stavro's legacy and love of horse racing. That year Stavro was posthumously inducted into the Canadian Racing Hall of Fame. The 2006 season would prove to be successful for the stables largely due to one of the horses Stavro purchased at the Keeneland Yearling Sale, Leonnatus Anteas. Named after one of Alexander the Great's body guards the two year old horse would go on to win all three races he entered, with each race being on a different track surface. For his efforts Leonnatus was voted 2006 Sovereign Award Champion for 2-Year-Old Horse. Leonnatus quickly emerged as one of the more promising Canadian racing horses and began the 2007 season with high expectations. He was a winterbook favorite for the Queens Plate race; however, he could not race due to an infection in his pastern. The three-year-old colt made his next start in the September 15 Super Derby at Louisiana Downs in Bossier City, Louisiana, finishing fourth.

Even with Leonnatus' injuries, the 2007 season was one of the most successful in the history of Knob Hill Stables. Leading the charge was the Knob Hill Stables bred three-year-old Alezzandro, a derivative of the name of Stavro's hero, Alexander the Great. That year Alezzandro won the Prince of Wales Stake and finished second in the Queen's Plate, a goal that Stavro strived for his entire life. Alezzandro finished the year 65th in earnings for all of North America and received the Sovereign Award for Champion 3-Year-Old Colt. For the 2007 season Knob Hill Stables finished with US$1,247,000 in earnings, the second highest earnings in their history.

In 2008 Knob Hill Stables saw less success than years prior. Their only major stake win for the season was Nicki Knew which won the Boston City Stake. Overall the Stables' earnings were down to US$608,000. The 2008 season would be the last season that Knob Hill Stables won a major stake competition. Over the next four years the breeding program Stavro championed would slow and overall stable inventory dropped sharply. The horses still racing were mainly holdovers from the 2007/2008 season. 2012 would be the last year that the Stable entered horses into racing competitions.

In its 40-year career Knob Hill Stable proved to be one of the premiere Canadian stables. Throughout its history it produced 85 stakes winners that raced throughout North America and Europe. Knob Hill Stables remains one of the few Canadian stables to win the Thoroughbred Owners and Breeders Association award for the top owner horse breeder in North America.

== Toronto Maple Leafs – Maple Leaf Sports and Entertainment ==
Steve Stavro's interest in hockey started many decades before he would eventually become the majority owner of the Toronto Maple Leafs. In 1962 his grocery store sponsored the Toronto Knob Hill Farms junior ice hockey team in the fledgling Metro Junior A League. While the league would only last two seasons it featured a number of future hockey stars, including a 14 year old Bobby Orr.

Stavro's next foray into Toronto hockey management was in 1973 when he purchased a minority interest in the Toronto Toros hockey club of the World Hockey Association. Although the Toros team would move to Birmingham, Alabama, after the 1976 season, Stavro's tenure with the team would provide valuable sports management experience for his future endeavors.

A long-time friend of Toronto Maple Leafs' majority owner, Harold Ballard, Stavro had served as a director of Maple Leaf Gardens Ltd. Together with the other two Maple Leaf Gardens' directors, Don Giffin, and Don Crump, Stavro served as an executor of the Ballard estate following Ballard's death on April 11, 1990. In the period between Ballard's death and October 1991, Stavro, Giffin and Crump assumed all management responsibilities for the entire organization. At that time, Stavro became chairman of the board of Maple Leaf Gardens Ltd. and Governor of the Toronto Maple Leafs hockey club.

In the same year, Stavro repaid a $20 million loan that had been extended to Ballard in 1980 by Molson Brewery, which also owned the Leafs' bitter rivals, the Montreal Canadiens. In return for repaying the loan, Stavro was granted an option to buy Maple Leaf Gardens Ltd.'s shares from Ballard's estate, equal to 60% of the total outstanding shares of Maple Leaf Gardens Ltd. In a separate transaction, Molson Brewery also agreed to sell its 20% stake in Maple Leaf Gardens Ltd. to Stavro. The purchase from Molson Brewery closed in 1994, and shortly thereafter Stavro bought the Ballard estate's shares for $34 a share, totalling $75 million. In the purchase from Ballard's estate, Stavro partnered with the Ontario Teachers' Pension Plan. Through this transaction, the Ontario Teachers' Pension Plan acquired 49% of the shares of Maple Leaf Gardens Ltd. and the balance of 51% was held by a holding company, MLG Holdings Limited (and that company was 80% owned by Stavro and 20% owned by TD Bank). The purchase was the subject to a review by the Ontario Securities Commission and a lawsuit from Ballard's son, Bill Ballard, and in the end, the deal stood.

In 1996 Stavro sold 25% of MLG Holdings Limited to Larry Tanenbaum's company, Kilmer Sports Inc., for a reported $21 million. Around this same time Maple Leaf Garden Ltd. began to show increased interest in moving locations from Maple Leaf Gardens, their home arena since 1931, as well as interest in acquiring Toronto's newly formed National Basketball Association (NBA) team, the Toronto Raptors.

At this time, the Raptors were looking to build a new arena, which was a condition of being granted a franchise by the NBA. The Raptors invited the Maple Leafs to be a tenant at the new arena they were constructing in downtown Toronto. Initially Maple Leaf Gardens Ltd. rebuffed the invitation because they concluded that "the footprint is too small". When Allan Slaight acquired control of the Toronto Raptors in late 1996, talks recommenced regarding the proposed joint use of the new proposed arena. Maple Leaf Gardens Ltd. proposed constructing a new $300 million shared arena on top of the rail tracks at Union Station and the land on which the Toronto Raptors were to build their new arena would become a bus terminal. This proposal died when an agreement could not be reached with the City of Toronto government on the rent for the land.

In November 1997, Maple Leaf Gardens Ltd. submitted a new proposal for a $250 million arena to be located at Exhibition Place. This would have been a hockey only facility as the Toronto Raptors had commenced construction of their own arena south of Union Station. Then, on February 12, 1998, after years of difficult negotiations, Maple Leaf Gardens Ltd. purchased 100% of both the Toronto Raptors and the new arena that was under construction, from Allan Slaight and the Bank of Nova Scotia. Maple Leaf Gardens Ltd. paid a reported CA$467 million for both assets, with $179 million attributable to the team and $288 million attributable to the arena under construction. Stavro personally took the lead in significantly revising and upgrading the arena as a top tier entertainment venue.

On February 20, 1999, the Air Canada Centre (now known as Scotiabank Arena ), was opened to the public. This opening marked a new era of Toronto Maple Leafs hockey. The first game at the new arena took place against historic rivals the Montreal Canadiens. The Toronto Maple Leafs would go on to win the game 3–2 on an overtime goal by Steve Thomas.

In the same year MLG Ventures Limited purchased all the remaining publicly traded shares of Maple Leaf Gardens Ltd. and took it private. Following this purchase Maple Leaf Gardens Ltd. and MLG Ventures Limited amalgamated to form Maple Leafs Sports & Entertainment Ltd. (MLSE). Following the creation of MLSE, Stavro continued to exercise control of the company through the following share structure. MLG Holdings Limited held a 51% interest in MLSE. Stavro owned 55% of this holding company and the minority shareholders were Kilmer Sports Inc. (25%) and TD Capital Group (20%). The remaining 49% of MLSE was owned by Ontario Teachers' Pension Plan. This tiered ownership structure gave Stavro effective control of MLSE with only a net 28% stake.

In contrast to Harold Ballard, who gained much media attention for his cantankerous behaviour and tendency to micromanage the Leafs, Stavro was a dignified man who preferred to stay out of the limelight. He almost never interfered in hockey operations, and mostly left management of the team to experienced executives and staff. The first period of hockey success was led by general manager Cliff Fletcher. In the 1992–93 campaign, the Maple Leafs had their first winning season in 14 years, coming within one game of the Stanley Cup Final. The Leafs again made the Conference Finals the following season. During the tenure of head coach and general manager Pat Quinn from 1999 to 2002, the team was an annual contender, clinching a Northeast Division title in the 1999–2000 season, notching the first two 100-point seasons in franchise history, and making two Eastern Conference Finals appearances. Stavro was also known in the local Macedonian community to have a friendly competition with fellow Macedonian Mike Ilitch who owned a rival NHL hockey team, the Detroit Red Wings. Stavro stepped down as Chairman of MLSE in 2003 in favour of Tanenbaum, as part of a restructuring plan that also saw his ownership stake sold to the Ontario Teachers' Pension Plan.

When Brad Duguid rose in the Ontario provincial legislature to pay tribute to Stavro on his passing, Duguid summarised Stavro's contribution to, and his passion for, developing a successful National Hockey League franchise as follows:

...clearly one of Steve Stavro's greatest passions was the Toronto Maple Leafs. Steve Stavro took over the Maple Leaf organization at a time when they had lost respect for their rich heritage. One of the first things he did was bring back the retired numbers and hang them proudly from the Maple Leaf Gardens' rafters. Under Stavro, the Leafs went from a club known for ignoring its alumni to one that showed honour and respect for those who wore the blue and white. Although Steve Stavro never achieved his ultimate goal of winning the Stanley Cup, the Leafs became a perennial contender once again. In short, he returned dignity to the Toronto Maple Leafs.

== Philanthropy ==
As well as being a notable businessman and sports owner, Steve Stavro was well known in the Toronto community for the charitable causes he championed, much of which was given without public recognition. As The Globe and Mail Chairman Kenneth Thompson said: "Steve was generous to a fault. His friendship and support embraced many grateful and needy recipients. He did not seek public recognition of this. The satisfaction of helping others was reward enough."

Stavro was also well known for his contributions to many major infrastructure projects in Toronto based hospitals. The most notable project was the 1988 construction of the Stavro Emergency Department in what is now the Michael Garron Hospital, located in the East York area of Toronto, Stavro's childhood neighbourhood. (His family foundation was subsequently the key donor in the refurbishment of the department in 2007.) Throughout the years the Stavro family foundation has continued to provide funding for this hospital. Stavro was also a frequent donor to various programs at the Mount Sinai and Wellesley hospitals in Toronto. One of the more prominent projects was the establishment at Mount Sinai hospital of the "Steve Atanas Stavro Familial Gastrointestinal Cancer Registry". As a result of this initiative individuals with a potential family history of gastrointestinal cancer can be more easily screened, providing opportunities for preventative measures to be implemented before development of cancer.

Stavro's commitment to the cause of healthcare was not only limited to the Toronto area. In 1987 the Stavro foundation provided funding for the construction of the "Neo-Natal Intensive Care Unit" of the Meir Hospital in Kfar Saba, Israel. The neo-natal unit was a major medical advance for the community as it allowed premature newborns to receive a much higher standard of care post birth, greatly increasing their odds of survival.

In addition to Stavro's major healthcare donations, he contributed broadly, including the arts (Toronto Symphony Orchestra, The National Ballet, and Art Gallery of Ontario), universities and high schools across Ontario, old age homes and a variety of community endeavours in Toronto. Particularly noteworthy was Knob Hill Farms longstanding partnership with the Royal Agricultural Winter Fair, a largely indoor agricultural fair held at Exhibition Place in Toronto. Knob Hill Farms sponsored a variety of different attractions at the fair including a designated "Knob Hill Lane" section that contained a number of displays as well as a petting zoo.

Stavro was also strongly committed to various multicultural communities within the Toronto region. As an example, in 1967, he contributed to the founding of Caribana (currently, the Toronto Caribbean Carnival). This festival is world renowned and considered one of the Toronto's summer highlights, regularly drawing well over 1 million people to North America's largest street festival.

Stavro's charitable giving continues through his family foundation. A recent donation led the YMCA of Greater Toronto to name its Kingston Road facility, which is currently under construction, The Steve & Sally Stavro Family YMCA. This new YMCA is slated to open in the second quarter of 2022.

== Honours ==
- Honorary lifetime director of the Royal Agricultural Winter Fair
- Honorary director of the Ontario Jockey Club
- 1993, TOBA Award as North American Thoroughbred Breeder of the Year
- 1992, Member of the Order of Canada
- 1992, City of Toronto Award of Merit
- 1992, Beth Sholom Brotherhood Humanitarian Award
- 1991, AHEPA Ellis Island Award of Distinction
- 1988, Decorated Knight Commander, Knights of Malta
- 1987, Man of the Year, Kupat Holim, Canadian chapter
- 1985, Canadian Award, John G. Diefenbaker Memorial Foundation
- 1980, The Knight of the Golden Pencil Award, Food Industry Association of Canada
- 2002, Queen Elizabeth II's Golden Jubilee Medal

== Other achievements ==
Stavro was a director of the Liquor Control Board of Ontario, a member of the executive committee of the Economic Council of Canada, a trustee of the Ontario Jockey Club, and honorary campaign chairman of Toronto East General Hospital Emergency Critical Care Fund (1987–1989).

Stavro was a founding sponsor of Canada's Sports Hall of Fame and a member of its advisory council, founding member of the Canadian Federation of Independent Grocers, corporate member of 4-H Canada, member of the board of directors of the John G. Diefenbaker Memorial Foundation, member of the advisory council for the Equine Research Centre, member of the Jockey Club of Canada, member of the Canadian Thoroughbred Horse Society, and a member of the Thoroughbred Owners and Breeders Association (TOBA) of Lexington, Kentucky.

== Notes ==
Preceded by Harold Ballard	Principal owner, Toronto Maple Leafs; 1991–2003 (as Chairman of Maple Leaf Sports and Entertainment after 1996)	Succeeded by Maple Leaf Sports & Entertainment
