= Sayvette =

Former Canadian discount department store

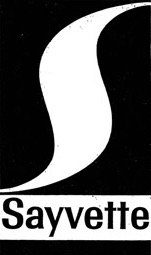
- Industry: Discount department store
- Founded: 1961
- Defunct: 1977
- Fate: Dissolution

Sayvette was a discount department store in Canada from 1961 to 1977. The chain was announced in February 1961, and launched its first store at Thorncliffe Market Place in a Toronto suburb (now East York Town Centre) that September. Over 70,000 customers passed through the first Sayvette on September 7, 1961. Sayvette City, at the southwest corner of Yonge Street and Steeles Avenue (now Centerpoint Mall), opened in November, claiming to have the largest retail space in Metropolitan Toronto. Sayvette carried St. Michael-branded goods from British department store Marks and Spencer.

The chain planned to have at least 20 stores across Canada. The company's main investor, American real-estate businessman Marvin Kratter, decided to sell one month after opening. Two more stores opened in 1962 (in Mississauga and in London). The chain lost $1.5 million that year in the face of competition from other discount department stores including the established Kresge, Woolworth and Zellers chains and from new entrants Banner, Disc Buy and Sentry.

In early 1965, Sayvette was taken over by Loblaw Companies Limited, a large grocery distribution and retail business. In May 1967, the company advertised itself as “the new Sayvette” with the slogan "If You Knew Sayvette a Little Better, You’d Like It a Lot More". The company's fortunes began to improve, and profitability led to new plans for expansion plans. In 1973, the chain had 11 stores in southern Ontario.

== Decline ==
During the recession of the mid-1970s, Sayvette's fortunes declined as it failed to establish its place between discounters like K-Mart and Woolco, and full department stores like Eaton's and Simpsons. In the summer of 1975, Sayvette closed its three Metropolitan Toronto stores (North York, East York and Scarborough), and its stores in Barrie (Bayfield Mall became Canadian Tire) and Mississauga Dixie Plaza became Knob Hill Farms locations. More store closings followed, and in December 1977, the last store, in Ajax (Harwood and Bayly), closed.

At one time, the company gave out small tokens or coins, similar to coupons. The tokens were octagonal, and were printed with the words: "Sayvette 1 (cent) ONE CENTE" in the centre and "REDEEMABLE FOR MERCHANDISE ONLY" around the edge in a circular fashion. They were a lightweight metal, possibly a brass-coloured aluminum. They were franked on each side with the same information. Customers could save up the tokens and were permitted to use a number of them at one time.

== Other locations ==
- Cambridge Shoppers Mall (Currently Tri-City Centre), Cambridge, Ontario
- Westmount Place Plaza, Waterloo, Ontario
- Wellington Road South, London, Ontario
- Tecumseh Mall, Windsor, Ontario
- Dixie Plaza, Mississauga, Ontario
- Harwood & Bayley, Ajax, Ontario
- Bayfield Mall, Barrie, Ontario

== See also ==
- List of Canadian department stores
