= John W. H. Bassett =

Canadian media proprietor and politician (1915–1998)

- Born: John White Hughes Bassett; August 25, 1915; Ottawa, Ontario, Canada
- Died: April 27, 1998 (aged 82); Toronto, Ontario, Canada
- Occupations: Media proprietor, politician
- Spouse(s): Eleanor Moira Bradley (m. April 26, 1938, div.); Isabel Glenthorne Macdonald (m. July 17, 1967)
- Children: John, Doug, and David
- Relatives: Carling Bassett (granddaughter)
- Awards: Order of Canada; Order of Ontario

John White Hughes Bassett, PC CC OOnt (August 25, 1915 – April 27, 1998) was a Canadian media proprietor.

Born in Ottawa, Ontario, he was the son of John Bassett (1886–1958), publisher of the Montreal Gazette, and Marion Avery (née Wright).

== Education ==
Bassett attended Ashbury College, Bishop's College School and graduated from Bishop's University with a BA in 1936.

== Politics ==
After fighting with the Army in World War II, Bassett ran unsuccessfully for the Progressive Conservative Party of Canada, in the 1945 Canadian election in the riding of Sherbrooke, losing to Liberal incumbent, Maurice Gingues. He also ran in the 1962 election in the riding of Spadina losing to Liberal candidate Perry Ryan by fewer than 2,000 votes.

== Publishing and broadcasting ==
He became a reporter for Toronto's The Globe and Mail newspaper after graduating from university. After World War II, he was hired by the Toronto Telegram as advertising director. His first experience in newspaper ownership was with the Sherbrooke Daily Record, which he bought from his father. In 1952, Bassett purchased part ownership of the Toronto Telegram. In 1960, he founded Telegram Corporation (later Baton Broadcasting) to run Toronto's first commercial television station, CFTO-TV. A few months later, he won the television rights to the Eastern Conference of the Canadian Football League. He needed a network in order to broadcast the games. The result was the Canadian Television Network, later to become CTV, with CFTO as the flagship station. Starting in the 1980s, Bassett began a drive to take over CTV by buying as many stations as possible. He succeeded in 1997, a year before his death.

== Sports ==
From 1957 to 1974, Bassett was the owner of the Toronto Argonauts, a team in the Canadian Football League.

In 1957, he was named to the "Silver Seven," a committee that oversaw hockey operations for the Toronto Maple Leafs. In 1961, longtime Maple Leafs owner Conn Smythe sold most of his shares in Maple Leaf Gardens Ltd. (which owned the Maple Leafs and Maple Leaf Gardens) to a partnership of his son Stafford, Toronto Marlboros president Harold Ballard and Bassett for $2.3 million. Smythe later claimed that he thought he was selling only to his son, but it is very unlikely that Stafford would have been able to raise the money on his own. Bassett became vice chairman of the Gardens' board of directors, ascending as chairman after Smythe resigned shortly after the Leaf’s won the Stanley Cup in 1962. Bassett's name appears on the Stanley Cup 4 times—in 1962, 1963, 1964, 1967.

In 1969, Ballard and Stafford Smythe were charged with tax evasion and accused of using Maple Leaf Gardens Ltd. to pay for their personal expenses. Bassett persuaded the board to fire Smythe as president and Ballard as executive vice president. The board elected Bassett as the new president.

However, Bassett did not force Smythe and Ballard to sell their shares, and they both remained on the board. This was a serious strategic blunder on Bassett's part; Smythe was still the largest shareholder, and he and Ballard controlled almost half the shares between them. A year later, Ballard and Smythe staged a proxy war to win back control. Faced with an untenable situation, Bassett resigned and sold his shares to Smythe and Ballard.

Bassett's son, John F. Bassett, would follow in his father's path of becoming a professional sports owner; the younger Bassett was a part owner of the World Hockey Association's Ottawa Nationals, Toronto Toros and Birmingham Bulls; the World Football League's Memphis Southmen and the United States Football League's Tampa Bay Bandits.

== Government ==
In 1989, he was appointed for a three-year term as chairman of the Security Intelligence Review Committee, an independent body that reports to the Parliament of Canada on the operations of the Canadian Security Intelligence Service. Due to the requirements under the Official Secrets Act, Bassett was sworn into the Queen's Privy Council for Canada.

== Family ==
Bassett married fellow Bishop's University graduate Eleanor Moira Bradley of Sherbrooke on April 26, 1938, in the university's St. Mark's Chapel. They had three children: John, Doug, and David. After their divorce, Bassett married Isabel Bassett on July 17, 1967. They had three children (Avery, Sarah, and Matthew) and remained together until his death.

In the 1970s, his son John F. Bassett was the owner of the Toronto Toros, a hockey team in the World Hockey Association. Former tennis star Carling Bassett-Seguso is Bassett's granddaughter.

== Honours ==
- 1985 - Made an Officer of the Order of Canada.
- 1988 - Appointed to the Order of Ontario.
- 1989 - Appointed to the Queen's Privy Council for Canada.
- 1992 - Promoted to Companion of the Order of Canada.
- 2000 - Inducted into the Canadian Broadcast Hall of Fame.
- 2003 - Inducted into the Canadian Business Hall of Fame.

== See also ==
- List of Bishop's College School alumni

Sporting positions
Preceded by Conn Smythe	Principal owner, Toronto Maple Leafs; 1961–1970 (with Stafford Smythe and Harold Ballard)	Succeeded by Stafford Smythe and Harold Ballard
Government offices
Preceded by Ron Atkey	Chair of the Security Intelligence Review Committee (Canada); 1989–1992	Succeeded by Jacques Courtois
