= Centerpoint Mall (Toronto) =

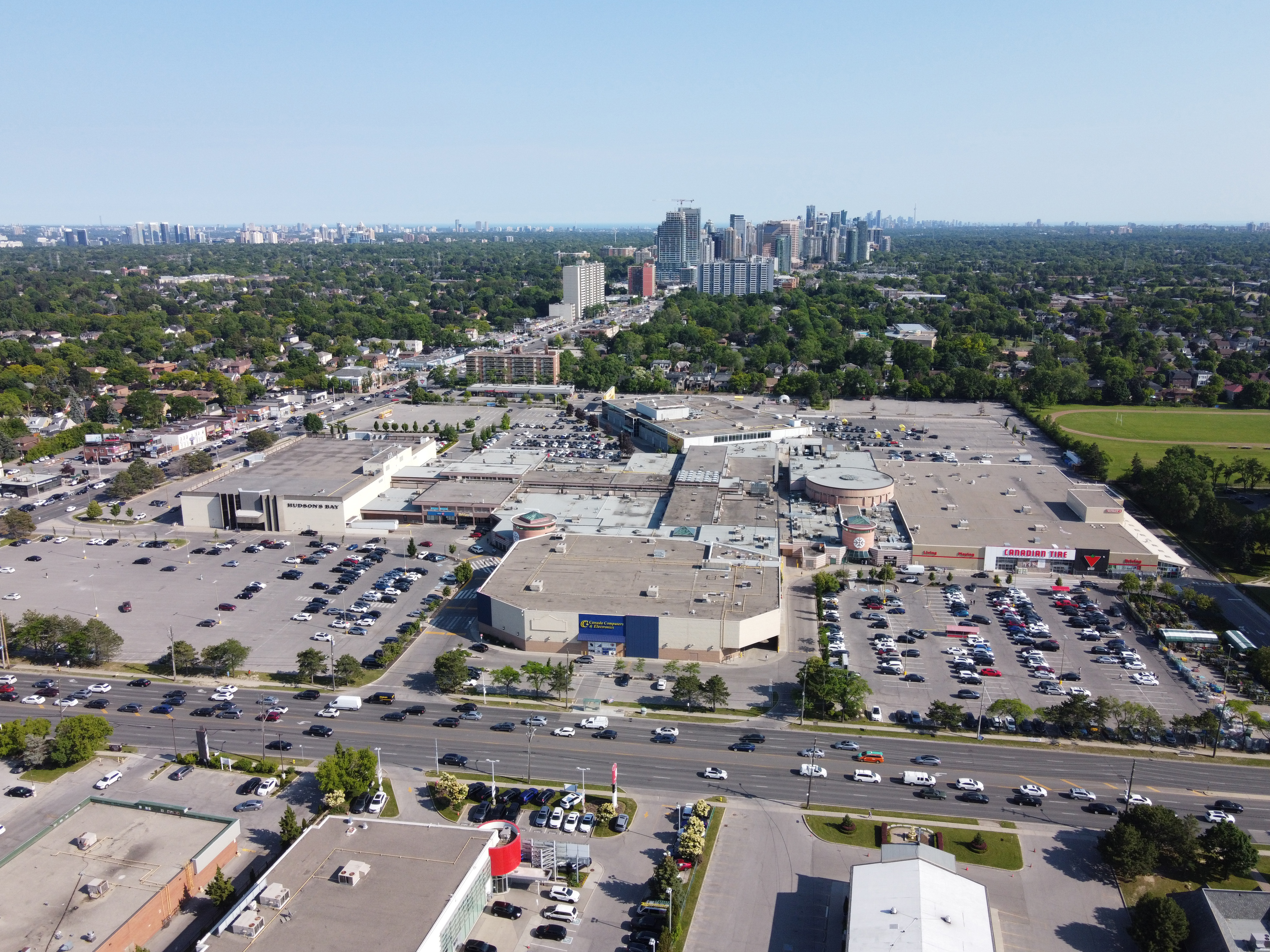
- Aerial view from the north
- Location: Toronto, Ontario, Canada
- Coordinates: 43.796°N 79.422°W
- Address: 6464 Yonge Street
- Opened: June 1, 1966
- Manager: Morguard
- Owner: Revenue Properties Company Limited
- Num. of stores: 144
- Num. of anchor tenants: 3
- Floor area: 58,100 m^{2} (625,000 sq ft)
- Floors: 1
- Parking: 2,258
- Website: Centerpoint Mall

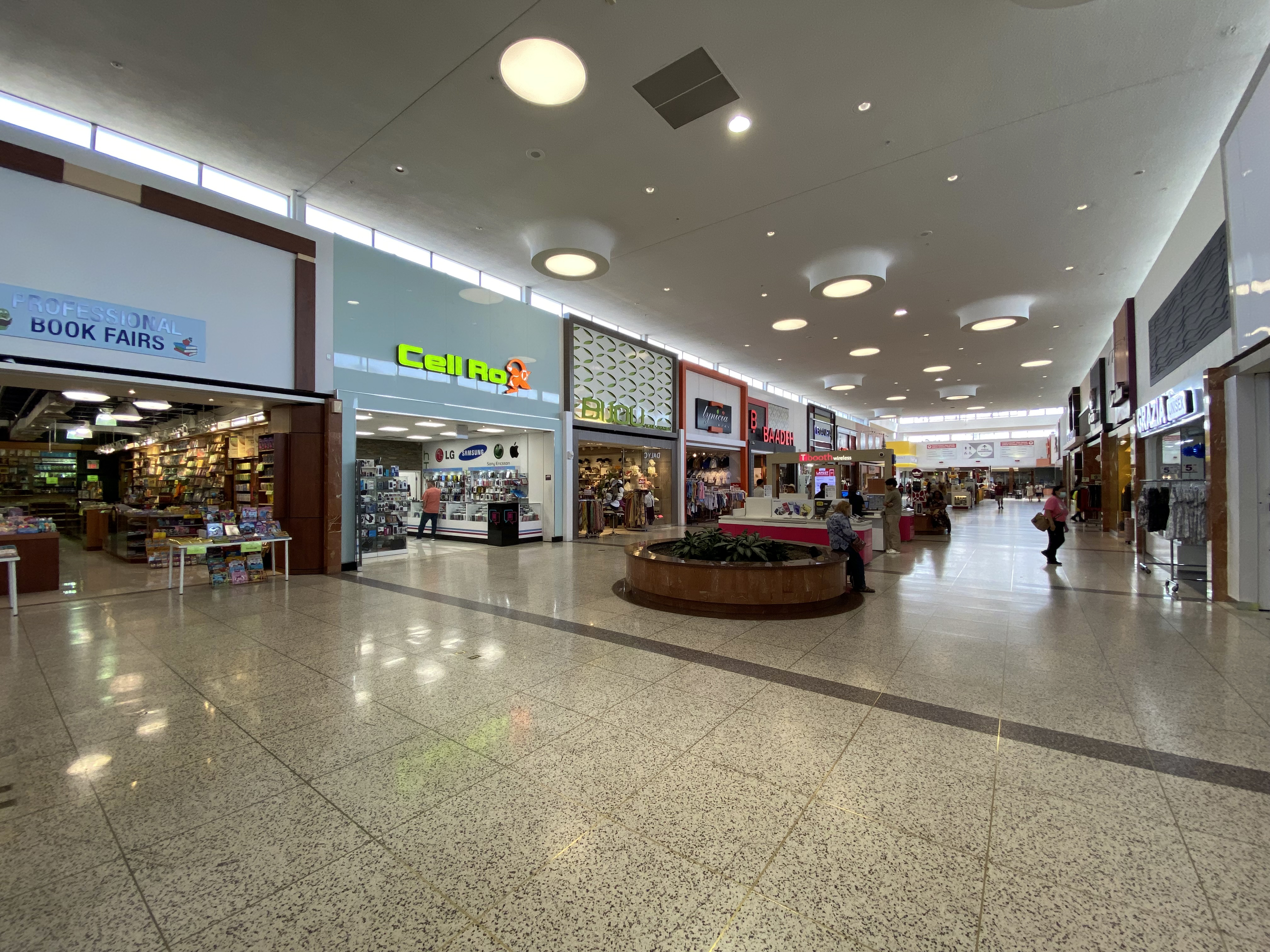
Mall interior

Centerpoint Mall (formerly Towne and Countrye Square) is a shopping mall located in Newtonbrook, a neighbourhood of Toronto, Ontario, Canada on the southwest corner of Steeles Avenue and Yonge Street at the boundary of Toronto. It contains 59,005 square metres (635,121 sq ft) of retail space.

The mall has a layout similar to a cross. Customers enter the Congee Queen from an exterior entrance only, as a doorway to the interior of the mall is only for staff and deliveries, allowing the Congee Queen to remain open separately from the rest of the mall. The supermarket is connected to the mall interior but shopping carts are blocked from entering the rest of the mall.

== History ==
It was originally known as Towne and Countrye Square at its grand opening in the 1960s as an enclosed mall. In 1966, the mall began operation with anchors Sayvette and Super City Discount Foods, later adding the Miracle Mart department store. Miracle Mart was converted to Canadian Tire. The Super City (later Loblaws) store was torn down and rebuilt as a two-storey Zellers. The Bay was added adjacent to Yonge Street in April 1974. The Sayvette chain went defunct in 1975 and was converted to Woolco. Woolco closed and the store was converted to a supermarket under the Loblaw Companies, first as a Super Centre, then to Loblaws, now it is a No Frills. The mall changed its name to Centerpoint Mall in 1990.

The Zellers closed in 2012 when the leasehold was purchased by Target. The location reopened as Target on March 19, 2013. In early 2015, all Target stores across Canada closed. A Lowe's home improvement store opened in the former Target store in late November 2016, but it had closed by the end of February 2019. Replacing the Lowe's, Canada Computers store has now been open since December 14, 2019, but only using the first floor of the anchor space.

On December 9, 2021, owners submitted an application to the city to permit the re-development of the property. They planned to demolish the mall over several years, with the aim of replacing it with "[a] network of new public and private streets and development blocks containing a mix of uses including residential, retail, office, a central public park, and privately-owned publicly accessible spaces".

After the Bay closed all remaining stores across Canada in June 2025, the two-storey department store building stood abandoned on the east side of the mall until 2026 when demolition started on it to accommodate construction of the Yonge North subway extension.

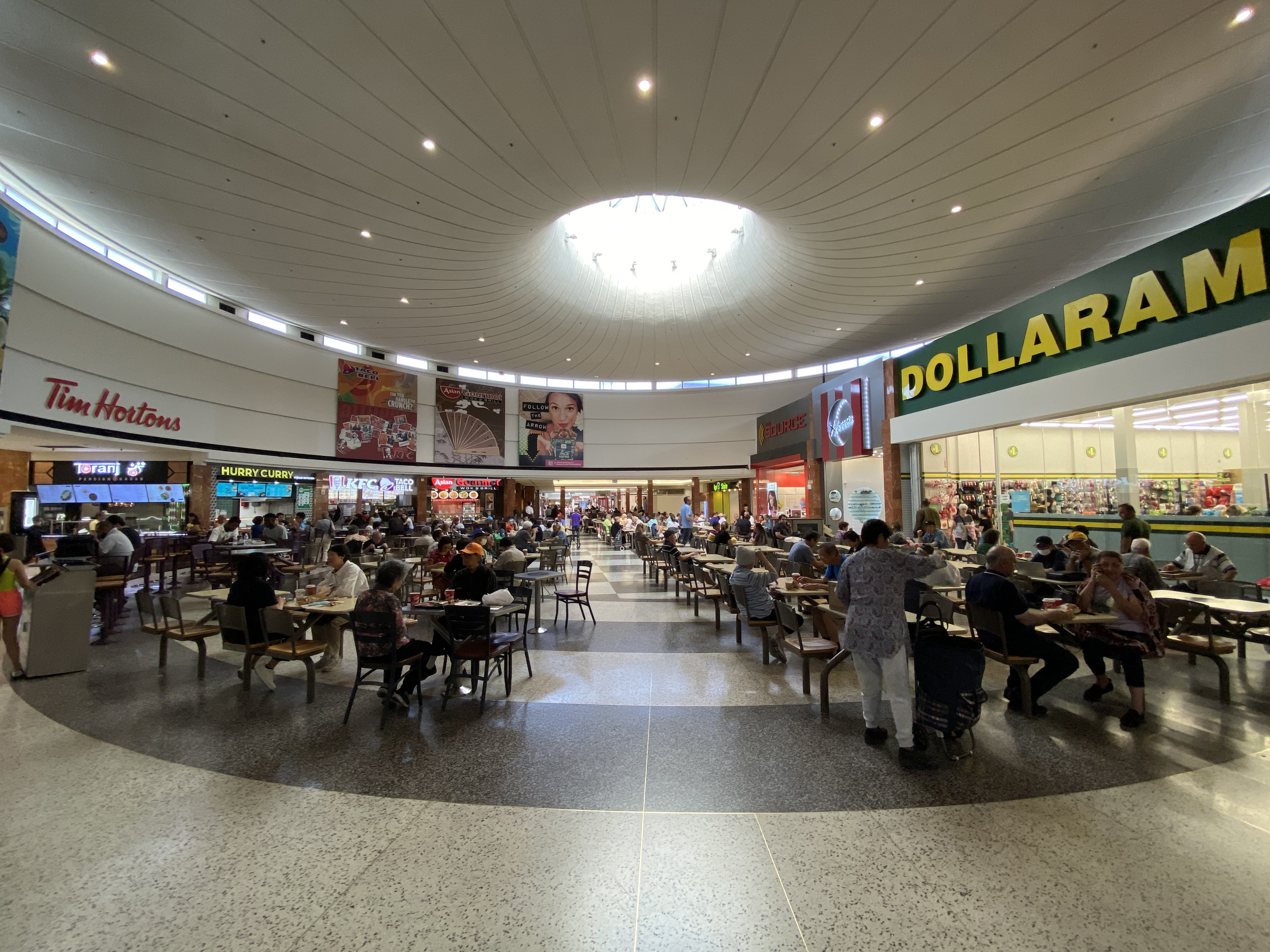
Food court

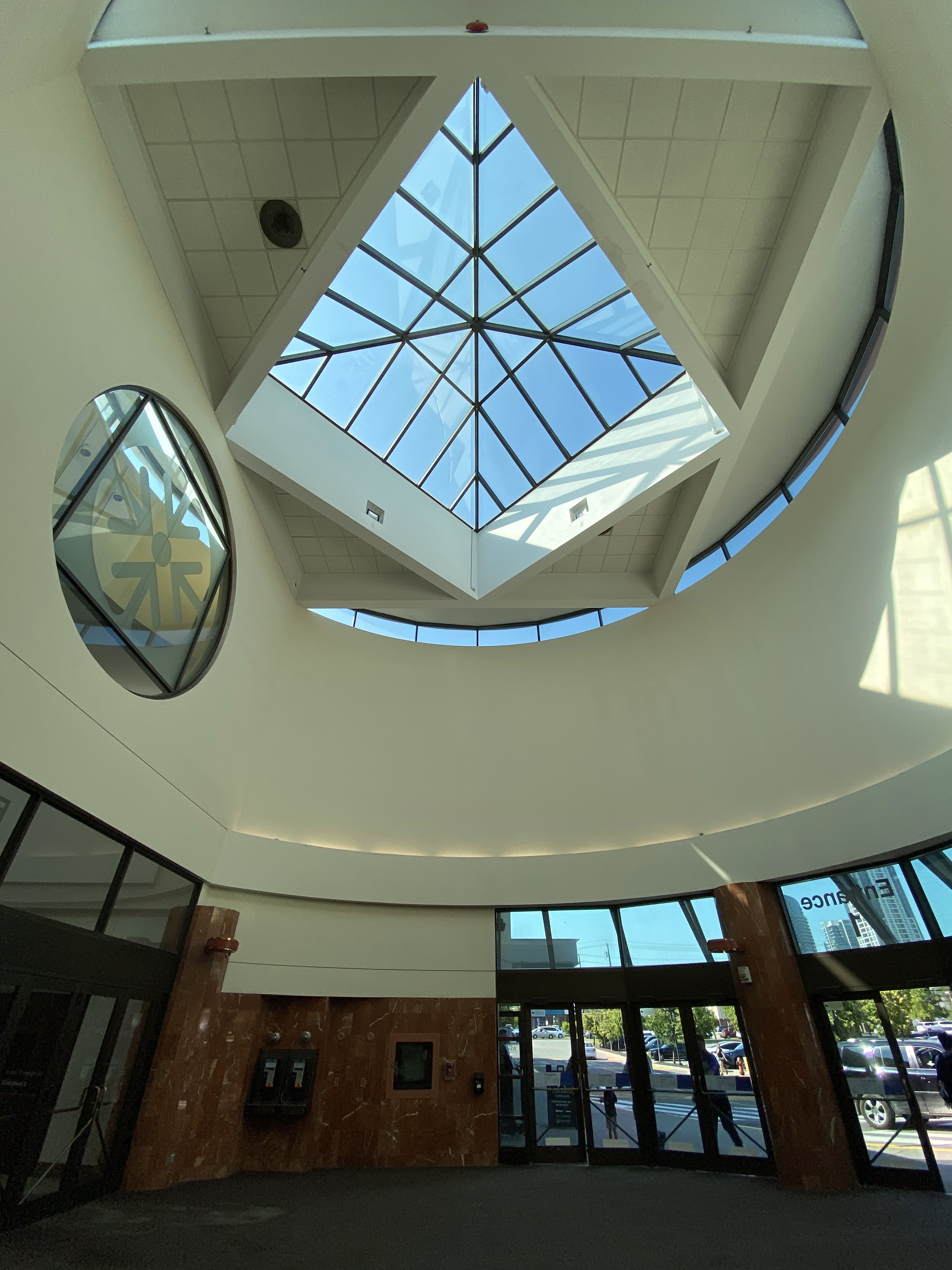
Entrance 1 void

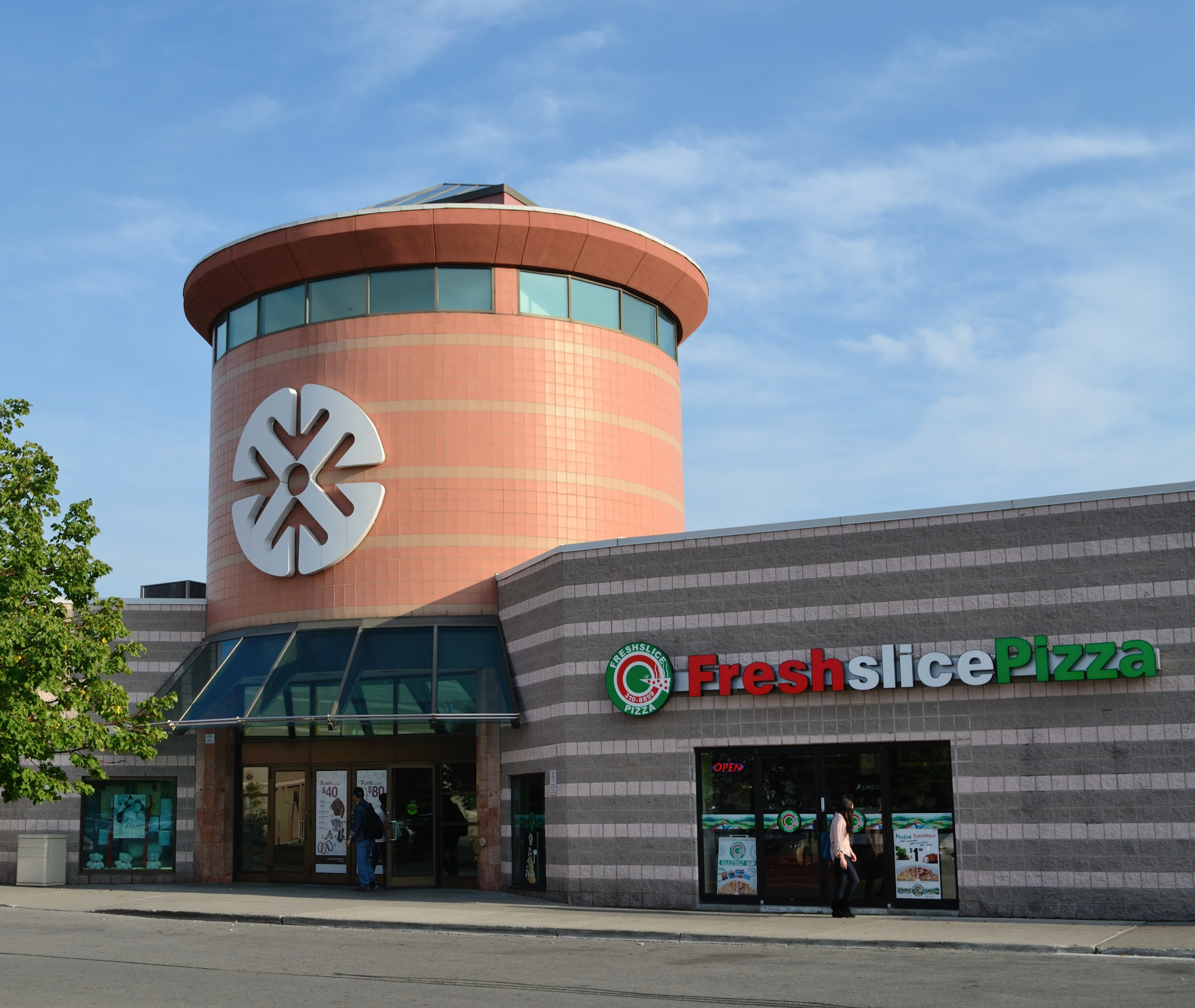
Closeup of facade

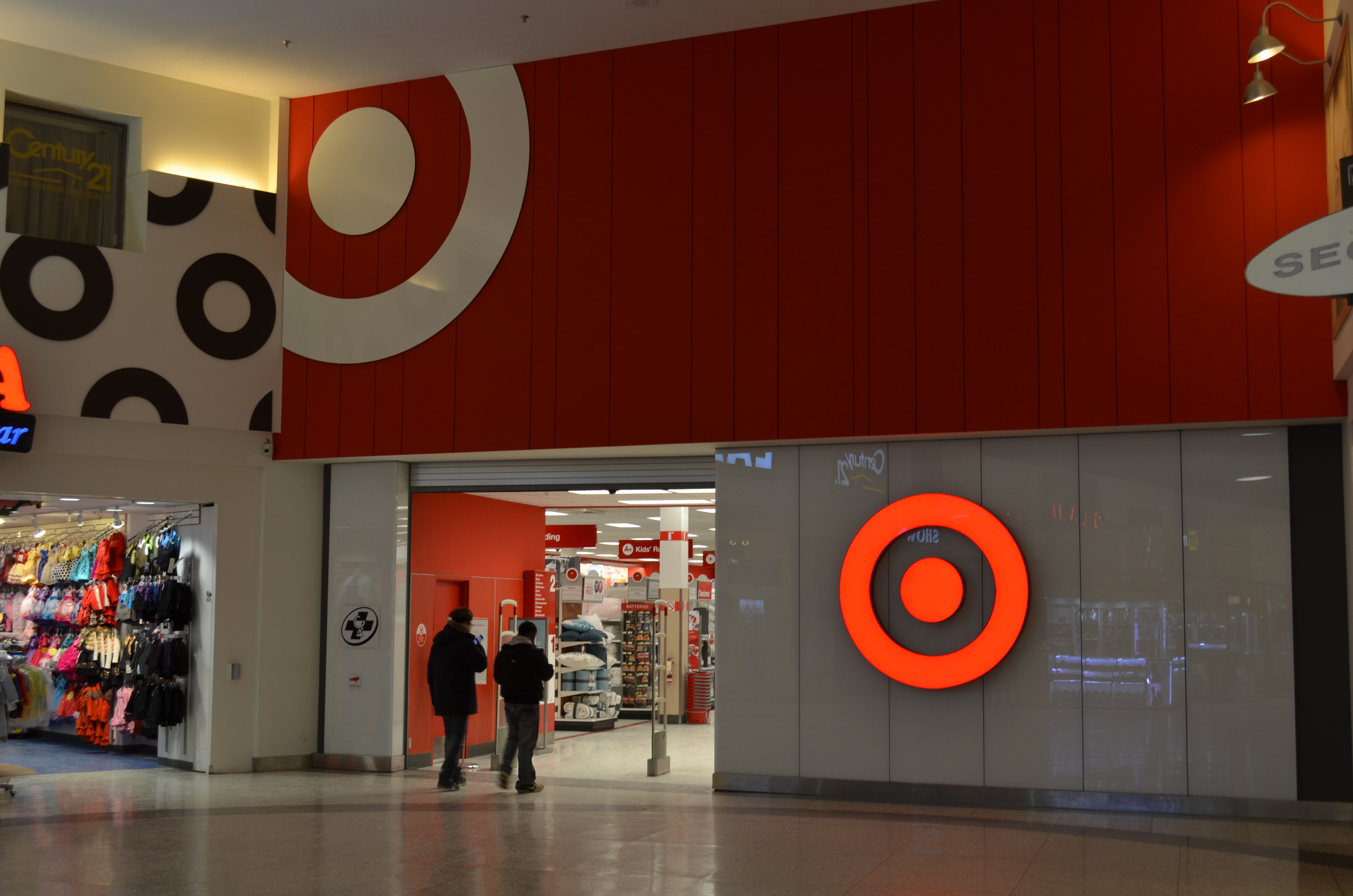
Target opened in 2013 and closed in 2015.

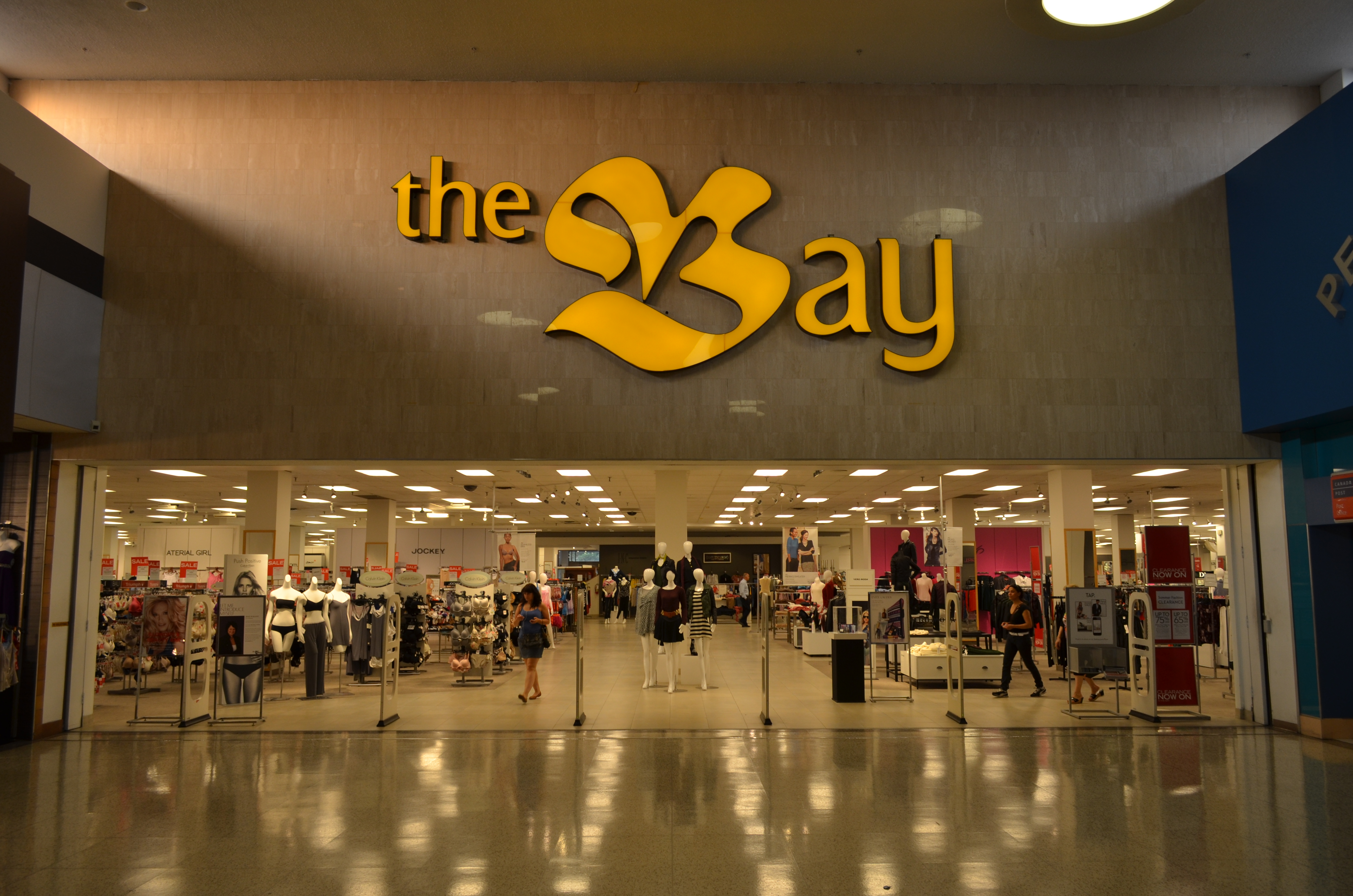
Hudson's Bay in 2013 with its former logo

== See also ==
- List of shopping malls in Canada
- List of shopping malls in Toronto
