= Douglas Bassett (media executive) =

Canadian media executive

Douglas Graeme Bassett
- Born: June 22, 1940 (age 85); Toronto, Ontario
- Occupation: media executive
- Parent: John W. H. Bassett
- Relatives: John F. Bassett (brother), Carling Bassett (niece), Isabel Bassett (stepmother)
- Awards: Order of Canada; Order of Ontario

Douglas Graeme Bassett, OC OOnt (born June 22, 1940) is a Canadian media executive.

Born in Toronto, Ontario, the son of John W. H. Bassett, he is the former president and chief executive officer of Baton Broadcasting Inc. and chairman of the Board of CTV Television Network Limited. He was educated at Upper Canada College.

In 1991, he was made an Officer of the Order of Canada in recognition for being "one of Canada's leading business figures". He was awarded the Order of Ontario in 1995 and is a Knight of the Order of St. John. In 2005, he was inducted into the Canadian Association of Broadcasters Hall of Fame.

He is married to Susan Juliet Temple and has three daughters; Deborah, Stephanie and Jennifer.
