= Stafford Smythe =

Canadian ice hockey executive (1921–1971)

- Born: Conn Stafford Smythe; March 15, 1921; Toronto, Ontario, Canada
- Died: October 13, 1971 (aged 50); Toronto, Ontario, Canada
- Education: University of Toronto
- Occupation: Ice hockey executive
- Relatives: Conn Smythe (father)

Conn Stafford Smythe (March 15, 1921 – October 13, 1971) was the son of Conn Smythe and president of Maple Leaf Gardens Ltd. and the Toronto Maple Leafs hockey team from 1961–1969 and from 1970 until his death.

== Early years ==
Born in Toronto, Smythe played hockey for Upper Canada College and Runnymede Collegiate Institute in the 1930s and then went to the University of Toronto where he graduated with an engineering degree. He played one season with the Varsity Blues men's ice hockey team. In the 1940–41 season, he briefly played with the Toronto Marlboros, managed by Harold Ballard, whom Smythe had known since he was a young boy.

Smythe enlisted in the Royal Canadian Navy during World War II. After the war, he became a partner in his father's gravel business. In the late 1940s, he was hired as coach of the Marlboros by Ballard, the team president. Smythe was later promoted to managing director.

== Managing the Maple Leafs ==
In March 1957, Smythe became chairman of a seven-person committee appointed by his father to run hockey operations for the Leafs. He had been a critic of assistant general manager Hap Day, who had run the Leafs' hockey operations from 1955 to 1957 while Conn Smythe retained the title of general manager. Stafford accused Day of mismanaging younger players, especially those coming up from the Marlboros, and of sticking with an outdated defensive style of hockey. Smythe's committee became known as the Silver Seven. Initially, all members were in their 30s or early 40s, but before the end of the year, 54-year-old Ballard was appointed to the committee to fill a vacancy.

The committee hired Howie Meeker as general manager, but fired him before the start of the season, leaving the Leafs without a general manager for the 1957–58 season. Smythe, as committee chairman, was effectively the team's general manager that year. In 1958, they hired Punch Imlach to run hockey operations while the committee focused on the business side.

Stafford frequently clashed with his father over the next few years. However, in November 1961, along with partners Ballard and John W. H. Bassett—both members of the Silver Seven—Stafford Smythe bought control of the Maple Leafs from his father, paying $2.3 million for 45,000 of his father's 50,000 shares. Conn later claimed that he believed he was only selling the team to his son, but it is not likely that Stafford would have been able to raise the money on his own. Stafford succeeded his father as president of Maple Leaf Gardens and governor of the Maple Leafs. Ballard, who had fronted most of the purchase money, became executive vice-president and alternate governor. Bassett became vice-chairman of the Gardens board of directors.

The Leafs, who had gone 11 years without winning a Stanley Cup, won the trophy four times in their first six seasons under the new owners. Profitability was increased through expanded seating capacity at Maple Leaf Gardens and the sale of advertising to sponsors throughout the building. Stafford Smythe name appears on the Stanley Cup 5 times - 1932 (as Mascot), 1962, 1963, 1964, 1967 (as President) all with Toronto. In 1932 Smythe became youngest person engraved on the Stanley Cup at age 11.

== Scandal and arrest ==
Following an RCMP raid at the Gardens in 1968, Smythe was charged with income tax evasion and accused, along with Ballard, of illegally taking money from Maple Leaf Gardens Ltd. to pay for renovations of their houses and other personal expenses.

Just before the charges were laid, Bassett, who had succeeded Conn Smythe as chairman of the board in 1962, argued to the board that Smythe and Ballard should be removed from their posts. Following an 8–7 vote of the board of directors on June 26, 1969; Smythe and Ballard were both fired, and Bassett was appointed president of the Gardens. The move came just a couple of months after Smythe had fired Imlach after an unimpressive season from the Leafs.

However, Bassett did not force Smythe and Ballard to sell their shares, and both men remained on the board. This proved to be a serious strategic blunder; Smythe was the largest single shareholder in Maple Leaf Gardens, and he and Ballard controlled almost half the company's stock between them. They were thus able to stage a proxy war and regain control of the board in 1970. Smythe was once again appointed president. Facing an untenable situation, Bassett sold his shares in the Gardens to Smythe and Ballard for $6 million in 1971. Ballard would be convicted of tax evasion, but Smythe died of a bleeding ulcer at age 50 just before his trial was scheduled to begin. Ballard took control of the Leafs in 1972, winning a battle with members of Smythe's family for ownership of Smythe's shares.

The Stafford Smythe Memorial Trophy, awarded annually to the MVP of the Memorial Cup tournament, is named in his honour.

Preceded by Conn Smythe and Hap Day	de facto General Manager of the Toronto Maple Leafs; 1957–58	Succeeded by Punch Imlach
Preceded by Conn Smythe	Principal owner, Toronto Maple Leafs; 1961–1971 (with Harold Ballard and John W. H. Bassett until 1970 and with Harold Ballard until 1972)	Succeeded by Harold Ballard
