= Bill Ballard =

Canadian businessman (1946–2014)

William Owen Sydney Ballard (November 10, 1946 – March 14, 2014) was a businessman and concert promoter. His father was Toronto Maple Leafs hockey mogul Harold Ballard.

The younger Ballard became a director and vice-president of Maple Leaf Gardens in 1972 when his father was sentenced to prison for fraud. Their relationship deteriorated after Harold Ballard's release from prison and return to Maple Leaf Gardens the following year though Bill Ballard remained on the MLG board until 1988 when his father removed him from the board and barred his concert promotion company from the Gardens.

Bill Ballard was a founder of Concert Productions International (familiarly, CPI), a major promoter of rock concerts and tours in North America. It was established in Toronto in 1973 as a subsidiary of WBC Productions Ltd by Michael Cohl, William (Bill) Ballard, and David Wolinsky.

He was a co-founder of Canada's Walk of Fame.

Ballard died of cancer in 2014 at the age of 67 and was survived by wife Renee and daughter Maryke.
