= John F. Bassett =

Canadian tennis player, businessman and film producer (1939-1986)

- Born: February 5, 1939; Ontario, Canada
- Died: May 14, 1986 (aged 47); Toronto, Ontario, Canada
- Occupations: Tennis player, businessman, film producer, squash player
- Children: 4, including Carling Bassett
- Parent: John W. H. Bassett
- Relatives: Doug Bassett (brother); Isabel Bassett (stepmother)

John Frederick Bassett (February 5, 1939 – May 14, 1986) was a Canadian tennis player, businessman, and film producer.

== Athletic career ==
Bassett won the Canadian Open Junior Doubles Championship in 1955 when he was 15 years old. He reached the second round of the 1959 U.S. National Championships in singles, appearing only in the main draw of the tournament. Bassett never played a Davis Cup match for Canada, though he was on the team in 1959. He was also a member of Canada's 1959 Pan American Games tennis team. He played tennis, squash, football, and hockey at the University of Western Ontario.

Bassett was also a successful squash player; he reached the semi-finals of the 1969 Canadian Open and was champion of Ontario from 1965 to 1967.

== Business career ==
In 1960, Bassett initially worked as a reporter for The Victoria Times. He later worked for the family-owned Toronto Telegram until it folded in 1971. Bassett also worked as a motion picture producer, serving as a president of Amulet Pictures, Ltd. He produced the films Paperback Hero, Spring Fever, and Face Off. Bassett and Tom Ficara owned Federal Broadcasting Company, a seminal American cable TV network. Bassett and Ficara produced the first live, national commercial cablecast (of Bassett's WHA Birmingham Bulls team) in 1976. His other business interests included ownership of a computer software company and a real estate firm based in Sarasota, Florida.

== Sports franchise ownership ==
In 1973, Bassett and twenty-six others purchased the Ottawa Nationals of the World Hockey Association for $1.8 million after which the team was moved to Toronto, where it was renamed the Toronto Toros. After three seasons in Toronto, Bassett moved the Toros to Birmingham, Alabama, in 1976, renaming them the Birmingham Bulls.

The Bulls operated in Birmingham until 1979, when four of the six surviving WHA clubs (Edmonton Oilers, New England Whalers, Quebec Nordiques, and Winnipeg Jets) were absorbed into the National Hockey League. The Bulls and the Cincinnati Stingers were not included in the merger/expansion agreement.

In 1974 John F. Bassett started the World Football League's Toronto Northmen. The controversy this stirred in Canada forced him to move the team to Memphis, Tennessee, and rename it the Memphis Southmen. He signed three stars from the National Football League's Miami Dolphins — Larry Csonka, Jim Kiick, and Paul Warfield — and they joined the WFL in 1974. In addition to owning both the Southmen and the Toros/Bulls, Bassett also owned the USFL's Tampa Bay Bandits and the Toronto-Buffalo Royals of World Team Tennis.

Bassett was initially reluctant to get into the USFL. However, he agreed to sign on when he saw that he would be one of the upstart league's poorest owners. He had been by far the richest owner in the WFL, and concluded that if he wasn't as wealthy as the other owners, the USFL was on more solid ground than the WFL had been. From 1984, Bassett sparred with New Jersey Generals owner Donald Trump over the league's schedule. Trump favored moving the USFL to a fall schedule, while Bassett held fast to the USFL's original concept as a spring league. When a majority of the USFL's team owners voted to go head-to-head with the NFL in the fall, Bassett announced he was pulling the Bandits from the USFL and starting another spring league for competition, at one point—possibly driven by cancer-induced delirium—suggesting his league's teams would play multiple sports. CFL Commissioner Douglas Mitchell denied Bassett's team entry into the league due to its U.S. location, although the CFL later expanded into the United States (1993–95). He sold his stake in the Bandits in 1985.

A subsequent lawsuit between the USFL and NFL led to the demise of the former. While the USFL defeated the NFL in the United States District Court for the Southern District of New York in an antitrust lawsuit under U.S. federal law, the league was awarded only $3 in compensatory damages.

== Honours ==
In 2010, Bassett was elected as an inaugural inductee into the World Hockey Association Hall of Fame in the builders category.

== Personal life ==
Bassett was the son of Canadian Media mogul John W.H. Bassett and attended Upper Canada College in Toronto and the University of Western Ontario.

He and his wife Susan had four children, including former women's professional tennis player Carling Bassett. They lived in Toronto and Sarasota.

Bassett died on May 14, 1986, in Toronto General Hospital after a long illness, suffering from two brain tumors.
