= Knob Hill Farms =

Former Canadian supermarket chain

- Industry: Supermarket retail
- Founded: 1953
- Founder: Steve Stavro
- Defunct: 2001
- Area served: Greater Toronto Area and Cambridge, Ontario
- Owner: Steve Stavro

Knob Hill Farms was a supermarket chain in the Greater Toronto Area, Ontario, Canada that operated from 1953 to 2001 and was owned by businessman Steve Stavro. It began as a single produce store in the east end of Toronto in 1953 before growing into one of Canada's largest grocery chains, all with only 10 locations in and around Toronto. Knob Hill Farms was an early innovator in the field of "big box grocers" in the early 1960s, culminating in Knob Hill Farm's Cambridge location being the largest grocery store in the world at the time of its opening in 1991.

== Knob Hill Farms origin ==
Knob Hill Farms began as a small east Toronto fruit stand in 1951, operated by Steve Stavro, his brother Chris and their father. Stavro said he took the name from a box of produce from California. At the time, Stavro had dropped out of high school to work in retail with his father. By 1954, Steve was running his own traditional grocery store at 425–427 Danforth Avenue. By the late 1950s, Stavro was operating nine grocery stores and outdoor markets in Toronto.

== Food terminals ==
In 1963, Stavro changed direction and opened his first "food terminal"—a forerunner of the big-box store with 60,000 square feet (6,000 square-metres) of space just north of Toronto at Woodbine Avenue and Highway 7 in Markham. At the time of its opening, the Markham location was the biggest grocery store in Canada.

In 1971, Stavro opened a second terminal in Pickering, Ontario – immediately to the east of Toronto. In 1975, the third terminal was opened, the first in Toronto. The terminal was located at Lansdowne Avenue and Dundas Street West, on a site previously occupied by a National Cash Register plant. A second Toronto terminal opened in 1977, at Cherry Street and the Gardiner Expressway. The fifth store, billed as the largest food store in North America, opened November 1, 1978, at Dixie Road and the Queen Elizabeth Way in Mississauga – immediately to the west of Toronto.

On June 29, 1983, Knob Hill Farms opened a location in Oshawa, Ontario in the former Ontario Malleable Iron Company Limited's factory. The building had been used as an iron foundry since 1898, although the company had operated at that site since 1872. The 226,000 square foot (21,000 square metre) building had railway spurs for both Canadian Pacific and Canadian National Railway lines running right to the store. A pharmacy, bakery, dentist's office, video rental store, wine store, and a card shop were among the other businesses initially located within the terminal.

In 1985, the seventh Knob Hill Farms terminal, this one at Weston Road and Highway 401 in the Weston community of Toronto, opened. The site was previously an industrial building dating back to the 1930s and was used for the assembly of aeroplanes (de Havilland Mosquitos) by Massey Harris during World War II. The store featured John Richmond's 1,300 ft (400 m) mural depicting the history of food from Prometheus to Marc Garneau.

In 1984 Knob Hill Farms purchased 1900 Eglinton Ave. East from General Electric on the closing of its factory. The plan was to construct a new food terminal catering to the Scarborough, Ontario community. This plan, however, was opposed by some members of the local community and led by the area alderman, a real estate broker, who felt the terminal would be "too disruptive to the existing fabric of development". In 1987 the application for development was formally turned down. The denial came as somewhat of a surprise, forcing Knob Hill Farms to pivot its strategy for the location, turning it into a wholesale retailer on the north side of the building and the south side of the building became Knob Hill Farms’ head office.

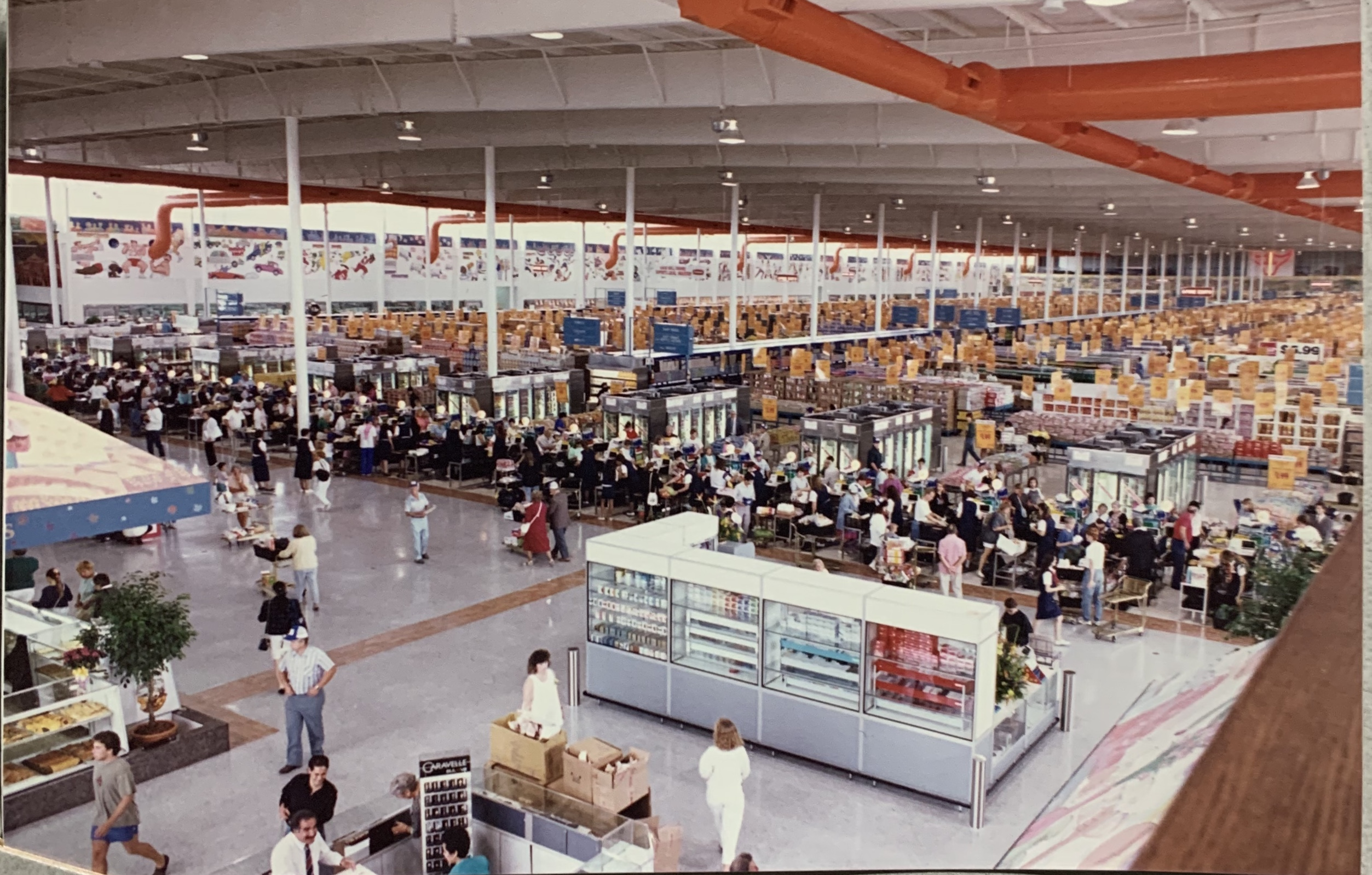
Interior of the Knob Hill Farms location in Cambridge, Ontario.

On August 21, 1991, Knob Hill Farms opened a terminal in Cambridge, Ontario, the first outside the Greater Toronto Area. The terminal measured 340,000 square feet (31,500 square metres), making it the largest food retail store in the world. It was estimated that the terminal saw over 20,000 customers on opening day, with hour long lines and traffic jams surrounding the store. The store featured 5,250 ft (1,600 m) of refrigeration units, a 500 ft (150 m) meat counter and 1,500 parking spaces.

The final Knob Hill terminal, the Riverdale terminal, opened in 1992. The terminal was located at the Carlaw and Gerrard intersection in Toronto.

A defining feature of Knob Hill Farms stores was the use of cardboard and plastic baskets at checkout instead of plastic bags. Unlike their competitors, there were no scanners at the cash registers.

== Closure ==
In August 2000, Stavro announced that all stores would close. At the time, the company had about 800 employees at 10 locations. Knob Hill Farms had lost market share to new competitors. The final store; the Weston site, closed in February 2001.

== See also ==
- List of Canadian supermarkets
- Knob Hill Stable
