= Max Kaminsky (ice hockey) =

Canadian ice hockey player and coach

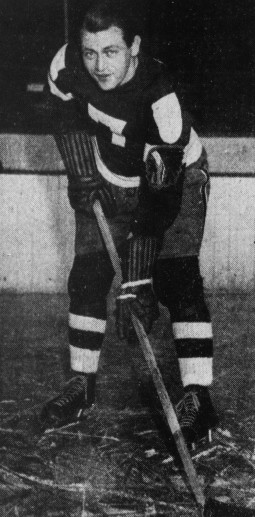
- Kaminsky, c. 1939
- Born: April 19, 1912 Niagara Falls, Ontario, Canada
- Died: May 5, 1961 (aged 49) New York City, New York, U.S.
- Height: 5 ft 11 in (180 cm)
- Weight: 170 lb (77 kg; 12 st 2 lb)
- Position: Centre
- Shot: Left
- Played for: Ottawa Senators; St. Louis Eagles; Boston Bruins; Montreal Maroons
- Playing career: 1932–1945

Max Kaminsky (April 19, 1912 – May 5, 1961) was a Canadian professional ice hockey player and coach. He played four seasons in the National Hockey League, followed by nine seasons in the American Hockey League where he won two Calder Cup championships. He later coached the Pittsburgh Hornets and Philadelphia Rockets, then led the St. Catharines Teepees to the 1960 Memorial Cup championship. The Max Kaminsky Trophy was established by the Ontario Hockey Association in his honour in 1961, and he was posthumously inducted into the Niagara Falls Sports Wall of Fame in 1992.

== Early life ==
Max Kaminsky was born April 19, 1912, in Niagara Falls, Ontario, to parents Harry Kaminsky and Toby Tabacznokov. The family name was spelled Kamensky before his parents immigrated to Canada from Russia. Kaminsky's father worked as a tailor in Canada. Both of his parents had Russian-Jewish heritage.

Kaminsky played minor ice hockey in Niagara Falls. He later played on Niagara Falls Cataracts teams which won an Ontario Hockey Association junior championship in the 1930–31 season, and a senior championship in the 1932–33 season. He also played baseball in Niagara Falls, and was scouted by several Major League Baseball teams.

== Playing career ==
Kaminsky played the centre position, and was listed as 5 feet 11 inches (1.80 m) and 170 pounds (77 kg). In 1933, he was one of four players from the Cataracts to be signed by the Ottawa Senators in the National Hockey League (NHL). He an assist in his first NHL game. He subsequently played in the NHL for the St. Louis Eagles, Boston Bruins, and Montreal Maroons.

Kaminsky later played in the American Hockey League (AHL). During the 1939–40 AHL season, he scored 11 goals and 29 assists, and was named a second team AHL all-star. He later won two Calder Cup championships in the American Hockey League playing for the Buffalo Bisons. He was later the player-coach of the Pittsburgh Hornets. In Pittsburgh, he received the Dapper Dan Award as the city's outstanding sports person.

== Coaching career ==
Kaminsky coached the Philadelphia Rockets for three seasons, then coached the Niagara Falls Cataracts in the senior ice hockey B-division of the Ontario Hockey Association for the 1955–56 season. After three seasons away from hockey, he coached the St. Catharines Teepees during the 1959–60 season. During the 1960 playoffs for the George Richardson Memorial Trophy versus the Montreal Junior Canadiens, he suffered from pleurisy and was relieved on the bench on two occasions. He returned and led the Teepees to the 1960 Memorial Cup championship versus the Edmonton Oil Kings.

== Personal life ==
Kaminsky played amateur baseball during the summer, and coached youth teams in the Niagara Falls Baseball Association leagues. He played with Niagara Falls Brights seniors from 1938 to 1941, won four Niagara District championships, and Ontario Baseball Association titles in 1940 and 1941. He was also a player coach of the 1942 Niagara Falls senior team, and later played and coached in Welland, Ontario.

Kaminsky was married and had three children. He lived the final 12 years of his life in Niagara Falls, New York, where he operated a restaurant. He resigned from coaching less than one month after winning the Memorial Cup, due to health issues. He died from cancer on May 5, 1961, at Mount Sinai Hospital in New York City.

== Honours and legacy ==
The Max Kaminsky Trophy was established by the Ontario Hockey Association in his honour in 1961, awarded to the most gentlemanly player in the junior-A series. Since 1969, the trophy was awarded to the most outstanding defenceman in the Ontario Hockey League.

Kaminsky was posthumously inducted into the Niagara Falls Sports Wall of Fame in 1992.

== Career statistics ==
=== Regular season and playoffs ===
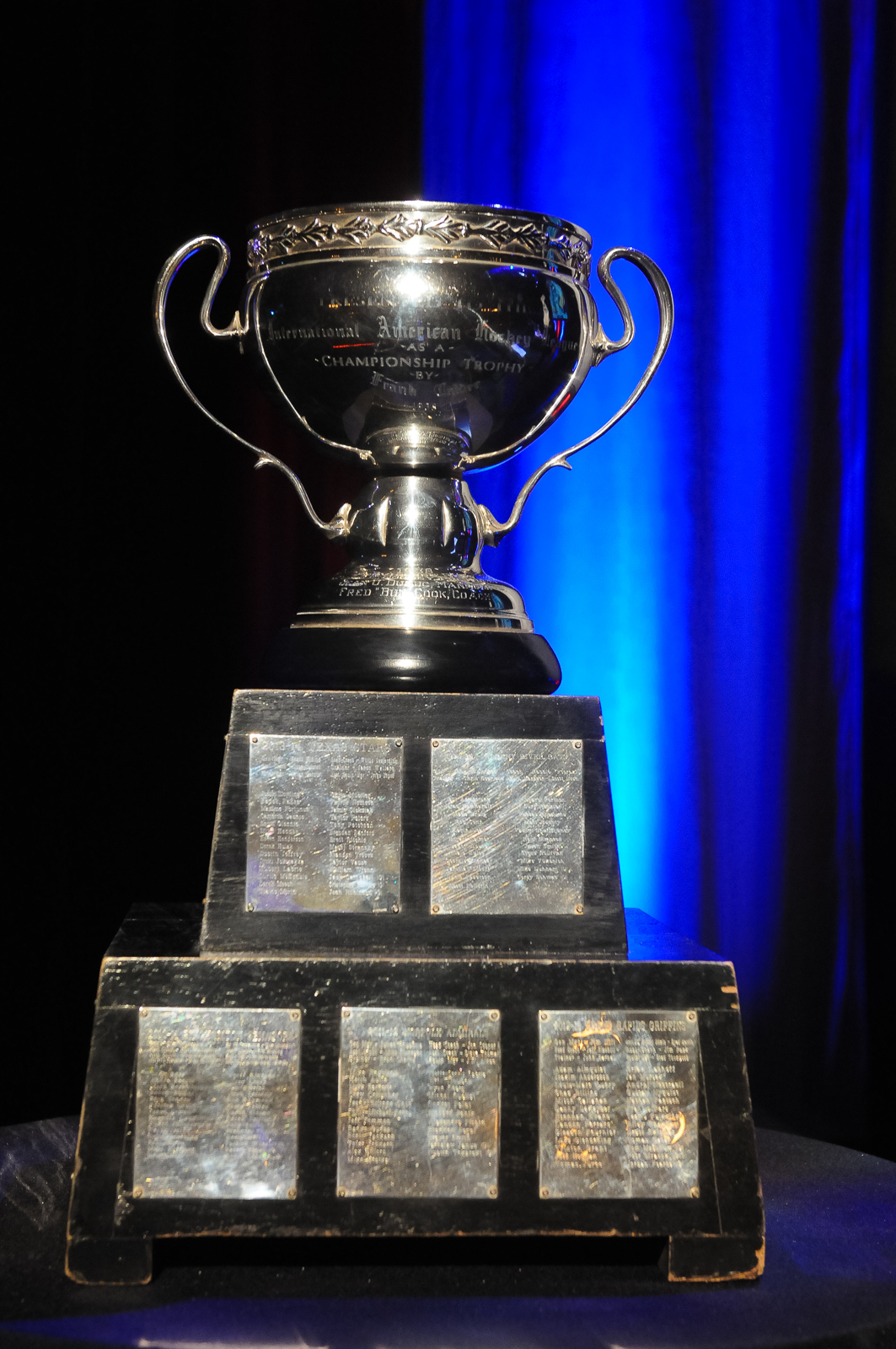
The Calder Cup trophy

			Regular season					Playoffs
Season	Team	League	GP	G	A	Pts	PIM	GP	G	A	Pts	PIM
1929–30	Niagara Falls Cataracts	OHA Jr	6	9	4	13	2	2	5	1	6	0
1929–30	Niagara Falls Cataracts	Mem-Cup	—	—	—	—	—	6	7	8	15	2
1930–31	Niagara Falls Cataracts	OHA Jr	7	14	15	29	0	2	3	0	3	4
1930–31	Niagara Falls Brights	On-Sr. B	1	1	1	2	0	—	—	—	—	—
1931–32	Niagara Falls Cataracts	OHA Sr	20	12	3	15	18	2	0	0	0	2
1932–33	Niagara Falls Cataracts	OHA Sr	21	11	7	18	36	5	2	1	3	13
1932–33	Niagara Falls Cataracts	Al-Cup	—	—	—	—	—	6	3	1	4	2
1933–34	Niagara Falls Cataracts	OHA Sr	6	5	3	8	8	—	—	—	—	—
1933–34	Ottawa Senators	NHL	38	9	17	26	14	—	—	—	—	—
1934–35	St. Louis Eagles	NHL	12	0	0	0	0	—	—	—	—	—
1934–35	Boston Bruins	NHL	38	12	15	27	4	4	0	0	0	0
1935–36	Boston Bruins	NHL	36	1	2	3	20	—	—	—	—	—
1936–37	Montreal Maroons	NHL	6	0	0	0	0	—	—	—	—	—
1936–37	Providence Reds	IAHL	2	0	0	0	0	—	—	—	—	—
1936–37	New Haven Eagles	IAHL	20	3	5	8	6	—	—	—	—	—
1937–38	New Haven Eagles	IAHL	15	2	4	6	4	—	—	—	—	—
1937–38	Springfield Indians	IAHL	31	3	4	7	14	—	—	—	—	—
1938–39	Springfield Indians	IAHL	46	7	14	21	8	3	0	1	1	2
1939–40	Springfield Indians	IAHL	53	11	29	40	20	3	0	2	2	0
1940–41	Springfield Indians	AHL	40	13	9	22	9	3	2	0	2	0
1941–42	Springfield Indians	AHL	53	18	23	41	9	5	0	2	2	0
1942–43	Buffalo Bisons	AHL	42	10	36	46	6	9	2	12	14	4
1943–44	Buffalo Bisons	AHL	42	7	29	36	17	9	4	2	6	2
1944–45	Pittsburgh Hornets	AHL	54	5	28	33	17	—	—	—	—	—
IAHL/AHL totals			398	79	181	260	110	32	8	19	27	8
NHL totals			130	22	34	56	38	4	0	0	0	0
