= Bob McCulley =

Canadian ice hockey player (1912–1993)

- Born: February 8, 1912 Stratford, Ontario, Canada
- Died: August 15, 1993 (aged 81)
- Height: 6 ft 2 in (188 cm)
- Weight: 210 lb (95 kg; 15 st 0 lb)
- Position: Right wing/Defence
- Shot: Right
- Played for: Montreal Canadiens
- Playing career: 1932–1942

Robert Keith McCully (February 8, 1912 – August 15, 1993) was a Canadian professional ice hockey right winger who played in one game in the National Hockey League for the Montreal Canadiens during the 1934–35 season, on November 17, 1934 against the Detroit Red Wings. The rest of his career, which lasted from 1932 to 1942, was spent in the minor leagues.

== Career statistics ==
=== Regular season and playoffs ===
			Regular season					Playoffs
Season	Team	League	GP	G	A	Pts	PIM	GP	G	A	Pts	PIM
1929–30	Stratford Midgets	OHA	6	6	1	7	12	2	1	0	1	8
1930–31	Stratford Midgets	OHA	5	3	1	4	4	2	3	0	3	4
1930–31	Stratford Midgets	M-Cup	—	—	—	—	—	2	3	0	3	4
1931–32	Oshawa Generals	OHA	—	—	—	—	—	—	—	—	—	—
1932–33	Providence Reds	Can-Am	41	7	2	9	38	2	0	0	0	0
1933–34	Providence Reds	Can-Am	2	0	0	0	0	—	—	—	—	—
1933–34	New Haven Eagles	Can-Am	38	13	3	16	24	—	—	—	—	—
1934–35	Montreal Canadiens	NHL	1	0	0	0	0	—	—	—	—	—
1934–35	New Haven Eagles	Can-Am	7	1	2	3	11	—	—	—	—	—
1934–35	Quebec Castors	Can-Am	8	1	2	3	4	—	—	—	—	—
1934–35	Boston Tigers	Can-Am	19	6	5	11	4	3	0	0	0	2
1935–36	Boston Cubs	Can-Am	42	14	7	21	20	—	—	—	—	—
1935–36	New Haven Eagles	Can-Am	5	4	1	5	2	—	—	—	—	—
1936–37	Springfield Indians	IAHL	33	7	7	14	10	5	1	2	3	2
1936–37	New Haven Eagles	IAHL	4	0	0	0	4	—	—	—	—	—
1936–37	Providence Reds	IAHL	4	1	2	3	6	—	—	—	—	—
1937–38	Springfield Indians	IAHL	8	0	0	0	4	—	—	—	—	—
1937–38	New Haven Eagles	IAHL	39	4	2	6	19	2	0	1	1	2
1938–39	New Haven Eagles	IAHL	53	13	12	25	10	—	—	—	—	—
1939–40	New Haven Eagles	IAHL	51	8	8	16	32	3	0	1	1	6
1940–41	Philadelphia Ramblers	AHL	54	2	4	6	52	—	—	—	—	—
1941–42	Minneapolis Millers	AHA	17	2	2	4	10	—	—	—	—	—
1941–42	Providence Reds	AHL	20	1	3	4	9	—	—	—	—	—
IAHL/AHL totals			266	36	38	74	146	10	1	4	5	10
NHL totals			1	0	0	0	0	—	—	—	—	—

== See also ==
- List of players who played only one game in the NHL
