= Jackie Keating =

Canadian ice hockey player

- Born: February 12, 1908; Saint John, New Brunswick, Canada
- Died: November 14, 1984 (aged 76)
- Height: 5 ft 7 in (170 cm)
- Weight: 145 lb (66 kg; 10 st 5 lb)
- Position: Left wing
- Shot: Left
- Played for: New York Americans
- Playing career: 1930–1947

John Richard Keating (February 12, 1908 — November 14, 1984) was a Canadian professional ice hockey player who played 35 games in the National Hockey League with the New York Americans between the 1931–32 and 1932–33 seasons. The rest of his career, which lasted from 1930 to 1947, was spent in the minor leagues. Keating was born in Saint John, New Brunswick.

== Career statistics ==
=== Regular season and playoffs ===
| | | | Regular season | | | | | Playoffs |
| Season | Team | League | GP | G | A | Pts | PIM | GP | G | A | Pts | PIM |
|---|---|---|---|---|---|---|---|---|---|---|---|---|
| 1925–26 | Chatham Ironmen | NNBHL | 12 | 2 | 1 | 3 | 0 | 2 | 0 | 0 | 0 | 0 |
| 1926–27 | Saint John Fusiliers | SNBHL | 12 | 10 | 3 | 13 | 26 | 2 | 1 | 0 | 1 | 2 |
| 1927–28 | Saint John Fusiliers | SNBHL | 12 | 15 | 8 | 23 | 42 | 2 | 1 | 0 | 1 | 8 |
| 1927–28 | Saint John Fusiliers | Al-Cup | — | — | — | — | — | 7 | 8 | 5 | 13 | 12 |
| 1928–29 | Saint John Fusiliers | SNBHL | 12 | 12 | 9 | 21 | 16 | 2 | 1 | 0 | 1 | 4 |
| 1929–30 | Saint John Beavers | SNBHL | 11 | 9 | 6 | 15 | 35 | 2 | 0 | 0 | 0 | 4 |
| 1929–30 | Saint John Beavers | Al-Cup | — | — | — | — | — | 4 | 2 | 0 | 2 | 4 |
| 1930–31 | New Haven Eagles | Can-Am | 39 | 9 | 2 | 11 | 49 | — | — | — | — | — |
| 1931–32 | New York Americans | NHL | 22 | 5 | 3 | 8 | 6 | — | — | — | — | — |
| 1931–32 | New Haven Eagles | Can-Am | 21 | 4 | 4 | 8 | 26 | — | — | — | — | — |
| 1932–33 | New York Americans | NHL | 13 | 0 | 2 | 2 | 11 | — | — | — | — | — |
| 1932–33 | New Haven Eagles | Can-Am | 39 | 12 | 8 | 20 | 71 | — | — | — | — | — |
| 1933–34 | Buffalo Bisons | IHL | 43 | 8 | 4 | 12 | 21 | 6 | 0 | 0 | 0 | 2 |
| 1934–35 | Providence Reds | Can-Am | 46 | 16 | 19 | 35 | 27 | 6 | 2 | 2 | 4 | 2 |
| 1935–36 | Providence Reds | Can-Am | 47 | 10 | 12 | 22 | 35 | 7 | 2 | 3 | 5 | 4 |
| 1936–37 | Providence Reds | IAHL | 51 | 12 | 31 | 43 | 22 | 3 | 1 | 2 | 3 | 2 |
| 1937–38 | Providence Reds | IAHL | 45 | 15 | 13 | 28 | 20 | 7 | 2 | 3 | 5 | 0 |
| 1938–39 | Providence Reds | IAHL | 51 | 5 | 18 | 23 | 16 | 5 | 0 | 1 | 1 | 0 |
| 1939–40 | Syracuse Stars | IAHL | 40 | 11 | 17 | 28 | 14 | — | — | — | — | — |
| 1940–41 | Buffalo Bisons | AHL | 3 | 0 | 0 | 0 | 0 | — | — | — | — | — |
| 1940–41 | St. Paul Saints | AHA | 34 | 5 | 3 | 8 | 6 | 4 | 0 | 1 | 1 | 6 |
| 1941–42 | Saint John Beavers | Exhib | 7 | 9 | 5 | 14 | 0 | — | — | — | — | — |
| 1941–42 | Saint John Garrison | Al-Cup | — | — | — | — | — | 2 | 2 | 1 | 3 | 2 |
| 1942–43 | Saint John Garrison | Exhib | 3 | 1 | 3 | 4 | 2 | — | — | — | — | — |
| 1942–43 | Saint John Garrison | Al-Cup | — | — | — | — | — | 7 | 3 | 3 | 6 | 6 |
| 1943–44 | Saint John Garrison | Exhib | 11 | 6 | 11 | 17 | 2 | — | — | — | — | — |
| 1943–44 | Saint John Beavers | Al-Cup | — | — | — | — | — | 5 | 9 | 4 | 13 | 0 |
| 1945–46 | Saint John Beavers | Exhib | 1 | 1 | 1 | 2 | 0 | — | — | — | — | — |
| 1946–47 | Saint John Beavers | MSHL | — | — | — | — | — | — | — | — | — | — |
| Can-Am totals | | | 192 | 51 | 45 | 96 | 208 | 13 | 4 | 5 | 9 | 6 |
| IAHL/AHL totals | | | 190 | 43 | 79 | 122 | 72 | 15 | 3 | 6 | 9 | 2 |
| NHL totals | | | 35 | 5 | 5 | 10 | 17 | — | — | — | — | — |
