= Norman Mann =

English ice hockey player

- Born: March 3, 1914 Bradford, England, U.K.
- Died: February 9, 1994 (aged 79)
- Height: 5 ft 10 in (178 cm)
- Weight: 155 lb (70 kg; 11 st 1 lb)
- Position: Right Wing
- Shot: Right
- Played for: Toronto Maple Leafs
- Playing career: 1933–1949

Norman Thomas Mann (March 3, 1914 – February 9, 1994) was Canadian professional ice hockey player who played 31 games in the National Hockey League with the Toronto Maple Leafs between 1936 and 1941. The rest of his career, which lasted from 1933 to 1949, was mainly spent in the minor American Hockey League. Mann was born in Bradford, England, but grew up in Newmarket, Ontario.

== Career statistics ==
=== Regular season and playoffs ===
			Regular season					Playoffs
Season	Team	League	GP	G	A	Pts	PIM	GP	G	A	Pts	PIM
1931–32	Newmarket Redmen	OHA	7	1	1	2	12	—	—	—	—	—
1931–32	Newmarket Redmen	M-Cup	—	—	—	—	—	5	1	2	3	2
1932–33	Newmarket Redmen	OHA	17	11	8	19	—	—	—	—	—	—
1932–33	Newmarket Redmen	M-Cup	—	—	—	—	—	19	6	7	13	14
1933–34	Toronto Marlboros	OHA Sr	24	16	9	25	25	2	0	1	1	2
1933–34	Toronto British Consols	TMHL	11	8	4	12	14	5	1	1	2	16
1934–35	Toronto British Consols	TIHL	15	6	12	18	20	4	2	2	4	4
1934–35	Toronto All-Stars	TIHL	6	2	4	6	10	4	2	1	3	0
1935–36	Syracuse Stars	IHL	48	8	23	31	60	3	0	0	0	2
1935–36	Toronto Maple Leafs	NHL	—	—	—	—	—	1	0	0	0	0
1936–37	Syracuse Stars	IAHL	48	17	24	41	47	9	3	5	8	11
1937–38	Philadelphia Ramblers	IAHL	26	4	9	13	8	1	0	0	0	0
1938–39	Philadelphia Ramblers	IAHL	3	2	4	6	2	—	—	—	—	—
1938–39	Toronto Maple Leafs	NHL	16	0	0	0	2	—	—	—	—	—
1938–39	Syracuse Stars	IAHL	41	9	16	25	39	3	1	0	1	0
1939–40	Providence Reds	IAHL	36	11	16	27	25	8	3	5	8	6
1940–41	Toronto Maple Leafs	NHL	15	0	3	3	2	1	0	0	0	0
1940–41	Providence Reds	AHL	28	8	8	16	8	4	2	0	2	6
1941–42	Pittsburgh Hornets	AHL	41	16	36	52	11	—	—	—	—	—
1942–43	Pittsburgh Hornets	AHL	54	31	45	76	83	2	0	1	1	0
1942–43	Cleveland Barons	AHL	1	0	0	0	0	—	—	—	—	—
1943–44	Toronto Navy	OHA Sr	23	10	29	39	10	—	—	—	—	—
1944–45	Toronto Navy	TNDHL	12	8	10	18	21	6	2	1	3	2
1945–46	Toronto Staffords	TIHL	13	4	11	15	10	13	2	3	5	4
1948–49	Powassan Hawks	NBDHL	24	11	34	45	28	—	—	—	—	—
IAHL/AHL totals			305	103	164	267	240	31	9	11	20	25
NHL totals			31	0	3	3	4	2	0	0	0	0

== See also ==
- List of National Hockey League players from the United Kingdom
