= Sammy McManus =

Irish ice hockey player (1911–1976)

- Born: October 22, 1911 Belfast, Ireland, United Kingdom
- Died: July 1, 1976 (aged 64)
- Height: 5 ft 9 in (175 cm)
- Weight: 160 lb (73 kg; 11 st 6 lb)
- Position: Left wing
- Shot: Left
- Played for: Montreal Maroons; Boston Bruins
- Playing career: 1934–1947

Andrew Samuel McManus (October 22, 1911 – July 1, 1976) was a Canadian former professional ice hockey player who played 26 games in the National Hockey League with the Montreal Maroons and the Boston Bruins between 1934 and 1936. The rest of his career, which lasted from 1934 to 1947, was spent in various minor and senior leagues.

== Career ==
McManus was born in Belfast, Ireland, United Kingdom and raised in Toronto, Ontario. His professional career started in 1934, when after winning the 1934 Allan Cup with the amateur Moncton Hawks, he was invited to join the Montreal Maroons. He was then sent to the Windsor Bulldogs of the International Hockey League and expected to stay, but was later reclaimed by the Maroons. This move, along with the sale of Harold Starr to the New York Rangers, led the Bulldogs to dissolve their affiliation with the Maroons that started in 1929. In 1935, McManus helped the Maroons win the Stanley Cup.

After winning the Stanley Cup, the Maroons sold McManus to the New York Rangers who sent him to the Philadelphia Ramblers of the Canadian–American Hockey League (CAHL). Two days after the transfer, the Ramblers played against the Maroons and upset them 3-1, thanks to McManus scoring two goals against his former team. At the end of the season in 1936, he was named to the CAHL's all-star team.

== Career statistics ==
=== Regular season and playoffs ===
			Regular season					Playoffs
Season	Team	League	GP	G	A	Pts	PIM	GP	G	A	Pts	PIM
1928–29	Toronto Canoe Club	OHA	5	0	0	0	—	3	0	0	0	—
1929–30	Toronto Canoe Club	OHA	9	2	3	5	8	—	—	—	—	—
1929–30	Toronto Willys-Overland	TMHL	13	5	7	12	10	—	—	—	—	—
1930–31	New Glasgow Tigers	ENSSHL	24	7	10	17	28	2	0	0	0	0
1931–32	Fredericton Capitals	NBSHL	24	11	10	21	18	2	0	0	0	0
1932–33	Moncton Hawks	MSHL	25	3	5	8	43	5	1	2	3	4
1932–33	Moncton Hawks	Al-Cup	—	—	—	—	—	8	1	2	3	4
1933–34	Moncton Hawks	MSHL	38	25	23	48	47	3	0	0	0	0
1933–34	Moncton Hawks	Al-Cup	—	—	—	—	—	12	8	9	17	12
1934–35	Montreal Maroons	NHL	25	0	1	1	8	1	0	0	0	0
1934–35	Windsor Bulldogs	IHL	10	2	4	6	6	—	—	—	—	—
1934–35	New Haven Eagles	Can-Am	8	6	1	7	7	—	—	—	—	—
1935–36	Philadelphia Ramblers	Can-Am	43	19	21	40	22	4	0	2	2	2
1936–37	Boston Bruins	NHL	1	0	0	0	0	—	—	—	—	—
1936–37	Providence Reds	IAHL	34	12	9	21	6	3	0	0	0	2
1937–38	Providence Reds	IAHL	45	8	19	27	18	7	3	1	4	2
1938–39	Hershey Bears	IAHL	36	12	19	31	10	5	1	2	3	2
1939–40	Pittsburgh Hornets	IAHL	46	4	20	24	10	9	2	5	7	4
1939–40	New Haven Eagles	IAHL	6	1	1	2	2	—	—	—	—	—
1940–41	Kansas City Americans	AHA	44	15	23	38	19	8	2	3	5	6
1941–42	St. Louis Flyers	AHA	50	18	39	57	12	3	0	0	0	0
1942–43	New Haven Eagles	AHL	28	13	13	26	4	—	—	—	—	—
1942–43	Washington Lions	AHL	23	6	22	28	2	—	—	—	—	—
1943–44	Saint John Garrison	Exhib	6	7	8	15	0	6	8	6	14	10
1943–44	Saint John Beavers	Al-Cup	—	—	—	—	—	9	28	15	43	8
1944–45	Moncton RCAF Flyers	MNDHL	1	3	0	3	0	—	—	—	—	—
1944–45	Saint John Garrison	SJDHL	1	3	0	3	0	—	—	—	—	—
1944–45	Saint John Beavers	Exhib	1	0	1	1	0	—	—	—	—	—
1944–45	Saint John Beavers	Al-Cup	—	—	—	—	—	9	20	13	33	6
1945–46	Moncton Maroons	Exhib	13	27	15	42	11	—	—	—	—	—
1945–46	Moncton Maroons	Al-Cup	—	—	—	—	—	4	15	3	18	2
1946–47	Moncton Hawks	MMHL	32	37	34	71	13	9	8	9	17	2
IAHL/AHL totals			218	56	103	159	52	24	6	8	14	10
NHL totals			26	0	1	1	8	1	0	0	0	0
