= Charlie Mason (ice hockey) =

Canadian ice hockey player

- Born: February 1, 1912; Seaforth, Ontario, Canada
- Died: May 18, 1971 (aged 59)
- Height: 6 ft 0 in (183 cm)
- Weight: 205 lb (93 kg; 14 st 9 lb)
- Position: Right Wing
- Shot: Right
- Played for: Chicago Black Hawks; Detroit Red Wings; New York Americans; New York Rangers
- Playing career: 1932–1942

Charles Charters Mason (February 1, 1912 – May 18, 1971) was a Canadian professional ice hockey right winger who played 93 games with the New York Rangers, New York Americans, Detroit Red Wings, and Chicago Black Hawks in the National Hockey League between 1934 and 1939.

He was born in Seaforth, Ontario.

== Career statistics ==
=== Regular season and playoffs ===
			Regular season					Playoffs
Season	Team	League	GP	G	A	Pts	PIM	GP	G	A	Pts	PIM
1929–30	University of Saskatchewan	N-SSHL	—	—	—	—	—	2	0	0	0	0
1930–31	University of Saskatchewan	N-SSHL	7	1	4	5	4	—	—	—	—	—
1930–31	Saskatoon Westleys	N-SJHL	3	0	1	1	0	2	0	0	0	0
1931–32	Saskatoon Crescents	N-SSHL	16	9	2	11	2	2	0	0	0	0
1931–32	Saskatoon Westleys	N-SJHL	4	4	1	5	2	8	2	0	2	0
1932–33	Saskatoon Crescents	WCHL	29	13	7	20	6	—	—	—	—	—
1933–34	Vancouver Lions	NWHL	33	22	8	30	8	7	3	1	4	2
1934–35	New York Rangers	NHL	46	5	9	14	14	4	0	1	1	0
1935–36	New York Rangers	NHL	28	1	5	6	8	—	—	—	—	—
1935–36	Philadelphia Ramblers	Can-Am	21	8	7	15	9	4	1	0	1	0
1936–37	Philadelphia Ramblers	IAHL	49	24	15	39	17	6	1	2	3	4
1937–38	New York Americans	NHL	2	0	0	0	0	—	—	—	—	—
1937–38	Philadelphia Ramblers	Can-Am	45	24	20	44	11	5	1	1	2	2
1938–39	Detroit Red Wings	NHL	4	0	1	1	0	—	—	—	—	—
1938–39	Pittsburgh Hornets	IAHL	25	8	16	24	4	—	—	—	—	—
1938–39	Chicago Black Hawks	NHL	13	1	3	4	0	—	—	—	—	—
1939–40	Cleveland Barons	IAHL	40	12	12	24	15	—	—	—	—	—
1940–41	Buffalo Bisons	AHL	3	0	0	0	0	—	—	—	—	—
1940–41	Springfield Indians	AHL	41	17	18	35	14	2	0	0	0	0
1941–42	Providence Reds	AHL	15	0	8	8	7	—	—	—	—	—
1941–42	Philadelphia Rockets	AHL	44	7	14	21	4	—	—	—	—	—
IAHL/AHL totals			262	92	103	195	72	13	2	3	5	6
NHL totals			93	7	18	25	22	4	0	1	1	0
