= Max Bennett (ice hockey) =

Canadian ice hockey player

- Born: November 4, 1912 Cobalt, Ontario, Canada
- Died: January 5, 1972 (aged 59) Buffalo, New York, U.S.
- Height: 5 ft 6 in (168 cm)
- Weight: 157 lb (71 kg; 11 st 3 lb)
- Position: Right wing
- Shot: Right
- Played for: Montreal Canadiens
- Playing career: 1931–1945

Max Bennett (November 4, 1912 – January 5, 1972) was a Canadian professional ice hockey right winger who played in one National Hockey League game for the Montreal Canadiens during the 1935–36 season, on February 11, 1935 against the New York Rangers. The rest of his career, which lasted from 1931 to 1945, was spent in the minor leagues.

== Career statistics ==
=== Regular season and playoffs ===
			Regular season					Playoffs
Season	Team	League	GP	G	A	Pts	PIM	GP	G	A	Pts	PIM
1930–31	Iroquois Falls Papermakers	NOJHA	—	—	—	—	—	—	—	—	—	—
1931–32	Falconbridge Falcons	NOHA	7	2	0	2	8	2	0	0	0	0
1931–32	Sudbury Cub-Wolves	NOHA	1	0	0	0	0	—	—	—	—	—
1932–33	Falconbridge Falcons	NOHA	6	4	3	7	0	2	0	1	1	0
1932–33	Falconbridge Falcons	Al-Cup	—	—	—	—	—	5	6	3	9	0
1933–34	Hamilton Tigers	SOHA	23	20	12	32	34	4	6	1	7	6
1933–34	Hamilton Tigers	Al-Cup	—	—	—	—	—	8	5	2	7	2
1934–35	Hamilton Tigers	SOHA	18	19	7	26	17	6	0	1	1	2
1935–36	Montreal Canadiens	NHL	1	0	0	0	0	—	—	—	—	—
1935–36	Springfield Indians	Can-Am	44	6	9	15	25	3	1	0	1	0
1936–37	Springfield Indians	IAHL	1	0	0	0	0	—	—	—	—	—
1936–37	Cleveland Falcons	IAHL	11	2	1	3	8	—	—	—	—	—
1936–37	Syracuse Stars	IAHL	21	7	8	15	8	9	3	4	7	6
1937–38	Syracuse Stars	IAHL	44	20	15	35	18	8	2	6	8	0
1938–39	Syracuse Stars	IAHL	54	15	33	48	18	3	0	1	1	0
1939–40	Syracuse Stars	IAHL	56	25	31	56	10	—	—	—	—	—
1940–41	Buffalo Bisons	AHL	55	12	31	43	22	—	—	—	—	—
1941–42	Buffalo Bisons	AHL	52	19	29	48	14	—	—	—	—	—
1942–43	Buffalo Bisons	AHL	56	20	24	44	19	9	4	5	9	0
1942–43	Washington Lions	AHL	1	0	0	0	0	—	—	—	—	—
1943–44	Buffalo Bisons	AHL	54	21	30	51	17	9	1	6	7	2
1943–44	Pittsburgh Hornets	AHL	1	1	0	1	0	—	—	—	—	—
1944–45	Pittsburgh Hornets	AHL	21	4	11	15	13	—	—	—	—	—
IAHL/AHL totals			427	146	213	359	147	38	10	22	32	8
NHL totals			1	0	0	0	0	—	—	—	—	—

== See also ==
- List of players who played only one game in the NHL
