= Ron Hudson (ice hockey) =

Canadian ice hockey player

- Born: July 14, 1911 Timmins, ON, Canada
- Died: October 11, 1984 (aged 73)
- Height: 5 ft 8 in (173 cm)
- Weight: 148 lb (67 kg; 10 st 8 lb)
- Position: Centre
- Shot: Left
- Played for: Detroit Red Wings
- Playing career: 1931–1945

Ronald Justin Hudson (July 14, 1911 — October 11, 1984) was a Canadian professional ice hockey player.

== Career ==
Hudson played 33 games in the National Hockey League with the Detroit Red Wings between 1937 and 1940. The rest of his career, which lasted from 1931 to 1945, was spent in various minor leagues. Hudson was born in, Timmins, ON.

== Career statistics ==
=== Regular season and playoffs ===
| | | | Regular season | | | | | Playoffs |
| Season | Team | League | GP | G | A | Pts | PIM | GP | G | A | Pts | PIM |
|---|---|---|---|---|---|---|---|---|---|---|---|---|
| 1930–31 | South Porcupine Porkies | NOJHA | — | — | — | — | — | — | — | — | — | — |
| 1931–32 | Truro Bearcats | NSSHL | 16 | 6 | 3 | 9 | 25 | 5 | 0 | 1 | 1 | 0 |
| 1932–33 | Charlottetown Abbies | MSHL | 25 | 5 | 1 | 6 | 27 | 2 | 0 | 0 | 0 | 2 |
| 1933–34 | Charlottetown Abbies | MSHL | 23 | 6 | 8 | 14 | 16 | 3 | 1 | 0 | 1 | 0 |
| 1934–35 | Halifax Wolverines | MSHL | 20 | 6 | 3 | 9 | 14 | — | — | — | — | — |
| 1934–35 | Halifax Wolverines | Big-3 | 4 | 1 | 0 | 1 | 0 | 6 | 5 | 0 | 5 | 6 |
| 1934–35 | Halifax Wolverines | Al-Cup | — | — | — | — | — | 8 | 12 | 2 | 14 | 4 |
| 1935–36 | Detroit Olympics | IHL | 47 | 7 | 19 | 26 | 10 | 6 | 1 | 1 | 2 | 0 |
| 1936–37 | Pittsburgh Hornets | IHAL | 47 | 9 | 7 | 16 | 27 | 5 | 1 | 1 | 2 | 2 |
| 1937–38 | Detroit Red Wings | NHL | 32 | 5 | 2 | 7 | 2 | — | — | — | — | — |
| 1937–38 | Pittsburgh Hornets | IAHL | 14 | 3 | 5 | 8 | 8 | 2 | 0 | 0 | 0 | 0 |
| 1938–39 | Providence Reds | IAHL | 51 | 16 | 22 | 38 | 7 | 5 | 1 | 3 | 4 | 0 |
| 1939–40 | Detroit Red Wings | NHL | 1 | 0 | 0 | 0 | 0 | — | — | — | — | — |
| 1939–40 | Indianapolis Capitals | IAHL | 54 | 27 | 27 | 54 | 19 | 5 | 0 | 1 | 1 | 0 |
| 1940–41 | Omaha Knights | AHA | 47 | 23 | 29 | 52 | 19 | — | — | — | — | — |
| 1941–42 | Omaha Knights | AHA | 44 | 19 | 23 | 42 | 4 | 3 | 1 | 1 | 2 | 0 |
| 1944–45 | St. Louis Flyers | AHL | 21 | 0 | 2 | 2 | 8 | — | — | — | — | — |
| IAHL/AHL totals | | | 187 | 55 | 63 | 118 | 69 | 17 | 2 | 5 | 7 | 2 |
| NHL totals | | | 33 | 5 | 2 | 7 | 2 | — | — | — | — | — |
