= Joe Krol (ice hockey) =

Canadian ice hockey player

- Born: August 13, 1915 Winnipeg, Manitoba, Canada
- Died: October 26, 1993 (aged 78) Calgary, Alberta, Canada
- Height: 5 ft 11 in (180 cm)
- Weight: 173 lb (78 kg; 12 st 5 lb)
- Position: Left wing
- Shot: Left
- Played for: New York Rangers; Brooklyn Americans
- Playing career: 1935–1942

Joseph Krol (August 13, 1915 – October 26, 1993) was a Canadian ice hockey left winger who played 26 games in the National Hockey League with the New York Rangers and Brooklyn Americans. The rest of his career, which lasted from 1935 to 1942, was mainly spent in the minor International American Hockey League/American Hockey League. He was born in Winnipeg, Manitoba.

== Career statistics ==
=== Regular season and playoffs ===
| | | | Regular season | | | | | Playoffs |
| Season | Team | League | GP | G | A | Pts | PIM | GP | G | A | Pts | PIM |
|---|---|---|---|---|---|---|---|---|---|---|---|---|
| 1932–33 | Winnipeg K of C | WJrHL | 11 | 6 | 3 | 9 | 18 | 3 | 1 | 1 | 2 | 2 |
| 1933–34 | Selkirk Fishermen | WJrHL | 14 | 3 | 3 | 6 | 43 | 5 | 0 | 2 | 2 | 13 |
| 1934–35 | Winnipeg Monarchs | WJrHL | 13 | 12 | 7 | 19 | 16 | 3 | 6 | 2 | 8 | 10 |
| 1934–35 | Winnipeg Monarchs | M-Cup | — | — | — | — | — | 9 | 11 | 7 | 18 | 21 |
| 1935–36 | New York Rovers | EAHL | 39 | 16 | 22 | 38 | 47 | 8 | 2 | 0 | 2 | 6 |
| 1936–37 | New York Rangers | NHL | 1 | 0 | 0 | 0 | 0 | — | — | — | — | — |
| 1936–37 | Philadelphia Ramblers | IAHL | 49 | 9 | 18 | 27 | 26 | 6 | 0 | 1 | 1 | 2 |
| 1937–38 | Philadelphia Ramblers | IAHL | 43 | 4 | 10 | 14 | 10 | 4 | 1 | 1 | 2 | 0 |
| 1938–39 | New York Rangers | NHL | 1 | 1 | 1 | 2 | 0 | — | — | — | — | — |
| 1938–39 | Philadelphia Ramblers | IAHL | 54 | 24 | 30 | 54 | 34 | 8 | 2 | 3 | 5 | 4 |
| 1939–40 | Philadelphia Ramblers | IAHL | 52 | 7 | 11 | 18 | 23 | — | — | — | — | — |
| 1940–41 | Hershey Bears | AHL | 46 | 13 | 17 | 30 | 20 | — | — | — | — | — |
| 1940–41 | Springfield Indians | AHL | 6 | 2 | 3 | 5 | 12 | 3 | 0 | 2 | 2 | 2 |
| 1941–42 | Brooklyn Americans | NHL | 24 | 9 | 3 | 12 | 8 | — | — | — | — | — |
| 1941–42 | Springfield Indians | AHL | 18 | 3 | 12 | 15 | 5 | — | — | — | — | — |
| 1942–43 | Vancouver RCAF | NNDHL | 19 | 14 | 16 | 30 | 32 | 2 | 0 | 1 | 1 | 0 |
| 1942–43 | Winnipeg RCAF | WNDHL | — | — | — | — | — | 3 | 0 | 1 | 1 | 2 |
| 1943–44 | Winnipeg RCAF | WNDHL | 9 | 4 | 3 | 7 | 8 | — | — | — | — | — |
| IAHL/AHL totals | | | 268 | 62 | 101 | 163 | 130 | 21 | 3 | 7 | 10 | 8 |
| NHL totals | | | 26 | 10 | 4 | 14 | 8 | — | — | — | — | — |

== Awards and achievements ==
- EAHL First All-Star Team (1936)
