= Norm Locking =

Canadian ice hockey player

- Born: May 24, 1911; Owen Sound, Ontario, Canada
- Died: May 15, 1995 (aged 83)
- Height: 6 ft 0 in (183 cm)
- Weight: 165 lb (75 kg; 11 st 11 lb)
- Position: Left wing
- Shot: Left
- Played for: Chicago Black Hawks
- Playing career: 1931–1944

Norman Wesley Locking (May 24, 1911 – May 15, 1995) was a Canadian ice hockey left winger. He played 48 games in the National Hockey League with the Chicago Black Hawks during the 1934–35 and 1935–36 seasons. The rest of his career, which lasted from 1931 to 1944, was spent in various minor leagues. Locking was born in Owen Sound, Ontario.

== Career statistics ==
=== Regular season and playoffs ===
| | | | Regular season | | | | | Playoffs |
| Season | Team | League | GP | G | A | Pts | PIM | GP | G | A | Pts | PIM |
|---|---|---|---|---|---|---|---|---|---|---|---|---|
| 1931–32 | Pittsburgh Yellow Jackets | IHL | 29 | 2 | 0 | 2 | 12 | — | — | — | — | — |
| 1932–33 | St. Paul Greyhounds | AHA | 39 | 11 | 11 | 22 | 32 | 4 | 1 | 0 | 1 | 10 |
| 1933–34 | Cleveland Indians | IHL | 40 | 24 | 10 | 34 | 21 | — | — | — | — | — |
| 1934–35 | Chicago Black Hawks | NHL | 35 | 2 | 5 | 7 | 19 | — | — | — | — | — |
| 1935–36 | Chicago Black Hawks | NHL | 13 | 0 | 1 | 1 | 7 | — | — | — | — | — |
| 1935–36 | London Tecumsehs | IHL | 33 | 11 | 12 | 23 | 22 | 2 | 0 | 0 | 0 | 0 |
| 1936–37 | Buffalo Bisons | IAHL | 11 | 1 | 4 | 5 | 8 | — | — | — | — | — |
| 1936–37 | Syracuse Stars | IAHL | 36 | 12 | 13 | 25 | 26 | 9 | 1 | 3 | 4 | 2 |
| 1937–38 | Syracuse Stars | IAHL | 48 | 19 | 17 | 36 | 13 | 8 | 4 | 3 | 7 | 0 |
| 1938–39 | Syracuse Stars | IAHL | 53 | 20 | 30 | 50 | 28 | 3 | 0 | 1 | 1 | 2 |
| 1939–40 | Syracuse Stars | IAHL | 55 | 31 | 32 | 63 | 12 | — | — | — | — | — |
| 1940–41 | Cleveland Barons | AHL | 52 | 25 | 19 | 44 | 27 | 9 | 0 | 4 | 4 | 4 |
| 1941–42 | Cleveland Barons | AHL | 54 | 14 | 32 | 46 | 7 | 5 | 1 | 1 | 2 | 0 |
| 1942–43 | Cleveland Barons | AHL | 56 | 26 | 40 | 66 | 14 | 3 | 1 | 2 | 3 | 2 |
| 1943–44 | Cleveland Barons | AHL | 19 | 9 | 9 | 18 | 0 | 11 | 0 | 6 | 6 | 0 |
| IAHL/AHL totals | | | 384 | 157 | 196 | 353 | 135 | 48 | 7 | 20 | 27 | 10 |
| NHL totals | | | 48 | 2 | 6 | 8 | 26 | — | — | — | — | — |
