= Don Deacon =

Canadian ice hockey player

- Born: June 2, 1912 Regina, Saskatchewan, Canada
- Died: December 25, 1943 (aged 31) Vancouver, British Columbia, Canada
- Height: 5 ft 9 in (175 cm)
- Weight: 190 lb (86 kg; 13 st 8 lb)
- Position: Left wing
- Shot: Left
- Played for: Detroit Red Wings
- Playing career: 1935–1942

Donald John Deacon (June 2, 1912 – December 25, 1943) was a Canadian ice hockey winger who played parts of three seasons for the Detroit Red Wings of the National Hockey League from 1936 to 1940.

On December 25, 1943, Deacon fell from his second floor balcony while having a Christmas party with family and friends. He was pronounced dead on impact. After analyzing Deacon's body, it was determined that Deacon fell on his head, fracturing his skull and killing him immediately. It was also reported that Deacon was intoxicated. His death was ruled as an accident. He was 31 years old.

== Career statistics ==
=== Regular season and playoffs ===
			Regular season					Playoffs
Season	Team	League	GP	G	A	Pts	PIM	GP	G	A	Pts	PIM
1929–30	Regina Olympics	RCJHL	1	0	0	0	0	—	—	—	—	—
1930–31	Regina Pats	S-SJHL	3	1	0	1	4	—	—	—	—	—
1930–31	Regina Pats	M-Cup	—	—	—	—	—	1	0	0	0	0
1931–32	Regina Pats	S-SJHL	4	1	0	1	0	2	3	0	3	0
1931–32	Regina Pats	M-Cup	—	—	—	—	—	4	1	0	1	9
1932–33	Prince Albert Mintos	SSHL	18	6	1	7	31	—	—	—	—	—
1932–33	Prince Albert Mintos	Al-Cup	—	—	—	—	—	3	1	0	1	6
1933–34	Prince Albert Mintos	SSHL	15	13	7	20	28	4	3	0	3	2
1933–34	Prince Albert Mintos	Al-Cup	—	—	—	—	—	2	1	0	1	0
1934–35	Prince Albert Mintos	SSHL	22	26	10	36	44	—	—	—	—	—
1935–36	Detroit Olympics	IHL	44	14	17	31	70	6	1	4	5	7
1936–37	Detroit Red Wings	NHL	4	0	0	0	2	—	—	—	—	—
1936–37	Pittsburgh Hornets	IAHL	43	14	15	29	18	5	2	2	4	14
1937–38	Pittsburgh Hornets	IAHL	42	18	19	37	28	2	0	3	3	0
1938–39	Detroit Red Wings	NHL	6	1	3	4	2	2	2	1	3	0
1938–39	Pittsburgh Hornets	IAHL	46	25	41	66	41	—	—	—	—	—
1939–40	Detroit Red Wings	NHL	17	5	1	6	2	—	—	—	—	—
1939–40	Indianapolis Capitals	IAHL	21	7	18	25	18	—	—	—	—	—
1939–40	Cleveland Barons	IAHL	18	6	7	13	8	—	—	—	—	—
1940–41	Cleveland Barons	AHL	53	15	15	30	46	9	1	5	6	10
1941–42	Cleveland Barons	AHL	49	13	14	27	15	1	1	0	1	0
1942–43	Calgary Currie Army	CNDHL	23	21	31	52	39	3	4	2	6	2
1942–43	Calgary Currie Army	Al-Cup	—	—	—	—	—	5	4	5	9	2
IAHL/AHL totals			272	98	129	227	174	17	4	10	14	24
NHL totals			27	6	4	10	6	2	2	1	3	0

== See also ==
- List of ice hockey players who died during their playing careers
