= Lorne Duguid =

Canadian ice hockey player

- Born: April 4, 1910; Bolton, Ontario, Canada
- Died: March 21, 1981 (aged 70); Toronto, Ontario, Canada
- Height: 5 ft 11 in (180 cm)
- Weight: 185 lb (84 kg; 13 st 3 lb)
- Position: Left wing
- Shot: Left
- Played for: Boston Bruins; Chicago Black Hawks; Detroit Red Wings
- Playing career: 1952–1964

Lorne Wallace Duguid (April 4, 1910 – March 21, 1981) was a Canadian professional ice hockey player, who played 135 games in the National Hockey League between 1931 and 1937 with the Montreal Maroons, Detroit Red Wings, and Boston Bruins.

Duguid scored his first NHL goal as a member of the Montreal Maroons. It came in Boston Garden on January 17, 1933 in the Maroons' 6-2 loss to the Boston Bruins.

He was born in Bolton, Ontario.

== Career statistics ==
=== Regular season and playoffs ===
			Regular season					Playoffs
Season	Team	League	GP	G	A	Pts	PIM	GP	G	A	Pts	PIM
1927–28	Montreal Victorias	MCJHL	11	10	0	10	4	—	—	—	—	—
1928–29	Montreal Victorias	MJCHL	10	8	0	8	14	—	—	—	—	—
1929–30	Montreal Victorias	MRTHL	10	3	0	3	12	1	0	0	0	0
1930–31	Windsor Bulldogs	IHL	48	22	19	41	13	6	3	2	5	6
1931–32	Montreal Maroons	NHL	13	0	0	0	6	—	—	—	—	—
1931–32	Windsor Bulldogs	IHL	35	11	8	19	36	6	2	1	3	4
1932–33	Montreal Maroons	NHL	48	4	7	11	38	2	0	0	0	4
1933–34	Montreal Maroons	NHL	5	0	1	1	0	—	—	—	—	—
1933–34	Windsor Bulldogs	IHL	38	13	9	22	34	—	—	—	—	—
1934–35	Detroit Red Wings	NHL	34	3	3	6	9	—	—	—	—	—
1934–35	Detroit Olympics	IHL	17	12	5	17	0	—	—	—	—	—
1935–36	Detroit Red Wings	NHL	5	0	0	0	0	—	—	—	—	—
1935–36	Detroit Olympics	IHL	12	4	6	10	14	—	—	—	—	—
1935–36	Boston Bruins	NHL	29	1	4	5	2	2	1	0	1	2
1936–37	Boston Bruins	NHL	1	1	0	1	2	—	—	—	—	—
1936–37	Providence Reds	IAHL	49	20	21	41	16	3	2	0	2	2
1937–38	Cleveland Barons	IAHL	48	22	27	49	22	2	1	1	2	0
1938–39	Cleveland Barons	IAHL	54	19	32	51	23	9	2	7	9	4
1939–40	Cleveland Barons	IAHL	24	5	6	11	18	—	—	—	—	—
1939–40	Pittsburgh Hornets	IAHL	20	4	6	10	8	9	1	0	1	2
1940–41	Pittsburgh Hornets	AHL	48	7	21	28	12	6	1	0	1	4
IAHL/AHL totals			243	77	113	190	99	29	7	8	15	12
NHL totals			135	9	15	24	57	4	1	0	1	6
