= Eddie Convey =

Canadian ice hockey player (1909–1969)

- Born: December 16, 1909; Toronto, Ontario, Canada
- Died: February 22, 1969 (aged 59)
- Height: 5 ft 11 in (180 cm)
- Weight: 165 lb (75 kg; 11 st 11 lb)
- Position: Left wing
- Shot: Right
- Played for: New York Americans
- Playing career: 1929–1941

John Edward Convey (December 16, 1909 – February 22, 1969) was a Canadian ice hockey left winger. He played in the NHL for the New York Americans between 1931 and 1933. The rest of his career, which lasted from 1929 to 1941, was spent in various minor leagues. He was born in Toronto, Ontario.

== Career statistics ==
=== Regular season and playoffs ===
			Regular season					Playoffs
Season	Team	League	GP	G	A	Pts	PIM	GP	G	A	Pts	PIM
1926–27	Toronto St. Michael's Majors	OHA	6	1	2	3	—	6	0	1	1	—
1927–28	Toronto St. Michael's Majors	OHA	6	12	6	18	—	6	7	6	13	—
1928–29	Toronto St. Michael's Majors	OHA	7	7	2	9	—	2	0	1	1	—
1928–29	Toronto St. Michael's Majors	M-Cup	—	—	—	—	—	13	8	12	20	18
1929–30	Toronto Nationals	OHA Sr	9	2	2	4	33	2	0	0	0	2
1930–31	New Haven Eagles	Can-Am	32	7	6	13	98	—	—	—	—	—
1931–32	New York Americans	NHL	21	1	0	1	21	—	—	—	—	—
1931–32	New Haven Eagles	Can-Am	23	5	11	16	28	2	1	1	2	0
1932–33	New York Americans	NHL	13	0	1	1	12	—	—	—	—	—
1932–33	New Haven Eagles	Can-Am	38	8	6	14	81	—	—	—	—	—
1933–34	Buffalo Bisons	IHL	44	4	8	12	35	6	0	1	1	12
1934–35	Windsor Bulldogs	IHL	44	24	17	41	54	—	—	—	—	—
1935–36	Syracuse Stars	IHL	45	20	19	39	58	2	2	0	2	0
1936–37	Syracuse Stars	IAHL	50	12	37	49	82	9	2	4	6	19
1937–38	Syracuse Stars	IAHL	48	19	33	52	42	8	2	3	5	0
1938–39	Syracuse Stars	IAHL	54	14	25	39	30	3	1	1	2	0
1939–40	Syracuse Stars	IAHL	53	17	33	50	24	—	—	—	—	—
1940–41	Pittsburgh Hornets	AHL	56	15	28	43	22	6	2	0	2	4
IAHL/AHL totals			261	77	156	233	200	26	7	8	15	23
NHL totals			34	1	1	2	35	—	—	—	—	—
