= Jacques Toupin =

Canadian ice hockey player

- Born: November 10, 1910; Trois-Rivières, Quebec, Canada
- Died: February 17, 1987 (aged 76)
- Height: 5 ft 7 in (170 cm)
- Weight: 155 lb (70 kg; 11 st 1 lb)
- Position: Right wing
- Shot: Right
- Played for: Chicago Black Hawks
- Playing career: 1928–1946

Joseph Onésime Zephirin Jean Jacques Toupin (November 10, 1910 – February 17, 1987) was a Canadian ice hockey player who played eight games in the National Hockey League with the Chicago Black Hawks during the 1943–44 season. The rest of his career, which lasted from 1928 to 1946, was spent in the minor leagues. Toupin was born in Trois-Rivières, Quebec in 1910.

== Career statistics ==
=== Regular season and playoffs ===
| | | | Regular season | | | | | Playoffs |
| Season | Team | League | GP | G | A | Pts | PIM | GP | G | A | Pts | PIM |
|---|---|---|---|---|---|---|---|---|---|---|---|---|
| 1928–29 | Trois-Rivières Renards | ECHA | 21 | 9 | 1 | 10 | 12 | — | — | — | — | — |
| 1929–30 | Trois-Rivières Renards | ECHA | 9 | 4 | 3 | 7 | 12 | — | — | — | — | — |
| 1930–31 | Trois-Rivières Renards | ECHA | 18 | 9 | 13 | 22 | 15 | 2 | 0 | 0 | 0 | 2 |
| 1931–32 | Quebec Castors | ECHA | 24 | 13 | 8 | 21 | 12 | 3 | 3 | 6 | 9 | 0 |
| 1932–33 | Quebec Castors | Can-Am | 48 | 13 | 23 | 36 | 24 | — | — | — | — | — |
| 1933–34 | Quebec Castors | Can-Am | 40 | 12 | 14 | 26 | 14 | — | — | — | — | — |
| 1934–35 | Quebec Castors | Can-Am | 27 | 5 | 10 | 15 | 0 | — | — | — | — | — |
| 1934–35 | London Tecumsehs | IHL | 15 | 2 | 8 | 10 | 0 | 5 | 2 | 2 | 4 | 2 |
| 1935–36 | Springfield Indians | Can-Am | 47 | 18 | 15 | 33 | 20 | 3 | 1 | 2 | 3 | 2 |
| 1936–37 | Springfield Indians | IAHL | 45 | 13 | 24 | 37 | 6 | 5 | 0 | 1 | 1 | 4 |
| 1937–38 | Springfield Indians | IAHL | 48 | 11 | 19 | 30 | 24 | — | — | — | — | — |
| 1938–39 | Springfield Indians | IAHL | 53 | 8 | 31 | 39 | 16 | 3 | 0 | 0 | 0 | 0 |
| 1939–40 | Springfield Indians | IAHL | 49 | 16 | 34 | 50 | 12 | — | — | — | — | — |
| 1940–41 | Buffalo Bisons | AHL | 48 | 21 | 22 | 43 | 15 | — | — | — | — | — |
| 1941–42 | Buffalo Bisons | AHL | 56 | 15 | 36 | 51 | 34 | — | — | — | — | — |
| 1942–43 | Providence Reds | AHL | 53 | 22 | 39 | 61 | 8 | 2 | 0 | 2 | 2 | 0 |
| 1943–44 | Chicago Black Hawks | NHL | 8 | 1 | 2 | 3 | 0 | — | — | — | — | — |
| 1943–44 | Providence Reds | AHL | 25 | 16 | 26 | 42 | 14 | — | — | — | — | — |
| 1944–45 | Shawinigan Falls Cataractes | QSHL | 22 | 23 | 25 | 48 | 6 | 6 | 5 | 4 | 9 | 0 |
| 1944–45 | Valleyfield Braves | QSHL | — | — | — | — | — | 5 | 2 | 1 | 3 | 2 |
| 1944–45 | Valleyfield Braves | Al-Cup | — | — | — | — | — | 3 | 2 | 2 | 4 | 0 |
| 1945–46 | Shawinigan Falls Cataractes | QSHL | 24 | 13 | 12 | 25 | 22 | 4 | 0 | 0 | 0 | 10 |
| IAHL/AHL totals | | | 377 | 122 | 231 | 353 | 129 | 10 | 0 | 3 | 3 | 4 |
| NHL totals | | | 8 | 1 | 2 | 3 | 0 | — | — | — | — | — |
