= Bob Carse =

Canadian ice hockey player (1919–1999)

- Postcard of Bob Carse with the Montreal Canadiens, 1947
- Born: July 19, 1919 Edmonton, Alberta, Canada
- Died: July 27, 1999 (aged 80) Westlake, Ohio, United States
- Height: 5 ft 9 in (175 cm)
- Weight: 160 lb (73 kg; 11 st 6 lb)
- Position: Left wing
- Shot: Left
- Played for: Chicago Black Hawks; Montreal Canadiens
- Playing career: 1939–1950

Robert Allison Carse (July 19, 1919 – July 27, 1999) was a Canadian ice hockey forward who played 166 games in the National Hockey League with the Chicago Black Hawks and Montreal Canadiens between 1940 and 1947. The rest of his career, which lasted from 1939 to 1950, was spent in the minor leagues.

His career was interrupted by World War II military service. In 1944, Carse was shot in the shoulder and captured by German forces. After six months of marching from camp to camp, Carse had lost 60 pounds from malnutrition. After returning from Europe, his rights were traded from the Black Hawks to the Canadiens. He was honoured with a "Bob Carse night" in the Edmonton Junior Hockey League, arranged by Art Potter and John Ducey as a tribute to Carse who was a recent prisoner of war, and to recognize other junior hockey players who died during World War II.

Carse was inducted into the Cleveland Sports Hall of Fame in 1976 for his on-ice career with the Cleveland Barons, service as an AHL Linesman and the organization of the Parma Hockey Program. He was also inducted into the Cleveland Barons Hall of Fame (1971). His brother Bill Carse also played in the NHL.

== Career statistics ==
=== Regular season and playoffs ===
			Regular season					Playoffs
Season	Team	League	GP	G	A	Pts	PIM	GP	G	A	Pts	PIM
1935–36	Edmonton Athletic Club	EJrHL	12	1	6	7	9	—	—	—	—	—
1936–37	Edmonton Athletic Club	EJrHL	11	8	6	14	25	3	1	1	2	2
1937–38	Edmonton Athletic Club	EJrHL	15	11	5	16	25	4	3	13	16	8
1937–38	Edmonton Athletic Club	M-Cup	—	—	—	—	—	11	13	2	15	20
1938–39	Edmonton Athletic Club	EJrHL	7	12	9	21	8	2	3	0	3	5
1938–39	Edmonton Athletic Club	M-Cup	—	—	—	—	—	12	12	8	20	10
1939–40	Chicago Black Hawks	NHL	22	3	5	8	11	2	0	0	0	0
1939–40	Providence Reds	IAHL	31	5	12	17	9	6	3	2	5	2
1940–41	Chicago Black Hawks	NHL	43	10	8	18	9	5	0	0	0	2
1941–42	Chicago Black Hawks	NHL	33	7	16	23	10	3	0	2	2	0
1941–42	Kansas City Greyhounds	AHA	18	9	13	22	9	—	—	—	—	—
1942–43	Chicago Black Hawks	NHL	46	10	22	32	6	—	—	—	—	—
1943–44	Calgary Currie Army	CNDHL	16	8	12	20	16	2	0	5	5	0
1945–46	Edmonton Flyers	WCSHL	36	32	46	78	18	8	5	5	10	8
1946–47	Cleveland Barons	AHL	62	27	61	88	16	4	0	0	0	0
1947–48	Montreal Canadiens	NHL	22	3	3	6	16	—	—	—	—	—
1947–48	Cleveland Barons	AHL	43	21	33	54	14	9	4	5	9	4
1948–49	Cleveland Barons	AHL	65	18	47	65	28	5	1	3	4	4
1949–50	Cleveland Barons	AHL	69	30	52	82	23	9	3	4	7	4
IAHL/AHL totals			270	101	205	306	90	33	11	14	25	14
NHL totals			166	33	54	87	52	10	0	2	2	2
