= Hergesheimer =

Hergesheimer is a surname. Notable persons with the name include:

- Ella Sophonisba Hergesheimer (1873-1943), American illustrator, painter and printmaker
- Joseph Hergesheimer (1880-1954), American novelist
- Phil Hergesheimer (1914-2004), Canadian ice hockey player
- Wally Hergesheimer (1927-2014), Canadian ice hockey player
