= 1938–39 NHL transactions =

The following is a list of all team-to-team transactions that have occurred in the National Hockey League (NHL) during the 1938–39 NHL season. It lists which team each player has been traded to and for which player(s) or other consideration(s), if applicable.

== Transactions ==
August 28, 1938	To Montreal Canadiens Louis Trudel	To Chicago Black Hawks Joffre Desilets
September 14, 1938	To Montreal Maroons cash	To Montreal Canadiens Stewart Evans; Des Smith; Bob Gracie rights to Claude Bourque
September 15, 1938	To Montreal Maroons $30,000 cash	To Chicago Black Hawks Russ Blinco; Baldy Northcott; Earl Robinson
September 24, 1938	To Montreal Maroons cash	To Montreal Canadiens Herb Cain; Buddy O'Connor
October 12, 1938	To Toronto Maple Leafs $16,000 cash	To Detroit Red Wings^{1} Charlie Conacher
October 21, 1938	To Detroit Red Wings Charlie Mason	To New York Rangers cash
October 24, 1938	To Boston Bruins cash	To New York Americans Leroy Goldsworthy loan of Art Jackson for the 1938-39 season
November 3, 1938	To Toronto Maple Leafs Gus Marker	To Montreal Maroons $4,000 cash
November 15, 1938	To Toronto Maple Leafs Norman Mann	To New York Rangers $4,000 cash
November 25, 1938	To Montreal Canadiens cash	To Chicago Black Hawks Bob Gracie
November 28, 1938	To Boston Bruins $15,000 cash rights to Normie Smith	To Detroit Red Wings Tiny Thompson
December 8, 1938	To Toronto Maple Leafs Elwin Romnes	To Chicago Black Hawks Bill Thoms
December 13, 1938	To New York Americans John Sorrell	To Detroit Red Wings Hap Emms
December 19, 1938	To Toronto Maple Leafs Bucko McDonald	To Detroit Red Wings Bill Thomson $10,000 cash
December 28, 1938	To Boston Bruins loan of Harvey Teno for remainder of 1938-39 season	To Detroit Red Wings unknown
January 16, 1939	To Chicago Black Hawks Joe Cooper	To New York Rangers Alex Levinsky cash
January 27, 1939	To Detroit Red Wings Phil Besler	To Chicago Black Hawks Charlie Mason

Notes

1. The Red Wings holding option of contract renewal. Returned to Toronto after Detroit failed to renew contract on July 1, 1939.
