= List of NHL players (T) =

This is a list of National Hockey League (NHL) players who have played at least one game in the NHL from 1917 to present and have a last name that starts with "T".

List updated as of the 2023–24 NHL season.

== Ta ==
- Rick Tabaracci
- Jeff Taffe
- John Taft
- Peter Taglianetti
- Kari Takko
- Dean Talafous
- Ron Talakoski
- Cam Talbot
- Jean-Guy Talbot
- Maxime Talbot
- Barry Tallackson
- Rob Tallas
- Henrik Tallinder
- Dale Tallon
- Jeff Tambellini
- Steve Tambellini
- Chris Tamer
- Dave Tanabe
- Chris Tancill
- Brandon Tanev
- Christopher Tanev
- Eric Tangradi
- Alex Tanguay
- Christian Tanguay
- Don Tannahill
- John Tanner
- Tony Tanti
- Matt Taormina
- Brad Tapper
- Vladimir Tarasenko
- Daniil Tarasov
- Daniil Tarasov
- Jamie Tardif
- Marc Tardif
- Patrice Tardif
- Iiro Tarkki
- Nick Tarnasky
- Dick Tarnstrom
- Tomas Tatar
- Mikhail Tatarinov
- Dave Tataryn
- Spence Tatchell
- Petr Taticek
- Bill Taugher
- John Tavares
- Billy Taylor (born 1919)
- Billy Taylor (born 1942)
- Bob Taylor
- Bobby Taylor
- Chris Taylor
- Daniel Taylor
- Dave Taylor
- Harry Taylor
- Mark Taylor
- Ralph Taylor
- Ted Taylor
- Tim Taylor

== Te ==
- Alan "Skip" Teal
- Jeff Teal
- Vic "Skeeter" Teal
- Joel Teasdale
- Greg Tebbutt
- Mattias Tedenby
- Mikael Tellqvist
- Petr Tenkrat
- Matt Tennyson
- Harvey Teno
- Joey Tenute
- Stephen Tepper
- Teuvo Teravainen
- Paul Terbenche
- Chris Terreri
- Greg Terrion
- Bill Terry
- Chris Terry
- Troy Terry
- Dmitri Tertyshny
- Orval Tessier
- Joey Tetarenko
- Colten Teubert
- Josh Teves
- Alexandre Texier
- Alexei Tezikov

== Th ==
- Ryan Thang
- Greg Theberge
- Mats Thelin
- Michael Thelven
- Jose Theodore
- Shea Theodore
- Chris Therien
- Gaston Therrien
- Gilles Thibaudeau
- Jocelyn Thibault
- Larry Thibeault
- Brad Thiessen
- Leo Thiffault
- Akil Thomas
- Ben Thomas
- Bill Thomas
- Christian Thomas
- Cy Thomas
- Reg Thomas
- Robert Thomas
- Scott Thomas
- Steve Thomas
- Tim Thomas
- Wayne Thomas
- Dave Thomlinson
- Brent Thompson
- Cecil "Tiny" Thompson
- Cliff Thompson
- Errol Thompson
- Jack Thompson
- Kenneth Thompson
- Logan Thompson
- Nate Thompson
- Paul Thompson (born 1906)
- Paul Thompson (born 1988)
- Rocky Thompson
- Tage Thompson
- Tyce Thompson
- Bill Thoms
- Ben Thomson
- Bill Thomson
- Floyd Thomson
- Jim Thomson
- Jimmy Thomson
- Lassi Thomson
- Rhys Thomson
- Chris Thorburn
- Patrick Thoresen
- Tom Thornbury
- Joe Thornton
- Scott Thornton
- Shawn Thornton
- Joe Thorsteinson
- Henry Thrun
- Andreas Thuresson
- Fred Thurier
- Calvin Thurkauf
- Tom Thurlby
- Mario Thyer

== Ti–Tl ==
- Billy Tibbetts
- Milan Tichy
- Alec Tidey
- Chris Tierney
- Viktor Tikhonov
- Esa Tikkanen
- Brad Tiley
- Tom Tilley
- Mattias Timander
- Dmytro Timashov
- Ray Timgren
- Conor Timmins
- Scott Timmins
- Jussi Timonen
- Kimmo Timonen
- Jarred Tinordi
- Mark Tinordi
- Dave Tippett
- Owen Tippett
- Morris Titanic
- German Titov
- Daniel Tjarnqvist
- Mathias Tjarnqvist
- Brady Tkachuk
- Keith Tkachuk
- Matthew Tkachuk
- Vladimir Tkachyov
- Daniel Tkaczuk
- Walt Tkaczuk
- Jiri Tlusty

== To ==
- Mike Toal
- Ryan Tobler
- Rick Tocchet
- Kevin Todd
- Devon Toews
- Jonathan Toews
- Tyler Toffoli
- Hannu Toivonen
- Dustin Tokarski
- Sergey Tolchinsky
- Ole-Kristian Tollefsen
- Denis Tolpeko
- Eeli Tolvanen
- Glenn Tomalty
- Philip Tomasino
- Matt Tomkins
- Mike Tomlak
- Dave Tomlinson
- Kirk Tomlinson
- Jeff Toms
- Jack Tomson
- John Tonelli
- Dominic Toninato
- Tim Tookey
- Sean Toomey
- Jordin Tootoo
- Shayne Toporowski
- Jerry Toppazzini
- Zellio Toppazzini
- Mike Torchia
- Josh Tordjman
- Pavel Torgayev
- Jari Torkki
- Antti Tormanen
- Alexei Toropchenko
- Raffi Torres
- Vesa Toskala
- Bill Touhey
- Jack Toupin
- Art Townsend
- Graeme Townshend

== Tr–Ts ==
- Brayden Tracey
- Larry Trader
- Wes "Bucko" Trainor
- Bobby Trapp
- Doug Trapp
- Percy Traub
- Patrick Traverse
- Dan Trebil
- Brock Tredway
- Andrei Trefilov
- Brent Tremblay
- Gilles Tremblay
- J. C. Tremblay
- Marcel Tremblay
- Mario Tremblay
- Nils Tremblay
- Vincent Tremblay
- Yannick Tremblay
- Yakov Trenin
- Pascal Trepanier
- Niklas Treutle
- Tim Trimper
- John Tripp
- Pavel Trnka
- Vincent Trocheck
- Corey Tropp
- Zach Trotman
- Brock Trotter
- Bryan Trottier
- Dave Trottier
- Guy Trottier
- Rocky Trottier
- Jacob Trouba
- Jean-Guy Trudel
- Louis Trudel
- Rene Trudell
- Alexander True
- Nikita Tryamkin
- Nikos Tselios
- Nikolai Tsulygin
- Denis Tsygurov
- Vladimir Tsyplakov

== Tu–Ty ==
- Alex Tuch
- Darcy Tucker
- John Tucker
- Ted Tucker
- Tyler Tucker
- Connie Tudin
- Rob Tudor
- Al Tuer
- Riley Tufte
- Ron Tugnutt
- Lauri Tukonen
- Marko Tuomainen
- Marty Turco
- Alex Turcotte
- Alfie Turcotte
- Darren Turcotte
- Roman Turek
- Dominic Turgeon
- Pierre Turgeon
- Sylvain Turgeon
- Gordon Turlick
- Ian Turnbull
- Perry Turnbull
- Randy Turnbull
- Travis Turnbull
- Bob Turner
- Brad Turner
- Dean Turner
- Joe Turner
- Kyle Turris
- Norman Tustin
- Aud Tuten
- Brian Tutt
- Steve Tuttle
- Tony Tuzzolino
- Oleg Tverdovsky
- Roman Tvrdon
- Carsen Twarynski
- Tony Twist
- T. J. Tynan
- Dana Tyrell
- Fedor Tyutin

== See also ==
- hockeydb.com NHL Player List - T
