= Toupin =

Toupin is a surname. Notable people with the name include:

- Antoine Toupin or Antoine Becks (born 1981), Canadian-American musician, producer, actor
- Felix A. Toupin (1886–1965), American lawyer and politician
- Fernand Toupin (1930–2009), Canadian painter
- Jack Toupin (1910–1987), Canadian ice hockey player
- Jacques Toupin or Jacques Jansen (1913–2002), French opera singer
- Marie Aioe Dorion Venier Toupin (c. 1786–1850), member of Pacific Northwest expedition
- Marie-Chantal Toupin (born 1971), Canadian musician
- Normand Toupin, Canadian politician
- Paul Toupin (1918–1993), Canadian journalist, essayist and playwright
- Rene Toupin (1934–2014), Canadian politician
- Robert Toupin (born 1949), Canadian politician

== See also ==
- Taupin (surname)
