= Bill Carse =

Canadian ice hockey player (1914–2000)

- Born: May 29, 1914 Edmonton, Alberta, Canada
- Died: October 31, 2000 (aged 86)
- Height: 5 ft 9 in (175 cm)
- Weight: 160 lb (73 kg; 11 st 6 lb)
- Position: Left wing
- Shot: Left
- Played for: New York Rangers; Chicago Black Hawks
- Playing career: 1934–1950

William Alexander Carse (May 29, 1914 – October 31, 2000) was a Canadian professional ice hockey forward who played 122 games in the National Hockey League for the Chicago Black Hawks and New York Rangers between 1938 and 1942. The rest of his career, which lasted from 1934 to 1950, was spent in the minor leagues. He was born in Edmonton, Alberta. He is the brother of Bob Carse.

== Career statistics ==
=== Regular season and playoffs ===
			Regular season					Playoffs
Season	Team	League	GP	G	A	Pts	PIM	GP	G	A	Pts	PIM
1930–31	Edmonton Strathconas	EJrHL	1	1	0	1	0	—	—	—	—	—
1931–32	Edmonton Strathconas	EJrHL	1	1	0	1	0	—	—	—	—	—
1931–32	Edmonton Canadians	EJrHL	12	2	1	3	—	—	—	—	—	—
1932–33	Edmonton Canadians	EJrHL	12	—	—	—	16	3	2	0	2	6
1932–33	Edmonton Canadians	M-Cup	—	—	—	—	—	3	2	1	3	12
1933–34	Edmonton Athletic Club	EJrHL	9	6	2	8	12	2	4	0	4	4
1933–34	Edmonton Athletic Club	M-Cup	—	—	—	—	—	13	21	11	32	16
1934–35	Edmonton Eskimos	NWHL	28	19	13	32	27	—	—	—	—	—
1935–36	Edmonton Eskimos	NWHL	24	10	7	17	27	—	—	—	—	—
1936–37	Vancouver Lions	NWHL	15	7	1	8	6	5	0	0	0	4
1936–37	Vancouver Lions	PCHL	40	29	9	38	40	3	1	0	1	2
1937–38	Philadelphia Ramblers	IAHL	48	15	25	40	26	5	1	2	3	0
1938–39	New York Rangers	NHL	1	0	1	1	0	5	1	1	2	0
1938–39	Philadelphia Ramblers	IAHL	54	24	33	57	22	5	1	4	5	0
1939–40	Chicago Black Hawks	NHL	48	10	12	22	10	2	1	0	1	0
1940–41	Chicago Black Hawks	NHL	32	4	13	17	12	2	0	0	0	0
1941–42	Chicago Black Hawks	NHL	43	13	14	27	16	3	1	1	2	0
1942–43	Victoria Army	PCHL	20	21	23	44	8	5	4	6	10	0
1942–43	Victoria Army	Al-Cup	—	—	—	—	—	13	10	15	25	12
1943–44	Nanaimo Clippers	PCHL	3	0	3	3	0	—	—	—	—	—
1945–46	Vancouver Canucks	PCHL	56	38	43	81	22	10	6	7	13	2
1947–48	Vancouver Canucks	PCHL	63	19	40	59	44	13	4	10	14	4
1948–49	Vancouver Canucks	PCHL	70	29	64	93	12	3	1	2	3	0
1949–50	Vancouver Canucks	PCHL	41	9	13	22	2	—	—	—	—	—
PCHL totals			293	145	195	340	128	34	16	25	41	8
NHL totals			124	27	40	67	38	12	3	2	5	0
