= Marcel Tremblay (ice hockey) =

Canadian ice hockey player (1915–1980)

- Born: July 4, 1915 Saint Boniface, Manitoba, Canada
- Died: March 20, 1980 (aged 64) Mobile, Alabama, US
- Height: 5 ft 8 in (173 cm)
- Weight: 165 lb (75 kg; 11 st 11 lb)
- Position: Right wing
- Shot: Right
- Played for: Montreal Canadiens
- Playing career: 1936–1942

Marcel Bernard Tremblay (July 4, 1915 – March 20, 1980) was a Canadian professional ice hockey right winger. He played 10 games in the National Hockey League for the Montreal Canadiens during the 1938–39 season. The rest of his career, which lasted from 1936 to 1942, was spent in the minor leagues.

== Biography ==
Tremblay had played for several years with the senior Flin Flon Bombers when he signed with the Montreal Canadiens organization in 1938. He was assigned to the New Haven Eagles, but played ten games for the Canadiens that season. He returned to New Haven and played with the team until 1942 when a fractured skull ended his season. Tremblay enlisted in the military and did not play professionally again.

He died on March 20, 1980, in Mobile, Alabama, and is buried there.

== Career statistics ==
=== Regular season and playoffs ===
			Regular season					Playoffs
Season	Team	League	GP	G	A	Pts	PIM	GP	G	A	Pts	PIM
1932–33	Winnipeg Monarchs	WDJHL	10	8	1	9	2	—	—	—	—	—
1933–34	Winnipeg Blues	MJHL	14	6	4	10	2	3	1	1	2	4
1936–37	Flin Flon Bombers	SSHL	16	11	5	16	14	6	5	2	7	2
1937–38	Flin Flon Bombers	SSHL	19	19	10	29	22	—	—	—	—	—
1938–39	Montreal Canadiens	NHL	10	0	2	2	0	—	—	—	—	—
1938–39	New Haven Eagles	IAHL	26	5	13	18	6	3	2	0	2	0
1939–40	New Haven Eagles	IAHL	51	23	24	47	23	—	—	—	—	—
1940–41	New Haven Eagles	AHL	48	11	18	29	24	2	0	0	0	0
1941–42	New Haven Eagles	AHL	20	7	5	12	18	—	—	—	—	—
1944–45	Montreal Army	MCHL	2	0	0	0	0	—	—	—	—	—
IAHL/AHL totals			145	46	60	106	71	5	2	0	2	0
NHL totals			10	0	2	2	0	—	—	—	—	—
