= Taupin (surname) =

Taupin is a surname. Notable people with the name include:

- André Taupin (1909–1979), French sports shooter
- Bernie Taupin (born 1950), English lyricist, poet, and singer
- Eloi Charlemagne Taupin (1767–1814), French army general
- Michaël Taupin (born 1972), French archer
- René Taupin (1905–1981), French translator, critic, and academic

== See also ==
- Toupin, surname
