= Phil Hergesheimer =

Canadian ice hockey player

- Born: July 9, 1914 Winnipeg, Manitoba, Canada
- Died: March 6, 2004 (aged 89) Kelowna, British Columbia, Canada
- Height: 5 ft 10 in (178 cm)
- Weight: 175 lb (79 kg; 12 st 7 lb)
- Position: Right wing
- Shot: Right
- Played for: Chicago Black Hawks; Boston Bruins
- Playing career: 1934–1951

Philip "Nip" Hergesheimer (July 9, 1914 — March 6, 2004) was a Canadian professional ice hockey right winger who played in the National Hockey League (NHL) with the Chicago Black Hawks and Boston Bruins between 1939 and 1942. A native of Winnipeg, Manitoba, Hergesheimer was the brother of fellow NHL player Wally Hergesheimer. The rest of Phil's career, which lasted between 1934 and 1955, was spent in various minor leagues.

== Playing career ==
Among the minor league teams he played for were the Winnipeg Falcons, Boston Cubs, London Tecumsehs, Minneapolis Millers, Cleveland Barons, Ottawa Commandos, St. John's Navy, Philadelphia Rockets, (also Head Coach), Cincinnati Mohawks, Kelowna Packers, and Kamloop Elks. He played four seasons with the Chicago Black Hawks of the NHL.

Hergesheimer was a five-star American Hockey League All-Star Game Champion, and the winner of the Calder Cup Trophy in 1946. By 1951 his career had totaled 288 goals and 265 assists for 553 points in 548 games. He retired in 1955 as the second-leading goal scorer of his era, and today still ranks 20th on the league's all-time list. On March 6, 2004, Hergesheimer died in Kelowna, British Columbia, shortly before he was inducted into the Cincinnati Hockey Hall of Fame. He was pre-deceased by his wife of 66 years, Mary.

== Career statistics ==
=== Regular season and playoffs ===
| | | | Regular season | | | | | Playoffs |
| Season | Team | League | GP | G | A | Pts | PIM | GP | G | A | Pts | PIM |
|---|---|---|---|---|---|---|---|---|---|---|---|---|
| 1932–33 | Winnipeg Falcons | WDJHL | 8 | 8 | 2 | 10 | 6 | — | — | — | — | — |
| 1933–34 | Winnipeg Falcons | MJHL | 14 | 9 | 6 | 15 | 21 | 1 | 0 | 0 | 0 | 0 |
| 1934–35 | Boston Tiger Cubs | Can-Am | 46 | 10 | 6 | 16 | 16 | 3 | 1 | 0 | 1 | 2 |
| 1935–36 | Boston Cubs | Can-Am | 27 | 2 | 7 | 9 | 10 | — | — | — | — | — |
| 1935–36 | Detroit Olympics | IHL | 5 | 1 | 1 | 2 | 0 | — | — | — | — | — |
| 1935–36 | London Tecumsehs | IHL | 11 | 2 | 2 | 4 | 0 | 2 | 0 | 0 | 0 | 0 |
| 1936–37 | Minneapolis Millers | AHA | 48 | 23 | 26 | 49 | 22 | 6 | 1 | 4 | 5 | 4 |
| 1937–38 | Cleveland Barons | IAHL | 47 | 25 | 20 | 45 | 13 | 2 | 2 | 1 | 3 | 0 |
| 1938–39 | Cleveland Barons | IAHL | 54 | 34 | 19 | 53 | 23 | 9 | 7 | 1 | 8 | 14 |
| 1939–40 | Chicago Black Hawks | NHL | 42 | 9 | 11 | 20 | 6 | 1 | 0 | 0 | 0 | 0 |
| 1940–41 | Chicago Black Hawks | NHL | 48 | 8 | 16 | 24 | 9 | 5 | 0 | 0 | 0 | 2 |
| 1941–42 | Chicago Black Hawks | NHL | 23 | 3 | 11 | 14 | 2 | — | — | — | — | — |
| 1941–42 | Boston Bruins | NHL | 3 | 0 | 0 | 0 | 12 | — | — | — | — | — |
| 1941–42 | Hershey Bears | AHL | 12 | 8 | 7 | 15 | 2 | 10 | 6 | 5 | 11 | 4 |
| 1942–43 | Chicago Black Hawks | NHL | 9 | 1 | 3 | 4 | 0 | — | — | — | — | — |
| 1942–43 | Cleveland Barons | AHL | 36 | 14 | 27 | 41 | 4 | 4 | 1 | 1 | 2 | 2 |
| 1943–44 | Cleveland Barons | AHL | 33 | 21 | 19 | 40 | 6 | — | — | — | — | — |
| 1943–44 | Ottawa Commandos | QSHL | 1 | 0 | 2 | 2 | 0 | 1 | 0 | 0 | 0 | 2 |
| 1944–45 | St. John's Navy | NFLD Sr | 6 | 11 | 15 | 26 | 0 | 1 | 3 | 2 | 5 | 0 |
| 1945–46 | Cleveland Barons | AHL | 54 | 21 | 27 | 48 | 4 | 12 | 6 | 10 | 16 | 4 |
| 1946–47 | Philadelphia Rockets | AHL | 64 | 48 | 44 | 92 | 20 | — | — | — | — | — |
| 1947–48 | Philadelphia Rockets | AHL | 57 | 42 | 31 | 73 | 6 | — | — | — | — | — |
| 1948–49 | Philadelphia Rockets | AHL | 67 | 38 | 28 | 66 | 14 | — | — | — | — | — |
| 1949–50 | Cincinnati Mohawks | AHL | 70 | 31 | 30 | 61 | 7 | — | — | — | — | — |
| 1950–51 | Cincinnati Mohawks | AHL | 54 | 6 | 13 | 19 | 8 | — | — | — | — | — |
| 1951–52 | Kelowna Packers | OSHL | 45 | 34 | 14 | 48 | 34 | — | — | — | — | — |
| 1952–53 | Kelowna Packers | OSHL | 54 | 20 | 26 | 46 | 10 | 4 | 2 | 2 | 4 | 2 |
| 1953–54 | Kelowna Packers | OSHL | 63 | 17 | 21 | 38 | 56 | 8 | 2 | 4 | 6 | 8 |
| 1954–55 | Kamloops Elks | OSHL | 40 | 10 | 8 | 18 | 18 | 9 | 2 | 0 | 2 | 2 |
| IAHL/AHL totals | | | 548 | 288 | 265 | 553 | 108 | 37 | 22 | 18 | 40 | 24 |
| NHL totals | | | 125 | 21 | 41 | 62 | 29 | 6 | 0 | 0 | 0 | 2 |

== Awards and achievements ==
- AHA Second All-Star Team (1937)
- IAHL First All-Star Team (1939)
- Calder Cup Championship (1939)
- AHL First All-Star Team (1944 & 1947)
- AHL Scoring Championship (1947)
- AHL Second All-Star Team (1948 & 1949)
- Honoured Member of the Manitoba Hockey Hall of Fame
