= Wally Hergesheimer =

Canadian ice hockey player

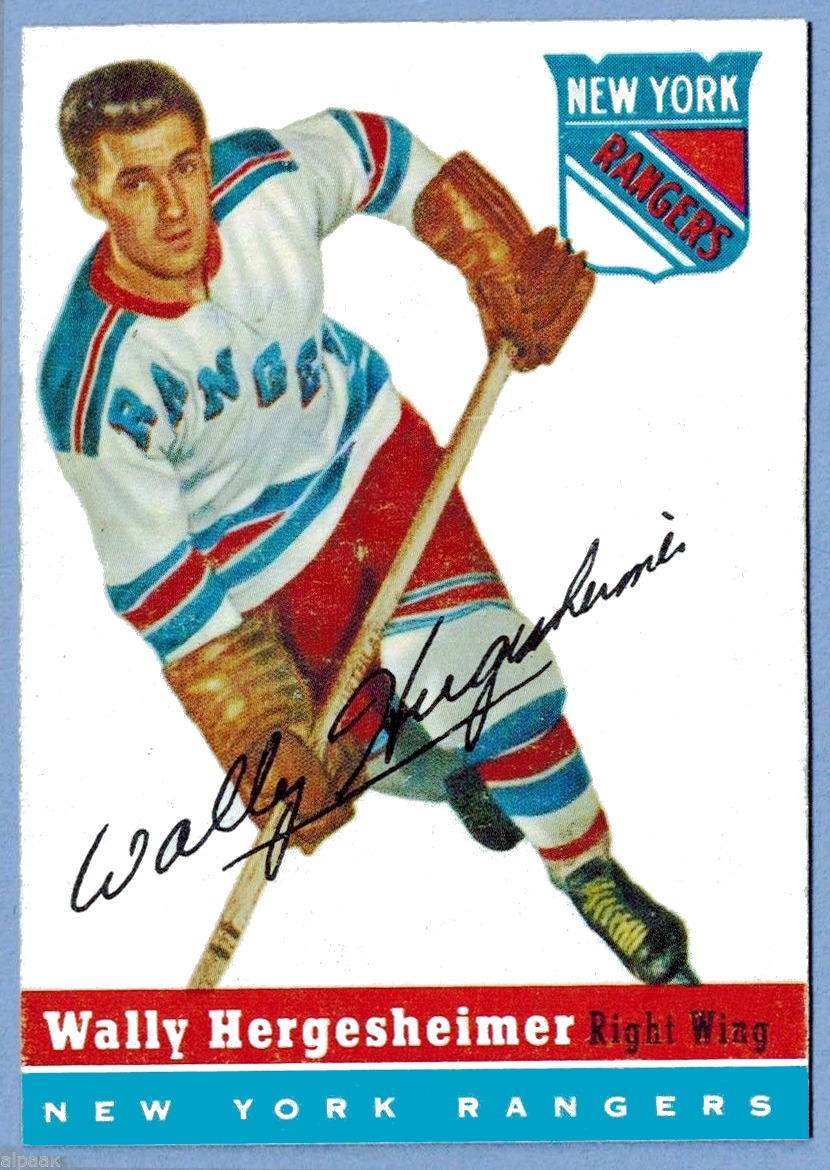
- Born: January 8, 1927 Winnipeg, Manitoba, Canada
- Died: September 27, 2014 (aged 87) Winnipeg, Manitoba, Canada
- Height: 5 ft 8 in (173 cm)
- Weight: 155 lb (70 kg; 11 st 1 lb)
- Position: Right wing
- Shot: Right
- Played for: New York Rangers; Chicago Black Hawks
- Playing career: 1947–1962

Walter Edgar Hergesheimer (January 8, 1927 —September 27, 2014) was a Canadian ice hockey forward.

== Playing career ==
In 1944 Hergsheimer lost the index and middle finger on his right hand due to an industrial accident.

Hergesheimer started his National Hockey League career with the New York Rangers. He would also play with the Chicago Black Hawks. His career lasted from 1952 to 1959. His older brother was Phil Hergesheimer (1914–2004), also a professional hockey player. He died of congestive heart failure at St. Boniface Hospital in Winnipeg on September 27, 2014, at the age of 87.

== Career statistics ==
=== Regular season and playoffs ===
			Regular season					Playoffs
Season	Team	League	GP	G	A	Pts	PIM	GP	G	A	Pts	PIM
1947–48	Minneapolis Millers	USHL	37	8	14	22	4	4	0	0	0	0
1948–49	San Francisco Shamrocks	PCHL	70	34	39	73	22	—	—	—	—	—
1949–50	Minneapolis Millers	USHL	69	43	37	80	22	7	5	5	10	0
1950–51	Cleveland Barons	AHL	71	42	41	83	8	11	11	2	13	2
1951–52	New York Rangers	NHL	68	26	12	38	6	—	—	—	—	—
1952–53	New York Rangers	NHL	70	30	29	59	10	—	—	—	—	—
1953–54	New York Rangers	NHL	66	27	16	43	42	—	—	—	—	—
1954–55	New York Rangers	NHL	14	4	2	6	4	—	—	—	—	—
1955–56	New York Rangers	NHL	70	22	18	40	26	5	1	0	1	0
1956–57	Chicago Black Hawks	NHL	41	2	8	10	12	—	—	—	—	—
1957–58	Buffalo Bisons	AHL	70	26	21	47	18	—	—	—	—	—
1958–59	New York Rangers	NHL	22	3	0	3	6	—	—	—	—	—
1958–59	Buffalo Bisons	AHL	45	23	23	46	21	11	2	1	3	6
1959–60	Buffalo Bisons	AHL	72	25	29	54	13	—	—	—	—	—
1960–61	Calgary Stampeders	WHL	70	40	26	66	17	5	3	0	3	0
1961–62	Los Angeles Blades	WHL	66	21	44	65	6	—	—	—	—	—
NHL totals			351	114	85	199	106	5	1	0	1	0

== Awards and achievements ==
- USHL First All-Star Team (1950)
- AHL Second All-Star Team (1951)
- Dudley "Red" Garrett Memorial Award (Rookie of the Year — AHL) (1951)
- Played in NHL All-Star Game (1953 & 1956)
- Honoured Member of the Manitoba Hockey Hall of Fame
- Honoured Member of the Manitoba Sports Hall of Fame and Museum
- In the 2009 book 100 Ranger Greats, was ranked No. 92 all-time of the 901 New York Rangers who had played during the team's first 82 seasons
