= Philadelphia Rockets =

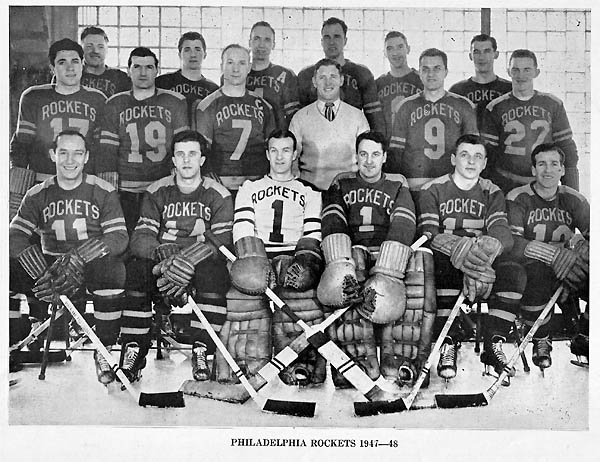
- City: Philadelphia, Pennsylvania
- League: American Hockey League
- Operated: 1946–1949
- Home arena: Philadelphia Arena

Franchise history
- 1930–1942: Atlantic City Seagulls
- 1942–1946: Philadelphia Falcons
- 1946–1949: Philadelphia Rockets

The Philadelphia Rockets were a minor professional ice hockey team based in the Philadelphia Arena in Philadelphia, Pennsylvania.

== History ==
In February 1946, Leonard Peto, owner of the former-Montreal Maroons NHL franchise, announced plans to revive the franchise in Philadelphia for the 1946-1947 NHL season as the league's seventh team. Peto and his partners identified the Phillies' former ballpark site at Broad and Huntingdon for their planned 20,000 uptown arena. Philadelphia Arena owner Pete Tyrell protested that the American Hockey League held territorial rights to Philadelphia, and planned himself to build a larger arena for ice hockey in Philadelphia. Peto's bid would prove unsuccessful, and Tyrell would not build a larger arena, but the AHL responded to the threat of an NHL franchise by admitting the Philadelphia Ramblers for the 1946-1947 season.

The Rockets played for three seasons in the AHL from 1946 to 1949. Philadelphia had previously had a team in the league during the 1941–42 AHL season known as the Philadelphia Ramblers. When the Ramblers had folded in 1942, they were replaced at the Philadelphia Arena by the Philadelphia Falcons who played in the Eastern Hockey League.

In 1946, the Falcons were replaced by the second Rockets team in the AHL. Four members of the Falcons (Vic Lofvendahl, Harvey Jacklin, Clayton Lavell, George DeFilice), made the jump to the higher league.

The Rockets had a farm team affiliation with Galt Rockets in the junior ice hockey division of the Ontario Hockey Association from 1947 to 1949.

== Season-by-season results ==
- Philadelphia Falcons 1942–1946 (Eastern Hockey League)
- Philadelphia Rockets 1946–1949 (American Hockey League)

Season	Games	Won	Lost	Tied	Points	Goals for	Goals against	Standing	Playoffs
1942–43	46	17	27	2	36	167	195	5th, EHL	Data unavailable
1943–44	45	17	23	5	39	—-	—-	3rd, EHL	Data unavailable
1944–45	48	23	21	4	50	—-	—-	3rd, EHL	Data unavailable
1945–46	52	26	21	5	57	180	186	2nd, EHL	Data unavailable
1946–47	64	5	52	7	17	188	400	5th, East	Out of Playoffs
1947–48	68	22	41	5	49	260	331	4th, East	Out of Playoffs
1948–49	68	15	48	5	35	230	407	5th, East	Out of Playoffs
