= Syracuse Stars (ice hockey) =

- City: Syracuse, New York
- League: IHL (1930–36); IAHL (1936–40)
- Operated: 1930–1940
- Home arena: New York State Fair Coliseum
- Colors: Red, white, blue
- Affiliates: Toronto Maple Leafs; New York Americans

Franchise history
- 1926–1930: Hamilton Tigers
- 1930–1940: Syracuse Stars
- 1940–1970: Buffalo Bisons

Championships
- Division titles: 2: 1935–36, 1936–37
- Calder Cups: 1: 1936–37

The Syracuse Stars were a minor professional ice hockey team from Syracuse, New York, for ten seasons from 1930–31 to 1939–40. The Stars name had previously been used by sports teams, including several Syracuse Stars baseball teams from the 19th century. The team played at the New York State Fair Coliseum on the New York State Fairgrounds. The Stars were affiliated with the Toronto Maple Leafs and the New York Americans.

== History ==
In 1930, the Hamilton Tigers International Hockey League (IHL) franchise was purchased by Percy LeSueur and partners and transferred to Syracuse to become the Syracuse Stars. LeSueur also managed the Syracuse Arena and coached the Stars team for part of the first season before giving way to Frank Foyston. The Stars hockey team played their first six seasons in the IHL from 1930 to 1936, and then in the International-American Hockey League from 1936 to 1940. The Stars were an affiliate of the Toronto Maple Leafs for the 1932–33 season and then from 1934 until 1939. The Stars had a one-season affiliation with the New York Americans in 1933–34.

The first five seasons for the Stars did not produce any championships. However, they won the IHL's regular season East Division in 1935–36 during their sixth season.

During the 1936–37 season in the IAHL, Syracuse won the F. G. "Teddy" Oke Trophy as West Division champions, and became the first ever Calder Cup champions after beating the Philadelphia Ramblers in the finals. The Stars reached the Calder Cup finals the following season, losing to the Providence Reds.

After four seasons in the IAHL, the team was acquired in 1940 by Louis Jacobs, owner of Jacob's Concessions, and relocated to Buffalo, New York to play as the Buffalo Bisons, where they played in the newly built Buffalo Memorial Auditorium. They played in Buffalo until 1970 when the National Hockey League expanded to Buffalo and created the Buffalo Sabres.

== AHL in Syracuse ==
Other AHL teams such as the Syracuse Warriors, Syracuse Eagles and Syracuse Firebirds would call Syracuse home after the Stars. The city has been home to the AHL's Syracuse Crunch since 1994. A banner memorializing the Stars inaugural AHL Calder Cup championship hung in the rafters of the Upstate Medical University Arena until 2018. The Syracuse Crunch wore replica Stars jerseys in 2011 to honor the AHL's 75th anniversary in a game versus the Lake Erie Monsters.

== Season-by-season results ==
- Syracuse Stars 1930–1936 (International Hockey League)
- Syracuse Stars 1936–1940 (International-American Hockey League)

=== Regular season ===
Season	Games	Won	Lost	Tied	Points	Goals for	Goals against	Standing
1930–31	48	9	34	5	23	114	171	7th, IHL
1931–32	48	16	23	9	41	111	118	6th, IHL
1932–33	44	23	15	6	52	136	119	3rd, IHL
1933–34	44	19	21	4	42	114	120	4th, IHL
1934–35	44	20	20	4	40	128	118	3rd, IHL
1935–36	48	26	19	3	55	167	130	1st, East
1936–37	48	27	16	5	59	173	129	1st, West
1937–38	48	21	20	7	49	142	122	3rd, West
1938–39	54	26	19	9	61	152	117	2nd, West
1939–40	56	20	27	9	49	147	169	5th, West

=== Playoffs ===
Season	Quarterfinals /Prelims	Semifinals	Finals
1930–31	—	Did not qualify	
1931–32	Did not qualify		
1932–33	2nd place tie in double round-robin.		
1933–34	3rd place tie in double round-robin.		
1934–35	—	L, 0–2, Detroit	—
1935–36	L, 0–3, Detroit	—	—
1936–37	Bye	W, 3–2, Pittsburgh	W, 3–1, Philadelphia
1937–38	W, 2–0, Pittsburgh	W, 2–0, Cleveland	L, 1–3, Providence
1938–39	L, 1–2, Providence	—	—
1939–40	Did not qualify		

== See also ==
The name was most recently used by an AAA minor hockey organization based out of Syracuse, New York.

- www.syracusestars.net
