= Philadelphia Ramblers =

American minor-pro ice hockey team (1935–1941)

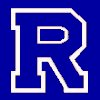
- City: Philadelphia, Pennsylvania
- League: American Hockey League
- Operated: 1935–1941
- Home arena: Philadelphia Arena
- Colors: Blue, white
- Affiliates: New York Rangers

Franchise history
- 1927–1935: Philadelphia Arrows
- 1935–1941: Philadelphia Ramblers
- 1941–1942: Philadelphia Rockets

Championships
- Regular season titles: 2 (1932–33, 1935–36)
- Division titles: 2 (1936–37, 1938–39)
- Playoff championships: 1 (1935–36)

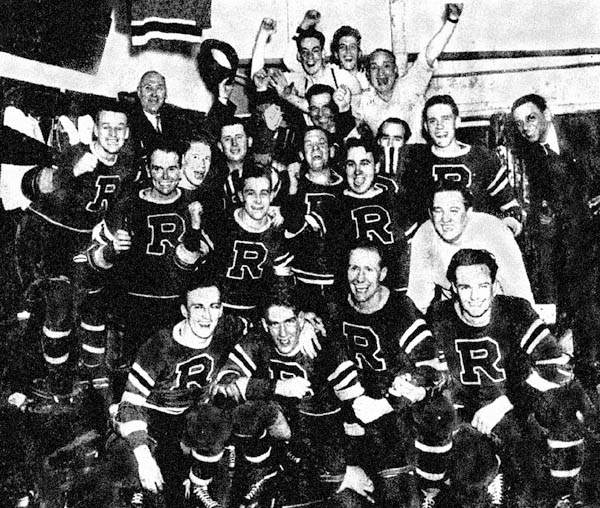
1938–39 Philadelphia Ramblers (I-AHL)

The Philadelphia Ramblers were a minor professional ice hockey team based in the Philadelphia Arena in Philadelphia, Pennsylvania. The Ramblers played for six seasons during the infancy of the American Hockey League from 1935 to 1941.

== History ==
The Ramblers were formerly known as the Philadelphia Arrows from 1927 to 1935 and played in the Canadian-American Hockey League. The team changed named to the Ramblers for the 1935–36 season. The Canadian American Hockey League merged into the International-American Hockey League in 1936, where the Ramblers competed for another four seasons, before that league became known as the modern-day American Hockey League.

From 1935 through 1941, the team was the primary minor league affiliate of the New York Rangers and many future and Ranger stars played for the Ramblers, such as 1936–37 Rambler Bryan Hextall, a future four-time NHL All-Star who scored the Rangers' Stanley Cup-winning goal in 1940. The Rangers ended the affiliation agreement after the 1940–41 season.

The team changed its name to the Philadelphia Rockets for the 1941–42 season, which turned out to be their final season.

== Season-by-season results ==
- Philadelphia Arrows 1927–1935 (Canadian-American Hockey League)
- Philadelphia Ramblers 1935–1936 (Canadian-American Hockey League)
- Philadelphia Ramblers 1936–1940 (International-American Hockey League)
- Philadelphia Ramblers 1940–1941 (American Hockey League)
- Philadelphia Rockets 1941–1942 (American Hockey League)

=== Regular season ===
Season	Games	Won	Lost	Tied	Points	Goals for	Goals against	Standing
1927–28	40	13	25	2	28	79	105	6th, CAHL
1928–29	40	12	21	7	31	60	73	6th, CAHL
1929–30	40	20	18	2	41	120	121	2nd, CAHL
1930–31	40	12	22	6	30	84	108	4th, CAHL
1931–32	40	13	22	5	31	85	114	5th, CAHL
1932–33	48	29	12	7	65	153	95	1st, CAHL
1933–34	40	17	15	8	42	121	101	3rd, CAHL
1934–35	48	15	30	3	33	122	160	5th, CAHL
1935–36	48	27	18	3	57	151	106	1st, CAHL
1936–37	48	26	14	8	60	149	106	1st, East
1937–38	48	26	18	4	56	134	108	2nd, East
1938–39	54	32	17	5	69	214	161	1st, East
1939–40	54	15	31	8	38	133	170	4th, East
1940–41	56	25	25	6	56	166	167	4th, East
1941–42	56	11	41	4	26	157	254	5th, East

=== Playoffs ===
Season	1st round	2nd round	Finals
1927–28	Out of playoffs		
1928–29	Out of playoffs		
1929–30	L, 0-2, Boston	–	–
1930–31	Out of playoffs		
1931–32	Out of playoffs		
1932–33	Bye	–	L, 2-3, Boston
1933–34	L, 0-2, Boston	–	–
1934–35	Out of playoffs		
1935–36	Bye	–	W, 3-1, Providence
1936–37	Bye	W, 2-0, Springfield	L, 1-3, Syracuse
1937–38	W, 2-0, New Haven	L, 2-1, Providence	–
1938–39	W, 3-2, Hershey	–	L, 1-3, Cleveland
1939–40	Out of playoffs		
1940–41	Out of playoffs		
1941–42	Out of playoffs		
