= 1939–40 AHL season =

- League: American Hockey League
- Sport: Ice hockey

Regular season
- F. G. "Teddy" Oke Trophy: Indianapolis Capitals

Playoffs
- Champions: Providence Reds
- Runners-up: Pittsburgh Hornets

AHL seasons
- 1938–39 1940–41

The 1939–40 AHL season was the fourth season of the International-American Hockey League, known in the present day as the American Hockey League. The league consisted of nine teams total. Four teams in the Eastern Division played a 54 game season, while five teams in the Western Division played a 56 game season. The Indianapolis Capitals won the F. G. "Teddy" Oke Trophy as the Western Division champions, while the Providence Reds won the Calder Cup as league champions.

== Team changes ==
- The Indianapolis Capitals joined the IAHL as an expansion team, based in Indianapolis, Indiana, playing in the West Division.

== Final standings ==
Notes: GP = Games played; W = Wins; L = Losses; T = Ties; GF = Goals for; GA = Goals against; Pts = Points;

East	GP	W	L	T	Pts	GF	GA
Providence Reds (CHI)	54	27	19	8	62	161	157
New Haven Eagles (MTL)	54	27	24	3	57	177	183
Springfield Indians (NYA)	54	24	24	6	54	166	149
Philadelphia Ramblers (NYR)	54	15	31	8	38	133	170

West	GP	W	L	T	Pts	GF	GA
Indianapolis Capitals (DET)	56	26	20	10	62	174	144
Hershey Bears (BOS)	56	27	24	5	59	154	156
Pittsburgh Hornets (TOR)	56	25	22	9	59	152	133
Cleveland Barons (independent)	56	24	24	8	56	127	130
Syracuse Stars (independent)	56	20	27	9	49	147	169

== Scoring leaders ==
Note: GP = Games played; G = Goals; A = Assists; Pts = Points; PIM = Penalty minutes

Player	Team	GP	G	A	Pts	PIM
Norm Locking	Syracuse Stars	55	31	32	63	12
Fred Thurier	Springfield Indians	54	28	32	60	27
Tony Hemmerling	New Haven Eagles	51	26	31	57	4
Max Bennett	Syracuse Stars	56	25	31	56	10
Ron Hudson	Indianapolis Capitals	54	27	27	54	19
George Patterson	New Haven Eagles	54	25	27	52	42
Eddie Convey	Syracuse Stars	53	17	33	50	24
Jack Toupin	Syracuse Stars	49	16	34	50	12
Marcel Tremblay	New Haven Eagles	51	23	24	47	13
Norman Schultz	Springfield Indians	54	21	25	46	6

== Calder Cup playoffs ==
Preliminary Round
E2	New Haven	1
W2	Hershey	2
E3	Springfield	1
W3	Pittsburgh	2

League Semi-Final
E1	Providence	3
W1	Indianapolis	2
W2	Hershey	1
W3	Pittsburgh	2

Calder Cup Final
E1	Providence	3
W3	Pittsburgh	0

== See also ==
- List of AHL seasons

Preceded by 1938–39 AHL season	AHL seasons	Succeeded by 1940–41 AHL season
