= 1936–37 AHL season =

- League: American Hockey League
- Sport: Ice hockey

Regular season
- F. G. "Teddy" Oke Trophy: Syracuse Stars

Playoffs
- Champions: Syracuse Stars
- Runners-up: Philadelphia Ramblers

AHL seasons
- 1937–38

The 1936–37 AHL season was the first season of the International-American Hockey League, known in the present day as the American Hockey League. The IAHL was formed when the International Hockey League and the Canadian-American Hockey League agreed to play an interlocking schedule after being cut down to only four teams each.

The IAHL was structured as a "circuit of mutual convenience" with eight teams in two divisions, scheduled to play a 48 game season. The IHL formed the West Division, and the CAHL served as the East Division. The Buffalo Bisons, whose home arena collapsed with nine days left in the 1935—36 season, were forced to suspend operations on December 6, 1936, due to financial woes.

Both leagues' championship trophies carried over to the new league to be awarded to division champions. The Henri Fontaine Cup, carried over from the CAHL to the new East Division, was awarded to the Philadelphia Ramblers as champions. The F. G. "Teddy" Oke Trophy, carried over from the IHL to the West Division, was awarded to the Syracuse Stars as champions. The Stars also won the inaugural Calder Cup by defeating the Philadelphia Ramblers for the championship.

== Final standings ==
Note: GP = Games played; W = Wins; L=Losses; T = Ties; GF = Goals for; GA = Goals against; Pts = Points;

East Division	GP	W	L	T	Pts	GF	GA
Philadelphia Ramblers (NYR)	48	26	14	8	60	149	106
Springfield Indians (independent)	48	22	17	9	53	117	125
Providence Reds (BOS)	48	21	20	7	49	122	125
New Haven Eagles (MTL/NYA)	48	14	28	6	34	107	142

West Division	GP	W	L	T	Pts	GF	GA
Syracuse Stars (TOR)	48	27	16	5	59	173	129
Pittsburgh Hornets (DET)	48	22	23	3	47	122	124
Cleveland Falcons (independent)	48	13	27	8	34	113	152
Buffalo Bisons^{†} (independent)	11	3	8	0	6	22	30

^{†}Suspended operations.

== Scoring Leaders ==
Note: GP = Games played; G = Goals; A = Assists; Pts = Points; PIM = Penalty minutes

Player	Team	GP	G	A	Pts	PIM
Jack Markle	Syracuse Stars	48	21	39	60	2
Clint Smith	Philadelphia Ramblers	47	25	29	54	15
Bryan Hextall	Philadelphia Ramblers	48	29	23	52	34
Eddie Convey	Syracuse Stars	48	12	37	49	82
Jackie Keating	Providence Reds	48	12	31	43	22
Lorne Duguid	Providence Reds	47	20	21	41	16
Norman Mann	Syracuse Stars	46	17	24	41	47
Charlie Mason	Philadelphia Ramblers	48	25	15	40	17
Bazel Doran	Syracuse Stars	48	24	15	39	42
Art Jackson	Syracuse Stars	29	17	21	38	38

== Calder Cup Playoffs ==
Preliminary Round
East Division
2	Springfield	2
3	Providence	1
West Division

Division Finals
1	Philadelphia	2
2	Springfield	0
1	Syracuse	3
2	Pittsburgh	2

Calder Cup Final
E1	Philadelphia	1
W1	Syracuse	3

== See also ==
- List of AHL seasons

Preceded by None	AHL seasons	Succeeded by 1937–38 AHL season
