= Providence Reds =

Former professional minor league ice hockey team in Providence, Rhode Island

- City: Providence, Rhode Island
- League: American Hockey League
- Operated: 1926–1977
- Home arena: Rhode Island Auditorium (1926–72); Providence Civic Center (1972–77)
- Colors: Red, black, white

Franchise history
- 1926–1976: Providence Reds
- 1976–1977: Rhode Island Reds
- 1977–1980: Binghamton Dusters
- 1980–1990: Binghamton Whalers
- 1990–1997: Binghamton Rangers
- 1997–2010: Hartford Wolf Pack
- 2010–2013: Connecticut Whale
- 2013–present: Hartford Wolf Pack

Championships
- Regular season titles: 9: 29–30, 31–32, 33–34, 39–40, 40–41, 48–49, 55–56, 56–57, 74–75
- Division titles: 13: 29–30, 31–32, 33–34, 37–48, 39–40, 40–41, 47–48, 48–49, 55–56, 56–57, 62–63, 70–71, 74–75
- Calder Cups: 4: 37–38, 39–40, 48–49, 55–56

The Providence Reds were a hockey team that played in the Canadian-American Hockey League (CAHL) between 1926 and 1936 and the American Hockey League (AHL) from 1936 to 1977, the last season of which they played as the Rhode Island Reds. The team won the Calder Cup in 1938, 1940, 1949, and 1956. The Reds played at the Rhode Island Auditorium, located on North Main Street in Providence, Rhode Island, from 1926 through 1972, when the team affiliated with the New York Rangers and moved into the newly built Providence Civic Center. The team name came from the breed of chicken known as the Rhode Island Red.

When the North American Hockey League folded in 1977, the owners of the NAHL's Broome Dusters acquired the Reds franchise and moved them to Binghamton, New York, where they were known as the Binghamton Dusters, Binghamton Whalers, and Binghamton Rangers. In 1997 the franchise was sold to Madison Square Garden and then moved to Hartford, Connecticut to become the Hartford Wolf Pack. On November 27, 2010, they were renamed the Connecticut Whale to honor the NHL's Hartford Whalers; but changed their name back to the Wolf Pack in 2013. It is the oldest continuously operating minor-league hockey franchise in North America, having fielded a team in one form or another since 1926 in the CAHL. Among all professional hockey franchises in North America, only the NHL's Montreal Canadiens, Toronto Maple Leafs and Boston Bruins are older. is also the only AHL franchise to have never missed a season since the league began as a "circuit of mutual convenience" between the CAHL and first International Hockey League in 1936.

The AHL returned to Providence in 1992 in the form of the Providence Bruins. Formed in 2001, The Rhode Island Reds Heritage Society commemorates the existence of the Reds franchise and keeps the memory alive. Their pinnacle event is an annual reunion that takes place during the first weekend in August.

== Coaches ==
- Jimmy Gardner (1926–29)
- Sprague Cleghorn (1929–31)
- Billy Coutu (1933–34)
- Albert "Battleship" Leduc (1936–37)
- Frederick "Bun" Cook (1938–39, 1940–43)
- Johnny Mitchell (1943–44)
- Irwin Boyd (1944–46)
- Terry Reardon (1947–53)
- Pat Egan (1953–55)
- Jack Crawford (1955–60)
- Phil Watson (1960–61)
- Fern Flaman (1961–65)
- Ivan Irwin (1965–66)
- Dave Creighton (1969–70)
- Larry Wilson (1971–72)
- Larry Popein (1972–73)
- John Muckler (1973–76)

== Season-by-season results ==
- Providence Reds 1926–1936 (Canadian-American Hockey League)
- Providence Reds 1936–1976 ((International-)American Hockey League)
- Rhode Island Reds 1976–1977 (American Hockey League)

=== Regular season ===
Season	Games	Won	Lost	Tied	Points	Goals for	Goals against	Standing
1926–27	32	12	17	3	27	50	67	4th, C-AHL
1927–28	40	13	19	8	34	88	83	5th, C-AHL
1928–29	40	18	12	10	46	64	58	2nd, C-AHL
1929–30	40	24	11	5	53	120	98	1st, C-AHL
1930–31	40	23	11	6	52	132	96	2nd, C-AHL
1931–32	40	23	11	6	52	138	108	1st, C-AHL
1932–33	48	26	16	6	58	129	117	2nd, C-AHL
1933–34	40	19	12	9	47	91	92	1st, C-AHL
1934–35	48	19	17	12	50	124	144	3rd, C-AHL
1935–36	47	21	20	6	48	106	127	2nd, C-AHL
1936–37	48	21	20	7	49	122	125	3rd, East
1937–38	48	25	16	7	57	114	86	1st, East
1938–39	54	21	22	11	53	136	153	2nd, East
1939–40	54	27	19	8	62	161	157	1st, East
1940–41	56	31	21	4	66	196	171	1st, East
1941–42	56	17	32	7	41	205	237	4th, East
1942–43	56	27	27	2	56	211	216	2nd, East
1943–44	52	11	36	5	27	126	214	3rd, East
1944–45	60	23	6	31	52	241	249	3rd, East
1945–46	62	23	33	6	52	221	254	3rd, East
1946–47	64	21	33	10	52	226	281	4th, East
1947–48	68	41	23	4	86	342	277	1st, East
1948–49	68	44	18	6	94	347	219	1st, East
1949–50	70	34	33	3	71	268	267	2nd, East
1950–51	70	24	41	5	53	247	303	4th, East
1951–52	68	32	33	3	67	263	270	2nd, East
1952–53	64	27	36	1	55	215	254	5th, AHL
1953–54	70	26	40	4	56	211	276	5th, AHL
1954–55	64	21	37	6	48	194	263	6th, AHL
1955–56	64	45	17	2	92	263	193	1st, AHL
1956–57	64	34	22	8	76	236	168	1st, AHL
1957–58	70	33	32	5	71	237	220	3rd, AHL
1958–59	70	28	40	2	58	222	265	6th, AHL
1959–60	72	38	32	2	78	251	237	3rd, AHL
1960–61	72	26	46	0	52	225	333	7th, AHL
1961–62	70	36	32	2	74	261	267	3rd, East
1962–63	72	38	29	5	81	239	203	1st, East
1963–64	72	32	35	5	69	248	239	3rd, East
1964–65	72	20	50	2	42	193	312	5th, East
1965–66	72	20	49	3	43	184	310	5th, East
1966–67	72	13	46	13	39	210	329	5th, East
1967–68	72	30	33	9	69	235	272	3rd, East
1968–69	74	32	36	6	70	242	284	3rd, East
1969–70	72	23	36	13	59	218	267	4th, East
1970–71	72	28	31	13	69	257	270	1st, East
1971–72	76	28	37	11	67	250	274	4th, East
1972–73	76	32	30	14	78	253	255	4th, East
1973–74	76	38	26	12	88	330	244	2nd, North
1974–75	76	43	21	12	98	317	263	1st, North
1975–76	76	34	34	8	76	294	300	3rd, North
1976–77	80	25	51	4	54	282	359	6th, AHL

=== Playoffs ===
Season	1st round	2nd round	Finals
1926–27	Out of Playoffs		
1927–28	Out of Playoffs		
1928–29	W, (4-3GD) New Haven	—	L, Boston, 0-2-2
1929–30	bye	—	W, Boston, 3-0
1930–31	L, (7-6GD), Boston	—	
1931–32	W, (5-2GD) Bronx	—	W, Boston, 3-0
1932–33	L, (7-4GD) Boston	—	
1933–34	bye	—	W, Boston, 3-0-0
1934–35	W, Quebec, 3-0	—	L, Boston, 3-0
1935–36	W, Springfield 2-1	—	L, Philadelphia, 3-1
1936–37	L, 1-2, Springfield	—	
1937–38	Bye	W, 2-1, Philadelphia	W, 3-1, Syracuse
1938–39	W, 2-1 Syracuse	L, 2-0 Cleveland	
1939–40	W, 3-2 Indianapolis	bye	W, 3-0, Pittsburgh
1940–41	L, 1-3, Cleveland	—	—
1941–42	Out of playoffs		
1942–43	L, 0-2, Cleveland	—	—
1943–44	Out of playoffs		
1944–45	Out of playoffs		
1945–46	L, 0-2, Cleveland	—	—
1946–47	Out of playoffs		
1947–48	L, 1-4, Cleveland	—	—
1948–49	W, 4-3, St. Louis	bye	W, 4-3, Hershey
1949–50	W, 2-0, Springfield	L, 0-2, Indianapolis	—
1950–51	Out of playoffs		
1951–52	W, 3-2, Cleveland	W, 3-1, Cincinnati	L, 2-4, Pittsburgh
1952–53	Out of playoffs		
1953–54	Out of playoffs		
1954–55	Out of playoffs		
1955–56	W, 3-2, Buffalo	—	W, 4-0, Cleveland
1956–57	L, 1-4, Rochester	—	—
1957–58	L, 1-4, Hershey	—	—
1958–59	Out of playoffs		
1959–60	L, 1-4, Springfield	—	—
1960–61	Out of playoffs		
1961–62	L, 1-2, Hershey	—	—
1962–63	L, 2-4, Buffalo	—	—
1963–64	L, 1-2, Hershey	—	—
1964–65	Out of playoffs		
1965–66	Out of playoffs		
1966–67	Out of playoffs		
1967–68	W, 3-1, Springfield	L, 1-3, Quebec	—
1968–69	W, 3-1, Baltimore	L, 2-3, Quebec	—
1969–70	Out of playoffs		
1970–71	W, 4-2, Baltimore	bye	L, 0-4, Springfield
1971–72	L, 1-4, Boston	—	—
1972–73	L, 0-4, Nova Scotia	—	—
1973–74	W, 4-2, Nova Scotia	W, 4-0, New Haven	L, 1-4, Hershey
1974–75	L, 2-4, Springfield	—	—
1975–76	L, 0-3, Rochester	—	—
1976–77	Out of playoffs		

== Affiliations ==
Per HockeyDB:

- Boston Bruins (1936–1938, 1958–1962, 1963–1969)
- California Seals (1969–1971)
- Chicago Black Hawks (1939–1941)
- Colorado Rockies (1976–77)
- New England Whalers (1976–77)
- New York Rangers (1955–1958, 1971–1976)
- St. Louis Blues (1968–69, 1975–76)
- Toronto Maple Leafs (1942–43)
