= 1938–39 AHL season =

- League: American Hockey League
- Sport: Ice hockey

Regular season
- F. G. "Teddy" Oke Trophy: Hershey Bears

Playoffs
- Champions: Cleveland Barons
- Runners-up: Philadelphia Ramblers

AHL seasons
- 1937–38 1939–40

The 1938–39 AHL season was the third season of the International-American Hockey League, known in the present day as the American Hockey League. It was also the first season that the I-AHL played as a fully unified league. For the previous two seasons, the International Hockey League and Canadian-American Hockey League had played as a "circuit of mutual convenience" with an interlocking schedule. However, on June 29, 1938, the IHL and C-AHL formally merged into a single circuit under the I-AHL name.

Eight teams played 54 games each in the schedule. The Hershey Bears won the F. G. "Teddy" Oke Trophy as the Western Division champions, while the Cleveland Barons won the Calder Cup as league champions.

== Team changes ==
- One of the I-AHL's first acts as a fully merged league was to grant an expansion franchise to the Hershey Bears, based in Hershey, Pennsylvania. The Bears transferred from the Eastern Amateur Hockey League to the I-AHL's West Division. The Bears have been in the I-AHL/AHL ever since, without relocating or renaming. As of the end of the 2016–17 season, they are the oldest team in the league, and the seventh oldest team in all of professional hockey (behind only the NHL's Original Six) still playing in its current city and under its current name.

== Final standings ==
Notes: GP = Games played; W = Wins; L = Losses; T = Ties; GP = Goals for; GA = Goals against; Pts = Points;

East	GP	W	L	T	Pts	GF	GA
Philadelphia Ramblers (NYR)	54	32	17	5	69	214	161
Providence Reds (independent)	54	21	22	11	53	136	153
Springfield Indians (independent)	54	16	29	9	41	121	179
New Haven Eagles (MTL)	54	14	30	10	38	114	174

West	GP	W	L	T	Pts	GF	GA
Hershey Bears (BOS)	54	31	18	5	67	140	110
Syracuse Stars (TOR)	54	26	19	9	61	152	117
Cleveland Barons (independent)	54	23	22	9	55	145	138
Pittsburgh Hornets (DET)	54	22	28	4	46	176	166

== Scoring leaders ==
Note: GP = Games played; G = Goals; A = Assists; Pts = Points; PIM = Penalty minutes

Player	Team	GP	G	A	Pts	PIM
Don Deacon	Pittsburgh Hornets	46	24	41	65	41
Bill Carse	Philadelphia Ramblers	54	24	33	57	22
James MacDonald	Philadelphia Ramblers	49	18	37	55	48
Murray Armstrong	Syracuse Stars	50	27	27	54	10
Joe Krol	Philadelphia Ramblers	54	24	30	54	34
Phil Hergesheimer	Cleveland Barons	54	34	19	53	23
Lorne Duguid	Cleveland/Pittsburgh	54	19	32	51	23
Norm Locking	Syracuse Stars	53	20	30	50	28
Bobby Kirk	Philadelphia Ramblers	49	14	36	50	12
Cliff Barton	Philadelphia Ramblers	52	21	28	49	16

== Calder Cup playoffs ==
Preliminary Round
E2	Providence	2
W2	Syracuse	1
E3	Springfield	1
W3	Cleveland	2

League Semi-Final
E1	Philadelphia	3
W1	Hershey	2
E2	Providence	0
W3	Cleveland	2

Calder Cup Final
E1	Philadelphia	1
W3	Cleveland	3

== See also ==
- List of AHL seasons

Preceded by 1937–38 AHL season	AHL seasons	Succeeded by 1939–40 AHL season
