= 1937–38 AHL season =

- League: American Hockey League
- Sport: Ice hockey

Regular season
- F. G. "Teddy" Oke Trophy: Cleveland Barons

Playoffs
- Champions: Providence Reds
- Runners-up: Syracuse Stars

AHL seasons
- 1936–37 1938–39

The 1937–38 AHL season was the second season of the International-American Hockey League, known in the present day as the American Hockey League. It was the second season in which the International Hockey League and Canadian-American Hockey League played an interlocking schedule as a "circuit of mutual convenience" with an interlocking schedule. Teams played a 48 game season, with the IHL serving as the West Division and the C-AHL serving as the East Division. The Cleveland Barons won the F. G. "Teddy" Oke Trophy as the Western Division champions, while the Providence Reds won the Calder Cup as league champions.

After the season, the IHL and C-AHL formerly merged into a unified league under the I-AHL name.

== Team changes ==
- The Cleveland Falcons are renamed the Cleveland Barons.

== Final standings ==
Notes: GP = Games played; W = Wins; L = Losses; T = Ties; GF = Goals for; GA = Goals against; Pts = Points;

East Division	GP	W	L	T	Pts	GF	GA
Providence Reds (BOS)	48	25	16	7	57	114	86
Philadelphia Ramblers (NYR)	48	26	18	4	56	134	108
New Haven Eagles (MTL)	48	13	28	7	33	93	131
Springfield Indians (independent)	48	10	30	8	28	96	140

West Division	GP	W	L	T	Pts	GF	GA
Cleveland Barons (independent)	48	25	12	11	61	126	114
Pittsburgh Hornets (DET)	48	22	18	8	52	100	104
Syracuse Stars (TOR)	48	21	20	7	49	142	122

== Scoring leaders ==
Note: GP = Games played; G = Goals; A = Assists; Pts = Points; PIM = Penalty minutes

Player	Team	GP	G	A	Pts	PIM
Jack Markle	Syracuse Stars	48	22	32	54	8
Eddie Convey	Syracuse Stars	48	19	33	52	42
Lorne Duguid	Cleveland Barons	47	22	27	49	22
Les Cunningham	Cleveland Barons	48	19	28	47	55
Phil Hergesheimer	Cleveland Barons	47	25	20	45	13
Charlie Mason	Philadelphia Ramblers	45	24	20	44	11
Bill Carse	Philadelphia Ramblers	48	15	25	40	46
Alex Cook	Cleveland Barons	43	13	27	40	46
Oscar Asmundson	New Haven Eagles	44	13	26	39	57
Murray Armstrong	Syracuse Stars	35	7	31	38	10

== Calder Cup playoffs ==
Preliminary Round
East Division
2	Philadelphia	2
3	New Haven	0
West Division
2	Syracuse	2
3	Pittsburgh	0

Division Finals
1	Providence	2
2	Philadelphia	1
1	Cleveland	0
2	Syracuse	2

Calder Cup Final
E1	Providence	3
W2	Syracuse	1

== See also ==
- List of AHL seasons

Preceded by 1936–37 AHL season	AHL seasons	Succeeded by 1938–39 AHL season
