= 1940–41 AHL season =

- League: American Hockey League
- Sport: Ice hockey

Regular season
- F. G. "Teddy" Oke Trophy: Cleveland Barons

Playoffs
- Champions: Cleveland Barons
- Runners-up: Hershey Bears

AHL seasons
- 1939–40 1941–42

The 1940–41 AHL season was the fifth season of the American Hockey League, which had operated the previous four seasons as the "International-American Hockey League." Nine teams played 56 games each in the schedule.

The Cleveland Barons won their second F. G. "Teddy" Oke Trophy as the Western Division champions, and their second Calder Cup as league champions.

== Team changes ==
- The Syracuse Stars moved to Buffalo, New York, becoming the second incarnation of the Buffalo Bisons.

== Final standings ==
Notes: GP = Games played; W = Wins; L = Losses; T = Ties; GF = Goals for; GA = Goal against; Pts = Points;

East	GP	W	L	T	Pts	GF	GA
Providence Reds (CHI)	56	31	21	4	66	196	171
New Haven Eagles (MTL)	56	27	21	8	62	179	153
Springfield Indians (NYA)	56	26	21	9	61	157	149
Philadelphia Ramblers (NYR)	56	25	25	6	56	166	167

West	GP	W	L	T	Pts	GF	GA
Cleveland Barons (independent)	56	26	21	9	61	177	162
Hershey Bears (BOS)	56	24	23	9	57	193	189
Pittsburgh Hornets (independent)	56	21	29	6	48	156	170
Buffalo Bisons (independent)	56	19	27	10	48	148	176
Indianapolis Capitals (DET)	56	17	28	11	45	133	168

== Scoring leaders ==
Note: GP = Games played; G = Goals; A = Assists; Pts = Points; PIM = Penalty minutes

Player	Team	GP	G	A	Pts	PIM
Les Cunningham	Cleveland Barons	56	22	42	64	10
Fred Thurier	Springfield Indians	41	29	31	60	36
Glen Brydson	Springfield Indians	54	20	36	56	28
Ab DeMarco	Providence Reds	55	20	34	54	13
Wally Kilrea	Hershey Bears	55	17	37	54	0
Lloyd Roubell	Pittsburgh Hornets	53	22	31	53	14
George Patterson	New Haven Eagles	45	19	33	52	33
Lude Wareing	Philadelphia Ramblers	55	24	25	49	12
Bob Gracie	Buffalo Bisons	56	22	26	48	2
Herb Foster	Philadelphia Ramblers	53	24	22	46	18
Pat McReavy	Hershey Bears	51	21	25	46	2

- complete list

== Calder Cup playoffs ==
Preliminary Round
E2	New Haven	0
W2	Hershey	2
E3	Springfield	1
W3	Pittsburgh	2

League Semi-Final
E1	Providence	1
W1	Cleveland	3
W2	Hershey	2
W3	Pittsburgh	1

Calder Cup Final
W1	Cleveland	3
W2	Hershey	2

== See also ==
- List of AHL seasons

Preceded by 1939–40 AHL season	AHL seasons	Succeeded by 1941–42 AHL season
