= 1975 WHA playoffs =

WHA postseason tournament

Tournament details
- Dates: April 8 – May 12, 1975
- Season: 1974–75
- Teams: 8
- Defending champions: Houston Aeros

Final positions
- Champions: Houston Aeros (2nd title)
- Runners-up: Quebec Nordiques

Tournament statistics
- Scoring leader(s): Mark Howe (Aeros) (22 points)

Awards
- MVP: Ron Grahame (Aeros)

The 1975 WHA playoffs was the postseason tournament of the World Hockey Association's 1974–75 season. The tournament concluded with the Western Division champion Houston Aeros defeating the Eastern Division champion Quebec Nordiques in four games for their second straight Avco Cup championship.

== Playoff seeds ==
The top two teams in each of the three divisions (Western, Canadian, Eastern) made the playoffs, regardless of total points, which is how Cleveland reached the postseason with 73 points in a weak Eastern Division despite third place Winnipeg having 81 points in the Canadian Division. All eight clubs then were seeded 1–8 based on regular season points, regardless of conference or division.

1. Houston Aeros, Western Division champions – 106 points
2. Quebec Nordiques, Canadian Division champions – 92 points
3. New England Whalers, Eastern Division champions – 91 points
4. San Diego Mariners – 90 points
5. Toronto Toros– 88 points
6. Minnesota Fighting Saints– 87 points
7. Phoenix Roadrunners– 86 points
8. Cleveland Crusaders – 73 points

== Bracket ==
Quarterfinals
W1	Houston Aeros	4
E2	Cleveland Crusaders	1
W2	San Diego Mariners	4
C2	Toronto Toros	2
E1	New England Whalers	2
W3	Minnesota Fighting Saints	4
C1	Quebec Nordiques	4
W4	Phoenix Roadrunners	1

Semifinals
W1	Houston Aeros	4
W2	San Diego Mariners	0
W3	Minnesota Fighting Saints	2
C1	Quebec Nordiques	4

Finals
W1	Houston Aeros	4
C1	Quebec Nordiques	0

== Quarterfinals ==
=== (C1) Quebec Nordiques vs. (W4) Phoenix Roadrunners ===
Quebec had gone 4–2 against Phoenix in the regular season. It was Quebec who decided that their series would start one day before the other playoff games would start, a point that irked Roadrunner coach Sandy Hucul since the team had to travel the entire day before going from Phoenix to Quebec. A close first period in Game 2 turned quickly for Quebec, who scored four goals (all from at least 30 feet out) on eight shots in the second period to win 6–2 in a game that also saw Marc Tardif tie a WHA record for most assists in a period with three. Game 3 saw just two penalties called on each team in a 3-0 thumping by Quebec. Game 4 saw the Roadrunners score four goals in the first period, but Quebec responded with goals of their own that saw Bob Guindon tie the game with 15 seconds remaining in the second period before a scoreless third period saw overtime. After a save by Quebec goaltender Richard Brodeur saw the puck bounce to Michel Cormier, he lifted it over Brodeur to end the game. In Game 5, the two teams traded goals in the second period for a 2–2 tie, but Marc Tardif gave Quebec the go-ahead lead with less than six minutes remaining. Phoenix sent out their goaltender for an extra attacker late that saw Serge Bernier get the puck for Quebec and shoot it into the empty net to close the scoring as the series soon ended.

April 8	Phoenix Roadrunners	2–5 (0–2, 1–3, 1–0)	Quebec Nordiques	Colisée de Québec; Attendance: 10,105

Box score
Jack Norris	Goalies	Richard Brodeur
0:33 (2nd) - Robbie Ftorek; 3:58 (3rd) - Gene Sobchuk / Goals / 7:14 (1st) - Michel Parizeau; 17:37 (1st) - Rejean Houle; 5:11 (2nd) - Rejean Houle; 13:05 (2nd) - Rene LeClerc; 17:31 (2nd) - Rene LeClerc
10 8 21 - 39	Shots	10 8 6 - 24

April 10	Phoenix Roadrunners	2–6 (1–1, 0–4, 1–1)	Quebec Nordiques	Colisée de Québec; Attendance: 10,546

Box score
Jack Norris / Gary Kurt	Goalies	Richard Brodeur
2:59 (1st) - Jim Boyd; 16:45 (3rd) - Peter McNamee / Goals / 7:43 (1st) - Marc Tardif; 3:12 (2nd) - Bob Guindon; 9:49 (2nd) - Christian Bordeleau; 11:37 (2nd) - Serge Bernier; 16:46 (2nd) - Serge Bernier; 3:10 (3rd) - Rejean Houle
14 12 17 - 43	Shots	7 8 7 - 22

April 12	Quebec Nordiques	3–0 (1–0, 2–0, 0–0)	Phoenix Roadrunners	Arizona Veterans Memorial Coliseum; Attendance: 8,734

Box score
Richard Brodeur	Goalies	Gary Kurt
1:43 (1st) - Serge Bernier; 7:14 (2nd) - Marc Tardif; 11:30 (2nd) - Rejean Houle / Goals / No scoring
7 4 7 - 18	Shots	6 8 18 - 32

April 15	Quebec Nordiques	5–6 (OT) (2–4, 3–1, 0–0, 0–1)	Phoenix Roadrunners	Arizona Veterans Memorial Coliseum; Attendance: 6,033

Box score
Richard Brodeur	Goalies	Gary Kurt
5:25 (1st) - Serge Bernier; 14:57 (1st) - Rejean Houle; 2:22 (2nd) - Bob Guindon; 18:02 (2nd) - Serge Bernier; 19:45 (2nd) - Bob Guindon / Goals / 0:20 (1st) - Gene Sobchuk; 9:39 (1st) - Gene Sobchuk; 14:27 (1st) - John Gray; 19:34 (1st) - Robbie Ftorek; 9:11 (2nd) - Wendell Bennett; 7:21 (OT) - Michel Cormier
10 9 6 3 28	Shots	10 15 7 6 38

April 17	Phoenix Roadrunners	2–4 (0–0, 2–2, 0–2)	Quebec Nordiques	Colisée de Québec; Attendance: 10,600

Box score
Gary Kurt	Goalies	Richard Brodeur
1:15 (2nd) - John Gray; 8:47 (2nd) - Gene Sobchuk / Goals / 4:13 (2nd) - Rene LeClerc; 11:31 (2nd) - Jeannot Gilbert; 14:20 (3rd) - Marc Tardif; 19:26 (3rd) - Serge Bernier
14 15 10 - 39	Shots	8 11 13 - 32

=== (E1) New England Whalers vs. (W3) Minnesota Fighting Saints ===
Minnesota went 4–2 versus New England in the regular season. In Game 1, the Saints won 6–5 but ended up losing a player in the aftermath. In the early hours of April 11, Gord Gallant (who scored a goal in the first game) got into a fight with head coach Harry Neale over missing curfew that saw him kicked off the team, having given Neale enough injury to necessitate 10 stitches and a black eye. A brawl occurred in the early minutes of the second period that saw play held up for 32 minutes as 11 players received a combined total of 119 penalty minutes. The game went into overtime and Rick Ley (who received 19 minutes in penalties in the 2nd period brawl) scored the game-winning goal on a slap shot six minutes into overtime. The game lasted a total of three hours and 47 minutes.

April 9	Minnesota Fighting Saints	6–5 (2–3, 3–2, 1–1)	New England Whalers	Hartford Civic Center; Attendance: 9,722

Box score
John Garrett	Goalies	Al Smith
1:59 (1st) - Gord Gallant; 4:44 (1st) - Bill Butters; 4:25 (2nd) - Wayne Connelly; 11:22 (2nd) - Gary Gambucci; 14:02 (2nd) - Mike Walton; 11:55 (3rd) - Wayne Connelly / Goals / 7:46 (1st) - Ron Climie; 17:05 (1st) - Larry Pleau; 4:59 (2nd) - Larry Pleau; 19:52 (2nd) - Wayne Carleton; 19:24 (3rd) - John French
36 (13–15–8)	Shots	36 (13–13–10)

April 11	Minnesota Fighting Saints	2–3 (OT) (0–1, 1–1, 1–0, 0–1)	New England Whalers	Hartford Civic Center; Attendance: 10,507

Box score
John Garrett	Goalies	Al Smith
8:07 (2nd) - George Morrison; 4:53 (3rd) - Ron Busniuk / Goals / 17:28 (1st) - Wayne Carleton; 7:28 (2nd) - Brad Selwood; 6:46 (OT) – Rick Ley
32 (9–9–10–4)	Shots	34 (10–11–10–3)

April 13	New England Whalers	3–8 (0–3, 2–3, 1–2)	Minnesota Fighting Saints	St. Paul Civic Center; Attendance: 10,509

Box score
Al Smith	Goalies	John Garrett
14:53 (2nd) - Mike Byers; 16:02 (2nd) - Ron Climie; 9:02 (3rd) - Ron Climie / Goals / 7:03 (1st) - George Morrison; 13:22 (1st) - Fran Huck; 19:18 (1st) - Terry Ball; 2:31 (2nd) - Mike Walton; 11:36 (2nd) - George Morrison; 19:16 (2nd) - Terry Ball; 2:21 (3rd) - Rick Smith; 7:25 (3rd) - Ron Busniuk
28 (8–10–10)	Shots	31 (10–11–10)

April 15	New England Whalers	5–2 (0–1, 1–1, 4–0)	Minnesota Fighting Saints	St. Paul Civic Center; Attendance: 11,903

Box score
Al Smith	Goalies	John Garrett
5:56 (2nd) - Nick Fotiu; 4:14 (3rd) - Bob Charlebois; 8:17 (3rd) - Tommy Earl; 12:03 (3rd) - Nick Fotiu; 13:18 (3rd) - Don Blackburn / Goals / 12:56 (1st) - Gary Gambucci; 17:13 (2nd) - Wayne Connelly
28 (6–8–14)	Shots	33 (12–11–10)

April 18	Minnesota Fighting Saints	4–0 (0–0, 1–0, 3–0)	New England Whalers	Hartford Civic Center; Attendance: 10,507

Box score
John Garrett	Goalies	Al Smith
17:29 (2nd) - Fran Huck; 13:31 (3rd) - Wayne Connelly; 15:51 (3rd) - Mike Walton; 18:18 (3rd) - Wayne Connelly / Goals / No scoring
29 (6–13–10)	Shots	27 (9–5–13)

April 19	New England Whalers	1–6 (0–2, 0–1, 1–3)	Minnesota Fighting Saints	St. Paul Civic Center; Attendance: 11,870

Box score
Al Smith	Goalies	John Garrett
12:19 (3rd) - Mike Byers / Goals / 5:01 (1st) - Mike Walton; 17:23 (1st) - Gary Gambucci; 18:40 (2nd) - Mike Walton; 0:22 (3rd) - Wayne Connelly; 5:10 (3rd) - Mike Walton; 16:56 (3rd) - Don Tannahill
33 (7–15–11)	Shots	31 (9–10–12)

=== (W1) Houston Aeros vs. (E2) Cleveland Crusaders ===
Houston had gone 5–1 against Cleveland in the regular season. Fatigue set in for Game 2 as Cleveland allowed three goals in a tight loss. Game 4 went so badly enough for the Crusaders that coach/GM Jack Vivian was angry at the fans who booed goaltender Gerry Cheevers in the third period, which saw a 4–1 deficit go to a 7–2 nightmare that led Vivian to tell the press that the fans were "gutless".

April 10	Cleveland Crusaders	5–8 (2–3, 1–1, 2–4)	Houston Aeros	Sam Houston Coliseum; Attendance: 7,317

Box score
Gerry Cheevers	Goalies	Ron Grahame
0:18 (1st) - Jim Harrison; 5:53 (1st) - Tom Edur; 0:26 (2nd) - Paul Shmyr; 11:20 (3rd) - Gerry Pinder; 16:30 (3rd) - Paul Shmyr / Goals / 5:24 (1st) - Mark Howe; 9:08 (1st) - Frank Hughes; 15:52 (1st) - Terry Ruskowski; 19:32 (2nd) - Ted Taylor; 0:44 (3rd) - Murray Hall; 3:49 (3rd) - Mark Howe; 6:50 (3rd) - Mark Howe; 15:30 (3rd) - Frank Hughes
25 (8–6–11)	Shots	36 (14–13–9)

April 12	Cleveland Crusaders	3–5 (1–1, 0–1, 2–3)	Houston Aeros	Sam Houston Coliseum; Attendance: 7,887

Box score
Gerry Cheevers	Goalies	Ron Grahame
0:47 (1st) - Al McDonough; 7:33 (3rd) - Gerry Pinder; 12:59 (3rd) - Russ Walker / Goals / 6:06 (1st) - Murray Hall; 17:26 (2nd) - Don Larway; 1:34 (3rd) - Larry Lund; 6:10 (3rd) - Murray Hall; 19:28 (3rd) - Mark Howe
37 (15–11–11)	Shots	35 (10–17–8)

April 13	Houston Aeros	1–3 (0–0, 1–1, 0–2)	Cleveland Crusaders	Richfield Coliseum; Attendance: 6,738

Box score
Ron Grahame	Goalies	Gerry Cheevers
7:09 (2nd) - Mark Howe / Goals / 4:52 (2nd) - Al McDonough; 9:51 (3rd) - Larry Hillman; 16:54 (3rd) - Tom Edur
36 (8–13–15)	Shots	37 (9–10–18)

April 15	Houston Aeros	7–2 (2–0, 0–0, 5–2)	Cleveland Crusaders	Richfield Coliseum; Attendance: 7,046

Box score
Ron Grahame	Goalies	Gerry Cheevers
15:46 (1st) - Mark Howe; 19:37 (1st) - Murray Hall; 0:52 (3rd) - Murray Hall; 4:33 (3rd) - Andre Hinse; 5:04 (3rd) - Frank Hughes; 9:42 (3rd) - Mark Howe; 17:08 (3rd) - Mark Howe / Goals / 2:17 (3rd) - Skip Krake; 17:24 (3rd) - Ray Clearwater
36 (12–9–15)	Shots	36 (13–13–9)

April 17	Cleveland Crusaders	1–3 (0–2, 1–0, 0–1)	Houston Aeros	Sam Houston Coliseum; Attendance: 6,825

Box score
Gerry Cheevers	Goalies	Ron Grahame
9:28 (2nd) – Gerry Pinder / Goals / 0:27 (1st) – Gordie Howe; 9:25 (1st) – Larry Lund; 8:52 (3rd) – Ted Taylor
28 (10–9–9)	Shots	40 (19–7–14)

=== (W2) San Diego Mariners vs. (C2) Toronto Toros ===
The two teams split their six regular season matchups.

April 9	Toronto Toros	3–5 (2–1, 1–2, 0–2)	San Diego Mariners	San Diego Sports Arena; Attendance: 8,890

Box score
Jim Shaw	Goalies	Ernie Wakely
8:55 (1st) - Lou Nistico; 13:57 (1st) - Vaclav Nedomansky; 10:09 (2nd) - Gavin Kirk / Goals / 10:58 (1st) - Gene Peacosh; 13:35 (2nd) - Ray Adduono; 17:28 (2nd) - Ray Adduono; 6:13 (3rd) - Wayne Rivers; 19:20 (3rd) - Andre Lacroix
28 (10–14–4)	Shots	45 (16–12–17)

April 12	Toronto Toros	6–7 (0–3, 2–3, 4–1)	San Diego Mariners	San Diego Sports Arena; Attendance: 13,039

Box score
Gilles Gratton / Jim Shaw	Goalies	Ernie Wakely
3:16 (2nd) - Frank Mahovlich; 9:04 (2nd) - Vaclav Nedomansky; 0:26 (3rd) - Gavin Kirk; 12:39 (3rd) - Jim Dorey; 16:51 (3rd) - Lou Nistico; 18:59 (3rd) - Tom Martin / Goals / 2:02 (1st) - Jim Hargreaves; 8:24 (1st) - Andre Lacroix; 15:32 (1st) - Gene Peacosh; 12:08 (2nd) - Gene Peacosh; 15:41 (2nd) - Norm Ferguson; 18:22 (2nd) - Harry Howell; 4:47 (3rd) - Wayne Rivers
40 (15–12–13)	Shots	46 (13–23–10)

April 14	San Diego Mariners	2–5 (0–2, 2–2, 0–1)	Toronto Toros	Maple Leaf Gardens; Attendance: 9,135

Box score
Ernie Wakely / Russ Gillow	Goalies	Les Binkley
4:36 (2nd) - Norm Ferguson; 7:07 (2nd) - Norm Ferguson / Goals / 1:55 (1st) - Gavin Kirk; 18:25 (1st) - Lou Nistico; 12:18 (2nd) - Lou Nistico; 18:06 (2nd) - Tom Simpson; 17:45 (3rd) - Wayne Dillon
28 (11–7–10)	Shots	41 (17–12–12)

April 16	San Diego Mariners	5–6 (1–0, 1–4, 3–2)	Toronto Toros	Maple Leaf Gardens; Attendance: 10,197

Box score
Ernie Wakely	Goalies	Jim Shaw
7:40 (1st) - Norm Ferguson; 5:17 (2nd) - Mike Laughton; 1:05 (3rd) - Gene Peacosh; 10:59 (3rd) - Brian Perry; 19:35 (3rd) - Mike Laughton / Goals / 6:31 (2nd) - Wayne Dillon; 7:26 (2nd) - Lou Nistico; 8:46 (2nd) - Tony Featherstone; 19:12 (2nd) - Wayne Dillon; 5:59 (3rd) - Frank Mahovlich; 7:36 (3rd) - Gavin Kirk
31 (8–14–9)	Shots	45; 10–17–18)

April 18	Toronto Toros	3–4 (1–0, 1–2, 1–2)	San Diego Mariners	San Diego Sports Arena; Attendance: 12,819

Box score
Jim Shaw	Goalies	Ernie Wakely
13:19 (1st) - Frank Mahovlich; 8:26 (2nd) - Vaclav Nedomansky; 4:20 (3rd) - Gavin Kirk / Goals / 10:30 (2nd) - Gene Peacosh; 14:23 (2nd) - Mike Laughton; 4:02 (3rd) - Ray Adduono; 11:59 (3rd) - Gene Peacosh
37 (9–13–15)	Shots	55 (14–19–22)

April 21	San Diego Mariners	6–4 (2–0, 2–2, 2–2)	Toronto Toros	Maple Leaf Gardens; Attendance: 8,830

Box score
Ernie Wakely	Goalies	Les Binkley
13:35 (1st) - Norm Ferguson; 14:16 (1st) - Ray Adduono; 8:20 (2nd) - Norm Ferguson; 11:14 (2nd) - Kevin Devine; 15:16 (3rd) - Gene Peacosh; 19:44 (3rd) - Andre Lacroix / Goals / 8:59 (2nd) - Lou Nistico; 15:21 (2nd) - Wayne Dillon; 4:11 (3rd) - Jim Dorey; 16:30 (3rd) - Tony Featherstone
39 (13–14–12)	Shots	45 (15–13–17)

== Semifinals ==
=== (C1) Quebec Nordiques vs. (W3) Minnesota Fighting Saints ===
Minnesota was 4–2 against Quebec in the regular season. In Game 1, Jeannot Gilbert gave Quebec the lead less than five minutes into the first period. A scoreless second period was followed by three sudden goals by Quebec in the third period that was scored in the span of 150 seconds to give Quebec an insurmountable lead. In Game 2, trailing 2–0 after one period, the Saints shot the puck 20 times in the second period and scored on four of them, with Mike Walton scoring two of them while Minnesota neutralized Quebec's power play multiple times in the final period. Now in Minnesota, the Nordiques dominated Game 3 with a 3–1 first period that saw them lead in the first three minutes on a goal by Marc Tardif before they held the Saints scoreless for the last 52 minutes in a 6–1 win. In Game 4, Fran Huck broke a 2–2 tie in the third period before Wayne Connelly scored three minutes later on a power-play goal to provide insurance in a 4–2 victory to tie the series that saw both goalies save over 35 shots. In Game 5, Quebec scored two goals in the span of a less than a minute through the efforts of Guindon and Bordeleau. Minnesota narrowed the deficit to 3–2 with Mike Walton's goal midway through the second period, but Marc Tardif responded eight seconds later with a goal to make it 4–2 in a game Quebec soon pulled away from. In Game 6, Minnesota took the lead first on a goal by Gary Gambucci six minutes into the game, but Quebec responded with two goals in less than a minute midway through the period. In the third period, Jack Carlson tied the game on his first playoff goal of the postseason. Later in the period, Quebec goalie Richard Brodeur made a save on a breakaway attempt by Mike Antonovich that was soon followed by Quebec scoring the tiebreaking goal on a play by Michel Parizeau. 31 seconds later, now with an empty net for an extra attacker, Rejean Houle drilled in a shot from the blue line to seal the game for Quebec.

April 22	Minnesota Fighting Saints	1–4 (0–1, 0–0, 1–3)	Quebec Nordiques	Colisée de Québec; Attendance: 9,348

Box score
John Garrett	Goalies	Richard Brodeur
19:27 (3rd) - Mike Walton / Goals / 15:21 (1st) - Jeannot Gilbert; 11:16 (3rd) - Rene LeClerc; 11:48 (3rd) - Jeannot Gilbert; 13:46 (3rd) - Rejean Houle
31 (12-9-10)	Shots	38 (15-17-6)

April 24	Minnesota Fighting Saints	5–3 (0–2, 4–1, 1–0)	Quebec Nordiques	Colisée de Québec; Attendance: 11,249

Box score
John Garrett	Goalies	Richard Brodeur
1:17 (2nd) - George Morrison; 10:27 (2nd) - Mike Walton; 15:25 (2nd) - Rick Smith; 19:12 (2nd) - Mike Walton; 6:02 (3rd) - Mike Antonovich / Goals / 10:40 (1st) - Marc Tardif; 13:23 (1st) - Alan Globensky; 6:39 (2nd) - Marc Tardif
47 (17-20-10)	Shots	26 (9-9-8)

April 26	Quebec Nordiques	6–1 (3–1, 1–0, 2–0)	Minnesota Fighting Saints	St. Paul Civic Center; Attendance: 11,283

Box score
Richard Brodeur	Goalies	John Garrett
2:09 (1st) - Marc Tardif; 7:23 (1st) - Rejean Houle; 12:12 (1st) - Serge Bernier; 15:46 (2nd) - Real Cloutier; 15:52 (3rd) - Bobby Guindon; 17:23 (3rd) - Rene LeClerc / Goals / 7:39 (1st) - Ted Hampson
40 (12-13-15)	Shots	28 (11-5-12)

April 27	Quebec Nordiques	2–4 (1–1, 1–1, 0–2)	Minnesota Fighting Saints	St. Paul Civic Center; Attendance: 9,278

Box score
Richard Brodeur	Goalies	John Garrett
16:03 (1st) - Serge Bernier; 7:25 (2nd) - Bobby Guindon / Goals / 19:18 (1st) - Terry Ball; 10:30 (2nd) - Don Tannahill; 12:02 (3rd) - Fran Huck; 14:57 (3rd) - Wayne Connelly
41 (14-16-11)	Shots	38 (14-15-9)

April 29	Minnesota Fighting Saints	3–6 (0–2, 2–2, 1–2)	Quebec Nordiques	Colisée de Québec; Attendance: 8,844

Box score
John Garrett	Goalies	Richard Brodeur
2:01 (2nd) - Wayne Connelly; 8:53 (2nd) - Mike Walton; 8:43 (3rd) - George Morrison / Goals / 12:21 (1st) - Bobby Guindon; 13:08 (1st) - Christian Bordeleau; 4:31 (2nd) - Real Cloutier; 9:01 (2nd) - Marc Tardif; 5:57 (3rd) - Rene LeClerc; 19:13 (3rd) - Real Cloutier
38 (8-18-12)	Shots	41 (17-10-14)

May 1	Quebec Nordiques	4–2 (2–1, 0–0, 2–1)	Minnesota Fighting Saints	St. Paul Civic Center; Attendance: 9,144

Box score
Richard Brodeur	Goalies	John Garrett
11:43 (1st) - Real Cloutier; 12:33 (1st) - Rene Leclerc; 15:45 (3rd) - Michel Parizeau; 19:29 (3rd) - Rejean Houle / Goals / 6:05 (1st) - Gary Gambucci; 0:15 (3rd) - Jack Carlson
34 (14-6-14)	Shots	38 (13-14-11)

=== (W1) Houston Aeros vs. (W2) San Diego Mariners ===
San Diego had gone 5–1 against Houston in the regular season. A matchup of the top team in scoring/defense versus the fourth-best team in scoring/defense, the Aeros held San Diego to shutouts in two of the first three games before having to rally to force overtime in the pivotal Game 4. On the first shot in overtime, rookie Jim Sherrit ended the game with his goal to send Houston back to the Avco Cup.

April 25	Houston Aeros	4–0 (1–0, 2–0, 1–0)	San Diego Mariners	San Diego Sports Arena; Attendance: 12,342

Box score
Ron Grahame	Goalies	Ernie Wakely
11:31 (1st) - Andre Hinse; 3:51 (2nd) - Murray Hall; 4:52 (2nd) - Terry Ruskowski; 19:16 (3rd) - Gord Labossiere / Goals / No scoring
35 (11–13–11)	Shots	35 (14–12–9)

April 27	Houston Aeros	2–1 (0–0, 2–0, 0–1)	San Diego Mariners	San Diego Sports Arena; Attendance: 7,816

Box score
Ron Grahame	Goalies	Ernie Wakely
17:11 (2nd) – Murray Hall; 17:36 (2nd) – Jim Sherrit / Goals / 10:33 (3rd) - Wayne Rivers
23 (6–9–8)	Shots	48 (18–11–19)

April 29	San Diego Mariners	0–6 (0–2, 0–2, 0–2)	Houston Aeros	Sam Houston Coliseum; Attendance: 6,827

Box score
Ernie Wakely / Russ Gillow	Goalies	Ron Grahame
No scoring / Goals / 11:25 (1st) – Mark Howe; 11:46 (1st) – Andre Hinse; 10:41 (2nd) – Gord Labossiere; 12:28 (2nd) – Andre Hinse; 2:58 (3rd) – Larry Lund; 6:12 (3rd) - Gordie Howe
34 (16–6–12)	Shots	37 (12–12–13)

May 1	San Diego Mariners	4–5 (OT) (2–1, 1–1, 1–2, 0–1)	Houston Aeros	Sam Houston Coliseum; Attendance: 7,932

Box score
Russ Gillow / Ernie Wakely	Goalies	Ron Grahame
4:11 (1st) - Ray Adduono; 12:30 (1st) - Ron Plumb; 3:47 (2nd) - Mike Laughton; 4:37 (3rd) - Ron Plumb / Goals / 7:09 (1st) - Rich Preston; 6:40 (2nd) - Don Larway; 0:21 (3rd) - Jim Sherrit; 5:31 (3rd) - Gordie Howe; 0:27 (OT) - Jim Sherrit
37 (17–8–12–0)	Shots	50 (11–16–22–1)

== Avco Cup Final ==
=== (W1) Houston Aeros vs. (C1) Quebec Nordiques ===
The series matched the Western Division champion Houston Aeros, as coached by Bill Dineen, against the Canadian Division champion Quebec Nordiques, as coached by Jean-Guy Gendron. The two teams had split their six regular season matchups.

The Aeros, having lost only one playoff game leading to the Finals, did not have many problems with Quebec, who only had a lead for a combined thirteen minutes in the whole series, all of which came during Game 2, where Quebec scored a goal on three occasions to break a tie during the game that was followed by Houston tying the game each time before Houston pulled away in the final period. Game 3, the first modern-era professional championship game in Quebec City, was attended by 9,775 fans. Frank Hughes broke the scoreless tie 14 seconds in the second period before Poul Popiel added in insurance in the third period for a 2–0 win. In Game 4 (to 8,246 attending fans), the Aeros clinched the championship with a dominant fourth game, with Gord Labossiere delivering the series-winning goal at 19:53 in the first period to give them a 3–1 lead in an eventual 7–2 victory. Ron Grahame, who played every minute as goaltender for the Aeros and went 12–1 with ten straight wins (a record), won the first WHA Playoff MVP.

Gordie Howe mulled retirement after the game ended for a front office job, although he would ultimately play for five more years. WHA chief referee Bill Friday announced his retirement after the end of Game 4 (ultimately, he served as referee-in-chief for the last three WHA seasons before being the referee for the final WHA game in 1979). This was the last professional championship for the city of Houston until the Houston Rockets won the 1994 NBA Finals nineteen years later.

This was the only time the Avco World Trophy was clinched on enemy ice.

May 3	Quebec Nordiques	2–6	Houston Aeros	Sam Houston Coliseum	Recap
No scoring		First period	1:26 – Gord Labossiere (Popiel, Schella); 2:36 – Larry Lund (Mark Howe, G. Howe); 12:13 – Gordie Howe (Schella, Preston); 17:54 – Terry Ruskowski (Popiel, Larway)
17:51 – Marc Tardif (Bordeleau, Hoganson)		Second period	4:37 – Don Larway (Ruskowski)
3:45 – Bob Guindon (Bordeleau)		Third period	1:45 – Gord Labossiere (Taylor, Hughes)
Richard Brodeur 30 saves / 36 shots		Goalie stats	Ron Grahame 23 saves / 25 shots

May 6	Quebec Nordiques	3–5	Houston Aeros	Sam Houston Coliseum	Recap
16:34 – Dale Hoganson (S. Bernier, Houle)		First period	4:44 – Gordie Howe (Mark Howe, Sherrit)
2:57 – Marc Tardif (Guindon, Bordeleau)		Second period	1:19 – Gordie Howe (Lund, Hughes)
2:37 – Marc Tardif (Bordeleau)		Third period	2:06 – Gord Labossiere (Hall, Taylor); 3:04 – Terry Ruskowski (Preston, Irwin); 11:08 – Andre Hinse (Lund, Schella)
Richard Brodeur 42 saves / 47 shots		Goalie stats	Ron Grahame 23 saves / 26 shots

May 10	Houston Aeros	2–0	Quebec Nordiques	Colisée de Québec	Recap
No scoring		First period	No scoring
0:14 – Frank Hughes (G. Howe, Mark Howe)		Second period	No scoring
13:48 – Poul Popiel (Schella)		Third period	No scoring
Ron Grahame 34 saves / 34 shots		Goalie stats	Richard Brodeur 22 saves / 24 shots

May 12	Houston Aeros	7–2	Quebec Nordiques	Colisée de Québec	Recap
2:41 – Gordie Howe (Hinse, Lund); 12:18 – Mark Howe (Hinse, Lund); 19:53 – Gord Labossiere (Schella, Hall).		First period	6:01 – Rejean Houle (Tardif, S. Bernier)
7:36 – Gordie Howe (Lund); 16:52 – Frank Hughes (Mark Howe, Sherrit)		Second period	14:51 – Rejean Houle (S. Bernier, Brodeur)
14:07 – Larry Lund (Popiel); 18:30 – Frank Hughes (G. Howe, Lund)		Third period	No scoring
Ron Grahame 36 shots / 38 shots		Goalie stats	Richard Brodeur 24 shots / 31 shots

Houston won series 4–0

== Statistical leaders ==
=== Skaters ===
These were the top ten skaters based on points.

Player	Team	GP	G	A	Pts	PIM
Mark Howe	Houston Aeros	13	10	12	22	0
Marc Tardif	Quebec Nordiques	15	10	11	21	10
Gordie Howe	Houston Aeros	13	8	12	20	20
Larry Lund	Houston Aeros	13	5	13	18	13
Mike Walton	Minnesota Fighting Saints	12	10	7	17	10
Serge Bernier	Quebec Nordiques	15	8	8	16	6
Rejean Houle	Quebec Nordiques	15	10	6	16	2
Fran Huck	Minnesota Fighting Saints	12	3	13	16	6
Christian Bordeleau	Quebec Nordiques	15	2	13	15	2
Ray Adduono	San Diego Mariners	10	5	9	14	13
Rene Leclerc	Quebec Nordiques	14	7	7	14	41
George Morrison	Minnesota Fighting Saints	12	5	9	14	0

=== Goaltending ===
These were the top five goaltenders in terms of minutes.

Player	Team	GA	SA	SV	SV%	SO	MIN	GAA
Ron Grahame	Houston Aeros	26	439	413	.941	3	780	2.00
Richard Brodeur	Quebec Nordiques	48	550	502	.913	1	906	3.18

== Championship roster ==
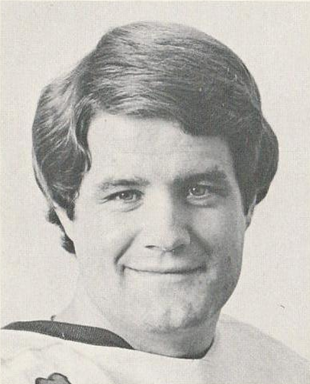
Ron Grahame won the very first WHA Playoff MVP award for the Aeros. As it turned out, he would be the only goaltender to win the award in WHA history.

1974–75 Houston Aeros

=== Players ===
Centres

- Gord Labossiere
- Larry Lund
- Terry Ruskowski
- Jim Sherrit

Wingers

- Marty Howe
- Gordie Howe
- Andre Hinse
- Frank Hughes
- Murray Hall
- Ted Taylor (Captain)
- Don Larway
- Rich Preston

Defencemen

- Larry Hale
- John Schella
- Poul Popiel
- Mark Howe
- Bill Prentice
- Glen Irwin

Goaltenders

- Ron Grahame
- Wayne Rutledge (did not play in playoffs)

=== Coaching and administrative staff ===
- Bill Dineen (coach and general manager)
- Bobby Brown (Head Trainer)
- Bobby Kincaid (Equipment Manager) & Bob Skelton (Assistant Equipment Manager)
- Dr. Eugene Crabtree
- Dr. Alfred Knoll
- Dr. William Rylee
