= List of Birmingham Bulls (WHA) players =

This is a list of players who played at least one game for the Birmingham Bulls of the World Hockey Association from 1976–77 to 1978–79.

- Rick Adduono
- Steve Alley
- Danny Arndt
- Terry Ball
- Frank Beaton
- Serge Beaudoin
- Gilles Bilodeau
- Wayne Carleton
- Tony Cassolato
- Keith Crowder
- Rick Cunningham
- Wayne Dillon
- Steve Durbano
- Chris Evans
- Richard Farda
- Peter Folco
- Gord Gallant
- John Garrett
- Gaston Gingras
- Dave Gorman
- Michel Goulet
- David Hanson
- Rich Hart
- Craig Hartsburg
- Paul Heaver
- Paul Henderson
- Dale Hoganson
- Brent Hughes
- Jeff Jacques
- Gavin Kirk
- Keith Kokkola
- Jean-Guy Lagace
- Rod Langway
- Ken Linseman
- Frank Mahovlich
- Peter Marrin
- Jim Marsh
- Ray McKay
- Mark Napier
- Václav Nedomanský
- Lou Nistico
- Joe Noris
- Paul O'Neil
- Jean-Luc Phaneuf
- Rob Ramage
- Pat Riggin
- Phil Roberto
- Jerry Rollins
- Buzz Schneider
- Timothy Sheehy
- Tom Simpson
- Louis Sleigher
- Bob Stephenson
- John Stewart (born 1950)
- John Stewart (born 1954)
- Dave Syvret
- Greg Tebbutt
- Paul Terbenche
- Jim Turkiewicz
- Rick Vaive
- Ernie Wakely
- Pat Westrum
- Wayne Wood
