= WHA All-Star Game =

The World Hockey Association was a professional hockey league founded in 1973. The WHA ceased to exist after merging with the National Hockey League in 1979. In total, the league held seven all-star games, with four of the matchups involving the Western and Eastern Divisions. Two matched league All-Stars against world competition and one utilized the defending Avco Cup champion. All except the last edition was one game, as the league elected to use their All-Star team (composed of five of the six surviving teams) to play Moscow Dynamo for three games.

== List of games ==
| Eastern Division (3 wins) | Western Division (1 win) | Canada (2 wins) | WHA All-Stars (1 win) |

| Year | Result | Host arena | Host city | Game MVP |
|---|---|---|---|---|
| 1973 | Eastern 6, Western 2 | Colisée de Québec | Quebec | Wayne Carleton, Ottawa Nationals |
| 1974 | Eastern 8, Western 4 | St. Paul Civic Center | St. Paul, Minnesota | Mike Walton, Minnesota Fighting Saints |
| 1975 | Western 6, Eastern 4 | Edmonton Coliseum | Edmonton, Alberta | Rejean Houle, Quebec Nordiques |
| 1976 | Canada 6, United States 1 | Richfield Coliseum | Cleveland, Ohio | Canada: Real Cloutier (Quebec); Paul Shmyr (Cleveland) |
| 1977 | Eastern 4, Western 2 | Hartford Civic Center | Hartford, Connecticut | Western: Willy Lindstrom, Winnipeg Jets; Eastern: Jean-Louis Levasseur |
| 1978 | Quebec Nordiques 5, WHA All-Stars 4 | Colisée de Québec | Quebec | WHA: Mark Howe, New England Whalers; Quebec: Marc Tardif |
| 1979 | WHA All-Stars 4 Moscow Dynamo 2 WHA All-Stars 4, Moscow Dynamo 2 WHA All-Stars 4, Moscow Dynamo 3 | Edmonton Coliseum | Edmonton, Canada | No MVP |
