= 1976 WHA All-Star Game =

	1	2	3	Total
Canadian	0	3	3	6
United States	0	0	1	1
- Date: January 13, 1976
- Arena: Cleveland Coliseum
- City: Cleveland, Ohio
- MVP: Real Cloutier & Paul Shmyr
- Attendance: 15,491

The 1976 World Hockey Association All-Star Game was held in the Cleveland Coliseum in Cleveland, Ohio, home of the Cleveland Crusaders, on January 13, 1976. The game pitted the Canadian All-Stars, which consisted of players from the five Canadian Division teams, against the United States All-Stars, which consisted of players from the nine teams in the Eastern and Western Divisions.

The Canadian All-Stars defeated the United States All-Stars 6–1. Real Cloutier, who scored a hattrick, was named the Most Valuable Player for the Canadian team and Paul Shmyr was named the Most Valuable Player for the United States team.

== Team Lineups ==
=== Canadian All-Stars ===
- Coach: Jean-Guy Gendron (Quebec Nordiques)

Nat.	Player	Pos.	Team
Goaltenders
(Canada)	Joe Daley^{A~}		Winnipeg Jets
(Canada)	Don McLeod^{B}		Calgary Cowboys
(Canada)	Jim Shaw^{‡}		Toronto Toros
Defencemen
(Sweden)	Lars-Erik Sjoberg^{A}		Winnipeg Jets
(Canada)	J. C. Tremblay^{A~}		Quebec Nordiques
(Canada)	Barry Long^{B}		Edmonton Oilers
(Canada)	Larry Hornung^{B}		Winnipeg Jets
(Sweden)	Thommie Bergman		Winnipeg Jets
(Poland)	John Miszuk		Calgary Cowboys
(Canada)	Paul Terbenche^{†}		Calgary Cowboys
Forwards
(Czech Republic)	Vaclav Nedomansky^{A}	C	Toronto Toros
(Sweden)	Anders Hedberg^{A}	RW	Winnipeg Jets
(Canada)	Bobby Hull^{A}	LW	Winnipeg Jets
(Sweden)	Ulf Nilsson^{B}	C	Winnipeg Jets
(Canada)	Marc Tardif^{B}	LW	Quebec Nordiques
(Canada)	Real Cloutier^{B}	RW	Quebec Nordiques
(Canada)	Serge Bernier	C	Quebec Nordiques
(Canada)	Chris Bordeleau	C	Quebec Nordiques
(Canada)	Frank Mahovlich	LW	Toronto Toros
(Canada)	Rejean Houle	LW	Quebec Nordiques
(Canada)	Danny Lawson	RW	Calgary Cowboys
(Canada)	Rusty Patenaude	RW	Edmonton Oilers

=== United States All-Stars ===
- Coach: Bill Dineen (Houston Aeros)

Nat.	Player	Pos.	Team
Goaltenders
(Canada)	Gerry Cheevers^{A}		Cleveland Crusaders
(Sweden)	Christer Abrahamsson^{B}		New England Whalers
Defencemen
(Canada)	Paul Shmyr^{A}		Cleveland Crusaders
(Canada)	Pat Stapleton^{A}		Indianapolis Racers
(Canada)	Kevin Morrison^{B}		San Diego Mariners
(Canada)	John Schella^{B}		Houston Aeros
(United States)	Marty Howe		Houston Aeros
(Canada)	Rick Ley		New England Whalers
Forwards
(Canada)	Andre Lacroix^{A}	C	San Diego Mariners
(Canada)	Gene Peacosh^{A}	LW	San Diego Mariners
(Canada)	Gordie Howe^{A}	RW	Houston Aeros
(Canada)	Dave Keon^{B}	C	Minnesota Fighting Saints
(Canada)	Claude Larose^{B}	LW	Cincinnati Stingers
(Canada)	Mike Walton^{B}	RW	Minnesota Fighting Saints
(United States)	Robbie Ftorek	C	Phoenix Roadrunners
(Canada)	Wayne Carleton	C	New England Whalers
(United States)	Mark Howe	LW	Houston Aeros
(Canada)	Ralph Backstrom	LW	Denver Spurs/Ottawa Civics
(Canada)	Tom Webster	RW	New England Whalers
(Canada)	Don Borgeson	RW	Denver Spurs/Ottawa Civics

- ^{A} Voted to first team.
- ^{B} Voted to second team.
- ^{~} Unable to participate due to injury.
- ^{‡} Replaced Joe Daley due to injury.
- ^{†} Replaced J. C. Tremblay due to injury.

G = Goaltender; D = Defenceman; C = Center; LW = Left Wing; RW = Right Wing

== Game summary ==
#	Score	Team	Goalscorer (Assist(s))	Time
First period
No scoring
Penalties : Ley (USA) 0:29, Schella (USA) 8:37, Hull (Canada) 8:37, Patenaude (Canada) 12:48
Second period
1	1-0	Canada	Cloutier (Tardif)	1:45
2	2-0	Canada	Mahovlich (Bergman)	11:50
3	3-0	Canada	Cloutier (Sjoberg, Bordeleau)	16:44 [pp]
Penalties : Backstrom (USA) 14:58, Long (Canada) 18:03
Third period
4	4-0	Canada	Lawson (unassisted)	3:50 [sh]
5	4-1	U.S.A.	Lacroix (Ley)	13:26
6	5-1	Canada	Nilsson (Hedberg, Miszuk)	15:33
7	6-1	Canada	Cloutier (Bordeleau, Tardif)	18:04
Penalties : Nedomanský (Canada) 3:32, Long (Canada) 18:45

Goaltenders :

- Canada: McLeod, Shaw.
- U.S.A.: Cheevers, Abrahamsson.

Shots on goal :

- Canada (30) 8 - 9 - 13
- U.S.A. (25) 9 - 9 - 7

Referee : Bill Friday

Linesmen : Ross Keenan, Graham Hern

== See also ==
- 1975–76 WHA season
