= 1973 WHA All-Star Game =

	1	2	3	Total
West	1	0	1	2
East	1	3	2	6
- Date: January 6, 1973
- Arena: Le Colisée
- City: Quebec City, Quebec
- MVP: Wayne Carleton
- Attendance: 5,435

The 1973 World Hockey Association All-Star Game was held in the Le Colisée in Quebec City, Quebec home of the Quebec Nordiques, on January 6, 1973. After a plan to pit WHA players against European players fell down due to legal reasons, the league instead pitted the two divisions against each other for an All-Star Game. The East All-Stars defeated the West All-Stars 6–2. Wayne Carleton was named the game's Most Valuable Player.

== Team Lineups ==
=== East All-Stars ===
- Coach: Jack Kelley (New England Whalers)

Nat.	Player	Pos.	Team
Goaltenders
(Canada)	Al Smith		New England Whalers
(Canada)	Gerry Cheevers		Cleveland Crusaders
(Canada)	Serge Aubry^{~}		Quebec Nordiques
Defencemen
(Canada)	Rick Ley		New England Whalers
(Canada)	J. C. Tremblay		Quebec Nordiques
(Canada)	Paul Shmyr		Cleveland Crusaders
(Canada)	Jim Dorey		New England Whalers
(Canada)	Ken Block		New York Raiders
(Canada)	John Hanna		Cleveland Crusaders
Forwards
(Canada)	Ron Ward	C	New York Raiders
(United States)	Larry Pleau	C	New England Whalers
(Canada)	Terry Caffery^{‡}	C	New England Whalers
(Canada)	Bob Charlebois	C	Ottawa Nationals
(Canada)	Tom Webster	RW	New England Whalers
(Canada)	Danny Lawson	RW	Philadelphia Blazers
(Canada)	Norm Ferguson	RW	New York Raiders
(Canada)	John McKenzie	RW	Philadelphia Blazers
(Canada)	Guy Trottier^{†}	RW	Ottawa Nationals
(Canada)	Wayne Carleton	LW	Ottawa Nationals
(Canada)	Gary Jarrett	LW	Cleveland Crusaders
(Canada)	Gerry Pinder	LW	Cleveland Crusaders
(Canada)	Michel Parizeau	LW	Quebec Nordiques

- ^{~} Suited, but did not participate.
- ^{‡} Replaced Bobby Sheehan due to injury.
- ^{†} Replaced Ron Climie due to injury.

=== West All-Stars ===
- Coach: Bobby Hull (Winnipeg Jets)
  Assisted by: Nick Mickoski (Winnipeg Jets)

Nat.	Player	Pos.	Team
Goaltenders
(United States)	Mike Curran		Minnesota Fighting Saints
(Canada)	Ernie Wakely		Winnipeg Jets
(Canada)	Jack Norris		Alberta Oilers
Defencemen
(Canada)	Al Hamilton		Alberta Oilers
(Canada)	Larry Hornung		Winnipeg Jets
(Canada)	Gerry Odrowski		Los Angeles Sharks
(Canada)	Ron Anderson		Chicago Cougars
(Canada)	Terry Ball		Minnesota Fighting Saints
(Canada)	Mike McMahon		Minnesota Fighting Saints
(Canada)	Bart Crashley		Los Angeles Sharks
Forwards
(Canada)	Christian Bordeleau	C	Winnipeg Jets
(Canada)	Gord Labossiere	C	Houston Aeros
(Canada)	Jim Harrison	C	Alberta Oilers
(Canada)	Ted Hampson	C	Minnesota Fighting Saints
(Canada)	Wayne Connelly	RW	Minnesota Fighting Saints
(Canada)	Norm Beaudin	RW	Winnipeg Jets
(Canada)	Mike Byers	RW	Los Angeles Sharks
(Canada)	Bob Wall	RW	Alberta Oilers
(Canada)	Bobby Hull	LW	Winnipeg Jets
(Canada)	Ted Taylor	LW	Houston Aeros
(Canada)	Gary Veneruzzo	LW	Los Angeles Sharks
(Denmark)	Jan Popiel	LW	Chicago Cougars

G = Goaltender; D = Defenceman; C = Center; LW = Left Wing; RW = Right Wing

== Game summary ==
#	Score	Team	Goalscorer (Assist(s))	Time
First period
1	1-0	West	Odrowski (Beaudin)	10:39
2	1-1	East	Jarrett (Ward)	10:51
Penalties : Pleau (East) 4:43, Hanna (East) 12:09, Shmyr (East) 17:25, Harrison (West) 19:23
Second period
3	1-2	East	McKenzie (Carleton, Block)	3:37
4	1-3	East	Pleau (Webster, Caffery)	12:47
5	1-4	East	Dorey (Ward, Lawson)	19:43
Penalties : None
Third period
6	2-4	West	Hull (Connelly, Bordeleau)	3:05
7	2-5	East	Lawson (Jarrett, Tremblay)	7:29
8	2-6	East	Carleton (Charlebois, Dorey)	8:00
Penalties : None

Goaltenders :

- East: Smith (30 minutes, 1 goal against), Cheevers (30 minutes, 1 goal against).
- West: Wakely (20 minutes, 1 goal against), Norris (20 minutes, 3 goals against), Curran (20 minutes, 2 goals against).

Shots on goal :

- East (47) 18 - 14 - 15
- West (33) 8 - 13 - 12

Referee : Bill Friday

Linesmen : Pierre Belanger, Ron Asselstine

== See also ==
- 1972–73 WHA season
