= Nistico =

Nistico is a surname. Notable people with the surname include:

- Lou Nistico (1953–2020), Canadian ice hockey player
- Sal Nistico (1940–1991), American jazz tenor saxophonist
