= Murray Hall (ice hockey) =

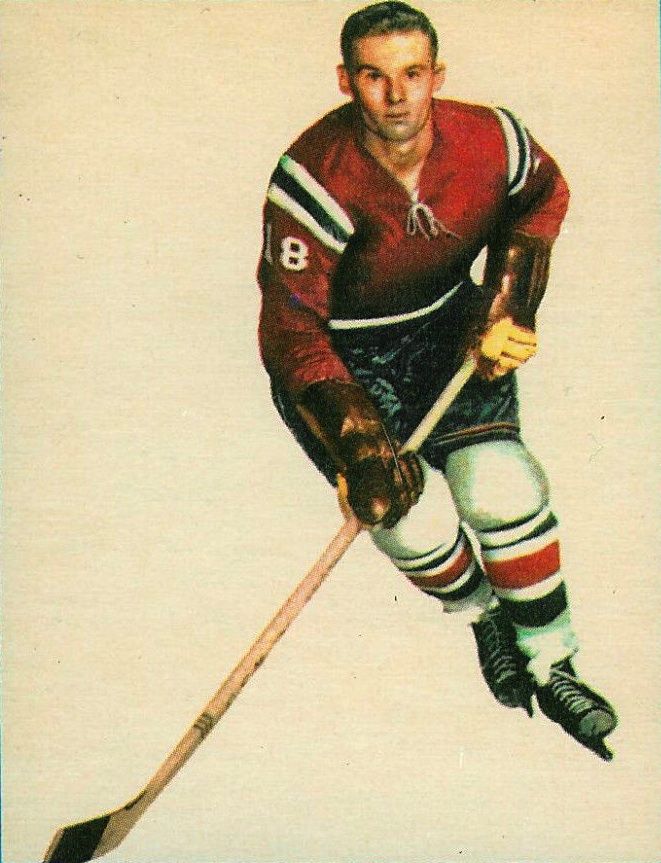
- Born: November 24, 1940 (age 85) Kirkland Lake, Ontario, Canada
- Height: 5 ft 11 in (180 cm)
- Weight: 175 lb (79 kg; 12 st 7 lb)
- Position: Right wing
- Shot: Right
- Played for: Chicago Black Hawks; Detroit Red Wings; Minnesota North Stars; Vancouver Canucks; Houston Aeros (WHA)
- Playing career: 1961–1976

Murray Winston Hall (born November 24, 1940) is a Canadian former professional ice hockey player who played in the National Hockey League and World Hockey Association during the 1960s and 1970s.

== Playing career ==
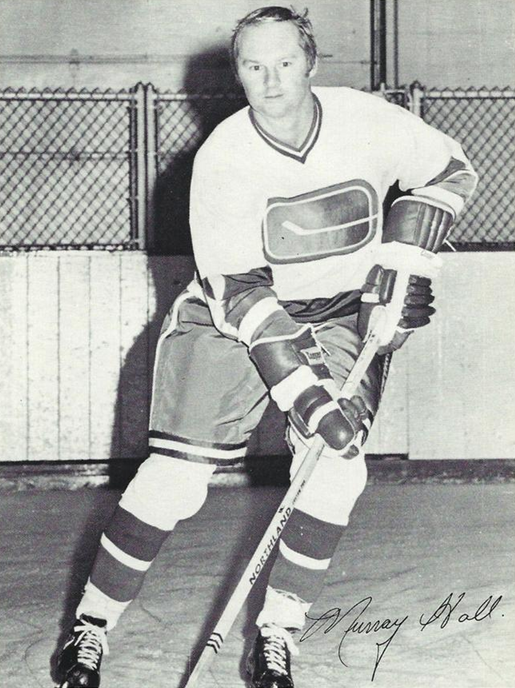
Hall was among the players on the first NHL season of the Vancouver Canucks in 1970

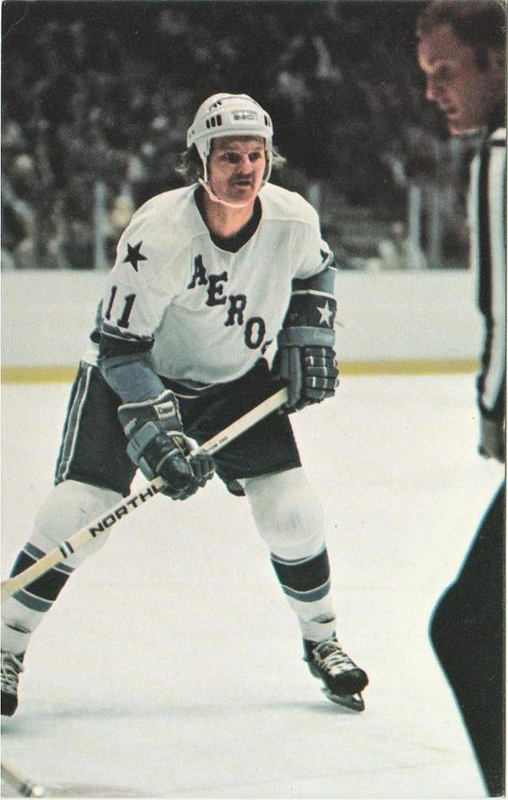
Hall (pictured in 1975) was a key part of the back-to-back Avco World Trophy wins for the Houston Aeros.

A talented offensive winger, Hall was signed by the Chicago Black Hawks as a teenager and came up through their junior system, turning pro in 1961. In 1961–62, he scored 21 goals as the youngest player on the AHL Buffalo Bisons, Chicago's top minor-league affiliate. He appeared in his first two NHL games. Hall also received a surprising opportunity to play in the NHL All-Star Game, which at the time was between the defending Stanley Cup champions (Chicago won in 1961), and a team of all-stars from the rest of the league. Chicago took the opportunity to give Hall and Chico Maki, two of their top prospects, some valuable experience.

Over the next two seasons, Hall established himself as an elite minor-league scorer (playing on a line with and outscoring Phil Esposito in the EPHL in 1962–63), but struggled to take the next step to the NHL. In 1963–64, he scored just 2 points in 23 games in Chicago, and following the season was selected by the Detroit Red Wings in the intra-league draft. In Detroit, his fortunes were much the same. He easily led the Wings' AHL affiliate in scoring over the next two years, but only appeared in a few games in Detroit. In 1966–67, he finally produced in NHL action, scoring 4 goals and 7 points in a 12-game stint in Detroit.

Selected by the Minnesota North Stars in the 1967 NHL Expansion Draft, Hall was expected to be a key part of their first-year squad but struggled scoring just 3 points in 17 games, and his rights were dealt to the Toronto Maple Leafs. He was assigned to the Vancouver Canucks of the Western Hockey League in 1968, and spent the following two seasons there.

In 1970, the owners of the Canucks were granted an NHL expansion franchise of the same name, and Hall was one of several players who stayed with the organization. This time, he took advantage of his opportunity, scoring 21 goals and 38 assists for 59 points, good for 4th on the team in scoring and 2nd in assists. However, his scoring touch didn't last as he slumped to just 6 goals and 12 points in 32 games in 1971–72, and found himself back in the AHL.

Hall jumped to the upstart World Hockey Association for 1972–73, one of four Canucks (along with Ted Taylor, Poul Popiel, and John Schella) to sign with the Houston Aeros. He rediscovered his scoring touch in the WHA, scoring 70 points in his first year in Houston. With the arrival of Gordie Howe in 1973, Houston dominated the WHA over the next two seasons, and Hall was a key component of teams that won back-to-back Avco Cup championships in 1974 and 1975, scoring an impressive 16 goals in 27 playoff games over those two years. Hall spent one more season with Houston in 1975–76 and had a brief stint in the CHL before retiring in 1977.

In 164 NHL games, Hall recorded 35 goals and 48 assists for 83 points, and 46 penalty minutes. In an additional 312 WHA contests, he netted 96 goals and added 125 assists for 221 points, along with 155 penalty minutes.

== Career statistics ==
=== Regular season and playoffs ===
			Regular season					Playoffs
Season	Team	League	GP	G	A	Pts	PIM	GP	G	A	Pts	PIM
1959–60	St. Catharines Teepees	OHA	48	17	15	32	22	17	2	7	9	6
1960–61	St. Catharines Teepees	OHA	48	35	41	76	60	6	3	1	4	2
1960–61	Sault Thunderbirds	EPHL	—	—	—	—	—	8	0	2	2	2
1961–62	Chicago Black Hawks	NHL	2	0	0	0	0	—	—	—	—	—
1961–62	Buffalo Bisons	AHL	68	20	21	41	41	11	3	1	4	4
1962–63	St. Louis Braves	EPHL	71	29	69	98	41	—	—	—	—	—
1962–63	Chicago Black Hawks	NHL	—	—	—	—	—	4	0	0	0	0
1963–64	Chicago Black Hawks	NHL	23	2	0	2	4	—	—	—	—	—
1963–64	St. Louis Braves	CHL	28	17	40	57	35	6	2	4	6	0
1964–65	Pittsburgh Hornets	AHL	72	29	33	62	29	4	0	0	0	4
1964–65	Detroit Red Wings	NHL	—	—	—	—	—	1	0	0	0	0
1965–66	Detroit Red Wings	NHL	1	0	0	0	0	1	0	0	0	0
1965–66	Pittsburgh Hornets	AHL	70	28	45	73	102	3	0	3	3	0
1966–67	Detroit Red Wings	NHL	12	4	3	7	4	—	—	—	—	—
1966–67	Pittsburgh Hornets	AHL	12	5	11	16	10	—	—	—	—	—
1966–67	Los Angeles Blades	WHL	43	18	28	46	28	—	—	—	—	—
1967–68	Minnesota North Stars	NHL	17	2	1	3	10	—	—	—	—	—
1967–68	Memphis South Stars	CHL	12	3	8	11	23	—	—	—	—	—
1967–68	Rochester Americans	AHL	38	17	14	31	19	11	5	9	14	2
1968–69	Vancouver Canucks	WHL	69	28	37	65	34	8	2	3	5	0
1969–70	Vancouver Canucks	WHL	72	27	55	82	42	11	10	11	21	10
1970–71	Vancouver Canucks	NHL	77	21	38	59	22	—	—	—	—	—
1971–72	Vancouver Canucks	NHL	32	6	6	12	6	—	—	—	—	—
1971–72	Rochester Americans	AHL	37	10	32	42	70	—	—	—	—	—
1972–73	Houston Aeros	WHA	76	28	42	70	84	10	4	4	8	18
1973–74	Houston Aeros	WHA	78	30	28	58	25	14	9	6	15	6
1974–75	Houston Aeros	WHA	78	18	29	47	28	13	7	3	10	8
1975–76	Houston Aeros	WHA	80	20	26	46	18	17	1	4	5	0
1976–77	Oklahoma City Blazers	CHL	30	8	13	21	2	—	—	—	—	—
WHA totals			312	96	125	221	155	54	21	17	38	32
NHL totals			164	35	48	83	46	6	0	0	0	0
