= Bill Friday =

Bill Friday may refer to:

- William C. Friday (1920–2012), American educator
- Bill Friday (ice hockey), retired Canadian ice hockey referee
