= 1978 WHA All-Star Game =

	1	2	3	Total
WHA All-Stars	3	1	0	4
Quebec Nordiques	1	3	1	5
- Date: January 17, 1978
- Arena: Colisée de Québec
- City: Quebec City, Quebec
- MVP: Mark Howe & Marc Tardif
- Attendance: 6,413

The 1978 World Hockey Association All-Star Game was held in the Colisée de Québec in Quebec City, Quebec on January 17, 1978. The game pitted the WHA All-Stars against the defending Avco Cup champion Quebec Nordiques. The Most Valuable Player Awards were given to Mark Howe (all-stars) and Marc Tardif (Quebec).

== Team lineups ==
=== Quebec ===
Coach: Marc Boileau

Goaltenders: Ken Broderick, Jim Corsi

Defensemen: Paul Baxter, Jean Bernier, Garry Lariviere, J. C. Tremblay, Chris Evans, Jim Dorey.

Forwards: Paulin Bordeleau, André Boudrias, Curt Brackenbury, Réal Cloutier, Warren Miller, Marc Tardif, Steve Sutherland, Bob Fitchner, Norm Dube, Matti Hagman, Serge Bernier, Charles Constantin.

=== WHA All-Stars ===
Coach: Bill Dineen (Houston).

Goaltenders: Al Smith (New England), John Garrett (Birmingham).

Defensemen: Rick Ley, Gordie Roberts (New England), Al Hamilton (Edmonton), Pat Stapleton (Cincinnati), Barry Long, Lars-Erik Sjoberg (Winnipeg).

Forwards: Bobby Hull, Anders Hedberg, Ulf Nilsson (Winnipeg), Bill Flett (Edmonton), Mark Napier (Birmingham), Mark Howe, Mike Antonovich, Gordie Howe (New England), Andre Lacroix, Morris Lukowich (Houston), Rusty Patenaude (Indianapolis), Robbie Ftorek (Cincinnati).
