= Marc Tardif =

Canadian ice hockey player (born 1949)

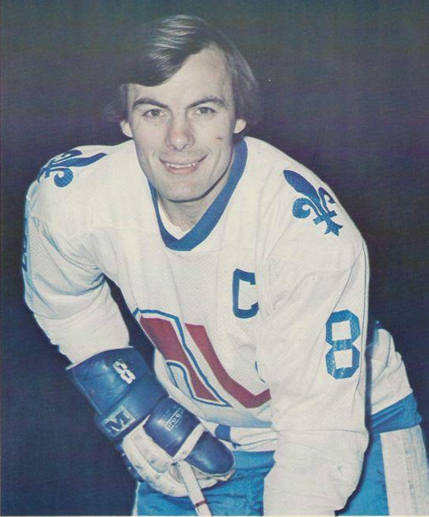
- Tardif in 1979
- Born: June 12, 1949 (age 77) Granby, Quebec, Canada
- Height: 6 ft 0 in (183 cm)
- Weight: 195 lb (88 kg; 13 st 13 lb)
- Position: Left wing
- Shot: Left
- Played for: Montreal Canadiens; Los Angeles Sharks; Michigan Stags; Quebec Nordiques
- National team: Canada
- NHL draft: 2nd overall, 1969; Montreal Canadiens
- Playing career: 1969–1983

Joseph Gérard Marquis Tardif (tahr-DEEF; born June 12, 1949) is a Canadian former professional ice hockey player. He played left winger in both the National Hockey League (NHL) and the World Hockey Association (WHA), principally for the Quebec Nordiques. He also represented Canada in the 1974 Summit Series. A dominant force in the WHA, Tardif had four consecutive seasons with 95+ points from 1975 to 1979; Tardif served as the captain of the Nordiques from 1975 to 1981, making him the first Nordique captain when the team entered the NHL. On April 4, 1978, he became the second professional hockey player to record 150 points in a season. In addition to his two Stanley Cup championships, he led the Nordiques to the Avco World Trophy to go along with winning the Gordie Howe Trophy for most valuable play in the WHA (1976, 1978).

Tardif finished as the all-time leading goal scorer in the WHA, scoring 316 goals in 446 games. In his professional career between the two leagues, Tardif scored 510 total goals.

== Early life ==
Born in Granby, Quebec, Tardif honed his skills for local school leagues in the winter, first playing as the age of five. He was recruited to play for Collège Laval, a private school, at the age of 14. A year later, Canadiens scout Ron Caron signed him to a deal with the farm team of the Montreal Junior Canadiens with the Thetford Mines Canadiens, where he met fellow future NHLers Rejean Houle and Gilbert Perreault.

Tardif played two seasons with the Montreal Junior Canadiens of the Quebec Major Junior Hockey League (1967-1969), winning the Memorial Cup in 1969 with Houle and Perreault on the team. The Montreal Canadiens, in the final year the National Hockey League team had the privilege to do so, invoked its right to select two French Canadian players first and second overall in the 1969 NHL Amateur Draft, with Tardif being selected second while Houle went first. Tardif spent most of the 1969–70 season with the American Hockey League (AHL) for the Montreal Voyageurs. He was one of the leading scorers on a team studded with future NHL stars, including Jude Drouin, Guy Charron, Guy Lapointe and Pete Mahovlich.

== Professional career ==
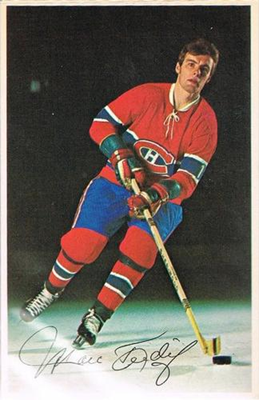
Tardif with the Montreal Canadiens, c. 1970

=== NHL years ===
Tardif played eighteen games of the 1969–70 season, with his first game on October 11 seeing him earn a ten-minute misconduct penalty for exchanging words with referee (and future WHA mainstay) Bill Friday. He recorded his first goal on October 19 against Bernie Parent of the Philadelphia Flyers. Tardif made the Canadiens for good the following season, playing credibly with 19 goals and 30 assists in 76 games. He logged three goals and an assist in the playoffs as the Canadiens won the Stanley Cup, defeating the Chicago Black Hawks in the Stanley Cup Final. In 1972, Tardif scored 31 goals, but troubles with head coach Scotty Bowman led to speculation about his future in Montreal by the beginning of 1973. He closed out his Montreal career with a second Stanley Cup championship in 1973, again over the Black Hawks, scoring the final goal of the decisive Game 6.

=== WHA years ===
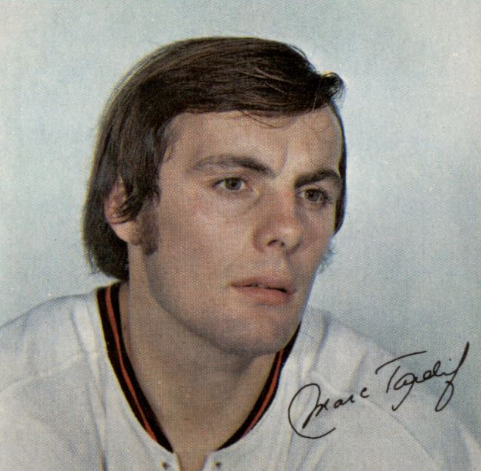
1973 photo of Tardif

On June 5, 1973, Tardif signed a three-year contract (speculated to be over $350,000) with the Los Angeles Sharks of the World Hockey Association, one that gave him what he wanted most: a long-term, no-trade, no-cut contract. Tardif specified later that he signed with the league rather than the team, as the way business was done with them involved the money being guaranteed but the full amount for the first year was deposited in a New York bank. Despite taking until his 10th game to score a goal, he was the Sharks' leading scorer that season, and was named to play for Team Canada in the 1974 Summit Series the following fall. The Sharks, however, finished with the league's poorest record, and moved to Detroit as the Michigan Stags in April 1974.

In July of that year, Tardif was selected to play on Team Canada for the 1974 Summit Series, which exclusively had WHA players play the Soviet Union prior to the start of the 1974 WHA season, although he had to miss the start of the series due to attending to his wife, who was due to give birth to their son. Joining the team in the Russia portion of the series, Tardif recorded one total point. In the Stags home opener on October 29, Tardif scored a goal that tied the game (which ended up with a win in overtime) but found himself booed, with team executives speculating that Michigan fans naturally get on "superstars". By December, there were rumblings of the franchise possibly folding or relocating. On December 7, Tardif, alongside Steve Sutherland, were traded to the Quebec Nordiques in exchange for Pierre Guité, Alain Caron, and Michael Rouleau (the Stags moved to Baltimore in January and folded after the season ended).

In Quebec, Tardif became one of the league's preeminent stars. He finished the 1974–75 WHA season with 50 goals and added a league-leading 10 goals in the playoffs on the road to the Avco Cup Final against the eventual champion Houston Aeros. On December 8, 1975, Tardif signed a contract with Quebec for ten years that was estimated to be worth $1.6 million. Tardif immediately became an icon for the French Canadian locale. The next season, he led the WHA in goals, assists and points by wide margins and became only the third professional player to score 70 goals in a single season (after Phil Esposito and Bobby Hull), while the Nordiques rampaged to 50 wins. Tardif's playoffs were cut short after he incurred serious head injuries in an attack during game two of the Quarterfinals matchup on April 11 against the Calgary Cowboys by enforcer Rick Jodzio, leading to one of the first cases where a hockey player was charged in a court of law for assault. Tardif did not skate for four months and dealt with dizzy spells for a time. So incensed were the Nordiques that they threatened to not play the rest of the playoffs unless the league agreed to their three demands (a lifetime suspension of Jodzio, the suspension of Calgary coach Joe Crozier and the resignation of WHA executive Bud Poile; Quebec ultimately played while Jodzio and Crozier were issued suspensions). On May 26, 1976, Tardif was awarded the league MVP. Tardif stated in later years that the brawl made him a "more careful player" and teammates stated he was never the same player.

Despite doubts that he might not be ready until January 1977, Tardif, now wearing a helmet, came back to form, playing 62 games while only being hindered by a knee injury. He was named the captain of the Nordiques, and recovered to post another 100-point campaign while leading the team to their only WHA championship, where he logged four goals and ten assists in the playoff run. The 1977–78 WHA season saw him record a historic season. On April 4, 1978, against the Edmonton Oilers in Quebec, Tardif had a four-point night (two goals, two assists), and his assist in the second period made him the second hockey player with 150 points in a season (after Esposito). It was a professional hockey record that was broken by Wayne Gretzky in the 1980-81 NHL season; Tardif received his second league MVP award. In the 1978 WHA playoffs First Round game versus Houston, Tardif scored the game-winning goal in overtime in game two for what ended up as the last overtime goal scored in the WHA postseason. On July 7, 1978, Tardif was awarded the MVP award by the league for the second time.

=== Retirement ===
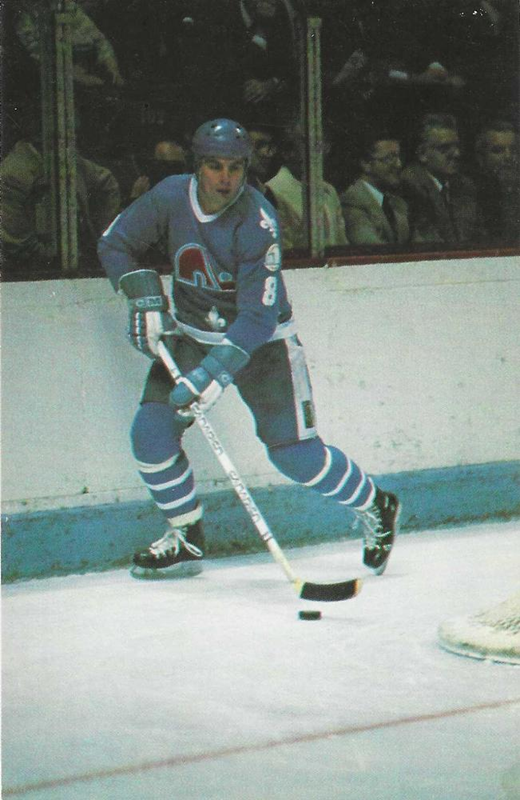
Tardif in 1982 postcard for the Quebec Nordiques

Tardif remained a star when the Nordiques joined the NHL after the WHA folded in 1979, serving as the team's first NHL captain. In the 1979–80 season, Tardif asked for a new contract that saw him make $250,000 a year that would run for three years. In 58 games played, he scored 33 goals while having 35 assists for a total of 68 points. The 1980–81 season saw him plagued by injuries, being the subject of trade rumors and disagreements with head coach Michel Bergeron. He scored 23 goals with 31 assists in 63 games. He had an All-Star caliber season in 1981, scoring 39 times with 31 assists in 75 games. In his final season, he played 76 games and scored 21 times with 31 assists. On December 18, 1982, Tardif recorded his 500th professional goal (184 in the NHL, 316 in the WHA) at home at 14:04 in the third period off Bob Sauvé of the Buffalo Sabres. His final games as a professional came in the 1983 Stanley Cup playoffs, where he recorded two penalty minutes as the Nordiques lost in four games.

Tardif was left unprotected for the 1983 waiver draft. He announced his retirement on October 3, 1983 before the draft so he would not be selected by another team. The Nordiques retired his No. 8 jersey in tribute to their first great scoring star on November 1. He finished his career scoring 316 goals and 350 assists for 666 points in the WHA, and 194 goals and 207 assists for 401 points in the NHL; in the two combined professional leagues, he scored 510 goals and 1,067 points. Despite his achievements, he has not been inducted into the Hockey Hall of Fame as of 2026.

== Personal life ==
Tardif had three children with his wife Lisette Poulin. As of 2019, Tardif split his time between La Belle Province and Florida. Soon after his retirement, he became involved in business as a partner at a GM dealership in Quebec. Currently, he owns car dealerships in Quebec City and Charlevoix, north of Quebec City and operates them with his son Marc-André. In 2020, Tardif tested positive for COVID-19 but made a full recovery.

== Awards and achievements ==
Award	Year(s)
Junior
Memorial Cup champion	1969
NHL
Stanley Cup champion	1971, 1973
NHL All-Star Game	1982
WHA
Avco World Trophy	1977
Gordie Howe Trophy	1976, 1978
First All-Star Team	1976, 1977, 1978
Second All-Star Team	1975
WHA All-Star Game	1974, 1975, 1976, 1977, 1978, 1979
Bill Hunter Trophy	1976, 1978

- First in WHA history in career goals, second in points, third in assists, and 20th in games played
- Inaugural member of the World Hockey Association Hall of Fame (2010)

== Career statistics ==
=== Regular season and playoffs ===
			Regular season					Playoffs
Season	Team	League	GP	G	A	Pts	PIM	GP	G	A	Pts	PIM
1966–67	Thetford Mines Canadiens	QJHL	40	36	44	80	89	11	13	13	26	2
1966–67	Thetford Mines Canadiens	MC	—	—	—	—	—	19	11	14	25	42
1967–68	Montreal Junior Canadiens	OHA-Jr.	54	32	34	66	62	11	3	9	12	18
1968–69	Montreal Junior Canadiens	OHA-Jr.	51	31	41	72	121	14	19	12	31	60
1968–69	Montreal Junior Canadiens	MC	—	—	—	—	—	7	6	9	15	16
1969–70	Montreal Voyageurs	AHL	45	27	31	58	70	8	3	6	9	29
1969–70	Montreal Canadiens	NHL	18	3	2	5	27	—	—	—	—	—
1970–71	Montreal Canadiens	NHL	76	19	30	49	133	20	3	1	4	20
1971–72	Montreal Canadiens	NHL	75	31	22	53	81	6	2	3	5	9
1972–73	Montreal Canadiens	NHL	76	25	25	50	48	14	6	6	12	6
1973–74	Los Angeles Sharks	WHA	75	40	30	70	47	—	—	—	—	—
1974–75	Michigan Stags	WHA	23	12	5	17	9	—	—	—	—	—
1974–75	Quebec Nordiques	WHA	53	38	34	72	70	15	10	11	21	10
1975–76	Quebec Nordiques	WHA	81	71	77	148	79	2	1	0	1	2
1976–77	Quebec Nordiques	WHA	62	49	60	109	65	12	4	10	14	8
1977–78	Quebec Nordiques	WHA	78	65	89	154	50	11	6	9	15	11
1978–79	Quebec Nordiques	WHA	74	41	55	96	98	4	6	2	8	4
1979–80	Quebec Nordiques	NHL	58	33	35	68	30	—	—	—	—	—
1980–81	Quebec Nordiques	NHL	63	23	31	54	35	5	1	3	4	2
1981–82	Quebec Nordiques	NHL	75	39	31	70	55	13	1	2	3	6
1982–83	Quebec Nordiques	NHL	76	21	31	52	34	4	0	0	0	2
NHL totals			517	194	207	401	443	62	13	15	28	75
WHA totals			446	316	350	666	418	44	27	32	59	35

=== International ===
Year	Team	Event	GP	G	A	Pts	PIM
1974	Canada	SS	5	0	2	2	10

Preceded by Réjean Houle	Montreal Canadiens first-round draft pick 1969	Succeeded by Ray Martyniuk
Preceded by Michel Parizeau	Quebec Nordiques captain 1976–81	Succeeded by Robbie Ftorek
