= Rene LeClerc =

Canadian ice hockey player (born 1947)

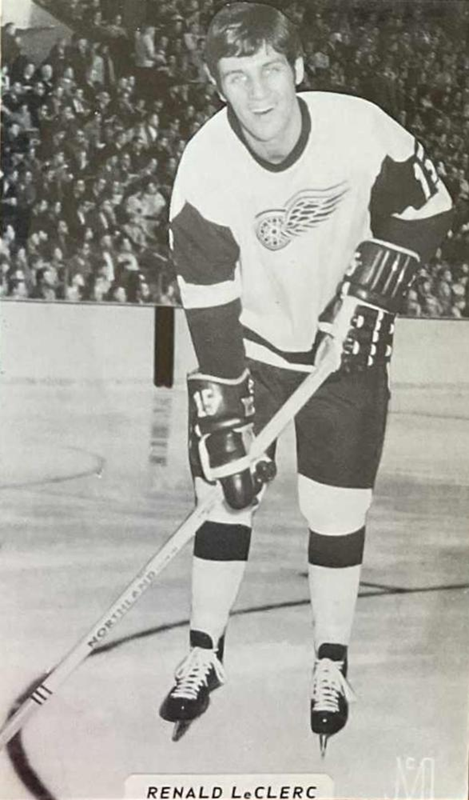
- Born: November 12, 1947 (age 78) Vanier, Quebec, Canada
- Height: 5 ft 11 in (180 cm)
- Weight: 165 lb (75 kg; 11 st 11 lb)
- Position: Right wing
- Shot: Right
- Played for: Detroit Red Wings; Quebec Nordiques; Indianapolis Racers
- NHL draft: 19th overall, 1964; Detroit Red Wings
- Playing career: 1968–1979

Rénald LeClerc (born November 12, 1947) is a Canadian retired professional ice hockey winger who played 87 games in the National Hockey League and 452 games in the World Hockey Association between 1968 and 1979. He played for the Detroit Red Wings, Quebec Nordiques and Indianapolis Racers. As a youth, he played in the 1960 Quebec International Pee-Wee Hockey Tournament with the junior Quebec Aces.

== Career statistics ==
=== Regular season and playoffs ===
			Regular season					Playoffs
Season	Team	League	GP	G	A	Pts	PIM	GP	G	A	Pts	PIM
1963–64	Hamilton Red Wings	OHA	3	0	0	0	0	—	—	—	—	—
1964–65	Hamilton Red Wings	OHA	5	0	0	0	0	—	—	—	—	—
1965–66	Hamilton Red Wings	OHA	21	4	5	9	24	—	—	—	—	—
1966–67	Hamilton Red Wings	OHA	48	17	27	44	89	17	10	12	22	43
1967–68	Hamilton Red Wings	OHA	54	31	42	73	119	11	10	5	15	19
1967–68	Fort Worth Wings	CHL	—	—	—	—	—	6	1	1	2	2
1968–69	Detroit Red Wings	NHL	43	2	3	5	62	—	—	—	—	—
1968–69	Fort Worth Wings	CHL	22	4	5	9	32	—	—	—	—	—
1969–70	Cleveland Barons	AHL	61	16	20	36	108	—	—	—	—	—
1969–70	Fort Worth Wings	CHL	9	1	2	3	27	—	—	—	—	—
1970–71	Detroit Red Wings	NHL	44	8	8	16	43	—	—	—	—	—
1970–71	Fort Worth Wings	CHL	23	8	14	22	28	—	—	—	—	—
1971–72	Tidewater Wings	AHL	31	6	6	12	51	—	—	—	—	—
1971–72	San Diego Gulls	WHL	28	6	7	13	39	—	—	—	—	—
1971–72	Fort Worth Wings	CHL	2	0	0	0	0	—	—	—	—	—
1972–73	Quebec Nordiques	WHA	67	24	28	52	111	—	—	—	—	—
1973–74	Quebec Nordiques	WHA	58	17	27	44	84	—	—	—	—	—
1974–75	Quebec Nordiques	WHA	72	18	32	50	85	14	7	7	14	41
1975–76	Quebec Nordiques	WHA	42	15	17	32	37	—	—	—	—	—
1975–76	Indianapolis Racers	WHA	40	18	21	39	52	7	2	3	5	7
1976–77	Indianapolis Racers	WHA	68	25	30	55	43	9	1	1	2	4
1977–78	Indianapolis Racers	WHA	60	12	15	27	31	—	—	—	—	—
1978–79	Indianapolis Racers	WHA	22	5	7	12	12	—	—	—	—	—
1978–79	Quebec Nordiques	WHA	23	0	0	0	8	4	0	0	0	0
WHA totals			452	134	177	311	463	34	10	11	21	52
NHL totals			87	10	11	21	105	—	—	—	—	—
