= 1969 Memorial Cup =

Canadian junior ice hockey championship

Tournament details
- Dates: May 1969
- Teams: 11

Final positions
- Champions: Montreal Jr. Canadiens (OHA) (2nd title)

The Memorial Cup trophy

The 1969 Memorial Cup was the 51st annual Memorial Cup competition, organized by the Canadian Amateur Hockey Association (CAHA) to determine the champion of junior A ice hockey. The George Richardson Memorial Trophy champions Montreal Jr. Canadiens of the Ontario Hockey Association in Eastern Canada competed against the Abbott Cup champions Regina Pats of the Saskatchewan Junior Hockey League in Western Canada. The best-of-seven series was held at the Montreal Forum in Montreal, Quebec and at the Regina Exhibition Stadium in Regina, Saskatchewan. Montreal won their second Memorial Cup, defeating Regina four games to none.

== Scores ==
- Game 1: Montreal 5-3 Regina
- Game 2: Montreal 7-2 Regina
- Game 3: Montreal 5-2 Regina
- Game 4: Montreal 8-6 Regina

== Winning roster ==
Players: Jean-Pierre Bordeleau, Guy Charron, Gary Connelly, Andre Dupont, Jocelyn Guevremont, Robert Guindon, Normand Gratton, Rejean Houle, Serge Lajeunesse, Robert Lalonde, Richard Lemieux, Rick Martin, Claude Moreau, Gilbert Perreault, Arthur Quoquochi, Jim Rutherford, Marc Tardif, Ted Tucker, Wayne Wood. Coach: Roger Bedard.

== National playoffs ==
Opening Round	Quarter-finals
BC	Victoria	2
AB	Lethbridge	4
AB	Lethbridge	1
SK	Regina	4
Western Canada
MB	Dauphin	4
NWO	Fort William	2
NWO	Fort William	3
NWO	Schreiber	1
Eastern Canada
NEO	Sudbury	0
QC	Sorel	4
QC	Sorel	4
EO	Hull	1
EO	Hull	4
AC	Fredericton	3

Semi-finals
SK	Regina	4
MB	Dauphin	3
SO	Montreal	3
QC	Sorel	1

Memorial Cup
SK	Regina	0
ON	Montreal	4

=== Additional interleague playdowns ===
Sorel Black Hawks defeated Port Alfred Nationale 3-games-to-none (Quebec SF)
Sorel Black Hawks defeated St. Jerome Alouettes 3-games-to-none (Quebec Final)

== League champions ==
Western Canada - Abbott Cup playdowns

British Columbia (BC)

- BCJHL: Victoria Cougars

Alberta (AB)

- AJHL: Lethbridge Sugar Kings

Saskatchewan (SK)

- SJHL: Regina Pats

Manitoba (MB)

- MJHL: Dauphin Kings

Northwestern Ontario (NWO)

- NWOJHL: Schreiber North Stars
- TBJHL: Fort William Westfort Hurricanes

Eastern Canada - George Richardson Memorial Trophy playdowns

Ontario (ON)

- Eastern Ontario (EO) - CJHL: Hull Beavers
- Northeastern Ontario (NEO) - NOJHA: Sudbury Wolves
- Southern Ontario (SO) - OHA: Montreal Junior Canadiens

Quebec (QC)

- LHJP: Sorel Black Hawks
- LHJSLS: Port Alfred Nationale
- LHJMM: St. Jerome Alouettes

Atlantic Canada (AC)

- MJAHL: Fredericton Canadiens
