= Bobby Guindon =

American baseball player (1943–2023)

- First baseman / Outfielder
- Born: September 4, 1943; Brookline, Massachusetts, U.S.
- Died: October 26, 2023 (aged 80); Venice, Florida, U.S.
- Batted: Left Threw: Left

MLB debut
- September 19, 1964, for the Boston Red Sox

Last MLB appearance
- September 27, 1964, for the Boston Red Sox

MLB statistics
- Batting average: .125
- Home runs: 0
- Runs batted in: 0
- Stats at Baseball Reference

Teams
- Boston Red Sox (1964)

Robert Joseph Guindon (September 4, 1943 – October 26, 2023) was an American professional baseball player. He played briefly in Major League Baseball (MLB) as a first baseman and outfielder for the Boston Red Sox during the 1964 season. Listed at 6 feet 2 inches (1.88 m) and 185 pounds (84 kg), he batted and threw left-handed.

== Biography ==
A native of Brookline, Massachusetts, Guindon attended The English High School, Boston. Sportswriter Peter Gammons recounted that Guindon hit a grand slam off of him during a 1961 high school game. Guindon signed with the Boston Red Sox organization in June 1961.

Guindon's career in Minor League Baseball spanned 10 seasons, from 1961 to 1970. He spent most of his career in the Red Sox farm system, while also playing in 31 games for the Seattle Angels in 1965 and playing his final two seasons in the St. Louis Cardinals farm system. While mainly used as a first baseman and left fielder, he also made 42 appearances as a pitcher, compiling a 13–7 win–loss record with a 2.49 earned run average (ERA).

During the 1964 season, Guindon briefly played for the major-league Red Sox. He was used as a pinch runner twice and as a pinch hitter once, and had one start each at first base and left field. He posted a .125 batting average (1-for-8), registering a double plus one walk.

Guindon died at his home in Venice, Florida, on October 25, 2023, at the age of 80.
