= Wayne Connelly =

Canadian ice hockey player

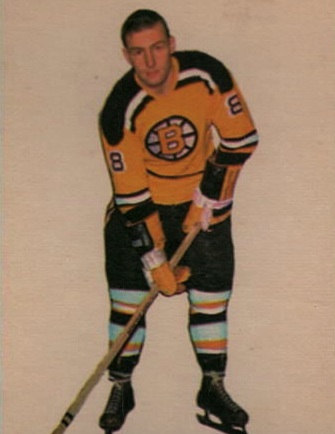
- Born: December 16, 1939 (age 86) Rouyn, Quebec, Canada
- Height: 5 ft 10 in (178 cm)
- Weight: 170 lb (77 kg; 12 st 2 lb)
- Position: Right wing
- Shot: Right
- Played for: Montreal Canadiens; Boston Bruins; Minnesota North Stars; Detroit Red Wings; St. Louis Blues; Vancouver Canucks; Minnesota Fighting Saints; Cleveland Crusaders; Calgary Cowboys; Edmonton Oilers
- Playing career: 1960–1977

Wayne Francis Connelly (born December 16, 1939) is a Canadian former ice hockey right winger who played in the National Hockey League with the Boston Bruins, Montreal Canadiens, Minnesota North Stars, Detroit Red Wings, St. Louis Blues, and Vancouver Canucks and finished his career in the World Hockey Association (WHA). Connelly was born in Rouyn, Quebec, and grew up in Kirkland Lake, Ontario.

== Playing career ==
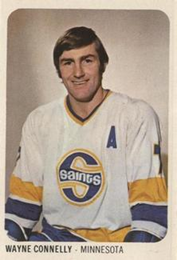
1974-75 card of Wayne Connelly for Minnesota Fighting Saints

Connelly played a total of 543 games in the NHL with 133 goals and 174 assists for a total of 307 points. In addition, he played 366 games in the WHA for the Minnesota Fighting Saints, Cleveland Crusaders, Calgary Cowboys, and Edmonton Oilers with 167 goals and 162 assists for 329 points.

Connelly won the Red Tilson Award in 1959–60 as the Ontario Hockey League's most outstanding player while with the Peterborough Petes. Connelly scored 235 points in 4 seasons with the Petes (1956–1960). On November 29, 1961, Connelly scored his first NHL goal in Boston's 7-4 loss to the Chicago Blackhawks. It occurred at Chicago Stadium.

On October 19, 1966, Bobby Orr recorded his first NHL point when he assisted on a powerplay goal by Connelly in Boston's 6–2 win over the Detroit Red Wings. In the NHL's first year of expansion, 1967–68, Connelly led the Minnesota North Stars with 35 goals and 21 assists and received the Hockey News West Player of the Year award. On April 9, 1968, Connelly became the first player to score a goal on a penalty shot in the NHL playoffs when he beat Los Angeles's Terry Sawchuk in a 7–5 victory for his Minnesota North Stars.

He joined the Minnesota Fighting Saints of the upstart World Hockey Association in 1972. He played with the team for four seasons and in 291 games, he scored 144 goals and recorded 283 total points, which were both franchise records. He was traded to the Cleveland Crusaders in the middle of the 1975-76 season before he played sparingly for both the Calgary Cowboys and Edmonton Oilers in the 1976-77 season, after which he retired. In 909 total professional games, he recorded 300 goals with 636 points. He played in 36 WHA playoff games and recorded 16 goals with 15 assists while playing in the Stanley Cup playoffs for 24 games with 11 goals and 7 assists.

== Personal life ==
Connelly and his wife Reg have two children, Ann and Stephen. He lives on Lake Kenogami located near Kirkland Lake in Northern Ontario.

== Statistics ==
			Regular season					Playoffs
Season	Team	League	GP	G	A	Pts	PIM	GP	G	A	Pts	PIM
1955–56	Kitchener Canucks	OHA	9	0	1	1	2	8	0	0	0	0
1956–57	Peterborough Petes	OHA	52	19	7	26	83	—	—	—	—	—
1957–58	Peterborough Petes	OHA	52	18	19	37	32	5	0	1	1	6
1958–59	Peterborough Petes	OHA	54	36	54	90	46	19	6	13	19	38
1958–59	Peterborough Petes	M-Cup	—	—	—	—	—	12	10	5	15	9
1959–60	Peterborough Petes	OHA	47	48	34	82	47	12	10	9	19	4
1959–60	Montreal Royals	EPHL	—	—	—	—	—	8	6	4	10	4
1960–61	Montreal Canadiens	NHL	3	0	0	0	0	—	—	—	—	—
1960–61	Montreal Royals	EPHL	64	28	21	49	36	—	—	—	—	—
1961–62	Hull-Ottawa Canadiens	EPHL	7	2	3	5	4	—	—	—	—	—
1961–62	Boston Bruins	NHL	61	8	12	20	34	—	—	—	—	—
1962–63	Boston Bruins	NHL	18	2	6	8	2	—	—	—	—	—
1962–63	Kingston Frontenacs	EPHL	34	10	24	34	19	5	1	4	5	2
1963–64	Boston Bruins	NHL	26	2	3	5	12	—	—	—	—	—
1963–64	San Francisco Seals	WHL	33	12	18	30	10	11	2	3	5	8
1964–65	San Francisco Seals	WHL	70	36	36	72	51	—	—	—	—	—
1965–66	San Francisco Seals	WHL	72	45	41	86	14	7	4	4	8	2
1966–67	Boston Bruins	NHL	64	13	17	30	12	—	—	—	—	—
1967–68	Minnesota North Stars	NHL	74	35	21	56	40	14	8	3	11	2
1968–69	Minnesota North Stars	NHL	55	14	16	30	11	—	—	—	—	—
1968–69	Detroit Red Wings	NHL	19	4	9	13	0	—	—	—	—	—
1969–70	Detroit Red Wings	NHL	76	23	36	59	10	4	1	3	4	2
1970–71	Detroit Red Wings	NHL	51	8	13	21	12	—	—	—	—	—
1970–71	St. Louis Blues	NHL	28	5	16	21	9	6	2	1	3	0
1971–72	St. Louis Blues	NHL	15	5	5	10	2	—	—	—	—	—
1971–72	Vancouver Canucks	NHL	53	14	20	34	12	—	—	—	—	—
1972–73	Minnesota Fighting Saints	WHA	78	40	30	70	16	5	1	3	4	0
1973–74	Minnesota Fighting Saints	WHA	78	42	53	95	16	11	6	7	13	4
1974–75	Minnesota Fighting Saints	WHA	76	38	33	71	16	12	8	4	12	10
1975–76	Minnesota Fighting Saints	WHA	59	24	23	47	19	—	—	—	—	—
1975–76	Cleveland Crusaders	WHA	12	5	2	7	4	3	1	0	1	2
1976–77	Calgary Cowboys	WHA	25	5	6	11	4	—	—	—	—	—
1976–77	Edmonton Oilers	WHA	38	13	15	28	18	5	0	1	1	0
WHA totals			366	167	162	329	93	36	16	15	31	16
NHL totals			543	133	174	307	156	24	11	7	18	4
