= Wayne Carleton =

Canadian ice hockey player

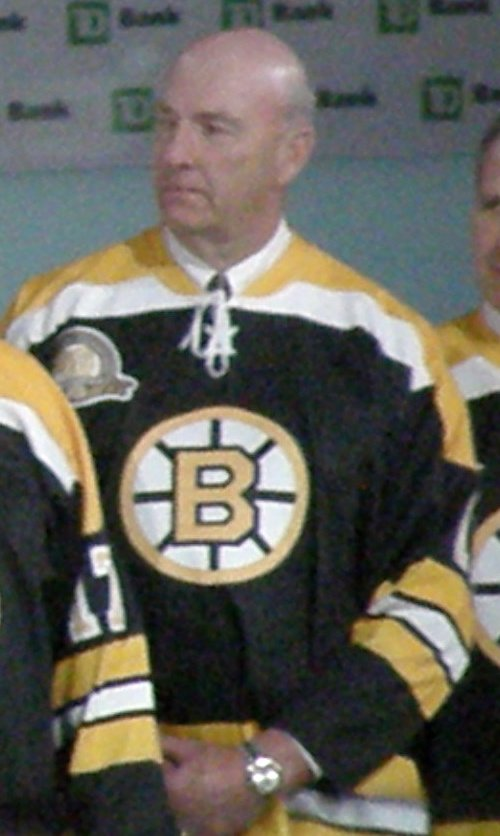
- Wayne Carleton at a 1970s-era Bruins reunion in 2010
- Born: August 4, 1946 (age 79) Sudbury, Ontario, Canada
- Height: 6 ft 3 in (191 cm)
- Weight: 212 lb (96 kg; 15 st 2 lb)
- Position: Left wing
- Shot: Left
- Played for: Toronto Maple Leafs; Boston Bruins; California Golden Seals; Ottawa Nationals; Toronto Toros; New England Whalers; Edmonton Oilers; Birmingham Bulls
- Playing career: 1966–1977

Kenneth Wayne "Swoop" Carleton (born August 4, 1946) is a Canadian former professional ice hockey player. Carleton played in the National Hockey League (NHL) and the World Hockey Association (WHA) in the 1960s and 1970s. He was a member of the Stanley Cup-winning 1969–70 Boston Bruins team.

== Playing career ==
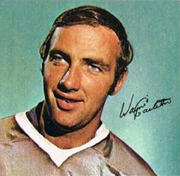
Wayne Carleton card, 1974

Carleton played junior hockey for the Toronto Marlboros, from 1961–62 to 1965–66. During this period, with Carleton playing a starring role, the Marlboros won the 1964 Memorial Cup.

Carleton was called up by the Toronto Maple Leafs, for 2 games, during the 1965–66 NHL season. He earned a regular spot with the Leafs the following season, and he later played with the Boston Bruins and California Golden Seals.

Carleton was a member of one Stanley Cup championship team, the 1969–70 Bruins. He was on the ice as the left wing on Derek Sanderson's line when Bobby Orr scored his famous Cup-clinching goal in the fourth game of the 1970 Stanley Cup Finals. His best NHL season came in 1970-71 when he scored 46 points 22 goals and 24 assists.

Carleton played in the NHL until the 1971–72 NHL season he then moved to the WHA and played for the Ottawa Nationals, Toronto Toros, Edmonton Oilers, Birmingham Bulls, and New England Whalers. Carlton would see some great success in the WHA as in the 1972-73 season he would have a 91 point season with 42 goals and 49 assists. This would lead to him being named 1973 WHA All-Star Game also being the named the MVP of the game. Then being named a 3rd team all star at the end of the season. Carleton would continue to put up good numbers as the following season would be his statistical best with 92 points 37 goals 55 assists in 78 games. Once again playing in the WHA all star game and being named a second team all star at the end of the season. He would make the all star game one more time in 1976. But his numbers would start to decline. He would leave the WHA in 1976 playing a season and a half in the OHA with the Barrie Flyers putting where he would put up good numbers but would ultimately retire after the 1978.

== Awards and achievements ==
- Stanley Cup champion (1970)
- Memorial Cup champion (1964)
- played in the WHA all star game in 1973, 1974 and 1976
- WHA second team all star 1974
- WHA third team all star 1973

== Career statistics ==
=== Regular season and playoffs ===
			Regular season					Playoffs
Season	Team	League	GP	G	A	Pts	PIM	GP	G	A	Pts	PIM
1961–62	Unionville Seaforths	OHA	15	9	3	12	—	—	—	—	—	—
1961–62	Toronto Marlboros	OHA-Jr	16	5	8	13	5	12	2	4	6	4
1962–63	Toronto Marlboros	OHA-Jr	38	27	24	51	11	12	6	4	10	21
1963–64	Toronto Marlboros	OHA-Jr.	54	42	22	64	26	5	3	2	5	0
1964–65	Toronto Marlboros	OHA-Jr.	15	13	10	23	12	14	5	6	11	17
1965–66	Toronto Marlboros	OHA-Jr.	16	9	5	14	24	14	9	6	15	28
1965–66	Toronto Maple Leafs	NHL	2	0	1	1	0	—	—	—	—	—
1965–66	Tulsa Oilers	CHL	—	—	—	—	—	6	3	4	7	0
1966–67	Toronto Maple Leafs	NHL	5	1	0	1	14	—	—	—	—	—
1966–67	Tulsa Oilers	CHL	52	17	15	32	48	—	—	—	—	—
1966–67	Rochester Americans	AHL	13	5	5	10	8	13	5	2	7	31
1967–68	Toronto Maple Leafs	NHL	65	8	11	19	34	—	—	—	—	—
1968–69	Toronto Maple Leafs	NHL	12	1	3	4	6	—	—	—	—	—
1968–69	Rochester Americans	AHL	13	5	3	8	0	—	—	—	—	—
1968–69	Phoenix Roadrunners	WHL	32	16	13	29	18	—	—	—	—	—
1969–70	Toronto Maple Leafs	NHL	7	0	1	1	6	—	—	—	—	—
1969–70	Phoenix Roadrunners	WHL	6	1	3	4	0	—	—	—	—	—
1969–70	Boston Bruins	NHL	42	6	19	25	23	14	4	2	6	14
1970–71	Boston Bruins	NHL	69	22	24	46	44	4	0	0	0	0
1971–72	California Golden Seals	NHL	76	17	14	31	45	—	—	—	—	—
1972–73	Ottawa Nationals	WHA	75	42	49	91	42	3	3	3	6	4
1973–74	Toronto Toros	WHA	78	37	55	92	31	12	2	12	14	4
1974–75	New England Whalers	WHA	73	35	39	74	50	6	2	5	7	14
1975–76	New England Whalers	WHA	35	12	21	33	6	—	—	—	—	—
1975–76	Edmonton Oilers	WHA	26	5	16	21	6	4	1	1	2	2
1976–77	Birmingham Bulls	WHA	3	1	0	1	0	—	—	—	—	—
1976–77	Barrie Flyers	OHA-Sr	20	7	20	27	6	—	—	—	—	—
1977–78	Barrie Flyers	OHA-Sr	35	21	23	44	27	—	—	—	—	—
WHA totals			290	132	180	312	135	25	8	21	29	24
NHL totals			278	55	73	128	172	18	4	2	6	14
