= Lou Nistico =

Canadian ice hockey player (1953–2020)

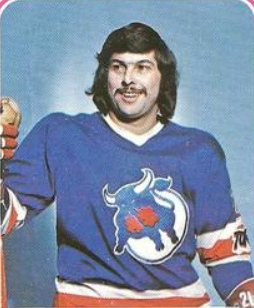
- Nistico in 1975 card
- Born: January 25, 1953 Thunder Bay, Ontario, Canada
- Died: November 27, 2020 (aged 67) Hawkesbury, Ontario, Canada
- Height: 5 ft 7 in (170 cm)
- Weight: 180 lb (82 kg; 12 st 12 lb)
- Position: Left wing
- Shot: Left
- Played for: Toronto Toros; Birmingham Bulls; Colorado Rockies
- NHL draft: 105th overall, 1973; Minnesota North Stars
- WHA draft: 56th overall, 1973; Toronto Toros
- Playing career: 1973–1979

Louis Charles Nistico (January 25, 1953 – November 27, 2020) was a Canadian professional ice hockey player who played 3 games in the National Hockey League and 186 games in the World Hockey Association. He played with the Colorado Rockies, Toronto Toros, and Birmingham Bulls. Lou later got back into hockey at the Jr.A level as a GM and Coach in the CJHL, now CCHL. He won championships in Ottawa with the Junior Senators and was also the general manager for the Kanata Stallions and assistant general manager for the Hawkesbury Hawks.

He died on 27 November 2020, at the age of 67.

== Regular season and playoffs ==
			Regular season					Playoffs
Season	Team	League	GP	G	A	Pts	PIM	GP	G	A	Pts	PIM
1967–68	Westfort Hurricanes	TBJHL	22	1	5	6	93	—	—	—	—	—
1967–68	Westfort Hurricanes	M-Cup	—	—	—	—	—	11	0	1	1	4
1968–69	Westfort Hurricanes	TBJHL	36	23	23	46	86	—	—	—	—	—
1968–69	Westfort Hurricanes	M-Cup	—	—	—	—	—	6	2	4	6	13
1969–70	Westfort Hurricanes	TBJHL	23	11	19	30	164	12	7	9	16	15
1969–70	Westfort Hurricanes	M-Cup	—	—	—	—	—	12	8	7	15	36
1970–71	London Knights	OHA	45	11	11	22	119	4	0	0	0	29
1971–72	London Knights	OHA	62	22	30	52	193	7	3	7	10	36
1972–73	London Knights	OHA	65	31	64	95	108	—	—	—	—	—
1973–74	Toronto Toros	WHA	13	1	3	4	14	—	—	—	—	—
1973–74	Jacksonville Barons	AHL	51	12	24	36	109	—	—	—	—	—
1974–75	Toronto Toros	WHA	29	11	11	22	75	6	6	1	7	19
1974–75	Mohawk Valley Comets	NAHL	42	21	27	48	103	—	—	—	—	—
1975–76	Toronto Toros	WHA	65	12	22	34	120	—	—	—	—	—
1975–76	Buffalo Norsemen	NAHL	10	9	5	14	49	—	—	—	—	—
1976–77	Birmingham Bulls	WHA	79	20	36	56	166	—	—	—	—	—
1977–78	Colorado Rockies	NHL	3	0	0	0	0	—	—	—	—	—
1977–78	Phoenix Roadrunners	CHL	4	0	0	0	0	—	—	—	—	—
1977–78	Brantford Alexanders	OHA Sr	27	19	16	35	85	—	—	—	—	—
1978–79	Welland Cougars	OHA Sr	40	29	30	59	—	—	—	—	—	—
WHA totals			186	44	72	116	375	6	6	1	7	19
NHL totals			3	0	0	0	0	—	—	—	—	—
