= Michel Parizeau =

Canadian ice hockey player

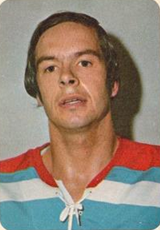
- Born: April 9, 1948 (age 77) Montreal, Quebec, Canada
- Height: 5 ft 10 in (178 cm)
- Weight: 160 lb (73 kg; 11 st 6 lb)
- Position: Left wing
- Shot: Left
- Played for: St. Louis Blues; Philadelphia Flyers; Quebec Nordiques; Indianapolis Racers; Cincinnati Stingers
- NHL draft: 10th overall, 1965; New York Rangers
- Playing career: 1968–1979

Michel Gérard Parizeau (born April 9, 1948) is a Canadian former professional ice hockey left winger and head coach who played two seasons in the National Hockey League (NHL) for the St. Louis Blues and Philadelphia Flyers.

Parizeau also played seven seasons in the World Hockey Association (WHA) for the Quebec Nordiques, Indianapolis Racers and Cincinnati Stingers. He is one of four players to have played 500 games in the league.

== Career statistics ==
			Regular season					Playoffs
Season	Team	League	GP	G	A	Pts	PIM	GP	G	A	Pts	PIM
1964–65	Montréal Métros	MMJHL	—	—	—	—	—	—	—	—	—	—
1965–66	Drummondville Rangers	QJHL	—	—	—	—	—	—	—	—	—	—
1966–67	Drummondville Rangers	QJHL	45	23	45	68	51	3	2	1	3	0
1967–68	Drummondville Rangers	QJHL	50	29	62	91	62	10	7	12	19	2
1967–68	Drummondville Rangers	M-Cup	—	—	—	—	—	4	2	4	6	0
1968–69	Omaha Knights	CHL	71	22	39	61	20	7	1	3	4	0
1969–70	Omaha Knights	CHL	71	13	16	29	30	12	7	3	10	9
1970–71	Omaha Knights	CHL	72	35	49	84	43	11	4	7	11	11
1971–72	St. Louis Blues	NHL	21	1	2	3	8	—	—	—	—	—
1971–72	Philadelphia Flyers	NHL	37	2	12	14	10	—	—	—	—	—
1972–73	Quebec Nordiques	WHA	75	25	48	73	50	—	—	—	—	—
1973–74	Quebec Nordiques	WHA	78	26	34	60	39	—	—	—	—	—
1974–75	Quebec Nordiques	WHA	78	28	46	74	69	15	2	4	6	10
1975–76	Quebec Nordiques	WHA	58	12	27	39	22	—	—	—	—	—
1975–76	Indianapolis Racers	WHA	23	13	15	28	20	7	4	4	8	6
1976–77	Indianapolis Racers	WHA	75	18	37	55	39	8	3	6	9	8
1977–78	Indianapolis Racers	WHA	70	13	27	40	47	—	—	—	—	—
1978–79	Indianapolis Racers	WHA	22	4	9	13	4	—	—	—	—	—
1978–79	Cincinnati Stingers	WHA	30	3	9	12	28	3	1	0	1	0
CHL totals			214	70	104	174	93	30	12	13	25	20
NHL totals			58	3	14	17	18	—	—	—	—	—
WHA totals			509	142	252	394	318	33	10	14	24	24

Preceded by Jean-Guy Gendron	Quebec Nordiques captain 1974-76	Succeeded by Marc Tardif
