= Ernie Wakely =

Canadian ice hockey player (born 1940)

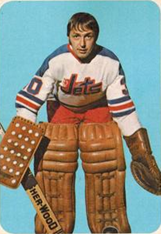
- Born: November 27, 1940 (age 85) Flin Flon, Manitoba, Canada
- Height: 5 ft 11 in (180 cm)
- Weight: 160 lb (73 kg; 11 st 6 lb)
- Position: Goaltender
- Caught: Left
- Played for: Montreal Canadiens; St. Louis Blues; Winnipeg Jets; San Diego Mariners; Cincinnati Stingers; Houston Aeros; Birmingham Bulls
- Playing career: 1959–1979

Ernest Alfred Linton Wakely (born November 27, 1940) is a Canadian former professional ice hockey goaltender. He played 113 games in the National Hockey League (NHL) from 1962 to 1972, and 334 games in the World Hockey Association from 1972 to 1979.

== Career ==
Wakely was a goaltender in the National Hockey League (NHL) for the Montreal Canadiens and St. Louis Blues. He also played for the Quebec Aces, the Cleveland Barons (AHL), Winnipeg Jets, San Diego Mariners, Cincinnati Stingers, Houston Aeros, Houston Apollos, and Birmingham Bulls of the World Hockey Association. Wakely was goaltender for the 1958–59 Memorial Cup-winning Winnipeg Braves of the MJHL.

In the 1969–70 NHL season Wakely took over in St. Louis for Glenn Hall. Wakely appeared in 30 games, won 12, and recorded an NHL league-leading goals against average of 2.11 in leading the Blues to the Stanley Cup Final against the Boston Bruins. Although Wakely did not start the first game of the Final, he replaced Jacques Plante early in the game after Plante was injured. Wakely played well through the second period, but Boston prevailed in that game 6–1 and swept the Blues in four straight games to win the Stanley Cup.

The following season, Wakely played in 51 games, won 20, and posted a 2.79 GAA. Two years later, he played with the Winnipeg Jets and former Chicago Black Hawks star Bobby Hull in the World Hockey Association. No other goalie played more games in the WHA and his 16 shutouts are also a WHA career record.

== Career statistics ==
=== Regular season and playoffs ===
			Regular season									Playoffs
Season	Team	League	GP	W	L	T	MIN	GA	SO	GAA	SV%	GP	W	L	MIN	GA	SO	GAA	SV%
1957–58	Winnipeg Braves	MJHL	27	12	14	1	1640	121	1	4.48	—	5	2	3	300	20	0	4.00	—
1958–59	Winnipeg Braves	MJHL	30	22	7	1	1810	107	1	3.54	—	8	7	1	490	22	1	2.69	—
1958–59	Winnipeg Braves	M-Cup	—	—	—	—	—	—	—	—	—	16	12	4	960	45	1	2.81	—
1959–60	Winnipeg Braves	MJHL	27	15	11	1	1640	99	1	3.62	—	4	1	3	250	15	0	3.50	—
1959–60	Winnipeg Warriors	WHL	4	1	3	0	240	16	0	4.00	—	—	—	—	—	—	—	—	—
1960–61	Winnipeg Braves	MJHL	31	18	13	0	1860	111	2	3.57	—	3	0	3	210	14	0	4.00	—
1960–61	Winnipeg Warriors	WHL	9	4	5	0	540	43	0	4.77	—	—	—	—	—	—	—	—	—
1961–62	Hull-Ottawa Canadiens	EPHL	2	1	0	1	120	4	0	2.00	—	—	—	—	—	—	—	—	—
1961–62	Kingston Frontenacs	EPHL	3	2	1	0	180	10	0	3.33	—	—	—	—	—	—	—	—	—
1961–62	North Bay Trappers	EPHL	6	1	4	1	360	18	0	3.00	—	—	—	—	—	—	—	—	—
1962–63	Montreal Canadiens	NHL	1	1	0	0	60	3	0	3.00	.897	—	—	—	—	—	—	—	—
1962–63	Hull-Ottawa Canadiens	EPHL	41	26	12	3	2460	122	2	2.97	—	—	—	—	—	—	—	—	—
1962–63	Spokane Comets	WHL	3	1	2	0	180	16	0	5.33	—	—	—	—	—	—	—	—	—
1963–64	Quebec Aces	AHL	8	3	5	0	480	33	0	4.12	—	—	—	—	—	—	—	—	—
1963–64	Omaha Knights	CPHL	59	38	16	5	3540	173	2	2.93	—	10	8	2	600	19	3	1.90	—
1964–65	Omaha Knights	CPHL	15	11	3	1	900	40	0	2.67	—	—	—	—	—	—	—	—	—
1964–65	Cleveland Barons	AHL	10	2	8	0	600	49	0	4.90	—	—	—	—	—	—	—	—	—
1964–65	Quebec Aces	AHL	20	9	10	1	1228	77	1	3.76	—	4	1	3	240	17	0	4.25	—
1965–66	Cleveland Barons	AHL	1	0	0	0	20	1	0	3.00	—	—	—	—	—	—	—	—	—
1965–66	Quebec Aces	AHL	1	0	1	0	60	6	0	6.00	—	—	—	—	—	—	—	—	—
1965–66	Seattle Totems	AHL	27	12	14	1	1617	83	2	3.08	—	—	—	—	—	—	—	—	—
1966–67	Cleveland Barons	AHL	70	36	25	9	4187	216	0	3.10	—	5	2	3	301	10	0	1.99	—
1967–68	Houston Apollos	CPHL	57	24	21	10	3312	163	1	2.95	—	—	—	—	—	—	—	—	—
1968–69	Montreal Canadiens	NHL	1	0	1	0	60	4	0	4.00	.852	—	—	—	—	—	—	—	—
1968–69	Cleveland Barons	AHL	65	25	28	11	3852		1	3.27	—	5	2	3	304	20	0	3.95	—
1969–70	St. Louis Blues	NHL	30	12	9	4	1650	58	4	2.11	.930	4	0	4	215	17	0	4.74	.877
1970–71	St. Louis Blues	NHL	51	20	14	11	2858	133	3	2.79	.902	3	2	1	178	7	1	2.36	.919
1971–72	St. Louis Blues	NHL	30	8	18	2	1605	91	1	3.40	.894	3	0	1	113	13	0	6.93	.800
1972–73	Winnipeg Jets	WHA	49	26	19	3	2889	152	2	3.16	.892	7	4	3	420	22	2	3.14	.895
1973–74	Winnipeg Jets	WHA	37	15	18	4	2254	123	3	3.27	.896	—	—	—	—	—	—	—	—
1974–75	Winnipeg Jets	WHA	6	3	3	0	355	16	1	2.70	.925	—	—	—	—	—	—	—	—
1974–75	San Diego Mariners	WHA	35	20	12	2	2062	115	2	3.35	.895	10	4	6	520	39	0	4.50	—
1975–76	San Diego Mariners	WHA	67	35	27	4	3824	208	3	3.26	.895	11	5	6	640	39	0	3.66	—
1976–77	San Diego Mariners	WHA	46	22	18	3	2506	129	3	3.09	.896	3	2	1	160	9	0	3.38	.880
1977–78	Cincinnati Stingers	WHA	6	0	5	0	311	26	0	5.02	.822	—	—	—	—	—	—	—	—
1977–78	Houston Aeros	WHA	51	28	18	4	3070	166	2	3.24	.897	—	—	—	—	—	—	—	—
1978–79	Birmingham Bulls	WHA	37	15	17	1	2060	129	0	3.76	.880	—	—	—	—	—	—	—	—
1978–79	Phoenix Roadrunners	PHL	1	1	0	0	60	4	0	4.00	—	—	—	—	—	—	—	—	—
WHA totals			334	164	137	21	19,335	1064	16	3.30	.893	31	15	16	1740	109	2	3.76	—
NHL totals			113	41	42	17	6234	289	8	2.78	.907	10	2	6	509	37	1	4.36	.872

== Awards and achievements ==
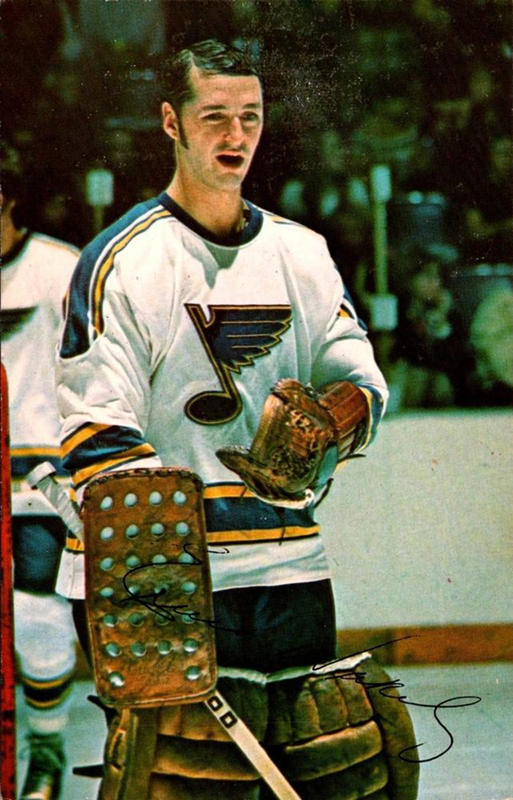
1971 postcard of Wakely for St. Louis Blues

- Turnbull Cup (MJHL) Championship (1959)
- Memorial Cup Championship (1959)
- MJHL Top Goaltender (1961)
- CPHL Championship (1964)
- Engraved on the Stanley Cup in 1965, and 1968 with Montreal (he only dressed for two games in playoffs and did not play)
- Played in 1971 NHL All-Star Game
- Played in 1972–73 WHA All-Star Game and 1973–74 WHA All-Star Game
- Honoured Member of the Manitoba Hockey Hall of Fame
- Inaugural member of the World Hockey Association Hall of Fame (2010)
