= Réjean Houle =

Canadian ice hockey player (born 1949)

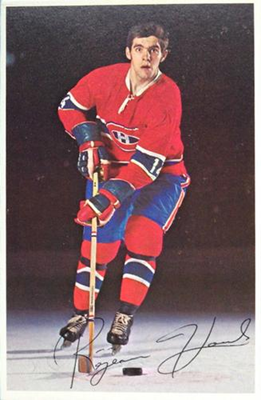
- Born: October 25, 1949 (age 76) Rouyn, Quebec, Canada
- Height: 5 ft 11 in (180 cm)
- Weight: 165 lb (75 kg; 11 st 11 lb)
- Position: Right wing
- Shot: Left
- Played for: Montreal Canadiens (NHL); Quebec Nordiques (WHA)
- National team: Canada
- NHL draft: 1st overall, 1969; Montreal Canadiens
- Playing career: 1969–1983

Réjean Houle (born October 25, 1949) is a Canadian former professional ice hockey forward. He played in the National Hockey League with the Montreal Canadiens from 1969 to 1973 and again from 1976 to 1983, and in the World Hockey Association with the Quebec Nordiques from 1973 to 1976. After his playing career he served as the general manager of the Canadiens from 1995 to 2000, and is notable for trading goaltender Patrick Roy early in his tenure. Selected first overall in the 1969 NHL Amateur Draft by Montreal, Houle won the Stanley Cup with the team five times during his career.

== Playing career ==
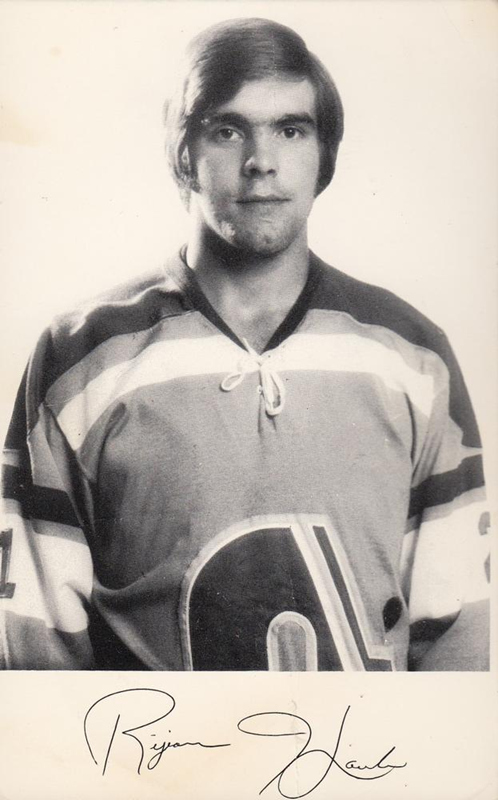
1974 card of Houle for the Quebec Nordiques

Drafted as the first pick overall in the 1969 NHL Amateur Draft by the Montreal Canadiens, Houle played for the Canadiens from 1970 to 1973 and from 1976 to 1983. He won five Stanley Cup championships with the Canadiens. In between his NHL stints, he played for the Quebec Nordiques of the World Hockey Association (WHA).

== Management career ==
After retiring as a player, Houle became an executive with Molson, one of Canada's leading breweries and the then-owner of the Montreal Canadiens organization. A disastrous start to the 1995–96 season resulted in team president Ronald Corey conducting a "house cleaning" with the firing of head coach Jacques Demers and general manager Serge Savard. The team saw Houle, with his business background and history with the team, as the most viable replacement candidate for Savard, while Mario Tremblay was appointed the new head coach.

Houle then served as general manager of the Canadiens from 1995 to 2000, though his tenure was largely viewed as a disaster by many fans. Houle had held his role for just six weeks, when Tremblay kept Patrick Roy in net for 9 goals during a 11-1 drubbing to the Detroit Red Wings; Roy told Ronald Corey that he would not play for the Canadiens again so Houle initiated the infamous trade that sent Roy and Mike Keane to the Colorado Avalanche in exchange for Jocelyn Thibault, Martin Ručinský and Andrei Kovalenko. Following this trade, he dealt-away marquee players including Mark Recchi, Vincent Damphousse and Pierre Turgeon in exchange for players of little value to the team. He was also criticized for frequently trading with non-contending teams, being unable to land widely coveted free agents and for signing marginal players to inflated contracts.

Houle's drafting was considered even worse, however, as he was criticized for selecting players such as Matt Higgins, Jason Ward, Eric Chouinard and Marcel Hossa, the younger brother of then-rising talent Marián Hossa, with his first round selections. Houle was fired from his post two months into the 2000–01 season.

Houle also served as president of the Canadiens Alumni Association for 36 years over two stints between 1984 and 2025, relinquishing the role while he served as GM of the Canadiens.

== Personal life ==
Houle and his wife Micheline have three children; two sons, Jean-François, who is the head coach of the NCAA's Clarkson University Golden Knights and Sylvain, as well as a daughter, Annie.

== Awards ==
- 1968–69: Eddie Powers Memorial Trophy

== Career statistics ==
=== Regular season and playoffs ===
			Regular season					Playoffs
Season	Team	League	GP	G	A	Pts	PIM	GP	G	A	Pts	PIM
1966–67	Thetford Mines Canadiens	QJHL	43	30	30	60	80	11	10	12	22	27
1966–67	Thetford Mines Canadiens	M-Cup	—	—	—	—	—	19	14	16	30	12
1967–68	Montreal Jr. Canadiens	OHA	45	27	38	65	102	11	12	8	20	10
1968–69	Montreal Jr. Canadiens	OHA	54	53	55	108	76	14	13	10	23	13
1968–69	Montreal Jr. Canadiens	M-Cup	—	—	—	—	—	8	6	2	8	20
1969–70	Montreal Canadiens	NHL	9	0	1	1	0	—	—	—	—	—
1969–70	Montreal Voyageurs	AHL	27	9	16	25	23	8	3	2	5	4
1970–71	Montreal Canadiens	NHL	66	10	9	19	28	20	2	5	7	20
1971–72	Montreal Canadiens	NHL	77	11	17	28	21	6	0	0	0	2
1972–73	Montreal Canadiens	NHL	72	13	35	48	36	17	3	6	9	0
1973–74	Quebec Nordiques	WHA	69	27	35	62	17	—	—	—	—	—
1974–75	Quebec Nordiques	WHA	64	40	52	92	37	15	10	6	16	2
1975–76	Quebec Nordiques	WHA	81	51	52	103	61	5	2	0	2	8
1976–77	Montreal Canadiens	NHL	65	22	30	52	24	6	0	1	1	4
1977–78	Montreal Canadiens	NHL	76	30	28	58	50	15	3	8	11	14
1978–79	Montreal Canadiens	NHL	66	17	34	51	43	7	1	5	6	2
1979–80	Montreal Canadiens	NHL	60	18	27	45	68	10	4	5	9	12
1980–81	Montreal Canadiens	NHL	77	27	31	58	83	3	1	0	1	6
1981–82	Montreal Canadiens	NHL	51	11	32	43	34	5	0	4	4	6
1982–83	Montreal Canadiens	NHL	16	2	3	5	8	1	0	0	0	0
WHA totals			214	118	139	257	115	20	12	6	18	10
NHL totals			635	161	247	408	395	90	14	34	48	66

=== International ===
Year	Team	Event	GP	G	A	Pts	PIM
1974	Canada	SS	7	1	1	2	2
Senior totals			7	1	1	2	2

Preceded by Michel Plasse	NHL first overall draft pick 1969	Succeeded by Gilbert Perreault
Preceded by Michel Plasse	Montreal Canadiens first-round draft pick 1969	Succeeded by Marc Tardif
Preceded by Serge Savard	General Manager of the Montreal Canadiens; 1995–2000	Succeeded by Andre Savard
