= John Schella =

Canadian ice hockey player (1947–2018)

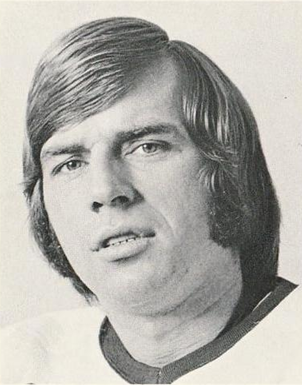
- Born: May 9, 1947 Port Arthur, Ontario, Canada
- Died: August 3, 2018 (aged 71) Westlock, Alberta, Canada
- Height: 6 ft 0 in (183 cm)
- Weight: 180 lb (82 kg; 12 st 12 lb)
- Position: Defence
- Shot: Right
- Played for: Vancouver Canucks; Houston Aeros
- Playing career: 1966–1979

John Edward Schella (May 9, 1947 – August 3, 2018) was a Canadian professional ice hockey player who played 385 games in the World Hockey Association and 115 games in the National Hockey League. After three seasons in the minor leagues, Schella made his NHL debut in 1970 with the Vancouver Canucks, spending parts of two seasons with the team before moving to the Houston Aeros of the WHA, where he spent six seasons. Schella played one final year in the minor leagues before retiring in 1979.

== Career statistics ==
=== Regular season and playoffs ===
			Regular season					Playoffs
Season	Team	League	GP	G	A	Pts	PIM	GP	G	A	Pts	PIM
1963–64	Fort William Canadiens	TBJHL	24	2	0	2	34	11	1	3	4	57
1964–65	Fort William Canadiens	TBJHL	24	6	16	22	131	—	—	—	—	—
1964–65	Fort William Beavers	TBSHL	2	0	0	0	0	—	—	—	—	—
1965–66	Fort William Canadiens	TBJHL	30	8	29	37	136	—	—	—	—	—
1966–67	Peterborough Petes	OHA	47	11	11	22	182	6	2	3	5	12
1967–68	Houston Apollos	CHL	39	5	2	7	110	—	—	—	—	—
1968–69	Denver Spurs	WHL	69	4	22	26	152	—	—	—	—	—
1969–70	Denver Spurs	WHL	67	7	30	37	198	—	—	—	—	—
1970–71	Rochester Americans	AHL	33	3	14	17	118	—	—	—	—	—
1970–71	Vancouver Canucks	NHL	38	0	5	5	58	—	—	—	—	—
1971–72	Vancouver Canucks	NHL	77	2	13	15	166	—	—	—	—	—
1972–73	Houston Aeros	WHA	77	2	24	26	239	10	0	2	2	12
1973–74	Houston Aeros	WHA	73	12	19	31	170	14	2	6	8	42
1974–75	Houston Aeros	WHA	78	10	42	52	176	13	0	8	8	12
1975–76	Houston Aeros	WHA	74	6	32	38	106	17	1	6	7	38
1976–77	Houston Aeros	WHA	20	0	6	6	28	6	1	2	3	6
1977–78	Houston Aeros	WHA	63	9	20	29	125	6	0	1	1	33
1978–79	Binghamton Dusters	AHL	2	1	1	2	0	10	0	0	0	12
1978–79	San Diego Hawks	PHL	58	6	21	27	145	—	—	—	—	—
WHA totals			385	39	143	182	844	66	4	25	29	143
NHL totals			115	2	18	20	224	—	—	—	—	—
