= Jim Shaw (ice hockey) =

Canadian ice hockey player

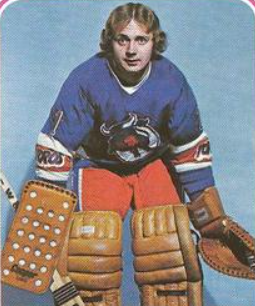
- Shaw in 1975 card
- Born: October 18, 1945 (age 80) Saskatoon, Saskatchewan, Canada
- Height: 6 ft 0 in (183 cm)
- Weight: 180 lb (82 kg; 12 st 12 lb)
- Position: Goaltender
- Caught: Left
- Played for: WHA; Toronto Toros; IHL; Fort Wayne Komets; CHL; Dallas Black Hawks; Indianapolis Checkers; WHL; Portland Buckaroos; AHL; Baltimore Clippers; Nova Scotia Voyageurs
- NHL draft: Undrafted
- Playing career: 1968–1976

James Morris Shaw (born October 18, 1945) is a Canadian former professional ice hockey goaltender. During the 1973–74 and 1974–75, Shaw played 37 games with the Toronto Toros of the World Hockey Association (WHA).

== Awards and honors ==
Award	Year	Citation
Harry "Hap" Holmes Memorial Award	1973–74	

== Career statistics ==
=== Regular season and playoffs ===
			Regular season									Playoffs
Season	Team	League	GP	W	L	T	MIN	GA	SO	GAA	SV%	GP	W	L	MIN	GA	SO	GAA	SV%
1965–66	Saskatoon Blades	SJHL
1968–69	Fort Wayne Komets	IHL	57	–	–	–	3320	168	2	3.36	–	6	–	–	–	–	–	–	–
1970–71	Dallas Black Hawks	CHL	46	–	–	–	2792	150	4	3.23	–	9	–	–	–	–	–	–	–
1971–72	Portland Buckaroos	WHL	12	1	9	0	605	50	0	4.96	.868	–	–	–	–	–	–	–	–
1971–72	Baltimore Clippers	AHL	6	–	–	–	359	22	0	3.67	–	16	–	–	–	–	–	–	–
1972–73	Baltimore Clippers	AHL	47	–	–	–	2653	161	2	3.64	–	–	–	–	–	–	–	–	–
1973–74	Nova Scotia Voyageurs	AHL	41	–	–	–	2327	104	3	2.68	–	2	–	–	–	–	–	–	–
1974–75	Toronto Toros	WHA	22	7	9	1	1055	70	0	3.91	.885	5	2	2	262	18	0	4.12
1975–76	Toronto Toros	WHA	16	4	7	1	777	63	0	4.86	.875	–	–	–	–	–	–	–	–
WHA totals			38	11	16	2	1832	133	0	4.36	.881	5	2	2	262	18	0	4.12
