= Bill Friday (ice hockey) =

Canadian ice hockey referee (1933–2024)

- Friday at the Hamilton Sports Hall of Fame with his WHA hockey sweater
- Born: January 24, 1933
- Died: May 13, 2024 (aged 91); Hamilton, Ontario, Canada
- Occupations: NHL and WHA referee

Bill Friday (January 24, 1933 – May 13, 2024) was a Canadian ice hockey referee. He refereed 1,425 major league hockey games, and is the only referee to work both the Avco Cup Finals in the World Hockey Association (WHA) and the Stanley Cup Final (doing so for six straight years from 1967 to 1972) in the National Hockey League (NHL).

== Early life ==
Prior to serving as a referee, Friday had played minor and Junior B hockey in Hamilton, Ontario, his hometown; his father was a police officer. In 2010, he was inducted into the city's Sports Hall of Fame and on April 6, 2017, the Lawfield Arena was renamed "Bill Friday Lawfield Arena" in his honor (ironically, Friday never played at the arena but his children did so).

== Referee career ==
Friday started his officiating career in the NHL as a linesman for the 1959-60 season. Likely due to his name, he and his family would constantly hear chants of "Friday is a bum, Friday is a bum". In 1969, Friday served as the first president of the NHL Officials Association. He moved to the WHA in 1972 on an initial contract of $50,000 a year for three years (the NHL had been paying him $22,000 and countered with raising it to $34,000 at the final offer) but elected to sign with the WHA due to his five children at home; he ultimately worked for the league in all seven years and never had a paycheck missed. He refereed the first ever WHA game in 1973. A noted showman who was quoted as one who "enjoyed the notoriety", he referred over the games of players ranging from Gordie Howe to Marc Tardif all the way to Wayne Gretzky. After refereeing in the Avco Cup in 1975, he had announced his retirement. In 1976 he was named the WHA's referee-in-chief and he did referee games in 1977 for the Finals. He ultimately referred the final WHA game in 1979.

== Personal life and death ==
Friday married his wife in Donna Jones in 1952. In 70 years of marriage, they had five children together.

Friday died from cancer in Hamilton, Ontario on May 13, 2024, at the age of 91.

== Legacy ==
Ron MacLean cited him as among the two most important signings (alone with Bobby Hull) in launching the World Hockey Association in terms of instant credibility among hockey fans. Ken Campbell of The Hockey News even advocated for Friday to be inducted into the Hockey Hall of Fame.

In 2010, Friday was an inaugural inductee into the Hamilton Sports Hall of Fame.

In 2012, Friday was elected to the World Hockey Association Hall of Fame.
