= 1974–75 WHA season =

Professional ice hockey league season

- League: World Hockey Association
- Sport: Ice hockey
- Duration: October 15, 1974 – May 12, 1975
- Games: 78
- Teams: 14

Draft
- Top draft pick: Pat Price
- Picked by: Vancouver Blazers

Regular season
- Season champions: Houston Aeros
- Season MVP: Bobby Hull (Winnipeg)
- Top scorer: Andre Lacroix (San Diego)

Playoffs
- Playoffs MVP: Ron Grahame (Aeros)

Avco Cup Final
- Champions: Houston Aeros
- Runners-up: Quebec Nordiques

WHA seasons
- 1973–74 1975–76

The 1974–75 WHA season was the third season of the World Hockey Association. Fourteen teams each played 78 games. The Houston Aeros won the Avco World Trophy for the second straight year in dominating fashion, losing only one time in the playoffs.

== Regular season ==
The WHA expanded by adding the Indianapolis Racers and Phoenix Roadrunners, and splitting into three divisions: Western, Eastern, and Canadian. The top two teams in each division qualified for the playoffs along with the two next best teams overall. Prior to the season, Southern California welcomed the Jersey Knights, who moved to San Diego and became the Mariners, and said goodbye to the Los Angeles Sharks, who moved to Detroit and became the Michigan Stags. Midway through the season, the Stags moved to Baltimore and became the Blades; they folded for good after the season. Chicago also folded at season's end. Also, the New England Whalers left Boston for Hartford, but played the first half of the season in Springfield, Massachusetts until construction on the Hartford Civic Center was finished.

The NHL also expanded this season, to 18 teams, making a total of 32 clubs playing major professional hockey in North America. This number has not been surpassed, though the NHL expanded to 32 teams in 2021.

=== Final standings ===
Canadian Division	GP	W	L	T	Pts	GF	GA	PIM
Quebec Nordiques	78	46	32	0	92	331	299	1132
Toronto Toros	78	43	33	2	88	349	304	883
Winnipeg Jets	78	38	35	5	81	322	293	869
Vancouver Blazers	78	37	39	2	76	256	270	1075
Edmonton Oilers	78	36	38	4	76	279	279	896

Eastern Division	GP	W	L	T	Pts	GF	GA	PIM
New England Whalers	78	43	30	5	91	274	279	867
Cleveland Crusaders	78	35	40	3	73	236	258	1273
Chicago Cougars	78	30	47	1	61	261	312	1086
Indianapolis Racers	78	18	57	3	39	216	338	970

Western Division	GP	W	L	T	Pts	GF	GA	PIM
Houston Aeros	78	53	25	0	106	369	247	1257
San Diego Mariners	78	43	31	4	90	326	268	1058
Minnesota Fighting Saints	78	42	33	3	87	308	279	1233
Phoenix Roadrunners	78	39	31	8	86	300	265	1388
Michigan Stags / Baltimore Blades	78	21	53	4	46	205	341	1104

== Player stats ==
=== Scoring leaders ===
_{Bolded numbers indicate season leaders}

GP = Games played; G = Goals; A = Assists; Pts = Points; PIM = Penalty minutes

Player	Team	GP	G	A	Pts	PIM
Andre Lacroix	San Diego Mariners	78	41	**106**	**147**	63
Bobby Hull	Winnipeg Jets	78	**77**	65	142	41
Serge Bernier	Quebec Nordiques	76	54	68	122	75
Ulf Nilsson	Winnipeg Jets	78	26	94	120	79
Larry Lund	Houston Aeros	78	33	75	108	68
Wayne Rivers	San Diego Mariners	78	54	53	107	52
Anders Hedberg	Winnipeg Jets	65	53	47	100	45
Gordie Howe	Houston Aeros	75	34	65	99	84
Wayne Dillon	Toronto Toros	77	29	66	95	22
Mike Walton	Minnesota Fighting Saints	75	48	45	93	33

=== Leading goaltenders ===
_{Bolded numbers indicate season leaders}

GP = Games played; Min = Minutes played; W = Wins; L = Losses; T = Ties, GA = Goals against; GA = Goals against; SO = Shutouts; SV% = Save percentage; GAA = Goals against average

Player	Team	GP	Min	W	L	T	GA	SO	SV%	GAA
Ron Grahame	Houston Aeros	43	2590	**33**	10	0	131	**4**	90.0	**3.03**
Bob Whidden	Cleveland Crusaders	29	1654	9	16	1	89	0	91.2	3.23
Wayne Rutledge	Houston Aeros	35	2092	20	15	0	113	2	89.2	3.24
Ernie Wakely	Winnipeg - San Diego	41	2418	23	15	2	131	3	90.0	3.25
Gerry Cheevers	Cleveland Crusaders	52	3076	26	24	2	167	**4**	**90.5**	3.26
Jack Norris	Phoenix Roadrunners	33	1962	14	15	4	107	1	89.1	3.27
John Garrett	Minnesota Fighting Saints	58	3294	30	23	2	180	2	90.5	3.28
Gary Kurt	Phoenix Roadrunners	47	2841	25	16	4	156	2	88.5	3.27
Jacques Plante	Edmonton Oilers	40	1592	15	14	1	88	1	89.0	3.32
Don McLeod	Vancouver Blazers	**71**	**4124**	32	**35**	2	230	1	89.1	3.35

== All-Star game ==
At Northlands Coliseum in Edmonton, the West defeated the East 6–4 in the 1975 WHA All-Star Game.

== Avco World Trophy playoffs ==
Eight teams qualified for the playoffs; the top two teams in each division and the next two teams with the highest point totals. The teams were then pooled together, according to point totals, to determine quarter-final match-ups. The three division winners were guaranteed the top three seeds, according to their point totals. Teams were not "reseeded" after the quarter-final round.

Quarterfinals
W1	Houston Aeros	4
E2	Cleveland Crusaders	1
W2	San Diego Mariners	4
C2	Toronto Toros	2
E1	New England Whalers	2
W3	Minnesota Fighting Saints	4
C1	Quebec Nordiques	4
W4	Phoenix Roadrunners	1

Semifinals
W1	Houston Aeros	4
W2	San Diego Mariners	0
W3	Minnesota Fighting Saints	2
C1	Quebec Nordiques	4

Finals
W1	Houston Aeros	4
C1	Quebec Nordiques	0

== WHA awards ==
=== Trophies ===
Avco World Trophy:	Houston Aeros
Gary L. Davidson Award:	Bobby Hull, Winnipeg Jets
Bill Hunter Trophy:	Andre Lacroix, San Diego Mariners
Lou Kaplan Trophy:	Anders Hedberg, Winnipeg Jets
Ben Hatskin Trophy:	Ron Grahame, Houston Aeros
Dennis A. Murphy Trophy:	J. C. Tremblay, Quebec Nordiques
Paul Deneau Trophy:	Mike Rogers, Edmonton Oilers
Howard Baldwin Trophy:	Sandy Hucul, Phoenix Roadrunners
WHA Playoff MVP:	Ron Grahame, Houston Aeros

=== All-Star Team ===
Position	First Team	Second Team
Centre	Andre Lacroix, San Diego	Serge Bernier, Quebec
Right Wing	Gordie Howe, Houston	Anders Hedberg, Winnipeg
Left Wing	Bobby Hull, Winnipeg	Marc Tardif, Quebec
Defence	J. C. Tremblay, Quebec	Poul Popiel, Houston
Defence	Kevin Morrison, San Diego	Barry Long, Edmonton
Goaltender	Ron Grahame, Houston	Gerry Cheevers, Cleveland

== 77 goals in 78 games ==
In the 1974–75 WHA season, Bobby Hull set a professional hockey record for goals in a season, doing so with 77 goals in 78 games that eclipsed Phil Esposito's 76 in the 1970–71 NHL season. He set the WHA record on March 12 against Quebec with a two-goal night that gave him 62 goals. On April 6, 1975, in his 78th and last game played that season, Hull scored against Russ Gillow of the San Diego Mariners to get to 77 goals.

Recorded a hat trick
Recorded zero goals

Game #	Goal #	Date	Venue	Team	Goaltender	Time	Period	Ref.
1	None	October 15, 1974	Pacific Coliseum	Vancouver Blazers	Don McLeod	–	–	
2	None	October 18, 1974	Winnipeg Arena	Edmonton Oilers	Ken Brown	–	–	
3	1	October 25, 1974	Maple Leaf Gardens	Toronto Toros	Jim Shaw	4:09	1st	
4	2	October 27, 1974	Winnipeg Arena	Michigan Stags	Gerry Desjardins	8:55	3rd	
5	3	October 30, 1974	Winnipeg Arena	Phoenix Roadrunners	Gary Kurt	7:40	1st	
5	4	October 30, 1974	Winnipeg Arena	Phoenix Roadrunners	Gary Kurt	6:49	2nd	
5	5	October 30, 1974	Winnipeg Arena	Phoenix Roadrunners	Gary Kurt	9:19	OT	
6	6	November 1, 1974	Winnipeg Arena	Toronto Toros	Gilles Gratton	7:20	1st	
6	7	November 1, 1974	Winnipeg Arena	Toronto Toros	Gilles Gratton	6:43	2nd	
6	8	November 1, 1974	Winnipeg Arena	Toronto Toros	Gilles Gratton	11:37	3rd	
7	9	November 3, 1974	Winnipeg Arena	Michigan Stags	Jim McLeod	8:05	1st	
7	10	November 3, 1974	Winnipeg Arena	Michigan Stags	Jim McLeod	18:24	2nd	
8	11	November 5, 1974	Winnipeg Arena	Minnesota Fighting Saints	Mike Curran	9:34	3rd	
9	12	November 9, 1974	Pacific Coliseum	Vancouver Blazers	Don McLeod	13:54	2nd	
10	13	November 13, 1974	Edmonton Coliseum	Edmonton Oilers	Jacques Plante	6:18	2nd	
11	None	November 15, 1974	Winnipeg Arena	Indianapolis Racers	Ed Dyck	–	–	
12	None	November 17, 1974	Winnipeg Arena	Toronto Toros	Jim Shaw	–	–	
13	14	November 18, 1974	Edmonton Coliseum	Edmonton Oilers	Jacques Plante	19:07	1st	
13	15	November 18, 1974	Edmonton Coliseum	Edmonton Oilers	Jacques Plante	5:39	2nd	
14	16	November 20, 1974	Winnipeg Arena	Minnesota Fighting Saints	Mike Curran	18:53	1st	
14	17	November 20, 1974	Winnipeg Arena	Minnesota Fighting Saints	Mike Curran	12:59	3rd	
15	None	November 24, 1974	Winnipeg Arena	Phoenix Roadrunners	Jack Norris	–	–	
16	18	November 26, 1974	Market Square Arena	Indianapolis Racers	Andy Brown	5:56	1st	
17	19	November 27, 1974	Richfield Coliseum	Cleveland Crusaders	Gerry Cheevers	15:55	1st	
18	20	November 29, 1974	Winnipeg Arena	Michigan Stags	Gerry Desjardins	4:13	1st	
18	21	November 29, 1974	Winnipeg Arena	Michigan Stags	Gerry Desjardins	14:40	2nd	
18	22	November 29, 1974	Winnipeg Arena	Michigan Stags	Gerry Desjardins	18:58	2nd	
18	23	November 29, 1974	Winnipeg Arena	Michigan Stags	Gerry Desjardins	5:50	3rd	
19	None	December 1, 1974	Winnipeg Arena	Quebec Nordiques	Richard Brodeur	–	–	
20	None	December 4, 1974	Winnipeg Arena	Houston Aeros	Ron Grahame	–	–	
21	None	December 6, 1974	Saint Paul Civic Center	Minnesota Fighting Saints	Mike Curran	–	–	
22	None	December 8, 1974	Winnipeg Arena	Chicago Cougars	Cam Newton	–	–	
23	24	December 10, 1974	Market Square Arena	Indianapolis Racers	Andy Brown	18:47	1st	
24	25	December 12, 1974	Cobo Hall	Michigan Stags	Gerry Desjardins	8:46	3rd	
25	26	December 14, 1974	Sam Houston Coliseum	Houston Aeros	Ron Grahame	7:58	1st	
26	27	December 15, 1974	Winnipeg Arena	New England Whalers	Al Smith	8:24	1st	
27	28	December 17, 1974	Maple Leaf Gardens	Toronto Toros	Gilles Gratton	9:00	1st	
27	29	December 17, 1974	Maple Leaf Gardens	Toronto Toros	Gilles Gratton	16:16	1st	
28	None	December 18, 1974	Le Colisee	Quebec Nordiques	Richard Brodeur	–	–	
29	30	December 22, 1974	Winnipeg Arena	Phoenix Roadrunners	Gary Kurt	2:14	2nd	
30	None	December 26, 1974	Arizona Veterans Memorial Coliseum	Phoenix Roadrunners	Jack Norris	–	–	
31	31	December 28, 1974	San Diego Sports Arena	San Diego Mariners	Joe Junkin	1:02	1st	
31	32	December 28, 1974	San Diego Sports Arena	San Diego Mariners	Russ Gillow	5:05	2nd	
32	33	December 29, 1974	Sam Houston Coliseum	Houston Aeros	Wayne Rutledge	6:21	1st	
32	34	December 29, 1974	Sam Houston Coliseum	Houston Aeros	Wayne Rutledge	6:01	2nd	
33	35	January 7, 1975	Richfield Coliseum	Cleveland Crusaders	Gerry Cheevers	16:29	1st	
34	36	January 9, 1975	Cobo Hall	Michigan Stags	Paul Hoganson	4:59	1st	
35	None	January 10, 1975	Winnipeg Arena	Quebec Nordiques	Richard Brodeur	–	–	
36	None	January 15, 1975	Winnipeg Arena	Vancouver Blazers	Don McLeod	–	–	
37	37	January 19, 1975	Winnipeg Arena	Cleveland Crusaders	Gerry Cheevers	8:30	1st	
37	38	January 19, 1975	Winnipeg Arena	Cleveland Crusaders	Gerry Cheevers	5:54	3rd	
38	39	January 22, 1975	Winnipeg Arena	Indianapolis Racers	Andy Brown	15:25	1st	
39	40	January 23, 1975	Edmonton Coliseum	Edmonton Oilers	Jacques Plante	2:46	2nd	
39	41	January 23, 1975	Edmonton Coliseum	Edmonton Oilers	Jacques Plante	17:43	3rd	
40	None	January 24, 1975	Pacific Coliseum	Vancouver Blazers	Don McLeod	–	–	
41	None	January 26, 1975	Winnipeg Arena	Houston Aeros	Ron Grahame	–	–	
42	42	January 28, 1975	San Diego Sports Arena	San Diego Mariners	Ernie Wakely	19:41	1st	
42	43	January 28, 1975	San Diego Sports Arena	San Diego Mariners	Ernie Wakely	3:24	3rd	
43	44	January 30, 1975	Arizona Veterans Memorial Coliseum	Phoenix Roadrunners	empty net	19:15	3rd	
44	45	February 2, 1975	Saint Paul Civic Center	Minnesota Fighting Saints	John Garrett	17:13	1st	
45	None	February 5, 1975	Richfield Coliseum	Cleveland Crusaders	Gerry Cheevers	–	–	
46	46	February 7, 1975	Winnipeg Arena	New England Whalers	Al Smith	0:32	2nd	
47	47	February 8, 1975	International Amphitheater	Chicago Cougars	Dave Dryden	6:21	1st	
48	None	February 9, 1975	Winnipeg Arena	Chicago Cougars	Dave Dryden	–	–	
49	None	February 12, 1975	Winnipeg Arena	Toronto Toros	Gilles Gratton	–	–	
50	48	February 14, 1975	Winnipeg Arena	Houston Aeros	Ron Grahame	1:42	1st	
50	49	February 14, 1975	Winnipeg Arena	Houston Aeros	Ron Grahame	16:47	2nd	
50	50	February 14, 1975	Winnipeg Arena	Houston Aeros	Ron Grahame	18:27	3rd	
51	None	February 15, 1975	Winnipeg Arena	Cleveland Crusaders	Bob Whidden	–	–	
52	None	February 16, 1975	International Amphitheater	Chicago Cougars	Cam Newton	–	–	
53	51	February 18, 1975	Baltimore Civic Center	Baltimore Blades	Paul Hoganson	1:46	2nd	
53	52	February 18, 1975	Baltimore Civic Center	Baltimore Blades	Paul Hoganson	6:29	2nd	
54	None	February 19, 1975	Winnipeg Arena	Edmonton Oilers	Chris Worthy	–	–	
55	None	February 23, 1975	Winnipeg Arena	New England Whalers	Al Smith	–	–	
56	53	February 25, 1975	Winnipeg Arena	Minnesota Fighting Saints	Mike Curran	6:25	3rd	
57	54	February 28, 1975	Winnipeg Arena	San Diego Mariners	Ernie Wakely	13:37	1st	
57	55	February 28, 1975	Winnipeg Arena	San Diego Mariners	Ernie Wakely	17:17	3rd	
58	56	March 2, 1975	Winnipeg Arena	San Diego Mariners	Ernie Wakely	8:13	2nd	
59	57	March 5, 1975	Winnipeg Arena	Cleveland Crusaders	Gerry Cheevers	19:30	3rd	
60	58	March 7, 1975	Arizona Veterans Memorial Coliseum	Phoenix Roadrunners	Gary Kurt	2:15	1st	
60	59	March 7, 1975	Arizona Veterans Memorial Coliseum	Phoenix Roadrunners	Gary Kurt	12:27	1st	
61	None	March 8, 1975	San Diego Sports Arena	San Diego Mariners	Ernie Wakely	–	–	
62	60	March 9, 1975	Saint Paul Civic Center	Minnesota Fighting Saints	Mike Curran	18:07	2nd	
63	None	March 11, 1975	Hartford Civic Center	New England Whalers	Al Smith	–	–	
64	61	March 12, 1975	Le Colisee	Quebec Nordiques	Serge Aubry	15:55	1st	
64	62	March 12, 1975	Le Colisee	Quebec Nordiques	Serge Aubry	1:56	2nd	
65	63	March 14, 1975	Winnipeg Arena	Quebec Nordiques	Richard Brodeur	11:36	3rd	
66	64	March 16, 1975	Winnipeg Arena	Edmonton Oilers	Ken Brown	6:04	2nd	
66	65	March 16, 1975	Winnipeg Arena	Edmonton Oilers	Chris Worthy	2:42	3rd	
66	66	March 16, 1975	Winnipeg Arena	Edmonton Oilers	Chris Worthy	18:48	3rd	
67	67	March 19, 1975	Winnipeg Arena	Vancouver Blazers	Don McLeod	11:12	3rd	
67	68	March 19, 1975	Winnipeg Arena	Vancouver Blazers	Don McLeod	15:54	3rd	
68	69	March 21, 1975	Hartford Civic Center	New England Whalers	Al Smith	11:30	3rd	
69	70	March 22, 1975	International Amphitheater	Chicago Cougars	Dave Dryden	10:37	2nd	
70	None	March 23, 1975	Winnipeg Arena	Chicago Cougars	Dave Dryden	–	–	
71	71	March 25, 1975	Market Square Arena	Indianapolis Racers	Andy Brown	6:00	1st	
71	72	March 25, 1975	Market Square Arena	Indianapolis Racers	Andy Brown	13:16	1st	
72	None	March 27, 1975	Sam Houston Coliseum	Houston Aeros	Ron Grahame	–	–	
73	73	March 29, 1975	Hartford Civic Center	New England Whalers	Al Smith	10:38	2nd	
73	74	March 29, 1975	Hartford Civic Center	New England Whalers	Al Smith	19:55	2nd	
73	75	March 29, 1975	Hartford Civic Center	New England Whalers	Al Smith	12:30	3rd	
74	None	March 31, 1975	Winnipeg Arena	Indianapolis Racers	Andy Brown; Ed Dyck	–	–	
75	None	April 2, 1975	Winnipeg Arena	Vancouver Blazers	Don McLeod	–	–	
76	None	April 4, 1975	Maple Leaf Gardens	Toronto Toros	Jim Shaw	–	–	
77	76	April 5, 1975	Le Colisee	Quebec Nordiques	Richard Brodeur	19:40	3rd	
78	77	April 6, 1975	Winnipeg Arena	San Diego Mariners	Russ Gillow	19:26	2nd	

== See also ==
- 1974 Summit Series
- 1974 WHA Amateur Draft
- 1974 in sports
- 1975 in sports
