= 1973 WHA playoffs =

WHA postseason tournament

Tournament details
- Dates: April 4 – May 6, 1973
- Teams: 8
- Defending champions: None

Final positions
- Champions: New England Whalers
- Runners-up: Winnipeg Jets

Tournament statistics
- Scoring leader(s): Norm Beaudin (Jets) (28 points)

The 1973 WHA playoffs was the postseason tournament of the World Hockey Association's 1972–73 season. The tournament concluded with the Eastern Division champion New England Whalers defeating the Western Division champion Winnipeg Jets in five games for the first Avco Cup championship. They lost just three playoff games total in their Avco Cup run, which included a perfect 9–0 record at home. The peak attendance for a playoff game that year was Game 4 of the Avco Cup Final when 13,697 people attended at Boston Garden. Norm Beaudin of the Winnipeg Jets led all teams in goals (13) and points scored (28).

== Playoff seeds ==
The top four teams in each division made the playoffs. Ottawa narrowly made the playoffs by three points over Quebec while Minnesota got in by virtue of a play-in game versus Alberta.

=== Eastern Division ===
1. New England Whalers, Eastern Division champions – 94 points
2. Cleveland Crusaders – 89 points
3. Philadelphia Blazers – 76 points
4. Ontario Nationals – 74 points

=== Western Division ===
1. Winnipeg Jets, Western Division champions – 90 points
2. Houston Aeros – 82 points
3. Los Angeles Sharks – 80 points
4. Minnesota Fighting Saints – 79 points

== Bracket ==
Quarterfinals
E1	New England Whalers	4
E4	Ontario Nationals	1
Eastern Division
E2	Cleveland Crusaders	4
E3	Philadelphia Blazers	0
W1	Winnipeg Jets	4
W4	Minnesota Fighting Saints	1
Western Division
W2	Houston Aeros	4
W3	Los Angeles Sharks	2

Semifinals
E1	New England Whalers	4
E2	Cleveland Crusaders	1
W1	Winnipeg Jets	4
W2	Houston Aeros	0

Finals
E1	New England Whalers	4
W1	Winnipeg Jets	1

== Fourth Place Tiebreaker Game ==
At the end of the season, the WHA had a problem involving the fourth and final team to make the postseason in the Western Division. The Alberta Oilers and Minnesota Fighting Saints finished the season with the same record of 38–37–3 after Alberta beat Minnesota on March 30 by a score of 5–3 for their fourth victory in eight contests. The league had done a directive on March 21 that would do away with having a playoff game to settle ties, instead favoring tiebreakers for those with more wins over the other team while also stating that in the event of each team being even, the next tiebreaker would be victories within the Western Division, which favored the Oilers (21 wins) over Minnesota (17 wins). However, Minnesota challenged the rule and got the backing of the WHA owners on their side to instead go with a one-game playoff to settle ties here, with Alberta owner Bill Hunter calling the Saints organization "the No. 1 award for bushers." The league Board of Governors, meeting quickly to decide, elected to move on a one-game playoff while allowing the Oilers to have a choice of site, and due to prior booking in Edmonton, the team elected to pick Calgary to host the one-game playoff. Mel Pearson scored the first goal seventeen minutes into the game for the Fighting Saints.

April 4	Minnesota Fighting Saints	4–2 (1–0, 1–0, 2–2)	Alberta Oilers	Calgary Corral; Attendance: 6,302

Box score
Mike Curran (22 saves / 25 shots)	Goalies	Jack Norris (20 saves / 24 shots)
17:15 (1st) – Mel Pearson; 11:07 (2nd) – Wayne Connelly (Terry Ball, John Arbour); 3:14 (3rd) – Mike Antonovich (Bill Young, John Arbour); 3:34 (3rd) – Bill Young (Mike McMahon, Wayne Connelly) / Goals / 6:37 (3rd) – Ron Walters (Jim Harrison, Dennis Kassian); 8:25 (3rd) – Ken Baird (Bob Wall, Rusty Patenaude)
24	Shots	25

Game summary
Shots by Minnesota: 24 (5–11–8); Shots by Alberta: 25 (11–8–6)

== Division Semifinals ==
=== Eastern Division Semifinals ===
==== (E1) New England Whalers vs. (E4) Ontario Nationals ====
New England had gone 5–3 against the Nationals in the regular season.

Owing to a dispute with the city of Ottawa, the Nationals elected to play their playoff games at Maple Leaf Gardens rather than their regular season home of the Ottawa Civic Centre. The equipment for the team was placed in Maple Leaf Gardens on the eve of Game 1. The team called themselves the "Ontario Nationals" for the playoffs and never played in Ottawa again, as they were sold to interests that had them play in Toronto as the Toronto Toros. Brit Selby and Mike Byers each scored game-winning goals in overtime to win games for the Whalers, with the latter being the first to end a postseason series with an overtime goal that saw the Whalers send the Nationals home.

April 7	Ottawa Nationals	3–6 (0–1, 1–2, 2–3)	New England Whalers	Boston Garden; Attendance: 9,359

Box score
Les Binkley	Goalies	Al Smith
4:30 (2nd) – Bob Charlebois (G. Trottier, K. Stephanson); 1:29 (3rd) – Jack Gibson; 15:14 (3rd) – Rick Cunningham (G. Trottier, B. Leduc) / Goals / 15:07 (1st) – Larry Pleau (T. Webster, B. Selwood); 11:48 (2nd) – Kevin Ahearn (J. Dorey, M. Byers); 18:32 (2nd) – Tommy Williams (M. Byers, J. Dorey); 3:37 (3rd) – Mike Byers (J. Dorey, K. Ahearn); 16:51 (3rd) – Brit Selby (J. Dorey, T. Webster); 19:41 (3rd) – Terry Caffery (B. Selby, T. Webster)
28 (7–5–16)	Shots	58 (19–19–20)

April 8	Ottawa Nationals	3–4 (OT) (2–0, 0–2, 1–1, 0–1)	New England Whalers	Boston Garden; Attendance: 6,156

Box score
Gilles Gratton	Goalies	Al Smith
5:37 (1st) – Brian Conacher; 15:59 (1st) – Gavin Kirk; 19:06 (3rd) – Ron Climie / Goals / 5:41 (2nd) – Tom Webster; 18:49 (2nd) – Tom Webster; 13:47 (3rd) – Brad Selwood; 3:37 (OT) – Brit Selby
29 (15–6–6–2)	Shots	57 (16–22–15–4)

April 10	New England Whalers	2–4 (0–2, 1–1, 1–1)	Ottawa Nationals	Maple Leaf Gardens; Attendance: 4,879

Box score
Al Smith	Goalies	Les Binkley
7:53 (2nd) – Tom Webster; 15:23 (3rd) – Tom Webster / Goals / 4:43 (1st) – Rick Sentes; 15:11 (1st) – Ken Stephanson; 18:10 (2nd) – Guy Trottier; 12:23 (3rd) – Rick Sentes
30 (11–10–9)	Shots	25 (6–8–11)

April 12	New England Whalers	7–3 (3–0, 3–2, 1–1)	Ottawa Nationals	Maple Leaf Gardens; Attendance: 3,941

Box score
Al Smith	Goalies	Les Binkley
3:14 (1st) – Larry Pleau; 3:40 (1st) – Tommy Williams; 15:24 (1st) – Terry Caffery; 6:47 (2nd) – Tommy Williams; 13:43 (2nd) – Terry Caffery; 17:54 (2nd) – Tommy Williams; 16:14 (3rd) – Mike Byers / Goals / 7:07 (2nd) – Wayne Carleton; 14:34 (2nd)- Wayne Carleton; 13:01 (3rd) – Wayne Carleton
35 (11–13–11)	Shots	18 (5–8–5)

April 14	Ottawa Nationals	4–5 (OT) (1–2, 1–2, 2–0, 0–1)	New England Whalers	Boston Garden; Attendance: 12,033

Box score
Gilles Gratton; Les Binkley	Goalies	Al Smith
10:56 (1st) – Gavin Kirk; 19:45 (2nd) – Tom Simpson; 6:12 (3rd) – Rick Sentes; 13:40 (3rd) – Brian Gibbons / Goals / 8:48 (1st) – Tom Webster; 13:21 (1st) – Tom Webster; 3:00 (2nd) – Larry Pleau; 12:52 (2nd) – Tom Webster; 3:47 (OT) – Mike Byers
30 (7–10–13–0)	Shots	39 (14–10–9–6)

==== (E2) Cleveland Crusaders vs. (E3) Philadelphia Blazers ====
The Crusaders finished as the second-best team in the East with a 43–32–3 record and led the league in goals allowed with just 239 to go with a 4th best offense with 287 goals. The Philadelphia Blazers squeaked into the postseason as the 3rd team with a record of 38–40–0 to go with the third best offense with 288 goals scored and a 10th ranked defense with 305 allowed. Cleveland had gone 6–4 against Philadelphia in the regular season. In the first game, Ron Buchanan became the first WHA player to score a playoff overtime goal that gave Cleveland a 3–2 victory. It wound up also being the last WHA game played by Bernie Parent, who elected to leave the team in a contract dispute where the team had apparently dipped into the escrow account meant to play Parent's salary that essentially saw his contract voided. In Game 2, Cleveland held Philadelphia scoreless for the first 56 minutes in a 7–1 win while Gary Jarrett became the first WHA player to accomplish a playoff hat-trick (six further players joined him in the postseason).

27 total penalties were called in Game 3 (twenty combined in the first two periods), but Philadelphia went missed out of all of their ten power-play chances while Cleveland scored the first goal of the game on a shot that was rebounded off the foot of Don Burgess on the very first shot Cleveland did with 13 minutes remaining in the first period and did not trail from there for a 3–1 win. A four-goal second period in Game 4 helped the Crusaders to a 6–2 victory to finish the sweep. The Blazers moved to Vancouver in the offseason.

April 4	Philadelphia Blazers	2–3 (OT) (0–0, 0–2, 2–0, 0–1)	Cleveland Crusaders	Cleveland Arena; Attendance: 3,624

Box score
Bernie Parent	Goalies	Gerry Cheevers
7:31 (3rd) – John McKenzie; 16:50 (3rd) – John McKenzie / Goals / 0:52 (2nd) – Paul Shmyr; 17:43 (2nd) – Ray Clearwater; 9:44 (OT) – Ron Buchanan
39 (14–10–8–7)	Shots	45 (7–18–16–4)

April 7	Philadelphia Blazers	1–7 (0–2, 0–4, 1–1)	Cleveland Crusaders	Cleveland Arena; Attendance: 8,262

Box score
Marcel Paille; Yves Archambault	Goalies	Gerry Cheevers
16:04 (3rd) – Rychard Campeau / Goals / 11:51 (1st) – Gary Jarrett; 16:40 (1st) – Jim Wiste; 5:15 (2nd) – Jim Wiste; 5:51 (2nd) – Gerry Pinder; 6:10 (2nd) – Gary Jarrett; 11:20 (2nd) – Grant Erickson; 4:19 (3rd) – Gary Jarrett
30 (4–15–11)	Shots	38 (13–16–9)

April 8	Cleveland Crusaders	1–3 (1–0, 1–1, 1–0)	Philadelphia Blazers	Philadelphia Civic Center; Attendance: 4,023

Box score
Gerry Cheevers	Goalies	Yves Archambault
7:03 (1st) – Paul Andrea; 2:15 (2nd) – Grant Erickson; 13:07 (3rd) – Gary Jarrett / Goals / 8:01 (2nd) – Don Burgess
21 (9–5–7)	Shots	24 (10–8–6)

April 11	Cleveland Crusaders	6–2 (1–1, 4–1, 1–0)	Philadelphia Blazers	Philadelphia Civic Center; Attendance: 3,211

Box score
Gerry Cheevers	Goalies	Yves Archambault
10:34 (1st) – Gerry Pinder; 2:06 (2nd) – Paul Andrea; 4:16 (2nd) – Skip Krake; 5:05 (2nd) – Jim Wiste; 17:49 (2nd) – Bob Dillabough; 4:13 (3rd) – Rich Pumple / Goals / 12:36 (1st) – Don Herriman; 18:55 (2nd) – John McKenzie
32 (10–12–10)	Shots	34 (10–11–13)

=== Western Division Semifinals ===
==== (W1) Winnipeg Jets vs. (W4) Minnesota Fighting Saints ====
The Winnipeg Jets marched in as the best team in the Western Division with a 43–31–4 record that excelled at defense, holding teams to 249 goals allowed (2nd of 12 teams) with a passable 5th-ranked offense. The Minnesota Fighting Saints, having survived the tiebreaker and marching in with a 38–37–3 record that had a weak offense (250 goals, 11th of 12 teams) and a middling defense (6th). Winnipeg had gone 4–3–1 against Minnesota in the regular season. In Game 1, player-coach Bobby Hull scored two goals after scoring just one goal in five contests against Minnesota in the regular season to give Winnipeg a 3–1 victory. In Game 2, the teams were tied midway into the second period before a power play opportunity was completed by Wally Boyer to give the Jets a 3–2 lead they would never let go of, as they added two further goals to go up 2–0 in the series. Now back in Minnesota for Game 3, the Fighting Saints struck back with a four-goal first period on their way to a 6–4 victory.

In Game 4, a tight affair saw Bill Sutherland send the game into overtime with 45 seconds remaining in regulation for Winnipeg. In overtime, a Norm Beaudin shot resulted in a save by Mike Curran and a faceoff. On the faceoff, when trying to switch sides of the net to defend in the net, Curran had the butt end of his stick get stuck in the netting to where Beaudin had a perfect net to shoot in the game-winning goal for Winnipeg. A five-goal second period in Game 5 bolstered the Jets to an 8–5 victory in Game 5.

April 6	Minnesota Fighting Saints	1–3 (0–1, 0–0, 1–2)	Winnipeg Jets	Winnipeg Arena; Attendance: 7,354

Box score
Jack McCartan	Goalies	Ernie Wakely
7:09 (3rd) – Mike Antonovich / Goals / 6:37 (1st) – Bobby Hull; 10:03 (3rd) – Bobby Hull; 15:04 (3rd) – Christian Bordeleau
29 (9–11–9)	Shots	29 (8–12–9)

April 8	Minnesota Fighting Saints	2–5 (1–1, 1–2, 0–2)	Winnipeg Jets	Winnipeg Arena; Attendance: 8,425

Box score
Jack McCartan	Goalies	Joe Daley
6:16 (1st) – George Morrison; 12:45 (2nd) – Ted Hampson / Goals / 5:25 (1st) – Christian Bordeleau; 3:28 (2nd) – Danny Johnson; 18:04 (2nd) – Wally Boyer; 0:57 (3rd) – Norm Beaudin; 19:15 (3rd) – Bobby Hull
27 (7–11–9)	Shots	47 (17–7–13)

April 10	Winnipeg Jets	4–6 (2–4, 1–0, 1–2)	Minnesota Fighting Saints	St. Paul Civic Center; Attendance: 5,151

Box score
Ernie Wakely	Goalies	Jack McCartan
9:40 (1st) – Bill Sutherland; 15:33 (1st) – Dunc Rousseau; 8:56 (2nd) – Cal Swenson; 4:03 (3rd) – Jean-Guy Gratton / Goals / 2:26 (1st) – Bill Klatt; 12:43 (1st) – Bill Young; 13:24 (1st) – Jim Johnson; 17:03 (1st) – Wayne Connelly; 6:10 (3rd) – Jim Johnson; 9:20 (3rd) – Leonard Lilyholm
40 (16–14–10)	Shots	30 (13–9–8)

April 11	Winnipeg Jets	3–2 (OT) (1–1, 0–1, 1–0, 1–0)	Minnesota Fighting Saints	St. Paul Civic Center; Attendance: 6,982

Box score
Joe Daley	Goalies	Mike Curran
6:35 (1st) – Larry Hornung; 19:15 (3rd) – Bill Sutherland; 3:12 (OT) – Norm Beaudin / Goals / 5:17 (1st) – Ted Hampson; 18:14 (2nd) – Terry Ball
41 (12–9–16–4)	Shots	34 (13–13–7–1)

April 15	Minnesota Fighting Saints	5–8 (2–2, 2–5, 1–1)	Winnipeg Jets	Winnipeg Arena; Attendance: 8,852

Box score
Mike Curran; Jack McCartan	Goalies	Ernie Wakely
4:53 (1st) – Mel Pearson; 11:47 (1st) – Keith Christiansen; 0:07 (2nd) – Mike Antonovich; 12:06 (2nd) – Mel Pearson; 14:43 (3rd) – Ted Hampson / Goals / 2:31 (1st) – Norm Beaudin; 14:22 (1st) – Bob Ash; 3:15 (2nd) – Bill Sutherland; 4:15 (2nd) – Norm Beaudin; 5:29 (2nd) – Ab McDonald; 7:08 (2nd) – Joe Zanussi; 17:06 (2nd) – Norm Beaudin; 7:13 (3rd) – Bill Sutherland
42 (8–14–20)	Shots	34 (13–12–9)

==== (W2) Houston Aeros vs. (W3) Los Angeles Sharks ====
Los Angeles had gone 6–3–1 against Houston in the regular season. A barrage of goals in the span of three minutes in Game 1 from the Aeros made the Sharks change goalies from George Gardner to Russ Gillow, but the Aeros dominated regardless, with six different players each recording a goal. The two teams traded victories before Murray Hall tied the series on an unassisted goal three minutes into sudden-death overtime. Back in Houston, the Aeros scored twice in the first nine minutes and never trailed from there to a 6–3 victory. In Game 6 in Los Angeles, the Aeros led in the first minute of play on a goal by Frank Hughes, and he scored again midway through the period to give them a 2–0 lead. Los Angeles narrowed it to 2–1 on a goal by Ralph MacSweyn but Murray Hall made it a two-goal lead late in the second period. Fred Speck narrowed it for Los Angeles to one goal with 15:01 to play but the Aeros held firm from there to win the game and the series.

April 5	Los Angeles Sharks	2–7 (0–3, 1–1, 1–3)	Houston Aeros	Sam Houston Coliseum; Attendance: 6,181

Box score
George Gardner; Russ Gillow	Goalies	Wayne Rutledge
13:21 (2nd) – Jim Niekamp; 10:40 (3rd) – Jim Niekamp / Goals / 8:03 (1st) – Larry Hale; 10:02 (1st) – Brian McDonald; 10:46 (1st) – Ted Taylor; 1:57 (2nd) – Ed Hoekstra; 2:47 (3rd) – Larry Lund; 5:05 - Dunc McCallum; 17:30 (3rd) – Ted Taylor
30 (12–8–10)	Shots	31 (8–12–11)

April 7	Los Angeles Sharks	4–2 (1–1, 0–1, 3–0)	Houston Aeros	Sam Houston Coliseum; Attendance: 7,773

Box score
George Gardner	Goalies	Wayne Rutledge
3:14 (1st) – Gary Veneruzzo; 1:26 (3rd) – Ted McCaskill; 18:22 (3rd) – Gary Veneruzzo; 19:02 (3rd) – Tom Gilmore / Goals / 14:19 (1st) – Murray Hall; 14:19 (2nd) – Brian McDonald
28 (8–10–10)	Shots	29 (13–10–6)

April 11	Houston Aeros	2–3 (2–3, 0–0, 0–0)	Los Angeles Sharks	Los Angeles Memorial Sports Arena; Attendance: 4,788

Box score
Don McLeod	Goalies	Russ Gillow
7:59 (1st) – Dunc McCallum; 12:31 (1st) – Brian McDonald / Goals / 4:33 (1st) – Alton White; 5:39 (1st) – Fred Speck; 7:14 (1st) – Gerry Odrowski
31 (7–12–12)	Shots	28 (10–13–5)

April 13	Houston Aeros	3–2 (OT) (0–0, 1–1, 1–1, 1–0)	Los Angeles Sharks	Los Angeles Memorial Sports Arena; Attendance: 6,849

Box score
Wayne Rutledge	Goalies	Russ Gillow
6:49 (2nd) – Larry Lund; 6:33 (3rd) – Poul Popiel; 3:38 (OT) – Murray Hall / Goals / 14:45 (2nd) – Ted McCaskill; 5:18 (3rd) – Fred Speck
24 (6–10–5–3)	Shots	37 (14–12–10–1)

April 15	Los Angeles Sharks	3–6 (2–3, 0–2, 1–1)	Houston Aeros	Sam Houston Coliseum; Attendance: 6,060

Box score
George Gardner; Russ Gillow	Goalies	Wayne Rutledge
10:02 (1st) – Earl Heiskala; 16:27 (1st) – Gary Veneruzzo; 9:08 (3rd) – Jerry Zrymiak / Goals / 4:48 (1st) – Frank Hughes; 9:18 (1st) – Poul Popiel; 12:06 (1st) – Frank Hughes; 2:13 (2nd) – Larry Lund; 19:16 (2nd) – Gord Labossiere; 5:33 (3rd) – Murray Hall
41 (16–11–14)	Shots	27 (11–9–7)

April 17	Houston Aeros	3–2 (2–0, 1–1, 0–1)	Los Angeles Sharks	Los Angeles Memorial Sports Arena; Attendance: 6,118

Box score
Wayne Rutledge	Goalies	Russ Gillow
0:42 (1st) – Frank Hughes; 12:40 (1st) – Frank Hughes; 17:15 (2nd) – Murray Hall / Goals / 2:24 (2nd) – Ralph MacSweyn; 4:59 (3rd) – Fred Speck
30 (9–11–10)	Shots	32 (11–11–10)

== Division Finals ==
=== Eastern Division Final ===
==== (E1) New England Whalers vs. (E2) Cleveland Crusaders ====
New England went 5–3 in the regular season against Cleveland. Amidst sweltering heat that reportedly was at 85 degrees in the Boston Garden in front of 6,101 fans, the Whalers took Game 1 with a goal by Tim Sheehy in the last 25 seconds. New England beat Cleveland in five games.

April 18	Cleveland Crusaders	2–3 (0–1, 0–0, 2–2)	New England Whalers	Boston Garden; Attendance: 6,101

Box score
Gerry Cheevers	Goalies	Al Smith
2:48 (3rd) – Ron Buchanan; 12:29 (3rd) – Rich Pumple / Goals / 4:56 (1st) – Tim Sheehy; 15:40 (3rd) – Larry Pleau; 19:35 (3rd) – Tim Sheehy
26 (10–11–5)	Shots	32 (5–8–19)

April 19	Cleveland Crusaders	2–3 (2–1, 0–2, 0–0)	New England Whalers	Boston Garden; Attendance: 7,119

Box score
Gerry Cheevers	Goalies	Al Smith
3:15 (1st) – Ron Buchanan; 5:19 (1st) – Wayne Muloin / Goals / 6:19 (1st) – Tom Webster; 5:22 (2nd) – Larry Pleau; 8:47 (2nd) – Larry Pleau
31 (11–11–9)	Shots	34 (13–12–9)

April 21	New England Whalers	5–4 (2–1, 1–1, 2–2)	Cleveland Crusaders	Cleveland Arena; Attendance: 8,391

Box score
Al Smith	Goalies	Gerry Cheevers
9:38 (1st) – Guy Smith; 15:01 (1st) – Jim Dorey; 12:51 (2nd) – Larry Pleau; 11:47 (3rd) – Tim Sheehy; 18:04 (3rd) – Tim Sheehy / Goals / 13:35 (1st) – Gary Jarrett; 14:58 (2nd) – Ted Hodgson; 9:19 (3rd) – Ron Buchanan; 19:31 (3rd) – Ron Buchanan
27 (6–12–9)	Shots	21 (5–10–6)

April 22	New England Whalers	2–5 (1–2, 0–1, 1–2)	Cleveland Crusaders	Cleveland Arena; Attendance: 4,183

Box score
Al Smith	Goalies	Gerry Cheevers
3:26 (1st) – Tim Sheehy; 1:16 (3rd) – Larry Pleau / Goals / 3:11 (1st) – Ron Buchanan; 19:39 (1st) – Ron Buchanan; 10:17 (2nd) – Gary Jarrett; 6:33 (3rd) – Gary Jarrett; 15:21 (3rd) – Gary Jarrett
36 (8–17–11)	Shots	33 (13–9–11)

April 26	Cleveland Crusaders	1–3 (1–1, 0–1, 0–1)	New England Whalers	Boston Garden; Attendance: 7,689

Box score
Gerry Cheevers	Goalies	Al Smith
10:01 (1st) – Rich Pumple / Goals / 19:48 (1st) – Tim Sheehy; 16:36 (2nd) – Tommy Earl; 7:49 (3rd) – Brad Selwood
31 (12–10–9)	Shots	32 (9–16–7)

=== Western Division Final ===
==== (W1) Winnipeg Jets vs. (W2) Houston Aeros ====
Winnipeg went 6–2 against Houston in the regular season. Winnipeg dominated the Aeros for a large majority of the series, where they had a goal in all but three of the twelve combined periods and being tied in just two of them.

April 20	Houston Aeros	1–5 (0–3, 1–1, 0–1)	Winnipeg Jets	Winnipeg Arena; Attendance: 7,044

Box score
Wayne Rutledge	Goalies	Joe Daley
19:18 (3rd) – Duke Harris (D. McCallum) – sh / Goals / 8:13 (1st) – Bill Sutherland (B. Ash); 16:02 (1st) – Wally Boyer (M. Black, J. Zanussi); 18:09 (1st) – Danny Johnson (D. Asmundson, B. Hull); 1:42 (2nd) – Bobby Hull (B. Sutherland, N. Beaudin); 3:42 (3rd) – Wally Boyer
22 (6–8–8)	Shots	29 (12–9–8)

April 22	Houston Aeros	0–2 (0–0, 0–0, 0–2)	Winnipeg Jets	Winnipeg Arena; Attendance: 5,029

Box score
Don McLeod	Goalies	Ernie Wakely
No scoring / Goals / 15:29 (3rd) – Dunc Rousseau (L. Hornung, M. Black); 19:22 (3rd) – Norm Beaudin (C. Bordeleau) – en
28 (4–13–11)	Shots	27 (10–7–10)

April 24	Winnipeg Jets	4–2 (2–0, 1–0, 1–2)	Houston Aeros	Sam Houston Coliseum; Attendance: 6,722

Box score
Joe Daley	Goalies	Don McLeod
12:29 (1st) – Joe Zanussi; 19:59 (1st) – Norm Beaudin (B. Sutherland, B. Hull); 17:47 (2nd) – Bobby Hull (L. Hornung, A. McDonald) – pp 17:49 (3rd) – Christian Bordeleau (J. Zanussi) / Goals / 1:44 (3rd) – Ted Taylor (L. Lund, F. Hughes); 4:38 (3rd) – Jack Stanfield (K. Mortson, L. Hale)
22 (8–5–9)	Shots	40 (19–12–9)

April 26	Winnipeg Jets	3–0 (1–0, 0–0, 2–0)	Houston Aeros	Sam Houston Coliseum; Attendance: 6,362

Box score
Ernie Wakely	Goalies	Wayne Rutledge
14:20 (1st) – Norm Beaudin (L. Hornung); 4:33 (3rd) – Larry Hornung (D. Rousseau); 14:22 (3rd) – Norm Beaudin (B. Hull) / Goals / No scoring
32 (11–12–9)	Shots	25 (8–12–5)

== Avco Cup Final ==
=== (W1) Winnipeg Jets vs. (E1) New England Whalers ===
The first Avco Cup matched the Western Division champion Winnipeg Jets, as coached by player-coach Bobby Hull versus the Eastern Division champion New England Whalers, ascoached by Jack Kelley; in the regular season, the Whalers went 5–1 versus the Jets and were tabbed as slight favorites. 6,526 fans saw the first ever Avco Cup game at Boston Garden. Due to a conflict in dates with a circus, the Whalers hosted Game 1 while Winnipeg hosted Game 2 and Game 3 before the Whalers hosted Game 4 and Game 5. A potential Game 6 would've been "hosted" by the Jets in Toronto.

New England scored four goals in the opening period of Game 1 despite being outshot 14–7; Norm Beaudin scored the first Avco Cup Final goal at 10:02 in the first period for Winnipeg, but Rick Ley tied it for New England with a power play goal two minutes later as the first of the Whaler barrage. Tom Webster scored two goals in the game while Tommy Williams provided three assists in the resulting 7–2 victory. In Game 2, Winnipeg had two-goal leads in the first and second periods, but the Whalers shut them out in the third period while scoring five unanswered goals to win 7–4. 7,200 saw Game 3 in Winnipeg go into a tight finish, as a 3–0 Winnipeg lead was snapped by Rick Ley with just five minutes to go into the second period before goals by Ted Green and Tim Sheehy in the third period tied the game. But 37 seconds after the Sheehy goal, with 1:04 remaining in the game, Hull gave the Jets the go-ahead lead with his goal as the Jets held on to win Game 3.

Winnipeg had a lead in three of the five games, but the Whalers came back twice to go along with a powerful scoring attack that saw fourteen different players score a goal for the team in the series. Game 4 (with 13,967 attending fans) saw Winnipeg take an early lead on Bobby Hull's goal in the first period, but the Whalers scored two goals in the second period to take the lead before adding two more in the third period, with Mike Byers having two goals for the night. In Game 5 to 11,186 fans, New England took an early lead with Tom Webster scoring a goal 21 seconds into the game. Four minutes later, Larry Pleau scored a shorthanded goal to give them a 2–0 lead. The two teams then traded goals as the Whalers led 5–2 after one period. Winnipeg clawed back in the second period to narrow it to a 6–4 deficit, and Bob Woytowich got it to 6–5 with 15:01 remaining. But Larry Pleau responded for the Whalers with a goal just 45 seconds later at 5:44 that ended up being the series-winning goal to make it 7–5. He added another goal over a minute later to give New England an insurmountable 8–5 lead along with making him the first player to achieve a hat trick in the Avco Cup Final. The two teams traded goals for the remaining minutes. The victory for the Whalers was particularly satisfying for Whalers captain Ted Green, who had played for the NHL Boston Bruins at the Boston Garden the previous year when they won the Stanley Cup. Differing sources stated that Green and his teammates skated around with the Eastern Division championship trophy or a trophy acquired at a store, as the Avco World Trophy was not completed at the time.

New England won nine consecutive home playoff games. Howard Baldwin issued a challenge to the 1973 Stanley Cup champion for a one-game playoff on neutral ice to claim the Cup, but the league never responded.

April 29	New England Whalers	7–2	Winnipeg Jets	Boston Garden
12:10 – Rick Ley (Dorey, Webster); 14:07 – Tom Webster (Williams, Hurley); 16:13 – Tommy Earl (Sheehy, Green); 19:37 – John French		First period	10:02 – Norm Beaudin (Bordeleau, Hull)
10:55 – Tom Webster (Williams, Hurley); 16:01 – Tom Williams (French)		Second period	No scoring
3:45 – Jim Dorey (Sheehy, Earl)		Third period	11:07 – Bobby Hull
Al Smith 25 saves / 27 shots		Goalie stats	Joe Daley 18 saves / 25 shots

May 2	Winnipeg Jets	4–7	New England Whalers	Winnipeg Arena
0:33 – Norm Beaudin (Hull, Hornung); 19:20 – Christian Bordeleau (Hull, Beaudin)		First period	19:46 – Tom Williams (Webster, Dorey)
5:59 – Wally Boyer (Rousseau, Zanussi); 7:37 – Christian Bordeleau (Hull, Woytowich)		Second period	1:47 – Brad Selwood (Williams)
		Third period	2:19 – Jim Dorey (Williams, Webster); 3:08 – Brit Selby (Williams, Webster); 9:03 – John French (Ley, Sheehy); 10:16 – John Cunniff (Byers); 18:59 – en – John French (Hurley, Pleau)
Ernie Wakely 18 saves / 24 shots		Goalie stats	Al Smith 32 saves / 36 shots

May 3	Winnipeg Jets	4–3	New England Whalers	Winnipeg Arena
15:23 – Bobby Hull (Bordeleau, Beaudin); 19:34 – Ab McDonald (Beaudin, Hornung)		First period	No scoring
5:21 – Danny Johnson (Hull, Hornung)		Second period	14:44 – Rick Ley (Byers)
18:56 – Bobby Hull (Beaudin, Ash)		Third period	4:23 – Ted Green (Ley, Webster); 18:19 – Tim Sheehy (French, Dorey)
Joe Daley 27 saves / 30 shots		Goalie stats	Al Smith 23 saves / 27 shots

May 5	New England Whalers	2–4	Winnipeg Jets	Boston Garden
No scoring		First period	15:50 – Bobby Hull (Bordeleau)
0:47 – Larry Pleau (Sheehy, Ley); 14:11 – Mike Byers (Earl, Dorey); 16:17 – Tim Sheehy (Dorey, Selwood) 16:17		Second period	No scoring
7:17 – Mike Byers (Earl)		Third period	19:54 – Dunc Rousseau (Ash)
Al Smith 28 saves /30 shots		Goalie stats	Ernie Wakely 28 saves / 32 shots

May 6	New England Whalers	9–6	Winnipeg Jets	Boston Garden
0:21 – Tom Webster (Williams, Ley); 4:43 – sh – Larry Pleau; 11:47 – Guy Smith (Williams, Webster); 15:43 – Rick Ley; 18:41 – pp – Tim Sheehy (Webster, Pleau)		First period	7:07 – Danny Johnson (Sutherland); 17:53 – Norm Beaudin (Hull)
0:15 – Tom Webster (Williams, Green)		Second period	3:15 – pp – Norm Beaudin (Bordeleau, McDonald); 4:02 – Milt Black (Shmyr)
5:44 – Larry Pleau (Sheehy, French); 7:31 – Larry Pleau (Sheehy, French); 17:20 – en – Mike Byers (Green, Williams)		Third period	4:59 – Bob Woytowich (Swenson, Asmundson); 18:10 – Freeman Asmundson (Swenson, Cuddie)
Al Smith 38 saves / 44 shots		Goalie stats	Joe Daley 18 saves / 26 shots

New England won series 4–1

== Player statistics ==
=== Skaters ===
These were the top ten skaters based on points.

Player	Team	GP	G	A	Pts	PIM
Norm Beaudin	Winnipeg Jets	14	13	15	28	2
Tom Webster	New England Whalers	15	12	14	26	6
Bobby Hull	Winnipeg Jets	14	9	16	25	16
Tim Sheehy	New England Whalers	15	9	14	23	13
Jim Dorey	New England Whalers	15	3	16	19	41
Larry Pleau	New England Whalers	15	12	7	19	15
Tommy Williams	New England Whalers	15	6	11	17	2
John French	New England Whalers	15	3	11	14	2
Bill Sutherland	Winnipeg Jets	14	5	9	14	9
Christian Bordeleau	Winnipeg Jets	12	5	8	13	4

=== Goaltending ===
These were the top five goaltenders in terms of minutes.

Player	Team	GP	GA	SA	SV	SV%	SO	MIN
Al Smith	New England Whalers	15	49	430	381	.886	0	909
Gerry Cheevers	Cleveland Crusaders	9	22	278	256	.921	0	548
Wayne Rutledge	Houston Aeros	7	20	228	208	.912	0	423
Joe Daley	Winnipeg Jets	7	25	199	174	.874	0	422
Ernie Wakely	Winnipeg Jets	7	22	210	188	.895	2	420

== Championship roster ==
1972–73 New England Whalers

=== Players ===
Centres

- John Danby
- Terry Caffery
- John French
- Tommy Williams
- Tim Sheehy

Wingers

- John Cunniff
- Kevin Ahearn
- Brit Selby
- Larry Pleau
- Guy Smith
- Tommy Earl
- Mike Byers
- Tom Webster

Defencemen

- Ric Jordan
- Ted Green (Captain)
- Paul Hurley
- Brad Selwood
- Rick Ley
- Jim Dorey

Goaltenders

- Al Smith
- Bruce Landon

=== Coaching and administrative staff ===
- Jack Kelley
