= List of New England Whalers players =

This is a list of players who played at least one game for the New England Whalers (1972–73 to 1978–79) of the World Hockey Association (WHA). For a list of players who played for the Whalers in the National Hockey League, see List of Hartford Whalers players.

== Key ==
- † Won a Avco World Trophy with the Whalers

General abbreviations
Abbreviation	Definition
GP	Games played
HHOF	Inducted into the Hockey Hall of Fame as a player
AWT	Won the Avco World Trophy with the team, followed by year(s) won

Goaltender statistical abbreviations
Abbreviation	Definition
W	Wins
L	Losses
T	Ties
SO	Shutouts
GAA	Goals against average

Skater statistical abbreviations
Abbreviation	Definition
Pos	Position
G	Goals
A	Assists
P	Points
PIM	Penalty minutes
D	Defense
LW	Left wing
C	Center
RW	Right wing

== Goaltenders ==
Goaltenders who played for the New England Whalers
Name	Seasons (Note: The seasons column lists the first year of the season of the player's first game and the last year of the season of the player's last game. For example, a player who played one game in the 1972–1973 season would be listed as playing with the team from 1972–1973, regardless of what calendar year the game occurred within.)	Regular season						Playoffs					Notes
Name	Seasons	GP	W	L	T	SO	GAA	GP	W	L	SO	GAA	Notes
Christer Abrahamsson	1974–1977	102	41	46	7	3	3.58	3	–	–	0	–	
Bill Berglund	1973–1975	5	2	1	0	0	3.61	–	–	–	–	–	
Gaye Cooley	1975–1976	–	–	–	–	–	–	1	–	–	0	–	
John Garrett	1978–1979	41	20	17	4	2	3.58	8	–	–	0	–	
Paul Hoganson	1975–1976	4	1	2	0	0	4.29	–	–	–	–	–	
Bruce Landon†	1972–1977	122	50	50	9	2	3.46	8	–	–	0	–	AWT: 1973
Jean-Louis Levasseur	1977–1978	27	14	11	2	3	3.30	–	–	–	–	–	
Ted Ouimet	1974–1975	1	0	0	0	0	9.00	–	–	–	–	–	
Cap Raeder	1975–1977	29	12	11	1	2	3.24	15	–	–	2	–	
Al Smith†	1972–1979	260	141	98	15	10	3.25	35	–	–	1	–	AWT: 1973

== Skaters ==
Skaters who played for the New England Whalers
Name	Pos	Seasons	Regular season					Playoffs					Notes
Name	Pos	Seasons	GP	G	A	P	PIM	GP	G	A	P	PIM	Notes
Thommy Abrahamsson	D	1974–1977	203	28	67	95	126	28	2	7	9	15	
Kevin Ahearn†	LW	1972–1973	78	20	22	42	18	14	1	2	3	9	AWT: 1973
Mike Antonovich	C	1976–1979	170	64	71	135	77	29	17	12	29	22	
Danny Arndt	LW	1975–1977	115	16	22	38	21	8	0	0	0	0	
Ralph Backstrom	C	1975–1977	115	31	50	81	36	20	5	4	9	8	
Don Blackburn	LW	1973–1976	146	40	74	114	34	12	3	6	9	6	
Danny Bolduc	RW	1975–1978	88	15	13	28	51	30	3	10	13	8	
Don Borgeson	LW	1975–1976	31	9	8	17	4	3	1	1	2	0	
Jeff Brubaker	LW	1978–1979	12	0	0	0	19	3	0	0	0	12	
Ron Busniuk	D	1975–1977	66	1	12	13	196	17	0	2	2	14	
Bill Butters	D	1976–1978	71	2	21	23	134	5	0	1	1	15	
Mike Byers†	RW	1972–1976	187	61	54	115	20	25	10	11	21	20	AWT: 1973
Terry Caffery†	C	1972–1976	143	54	98	152	26	8	3	7	10	0	AWT: 1973
Brett Callighen	RW	1976–1977	33	6	10	16	41	–	–	–	–	–	
Wayne Carleton	C	1974–1976	108	47	60	107	56	6	2	5	7	0	
Jack Carlson	LW	1976–1979	136	18	32	50	334	14	2	2	4	23	
Steve Carlson	C	1976–1978	69	10	16	26	51	18	2	7	9	11	
Greg Carroll	C	1977–1978	48	9	14	23	27	–	–	–	–	–	
Bob Charlebois	LW	1973–1976	110	8	10	18	6	11	1	0	1	4	
Ron Climie	LW	1974–1977	93	33	24	57	29	6	3	0	3	0	
John Cunniff†	LW	1972–1974	63	10	10	20	30	18	2	2	4	2	AWT: 1973
John Danby†	C	1972–1976	150	16	25	41	16	19	1	1	2	0	AWT: 1973
Jim Dorey†	D	1972–1975	183	18	113	131	272	21	3	22	25	67	AWT: 1973
Jordy Douglas	C	1978–1979	51	6	10	16	15	10	4	0	4	23	
Tommy Earl†	RW	1972–1977	347	40	56	96	116	46	3	11	14	28	AWT: 1973
Nick Fotiu	LW	1974–1976	110	5	4	9	238	20	5	2	7	84	
John French†	C	1972–1975	226	60	124	184	102	26	8	15	23	4	AWT: 1973
Marty Gateman	D	1975–1976	12	0	1	1	6	–	–	–	–	–	
Ted Green†	D	1972–1975	210	29	70	99	118	22	1	9	10	27	AWT: 1973
Alan Hangsleben	D	1974–1979	334	36	73	109	437	47	4	12	16	97	
Dave Hanson	D	1976–1977	1	0	0	0	9	1	0	0	0	0	
Hugh Harris	LW	1973–1974	75	24	28	52	78	7	0	4	4	11	
Gordie Howe	RW	1977–1979	134	53	86	139	136	24	8	6	14	19	HHOF – 1972
Mark Howe	LW	1977–1979	147	72	126	198	64	20	12	9	21	24	HHOF – 2011
Marty Howe	D	1977–1979	141	19	25	44	97	23	1	2	3	21	
Paul Hurley†	D	1972–1976	251	9	66	75	135	21	0	8	8	18	AWT: 1973
Mike Hyndman	RW	1972–1973	59	4	14	18	21	–	–	–	–	–	
Dave Hynes	LW	1976–1977	22	5	4	9	4	–	–	–	–	–	
Dave Inkpen	D	1978–1979	41	0	7	7	15	5	0	1	1	4	
Ric Jordan†	D	1972–1974	68	1	8	9	26	11	0	0	0	6	AWT: 1973
Al Karlander	C	1973–1975	125	27	55	82	48	12	1	6	7	2	
Mike Keeler	D	1973–1974	1	0	0	0	0	1	0	0	0	0	
Dave Keon	C	1976–1979	190	60	106	166	12	29	11	21	32	6	HHOF – 1986
Andre Lacroix	C	1978–1979	78	32	56	88	34	10	4	4	8	0	
Rick Ley†	D	1972–1979	478	35	210	245	716	73	7	33	40	142	AWT: 1973
George Lyle	LW	1976–1979	202	86	75	161	190	26	6	6	12	42	
Gary MacGregor	C	1976–1977	30	8	8	16	4	–	–	–	–	–	
Bryan Maxwell	D	1977–1978	17	2	1	3	11	–	–	–	–	–	
Jim Mayer	D	1977–1978	51	11	9	20	21	–	–	–	–	–	
John McKenzie	RW	1976–1979	189	57	76	133	201	29	11	14	25	34	
Bob McManama	C	1975–1976	37	3	10	13	28	12	4	3	7	4	
Gerry Methe	D	1974–1975	5	0	1	1	4	2	0	0	0	0	
Warren Miller	RW	1978–1979	77	26	23	49	44	10	0	8	8	28	
Fred O'Donnell	RW	1974–1976	155	32	26	58	165	20	2	5	7	35	
Rosaire Paiement	C	1975–1977	93	33	45	78	101	17	4	11	15	41	
Andre Peloffy	C	1977–1978	10	2	0	2	2	2	0	0	0	0	
Larry Pleau†	LW	1972–1979	468	157	215	372	180	66	29	22	51	42	AWT: 1973
Ron Plumb	D	1977–1979	105	5	25	30	51	23	2	8	10	16	
Steve Richardson	LW	1975–1976	6	0	0	0	0	–	–	–	–	–	
Doug Roberts	D	1975–1977	140	7	31	38	84	19	1	1	2	8	
Gordie Roberts	D	1975–1979	311	42	144	186	502	46	4	20	24	79	
Mike Rogers	C	1975–1979	274	98	159	257	97	46	13	21	34	14	
Pierre Roy	D	1978–1979	1	0	0	0	2	–	–	–	–	–	
Dick Sarrazin	RW	1972–1973	35	4	7	11	0	–	–	–	–	–	
Brit Selby†	LW	1972–1973	65	13	29	42	48	13	3	4	7	13	AWT: 1973
Brad Selwood†	D	1972–1979	431	42	143	185	556	63	6	12	18	81	AWT: 1973
Tim Sheehy†	C	1972–1978	232	91	91	182	84	35	14	19	33	26	AWT: 1973
Dale Smedsmo	LW	1976–1977	15	2	0	2	54	–	–	–	–	–	
Guy Smith†	RW	1972–1974	38	4	8	12	31	11	2	0	2	4	AWT: 1973
Blaine Stoughton	RW	1978–1979	36	9	3	12	2	7	4	3	7	4	
Garry Swain	C	1974–1977	171	22	33	55	70	25	3	5	8	56	
Jim Troy	RW	1975–1977	21	0	0	0	50	2	0	0	0	29	
Jim Warner	RW	1978–1979	41	6	9	15	20	1	0	0	0	0	
Tom Webster†	RW	1972–1978	352	220	205	425	241	43	28	26	54	19	AWT: 1973
Tom Williams†	C	1972–1974	139	31	58	89	20	19	6	14	20	12	AWT: 1973
