= Yves Archambault =

Canadian ice hockey player (born 1952)

- Born: June 22, 1952 (age 74) Montreal, Quebec, Canada
- Height: 5 ft 11 in (180 cm)
- Weight: 180 lb (82 kg; 12 st 12 lb)
- Position: Goaltender
- Caught: Left
- Played for: Philadelphia Blazers; Vancouver Blazers
- NHL draft: 110th overall, 1972; Montreal Canadiens
- Playing career: 1972–1977

Yves Archambault (born June 22, 1952, in Montreal, Quebec) is a Canadian former professional ice hockey goaltender.

== Early life ==
Archambault was born in Montreal. As a youth, he played in the 1965 Quebec International Pee-Wee Hockey Tournament with a minor ice hockey team from Montreal.

== Career ==
Archambault played 11 games in the World Hockey Association (WHA) with the Philadelphia and Vancouver Blazers. His career goals against average was 5.05. He played in the 1973 WHA playoffs when Bernie Parent departed the team after Game 1 of the playoffs against the Cleveland Crusaders, entering in for Marcel Paille in the middle of Game 2 and playing for 153 minutes, going 0–2 while allowing 11 goals.

Since retirement from professional hockey, Archambault has worked as a sports agent in Anjou, Quebec.

== Career statistics ==
=== Regular season and playoffs ===
			Regular season									Playoffs
Season	Team	League	GP	W	L	T	MIN	GA	SO	GAA	SV%	GP	W	L	MIN	GA	SO	GAA	SV%
1969–70	St. Jerome Alouettes	QMJHL	19	—	—	—	—	102	1	4.58	.863	13	–	–	–	–	–	–	–
1970–71	St. Jerome Alouettes	QMJHL	24	—	—	—	—	107	1	4.46	.899	1	–	–	–	–	–	–	–
1971–72	Sorel Black Hawks	QMJHL	33	—	—	—	—	113	0	3.57	.904	4	–	–	–	–	–	–	–
1972–73	St. Jerome Alouettes	QMJHL	6	—	—	—	—	60	0	10.00	.793	–	–	–	–	–	–	–	–
1972–73	Roanoke Valley Rebels	EHL	30	—	—	—	—	104	2	3.51	–	3	–	–	–	–	–	–	–
1972–73	Philadelphia Blazers	WHA	6	1	3	0	260	17	0	3.92	.861	3	0	2	153	11	0	4.31	.833
1973–74	Roanoke Valley Rebels	SHL	15	7	5	0	717	44	0	3.68	.889	11	–	–	–	–	–	–	–
1973–74	Vancouver Blazers	WHA	5	1	4	0	263	27	0	6.14	.852	–	–	–	–	–	–	–	–
1974–75	Roanoke Valley Rebels	SHL	34	15	19	0	1898	129	0	4.08	.889	1	–	–	–	–	–	–	–
1975–76	Beauce Jaros	NAHL	33	21	6	1	1817	123	0	4.06	–	11	8	3	665	53	0	4.78	–
1976–77	Tidewater Sharks	SHL	25	14	6	2	1317	63	1	2.87	.910	–	–	–	–	–	–	–	–
1976–77	Philadelphia Firebirds	NAHL	3	1	2	0	193	13	0	4.04	.883	–	–	–	–	–	–	–	–
WHA totals			11	2	7	0	523	44	0	5.05	.856	3	0	2	153	11	0	4.31	.833
