= 1968 Memorial Cup =

Canadian junior ice hockey championship

Tournament details
- Dates: May 1968
- Teams: 11

Final positions
- Champions: Niagara Falls Flyers (OHA) (2nd title)

The Memorial Cup trophy

The 1968 Memorial Cup was the 50th annual Memorial Cup competition, organized by the Canadian Amateur Hockey Association (CAHA) to determine the champion of junior A ice hockey. The George Richardson Memorial Trophy champions Niagara Falls Flyers of the Ontario Hockey Association in Eastern Canada competed against the Abbott Cup champions Estevan Bruins of the Western Canada Junior Hockey League in Western Canada. In a best-of-seven series, held at the Niagara Falls Memorial Arena in Niagara Falls, Ontario and at the Montreal Forum in Montreal, Quebec, Niagara Falls won their 2nd Memorial Cup, defeating Estevan 4 games to 1.

CAHA vice-president Lloyd Pollock oversaw the schedule, and used the Montreal Forum to increase profits for CAHA, since Maple Leaf Gardens was not available and due to the smaller size of the Niagara Falls Memorial Arena.

== Scores ==
- Game 1: Niagara Falls 7-4 Estevan
- Game 2: Estevan 4-2 Niagara Falls (in Montreal)
- Game 3: Niagara Falls 7-4 Estevan
- Game 4: Niagara Falls 4-3 Estevan (2OT)
- Game 5: Niagara Falls 6-0 Estevan

== Winning roster ==
Steve Atkinson, Doug Brindley, Russ Frieson, Karl Haggarty, Doug Keeler, Mike Keeler, Rick Ley, Don Makey, Phil Myre, Jim Notman, Phil Roberto, Ron Schwindt, Brad Selwood, Garry Swain, Don Tannahill, Dave Tataryn, Rick Thompson, Ross Webley, Tom Webster. Coach: Paul Emms

== National Playoff Tree ==
Opening Round	Quarter-finals
BC	Penticton	4
AB	Edmonton	1
Western Canada
SK	Estevan	4
NWO	Fort William	1
MB	St. James	2
NWO	Fort William	4
Eastern Canada
NEO	North Bay	3
EO	Cornwall	4
EO	Cornwall	0
QC	Verdun	4
QC	Verdun	4
AC	Halifax	0

Semi-finals
BC	Penticton	0
SK	Estevan	4
SO	Niagara Falls	3
QC	Verdun	2

Memorial Cup
SK	Estevan	1
ON	Niagara Falls	4

=== Additional Interleague Playdowns ===
Halifax Canadiens defeated Fredericton Red Wings 4-games-to-2 (Atlantic Canada Final)
Fort William Westfort Hurricanes defeated Nip-Rock Rangers 3-games-to-none (Northwestern Ontario Final)
Verdun Maple Leafs defeated Chicoutimi Saguenéens 3-games-to-1 (Quebec SF)
Verdun Maple Leafs defeated Drummondville Rangers 3-games-to-1 (Quebec Final)

== Roll of League Champions ==
Western Canada - Abbott Cup playdowns

British Columbia (BC)

- BCJHL: Penticton Broncos

Alberta (AB)

- AJHL: Edmonton Movers

Saskatchewan (SK)

- WCHL: Estevan Bruins

Manitoba (MB)

- MJHL: St. James Canadians

Northwestern Ontario (NWO)

- NWOJHL: Nip-Rock Rangers
- TBJHL: Fort William Westfort Hurricanes

Eastern Canada - George Richardson Memorial Trophy playdowns

Ontario (ON)

- Eastern Ontario (EO) - CJHL: Cornwall Royals
- Northeastern Ontario (NEO) - NOJHA: North Bay Trappers
- Southern Ontario (SO) - OHA: Niagara Falls Flyers

Quebec (QC)

- LHJP: Drummondville Rangers
- LHJSLS: Chicoutimi Saguenéens
- LHJMM: Verdun Maple Leafs

Atlantic Canada (AC)

- New Brunswick - Fredericton Red Wings (Independent)
- Nova Scotia - Halifax Canadiens (Independent)
