= Norm Beaudin =

Canadian ice hockey player (born 1941)

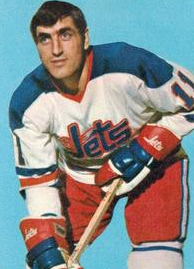
- Born: November 28, 1941 (age 84) Montmartre, Saskatchewan, Canada
- Height: 5 ft 9 in (175 cm)
- Weight: 170 lb (77 kg; 12 st 2 lb)
- Position: Right wing
- Shot: Right
- Played for: St. Louis Blues; Minnesota North Stars; Winnipeg Jets; SC Langnau; HC Sierre
- NHL draft: Undrafted
- Playing career: 1962–1979

Norman Joseph Andrew Beaudin (born November 28, 1941) is a Canadian former professional ice hockey forward. Between 1962 and 1979, he played two short stints in the National Hockey League and spent most of his major league career in the World Hockey Association with the Winnipeg Jets. He spent the rest of his career in the minor leagues and the Swiss Nationalliga A. He owned two hockey stores in Florida.

== Minor leagues ==
In four years in the junior leagues, Beaudin played twice for the Memorial Cup: in 1961 with the Regina Pats of the Saskatchewan Junior Hockey League, and in 1962 with the Edmonton Oil Kings. In 1962, Beaudin signed with the Montreal Canadiens and played with their farm team in Hull-Ottawa. It is there that he accomplished the rare feat of scoring a goal in the same game that he served as an emergency goaltender. In 1963 he was claimed in the waiver draft by the Detroit Red Wings and played the next four seasons with their farm clubs, the Pittsburgh Hornets and the Memphis Wings. In 1967, he was claimed by the St. Louis Blues in the expansion draft, and made his NHL debut that year; he spent most of the season with the Blues' Kansas City affiliate. He was loaned to the American Hockey League Buffalo Bisons in 1968, and then played three seasons for the Cleveland Barons of the AHL. At that time, his rights were traded to the Minnesota North Stars, for whom he played 12 games in 1970-71.

== WHA career ==
Beaudin was the first player signed by the Winnipeg Jets of the newly established World Hockey Association, and he played on a line nicknamed the Luxury Line with superstar left winger Bobby Hull and centre Christian Bordeleau in the Jets' inaugural season. He had his best pro season by far, scoring 38 goals and 65 assists for 103 points, and was named to play in the WHA's first All-Star Game in 1973. He led the WHA playoffs in scoring that year with 13 goals and 15 assists, including seven points in one game against the Minnesota Fighting Saints.

Beaudin's production dropped sharply the next season, and in 1974 he and Bordeleau were replaced as Hull's linemates by Swedish stars Anders Hedberg and Ulf Nilsson. After the Jets won the AVCO World Trophy in 1976, Beaudin signed with Swiss team SC Langnau, with whom he played for two seasons before retiring.

=== Biography ===
A biography of his career, The Original: Living Life Through Hockey, was published in 2022.

=== Regular season and playoffs ===
| | | | Regular season | | | | | Playoffs |
| Season | Team | League | GP | G | A | Pts | PIM | GP | G | A | Pts | PIM |
|---|---|---|---|---|---|---|---|---|---|---|---|---|
| 1959–60 | Regina Pats | SJHL | 58 | 25 | 32 | 57 | 18 | 13 | 7 | 2 | 9 | 4 |
| 1960–61 | Regina Pats | SJHL | 60 | 39 | 40 | 79 | 23 | 16 | 12 | 6 | 18 | 6 |
| 1960–61 | Regina Pats | M-Cup | — | — | — | — | — | 6 | 3 | 0 | 3 | 0 |
| 1961–62 | Regina Pats | SJHL | 54 | 58 | 30 | 88 | 22 | 16 | 14 | 6 | 20 | 2 |
| 1961–62 | Spokane Comets | WHL | — | — | — | — | — | 4 | 1 | 3 | 4 | 0 |
| 1961–62 | Edmonton Oil Kings | M-Cup | — | — | — | — | — | 4 | 3 | 2 | 5 | 4 |
| 1962–63 | Hull-Ottawa Canadiens | EPHL | 72 | 19 | 22 | 41 | 16 | 3 | 1 | 0 | 1 | 2 |
| 1963–64 | Pittsburgh Hornets | AHL | 13 | 4 | 2 | 6 | 2 | 5 | 1 | 3 | 4 | 4 |
| 1964–65 | Memphis Wings | CHL | 53 | 42 | 24 | 66 | 28 | — | — | — | — | — |
| 1964–65 | Pittsburgh Hornets | AHL | 13 | 4 | 2 | 6 | 2 | 2 | 1 | 0 | 1 | 0 |
| 1965–66 | Pittsburgh Hornets | AHL | 70 | 29 | 29 | 58 | 35 | 3 | 1 | 1 | 2 | 0 |
| 1966–67 | Memphis Wings | CHL | 65 | 39 | 37 | 76 | 32 | 7 | 4 | 3 | 7 | 0 |
| 1967–68 | St. Louis Blues | NHL | 13 | 1 | 1 | 2 | 4 | — | — | — | — | — |
| 1967–68 | Kansas City Blues | CHL | 59 | 22 | 23 | 45 | 26 | 7 | 5 | 7 | 12 | 5 |
| 1968–69 | Buffalo Bisons | AHL | 74 | 32 | 39 | 71 | 10 | 6 | 1 | 3 | 4 | 7 |
| 1969–70 | Cleveland Barons | AHL | 70 | 34 | 44 | 81 | 10 | — | — | — | — | — |
| 1970–71 | Minnesota North Stars | NHL | 12 | 0 | 1 | 1 | 0 | — | — | — | — | — |
| 1970–71 | Cleveland Barons | AHL | 59 | 27 | 48 | 75 | 39 | 8 | 2 | 2 | 4 | 4 |
| 1971–72 | Cleveland Barons | AHL | 75 | 33 | 33 | 66 | 16 | 5 | 2 | 1 | 3 | 4 |
| 1972–73 | Winnipeg Jets | WHA | 78 | 38 | 65 | 103 | 15 | 14 | 13 | 15 | 28 | 2 |
| 1973–74 | Winnipeg Jets | WHA | 74 | 27 | 28 | 55 | 8 | 4 | 3 | 1 | 4 | 2 |
| 1974–75 | Winnipeg Jets | WHA | 79 | 16 | 31 | 47 | 8 | — | — | — | — | — |
| 1975–76 | Winnipeg Jets | WHA | 80 | 16 | 31 | 47 | 38 | 13 | 2 | 3 | 5 | 10 |
| 1976–77 | SC Langnau | NLA | 27 | 27 | 11 | 38 | — | — | — | — | — | — |
| 1977–78 | SC Langnau | NLA | 28 | 20 | 11 | 31 | — | — | — | — | — | — |
| 1978–79 | HC Sierre | NLA | — | — | — | — | — | — | — | — | — | — |
| WHA totals | | | 311 | 97 | 155 | 252 | 69 | 31 | 18 | 19 | 37 | 14 |
| NHL totals | | | 25 | 1 | 2 | 3 | 4 | — | — | — | — | — |
