= Grant Erickson =

Canadian ice hockey player

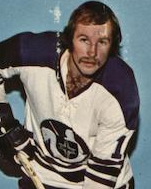
- Erickson in 1972–73
- Born: April 28, 1947 Pierceland, Saskatchewan, Canada
- Died: April 15, 2025 (aged 77) Cobble Hill, British Columbia, Canada
- Height: 5 ft 9 in (175 cm)
- Weight: 165 lb (75 kg; 11 st 11 lb)
- Position: Left wing
- Shot: Left
- Played for: Boston Bruins; Minnesota North Stars; Cleveland Crusaders; Phoenix Roadrunners
- Playing career: 1967–1977

Grant Charles Erickson (April 28, 1947 – April 15, 2025) was a Canadian professional ice hockey player who played 266 games in the World Hockey Association and 6 games in the National Hockey League between 1968 and 1976. He played for the Boston Bruins, Minnesota North Stars, Cleveland Crusaders, and Phoenix Roadrunners.

His lone NHL goal came on December 29, 1968 as a member of the Boston Bruins in a 3-3 tie versus Detroit at Olympia Stadium. Erickson died in Cobble Hill, British Columbia, on April 15, 2025.

== Career statistics ==
=== Regular season and playoffs ===
			Regular season					Playoffs
Season	Team	League	GP	G	A	Pts	PIM	GP	G	A	Pts	PIM
1965–66	Estevan Bruins	SJHL	57	30	20	50	22	25	2	13	15	12
1966–467	Estevan Bruins	CMJHL	55	35	49	84	49	13	6	8	14	8
1967–68	Oklahoma City Blazers	CHL	70	27	34	61	65	1	0	1	1	0
1968–69	Boston Bruins	NHL	2	1	0	1	0	—	—	—	—	—
1968–69	Oklahoma City Blazers	CHL	64	28	37	65	66	4	3	2	5	0
1969–70	Minnesota North Stars	NHL	4	0	0	0	0	—	—	—	—	—
1969–70	Iowa Stars	CHL	68	31	38	69	67	11	6	3	9	16
1970–71	Cleveland Barons	AHL	57	18	25	43	41	8	3	0	3	4
1971–72	Cleveland Barons	AHL	76	26	24	50	45	5	0	0	0	4
1972–73	Cleveland Crusaders	WHA	77	15	29	44	23	9	2	1	3	2
1973–74	Cleveland Crusaders	WHA	78	23	27	50	26	—	—	—	—	—
1974–75	Cleveland Crusaders	WHA	78	12	15	27	24	5	0	0	0	0
1975–76	Syracuse Blazers	NAHL	9	5	2	7	6	—	—	—	—	—
1975–76	Phoenix Roadrunners	WHA	33	4	7	11	6	5	0	2	2	0
1975–76	Tucson Mavericks	CHL	29	12	10	22	16	—	—	—	—	—
1976–77	Rhode Island Reds	AHL	27	3	9	12	11	—	—	—	—	—
1976–77	Oklahoma City Blazers	CHL	22	6	10	16	2	—	—	—	—	—
WHA totals			266	54	78	132	79	19	2	3	5	2
NHL totals			6	1	0	1	0	—	—	—	—	—
