= Dunc Rousseau =

Canadian ice hockey player

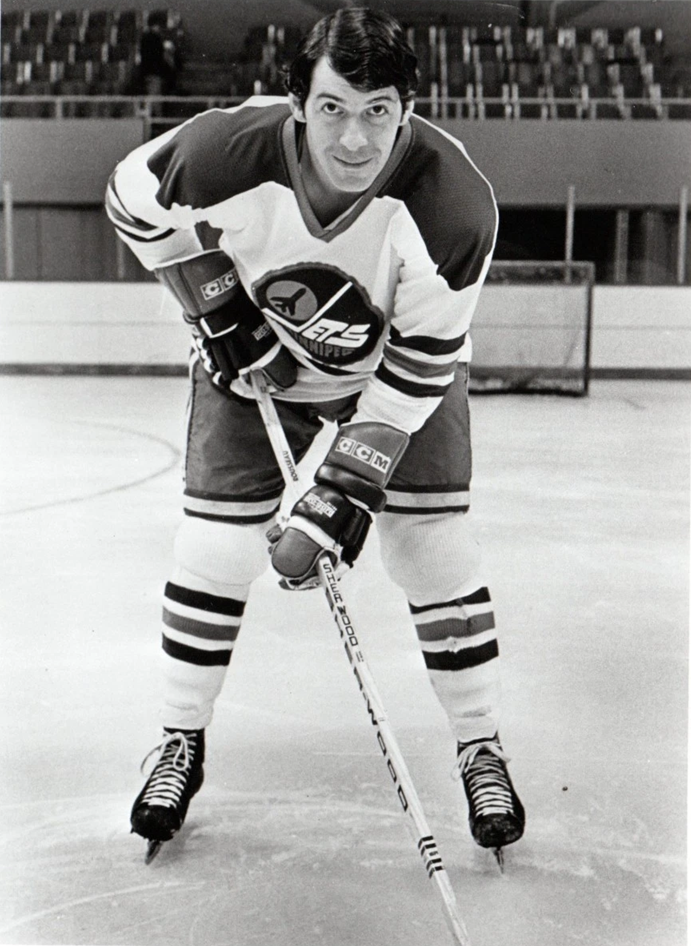
- Rousseau in 1973 photo
- Born: February 10, 1945 Bissett, Manitoba, Canada
- Died: October 18, 2017 (aged 72) Winnipeg, Manitoba, Canada
- Height: 6 ft 0 in (183 cm)
- Weight: 195 lb (88 kg; 13 st 13 lb)
- Position: Left wing
- Shot: Left
- Played for: Winnipeg Jets
- Playing career: 1962–1976

Duncan Franklin Rousseau (February 10, 1945 – October 18, 2017) was a Canadian professional ice hockey forward. He played 135 games in the World Hockey Association (WHA) with the Winnipeg Jets.

Rousseau died of cancer on October 18, 2017, aged 72, at Riverview Health Centre in Winnipeg, Manitoba.

== Career statistics ==
=== Regular season and playoffs ===
			Regular season					Playoffs
Season	Team	League	GP	G	A	Pts	PIM	GP	G	A	Pts	PIM
1962–63	Winnipeg Braves	MJHL	Statistics Unavailable
1963–64	Winnipeg Braves	MJHL	Statistics Unavailable
1964–65	Minneapolis Bruins	CPHL	5	1	2	3	8	—	—	—	—	—
1965–66	Oklahoma City Blazers	CPHL	40	0	2	2	24	3	0	0	0	2
1967–68	Dayton Gems	IHL	67	21	39	60	148	6	1	1	2	6
1968–69	Dayton Gems	IHL	70	35	53	88	172	9	10	9	19	25
1969–70	Dayton Gems	IHL	46	23	26	49	156	13	5	5	10	14
1970–71	Springfield Kings	AHL	51	10	15	25	69	12	1	2	3	8
1971–72	Baltimore Clippers	AHL	66	12	9	21	96	15	4	3	7	61
1972–73	Winnipeg Jets	WHA	75	16	17	33	75	14	3	2	5	2
1973–74	Winnipeg Jets	WHA	60	10	8	18	39	4	0	0	0	0
1974–75	Baltimore Clippers	AHL	46	12	22	34	84	—	—	—	—	—
1974–75	Rochester Americans	AHL	30	11	21	32	39	12	1	9	10	16
1975–76	Rochester Americans	AHL	67	13	18	31	96	5	0	1	1	12
WHA totals			135	26	25	51	114	18	3	2	5	2

== Awards and achievements ==
- MJHL Second All-Star Team (1965)
- Turnbull Cup MJHL Championship (1965)
