= Wally Boyer =

Canadian ice hockey player (b. 1937)

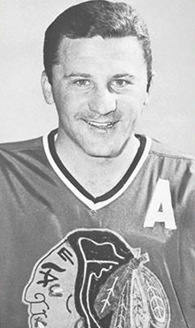
- Boyer in 1966-67 photo
- Born: September 27, 1937 (age 88) Cowan, Manitoba, Canada
- Height: 5 ft 07 in (170 cm)
- Weight: 160 lb (73 kg; 11 st 6 lb)
- Position: Centre
- Shot: Left
- Played for: Pittsburgh Penguins; Toronto Maple Leafs; Oakland Seals; Chicago Black Hawks; Winnipeg Jets
- Playing career: 1965–1973

Walter Boyer (born September 27, 1937) is a Canadian former professional ice hockey centre. He played in the National Hockey League with four teams between 1965 and 1971 and in the World Hockey Association during the 1972–73 season.

== Career ==
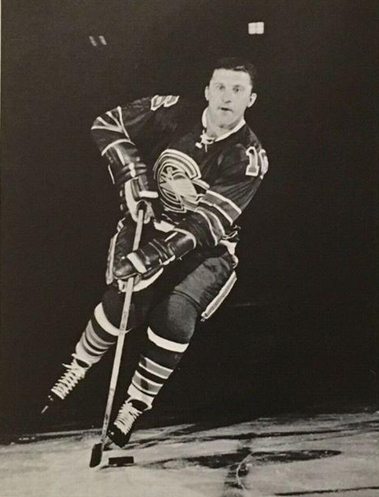
1967 photo of Boyer for the California Seals

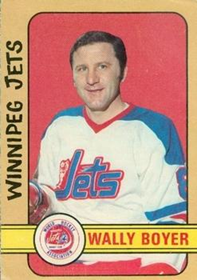
1972-73 OPC card of Boyer for the Winnipeg Jets

Wally Boyer was known as a creative playmaker and talented penalty killer throughout his National Hockey League career. Boyer recorded 54 goals and 105 assists for 159 points in 365 career NHL games. A product of the Toronto Maple Leafs' development system, Boyer played his first NHL games with the Leafs during the mid-1960s, before joining the Chicago Black Hawks. At the end of the 1966–67 season, the Hawks won the Prince of Wales Trophy for finishing first overall in the six-team standings. When the league expanded to 12 clubs that fall, Boyer joined the Oakland Seals and was later traded to another expansion franchise, the Pittsburgh Penguins.

== Career statistics ==
=== Regular season and playoffs ===
			Regular season					Playoffs
Season	Team	League	GP	G	A	Pts	PIM	GP	G	A	Pts	PIM
1955–56	Toronto Marlboros	OHA	48	14	19	33	51	11	2	2	4	4
1955–56	Toronto Marlboros	M-Cup	—	—	—	—	—	13	3	7	10	2
1956–57	Toronto Marlboros	OHA	40	17	17	34	21	8	2	6	8	19
1957–58	Toronto Marlboros	OHA	27	11	11	22	17	12	6	14	20	17
1957–58	Toronto Marlboros	M-Cup	—	—	—	—	—	5	0	2	2	2
1958–59	Hershey Bears	AHL	4	0	1	1	2	—	—	—	—	—
1958–59	Chicoutimi Sagueneens	QSHL	28	3	7	10	8	4	0	0	0	0
1958–59	New Westminster Royals	WHL	27	5	5	10	0	—	—	—	—	—
1959–60	Sudbury Wolves	EPHL	70	23	42	65	36	11	2	4	6	4
1960–61	Rochester Americans	AHL	70	24	33	57	31	—	—	—	—	—
1961–62	Rochester Americans	AHL	67	20	21	41	67	2	0	0	0	0
1962–63	Springfield Indians	AHL	66	28	45	73	59	—	—	—	—	—
1963–64	Rochester Americans	AHL	52	20	19	39	35	2	1	0	1	2
1964–65	Rochester Americans	AHL	70	20	41	61	28	10	2	4	6	4
1965–66	Rochester Americans	AHL	19	3	10	13	13	—	—	—	—	—
1965–66	Toronto Maple Leafs	NHL	46	4	17	21	23	4	0	1	1	0
1966–67	Chicago Black Hawks	NHL	42	5	6	11	15	1	0	0	0	0
1966–67	Portland Buckaroos	WHL	17	7	6	13	10	—	—	—	—	—
1967–68	California/Oakland Seals	NHL	74	13	20	33	44	—	—	—	—	—
1968–69	Pittsburgh Penguins	NHL	62	10	19	29	17	—	—	—	—	—
1969–70	Pittsburgh Penguins	NHL	72	11	12	23	34	10	1	2	3	0
1970–71	Pittsburgh Penguins	NHL	68	11	30	41	30	—	—	—	—	—
1971–72	Pittsburgh Penguins	NHL	1	0	1	1	0	—	—	—	—	—
1971–72	Hershey Bears	AHL	64	18	30	48	43	3	1	0	1	2
1972–73	Winnipeg Jets	WHA	69	6	28	34	27	14	4	2	6	4
WHA totals			69	6	28	34	27	14	4	2	6	4
AHL totals			412	133	200	333	278	17	4	4	8	8
NHL totals			365	54	105	159	163	15	1	3	4	0

== Awards and achievements ==
- Memorial Cup Championship (1956)
- Calder Cup (AHL) Championship (1965)
- Honoured Member of the Manitoba Hockey Hall of Fame
