= Tom Williams (ice hockey, born 1940) =

American ice hockey player (1940 – 1992)

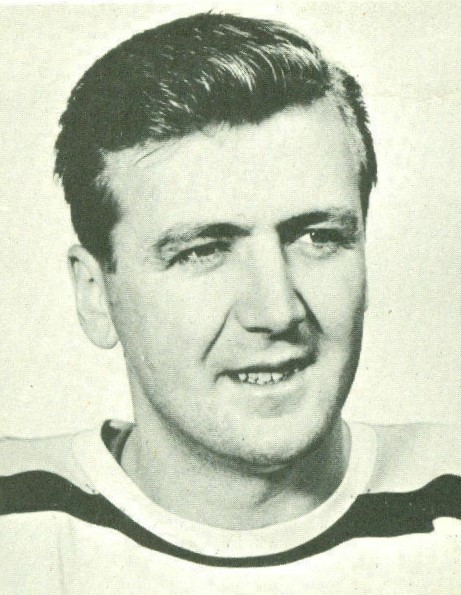
- Born: April 17, 1940 Duluth, Minnesota, U.S.
- Died: February 8, 1992 (aged 51) Hudson, Massachusetts, U.S.
- Height: 5 ft 11 in (180 cm)
- Weight: 180 lb (82 kg; 12 st 12 lb)
- Position: Right wing
- Shot: Right
- Played for: Boston Bruins; Minnesota North Stars; California Golden Seals; New England Whalers; Washington Capitals
- National team: United States
- Playing career: 1960–1976
Medal record
Men's ice hockey
Representing the United States
Gold medal – first place	1960 Squaw Valley	Ice hockey

Thomas Mark "Tommy, The Bomber" Williams (April 17, 1940 – February 8, 1992) was an American professional ice hockey player. A good skater and shooter, he received his nickname due to an incident in the early 1970s when he joked with Toronto customs officials that his bag contained a bomb (he was suspended for one game by the NHL as punishment). During most of the 1960s, Williams was the only regular American player in the NHL.

== Amateur career ==
Born in Duluth, Minnesota, Williams was a member of the U.S. Olympic hockey team that defeated Czechoslovakia and won the gold medal at the 1960 Winter Olympics in Squaw Valley. He scored one goal and had four assists while playing on the second line with Bill Christian and Roger Christian.

== Professional career ==
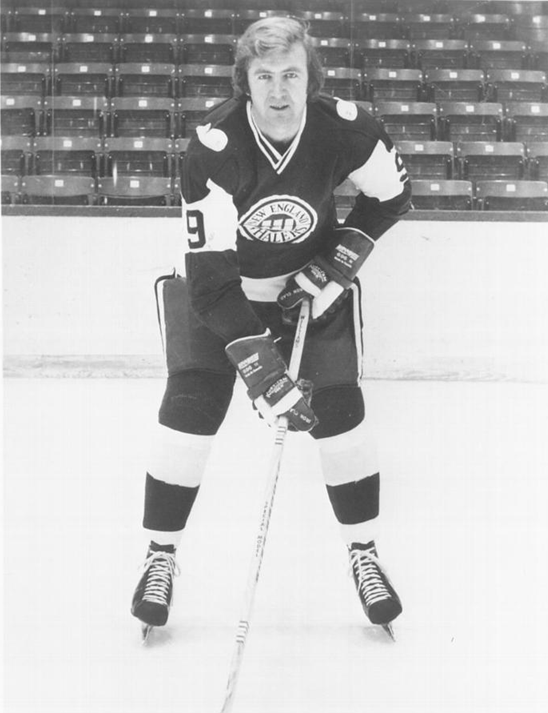
Williams in 1972-73 photo for New England Whalers

His National Hockey League career began when he joined the Boston Bruins for the 1961–62 NHL season. After eight seasons with the Bruins (and a serious injury in 1968 that almost ended his career), he joined the Minnesota North Stars, where he played for a season and a half until he was traded to the California Golden Seals. He scored a career-high 67 points in 1969-70 with Minnesota, playing on the North Stars top line with Bill Goldsworthy and Jean-Paul Parise.

After just two seasons with the Golden Seals, Williams jumped to the World Hockey Association (WHA) to play for the New England Whalers, where he was a part of the first Avco World Trophy given out as the Whalers won the trophy in the 1973 WHA playoffs; Williams had six goals and eleven assists in the playoffs. Upon his return to the NHL, he joined the new expansion team Washington Capitals, led the team in scoring (22 goals, 36 assists), and was awarded the franchise's first penalty shot on December 5, 1974, against the Buffalo Sabres. He retired during the 1975–76 NHL season.

He and his younger brother Butch Williams were the first American brothers to play in the NHL.

== Post-career ==
In 1981, Williams was inducted into the United States Hockey Hall of Fame.

He made an appearance on the American game show I've Got a Secret, in which his secret was (at the time, in early 1966) that he was the only American-born player in major professional hockey.

== Personal life ==
Williams' life was marred by personal tragedies that also harmed his playing career. In November 1970 his wife was found dead in a car; it was never determined for certain whether her death was due to accident or suicide. Normally a happy-go-lucky free spirit, he became moody and fought with North Stars manager Jack Gordon, who suspended him before trading him to the Seals. After he had retired from hockey, remarried, and found a new career, his 23-year-old son Bobby Williams (a Boston Bruins prospect) died in 1987. Williams himself died of a heart attack in Hudson, Massachusetts on February 8, 1992, at the age of 51.

== Career statistics ==
=== Regular season and playoffs ===
			Regular season					Playoffs
Season	Team	League	GP	G	A	Pts	PIM	GP	G	A	Pts	PIM
1957–58	Central High School	HS-MN	—	—	—	—	—	—	—	—	—	—
1958–59	United States National Team	Intl	50	21	12	33	22	—	—	—	—	—
1959–60	United States National Team	Intl	—	21	17	38	0	—	—	—	—	—
1960–61	Kingston Frontenacs	EPHL	51	16	26	42	18	5	0	2	2	0
1961–62	Boston Bruins	NHL	26	6	6	12	2	—	—	—	—	—
1961–62	Kingston Frontenacs	EPHL	36	10	18	28	35	—	—	—	—	—
1962–63	Boston Bruins	NHL	69	23	20	43	11	—	—	—	—	—
1963–64	Boston Bruins	NHL	37	8	15	23	8	—	—	—	—	—
1964–65	Boston Bruins	NHL	65	13	21	34	28	—	—	—	—	—
1965–66	Boston Bruins	NHL	70	16	22	38	31	—	—	—	—	—
1966–67	Boston Bruins	NHL	29	8	13	21	2	—	—	—	—	—
1967–68	Boston Bruins	NHL	68	18	32	50	14	4	1	0	1	2
1968–69	Boston Bruins	NHL	26	4	7	11	19	—	—	—	—	—
1969–70	Minnesota North Stars	NHL	75	15	52	67	18	6	1	5	6	0
1970–71	Minnesota North Stars	NHL	41	10	13	23	16	—	—	—	—	—
1970–71	California Golden Seals	NHL	18	7	10	17	8	—	—	—	—	—
1971–72	California Golden Seals	NHL	33	3	9	12	2	—	—	—	—	—
1971–72	Boston Braves	AHL	31	8	15	23	8	9	2	6	8	6
1972–73	New England Whalers	WHA	69	10	21	31	14	15	6	11	17	2
1973–74	New England Whalers	WHA	70	21	37	58	6	4	0	3	3	10
1974–75	Washington Capitals	NHL	73	22	36	58	12	—	—	—	—	—
1975–76	Washington Capitals	NHL	34	8	13	21	6	—	—	—	—	—
1975–76	New Haven Nighthawks	AHL	20	4	16	20	4	3	0	1	1	0
WHA totals			139	31	58	89	20	19	6	14	20	12
NHL totals			663	161	269	430	177	10	2	5	7	2

=== International ===
Year	Team	Event	GP	G	A	Pts	PIM
1959	United States	WC	8	7	2	9	—
1960	United States	OLY	7	4	6	10	2
Totals			15	11	8	19	—
