= Ron Buchanan =

Canadian ice hockey player (born 1944)

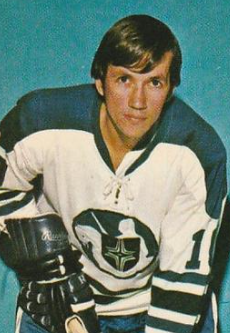
- Buchanan in 1972–73
- Born: November 15, 1944 (age 81) Montreal, Quebec, Canada
- Height: 6 ft 3 in (191 cm)
- Weight: 170 lb (77 kg; 12 st 2 lb)
- Position: Centre
- Shot: Left
- Played for: Boston Bruins; St. Louis Blues; Cleveland Crusaders; Edmonton Oilers; Indianapolis Racers
- Playing career: 1965–1976

Ronald Leonard "Bucky" Buchanan (born November 15, 1944, in Montreal, Quebec) is a Canadian former professional ice hockey centre who played extensively in the World Hockey Association and briefly in the National Hockey League between 1966 and 1976.

== Biography ==
Buchanan was a member of the Oshawa Generals for three seasons, playing on teams that included Bobby Orr and Wayne Cashman. Buchanan went on to play for the Boston Bruins and St. Louis Blues of the NHL and the Cleveland Crusaders, Edmonton Oilers and Indianapolis Racers of the WHA.

Buchanan played the majority of his career with teams in the minor professional leagues (AHL, CPHL/CHL, WHL).

After he retired from playing, Buchanan was briefly the head coach of the Los Angeles Blades of the minor-pro Pacific Hockey League.

Buchanan's father, Ralph Buchanan, was also a professional hockey player and had played two games for the New York Rangers in the 1948–49 NHL season.

== Career statistics ==
=== Regular season and playoffs ===
| | | | Regular season | | | | | Playoffs |
| Season | Team | League | GP | G | A | Pts | PIM | GP | G | A | Pts | PIM |
|---|---|---|---|---|---|---|---|---|---|---|---|---|
| 1962–63 | Oshawa Generals | MJAHL | 39 | 13 | 25 | 38 | 18 | — | — | — | — | — |
| 1963–64 | Oshawa Generals | OHA | 56 | 52 | 47 | 99 | 38 | 4 | 4 | 3 | 7 | 12 |
| 1964–65 | Oshawa Generals | OHA | 49 | 50 | 53 | 103 | 21 | 6 | 5 | 3 | 8 | 0 |
| 1964–65 | Minneapolis Bruins | CHL | — | — | — | — | — | 4 | 0 | 0 | 0 | 0 |
| 1965–66 | Oklahoma City Blazers | CHL | 70 | 27 | 16 | 43 | 33 | 9 | 5 | 5 | 10 | 0 |
| 1966–67 | Boston Bruins | NHL | 3 | 0 | 0 | 0 | 0 | — | — | — | — | — |
| 1966–67 | Oklahoma City Blazers | CHL | 56 | 34 | 35 | 69 | 23 | 11 | 5 | 5 | 10 | 6 |
| 1967–68 | Oklahoma City Blazers | CHL | 64 | 26 | 48 | 74 | 41 | — | — | — | — | — |
| 1968–69 | Quebec Aces | AHL | 11 | 3 | 1 | 4 | 2 | — | — | — | — | — |
| 1968–69 | Kansas City Blues | CHL | 50 | 16 | 45 | 61 | 16 | — | — | — | — | — |
| 1969–70 | St. Louis Blues | NHL | 2 | 0 | 0 | 0 | 0 | — | — | — | — | — |
| 1969–70 | Kansas City Blues | CHL | 66 | 26 | 48 | 74 | 79 | — | — | — | — | — |
| 1969–70 | Buffalo Bisons | AHL | — | — | — | — | — | 1 | 0 | 0 | 0 | 0 |
| 1970–71 | Kansas City Blues | CHL | 63 | 23 | 33 | 56 | 31 | — | — | — | — | — |
| 1971–72 | Denver Spurs | WHL | 69 | 38 | 42 | 80 | 10 | 9 | 5 | 6 | 11 | 8 |
| 1972–73 | Cleveland Crusaders | WHA | 75 | 37 | 44 | 81 | 20 | 9 | 7 | 3 | 10 | 0 |
| 1973–74 | Cleveland Crusaders | WHA | 49 | 18 | 27 | 45 | 2 | 5 | 0 | 0 | 0 | 2 |
| 1974–75 | Cleveland Crusaders | WHA | 4 | 2 | 0 | 2 | 2 | — | — | — | — | — |
| 1974–75 | Edmonton Oilers | WHA | 22 | 6 | 9 | 15 | 4 | — | — | — | — | — |
| 1974–75 | Indianapolis Racers | WHA | 32 | 16 | 15 | 31 | 16 | — | — | — | — | — |
| 1975–76 | Indianapolis Racers | WHA | 23 | 4 | 7 | 11 | 4 | — | — | — | — | — |
| WHA totals | | | 205 | 83 | 102 | 185 | 48 | 14 | 7 | 3 | 10 | 2 |
| NHL totals | | | 5 | 0 | 0 | 0 | 0 | — | — | — | — | — |
