= Rich Pumple =

Canadian ice hockey player

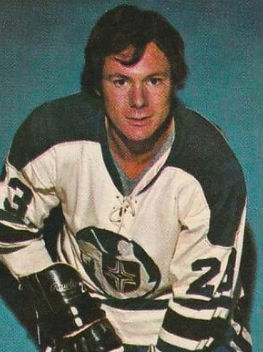
- Pumple in 1972–73
- Born: February 11, 1948 (age 78) Lachine, Quebec, Canada
- Height: 6 ft 2 in (188 cm)
- Weight: 205 lb (93 kg; 14 st 9 lb)
- Position: Centre
- Shot: Left
- Played for: Cleveland Crusaders; Indianapolis Racers
- Playing career: 1971–1977

Rich Pumple (born February 11, 1948, in Lachine, Quebec) is a Canadian retired professional ice hockey forward. He played 128 games in the World Hockey Association with the Indianapolis Racers and Cleveland Crusaders.

== Career statistics ==
=== Regular season and playoffs ===
			Regular season					Playoffs
Season	Team	League	GP	G	A	Pts	PIM	GP	G	A	Pts	PIM
1964–65	Lachine Maroons	MMJHL	41	17	31	48	49
1965–66	Montreal Junior Canadiens	OHA	44	6	8	14	44	—	—	—	—	—
1966–67	Montreal Junior Canadiens	OHA	27	2	5	7	9	—	—	—	—	—
1968–69	Providence College	ECAC	21	14	17	31	32	—	—	—	—	—
1969–70	Providence College	ECAC	5	4	11	15	8	—	—	—	—	—
1970–71	Providence College	ECAC	28	22	41	63	46	—	—	—	—	—
1971–72	Muskegon Mohawks	IHL	71	25	19	44	62	10	4	3	7	36
1972–73	Cleveland Crusaders	WHA	77	21	20	41	45	9	3	5	8	11
1973–74	Jacksonville Barons	AHL	55	16	16	32	26	—	—	—	—	—
1973–74	Cleveland Crusaders	WHA	17	2	2	4	16	—	—	—	—	—
1974–75	Indianapolis Racers	WHA	34	4	8	12	29	—	—	—	—	—
1974–75	Mohawk Valley Comets	NAHL	3	0	1	1	4	—	—	—	—	—
1974–75	Roanoke Valley Rebels	SHL	18	8	10	18	11	4	0	2	2	2
1975–76	Mohawk Valley Comets	NAHL	25	17	10	27	52	4	1	0	1	4
1976–77	Mohawk Valley Comets	NAHL	44	22	22	44	26	5	1	4	5	9
WHA totals			128	27	30	57	90	9	3	5	8	11
