= Mike Byers =

Canadian ice hockey player

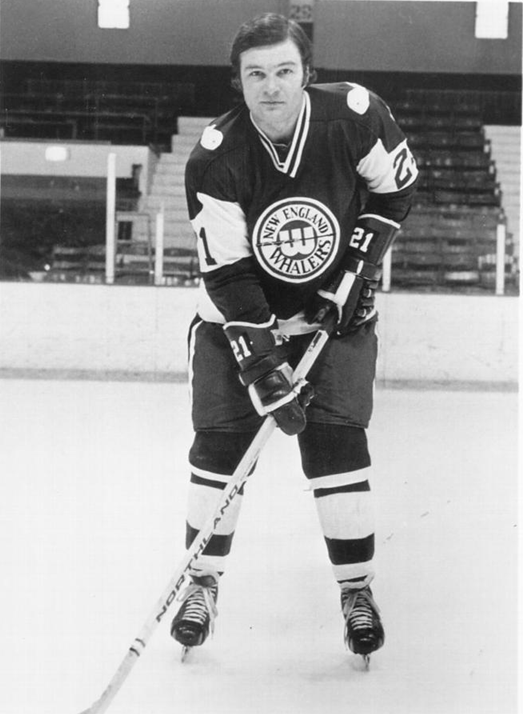
- Born: September 11, 1946 Toronto, Ontario, Canada
- Died: September 16, 2010 (aged 64) California, USA
- Height: 5 ft 11 in (180 cm)
- Weight: 185 lb (84 kg; 13 st 3 lb)
- Position: Right Wing
- Shot: Right
- Played for: Toronto Maple Leafs; Philadelphia Flyers; Los Angeles Kings; Buffalo Sabres; Los Angeles Sharks; New England Whalers; Cincinnati Stingers
- Playing career: 1967–1977

Michael Arthur Byers (September 11, 1946 — September 16, 2010) was a Canadian ice hockey right wing. He played in the National Hockey League for the Toronto Maple Leafs, Philadelphia Flyers, Los Angeles Kings, and Buffalo Sabres between 1967 and 1972. He also played in the World Hockey Association for the Los Angeles Sharks, New England Whalers, and Cincinnati Stingers between 1972 and 1976.

In his NHL career, Byers played in 166 games, scoring 42 goals and 34 assists. He played in 263 WHA games, scoring 83 goals and adding 74 assists.

== Career statistics ==
=== Regular season and playoffs ===
			Regular season					Playoffs
Season	Team	League	GP	G	A	Pts	PIM	GP	G	A	Pts	PIM
1962–63	Toronto Marlboros	MTJAHL	2	4	1	5	0	9	3	5	8	6
1963–64	Toronto Marlboros	OHA	2	0	0	0	0	—	—	—	—	—
1964–65	Toronto Marlboros	OHA	56	22	18	40	37	19	1	4	5	8
1965–66	Toronto Marlboros	OHA	47	21	21	42	45	14	4	2	6	4
1966–67	Toronto Marlboros	OHA	41	25	19	44	20	17	3	3	6	15
1966–67	Toronto Marlboros	M-Cup	—	—	—	—	—	9	3	3	6	14
1967–68	Toronto Maple Leafs	AHL	10	2	2	4	0	—	—	—	—	—
1967–68	Rochester Americans	AHL	31	7	8	15	0	—	—	—	—	—
1967–68	Tulsa Oilers	CHL	27	14	5	19	32	11	1	3	4	2
1968–69	Toronto Maple Leafs	NHL	5	0	0	0	2	—	—	—	—	—
1968–69	Tulsa Oilers	CHL	51	17	17	34	6	—	—	—	—	—
1968–69	Philadelphia Flyers	NHL	5	0	2	2	0	4	0	1	1	0
1969–70	Quebec Aces	AHL	62	15	23	38	11	6	1	0	1	0
1970–71	Los Angeles Kings	NHL	72	27	18	45	14	—	—	—	—	—
1971–72	Los Angeles Kings	NHL	28	4	5	9	11	—	—	—	—	—
1971–72	Buffalo Sabres	NHL	46	9	7	16	12	—	—	—	—	—
1972–73	Los Angeles Sharks	WHA	56	19	17	36	20	—	—	—	—	—
1972–73	New England Whalers	WHA	19	6	4	10	4	12	6	5	11	6
1973–74	New England Whalers	WHA	78	29	21	50	6	7	2	4	6	12
1974–75	New England Whalers	WHA	72	22	26	48	10	6	2	2	4	2
1975–76	New England Whalers	WHA	21	4	3	7	0	—	—	—	—	—
1975–76	Cincinnati Stingers	WHA	20	3	3	6	0	—	—	—	—	—
1976–77	Rochester Americans	AHL	66	25	29	54	10	8	2	4	6	0
WHA totals			266	83	74	157	40	25	10	11	21	20
NHL totals			166	42	34	76	39	4	0	1	1	0
