= Kevin Ahearn =

American ice hockey player (born 1948)

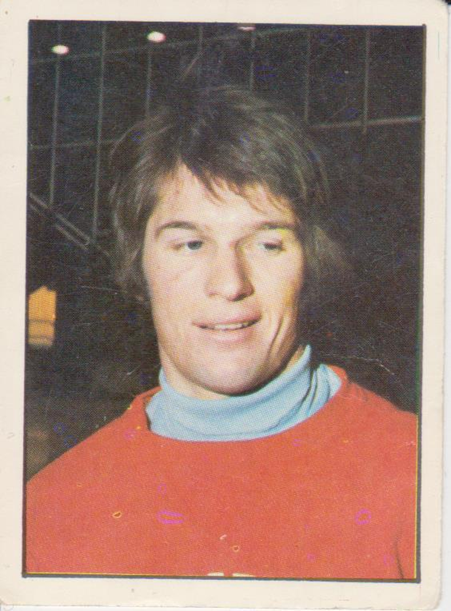
- Born: June 20, 1948 (age 78) Milton, Massachusetts, U.S.
- Height: 5 ft 9 in (175 cm)
- Weight: 161 lb (73 kg; 11 st 7 lb)
- Position: Left wing
- Shot: Left
- Played for: New England Whalers
- National team: United States
- Playing career: 1970–1975
Medal record
Men's ice hockey
Representing United States
Olympic Games
Silver medal – second place	1972 Sapporo	Team

Kevin Joseph Ahearn (born June 20, 1948) is a retired professional ice hockey player who played 78 games in the World Hockey Association with the New England Whalers in 1972–73. As an amateur, he played for the Boston College men's ice hockey as well as the US national team at the 1972 Winter Olympics and 1971 Ice Hockey World Championship tournament.

== Career statistics ==
=== Regular season and playoffs ===
			Regular Season					Playoffs
Season	Team	League	GP	G	A	Pts	PIM	GP	G	A	Pts	PIM
1966–67	Boston College	NCAA	DNP - Freshman
1967–68	Boston College	ECAC Hockey	30	14	23	37	14	—	—	—	—	—
1968–69	Boston College	ECAC Hockey	26	12	21	33	10	—	—	—	—	—
1969–70	Boston College	ECAC Hockey	26	19	36	55	4	—	—	—	—	—
1970–71	Montréal Voyageurs	AHL	4	0	2	2	4	—	—	—	—	—
1971–72	Nova Scotia Voyageurs	AHL	7	1	1	2	0	—	—	—	—	—
1972–73	New England Whalers	WHA	78	20	22	42	18	14	1	2	3	9
1973–74	Jacksonville Barons	AHL	58	22	24	46	27	—	—	—	—	—
1974–75	Long Island Cougars	NAHL	39	16	25	41	11	11	7	3	10	11
NCAA totals			82	45	80	125	28	—	—	—	—	—
WHA totals			78	20	22	42	18	14	1	2	3	9
AHL totals			69	23	27	50	31	—	—	—	—	—

=== International ===
Year	Team	Event	GP	G	A	Pts	PIM
1970–71	United States	International	50	20	18	38	31
1971	United States	WC	10	1	1	2	2
1971–72	United States	International	50	32	26	58	61
1972	United States	OG	6	6	3	9	0
International totals			100	52	44	96	92
