= Brad Selwood =

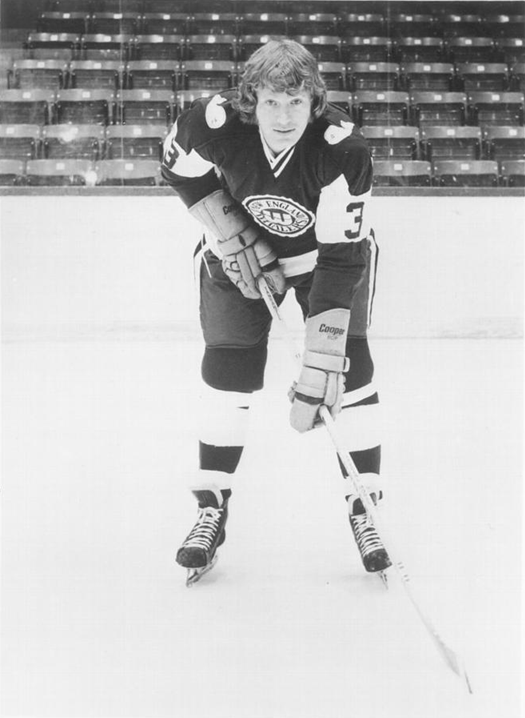
- Born: March 18, 1948 (age 78) Leamington, Ontario, Canada
- Height: 6 ft 3 in (191 cm)
- Weight: 186 lb (84 kg; 13 st 4 lb)
- Position: Defence
- Shot: Left
- Played for: Toronto Maple Leafs; New England Whalers; Los Angeles Kings
- National team: Canada
- NHL draft: 10th overall, 1968; Toronto Maple Leafs
- Playing career: 1968–1982

Bradley Wayne Selwood (born March 18, 1948) is a Canadian former professional ice hockey player and the former General Manager and head coach of the Oshawa Generals of the Ontario Hockey League. He played in the National Hockey League with the Toronto Maple Leafs and Los Angeles Kings between 1970 and 1980, and in the World Hockey Association with the New England Whalers between 1972 and 1979.

== Playing career ==
Selwood played junior ice hockey for the 1968 Memorial Cup champion Niagara Falls Flyers before a professional career. He played two seasons with the Toronto Maple Leafs, but shortly after was lured by the New England Whalers of the fledgling World Hockey Association. Selwood played 431 games in the WHA with the Whalers, the third highest total in the team's history.

Selwood also played in the 1974 Summit Series for Canada against the Soviet Union. When the WHA merged with the NHL, he was claimed by the Montreal Canadiens, who still held his rights and who shortly thereafter traded him to the Los Angeles Kings. He played one season for the Kings and a few more seasons in the minors before retiring.

== Post-playing career ==
He has served as a coach and executive for much of his retirement, notably with the Generals, Thornhill Islanders, London Knights, and Newmarket Hurricanes.

Selwood later served as President of the Markham Islanders of the GTHL.

== Career statistics ==
=== Regular season and playoffs ===
			Regular season					Playoffs
Season	Team	League	GP	G	A	Pts	PIM	GP	G	A	Pts	PIM
1967–68	Niagara Falls Flyers	OHA	54	10	23	33	75	19	6	11	17	35
1967–68	Thornhill Rattlers	OHA-B	—	—	—	—	—	—	—	—	—	—
1967–68	Niagara Falls Flyers	M-Cup	—	—	—	—	—	10	1	3	4	16
1968–69	Tulsa Oilers	CHL	70	7	32	39	118	—	—	—	—	—
1969–70	Vancouver Canucks	WHL	72	9	24	33	93	11	1	9	10	26
1970–71	Toronto Maple Leafs	NHL	28	2	10	12	13	—	—	—	—	—
1970–71	Tulsa Oilers	CHL	13	1	1	2	4	—	—	—	—	—
1971–72	Toronto Maple Leafs	NHL	72	4	17	21	58	5	0	0	0	4
1972–73	New England Whalers	WHA	75	13	21	34	114	15	3	5	8	22
1973–74	New England Whalers	WHA	76	9	28	37	91	7	0	2	2	1
1974–75	New England Whalers	WHA	77	4	35	39	117	5	1	0	1	11
1975–76	New England Whalers	WHA	40	2	10	12	28	17	2	2	4	27
1976–77	New England Whalers	WHA	41	4	12	16	71	5	0	0	0	2
1977–78	New England Whalers	WHA	80	6	25	31	88	14	0	3	3	8
1978–79	New England Whalers	WHA	42	4	12	16	47	—	—	—	—	—
1979–80	Los Angeles Kings	NHL	63	1	13	14	82	1	0	0	0	0
1980–81	Houston Apollos	CHL	30	0	9	9	37	—	—	—	—	—
1980–81	Fort Worth Texans	CHL	33	2	14	16	53	5	0	0	0	4
1981–82	New Haven Nighthawks	AHL	23	2	4	6	30	—	—	—	—	—
WHA totals			431	42	143	185	556	63	6	12	18	81
NHL totals			163	7	40	47	153	6	0	0	0	4

=== International ===
Year	Team	Event	GP	G	A	Pts	PIM
1974	Canada	SS	4	0	0	0	2
Senior totals			4	0	0	0	2

Preceded by John Wright	Toronto Maple Leafs first-round draft pick 1968	Succeeded by Ernie Moser
