= Al Smith (ice hockey) =

Canadian ice hockey player (1945–2002)

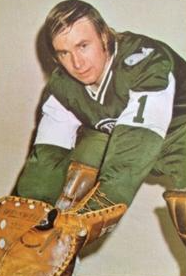
- Born: November 10, 1945 Toronto, Ontario, Canada
- Died: August 7, 2002 (aged 56)
- Height: 6 ft 1 in (185 cm)
- Weight: 200 lb (91 kg; 14 st 4 lb)
- Position: Goaltender
- Caught: Left
- Played for: Toronto Maple Leafs; Pittsburgh Penguins; Detroit Red Wings; New England Whalers; Buffalo Sabres; Colorado Rockies; Hartford Whalers
- Playing career: 1964–1981

Allan Robert Smith (November 10, 1945 – August 7, 2002) was a Canadian professional ice hockey goaltender. Smith played in junior league hockey before becoming a goalie with the Toronto Maple Leafs in the National Hockey League in the 1965-66 season. He played in ten professional games in three seasons while spending most of his time with minor leagues such as the Central Professional Hockey League. He moved over to the Pittsburgh Penguins, where he played as the main goalie from 1969 to 1971 before spending a season with the Detroit Red Wings. In 1972, Smith vaulted to the upstart World Hockey Association with the New England Whalers. In his first season, he went 31–19–1 before leading the team to the Avco World Trophy, winning 12 of his 15 postseason games under the net. He played with the Whalers for two further seasons before moving onto the Buffalo Sabres in 1975, where he played sparingly until his sudden retirement in 1977. He returned to the Whalers later that year and won the Ben Hatskin Trophy for his goaltending that season, going 30–20–3 with a GAA of 3.22. He played goalie for another two seasons there before being sold to the Colorado Rockies in 1980, where he closed his career out with nine wins in 36 games. In 491 combined professional games as a goaltender, Smith went 214–197–51.

== Minor-pro career ==
Smith began junior hockey in 1961 with the Toronto Marlboros. In 1962 he began playing for the Lakeshore Bruins of the OHA before rejoining the Marlboros in the 1964–65 season.

Late in the 1965–66 NHL season, Smith played two games with the Toronto Maple Leafs, winning one of them and posting a 1.94 goals against average. In 1966 he was sent to the Maple Leaf farm team in Victoria, British Columbia (also called the Maple Leafs) where he started 56 games. He was moved to the Western Hockey League's Vancouver Canucks for the 1967 playoffs, where he played in 6 games, posting a 2.61 GAA and one shutout. That year he also appeared in one game for the San Francisco Seals in the WHL playoffs.

From 1967 to 1969 he played 85 games with the Tulsa Oilers, Rochester Americans, and Baltimore Clippers minor league teams before joining the Pittsburgh Penguins, being claimed from the Toronto organization in the NHL Intra-League Draft on June 11, 1969.

== Professional career ==
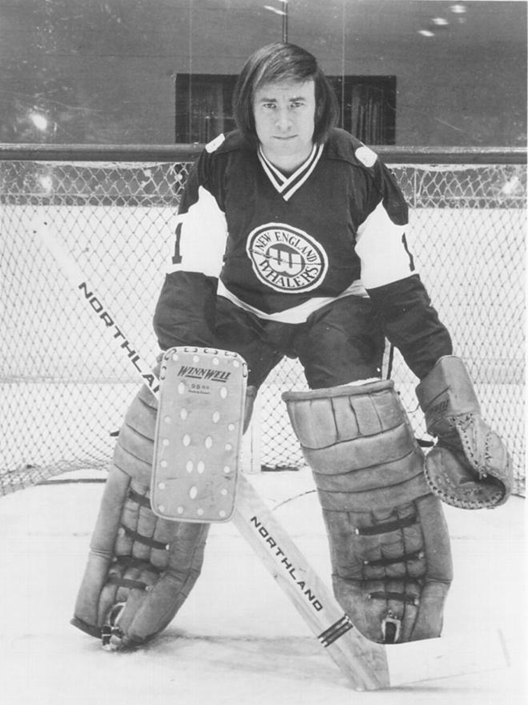
1972 photo of Smith with the New England Whalers.

Smith started his NHL career with the Toronto Maple Leafs. During the 1965-66 season, Smith had quit the Toronto Marlboros to work for a hospital supply firm. Smith made his NHL debut for the Maple Leafs on February 20, 1966, playing two minutes. Three days later, on the 23rd, he entered the game against the Chicago Black Hawks when he relieved Gary Smith after 2:15 of play. He backstopped the Leafs to a 3–2 victory and stalled Bobby Hull at 47 goals; it was the last game Smith played that year. Smith was one of five goalies who played for the Maple Leafs during the 1966–67 regular season. He played one more game for the Maple Leafs on December 31, 1966, as part of a 5–1 losing effort against the Black Hawks. Smith was later called up as the backup to Terry Sawchuk for games four and five of 1967 Stanley Cup Final, due to an injury to Johnny Bower. Smith qualified to have his name engraved on the Stanley Cup, but Toronto left his name off because he did not play in the playoffs.

Smith's other brief moment of glory for the Maple Leafs was participating in the 1968 NHL All-Star Game. He played in relief for Bruce Gamble and stopped 13 of 14 shots. He was claimed by the Pittsburgh Penguins in the intraleague draft.

Smith also played for the Pittsburgh Penguins, Detroit Red Wings, Buffalo Sabres, Hartford Whalers and Colorado Rockies. One of the most infamous moments of his career came on February 13, 1977, when he quit the Buffalo Sabres. Smith was to replace injured goalie Gerry Desjardins for a game against the Minnesota North Stars, and Buffalo had also called up Don Edwards. Less than an hour before game time, Buffalo general manager Punch Imlach ordered Sabres coach Floyd Smith to play Edwards instead. After the national anthem, Smith stepped off the bench, saluted Buffalo owners Seymour and Northrup Knox and headed for the dressing room.

Smith later played in the World Hockey Association (WHA) with the New England Whalers where he was the WHA's top goaltender in 1978. A third team WHA All-Star for two consecutive years, many people in hockey felt Smith was robbed when snubbed by Team Canada for the 1974 Summit Series between WHA All-Stars and the Soviet Union national team. Overall, his career spanned from 1966 to 1981.

=== Transaction history ===
Smith was claimed from Toronto by Pittsburgh in the National Hockey League intraleague draft, June 11, 1969, then from Pittsburgh by the Detroit Red Wings in the intraleague draft, June 8, 1971. He was subsequently selected by the New England Whalers in the 1972 World Hockey Association General Player Draft, on February 12, 1972.

Smith was traded by the Red Wings to Buffalo for future considerations, on March 10, 1975, then signed as a free agent by New England on August 15, 1977. His National Hockey League rights were retained by Whalers before the expansion draft, on June 9, 1979. Finally, he was traded by Whalers to the Colorado Rockies for cash, on September 4, 1980.

== Post-career ==
In 1981, Smith played 37 games for the Colorado Rockies and retired. He became a car salesman in Vancouver, and later headed to the British Columbia interior to pick fruit. Before returning to Toronto, Smith also was a salesman for Reuters.

Smith kept in touch with former WHA teammate Larry Pleau. When Pleau coached the Hartford Whalers in the NHL, he would leave Smith tickets at Maple Leaf Gardens.

Once he returned to Toronto, Smith engaged in his love of writing. Subjects would include sports, such as in his 1997 novel The Parade has Passed, featuring a WHA forward who hitchhikes to the funeral of his former coach, who had died in a brawl. Smith later wrote the play Confessions to Anne Sexton and the beginnings of a novel entitled, The Tragedy of Lake Tuscarora. To make ends meet, Smith became a taxi driver for Beck Taxi. It was not uncommon for Smith to pick up old friends and former teammates.

In 1998, Smith used the $34,000 of pension benefits he'd received as part of the NHL's settlement with former players to produce Confessions to Anne Sexton at the Alumnae Theatre on Berkeley Street in downtown Toronto. The play was about a former goalie who goes to New York City to attend an Impressionist art exhibit. On opening night, seventeen people attended the performance, the biggest house of the show's three-week run.

In the last few months of his life, Smith socialized with Jim Keon, the brother of Smith's former teammate Dave Keon. Before his death, Smith was still working on The Tragedy of Lake Tuscarora. Smith's son Adam said that his father was not a talented writer, and after reading the manuscript told his father on his deathbed that fourteen pages were perfect and Smith was happy.

He died in 2002 as a result of pancreatic cancer.

== Career statistics ==
=== Regular season and playoffs ===
			Regular season									Playoffs
Season	Team	League	GP	W	L	T	MIN	GA	SO	GAA	SV%	GP	W	L	MIN	GA	SO	GAA	SV%
1961–62	Toronto Marlboros	OHA	1	—	—	—	60	4	0	4.00	—	—	—	—	—	—	—	—	—
1962–63	Lakeshore Bruins	MetJHL	—	—	—	—	—	—	—	—	—	—	—	—	—	—	—	—	—
1963–64	Lakeshore Bruins	MetJHL	—	—	—	—	—	—	—	—	—	—	—	—	—	—	—	—	—
1964–65	Lakeshore Bruins	MetJHL	—	—	—	—	—	—	—	—	—	—	—	—	—	—	—	—	—
1964–65	Toronto Marlboros	OHA	3	—	—	—	180	20	0	6.67	—	—	—	—	—	—	—	—	—
1965–66	Toronto Marlboros	OHA	22	—	—	—	1320	92	—	4.15	—	14	—	—	840	37	0	2.61	—
1965–66	Toronto Maple Leafs	NHL	2	1	0	0	62	2	0	1.92	.935	—	—	—	—	—	—	—	—
1966–67	Toronto Maple Leafs	NHL	1	0	1	0	60	5	0	5.00	.857	—	—	—	—	—	—	—	—
1966–67	Victoria Maple Leafs	WHL	56	24	26	5	3375	180	6	3.20	—	—	—	—	—	—	—	—	—
1966–67	Vancouver Canucks	WHL	—	—	—	—	—	—	—	—	—	6	1	4	345	15	1	2.61	—
1966–67	California Seals	WHL	—	—	—	—	—	—	—	—	—	1	0	1	60	4	0	4.00	—
1967–68	Tulsa Oilers	CPHL	40	23	12	5	2278	126	0	3.32	.893	4	2	2	240	11	0	2.75	—
1968–69	Toronto Maple Leafs	NHL	7	1	2	1	331	16	0	2.90	.908	—	—	—	—	—	—	—	—
1968–69	Tulsa Oilers	CPHL	8	—	—	—	480	22	0	2.87	—	—	—	—	—	—	—	—	—
1968–69	Rochester Americans	AHL	34	13	12	7	1979	114	2	3.46	—	—	—	—	—	—	—	—	—
1969–70	Pittsburgh Penguins	NHL	46	15	20	8	2554	129	2	3.03	.899	3	1	2	179	10	0	3.35	.888
1970–71	Pittsburgh Penguins	NHL	45	9	22	9	2471	128	2	3.11	.898	—	—	—	—	—	—	—	—
1971–72	Detroit Red Wings	NHL	43	18	20	4	2495	134	4	3.22	.892	—	—	—	—	—	—	—	—
1972–73	New England Whalers	WHA	51	31	19	1	3059	162	3	3.18	.894	15	12	3	909	49	0	3.23	.886
1973–74	New England Whalers	WHA	55	30	21	2	3194	164	2	3.08	.895	7	3	4	399	21	1	3.16	.913
1974–75	New England Whalers	WHA	59	33	21	4	3494	202	2	3.47	.883	6	2	4	366	28	0	4.59	.854
1975–76	Buffalo Sabres	NHL	14	9	3	2	839	43	0	3.07	.881	1	0	0	17	1	0	3.49	.500
1976–77	Buffalo Sabres	NHL	7	0	3	0	264	19	0	4.33	.836	—	—	—	—	—	—	—	—
1977–78	New England Whalers	WHA	55	30	20	3	3246	174	2	3.22	.885	3	0	2	120	14	0	7.00	—
1978–79	New England Whalers	WHA	40	17	17	5	2396	132	1	3.31	.883	4	1	2	153	12	0	4.71
1979–80	Hartford Whalers	NHL	30	11	10	8	1748	107	2	3.67	.876	2	0	2	120	10	0	4.99	.844
1979–80	Springfield Indians	AHL	2	1	1	0	120	6	0	3.00	.923	—	—	—	—	—	—	—	—
1980–81	Colorado Rockies	NHL	36	9	18	4	1902	151	0	4.76	.835	—	—	—	—	—	—	—	—
WHA totals			260	141	98	15	15,389	834	10	3.25	.888	35	18	15	1947	124	1	3.82	—
NHL totals			231	73	99	36	12,726	734	10	3.46	.883	6	1	4	317	21	0	3.97	.866

== Awards and honours ==
Accolades:

- Played in National Hockey League All-Star Game, 1968
- Played in World Hockey Association All-Star Game, 1972–73
- Named to World Hockey Association All-Star Third Team, 1972–73
- Played in World Hockey Association All-Star Game, 1973–74
- Named to World Hockey Association All-Star Third Team, 1973–74
- Played in World Hockey Association All-Star Game, 1974–75
- Won the Ben Hatskin Trophy (Top WHA Goaltender), 1977–78
- Named to World Hockey Association All-Star First Team, 1977–78
- Inaugural member of the World Hockey Association Hall of Fame, 2010
