= Rick Ley =

Canadian ice hockey player and coach (born 1948)

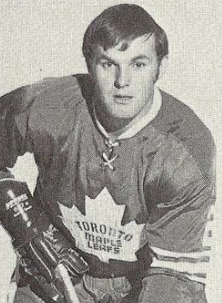
- Born: November 2, 1948 (age 77) Orillia, Ontario, Canada
- Height: 5 ft 9 in (175 cm)
- Weight: 190 lb (86 kg; 13 st 8 lb)
- Position: Defence
- Shot: Left
- Played for: Toronto Maple Leafs; New England/Hartford Whalers
- National team: Canada
- NHL draft: 16th overall, 1966; Toronto Maple Leafs
- Playing career: 1968–1981

Richard Norman Ley (born November 2, 1948) is a Canadian former professional ice hockey player who played in the National Hockey League (NHL) and World Hockey Association (WHA).

== Playing career ==
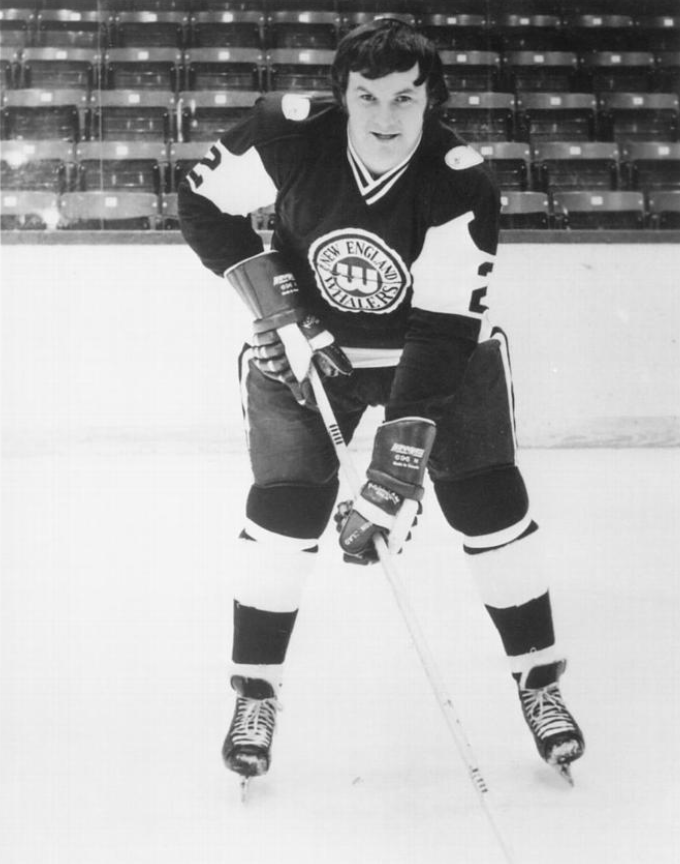
Ley with the New England Whalers in the 1972-73 season. Ley was one of three Whalers to have their number retired with the team.

Ley was drafted by the Toronto Maple Leafs in the third round (16th overall) in the 1966 NHL Amateur Draft. He played four seasons with the Maple Leafs (1968–69 to 1971–72) in the NHL before leaving to play with the New England Whalers of the WHA, which offered more money (he stated he was paid $18,000 in his last year with Toronto while making $78,000 in his first season with New England). He later stated his appreciation of the league, noting, “The league was knocked around by people, but remember the NHL, five-to-seven years after the merger, saw that half of the top ten scorers in the NHL were former WHA players. We helped make the first real changes in wages for pro hockey players and the players today, who were not even born then, have no idea how much the economics of the game today can trace their roots right back to the WHA.” He would remain with the Whalers' organization in the WHA until that league folded in 1979. The Whalers, along with three other teams from the WHA's remaining six, were absorbed into the NHL in 1979. Ley made the transition with the New England Whalers (who would become the Hartford Whalers) and finished his professional playing career in 1981.

Ley spent six years as the Whalers' captain and was one of three players in Hartford Whalers' history to have his jersey number retired (#2), joining Gordie Howe and John McKenzie. Following the Whalers move to Raleigh, the Hurricanes ceased to honor Ley's #2 and McKenzie's #19, and returned the numbers to circulation, although #2 was re-retired by the Hurricanes, this time in honor of Glen Wesley.

Ley and his wife Ellen have a daughter, Kathleen.

== Honours ==
In 2010, he was elected as an inaugural inductee into the World Hockey Association Hall of Fame.

== Coaching career ==
Ley began his coaching career in International Hockey League, where he coached the Muskegon Lumberjacks to four first-place finishes and one championship during his tenure between 1984 and 1988. He was then hired by former Leafs defence partner Pat Quinn to coach the Vancouver Canucks IHL affiliate in Milwaukee. In the IHL, he went 259-123-38.

Ley was named coach of the Hartford Whalers on June 7, 1989. With a coaching style described as the same as he played in being aggressive and hard-nosed, Ley led them to consecutive 4th-place finishes and first round playoff defeats at the hands of their New England rival the Boston Bruins in both seasons. Ley had considerable disputes with team owner Richard Gordon, who he described him as such: "Richard Gordon was a pleasant man to talk to. He had a Ph.D., but he thought he knew everything. He knew nothing about running a hockey team. He was a terrible owner." It was Gordon that pushed to remove Ron Francis as captain of the team, as Gordon told them that Francis, alongside three other players had expiring contracts that were to be traded before the end of the season. These disagreements led to an untenable relationship that compelled general manager Eddie Johnston to fire Ley in May of 1991.

Ley then rejoined the Canucks. After serving as an assistant coach under Quinn for three seasons from 1991–92 to 1993–94, Ley became the 12th head coach in Vancouver Canucks' history on August 10, 1994 when Quinn elected to focus on his front office duties. In 121 regular season games as head coach, the Canucks posted a record of 47–48–26 before he was fired with six games remaining in the 1995-96 season. He also served the Canucks in a professional scouting capacity in 1996–97 and 1997–98.

In 1998, he was once again hired by Quinn as an assistant coach with the Toronto Maple Leafs and held that role for eight seasons until he was relieved of his duties at the conclusion of the 2005–06 season.

== Career statistics ==
=== Regular season and playoffs ===
			Regular season					Playoffs
Season	Team	League	GP	G	A	Pts	PIM	GP	G	A	Pts	PIM
1964–65	Niagara Falls Flyers	OHA-Jr.	50	0	11	11	58	11	0	3	3	28
1964–65	Niagara Falls Flyers	M-Cup	—	—	—	—	—	8	0	2	2	8
1965–66	Niagara Falls Flyers	OHA-Jr.	46	3	13	16	180	6	0	6	6	18
1966–67	Niagara Falls Flyers	OHA-Jr.	48	10	27	37	128	12	2	4	6	24
1967–68	Niagara Falls Flyers	OHA-Jr.	53	16	48	64	81	19	1	15	16	38
1967–68	Niagara Falls Flyers	M-Cup	—	—	—	—	—	10	1	6	7	15
1968–69	Toronto Maple Leafs	NHL	38	1	11	12	39	3	0	0	0	9
1968–69	Tulsa Oilers	CHL	19	0	5	5	23	—	—	—	—	—
1969–70	Toronto Maple Leafs	NHL	48	2	13	15	102	—	—	—	—	—
1970–71	Toronto Maple Leafs	NHL	76	4	16	20	151	6	0	2	2	4
1971–72	Toronto Maple Leafs	NHL	67	1	14	15	124	5	0	0	0	7
1972–73	New England Whalers	WHA	76	3	27	30	108	15	3	7	10	24
1973–74	New England Whalers	WHA	72	6	35	41	148	7	1	5	6	18
1974–75	New England Whalers	WHA	72	6	36	42	50	6	1	1	2	32
1975–76	New England Whalers	WHA	67	8	30	38	78	17	1	4	5	49
1976–77	New England Whalers	WHA	55	2	21	23	102	5	0	4	4	4
1977–78	New England Whalers	WHA	73	3	41	44	95	14	1	8	9	4
1978–79	New England Whalers	WHA	73	7	20	27	135	9	0	4	4	11
1979–80	Hartford Whalers	NHL	65	4	16	20	92	—	—	—	—	—
1980–81	Hartford Whalers	NHL	16	0	2	2	20	—	—	—	—	—
NHL totals			310	12	72	84	528	14	0	2	2	20
WHA totals			478	35	210	245	716	73	7	33	40	142

=== International ===
Year	Team	Event	GP	G	A	Pts	PIM
1974	Canada	SS	7	0	0	0	16

== Coaching statistics ==
Team	Year	Regular season						Postseason
Team	Year	G	W	L	T	Pts	Finish	Result
HAR	1989–90	80	38	33	9	85	4th in Adams	Lost in first round
HAR	1990–91	80	31	38	11	73	4th in Adams	Lost in first round
VAN	1994–95	48	18	18	12	48	2nd in Pacific	Lost in second round
VAN	1995–96	76	29	32	15	(79)	3rd in Pacific	(fired)
Total		284	116	121	47			

== See also ==
- Hartford Whalers
- Carolina Hurricanes
- Vancouver Canucks
- Toronto Maple Leafs
- World Hockey Association
- defenceman (ice hockey)

Preceded by Ted Green	New England Whalers / Hartford Whalers captain 1975–80	Succeeded by Mike Rogers
Preceded by Larry Pleau	Head coach of the Hartford Whalers; 1989–91	Succeeded by Jim Roberts
Preceded by Pat Quinn	Head coach of the Vancouver Canucks; 1994–96	Succeeded by Pat Quinn
