= Tom Webster (ice hockey) =

Canadian ice hockey player (1948–2020)

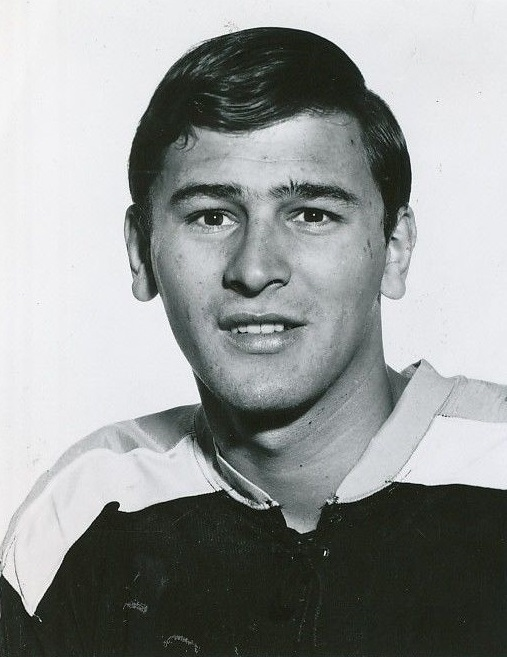
- Webster in 1969
- Born: October 4, 1948 Kirkland Lake, Ontario, Canada
- Died: April 10, 2020 (aged 71) Toronto, Ontario, Canada
- Height: 5 ft 10 in (178 cm)
- Weight: 170 lb (77 kg; 12 st 2 lb)
- Position: Right wing
- Shot: Right
- Played for: Boston Bruins; Detroit Red Wings; California Golden Seals; New England Whalers
- National team: Canada
- NHL draft: 19th overall, 1966; Boston Bruins
- Playing career: 1968–1980

Thomas Ronald Webster (October 4, 1948 – April 10, 2020) was a Canadian professional ice hockey player and coach.

== Playing career ==
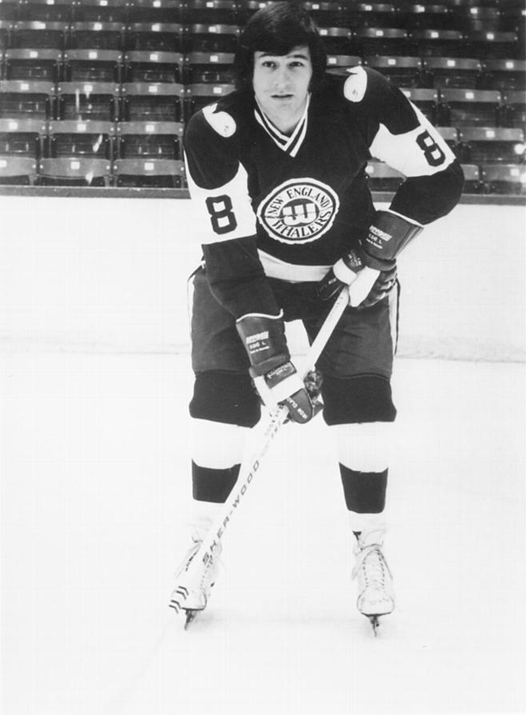
Webster of the New England Whalers in 1972-73 season card

Originally selected by the Boston Bruins in the 1966 NHL entry draft, Webster played in a total of 102 National Hockey League (NHL) games with the Bruins and Detroit Red Wings. Webster scored 30 goals for the Red Wings in the 1970-71 season, but only managed 3 goals in 12 games of the 1971-72 season. He also played 352 games for the New England Whalers of the World Hockey Association, scoring 40 or more goals three times. Spinal fusion surgery complicated the end of his career, and Webster retired in 1981 at age 31.

== Coaching career ==
After retiring as a player, Webster had been the coach for a number of teams at various levels of hockey.

His first head coaching job came in 1986, when he became coach of the New York Rangers following Ted Sator's firing. After only five games, Webster fell ill with what was later diagnosed as an inner-ear infection that left him unable to fly. He returned as head coach on January 5 for home games only; general manager Phil Esposito split coaching duties with assistants Eddie Giacomin and Wayne Cashman for road games. He was cleared to fly again in January, but he suffered a relapse during a game against the Edmonton Oilers, and was told to stay off planes for at least three months. Esposito named himself head coach for the remainder of the season. When it became apparent that Webster would not be able to return to the bench full-time the following season, he resigned on April 30, 1987.

Webster's next head coaching stint was with the Los Angeles Kings, from May 31, 1989, to May 4, 1992. He led the Kings to their first and only regular season division title in franchise history, in the 1990-91 season.

While coaching the Kings in a game against Detroit on November 16, 1991, Webster became upset at what he felt was a blown call by referee Kerry Fraser. The Kings were assessed an extra penalty, and Webster took a stick and threw it on the ice, hitting one of Fraser's skates. Webster was suspended for 12 games.

Webster also served as an amateur scout for the Calgary Flames from 2003 to 2014.

== Honours ==
In 2012, he was inducted into the World Hockey Association Hall of Fame.

== Death ==
Webster died on April 10, 2020, at the age of 71; he had been reported to have brain cancer.

== Career statistics ==
=== Regular season and playoffs ===
			Regular season					Playoffs
Season	Team	League	GP	G	A	Pts	PIM	GP	G	A	Pts	PIM
1965–66	Niagara Falls Flyers	OHA-Jr.	43	16	27	43	16	6	2	3	5	0
1966–67	Niagara Falls Flyers	OHA-Jr.	47	19	26	45	26	13	14	8	22	4
1967–68	Niagara Falls Flyers	OHA-Jr.	54	50	64	114	55	19	13	13	26	20
1967–68	Niagara Falls Flyers	MC	—	—	—	—	—	10	7	11	18	10
1968–69	Boston Bruins	NHL	9	0	2	2	9	1	0	0	0	0
1968–69	Oklahoma City Blazers	CHL	44	29	42	71	31	12	10	8	18	19
1969–70	Boston Bruins	NHL	2	0	1	1	2	—	—	—	—	—
1969–70	Oklahoma City Blazers	CHL	49	29	35	64	49	—	—	—	—	—
1970–71	Detroit Red Wings	NHL	78	30	37	67	40	—	—	—	—	—
1971–72	Detroit Red Wings	NHL	5	1	1	2	4	—	—	—	—	—
1971–72	California Golden Seals	NHL	7	2	1	3	6	—	—	—	—	—
1972–73	New England Whalers	WHA	77	53	50	103	89	15	12	14	26	6
1973–74	New England Whalers	WHA	64	43	27	70	28	3	5	0	5	7
1974–75	New England Whalers	WHA	66	40	24	64	52	3	0	2	2	0
1975–76	New England Whalers	WHA	55	33	50	83	24	17	10	9	19	6
1976–77	New England Whalers	WHA	70	36	49	85	43	5	1	1	2	0
1977–78	New England Whalers	WHA	20	15	5	20	5	—	—	—	—	—
1979–80	Detroit Red Wings	NHL	1	0	0	0	0	—	—	—	—	—
1979–80	Adirondack Red Wings	AHL	12	4	5	9	2	—	—	—	—	—
NHL totals			102	33	42	75	61	1	0	0	0	0
WHA totals			352	220	205	425	241	43	28	26	54	19

=== International ===
Year	Team	Event	GP	G	A	Pts	PIM
1974	Canada	SS	4	2	1	3	4

== Coaching record ==
Team	Year	Regular season						Postseason			
Team	Year	G	W	L	T	Pts	Finish	W	L	Win %	Result
NYR	1986-87	16	5	7	4	14	(interim)	—	—	—	—
LAK	1989-90	80	34	39	7	75	4th in Smythe	4	6	.400	Lost in Second Round (EDM)
LAK	1990-91	80	46	24	10	102	1st in Smythe	6	6	.500	Lost in Second Round (EDM)
LAK	1991-92	80	35	31	14	84	2nd in Smythe	2	4	.333	Lost in First Round (EDM)
NHL Totals		258	120	113	31			12	16	.429	3 playoff appearances

Preceded by Ted Sator	Head coach of the New York Rangers; 1986–87	Succeeded by Phil Esposito
Preceded by Robbie Ftorek	Head coach of the Los Angeles Kings; 1989–92	Succeeded by Barry Melrose
