= Christian Bordeleau =

Canadian retired ice hockey forward

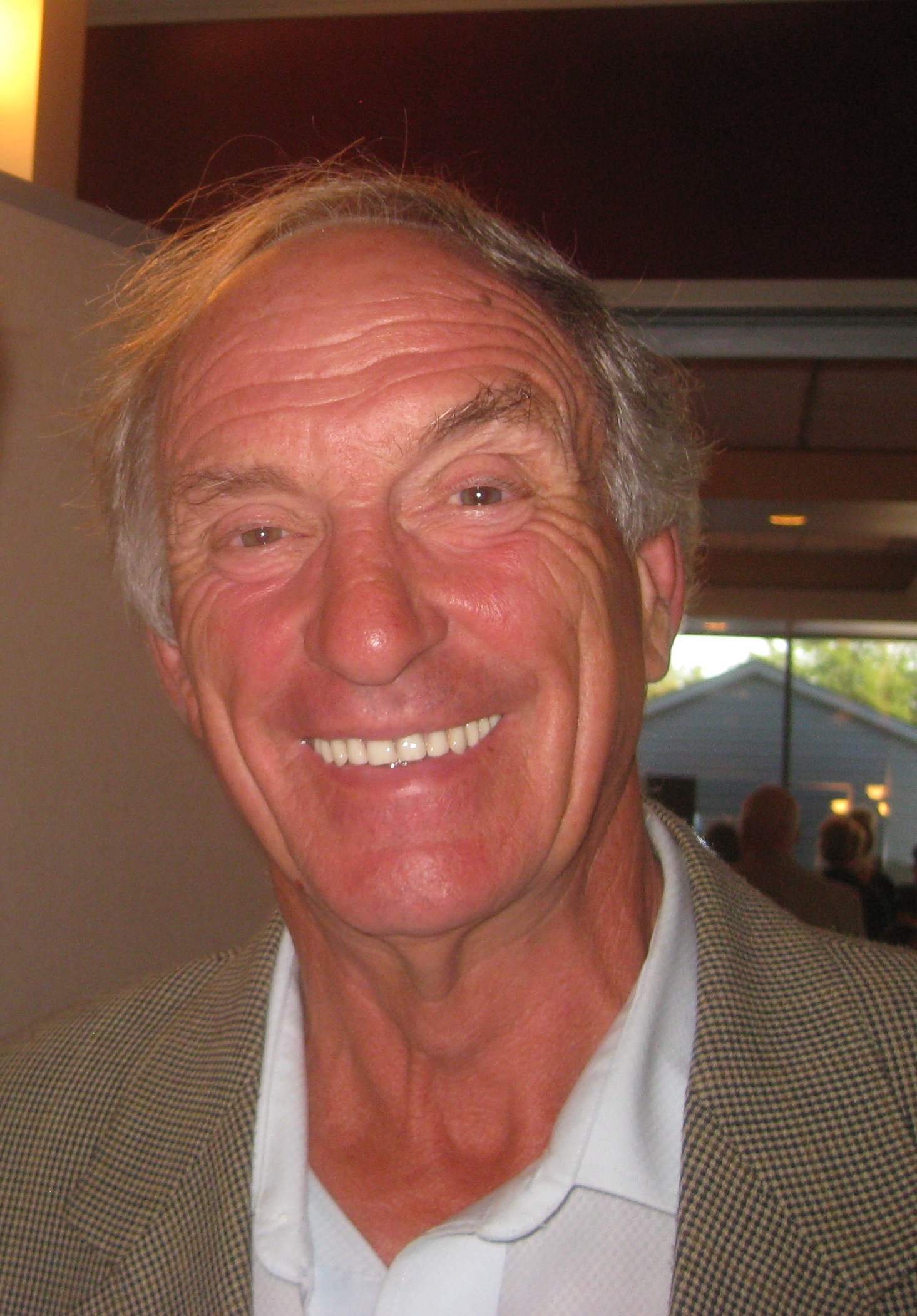
- Bordeleau in 2010
- Born: September 23, 1947 (age 78) Noranda, Quebec, Canada
- Height: 5 ft 8 in (173 cm)
- Weight: 172 lb (78 kg; 12 st 4 lb)
- Position: Centre
- Caught: Left
- Played for: Montreal Canadiens; St. Louis Blues; Chicago Black Hawks; Winnipeg Jets; Quebec Nordiques
- NHL draft: Undrafted
- Playing career: 1967–1980

Christian Gerrard "Chris" Bordeleau (born September 23, 1947) is a Canadian former professional ice hockey forward. He played in the National Hockey League between 1969 and 1972, and the World Hockey Association between 1972 and 1979.

== Playing career ==
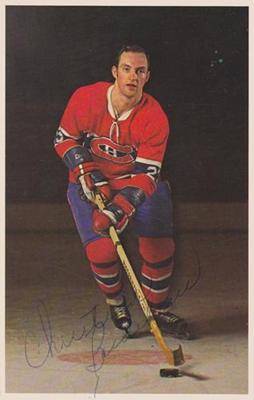
Bordeleau for Montreal Canadiens in 1969

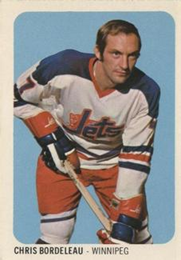
1973 card of Bordeleau for Winnipeg Jets

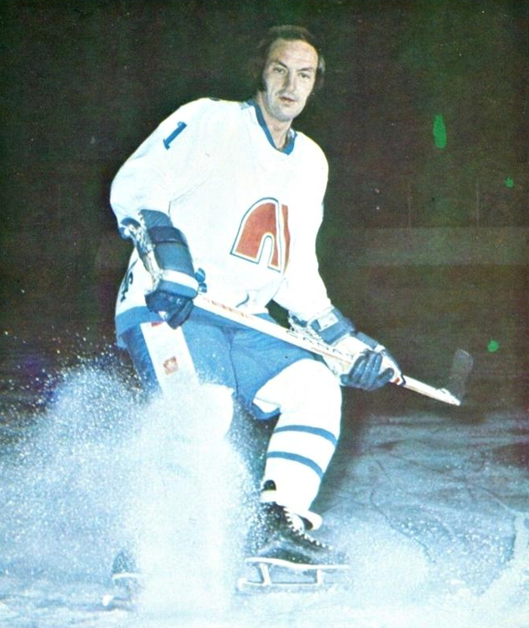
1976 photo of Bordeleau for Quebec Nordiques

Bordeleau started his National Hockey League career with the Montreal Canadiens in 1969. He also played for the Chicago Black Hawks and St. Louis Blues. He left the NHL after the 1972 season and would also play in the World Hockey Association for the Winnipeg Jets and Quebec Nordiques. He won the Stanley Cup in 1969 with the Montreal Canadiens. Christian's brothers Jean-Pierre and Paulin Bordeleau were also professional hockey players.

== Honours ==
In 1977, Christian was a member of the World Hockey Association's Avco Cup Champions the Quebec Nordiques.

In 2012, he was inducted into the World Hockey Association Hall of Fame.

== Career statistics ==
=== Regular season and playoffs ===
| | | | Regular season | | | | | Playoffs |
| Season | Team | League | GP | G | A | Pts | PIM | GP | G | A | Pts | PIM |
|---|---|---|---|---|---|---|---|---|---|---|---|---|
| 1962–63 | Noranda Copper Kings | NOJHA | 40 | 42 | 36 | 78 | — | — | — | — | — | — |
| 1963–64 | Montreal Junior Canadiens | OHA | 49 | 16 | 18 | 34 | — | — | — | — | — | — |
| 1964–65 | Montreal Junior Canadiens | OHA | 50 | 28 | 28 | 56 | — | — | — | — | — | — |
| 1965–66 | Montreal Junior Canadiens | OHA | 43 | 16 | 48 | 64 | 57 | — | — | — | — | — |
| 1966–67 | Montreal Junior Canadiens | OHA | 33 | 8 | 19 | 27 | 30 | — | — | — | — | — |
| 1967–68 | Houston Apollos | CHL | 68 | 23 | 28 | 51 | 22 | — | — | — | — | — |
| 1968–69 | Montreal Canadiens | NHL | 13 | 1 | 3 | 4 | 4 | 6 | 1 | 0 | 1 | 0 |
| 1968–69 | Houston Apollos | CHL | 54 | 21 | 36 | 57 | 33 | — | — | — | — | — |
| 1969–70 | Montreal Canadiens | NHL | 48 | 2 | 13 | 15 | 18 | — | — | — | — | — |
| 1970–71 | St. Louis Blues | NHL | 78 | 21 | 32 | 53 | 48 | 5 | 0 | 1 | 1 | 17 |
| 1971–72 | St. Louis Blues | NHL | 41 | 8 | 9 | 17 | 6 | — | — | — | — | — |
| 1971–72 | Chicago Black Hawks | NHL | 25 | 6 | 8 | 14 | 6 | 8 | 3 | 6 | 9 | 0 |
| 1972–73 | Winnipeg Jets | WHA | 78 | 47 | 54 | 101 | 12 | 12 | 5 | 8 | 13 | 4 |
| 1973–74 | Winnipeg Jets | WHA | 75 | 26 | 49 | 75 | 22 | 3 | 3 | 2 | 5 | 0 |
| 1974–75 | Winnipeg Jets | WHA | 18 | 8 | 8 | 16 | 0 | — | — | — | — | — |
| 1974–75 | Quebec Nordiques | WHA | 53 | 15 | 33 | 48 | 24 | 15 | 2 | 13 | 15 | 2 |
| 1975–76 | Quebec Nordiques | WHA | 74 | 37 | 72 | 109 | 42 | 5 | 1 | 1 | 2 | 4 |
| 1976–77 | Quebec Nordiques | WHA | 73 | 32 | 75 | 107 | 34 | 8 | 4 | 5 | 9 | 0 |
| 1977–78 | Quebec Nordiques | WHA | 26 | 9 | 22 | 31 | 28 | 10 | 1 | 5 | 6 | 6 |
| 1978–79 | Quebec Nordiques | WHA | 16 | 5 | 12 | 17 | 0 | — | — | — | — | — |
| 1979–80 | Salt Lake Golden Eagles | CHL | 11 | 3 | 6 | 9 | 4 | — | — | — | — | — |
| WHA totals | | | 413 | 179 | 325 | 504 | 162 | 53 | 16 | 34 | 50 | 16 |
| NHL totals | | | 205 | 38 | 65 | 103 | 82 | 19 | 4 | 7 | 11 | 17 |
