= 1972–73 WHA season =

Sports season

- League: World Hockey Association
- Sport: Ice hockey
- Duration: October 11, 1972 - May 6, 1973
- Games: 78
- Teams: 12

Regular season
- Season champions: New England Whalers
- Season MVP: Bobby Hull (Winnipeg)
- Top scorer: Andre Lacroix (Philadelphia)

Avco Cup Final
- Champions: New England Whalers
- Runners-up: Winnipeg Jets

WHA seasons
- 1973–74

The 1972–73 WHA season was the first season of the World Hockey Association (WHA). Twelve teams played 78 games each. The league was officially incorporated in June of 1971 by Gary Davidson and Dennis A. Murphy and promised to ice twelve teams in various markets around Canada and the United States to rival the National Hockey League (NHL). The league instituted a ten-minute sudden-death overtime period for games not decided in the first sixty minutes while still awarding a point for a tie if a goal was not scored. The NHL, which had abolished overtime since 1942, did not re-adopt overtime until 1982; ironically, the WHA only instituted sudden-death overtime after their plan of having a shootout (in the style of a penalty shot) saw an exhibition last 18 rounds that dissuaded them. The league championship trophy, the Avco World Trophy, was donated by AVCO Financial Services Corporation along with $500,000. The New England Whalers won the first Avco World Trophy.

== 1972 General Player Draft ==
The WHA's inaugural player draft was held in Anaheim, California on February 12 and 13, 1972. All 12 WHA franchises took part in the draft. There were no drafting constraints, and the WHA teams selected players from all levels of play, including established National Hockey League players, minor leaguers, college, junior players, Europeans, and even retired players. The first player selected in the general draft was United States men's national ice hockey team member Henry Boucha, taken by the Minnesota Fighting Saints (who also selected the Governor of Minnesota, Wendell Anderson, with a late pick). After 70 rounds the Winnipeg Jets selected Soviet premier Alexei Kosygin and then stopped participating in the draft, while the other teams continued making selections. This process continued, with teams arbitrarily dropping out from the draft, while others kept going, until attrition finally ended the process. The final two teams participating in this draft were the Dayton Aeros and the Los Angeles Sharks. In all, just under 1100 selections were made by the 12 teams, who could now focus their efforts on signing players for the first season of play.

== Regular season summary ==
The first WHA games, on October 11, 1972, were won by the Alberta Oilers 7–4 over the Ottawa Nationals at the Ottawa Civic Centre and the Cleveland Crusaders 2–0 over the Quebec Nordiques at Cleveland Arena. Ron Anderson of the Oilers scored the first goal in WHA history at 6:19 in the first period. In the first weekend of play, Gary Davidson claimed 100,000 fans attended WHA games.

The WHA was split into two divisions, the Eastern Division and the Western Division. Each division sported six teams. The New England Whalers led the Eastern Division and had the best record in the league. The other playoff qualifiers in the East were Cleveland, Philadelphia, and Ottawa. The Winnipeg Jets led the Western Division and had the second-best record in the league. Behind Winnipeg, the West had a thrilling race with four teams fighting for three playoff spots, trading second through fifth place all season. Houston won three of its last four games to finish second with 82 points. With two games remaining, Minnesota had 79 points, Alberta had 77, and Los Angeles had 76. Los Angeles won their last two games to finish third, while Minnesota and Alberta both lost their next to last game of the season, setting up a final game showdown in Minnesota against each other with Minnesota two points ahead of Alberta. Alberta won the game 5-3, so both teams finished with identical records. The league now faced a dilemma. The first standings tiebreaker was number of wins, and the teams both had 38. The second tiebreaker was head-to-head record and the teams split their eight games with four wins apiece. The league by-laws did not specify further tiebreakers. In the NHL, the next two tie breakers were goal differential and goals scored, both of which favored Alberta. But because the WHA by-laws did not specify additional tiebreakers, the league Board of Governors met to decide how to break the tie. They ultimately decided on a 1-game playoff at a neutral site. The league Board of Governors, meeting quickly to decide, elected to move on a one-game playoff while allowing the Oilers to have a choice of site, and due to prior booking in Edmonton, the team elected to pick Calgary to host the one-game playoff. Mel Pearson scored the first goal seventeen minutes into the game for the Fighting Saints, who ultimately won the tiebreaker game, the only one held in WHA history.

=== Final standings ===
GP = Games Played, W = Wins, L = Losses, T = Ties, Pts = Points, GF = Goals for, GA = Goals against, PIM = Penalties in minutes
Teams that qualifies for the playoffs are highlighted in bold

Eastern Division
	GP	W	L	T	GF	GA	PIM	Pts
**New England Whalers**	78	46	30	2	318	263	858	94
**Cleveland Crusaders**	78	43	32	3	287	239	1095	89
**Philadelphia Blazers**	78	38	40	0	288	305	1260	76
**Ottawa Nationals**	78	35	39	4	279	301	1067	74
Quebec Nordiques	78	33	40	5	276	313	1354	71
New York Raiders	78	33	43	2	303	334	900	68

Western Division
	GP	W	L	T	GF	GA	PIM	Pts
**Winnipeg Jets**	78	43	31	4	285	249	757	90
**Houston Aeros**	78	39	35	4	284	269	1363	82
**Los Angeles Sharks**	78	37	35	6	259	250	1477	80
**Minnesota Fighting Saints**	78	38	37	3	250	269	843	79
Alberta Oilers	78	38	37	3	269	256	1134	79
Chicago Cougars	78	26	50	2	245	295	811	54

== Player stats ==
=== Scoring leaders ===
_{Bolded numbers indicate season leaders}

GP = Games played; G = Goals; A = Assists; Pts = Points; PIM = Penalty minutes

Player	Team	GP	G	A	Pts	PIM
Andre Lacroix	Philadelphia Blazers	78	50	**74**	**124**	83
Ron Ward	New York Raiders	77	51	67	118	28
Danny Lawson	Philadelphia Blazers	78	**61**	45	106	35
Tom Webster	New England Whalers	77	53	50	103	89
Bobby Hull	Winnipeg Jets	63	51	52	103	37
Norm Beaudin	Winnipeg Jets	78	38	65	103	15
Chris Bordeleau	Winnipeg Jets	78	47	54	101	12
Terry Caffery	New England Whalers	74	39	61	100	14
Gord Labossiere	Houston Aeros	77	36	60	96	56
Wayne Carleton	Ottawa Nationals	75	42	49	91	42

=== Leading goaltenders ===
_{Bolded numbers indicate season leaders}

GP = Games played; Min = Minutes played; W = Wins; L = Losses; T = Ties, GA = Goals against; GA = Goals against; SO = Shutouts; SV% = Save percentage; GAA = Goals against average

Player	Team	GP	Min	W	L	T	GA	SO	SV%	GAA
Gerry Cheevers	Cleveland Crusaders	52	3144	32	20	2	149	**5**	**91.2**	**2.84**
Russ Gillow	Los Angeles Sharks	38	1892	17	13	2	96	2	88.7	2.91
Wayne Rutledge	Houston Aeros	36	2163	20	14	2	110	0	90.7	3.05
Jack Norris	Alberta Oilers	**64**	**3702**	28	**37**	3	189	1	90.2	3.06

== All-star game ==
The WHA held its first all-star game on January 6, 1973, in Quebec City. The attendance of 5,435 was lower than expected, perhaps because it was locally televised and Quebec City was hit by a major snow storm. The East defeated the West 6–2. Wayne Carleton of the Ottawa Nationals was named the game MVP.

During the all-star break, the WHA Players' Association was officially formed, with Curt Leichner of Portland as general counsel and Bill Hicke of the Alberta Oilers as president.

== Playoff summary ==
Compared to the thrilling race in the West Division, the playoffs were unexciting in that the team with the better record won every series and only one series went beyond 5 games. That was the West semifinal between Houston and Los Angeles. After getting blown out in game one in Houston by a score of 7–2, Los Angeles rallied to win game two 4–2 and even the series. The Sharks then won a thrilling game three in L.A. 3–2. Game 4 was the turning point of the series. The teams headed into overtime tied at 2; a Houston goal would even the series while a Los Angeles goal would give the Sharks a commanding 3–1 series lead. The Aeros scored in overtime to even the series, then won game 5 in Houston, 63. Game six in L.A. was another thriller, with Houston scoring in the final minutes to win the game 3–2 and win the series.

== Avco World Trophy playoffs ==
Quarterfinals
E1	New England	4
E4	Ottawa	1
Eastern Division
E2	Cleveland	4
E3	Philadelphia	0
W1	Winnipeg	4
W4	Minnesota	1
Western Division
W2	Houston	4
W3	Los Angeles	2

Semifinals
E1	New England	4
E2	Cleveland	1
W1	Winnipeg	4
W2	Houston	0

Finals
E1	New England	4
W1	Winnipeg	1

=== Avco World Trophy finals ===
The New England Whalers defeated the Winnipeg Jets, 4 games to 1. The Whalers defeated the Jets 9–6 in the deciding game in Boston on May 6, 1973, with Larry Pleau scoring a hat trick. Upon their win, The Avco World Trophy had not yet been completed. As a result, the Whalers skated their victory lap with their divisional trophy on display instead.

== WHA awards ==
=== Trophies ===
Avco World Trophy:	New England Whalers
Gary L. Davidson Award:	Bobby Hull, Winnipeg Jets
Bill Hunter Trophy:	Andre Lacroix, Philadelphia Blazers
Lou Kaplan Trophy:	Terry Caffery, New England Whalers
Ben Hatskin Trophy:	Gerry Cheevers, Cleveland Crusaders
Dennis A. Murphy Trophy:	J. C. Tremblay, Quebec Nordiques
Paul Deneau Trophy:	Ted Hampson, Minnesota Fighting Saints
Howard Baldwin Trophy:	Jack Kelley, New England Whalers

=== All-Star Team ===
Position	First Team	Second Team	Third Team
Centre	Andre Lacroix, Philadelphia	Ron Ward, New York	Chris Bordeleau, Winnipeg
Right Wing	Danny Lawson, Philadelphia	Tom Webster, New England	Norm Beaudin, Winnipeg
Left Wing	Bobby Hull, Winnipeg	Gary Jarrett, Cleveland	Wayne Carleton, Ottawa
Defence	J. C. Tremblay, Quebec	Jim Dorey, New England	Ted Green, New England
Defence	Paul Shmyr, Cleveland	Larry Hornung, Winnipeg	Rick Ley, New England
Goaltender	Gerry Cheevers, Cleveland	Bernie Parent, Philadelphia	Al Smith, New England

== Debuts ==
The following is a list of players of note who played their first major professional game in 1972–73 (listed with their first team, asterisk(*) marks debut in playoffs):

- Mike Antonovich, Minnesota Fighting Saints
- Richard Brodeur, Quebec Nordiques
- Gavin Kirk, Ottawa Nationals
- Bruce Landon, New England Whalers
- Bob MacMillan, Minnesota Fighting Saints
- Rusty Patenaude, Alberta Oilers
- Gene Peacosh, New York Raiders
- Ron Plumb, Philadelphia Blazers
- Tim Sheehy, New England Whalers

== Last game ==
The following is a list of players of note who played their final major professional game in 1972–73:

- Kent Douglas, New York Raiders
- Bill Hicke, Alberta Oilers
- Marcel Paille, Philadelphia Blazers

== See also ==
- 1972–73 WHA All-Star Game
- 1972–73 NHL season
- 1972 in sports
- 1973 in sports
