= WHA All-Star Team =

The World Hockey Association All-Star teams were first named at the end of the 1972–73 WHA season to honor the best performers over the season at each position.

The career leader in selections was Bobby Hull, who was named to a total of 5 All-Star teams (3 first, 2 second), all with the Winnipeg Jets. Five other players made the First Team three times: Andre Lacroix, Paul Shmyr, J. C. Tremblay, Anders Hedberg and Marc Tardif.

== Selections ==
*	Denotes players inducted into the Hockey Hall of Fame
Player (X)	Denotes the number of times a player has been selected
**Player** **(in bold text)**	Denotes players who won the Gary L. Davidson Award / Gordie Howe Trophy as the WHA's Most Valuable Player in the same year

Season	Position	First Team		Second Team		Third Team	
Season	Position	Player	Team	Player	Team	Player	Team
1972–73	C	Andre Lacroix (1)	Philadelphia Blazers	Ron Ward	New York Raiders	Chris Bordeleau	Winnipeg Jets
1972–73	LW	**Bobby Hull** (1)	Winnipeg Jets	Gary Jarrett	Cleveland Crusaders	Wayne Carleton	Ottawa Nationals
1972–73	RW	Danny Lawson	Philadelphia Blazers	Tom Webster	New England Whalers	Norm Beaudin	Winnipeg Jets
1972–73	D	Paul Shmyr (1)	Cleveland Crusaders	Jim Dorey	New England Whalers	Rick Ley	New England Whalers
1972–73	D	J. C. Tremblay (1)	Quebec Nordiques	Larry Hornung	Winnipeg Jets	Ted Green	New England Whalers
1972–73	G	Gerry Cheevers (1)	Cleveland Crusaders	Bernie Parent	Philadelphia Blazers	Al Smith	New England Whalers
1973–74	C	Andre Lacroix (2)	New York Golden Blades; Jersey Knights	Wayne Carleton	Toronto Toros		
1973–74	LW	Bobby Hull (2)	Winnipeg Jets	Mark Howe (1)	Houston Aeros		
1973–74	RW	**Gordie Howe** (1)	Houston Aeros	Mike Walton	Minnesota Fighting Saints		
1973–74	D	Paul Shmyr (2)	Cleveland Crusaders	Al Hamilton (1)	Edmonton Oilers		
1973–74	D	Pat Stapleton (1)	Chicago Cougars	J. C. Tremblay (2)	Quebec Nordiques		
1973–74	G	Don McLeod	Houston Aeros	Gerry Cheevers (2)	Cleveland Crusaders		
1974–75	C	Andre Lacroix (3)	San Diego Mariners	Serge Bernier	Quebec Nordiques		
1974–75	LW	**Bobby Hull** (3)	Winnipeg Jets	Marc Tardif (1)	Quebec Nordiques		
1974–75	RW	Gordie Howe (2)	Houston Aeros	Anders Hedberg (1)	Winnipeg Jets		
1974–75	D	Kevin Morrison (1)	San Diego Mariners	Barry Long (1)	Edmonton Oilers		
1974–75	D	J. C. Tremblay (3)	Quebec Nordiques	Poul Popiel (1)	Houston Aeros		
1974–75	G	Ron Grahame (1)	Houston Aeros	Gerry Cheevers (3)	Cleveland Crusaders		
1975–76	C	Ulf Nilsson (1)	Winnipeg Jets	Robbie Ftorek (1)	Phoenix Roadrunners		
1975–76	LW	**Marc Tardif** (2)	Quebec Nordiques	Bobby Hull (4)	Winnipeg Jets		
1975–76	RW	Anders Hedberg (2)	Winnipeg Jets	Real Cloutier (1)	Quebec Nordiques		
1975–76	D	Paul Shmyr (3)	Cleveland Crusaders	Kevin Morrison (2)	San Diego Mariners		
1975–76	D	J. C. Tremblay (4)	Quebec Nordiques	Pat Stapleton (2)	Indianapolis Racers		
1975–76	G	Joe Daley (1)	Winnipeg Jets	Ron Grahame (2)	Houston Aeros		
1976–77	C	**Robbie Ftorek** (2)	Phoenix Roadrunners	Ulf Nilsson (2)	Winnipeg Jets		
1976–77	LW	Marc Tardif (3)	Quebec Nordiques	Rick Dudley	Cincinnati Stingers		
1976–77	RW	Anders Hedberg (3)	Winnipeg Jets	Real Cloutier (2)	Quebec Nordiques		
1976–77	D	Darryl Maggs	Indianapolis Racers	Mark Howe (2)	Houston Aeros		
1976–77	D	Ron Plumb	Cincinnati Stingers	Poul Popiel (2)	Houston Aeros		
1976–77	G	John Garrett	Birmingham Bulls	Joe Daley (2)	Winnipeg Jets		
1977–78	C	Ulf Nilsson (3)	Winnipeg Jets	Robbie Ftorek (3)	Cincinnati Stingers		
1977–78	LW	**Marc Tardif** (4)	Quebec Nordiques	Bobby Hull (5)	Winnipeg Jets		
1977–78	RW	Anders Hedberg (4)	Winnipeg Jets	Real Cloutier (3)	Quebec Nordiques		
1977–78	D	Al Hamilton (2)	Edmonton Oilers	Rick Ley (1)	New England Whalers		
1977–78	D	Lars-Erik Sjoberg	Winnipeg Jets	Barry Long (2)	Winnipeg Jets		
1977–78	G	Al Smith	New England Whalers	Ernie Wakely	Houston Aeros		
1978–79	C	Robbie Ftorek (4)	Cincinnati Stingers	Wayne Gretzky	Indianapolis / Edmonton Oilers		
1978–79	LW	Mark Howe (3)	New England Whalers	Morris Lukowich	Winnipeg Jets		
1978–79	RW	Real Cloutier (4)	Quebec Nordiques	Blair MacDonald	Edmonton Oilers		
1978–79	D	Rick Ley (2)	New England Whalers	Dave Langevin	Edmonton Oilers		
1978–79	D	Rob Ramage	Birmingham Bulls	Paul Shmyr (4)	Edmonton Oilers		
1978–79	G	**Dave Dryden**	Edmonton Oilers	Richard Brodeur	Quebec Nordiques		
