= 1979 WHA All-Star Games =

Professional ice hockey exhibition game

Edmonton Coliseum, Alberta
- January 2–5, 1979
- Game one: WHA All-Stars 4 – Moscow Dynamo 2
- Game two: WHA All-Stars 4 – Moscow Dynamo 2
- Game three: WHA All-Stars 4 – Moscow Dynamo 3
- MVP: None
- Attendance: 8,038 (Game 1); 11,220 (Game 2); 15,590 (Game 3)

The 1979 World Hockey Association All-Star Games were a three-game series that was held at Edmonton Coliseum in Edmonton, Alberta, the home of the Edmonton Oilers. In place of the usual one game played by the WHA with league all-stars, they elected to pit a set of their league All-Stars against Moscow Dynamo of the Soviet Union. The games were held from January 2–5, 1979. The WHA All-Stars consisted of players from the six surviving teams. Moscow did not elect to play their perceived best stars. Likely, the highlight of the series was the line of Wayne Gretzky with Gordie Howe and his son Mark Howe playing together, which scored three goals in Game 1.

Larry Hillman, coach of the defending Avco Cup champion Winnipeg Jets, coached the WHA, while Vladimir Kiselyov coached Moscow.

== Team Lineups ==
=== WHA All-Stars ===
- Coach: Larry Hillman (Winnipeg Jets)

Nat.	Player	Pos.	Team
Goaltenders
(Canada)	Dave Dryden		Edmonton Oilers
(Finland)	Markus Mattsson		Winnipeg Jets
Defencemen
(Canada)	John Hughes		Edmonton Oilers
(Canada)	Paul Shmyr		Edmonton Oilers
(Canada)	Claire Alexander		Edmonton Oilers
(Canada)	Rob Ramage		Birmingham Bulls
(Canada)	Rick Ley		New England Whalers
(Canada)	Barry Long		Winnipeg Jets
Forwards
(United States)	Robbie Ftorek		Cincinnati Stingers
(Canada)	Mike Gartner		Cincinnati Stingers
(Canada)	Peter Marsh		Cincinnati Stingers
(Canada)	Rick Dudley		Cincinnati Stingers
(Canada)	Wayne Gretzky		Edmonton Oilers
(Canada)	Blair MacDonald		Edmonton Oilers
(Canada)	Serge Bernier		Quebec Nordiques
(Canada)	Real Cloutier		Quebec Nordiques
(Canada)	Marc Tardif		Quebec Nordiques
(Canada)	Morris Lukowich		Winnipeg Jets
(Canada)	Peter Sullivan		Winnipeg Jets
(Canada)	Dave Keon		New England Whalers
(Canada)	Gordie Howe		New England Whalers
(United States)	Mark Howe		New England Whalers

=== Moscow Dynamo ===
Coach: Vladimir Kiselyov, Pavel Zhiburtovich (assistant).

Player
Goaltenders
Sergei Babariko
Vladimir Polupanov
Defencemen
Vasili Payusov
Vitali Filippov
Alexander Filippov
Sergei Gimayev
Alexei Volchenkov
Vladimir Orlov
Mikhail Slipchenko
Forwards
Viktor Shkurdyuk
Vladimir Vikulov
Alexander Lobanov
Alexander Volchkov
Pavel Yezovskikh
Vladimir Popov
Alexei Frolikov
Mikhail Shostak
Vladimir Golubovich
Vladimir Semyonov
Yevgeni Kotlov
Vladimir Devyatov
Sergei Tukmachyov
Vyacheslav Anisin

== Game summary ==
=== Game 1 ===
#	Score	Team	Goalscorer (Assist(s))	Time
First period
1	1-0	WHA	Wayne Gretzky (Mark Howe, Paul Shmyr)	1:35
2	1-1	Moscow	Alexei Frolikov (Sergei Tukmachyov, Vitali Fillippov)	14:20
3	2-1	Moscow	Vladimir Semyonov (Veygeni Kotlov)	18:08
Second period
4	2-2	WHA	Wayne Gretzky (Gordie Howe, Mark Howe)	16:29
Penalties : Backstrom (WHA All-Stars) 14:58, Long (Moscow) 18:03
Third period
5	3-2	WHA	Mark Howe (Gretzky, G. Howe)	7:02
6	4-2	WHA	Peter Sullivan	19:51

Goaltenders :

- Moscow: Sergei Babariko
- WHA: Dave Dryden

Shots on goal :

- Moscow (21) 8 - 6 - 7
- WHA: (30) 12 - 8 - 10

=== Game 2 ===
#	Score	Team	Goalscorer (Assist(s))	Time
First period
1	1-0	WHA	Morris Lukowich (Ftorek, Mike Gartner)	2:26
2	1-1	Moscow	Mikhail Shostak (Filippov, Shkurdyuk)	7:38
3	2-1	WHA	Mark Howe (Goride Howe, Wayne Gretzky)	9:27
4	3-1	WHA	Mike Gartner (Lukowich, Sullivan)	16:51
Second period
5	3-2	Moscow	Shkurdyuk (Lobanov)	19:44
Third period
6	4-2	WHA	Gretzky (Ley)	5:45

Goaltenders :

- Moscow: Sergei Babariko
- WHA: Markus Mattsson

Shots on goal :

- Moscow (22) 4 - 10 - 8
- WHA: (37) 17 - 8 - 12

=== Game 3 ===
#	Score	Team	Goalscorer (Assist(s))	Time
First period
1	1-0	WHA	Morris Lukowich (Gartner)	1:46
2	2-0	WHA	Ramage (MacDonald, Keon)	6:41
3	2-1	Moscow	Shkurdyuk (Anisin, Volchenkov)	11:02
4	2-2	Moscow	Mikhail Shostak (Slipchenko, Frolikov)	11:43
5	3-2	WHA	Peter Sullivan	18:29
Second period
6	4-2	WHA	Bernier (Ley, Gartner)	14:03.
Third period
7	4-3	Moscow	Semyonov (Payusov, Lobanov)	13:12

Goaltenders :

- Moscow: Sergei Babariko
- WHA: Markus Mattsson

Shots on goal :

- Moscow (19) 8 - 2 - 9
- WHA: (29) 13 - 11 - 5
