= Robbie Ftorek =

American ice hockey player and coach

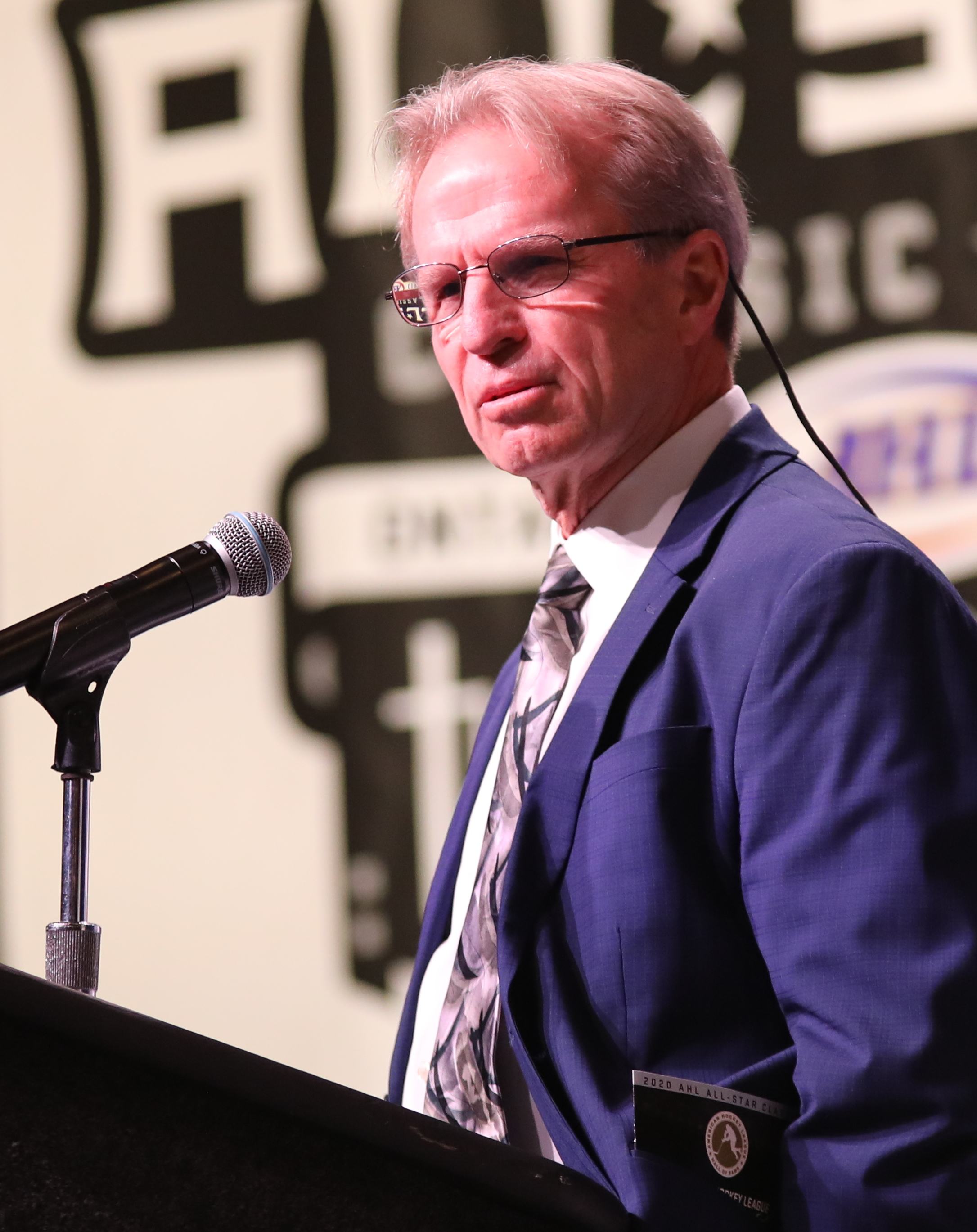
- Ftorek in 2020
- Born: January 2, 1952 (age 74) Needham, Massachusetts, U.S.
- Height: 5 ft 10 in (178 cm)
- Weight: 155 lb (70 kg; 11 st 1 lb)
- Position: Forward
- Shot: Left
- Played for: Detroit Red Wings; Phoenix Roadrunners; Cincinnati Stingers; Quebec Nordiques; New York Rangers
- National team: United States
- NHL draft: Undrafted
- Playing career: 1972–1986
Medal record
Men's ice hockey
Representing United States
Olympic Games
Silver medal – second place	1972 Sapporo	Team

Robert Brian Ftorek (/fəˈtɔːrɛk/ fə-TOR-ek; born January 2, 1952) is an American professional ice hockey coach and former player. He played over 300 games in both the National Hockey League and World Hockey Association. In the 1976–77 season, he scored 46 goals and recorded 71 assists for the Phoenix Roadrunners on his way to winning the Gordie Howe Trophy as the WHA's most valuable player. He was the first American to ever be named the most valuable player of a professional hockey league and the only one for nearly 40 years. In over 700 games as a professional hockey player, Ftorek scored 750 points. After his playing career ended, he became a head coach, where he coached in the minor leagues and the NHL for decades; he won the Calder Cup with Albany in 1995.

Ftorek was inducted in the United States Hockey Hall of Fame in 1991.

== Playing career ==
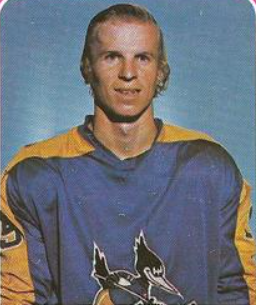
Ftorek with the Phoenix Roadrunners in 1975.

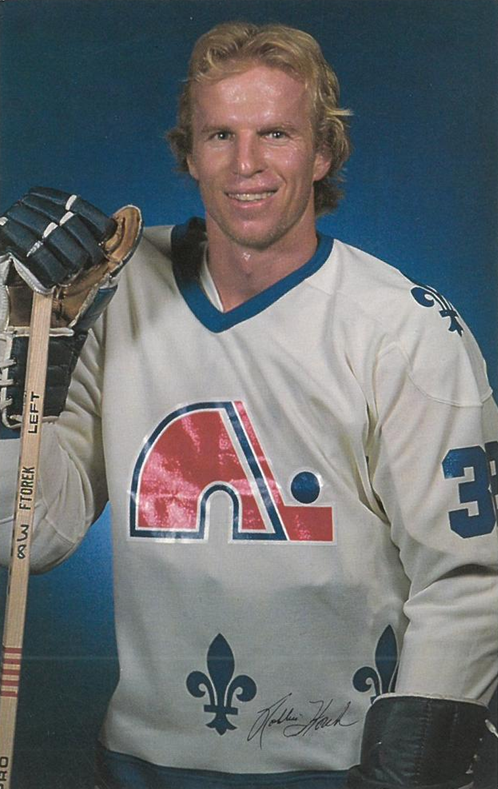
1980 postcard of Ftorek for Quebec Nordiques

In 1962, 1963 and 1964, Ftorek played in the Quebec International Pee-Wee Hockey Tournaments with his Boston youth team. He played on the United States Olympic Hockey team that won the silver medal at the 1972 Winter Olympics. He also played for Team USA at the 1972 "Pool B" Ice Hockey World Championship and was selected to the tournament all-star team.

In 1972, Ftorek was drafted by the New England Whalers of the World Hockey Association (WHA), but he signed instead with the Detroit Red Wings of the National Hockey League (NHL). The Red Wings regarded him as too small to make it as a professional at 5 foot 9 inches and 155 pounds. He appeared in only 15 games with the team over two seasons, spending most of that time in the minors with the Virginia Wings of the American Hockey League (AHL). In 1974, Ftorek decided to move over to the WHA began playing for the Phoenix Roadrunners, to whom the Whalers had traded their rights to him. He collected 100 points in the 1975–76 season, becoming the first American to do so.

Ftorek quickly became the Roadrunners' biggest star. In the 1976–77 season, on a team that finished in last place, he won the Gordie Howe Trophy as the league's most valuable player and he became the first American professional ice hockey player to be named a league MVP. He was the first player from a professional sports franchise playing in the state of Arizona to win a league MVP and the only one for nearly two decades. Ftorek confirmed his status as the most accomplished American player of the 1970s in the inaugural 1976 Canada Cup, where he was Team USA's leading scorer and the team's most valuable player. After three seasons the Roadrunners folded, and Ftorek signed with the Cincinnati Stingers.

In 1979, after the WHA folded, Ftorek signed with the Quebec Nordiques of the NHL on a seven-year contract. He became the first English-speaking captain in Nordiques history in 1981. He played for Team USA at the 1981 Canada Cup tournament but suffered a knee injury during the tournament. He played 19 games of the 1981–82 season and had one goal with eight assists before being traded on December 30, 1981 to the New York Rangers for Jere Gillis and Pat Hickey. He finished his NHL career with them in 1985. Ftorek was a member of the Tulsa Oilers CHL team that went into receivership and played only road games for the final six weeks of the 1983–84 season, but went on to win the league's championship.

Ftorek completed his NHL career with 77 goals, 150 assists, 227 points, and 262 penalty minutes in 334 games. In the WHA, Ftorek tallied 216 goals, 307 assists, 523 points, and 365 penalty minutes in 373 games, making him sixth on the WHA's all-time points list, and ninth in both the WHA's all-time career goal and assist leaders. He played in the WHA All-Star game in 1976, 1977, 1978, and 1979. He made the All-WHA First Team in 1977 and 1979, and the All-WHA Second Team in 1976 and 1978.

== Coaching career ==
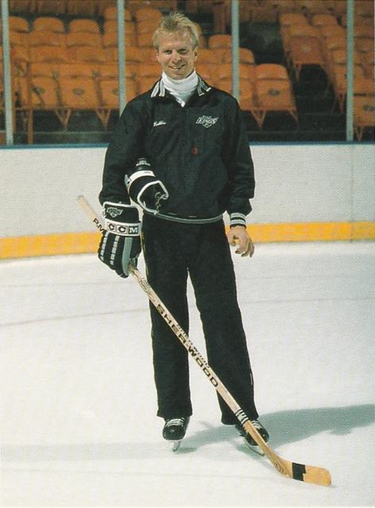
1988 postcard of Ftorek as coach of the Los Angeles Kings

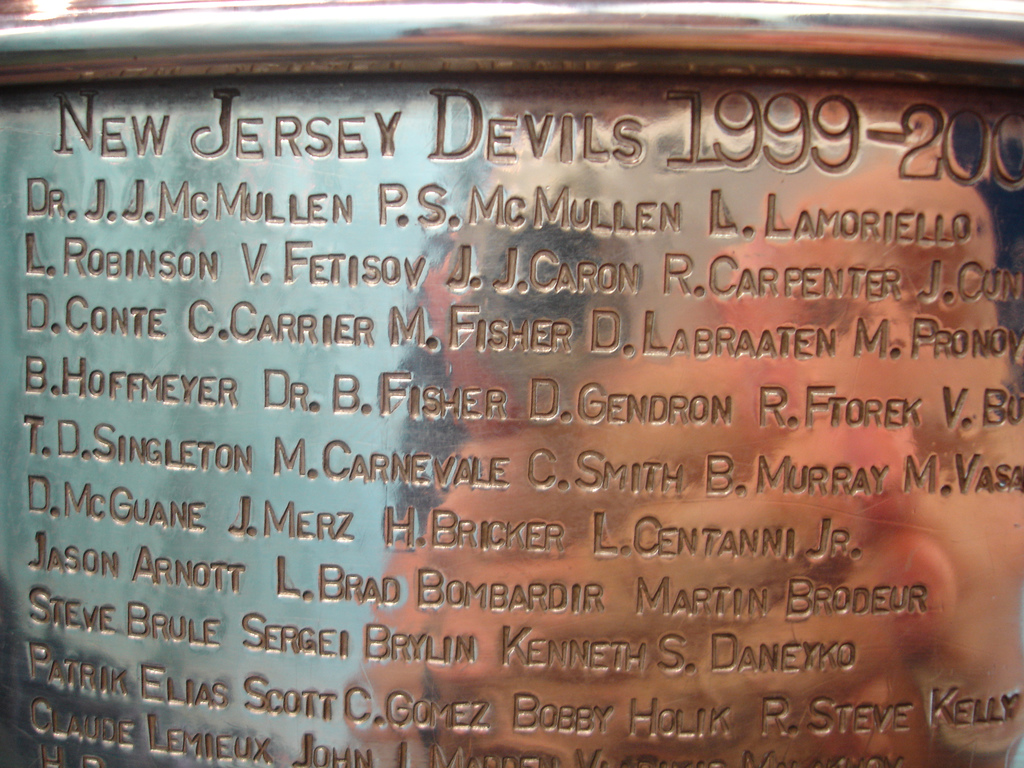
In 2000, Ftorek was fired by the Devils but still had his name engraved on the Stanley Cup.

Ftorek began his coaching career with the AHL's New Haven Nighthawks in 1985. He remained with them until the 1987–88 season when he moved up to the NHL as the Los Angeles Kings' head coach. On May 2, 1989, he was fired by the Kings for what was reported as because of his problems in communication with players, most notably with Wayne Gretzky. Following this, he was an assistant coach for the Quebec Nordiques and New Jersey Devils in the NHL. In 1992, he was named head coach of the AHL's Utica Devils - New Jersey's top farm team - and remained as head coach when the team became the Albany River Rats. In 1995, the same year the New Jersey Devils won the Stanley Cup Final, Ftorek led the River Rats to the Calder Cup in the AHL; Ftorek's name was engraved on the Stanley Cup for that year. In 1996, Ftorek began his second stint as a New Jersey Devils assistant coach, then took the head coach's position in 1998. On January 29, 2000, the Devils played a memorable game against Detroit. In the second period, the Devils' Jay Pandolfo was involved in a collision with Detroit's Mathieu Dandenault that left Pandolfo's face bloody after a collision with the boards in the Red Wings zone. The officials allowed play to continue, only for Kirk Maltby to skate down to the other end of the rink and score a goal that gave Detroit a 3–1 lead. So irate was Ftorek over play not being stopped because of Pandolfo's injury, that Ftorek hurled the Devils' wooden bench onto the ice, resulting in Ftorek's ejection from the game, and subsequent one-game suspension.

In 2000, Ftorek led the Devils back into the playoffs but was fired by Lou Lamoriello with nine games remaining in the regular season amidst complaints from the players. Dissent sources included Ken Daneyko, whom Ftorek benched two games short of 1,000 games played, making him miss out on the achievement at home. Assistant coach Larry Robinson replaced Ftorek and the Devils went on to win their second Stanley Cup. He remained with the team as a scout, and had his name engraved on the Stanley Cup for the second time in that year.

Ftorek joined the Boston Bruins as head coach in 2001. However, after two years of poor efforts by his teams, Ftorek was fired late in the 2002–03 season, again with only nine games remaining in the season. Bruins general manager Mike O'Connell took over as coach for the rest of the season. In 2003, Ftorek rejoined the Devils as head coach of their AHL affiliate in Albany. When the Devils affiliation was moved to the Lowell Devils, Ftorek was retained as head coach of the team.

Ftorek holds the dubious distinction of being the only coach to be fired by two different teams in the final days of what was a winning regular season for that team – New Jersey in 1999–2000 and Boston in 2002–03. His record was 41–20–8–5 with the Devils and 33–28–8–4 with the Bruins.

In October 2007, Ftorek was hired as the head coach of the Erie Otters of the Ontario Hockey League (OHL), replacing Peter Sidorkiewicz. Ftorek led the Otters to a 15–34–4 record over their final 53 games as the team missed the playoffs for their third consecutive season. In 2008–09, the Otters returned to the post-season as they improved to a 34–29–5 record, earning 73 points. Erie was then eliminated by the London Knights in the first round of the playoffs. The Otters made their second straight playoff appearance in 2009–10, as they had a record of 33–28–7, earning 73 points once again. Erie was eliminated in the first round once again, as the Windsor Spitfires swept the Otters in four games. The Otters improved their point total further in 2010–11, winning 40 games, and earned 82 points and a third-straight post-season appearance. Erie took the two-time Memorial Cup champions Spitfires to seven games before being eliminated. The 2011–12 campaign for Ftorek and the Erie Otters was incredibly dismal, as the Otters dealt with a rebuilding roster after losing many large stars of the previous years, ending the season with the OHL's third-worst season by a single team in its history at 10–52–6. On November 29, 2012, the Otters announced that they had relieved Ftorek of his head coaching duties.

On August 7, 2013, the Calgary Flames hired Ftorek as an assistant coach for their AHL affiliate, the Abbotsford Heat.

On November 29, 2016, Ftorek was named head coach of the ECHL's Norfolk Admirals replacing Rod Aldoff. He was released by the Admirals following an ownership change in 2019.

== Personal life ==
Ftorek and his wife Wendy have four children. His youngest daughter Anna Ftorek died suddenly of a heart attack at the family's home in Wolfeboro, New Hampshire in 2012 at the age of 23. His son, Sam, played professional hockey for 17 years, and has since followed in his footsteps as coach and was named the first coach of the Southern Professional Hockey League's expansion team, the Roanoke Rail Yard Dawgs, on April 29, 2016.

== Awards and accomplishments ==
- Ice Hockey World Championships Pool B All-Star team (1972)
- Canada Cup Team MVP (1976)
- Gordie Howe Trophy (1977)
- WHA First All-Star Team (1977, 1979)
- WHA Second All-Star Team (1976, 1978)
- WHA All-Star Game (1976, 1977, 1978, 1979)

A member of the United States Hockey Hall of Fame since 1991, Ftorek was part of the initial group of players elected to the World Hockey Association Hall of Fame in 2010. He was elected to the AHL Hall of Fame in 2020.

== Career statistics ==
=== Regular season and playoffs ===
			Regular season					Playoffs
Season	Team	League	GP	G	A	Pts	PIM	GP	G	A	Pts	PIM
1968–69	Needham High School	HS-MA	18	38	36	74	—	—	—	—	—	—
1969–70	Needham High School	HS-MA	23	54	64	118	—	—	—	—	—	—
1970–71	Halifax Atlantics	MaJrHL	28	23	37	60	34	12	15	9	24	18
1971–72	United States	Intl	51	25	47	72	36	—	—	—	—	—
1972–73	Virginia Wings	AHL	55	17	42	59	36	5	2	2	4	4
1972–73	Detroit Red Wings	NHL	3	0	0	0	0	—	—	—	—	—
1973–74	Virginia Wings	AHL	65	24	42	66	37	—	—	—	—	—
1973–74	Detroit Red Wings	NHL	12	2	5	7	4	—	—	—	—	—
1974–75	Tulsa Oilers	CHL	11	6	10	16	14	—	—	—	—	—
1974–75	Phoenix Roadrunners	WHA	53	31	37	68	29	5	2	5	7	2
1975–76	Phoenix Roadrunners	WHA	80	41	72	113	109	5	1	3	4	2
1976–77	Phoenix Roadrunners	WHA	80	46	71	117	86	—	—	—	—	—
1977–78	Cincinnati Stingers	WHA	80	59	50	109	54	—	—	—	—	—
1978–79	Cincinnati Stingers	WHA	80	39	77	116	87	3	3	2	5	6
1979–80	Quebec Nordiques	NHL	52	18	33	51	28	—	—	—	—	—
1980–81	Quebec Nordiques	NHL	78	24	49	73	104	5	1	2	3	17
1981–82	Quebec Nordiques	NHL	19	1	8	9	4	—	—	—	—	—
1981–82	New York Rangers	NHL	30	8	24	32	24	10	7	4	11	11
1982–83	New York Rangers	NHL	61	12	19	31	41	4	1	0	1	0
1983–84	Tulsa Oilers	CHL	25	11	11	22	10	9	4	5	9	2
1983–84	New York Rangers	NHL	31	3	2	5	22	—	—	—	—	—
1984–85	New Haven Nighthawks	AHL	17	9	7	16	30	—	—	—	—	—
1984–85	New York Rangers	NHL	48	9	10	19	35	—	—	—	—	—
1985–86	New Haven Nighthawks	AHL	1	0	0	0	0	—	—	—	—	—
WHA totals			373	216	307	523	365	13	6	10	16	10
NHL totals			334	77	150	227	262	19	9	6	15	28

=== International ===
Year	Team	Event	GP	G	A	Pts	PIM
1972	United States	OLY	6	0	2	2	0
1972	United States	WC B	6	7	3	10	—
1976	United States	CC	5	3	2	5	16
1981	United States	CC	4	0	0	0	0
Senior totals			15	3	4	7	16

== Head coaching record ==
=== NHL ===
Team	Year	Regular season							Postseason			
Team	Year	G	W	L	T	OTL	Pts	Finish	W	L	Win %	Result
LAK	1987–88	52	23	25	4	—	(50)	4th in Smythe	1	4	.200	Lost in First round (CGY)
LAK	1988–89	80	42	31	7	—	91	2nd in Smythe	4	7	.364	Lost in Second round (CGY)
NJD	1998–99	82	47	24	11	—	105	1st in Atlantic	3	4	.429	Lost in First round (PIT)
NJD	1999–2000	74	41	20	8	5	(95)	(fired)	—	—	—	—
BOS	2001–02	82	43	24	6	9	101	1st in Northeast	2	4	.333	Lost in First round (MTL)
BOS	2002–03	73	33	28	8	4	(78)	(fired)	—	—	—	—
NHL total		443	229	152	44	18			10	19	.345	4 playoff appearances

=== Minor league and junior coaching career ===
Team	Year	Regular season							Postseason
Team	Year	G	W	L	T	OTL	Pts	Finish	Result
New Haven Nighthawks	1985–86	80	36	37	7	—	79	4th in South	Lost in First round (HER)
New Haven Nighthawks	1986–87	80	44	25	—	11	99	3rd in South	Lost in First round (BNG)
New Haven Nighthawks	1987–88	27	16	8	3	—	(76)	5th in North	(promoted)
Halifax Citadels	1989–90	48	25	19	4	—	(80)	4th in North	(promoted)
Utica Devils	1992–93	80	33	36	11	—	77	3rd in South	Lost in First round (RCH)
Albany River Rats	1993–94	80	38	34	8		84	3rd in North	Lost in First round (POR)
Albany River Rats	1994–95	80	46	17	17	—	109	1st in North	Won Calder Cup (FRE)
Albany River Rats	1995–96	80	54	19	7	—	115	1st in North	Lost in First round (COR)
Albany River Rats	2003–04	28	7	15	3	3	(62)	7th in East	Missed playoffs
Albany River Rats	2004–05	80	29	38	6	7	71	7th in East	Missed playoffs
Albany River Rats	2005–06	80	25	48	—	7	57	7th in Atlantic	Missed playoffs
Erie Otters	2007–08	53	15	34	—	4	(40)	5th in Midwest	Missed playoffs
Erie Otters	2008–09	68	34	29	—	5	73	3rd in Midwest	Lost in First round (LON)
Erie Otters	2009–10	68	33	28	—	7	73	4th in Midwest	Lost in First round (WIN)
Erie Otters	2010–11	68	40	26	—	2	82	3rd in Midwest	Lost in First round (WIN)
Erie Otters	2011–12	68	10	52	3	3	26	5th in Midwest	Missed playoffs
Erie Otters	2012–13	27	7	15	2	3	19	(fired)	—
Norfolk Admirals	2016–17	55	24	29	0	2	(50)	7th in South	Missed playoffs
Norfolk Admirals	2017–18	72	26	39	0	7	59	6th in South	Missed playoffs
Norfolk Admirals	2018–19	72	27	36	0	9	63	6th in South	Missed playoffs

Preceded by Marc Tardif	Quebec Nordiques captain 1981	Succeeded by André Dupont
Preceded by Rogie Vachon	Head coach of the Los Angeles Kings; 1988–1989	Succeeded by Tom Webster
Preceded by Jacques Lemaire	Head coach of the New Jersey Devils; 1998–2000	Succeeded by Larry Robinson
Preceded by Mike Keenan	Head coach of the Boston Bruins; 2001–2003	Succeeded by Mike O'Connell
Preceded by Peter Sidorkiewicz	Head coach of the Erie Otters; 2007–2012	Succeeded by Kris Knoblauch
