= Dave Dryden =

Canadian ice hockey player (1941–2022)

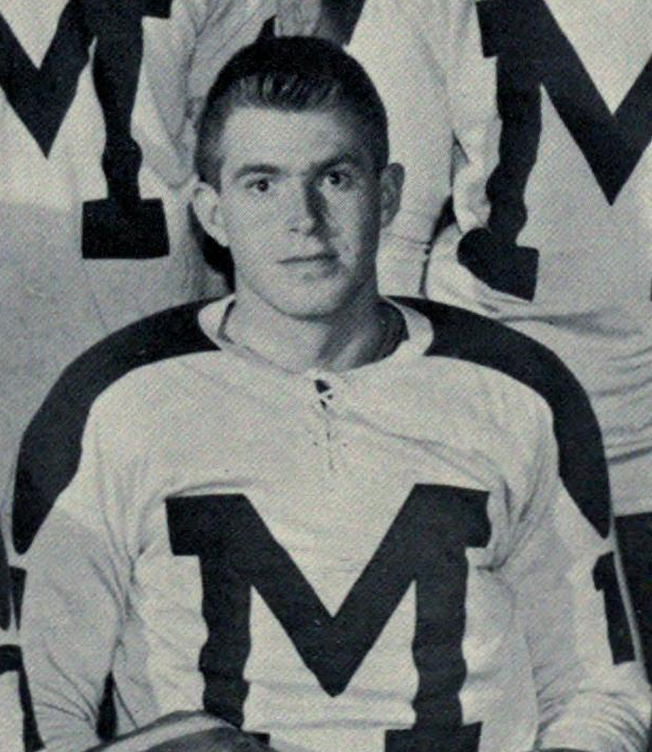
- Dryden with the St. Michaels Majors, c. 1961
- Born: September 5, 1941 Hamilton, Ontario, Canada
- Died: October 4, 2022 (aged 81) Oakville, Ontario, Canada
- Height: 6 ft 1 in (185 cm)
- Weight: 186 lb (84 kg; 13 st 4 lb)
- Position: Goaltender
- Caught: Left
- Played for: New York Rangers; Chicago Black Hawks; Buffalo Sabres; Chicago Cougars; Edmonton Oilers
- Playing career: 1962–1979

David Murray Dryden (September 5, 1941 – October 4, 2022) was a Canadian professional ice hockey goaltender, who created and first used the modern goaltending mask, consisting of fibreglass and a cage. From 1962 to 1980, he played nine seasons in the National Hockey League (NHL) for the New York Rangers, Chicago Black Hawks, Buffalo Sabres, and Edmonton Oilers, and in the World Hockey Association between 1974 and 1979 with the Chicago Cougars and Edmonton Oilers. In the 1978–79 season, at the age of 37, Dryden led the Oilers to the best record in WHA with 41 wins and became the first player in franchise history to win a league Most Valuable Player award. He was the only goaltender to win the WHA's MVP award. When the team made the NHL the following year, he played 14 games to close out his career.

== Early life ==
Dryden was born in Hamilton, Ontario, on September 5, 1941. His father, Murray, worked as a brick salesman and became a philanthropist; his mother, Margaret (Campbell), was a kindergarten teacher. He was the older brother of Ken Dryden. Dryden began his junior career with the Aurora Bears in 1958, before playing two seasons for the St. Michael's Majors of the Ontario Hockey Association (OHA). He then joined the Toronto Marlboros in 1961.

== Professional career ==
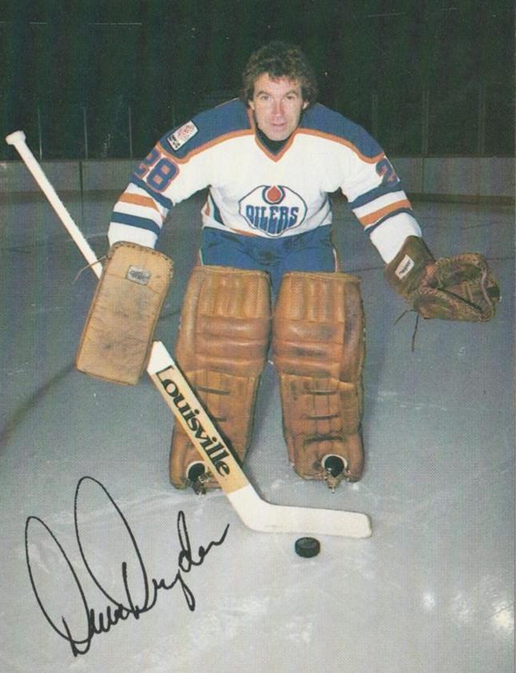
Dryden in 1979 for the Edmonton Oilers.

Dryden played in the National Hockey League (NHL) and World Hockey Association (WHA) from 1962 to 1979, playing for the New York Rangers, Buffalo Sabres, Chicago Black Hawks, Chicago Cougars, and Edmonton Oilers. He made his NHL debut on February 3, 1962, with the Rangers, serving as an emergency backup for Gump Worsley. On March 20, 1971, in a game between his Sabres and the Montreal Canadiens, Dryden faced his brother Ken, the first time in the history of the NHL that brothers opposed each other as goalies. The brothers met again five more times.

Dryden's best years came in the WHA while playing for the Oilers. Of all the Oilers' goaltenders during their membership in the WHA, he played the most games (197) and earned the most wins (94). He was the goalie against whom Wayne Gretzky scored his first professional goal – during Gretzky's short stint with the Indianapolis Racers, before quickly becoming Dryden's teammate with the Oilers. Dryden won the Ben Hatskin Trophy as the WHA's top goaltender and the Gordie Howe Trophy as league MVP in 1979, and he was named to the First Team All-Stars. Two years prior, Dryden designed the first mask-cage combination goalie mask; maskmaker Greg Harrison transferred his design drawings into a final product which Dryden wore for the Oilers. The mask is on display at the Hockey Hall of Fame in Toronto. The mask-cage combination goalie mask is now the norm in modern hockey.

== Personal life ==
Dryden served as a teacher for a number of years when not playing hockey. Dryden was married to Sandra for 59 years until his death. Together, they had two children. He was the brother of Ken Dryden. He was the chairperson of Sleeping Children Around the World charity (founded by his father) which provides bed kits to children in developing countries.

Dryden died on October 4, 2022, at the age of 81, from complications following surgery for chronic thromboembolic pulmonary hypertension. Sleeping Children Around the World and the National Hockey League announced that they would be launching a donation initiative in his name to provide bed kits to children in developing countries.

== Awards and achievements ==
- Played in 1974 NHL All-Star Game
- Won the 1979 Ben Hatskin Trophy as the WHA's top goaltender
- World Hockey Association most valuable player, 1979 (Gordie Howe Trophy)
- 1978–79 WHA season World Hockey Association First Team All-Star

== Career statistics ==
=== Regular season and playoffs ===
| | | | Regular season | | | | | | | | | Playoffs |
| Season | Team | League | GP | W | L | T | MIN | GA | SO | GAA | SV% | GP | W | L | MIN | GA | SO | GAA | SV% |
|---|---|---|---|---|---|---|---|---|---|---|---|---|---|---|---|---|---|---|---|
| 1958–59 | Aurora Bears | MetJHL | 48 | — | — | — | 2880 | 170 | 3 | 3.54 | — | — | — | — | — | — | — | — | — |
| 1959–60 | St. Michael's Majors | OHA | 12 | 5 | 6 | 1 | 720 | 39 | 1 | 3.25 | — | 1 | 0 | 0 | 20 | 2 | 0 | 6.00 | — |
| 1960–61 | St. Michael's Majors | OHA | 18 | — | — | — | 1080 | 66 | 1 | 3.67 | — | — | — | — | — | — | — | — | — |
| 1961–62 | Toronto Marlboros | MetJHL | 32 | 17 | 8 | 6 | 1880 | 99 | 3 | 3.16 | — | 12 | 7 | 5 | 720 | 49 | 0 | 4.08 | — |
| 1961–62 | New York Rangers | NHL | 1 | 0 | 1 | 0 | 40 | 3 | 0 | 4.50 | .885 | — | — | — | — | — | — | — | — |
| 1961–62 | Rochester Americans | AHL | 1 | 0 | 0 | 0 | 20 | 2 | 0 | 6.00 | — | — | — | — | — | — | — | — | — |
| 1962–63 | Galt Hornets | OHA Sr | 40 | — | — | — | 2400 | 174 | 2 | 4.35 | — | 4 | — | — | 240 | 27 | 0 | 6.75 | — |
| 1963–64 | Galt Hornets | OHA Sr | 39 | — | — | — | 2340 | 141 | 0 | 3.62 | — | 11 | 6 | 5 | 660 | 36 | 1 | 3.27 | — |
| 1964–65 | Galt Hornets | OHA Sr | 35 | — | — | — | 2040 | 106 | 1 | 3.12 | — | 1 | 0 | 1 | 60 | 6 | 0 | 6.00 | — |
| 1964–65 | Buffalo Bisons | AHL | 4 | 4 | 0 | 0 | 240 | 6 | 1 | 1.50 | — | — | — | — | — | — | — | — | — |
| 1965–66 | Chicago Black Hawks | NHL | 11 | 3 | 4 | 1 | 453 | 23 | 0 | 3.05 | .921 | 1 | 0 | 0 | 13 | 0 | 0 | 0.00 | 1.000 |
| 1966–67 | St. Louis Braves | CPHL | 48 | 17 | 17 | 14 | 2880 | 158 | 2 | 3.29 | — | — | — | — | — | — | — | — | — |
| 1967–68 | Chicago Black Hawks | NHL | 27 | 9 | 9 | 2 | 1268 | 69 | 1 | 3.26 | .900 | — | — | — | — | — | — | — | — |
| 1968–69 | Chicago Black Hawks | NHL | 30 | 12 | 11 | 2 | 1475 | 79 | 3 | 3.21 | .904 | — | — | — | — | — | — | — | — |
| 1969–70 | Dallas Black Hawks | CHL | 2 | 0 | 2 | 0 | 120 | 6 | 0 | 3.00 | — | — | — | — | — | — | — | — | — |
| 1970–71 | Buffalo Sabres | NHL | 10 | 3 | 3 | 0 | 409 | 23 | 1 | 3.37 | .900 | — | — | — | — | — | — | — | — |
| 1970–71 | Salt Lake Golden Eagles | WHL | 8 | 1 | 6 | 0 | 364 | 34 | 0 | 5.60 | — | — | — | — | — | — | — | — | — |
| 1971–72 | Buffalo Sabres | NHL | 20 | 3 | 9 | 5 | 1026 | 68 | 0 | 3.98 | .887 | — | — | — | — | — | — | — | — |
| 1972–73 | Buffalo Sabres | NHL | 37 | 14 | 13 | 7 | 2018 | 89 | 3 | 2.65 | .908 | 2 | 0 | 2 | 120 | 9 | 0 | 4.50 | .873 |
| 1973–74 | Buffalo Sabres | NHL | 53 | 23 | 20 | 8 | 2987 | 148 | 1 | 2.97 | .894 | — | — | — | — | — | — | — | — |
| 1974–75 | Chicago Cougars | WHA | 45 | 18 | 26 | 1 | 2728 | 176 | 1 | 3.87 | .895 | — | — | — | — | — | — | — | — |
| 1975–76 | Edmonton Oilers | WHA | 62 | 22 | 34 | 5 | 3567 | 235 | 1 | 3.95 | .878 | 3 | 0 | 3 | 180 | 15 | 0 | 5.00 | — |
| 1976–77 | Edmonton Oilers | WHA | 24 | 10 | 13 | 0 | 1416 | 77 | 1 | 3.26 | .889 | — | — | — | — | — | — | — | — |
| 1977–78 | Edmonton Oilers | WHA | 48 | 21 | 23 | 2 | 2578 | 150 | 2 | 3.49 | .879 | 2 | 0 | 1 | 91 | 6 | 0 | 3.96 | — |
| 1978–79 | Edmonton Oilers | WHA | 63 | 41 | 17 | 2 | 3531 | 170 | 3 | 2.89 | .890 | 13 | 6 | 7 | 687 | 42 | 0 | 3.67 | — |
| 1979–80 | Edmonton Oilers | NHL | 14 | 2 | 7 | 3 | 744 | 53 | 0 | 4.27 | .848 | — | — | — | — | — | — | — | — |
| WHA totals | | | 242 | 112 | 113 | 10 | 13,820 | 808 | 8 | 3.51 | .886 | 18 | 6 | 11 | 958 | 63 | 0 | 3.95 | — |
| NHL totals | | | 203 | 69 | 77 | 28 | 10,420 | 555 | 9 | 3.20 | .897 | 3 | 0 | 2 | 133 | 9 | 0 | 4.06 | .885 |
