= Murray Dryden =

Canadian philanthropist (1911–2004)

- Born: October 14, 1911; Domain, Manitoba
- Died: February 1, 2004 (aged 92); Toronto, Ontario
- Known for: Philanthropist
- Children: 3 including Ken and Dave

Murray Dryden, CM (October 14, 1911 – February 1, 2004) was a Canadian philanthropist. He was also the father of Hockey Hall of Famer and politician Ken Dryden, Dave Dryden and Judy Dryden.

== Biography ==
Born in Domain, Manitoba, the eldest of eight children of Scottish parents, Dryden worked on his family's 408-acre (1.65 km^{2}) farm until finishing grade 11 in 1928 when he moved to Winnipeg to look for a job. In 1932, he found work selling plant food in Hamilton, Ontario and married Margaret Campbell in 1938. They had three children: Ken, Dave, and Judy. In 1948, Dryden moved with his family to Etobicoke, in the western portion of Toronto, where he sold building materials. An amateur photographer, he enjoyed taking pictures of children at sleep.

In 1970, after retiring, Dryden founded with his wife the charity Sleeping Children Around the World (SCAW), whose mission is to "give bed kits to needy children in developing countries". He was made a Member of the Order of Canada in 1981 for this work. As of 2008, SCAW has raised over Can$20 million and provided bed kits to over 900,000 children in 33 countries. In 1988, Dryden sold three Christmas tree farms for Can$3.5 million to ensure SCAW will be able to give 100% of its donations to help children.

In 1972, Dryden and Jim Hunt wrote the book Playing the Shots at Both Ends: The Story of Ken and Dave Dryden (ISBN 0-07-077505-2).
