= 1974 WHA All-Star Game =

	1	2	3	Total
East	5	1	2	8
West	1	3	0	4
- Date: January 3, 1974
- Arena: St. Paul Civic Center
- City: St. Paul, Minnesota
- MVP: Mike Walton
- Attendance: 13,196

The 1974 World Hockey Association All-Star Game was held in the just opened St. Paul Civic Center in St. Paul, Minnesota, home of the Minnesota Fighting Saints, on January 3, 1974. The East All-Stars defeated the West All-Stars 8–4. Mike Walton was named the game's Most Valuable Player.

== Team Lineups ==
=== East All-Stars ===
- Coach: Jack Kelley (New England Whalers)

Nat.	Player	Pos.	Team
Goaltenders
(Canada)	Gerry Cheevers		Cleveland Crusaders
(Canada)	Gilles Gratton		Toronto Toros
(Canada)	Al Smith^{†}		New England Whalers
Defencemen
(Canada)	Rick Ley		New England Whalers
(Canada)	J. C. Tremblay		Quebec Nordiques
(Canada)	Pat Stapleton		Chicago Cougars
(Canada)	Paul Shmyr		Cleveland Crusaders
(Canada)	Brad Selwood		New England Whalers
(Canada)	Jim Dorey		New England Whalers
(Canada)	Dale Hoganson^{‡}		Quebec Nordiques
Forwards
(United States)	Larry Pleau	C	New England Whalers
(Canada)	Ralph Backstrom	C	Chicago Cougars
(Canada)	Andre Lacroix	C	New York Golden Blades
(Canada)	Serge Bernier	C	Quebec Nordiques
(United States)	Bobby Sheehan^{‡}	C	New York Golden Blades
(Canada)	Gerry Pinder	RW	Cleveland Crusaders
(Canada)	Tom Webster	RW	New England Whalers
(Canada)	Rosaire Paiement	RW	Chicago Cougars
(Canada)	Tom Simpson	RW	Toronto Toros
(Canada)	Rejean Houle	LW	Quebec Nordiques
(Canada)	Wayne Carleton	LW	Toronto Toros
(Canada)	Gary Jarrett	LW	Cleveland Crusaders
(Canada)	Hugh Harris	LW	New England Whalers

- ^{†} Suited, but did not play.
- ^{‡} Unable to participate due to injury.

=== West All-Stars ===
- Coach: Bobby Hull (Winnipeg Jets)
  Assisted by: Nick Mickoski (Winnipeg Jets)

Nat.	Player	Pos.	Team
Goaltenders
(Canada)	Ernie Wakely		Winnipeg Jets
(Canada)	Jack Norris		Edmonton Oilers
(Canada)	John Garrett		Minnesota Fighting Saints
Defencemen
(Canada)	Rick Smith		Minnesota Fighting Saints
(Canada)	Al Hamilton		Edmonton Oilers
(Canada)	Gerry Odrowski		Los Angeles Sharks
(Denmark)	Poul Popiel		Houston Aeros
(Canada)	Bart Crashley		Los Angeles Sharks
(Canada)	Ralph MacSweyn		Vancouver Blazers
(Canada)	Larry Hornung^{‡}		Winnipeg Jets
Forwards
(Canada)	Mike Walton	C	Minnesota Fighting Saints
(Canada)	Larry Lund	C	Houston Aeros
(Canada)	Bryan Campbell	C	Vancouver Blazers
(Canada)	Fran Huck	C	Winnipeg Jets
(Canada)	Ross Perkins	C	Edmonton Oilers
(Canada)	Jim Harrison^{‡}	C	Edmonton Oilers
(Canada)	Wayne Connelly	RW	Minnesota Fighting Saints
(Canada)	Gordie Howe	RW	Houston Aeros
(Canada)	Danny Lawson	RW	Vancouver Blazers
(Canada)	Frank Hughes	RW	Houston Aeros
(Canada)	Bobby Hull	LW	Winnipeg Jets
(Canada)	Ron Climie	LW	Edmonton Oilers
(Canada)	Marc Tardif	LW	Los Angeles Sharks

- ^{‡} Unable to participate due to injury.

G = Goaltender; D = Defenceman; C = Center; LW = Left Wing; RW = Right Wing

== Game summary ==
#	Score	Team	Goalscorer (Assist(s))	Time
First period
1	0-1	East	Houle (Bernier, Paiement)	2:11
2	0-2	East	Backstrom (Carleton, Stapleton)	8:02 (sh)
3	0-3	East	Pleau (unassisted)	10:39
4	1-3	West	Walton (Lawson)	14:55
5	1-4	East	Pinder (Lacroix, Shmyr)	18:38
6	1-5	East	Lacroix (Pinder, Jarrett)	19:12
Penalties : Ley (East) 6:34
Second period
7	2-5	West	Walton (Hull, Tardif)	7:27 (pp)
8	2-6	East	Paiement (Backstrom)	9:15
9	3-6	West	Walton (Hamilton, Climie)	16:04
10	4-6	West	Lund (Hughes, Hamilton)	17:28
Penalties : Webster (East) 6:31
Third period
11	4-7	East	Lacroix (Jarrett, Pinder)	9:17
12	4-8	East	Pleau (Harris, Webster)	18:59
Penalties : Climie (West) 2:43

Goaltenders :

- East: Cheevers (29:15 minutes, 2 goals against), Gratton (30:45 minutes, 2 goals against).
- West: Norris (20 minutes, 5 goals against), Wakely (20 minutes, 1 goal against), Garrett (20 minutes, 2 goals against).

Shots on goal :

- East (34) 10 - 12 - 10
- West (30) 10 - 13 - 7

Referee : Bob Sloan

Linesmen : Alan Glaspell, Gene Kusy

== See also ==
- 1973–74 WHA season
