= Barry Long (ice hockey) =

Canadian ice hockey player and coach

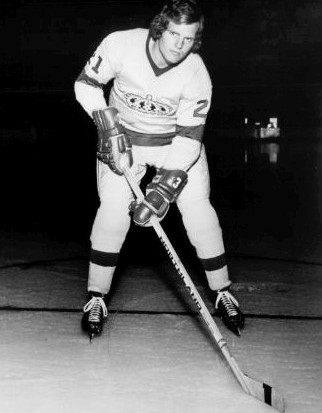
- Born: January 3, 1949 (age 77) Red Deer, Alberta, Canada
- Height: 6 ft 3 in (191 cm)
- Weight: 220 lb (100 kg; 15 st 10 lb)
- Position: Defence
- Shot: Left
- Played for: Los Angeles Kings; Edmonton Oilers; Winnipeg Jets; Detroit Red Wings
- Playing career: 1968–1982

Barry Kenneth Long (born January 3, 1949) is a Canadian former professional ice hockey player and coach.

== Early life ==
Long was born in Red Deer, Alberta. He began his career with the Moose Jaw Canucks of the Saskatchewan Junior Hockey League and then played with the Central Hockey League's Dallas Black Hawks.

== Career ==
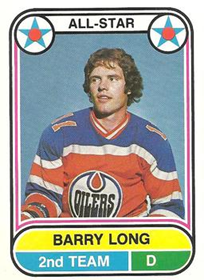
1975-76 card of Long of the Edmonton Oilers, where he had been named a Second Team All-Star for the 1974-75 season in the WHA

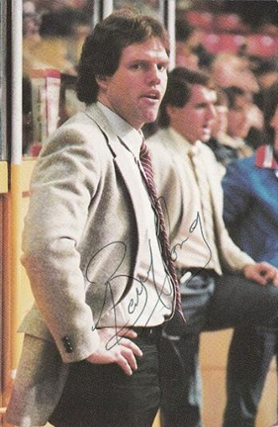
1983-84 photo of Long for the Winnipeg Jets as coach

Coveted as a third-line defensive forward, Long signed with the Los Angeles Kings of the National Hockey League in 1972. Seeking a more offensive role, after two years with the team, he signed with the Edmonton Oilers of the World Hockey Association. He scored 20 goals in 1974–75 and was named to the Second All-Star Team for the league. After one more solid season with Edmonton, he was traded to the Winnipeg Jets. Long was again named to the Second All-Star Team after the 1977-78 season.

In the draft that followed the merger, Long was claimed by the Detroit Red Wings. After one year with this club, he returned to the Jets, playing one full season before suffering a career-ending injury five games into the 1981–82 campaign that required surgery to fix the circulation problem in his hand. Upon retirement, he became a Winnipeg assistant, and during the 1983–84 season, he became head coach. In 1984–85, Long's club finished with 96 points and won a first-round playoff series, but a poor start during the next campaign led to his firing after 66 games.

== Career statistics ==
=== Regular season and playoffs ===
			Regular season					Playoffs
Season	Team	League	GP	G	A	Pts	PIM	GP	G	A	Pts	PIM
1966–67	Moose Jaw Canucks	CMJHL	56	8	11	19	148	14	3	9	12	16
1967–68	Moose Jaw Canucks	WCJHL	52	11	33	44	202	13	4	2	6	12
1968–69	Dallas Black Hawks	CHL	46	4	11	15	85	—	—	—	—	—
1969–70	Dallas Black Hawks	CHL	71	11	22	33	127	—	—	—	—	—
1970–71	Dallas Black Hawks	CHL	72	9	24	33	90	10	1	0	1	10
1971–72	Portland Buckaroos	WHL	66	14	33	47	52	11	3	7	10	8
1972–73	Los Angeles Kings	NHL	70	2	13	15	48	—	—	—	—	—
1973–74	Los Angeles Kings	NHL	60	3	19	22	118	5	0	1	1	18
1974–75	Edmonton Oilers	WHA	78	20	40	60	116	—	—	—	—	—
1975–76	Edmonton Oilers	WHA	78	10	32	42	66	4	0	0	0	4
1976–77	Edmonton Oilers	WHA	2	0	1	1	2	—	—	—	—	—
1976–77	Winnipeg Jets	WHA	71	9	38	47	54	20	1	5	6	10
1977–78	Winnipeg Jets	WHA	78	7	24	31	42	9	0	5	5	6
1978–79	Winnipeg Jets	WHA	80	5	36	41	42	10	2	3	5	0
1979–80	Detroit Red Wings	NHL	80	0	17	17	38	—	—	—	—	—
1980–81	Winnipeg Jets	NHL	65	6	17	23	42	—	—	—	—	—
1981–82	Winnipeg Jets	NHL	5	0	2	2	4	—	—	—	—	—
CHL totals			189	24	57	81	302	10	1	0	1	10
NHL totals			280	11	68	79	250	5	0	1	1	18
WHA totals			387	51	171	222	322	43	3	13	16	20

=== International ===
Year	Team	Event	GP	G	A	Pts	PIM
1981	Canada	WC	7	1	0	1	8

== Coaching record ==
Team	Year	Regular Season						Post Season
Team	Year	G	W	L	T	Pts	Finish	Result
Winnipeg Jets	1983–84	59	25	25	9	(73)	4th in Smythe	Lost in Division Semi Finals
Winnipeg Jets	1984–85	80	43	27	10	96	2nd in Smythe	Lost in Division Finals
Winnipeg Jets	1985–86	66	19	41	6	(59)	3rd in Smythe	(Fired)
NHL Total		205	87	93	25			

Preceded by Lars-Erik Sjoberg	Winnipeg Jets captains 1978–79	Succeeded by Lars-Erik Sjöberg
Preceded by Tom Watt	Head coach of the Winnipeg Jets; 1983–86	Succeeded by John Ferguson, Sr.
