= Gerry Cheevers =

Canadian ice hockey player (born 1940)

- Hockey Hall of Fame, 1985
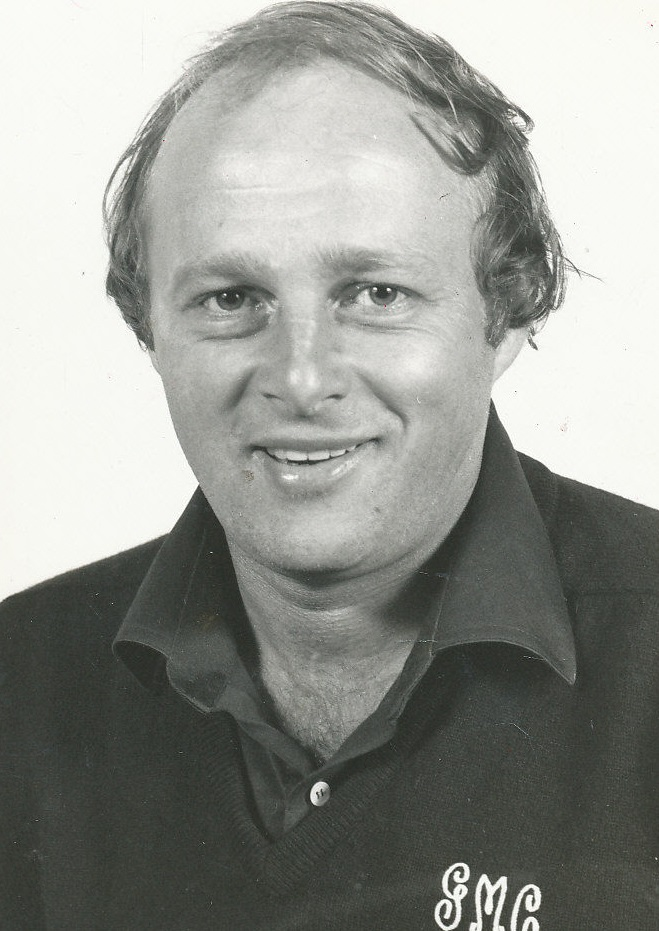
- Cheevers in 1983
- Born: 7 December 1940 (age 85) St. Catharines, Ontario, Canada
- Height: 5 ft 11 in (180 cm)
- Weight: 190 lb (86 kg; 13 st 8 lb)
- Position: Goaltender
- Caught: Left
- Played for: Toronto Maple Leafs; Boston Bruins; Cleveland Crusaders
- National team: Canada
- Playing career: 1961–1980
- Coaching career: 1980–1985
- Website: www.gerrycheevers.com

Gerald Michael Cheevers (born December 7, 1940) is a Canadian former professional ice hockey goaltender who played in the National Hockey League (NHL) and World Hockey Association (WHA) between 1961 and 1980. Cheevers is best known for his two stints with the Boston Bruins, whom he helped win the Stanley Cup in 1970 and 1972. Cheevers won more than 300 games between two professional leagues. He was inducted into the Hockey Hall of Fame in 1985.

Following his retirement, he coached the Bruins from 1980 to 1985. He subsequently worked as a commentator for both the Hartford Whalers and Bruins.

He was the first to decorate his goaltender mask with stitch markings where a puck had struck, leading to the contemporary tradition of goaltenders decorating their masks.

== Playing career ==
=== Early years (1956–1961) ===
Cheevers played minor ice hockey at St. Catharines. At age 16 in 1956, he played for Toronto St. Michael's Majors in the Ontario Hockey Association. After consecutive seasons playing a single game for the Majors, and six games in the 1958–59 season, he became the starting goalie for the 1959–60 season and went 18–13–5 with a 3.08 goals against average (GAA), and won the Dave Pinkney Trophy for lowest GAA in the league. In the 1961 playoffs, he led the Majors to the J. Ross Robertson Cup championship, the George Richardson Memorial Trophy championship and the 1961 Memorial Cup championship, with a shutout in the first game. Cheevers played part of that final junior season as a forward.

=== Start of professional career (1961–1965) ===
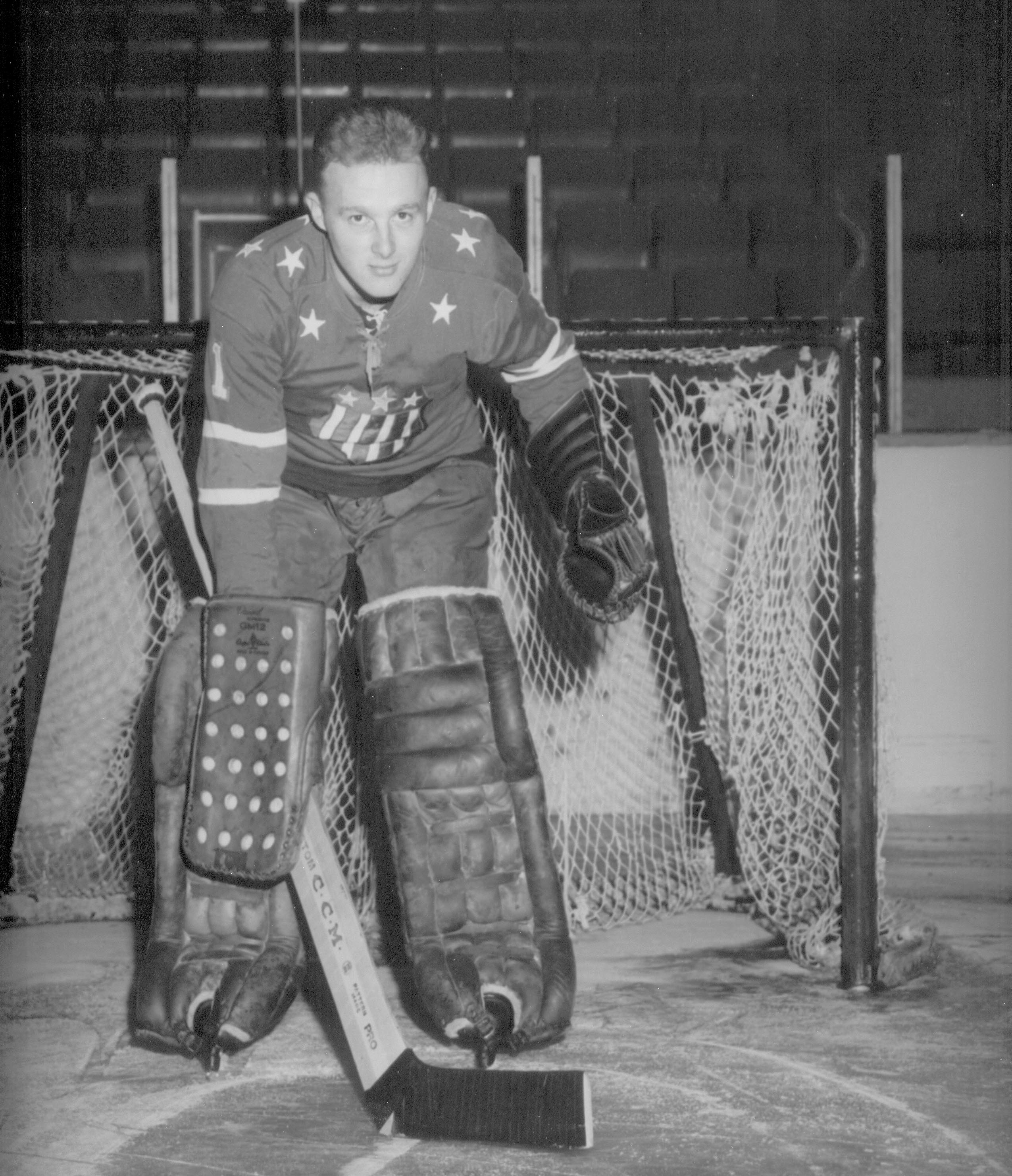
Cheevers with the Rochester Americans

With the Toronto Maple Leafs holding the rights to sign Cheevers, he started the 1961–62 season with their Sault Thunderbirds farm team in the EPHL, playing in 29 games with a 13–13–3 record with 3.55 GAA. He followed his stint with the Thunderbirds with five games in the AHL for the Pittsburgh Hornets. Also during the 1962 season, Cheevers made his NHL debut for the Maple Leafs on December 2, 1961, making 35 saves in a 6–4 victory over the visiting Chicago Black Hawks. Cheevers then finished out the year playing for his fifth different team of the year, appearing in 19 games for the Rochester Americans, as well as in four playoff games.

Similarly, Cheevers split time between two teams in the 1962–63 season, starting for the Sudbury Wolves of the EPHL in 51 games. He appeared in all eight playoff games helping the team reach the finals, where they were defeated 4–1 by the Kingston Frontenacs. Cheevers also played 19 games for Rochester that year, finishing with a losing record of 7–9–3 with one shutout.

For his final two seasons in the minors, Cheevers played exclusively with Rochester and was their starting goaltender. During the 1963–64 season, Cheevers started 66 games of the regular season, going 38–25–2 with three shutouts and a 2.84 GAA.

Cheevers' final season in the minors came in the 1964–65 AHL season, where he was the final goaltender in league history to play every game (coincidentally, he did this one season after his future Bruins teammate Eddie Johnston was the final goaltender to do so in the NHL). He finished the year with a record 48–21–2 (with the wins being a league and team record) to go with five shutouts and league-best 2.69 GAA; he was awarded the Harry "Hap" Holmes Memorial Award as the league's best goaltender. During the postseason, Cheevers went 4–1 in the first round, resulting in Rochester earning a second round bye to the championship series. Rochester defeated the Hershey Bears for the Calder Cup championship.

=== First stint with the Bruins (1966–1972) ===
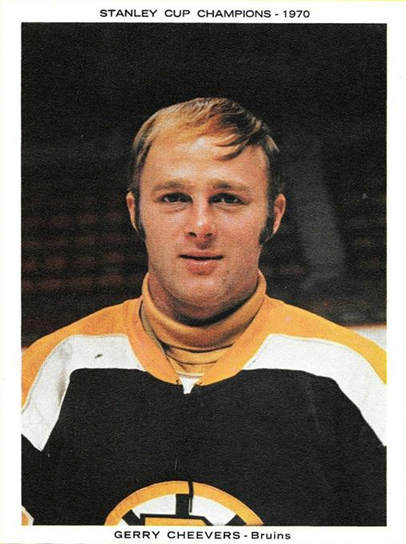
1970 photo of Cheevers with the Boston Bruins, who won the Stanley Cup that year under his goaltending.

The Boston Bruins drafted Cheevers in 1965, despite Toronto general manager Punch Imlach trying to slip him through unselected by listing him as a forward. He saw his first action with the Bruins in the 1965–66 season, playing in seven games, although he spent the bulk of the that season with the Bruins' farm club, the Oklahoma City Blazers of the Central Professional Hockey League. During the 1965-66 season, Cheevers went 16–9–5 with a 2.49 GAA. In the postseason, Cheevers was a near perfect 8–1 as he helped the team defeat the Minnesota Rangers to win the Adams Cup. In the following season of 1967-68, Cheevers split his time with the Bruins and the Blazers, playing in 22 games for Boston. He recorded his 1st NHL shutout on November 10, 1966, versus the Toronto Maple Leafs. He made 26 appearances for the Blazers, where he had a 14–6–5 record with a 2.80 GAA, as he helped them repeat as Adams Cup champions, going 8–3 during the postseason.

With the six-team expansion in 1967, and the Bruins losing goaltenders Bernie Parent and Doug Favell to the expansion Philadelphia Flyers, Cheevers became the number one goaltender in Boston for the next five seasons.

Cheevers' first full season as a starter for the Bruins came in the 1967–68 NHL season, where he finished with a winning record of 23–17–5 along with a 2.83 GAA, and a .907 save percentage. He also started to wear a mask regularly, the first time being on October 11, 1967. He helped the Bruins make the playoffs for the first time in eight seasons, but they were swept in the first round by Montreal. Cheevers had another solid year in the 1968–69 NHL season, going 28–12–12 with a 2.80 GAA. During the postseason, Cheevers recorded his first playoff shutout on April 2 vs the Toronto Maple Leafs and recorded his second the following day as the Bruins reached the semifinals, where they were defeated by Montreal in six games.

The following year in the 1969–70 NHL season, Cheevers had a break-out season and started the year with a shutout streak of 151 minutes, 26 seconds. After shutouts of Oakland (6–0) and Pittsburgh (4–0), Cheevers' streak ended at on October 25 at the 31:26 mark of the Bruins' 4–2 win in Oakland. He went on to finish the year with a record of 24–8–8 with four shutouts, a 2.72 GAA, and an improved .919 save percentage. During the postseason, Cheevers went a nearly perfect 12–1 to bring home Boston's first cup in 29 years.

Cheevers had another great season the following year going 27–8–5 with a 2.73 GAA and .918 SV% with three shutouts, as the Bruins finished with a league best record. However, he and the Bruins were upset by the Montreal Canadiens in the first round of the playoffs. Cheevers and the Bruins bounced back in the following season, as he went undefeated in 32 consecutive games, an NHL record that still stands. He finished the year with a 27–5–8 record, achieving career bests in both GAA, with 2.50, and a .920 SV%. During the postseason, Cheevers split time with Eddie Johnston, and went 6–2 with two shutouts, with the last one being in the decisive Game 6 as Boston won their second Cup in three years.

Throughout this time, he started gaining a reputation as a driven, "money" goaltender. Cheevers held the Boston Bruins' record for most playoff wins by a goaltender (53) until it was surpassed by Tuukka Rask in 2021. Former Bruins general manager Milt Schmidt once stated in his 2002 book Without Fear that "Cheesy (Cheevers) was a big-money player, one of the greatest. When the need was there to make one big save to save a game, Cheesy was there."

=== Jump to the WHA (1972–1976) ===
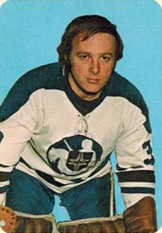
Cheevers with the Cleveland Crusaders in the c. 1973

On July 27, 1972, Cheevers signed with the upstart Cleveland Crusaders of the World Hockey Association for the 1972–73 WHA season. He would ultimately play over three seasons for the Cleveland Crusaders. He later commented on his surprising exit from the Bruins:

I was struggling to make the money I thought I deserved with the Bruins, They had a negotiator who was a pretty hardcore guy. He was a lawyer and didn't know much about Hockey. They offered me a very minimal raise. It sort of hit me. I called Tommy Johnson, who was our coach, and said, 'Tommy, I can't take this. I've got an offer that'll stagger you.' He said, 'Don't do anything. Come back in three or four days,' so I came back in three or four days and Tommy said, 'I'm here to offer you whatever the other team offered you.' I told him what Cleveland offered and he said, 'Can't do it, Gerry. Do they need a coach?

On October 11, 1972, the first day that teams played regular season hockey in the WHA, Cheevers recorded the first-ever league shutout, doing so against the Quebec Nordiques. Cheevers finished the year with a 32–20–2 record, and led the league in almost every goaltending statistic, including league-leading totals for GAA (2.84), shutouts (5), and save percentage (.912). Cheevers' play resulted in him winning the league's Ben Hatskin Award for best goaltender, being named to the First All-Star Team, and finishing second in league MVP voting. Cheevers and the Crusaders swept Philadelphia in the first round, but lost to the first-seeded New England Whalers in the second round in five games.

Throughout the rest of his tenure in the WHA, Cheevers continued to be one of the league's best goaltenders. He finished the 1973-74 season with a 30–20–6 record, once again leading the league with five shutouts. He was named a Second Team All-Star. In 1974, Cheevers played in seven of the eight games for Team Canada in the 1974 Summit Series.

Cheevers' final full year in the WHA was the 1974-75 season, where he went 26–24–2 overall and finished with a league best four shutouts. He was once again named a Second Team All-Star. Cheevers played half of the 1975–76 WHA season with the Crusaders, where he went 11-14-1 before leaving to rejoin the Boston Bruins midway through the season. In nearly four seasons, Cheevers played in the All-Star Game each time.

=== Return to the Bruins (1976–1980) ===
Cheevers returned to the Bruins during the 1975–76 season after a financial dispute with the Crusaders' management compelled him to leave Cleveland on January 26, 1976. Gerry signed his new Bruins contract on February 3, and on February 8, 1976, he played his first NHL game in nearly four years and got a 7–0 shutout win over the Detroit Red Wings. He finished out the year with an 8–2–5 record, appearing in six playoff games as the Bruins were eliminated in the second round. In the 1976–77 season, he split time in the net with Gilles Gilbert. In 45 starts, Cheevers went 30–10–5, finishing the year with a .882 SV% and 3.04 GAA to go along with three shutouts. During the postseason Cheevers started all fourteen games, leading the Bruins past Los Angeles and Philadelphia to reach the Stanley Cup Final, where Boston was swept by the Canadiens.

The 1977-78 season saw Cheevers lose the starting job to Ron Grahame. In a backup role, Cheevers started 21 games and had a 10–5–2 record with a 2.65 GAA and a .887 SV%. However, when it came to the postseason, Cheevers reclaimed the starting job, appearing in twelve of the fifteen playoff games that saw the Bruins reach the Stanley Cup Final, where Boston lost in six games. At the start of the 1978–79 NHL season, Cheevers once regained the starting role, and went on a lengthy unbeaten streak of sixteen games to start off the season. He finished the season with a 23–9–10 record, although he had a 3.16 GAA along with a career worst .865 SV%. During the postseason Cheevers once again split time with Gilbert. Boston advanced to the semifinal round against Montreal and were on the verge of winning Game 7 when the team committed a penalty for too many men on the ice. Guy Lafleur tied the game on the powerplay with 1:14 to go before Yvon Lambert scored the game-winner nine minutes into overtime.

In December 1979, he was selected as an NHL All–Star for the Challenge Cup to face off against the Soviet Union, playing in the last game of the series, which resulted in a 6–0 loss. In the 1979–80 season, Cheevers started 42 games going 24–11–7 overall, with four shutouts, a 2.81 GAA and a .881 SV%. During a game on April 2, 1980, Cheevers set the single season NHL regular season record for penalty minutes by a goaltender (62). In a 5–2 win over the Maple Leafs, Cheevers deliberately set the record by shooting the puck into the stands in the last minute of play. Cheevers and Gilbert were runners-up for the Vezina Trophy (at the time given out for the fewest number of goals given up by a team), but Don Edwards and Bob Sauvé of the Buffalo Sabres ended up winning the award. In his final games of play, Cheevers played all ten postseason games as the Bruins were eliminated in the second round by the New York Islanders. He retired at the end of that season on July 7, 1980.

Cheevers finished with a career goals against average of 2.89, recorded 230 NHL wins, played in 419 NHL games, and registered 26 NHL shutouts. He is second in the WHA's history in career GAA and shutouts, even though he played during only half the league's existence. Cheevers was inducted into the Hockey Hall of Fame in 1985 and is one of the few goaltenders in the Hall to have never been named to an NHL All-Star Team or won the Vezina Trophy. He was later inducted as an inaugural member into the World Hockey Association Hall of Fame in 2010.

=== Style ===
Cheevers was not afraid to stray from the crease to cut down the shooter's angle or to act as a "third defenseman". He was very aggressive with opposing players who strayed into or near the crease and was not afraid to hit opposing players with his goalie stick if they got too close to the crease. Cheevers was also known to make some spectacular saves throughout his career. Cheevers was also not afraid to handle the puck at his stick once famously skating the puck from his crease all the way to the center ice.

Not a "stand-up" goalie, Cheevers could often be found on his knees or even his side. He perfected this "flopping" style while playing for Rochester during the 1962–63 season. Americans' coach Rudy Migay had Cheevers practice without his stick, thus requiring him to rely more on using his body and his pads.

His former coach Don Cherry has referred to him as "the best ever to play the game." Joe Crozier, Cheevers's coach during his Rochester days, called him “the most exciting goalie you'll ever see. He'll have your fans on the edge of their seat all night.”

Reggie Leach, a teammate of Cheevers in Boston, stated that Cheevers was the hardest goaltender for him to score on:

I did score some goals on him, but he was one of the hardest goaltenders for me to score on. I couldn’t figure him out. When I played, I used to watch the warm-ups all the time and then practice shooting from different spots. Where I was most dangerous was at the top of the circle, and out farther. I wasn’t that great inside, I don’t think. Kenny Dryden: the easiest goaltender for me to score on. Yep. Because Kenny was scared of my shot. And I beat him high all the time, always over the shoulder. When I was in Boston, I remember going to practice as a rookie and as a rookie you just go all-out, you just shoot it, and I go in there and I put one past Cheevers and I thought, Yeah, I beat him. But Gerry, if you hit him with a puck, he’d chase you down the ice. I hit him once in his chest and he chased me with his stick with the guys all laughing. Gerry would stand, no lie. All he did was stand in net, stand there, wave his stick. It was his practice and if you hit him, he’d chase you down the ice.

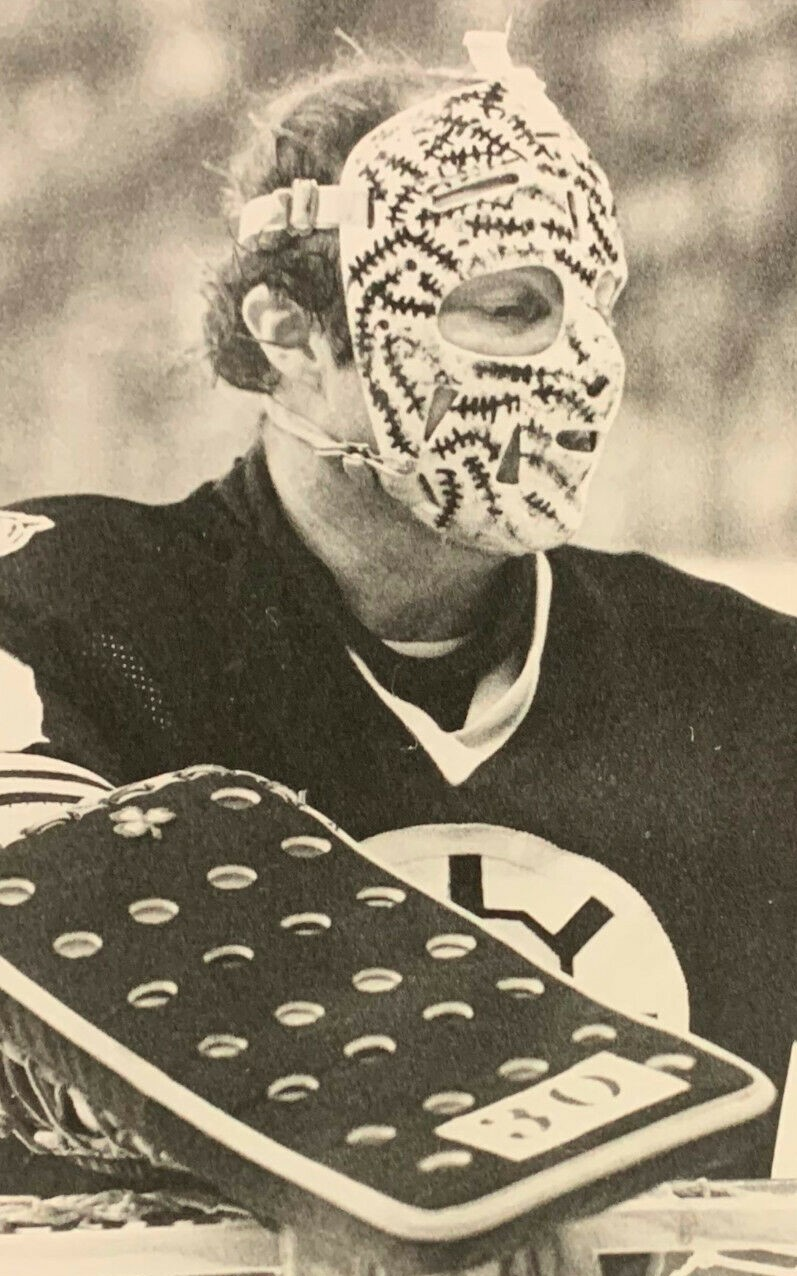
Cheevers wearing his distinctive mask with the Boston Bruins in 1980

=== Mask ===
Cheevers was inspired to create his distinctive stitch pattern mask when a puck hit him in the face during practice. Cheevers, never one to miss an opportunity to skip out of practice, went to the dressing room. Bruins coach Harry Sinden followed him to the dressing room, where he found Cheevers enjoying a beer and smoking a cigarette. Annoyed, Sinden ordered Cheevers, who wasn't injured, to get back on the ice. In jest, John "Frosty" Forristall, the Bruins' assistant trainer, drew a stitch mark on his mask, which amused the team. After that, any time he was similarly struck, he had a new stitch-mark drawn on his mask. Cheevers later claimed that the mask spared him from over 150 medical stitches over his career and was the first to be custom decorated in the sport. The mask became one of the most recognized of the era, and one of the most iconic in NHL history along with helping set the standard of goaltenders adding some personal flair to their masks. The original is now on the wall of his grandson's bedroom.

Years later, goalie Steve Shields paid tribute to Cheevers when he played for the Bruins in 2002 and 2003, sporting a modern airbrushed version of the stitch-covered mask. In 2008, The Hockey News rated his mask the greatest ever by a wide margin. It received 221 of a possible 300 points; Gilles Gratton's mask was rated second with 66.

Cheevers's mask design has appeared in rock-n-roll culture. Black Veil Brides' lead singer Andy Biersack cited it as the reason he got interested in hockey and played goalie when he was younger. In homage to Cheevers, Biersack painted stitches on his face for live shows.

=== Publications ===
In 1971, Cheevers published the book Goaltender, detailing his experiences during the 1970–71 season, through to the unexpected loss in the first round to the underdog Montreal Canadiens. In 2011, alongside author Marc Zappulla, Cheevers cowrote his autobiography titled “Unmasked”.

== Coaching career ==
Cheevers's final season as a player came in 1980 when popular coach Don Cherry was replaced by Fred Creighton. After winning their division in seven of the previous nine seasons, the Bruins were in third place late in the year, and general manager Harry Sinden fired Creighton and took over as coach for the remainder of the season. For the 1980–81 season, Cheevers was named coach. In that year's playoffs, the Bruins suffered a shocking sweep by the Minnesota North Stars, who had never before won a game in Boston Garden. Even so, Sinden stuck with Cheevers, which worked out in his favor as the next season Cheevers led the team to a second-place finish in the division and a playoff appearance. The following season He led the team to the league's best record with 110 points in the 1982–83 season with a 50-20-10 record; in the playoffs, the team fell to the eventual Stanley Cup Champions, the New York Islanders, in the semifinals. The following season in 1983-84, Cheevers led the team to another 100+ point season and a second Adams division title with a 49-25-9 record. However, during the playoffs they lost in the divisional semifinals.

Cheevers was replaced by Sinden in the middle of the 1984–85 season. With a record of 204–126–46, he ranks seventh in career winning percentage (.604) among NHL coaches with more than 250 games experience.

Despite never having a losing record Cheevers was criticized by media for maintaining the same relaxed demeanor he had during his playing days. Cheevers later stated "After that, I decided I never wanted to coach again,” "It's just too tough. You have to be a 24/7 guy, and I just don't think I'm that type."

== Retirement ==
After his departure as Bruins' coach, Cheevers served as a color commentator for the Hartford Whalers from 1986 to 1995 alongside Rick Peckham, on SportsChannel New England and WHCT-TV. He then left his commentary job to then rejoin his former team the Boston Bruins as a member of their scouting staff in 1995. During the 1999–2000 season he also began working as broadcaster for the Bruins for station WSBK-TV. Still in a color commentator role he worked alongside Dave Shea and his former teammate Phil Esposito. From 2000 to 2002 he strictly worked road games alongside Dave Shea, however he stepped down from commentary completely at the end of the 2001–2002 season. Cheevers remained a member of the Bruins scouting staff till 2006.

Cheevers lived in Everett, Massachusetts. He married his wife Elizabeth in 1964. The two had three children together: Craig, Sherril and Rob. Elizabeth died in 2019. Rob was a hockey player himself, playing three seasons as a center for Boston College.

Cheevers was also involved in charitable efforts raising money for the Ace Bailey Children's Fund, named after his former teammate Garnet Bailey. In 2011, after the Bruins won the Stanley Cup, Cheevers brought the Cup to the American Nutrition Center in Everett to help raise money for the Cystic Fibrosis Foundation.

In 2015 Cheevers received the Hockey Legacy Award from The Sports Museum. He now spends time in Boca Raton, Florida where he enjoys playing golf, as well as taking trips to Boston to visit his grandchildren. He is also involved with the Boston Bruins as a part of their Alumni Association.

=== Horse racing ===
Cheevers also devoted time to Thoroughbred racing, during the mid-1970s he started Cheevers G M Stable Inc. His most successful runner was the Grade 1 winner Royal Ski. Who was the country's leading 2-year-old money winner in 1976, finishing ahead of Seattle Slew. Throughout Royal Ski's tenure, he won eight races amassing over $300,000 before being retired and sent to Japan in 1979 to live out the rest of its life. Cheevers frequently made allusions to horse racing during interviews. After playing a particularly good game in the 1972 Stanley Cup playoffs, Cheevers told reporters he "felt like Riva Ridge"—the horse that had recently won the 1972 Kentucky Derby. However, after Royal Ski was sidelined with a virus Cheevers stepped away from the sport, convinced that racing was not his game. He later stated "I don't own horses or watch racing anymore," "I got spoiled with a really good horse, and I got out of it."

=== Popular culture ===
In 1996, Canadian pop-punk band Chixdiggit released their self-titled album on SubPop, and included the song "I Feel Like Gerry Cheevers (Stitchmarks On My Heart)." The lyrics include references to Cheevers's undefeated streak, the stitch marks drawn for every shot that hit his cheek, and his number 30 jersey. The chorus includes the lyrics "he wore a mask just like my heart, it had stitch marks on every part."

== Awards and honors ==
Award	Year(s)
Junior
Dave Pinkney Trophy	1960
Memorial Cup	1961
Minor leagues
Harry "Hap" Holmes Memorial Award	1965
Calder Cup	1965
AHL First Team All-Star	1965
Adams Cup	1966, 1967
NHL
All-Star Game	1969
Stanley Cup champion	1970, 1972
WHA
First All-Star Team	1973
Ben Hatskin Award	1973
All-Star Game	1973, 1974, 1975, 1976
Second All-Star Team	1974, 1975

- Inducted into the Hockey Hall of Fame in 1985
- Inducted into the Rochester Americans Hall of Fame in 1987
- The St. Michael's Majors had a banner in Cheevers honor at their home arena until the team folded in 2012
- Inducted as an inaugural member into the World Hockey Association Hall of Fame in 2010.
- In 2023, he was Named one of the Top 100 Best Bruins Players of all Time.
- In 2023, he was named to the Boston Bruins All-Centennial Team.

== International play ==
- 1974 – Played for Team Canada at the 1974 Summit Series
- 1976 – Spare goaltender for Team Canada in the Canada Cup
- 1979 – Played for NHL All-Stars in the Challenge Cup vs. Team Soviet Union

== Career statistics ==
=== Regular season and playoffs ===
			Regular season									Playoffs
Season	Team	League	GP	W	L	T	MIN	GA	SO	GAA	SV%	GP	W	L	MIN	GA	SO	GAA	SV%
1956–57	St. Michael's Midget Majors	THL	—	—	—	—	—	—	—	—	—	—	—	—	—	—	—	—	—
1956–57	St. Michael's Majors	OHA-Jr.	1	—	—	—	60	4	0	4.00	—	—	—	—	—	—	—	—	—
1957–58	St. Michael's Majors	OHA-Jr.	1	0	0	0	60	3	0	3.00	—	—	—	—	—	—	—	—	—
1958–59	St. Michael's Buzzers	MetJHL	—	—	—	—	—	—	—	—	—	—	—	—	—	—	—	—	—
1958–59	St. Michael's Majors	OHA-Jr.	6	—	—	—	360	28	0	4.67	—	—	—	—	—	—	—	—	—
1959–60	St. Michael's Majors	OHA-Jr.	36	18	13	5	2,160	111	5	3.08	—	10	—	—	600	33	0	3.30	—
1960–61	St. Michael's Majors	OHA-Jr.	30	12	20	5	1,775	94	2	3.18	—	20	—	—	1,200	52	1	2.60	—
1960–61	St. Michael's Majors	MC	—	—	—	—	—	—	—	—	—	9	7	2	540	21	1	2.33	—
1961–62	Sault Thunderbirds	EPHL	29	13	13	3	1,740	103	1	3.55	—	—	—	—	—	—	—	—	—
1961–62	Pittsburgh Hornets	AHL	5	2	2	1	300	21	0	4.20	—	—	—	—	—	—	—	—	—
1961–62	Toronto Maple Leafs	NHL	2	1	1	0	120	6	0	3.00	.905	—	—	—	—	—	—	—	—
1961–62	Rochester Americans	AHL	19	9	9	1	1,140	69	1	3.63	—	2	2	0	120	8	0	4.00	—
1962–63	Rochester Americans	AHL	19	7	9	3	1,140	75	1	3.95	—	—	—	—	—	—	—	—	—
1962–63	Sudbury Wolves	EPHL	51	17	24	10	3,060	212	4	4.15	—	8	4	4	485	29	1	3.59	—
1963–64	Rochester Americans	AHL	66	38	25	2	4,359	195	3	2.84	—	2	0	2	120	8	0	4.00	—
1964–65	Rochester Americans	AHL	72	48	21	3	4,359	195	5	2.68	—	10	8	2	615	24	0	2.34	—
1965–66	Boston Bruins	NHL	7	0	4	1	340	34	0	6.00	.829	—	—	—	—	—	—	—	—
1965–66	Oklahoma City Blazers	CPHL	30	16	9	5	1,760	73	3	2.49	—	9	8	1	540	19	0	2.11	—
1966–67	Boston Bruins	NHL	22	5	10	6	1,284	72	1	3.33	.896	—	—	—	—	—	—	—	—
1966–67	Oklahoma City Blazers	CPHL	26	14	6	5	1,520	71	1	2.80	—	11	8	3	677	29	1	2.57	—
1967–68	Boston Bruins	NHL	47	23	17	5	2,646	125	3	2.83	.907	4	0	4	240	15	0	3.75	.895
1968–69	Boston Bruins	NHL	52	28	12	12	3,112	145	3	2.80	.912	9	6	3	572	16	3	1.68	.947
1969–70	Boston Bruins	NHL	41	24	8	8	2,384	108	4	2.72	.919	13	12	1	781	29	0	2.23	.925
1970–71	Boston Bruins	NHL	40	27	8	5	2,400	109	3	2.73	.918	6	3	3	360	21	0	3.50	.892
1971–72	Boston Bruins	NHL	41	27	5	8	2,420	101	2	2.50	.920	8	6	2	483	21	2	2.61	.915
1972–73	Cleveland Crusaders	WHA	52	32	20	0	3,144	149	5	2.84	.912	9	5	4	548	22	0	2.41	.921
1973–74	Cleveland Crusaders	WHA	59	30	20	6	3,562	180	4	3.03	.906	5	1	4	303	18	0	3.56	.908
1974–75	Cleveland Crusaders	WHA	52	26	24	2	3,076	167	4	3.26	.905	5	1	4	300	23	0	4.60	—
1975–76	Cleveland Crusaders	WHA	28	11	14	1	1,570	95	1	3.63	.886	—	—	—	—	—	—	—	—
1975–76	Boston Bruins	NHL	15	8	2	5	900	41	1	2.73	.902	6	2	4	392	14	1	2.14	.917
1976–77	Boston Bruins	NHL	45	30	10	5	2,700	137	3	3.04	.882	14	8	5	858	44	1	3.08	.865
1977–78	Boston Bruins	NHL	21	10	5	2	1,086	48	1	2.65	.887	12	8	4	731	35	1	2.87	.883
1978–79	Boston Bruins	NHL	43	23	9	10	2,509	132	1	3.16	.865	6	4	2	360	15	0	2.50	.891
1979–80	Boston Bruins	NHL	42	24	11	7	2,479	116	4	2.81	.881	10	4	6	619	32	0	3.10	.875
NHL totals			418	230	102	74	24,394	1,175	26	2.89	.901	88	53	34	5,396	242	8	2.69	.902
WHA totals			191	99	78	9	11,352	591	14	3.12	.905	19	7	12	1,151	63	0	3.28	—

=== International ===
Year	Team	Event	GP	W	L	T	MIN	GA	SO	GAA
1974	Canada	SS	7	1	3	3	420	24	0	3.43

"Gerry Cheevers' stats". The Goaltender Home Page.

== Coaching statistics ==
Team	Year	Regular season						Postseason			
Team	Year	G	W	L	T	Pts	Finish	W	L	Win %	Result
BOS	1980–81	80	37	20	13	87	2nd in Adams	0	3	.000	Lost in preliminary round (MNS)
BOS	1981–82	80	43	27	10	96	2nd in Adams	6	5	.545	Lost in Division Finals (QUE)
BOS	1982–83	80	50	20	10	110	1st in Adams	9	8	.529	Lost in Conference Finals (NYI)
BOS	1983–84	80	49	25	9	104	1st in Adams	0	3	.000	Lost in Division Semifinals (MTL)
BOS	1984–85	56	25	24	7	(57)	(fired)	—	—	—	—
Total		376	204	126	46			15	9	.625	4 playoff appearances

Preceded by Harry Sinden	Head coach of the Boston Bruins; 1980–1985	Succeeded by Harry Sinden
Preceded by Roger Crozier	Harry "Hap" Holmes Memorial Award; 1964–65	Succeeded by Les Binkley
