= Ben Hatskin Trophy =

The Ben Hatskin Trophy was presented annually to the World Hockey Association's best goaltender.

It was named in honour of Ben Hatskin, who founded the Winnipeg Jets. Gerry Cheevers won the very first Hatskin award, which was awarded in August 1973, months after the conclusion of the season.

== List of Trophy winners ==
- 1973 – Gerry Cheevers, Cleveland Crusaders
- 1974 – Don McLeod, Houston Aeros
- 1975 – Ron Grahame, Houston Aeros
- 1976 – Michel Dion, Indianapolis Racers
- 1977 – Ron Grahame, Houston Aeros
- 1978 – Al Smith, New England Whalers
- 1979 – Dave Dryden, Edmonton Oilers
