= 1977 WHA All-Star Game =

Ice hockey game in Connecticut, US

	1	2	3	Total
Western	1	0	1	2
Eastern	2	0	2	4
- Date: January 18, 1977
- Arena: Hartford Civic Center
- City: Hartford, Connecticut
- MVP: Willy Lindstrom & Jean-Louis Levasseur
- Attendance: 10,337

The World Hockey Association All-Star Game was held in the Hartford Civic Center in Hartford, Connecticut on January 18, 1977. The game pitted the Western Division All-Stars against the Eastern Division All-Stars. The Division Most Valuable Player Awards were given to Willy Lindstrom (Western) and Jean-Louis Levasseur (Eastern). Jean-Louis Levasseur had been named an All-Star of the Eastern Division when playing for the Minnesota Fighting Saints before the team announced their folding in January 1977. He was sold to the Edmonton Oilers but the WHA allowed him to play for the Eastern Division.

== Teams ==
=== West ===
Coach: Bobby Kromm (Winnipeg)

Goaltenders: Wayne Rutledge (Houston), Joe Daley (Winnipeg).

Defensemen: Thommie Bergman (Winnipeg), Paul Shmyr, Kevin Morrison (San Diego), Barry Wilkins (Edmonton), Poul Popiel (Houston), Paul Terbenche (Calgary).

Forwards: Bobby Hull, Ulf Nilsson, Anders Hedberg, Willy Lindstrom (Winnipeg), Robbie Ftorek, Del Hall (Phoenix), Cam Connor, Gordie Howe (Houston), Joe Noris, Andre Lacroix, Norm Ferguson (San Diego), Danny Lawson (Calgary).

=== East ===
Coach: Jacques Demers (Indianapolis).

Goaltenders: Louis Levasseur (Minnesota), John Garrett (Birmingham).

Defensemen: Pat Stapleton (Indianapolis), J. C. Tremblay (Quebec), Ron Plumb, John Hughes (Cincinnati), Gordie Roberts, Thommie Abrahamsson (New England).

Forwards: Serge Bernier, Real Cloutier, Marc Tardif (Quebec), Richie Leduc, Dennis Sobchuk (Cincinnati), Michel Parizeau, Hugh Harris, Blair MacDonald (Indianapolis), Mike Rogers, George Lyle, Ralph Backstrom (New England), Mark Napier (Birmingham).
