= Gordie Howe Trophy =

Former North American ice hockey award

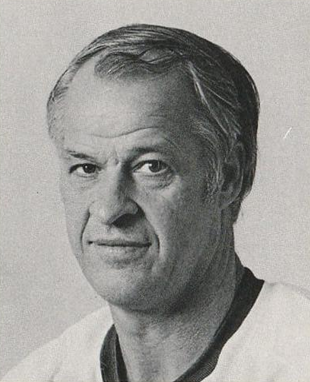
Gordie Howe of the Houston Aeros won the Gary L. Davidson Award in the WHA's second season as the oldest ever MVP in professional hockey at 46 years old. The award was re-named after him in 1975.

The Gordie Howe Trophy was an annual award for the World Hockey Association for the most valuable player in a season. It was first awarded in 1973 under the original name of the award as the Gary L. Davidson Award, named after WHA co-founder Gary Davidson. Prior to the 1975–76 WHA season, the award was re-named after all-time great Gordie Howe. The trophy included a bust of Howe on a multi-level wood base.

The vote was done by media members after the season ended. On June 7, 1973, Bobby Hull was named the first league MVP. He received 199 points from a panel of sports writers and broadcasters in WHA cities and finished ahead of Gerry Cheevers (66 points) and J. C. Tremblay (48 points); notably, Hull won the award after scoring 51 goals in 63 games that saw him miss the first fifteen games of the year due to litigation trying to stop him from playing. The original prize for winning the award was a silver trophy and $4,000. In 1974, Howe won the balloting (135-86) over Mike Walton. In the media vote for 1977, Robbie Ftorek of the Phoenix Roadrunners won the MVP award in the closest finish ever, edging out Anders Hedberg by one vote (168-167), with Réal Cloutier being third at 80 points. Ftorek was the first American to win an MVP award for a professional hockey league and notably did so for a last-place team that dissolved that same year. On May 16, 1979, the final MVP award was given out to Dave Dryden on the Edmonton Oilers, winning the vote by broadcasters and sportswriters with 79 votes to the 69 for Real Cloutier and 48 for Robbie Ftorek (in contrast, a vote by players in April picked Ftorek over Cloutier).

== Winners ==
- 1973 – Bobby Hull, Winnipeg Jets
- 1974 – Gordie Howe, Houston Aeros
- 1975 – Bobby Hull, Winnipeg Jets
- 1976 – Marc Tardif, Quebec Nordiques
- 1977 – Robbie Ftorek, Phoenix Roadrunners
- 1978 – Marc Tardif, Quebec Nordiques
- 1979 – Dave Dryden, Edmonton Oilers

== MVP winners ==
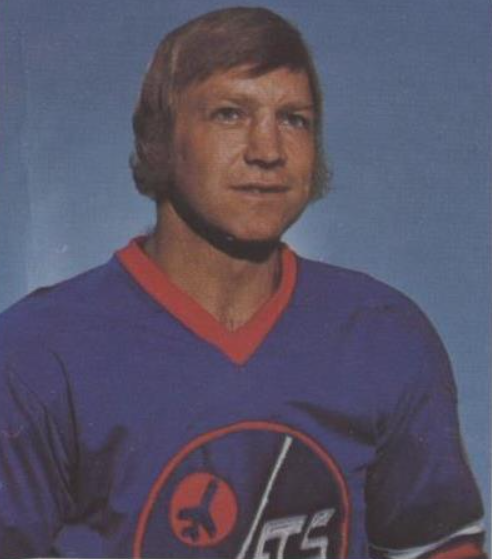
Bobby Hull (1973)

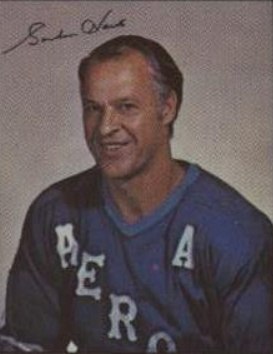
Gordie Howe (1974)

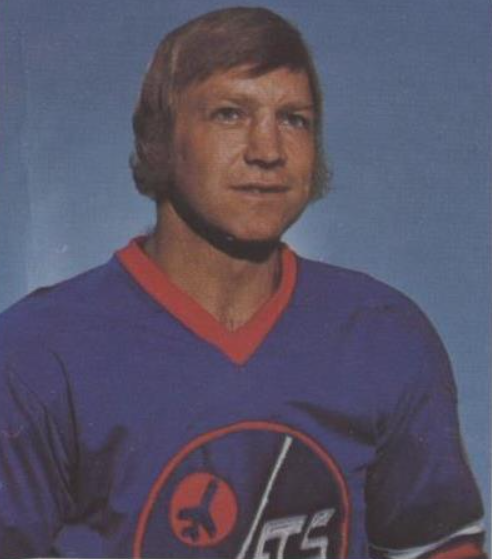
Bobby Hull (1975)

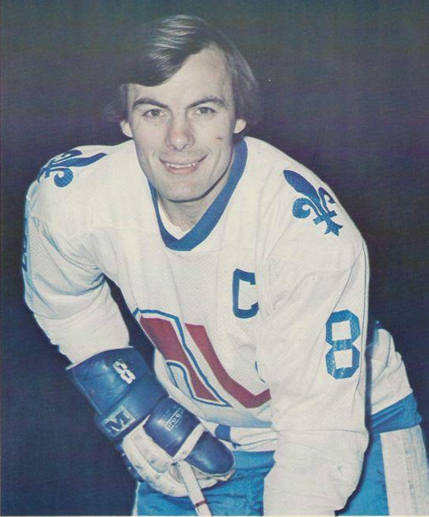
Marc Tardif (1976)

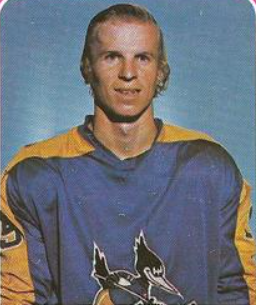
Robbie Ftorek (1977)

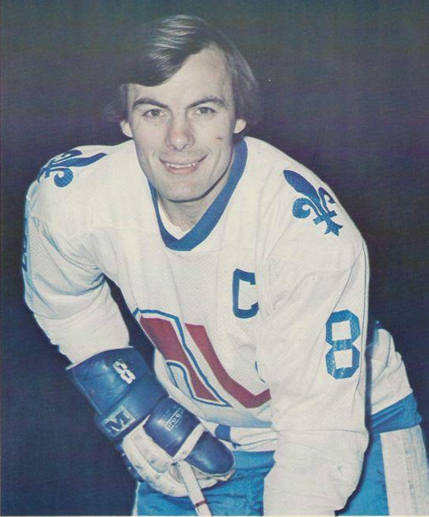
Marc Tardif (1978)

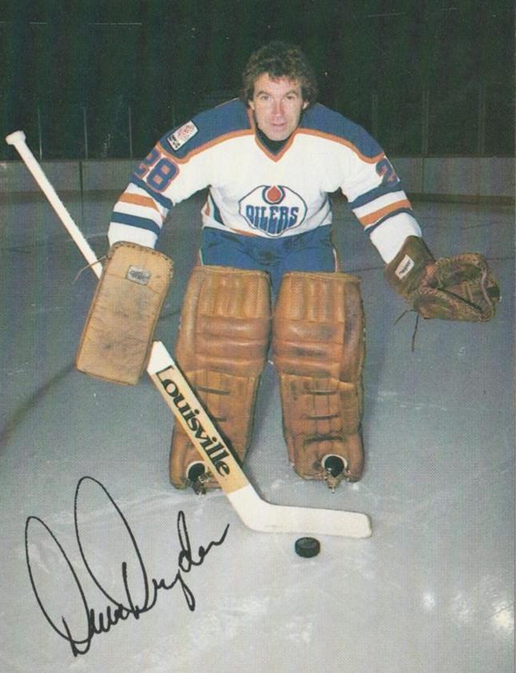
Dave Dryden (1979)

== See also ==
- List of WHA seasons
- World Hockey Association
