= Sleeping Children Around the World =

Charity organization for children

Sleeping Children Around the World (SCAW)
- Company type: Charity
- Founded: 1970
- Founder: Murray and Margaret Dryden
- Headquarters: Toronto, Ontario, Canada
- Revenue: 1,444,887 Canadian dollar (2003)
- Total assets: 3,413,180 Canadian dollar (2003)
- Number of employees: 1 (2004, 2005, 2006, 2007, 2008, 2009, 2010, 2011, 2012, 2013, 2014, 2015, 2016, 2017, 2018, 2019, 2020, 2021, 2022, 2023, 2024)
- Website: Sleeping Children Around the World

Sleeping Children Around the World (SCAW) is a charitable organization, founded in 1970 by Murray and Margaret Dryden, headquartered in Toronto, Ontario, Canada, providing bedkits to children in developing countries. In return for each $35 CAD donation, SCAW provides a child with a kit consisting of a mat or mattress, pillow, bed sheet, blanket, mosquito net (if required), clothes outfit, towel and school supplies. The kits are created in the country where they are to be distributed. This helps reduce transportation and material costs as well as providing an economic benefit to the targeted area. The organization reports that since 1970, bed kits have been provided to over 1.4 million children.

All charitable contributions go directly to purchasing the bedkits. The expenses connected to the volunteers who distribute the bedkits are paid by each volunteer. Administrative costs including the sole paid employee are paid from a legacy fund set up by Murray Dryden specifically to defray the costs of administration and to ensure that all money donated goes towards purchasing the bed kits. There is no promotional budget as advertising is only by word of mouth.
