= World Hockey Association =

1972–1979 North American ice hockey league

- Sport: Ice hockey
- Founded: September 13, 1971; 55 years ago
- Folded: June 22, 1979; 47 years ago
- Countries: United States; Canada
- Last champion: Winnipeg Jets (3)
- Most titles: Winnipeg Jets (3)

The World Hockey Association (French: Association mondiale de hockey) was a professional ice hockey major league that operated in North America from 1972 to 1979. It was the first major league to compete with the National Hockey League (NHL) since the collapse of the Western Hockey League in 1926. Although the WHA was not the first league since that time to attempt to challenge the NHL's supremacy, it was by far the most successful in the modern era.

The WHA tried to capitalize on the lack of hockey teams in a number of major American cities and mid-level Canadian cities, and also hoped to attract the best players by paying more than NHL owners would. The WHA successfully challenged the NHL's reserve clause, which had bound players to their NHL teams even without a valid contract, allowing players in both leagues greater freedom of movement. Sixty-seven players jumped from the NHL to the WHA in the first year, led by star forward Bobby Hull, whose ten-year, $2.75 million contract was a record at the time. The league took advantage of drafting young players, as the NHL amateur draft at the time stipulated players had to be at least 20 years old to be drafted (in 1974, the NHL moved the age to 18 to compete with the WHA for that year only). The WHA took the initiative to sign European players, most famously with Vaclav Nedomansky, the first Czechoslovak to defect to North America to play hockey, in 1974; the initiative to sign European players ushered in a new era in North American hockey. Other noted names to enter the WHA in later years included Gordie Howe, who elected to return to hockey at age 45 with the Houston Aeros in 1973 to play with his sons Mark and Marty. In the seven seasons of giving out the Avco World Trophy, one of (or both) the Winnipeg Jets and Houston Aeros made the Final in each year, with Houston winning twice and Winnipeg winning three times.

The WHA was chronically unstable, with franchises occasionally relocating or folding in the middle of the season. It had an acrimonious relationship with the NHL, resulting in numerous legal battles, as well as competition for control of players and markets. In spite of this, merger talks began almost immediately. NHL owners voted down a 1977 plan to merge six WHA teams (the Edmonton Oilers, New England Whalers, Quebec Nordiques, Cincinnati Stingers, Houston Aeros, and Winnipeg Jets) into the NHL before a 1979 merger was approved. The final WHA game was played on May 20, 1979, as the Jets defeated the Oilers to win their third Avco World Trophy.

As a result, the WHA ceased operations, and four teams joined the NHL for the 1979–80 season: the Edmonton Oilers, New England (renamed Hartford) Whalers, Quebec Nordiques, and Winnipeg Jets. Of these four teams, the Oilers are the only one that did not move. In the 1990's the Nordiques moved to Denver, the Jets moved to Phoenix and the Whalers moved from Hartford to Raleigh, North Carolina, and were renamed the Carolina Hurricanes. The Jets returned to Winnipeg in 2011.

== History ==
=== Founding ===
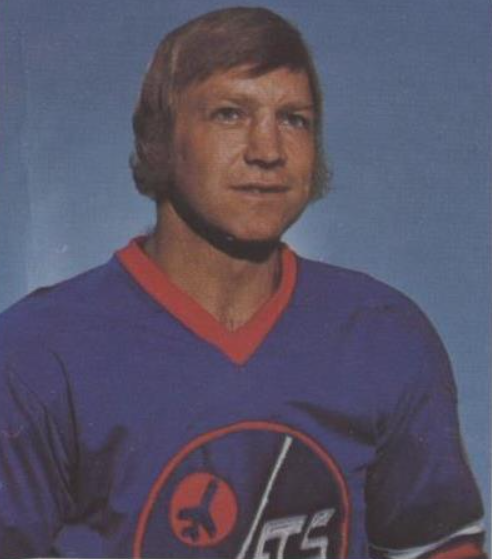
Bobby Hull (pictured in 1975) was among the biggest names to jump from the National Hockey League to the WHA in its first year.

The World Hockey Association was founded in 1971 by American promoters Dennis Murphy and Gary Davidson. The men had previously been the founder and first president of the American Basketball Association, respectively. They quickly recruited Bill Hunter, president of the junior Western Canada Hockey League. Hunter and Murphy traveled across North America recruiting franchise owners, and by September 1971, had announced that the league would begin in 1972 with ten teams, each having paid $25,000 for their franchise.

The average NHL salary in 1972 was $25,000, the lowest of the four major sports, while each player was bound by a reserve clause, that automatically extended their contract by one year when it expired, tying them to their team for the life of their career. In October 1972, the WHA announced that it would not use the reserve clause, stating that "The reserve clause won't stand up to the scrutiny of ... players, players associations, the United States Congress, the public, and the Supreme Court." The WHA also promised much higher salaries than the NHL offered, and by the time the league began play, it had lured 67 former NHL players to its league, including Bernie Parent, Gerry Cheevers, Derek Sanderson, J. C. Tremblay, and Ted Green. The biggest name signed was former Chicago Black Hawks star Bobby Hull, who agreed to a ten-year, $2.7 million contract with the Winnipeg Jets, the largest in hockey history at the time, and one that lent the league instant credibility.

The NHL tried to block several of the defections. The Boston Bruins attempted to restrain Sanderson and Cheevers from joining the WHA, though a United States federal court refused to prohibit the signings. The Black Hawks were successful in having a restraining order filed against Hull and the Jets pending the outcome of legal action the Black Hawks were taking against the WHA. The new league was eager for the court action, intending to challenge the legality of the reserve clause.

In November 1972, Judge A. Leon Higginbotham Jr. of the U.S. District Court in Philadelphia placed an injunction against the NHL, preventing it from enforcing the reserve clause and freeing all players who had restraining orders against them, including Hull, to play with their WHA clubs. The decision effectively ended the NHL's monopoly on major league professional hockey talent.

=== Teams ===
On November 1, 1971, twelve teams were formally announced. They included cities without NHL teams such as the Miami Screaming Eagles, as well as teams in cities where the league's promoters believed there was room for more than one team, such as the Los Angeles Aces, Chicago Cougars, and New York Raiders. Two of the original twelve teams moved before the first season started: the Dayton Arrows became the Houston Aeros and the San Francisco Sharks became the Quebec Nordiques. The Los Angeles franchise then took the nickname Sharks to replace Aces. The Calgary Broncos and the Screaming Eagles folded outright, replaced by the Philadelphia Blazers and the Cleveland Crusaders.

Although the league had many players under contract by June 1972, including a few NHL stars such as Bernie Parent, many of them were career minor league and college players. The new league was not considered much of a threat, until Bobby Hull, arguably the NHL's top forward at the time, jumped over. Hull had not been thought to be seriously considering signing with the WHA, even though he was in contentious salary negotiations with the Chicago Black Hawks, and when he told reporters that he would only move to the WHA "for a million dollars", it was both intended by Hull and taken by his audience to be a joke since a million dollars at that time was considered to be a ridiculous amount of money for a hockey player. Nevertheless, the Winnipeg Jets offered Hull a five-year, one million dollar contract with a one million dollar signing bonus. Hull accepted the Jets' offer, sealing the deal in an elaborate signing ceremony at Portage and Main. Hull's move to the upstart league attracted a few other top stars such as Cheevers, Sanderson, and Tremblay.

The WHA officially made its debut on October 11, 1972, at the Ottawa Civic Centre, when the Alberta Oilers defeated the Ottawa Nationals 7–4 while the Cleveland Crusaders defeated the Quebec Nordiques 2–0 at Cleveland Arena. Oilers player Ron Anderson scored the first goal in WHA history at 6:19 of the opening period in front of 5,065 fans that was broadcast live on CBC. Although the quality of hockey in the early years was predictably below that of the NHL, the WHA had indeed made stars out of many players that had little or no playing time in the NHL. For a very brief time in the leadup to the first season, the league tried orange pucks (an idea floated around in varying degrees by the NHL for years); notably, the first intended game for the Blazers against the New England Whalers on October 13 saw the game called off due to insufficient quality of ice that led to Philadelphia fans throwing their promotional giveaway red hockey pucks onto the ice. However, the dye apparently affected the quality of the pucks that became potato-shaped when hit during play; the result was they later changed the color of the pucks to dark blue.

The New England Whalers, the best team in the league for the first season, eventually won the WHA's inaugural championship, later renamed the Avco World Trophy when the Avco Financial Services Corporation became its main sponsor. However, the trophy had not yet been completed, and the Whalers skated their divisional championship trophy around the ice surface, much to the embarrassment of the WHA office. As it turned out, the best team in the league for a season for points would win the playoffs in five of the seven WHA playoffs (with 1977 and 1979 being the lone exceptions); four of the seven Avco Cup Finals were decided by the two best teams in the regular season (1974, 1977, 1979 being the exceptions). No Avco Cup Finals game played reached overtime.

=== Problems ===
Alternate WHA logo

Right from the start, the league was plagued with problems. Many teams often found themselves in financial difficulty, folding or moving from one city to another, sometimes mid-season. Citing arena troubles, two of the original twelve teams, the Dayton Arrows and the San Francisco Sharks, relocated before the first season began, becoming the Houston Aeros and Quebec Nordiques, respectively. The Calgary Broncos and the Miami Screaming Eagles, folded outright before the first puck dropped, being replaced by the Philadelphia Blazers and the Cleveland Crusaders.

The New York Raiders, initially intended to be the WHA's flagship team, suffered from numerous problems. While they planned to play in the brand new Nassau Veterans Memorial Coliseum, Nassau County did not consider the WHA a major league and wanted nothing to do with the Raiders. The county recruited William Shea, leader of New York City's successful lobbying campaign to get baseball's National League to expand following the 1957 departures of the Brooklyn Dodgers and New York Giants. Working with the NHL, Shea swiftly won over the initially reluctant president of the New York Rangers, Bill Jennings, who was persuaded that it would be better to accept competition from an NHL team that would at least be willing to pay his club compensation for sharing the Rangers' territory as opposed to a WHA team that would owe his franchise nothing. The NHL quickly awarded a franchise to Long Island, the New York Islanders, who locked up the Coliseum for their own use from 1972 onwards. The Raiders were first forced to rent space at Madison Square Garden, where they were tenants to the Rangers. The situation rapidly became untenable, with an onerous lease and poor attendance, so the three original owners defaulted and the league ended up taking control of the team midway through the season. The Raiders were sold after their inaugural season. They were renamed the New York Golden Blades for the 1973–74 season, but were forced into a Sundays-only home schedule due to the high price of rent and scheduling conflicts with other events at Madison Square Garden. This was not enough to save the team, and the league was forced to take over the franchise again 24 games into the second season. Realizing that it could not hope to compete with both the Rangers and the Islanders, the WHA moved the Golden Blades to New Jersey soon after taking control. Renamed the Jersey Knights, they played at the Cherry Hill Arena which had a slope in the ice surface, causing pucks to shoot upward from results of a pass or shot, chain link fencing instead of Plexiglas surrounding the rink, and inadequate, cramped changing and dressing facilities.

Teams routinely changed coaches: of the twelve coaches hired for 1972, just two were retained by 1974 (Bill Dineen and Billy Harris) 56 head coaches were hired by WHA teams in seven seasons, and eleven of them lasted longer than two years: Bill Dineen, Harry Neale, Jacques Demers, Terry Slater, Joe Crozier, Ron Ingram, Billy Harris, Pat Stapleton, Glen Sather, Glen Sonmor, and Bobby Hull.

Ahead of the 1973–74 season, Toronto Maple Leafs owner Harold Ballard deliberately made the Toronto Toros' lease terms at Maple Leaf Gardens as difficult as possible after they moved from Ottawa. The Toros were owned by John F. Bassett, son of Canadian media mogul John Bassett. The older Bassett had formerly been part-owner of the Leafs with Ballard and Stafford Smythe before falling out with his two partners. At the time of the Toros' lease at Maple Leaf Gardens, Ballard was serving a lengthy prison term for fraud and tax evasion and was unable to intervene; but by the time the Toros played their first game, Ballard had been paroled and had regained control of the Gardens. Much to Bassett's outrage, the arena was dim for the first game. Ballard also ordered the cushions from the home bench removed for Toros' games (he told an arena worker, "Let 'em buy their own cushions!"). It was obvious that Ballard was angered at the WHA being figuratively in his backyard, and took out his frustration with the renegade league on the Toros. These terms compelled Bassett to move the team to Birmingham after three seasons.

The league bottomed out in 1975–76 with its third expansion team, the Denver Spurs. A mainstay of the minor Western Hockey League, they were originally supposed to join the NHL in the same way the Vancouver Canucks and California Golden Seals had in the preceding decade. When the NHL reneged on the agreement, and Spurs owner Ivan Mullenix was unable to negotiate an early entry into the NHL, he accepted an offer to join the WHA for the 1975–76 season. However, Denver residents felt betrayed after three years of hype for an NHL team. They did not consider the WHA a major league, and stayed away from Spurs games.

However, halfway through the season, the NHL's Kansas City Scouts began serious talks about moving to Denver. Knowing he could not even begin to compete with an NHL team, Mullenix began talks with a group of Ottawa businessmen who insisted the Spurs move immediately as a condition of further talks. As a result, the Spurs abruptly moved to become the Ottawa Civics while on a road trip. After only seven games as the Civics, the franchise folded when it became clear that the Ottawa group did not have nearly enough financing to buy the team. The Spurs/Civics franchise only played 41 games total, making them easily the shortest-lived franchise in WHA history. The NHL soon fulfilled its promise to Denver by moving the Scouts there to become the Colorado Rockies in the 1976 offseason.

Part of the financial trouble was attributed to the high player salaries. For instance, the Philadelphia Blazers signed Derek Sanderson for $2.6 million, which surpassed that of Brazilian soccer star, Pele, making him the highest-paid athlete in the world at the time. Unfortunately, his play did not live up to the expectations of his salary, and between an early-season injury, intemperate remarks to the press, and Blazer financial troubles, Sanderson's contract was bought out before the end of the season.

As well, big stars lacked supporting players and the quality of the on-ice product suffered.

=== Competing for talent ===
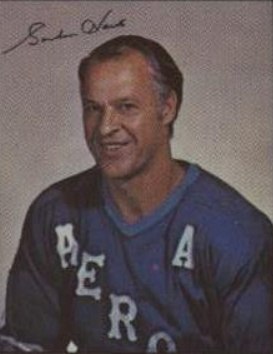
Gordie Howe joined the WHA in 1974 to play with his sons Mark and Marty in the first ever father-and-son group to play together.

The WHA won several key victories, including a court ruling that prevented the NHL from binding players to its teams via the reserve clause, and the signings of more NHL stars such as Gordie Howe, Andre Lacroix, Marc Tardif, and in later years, Frank Mahovlich and Paul Henderson. Howe had been lured out of a two-year retirement for the chance to play alongside his sons, Mark and Marty, who opted to turn pro a year ahead of their NHL draft eligibility. Howe made his first appearance as a WHA player on September 25, 1973 when the league held a "Hockey Spectacular" exhibition event at Madison Square Garden that saw him play with his sons for the Aeros in a round-robin contest with the Winnipeg Jets, the New England Whalers, and the New York Golden Blades. In an event that included gimmicks such as an appearance from a Penthouse model and a costumed Snoopy on skates, roughly over 7,000 fans attended the event.

In the 1974–75 season, to broaden a depleted talent pool, the WHA began signing European players, which the NHL had largely ignored up to that time, in serious numbers, including stars such as Swedish Anders Hedberg and Ulf Nilsson and Czech center Vaclav Nedomansky, who had just defected from Czechoslovakia. Winnipeg especially loaded up with Scandinavian players and became the class of the league, with Hedberg and Nilsson combining with Bobby Hull to form one of hockey's most formidable forward lines. Along with the mass import of European stars, Vancouver attempted unsuccessfully to lure Phil Esposito away from the NHL by offering a contract similar to that of Bobby Hull, with a million dollars upfront.

=== International play ===
The 1972 Summit Series, which pitted Team Canada against the Soviets, did not permit WHA players, due to the decision of series organizer Alan Eagleson, an NHL agent who was influential in forming the Canadian team. Bobby Hull, one of the best WHA players, was ruled ineligible to play because of his defection from the NHL, despite being initially selected by coach Harry Sinden. Dennis Hull initially planned to boycott the event as well as a show of support for his older brother, but Bobby persuaded him to stay on Team Canada. Other WHA stars turned down included Gerry Cheevers, J.C. Tremblay and Derek Sanderson. Some NHL owners also threatened not to free their players to participate if WHA players were permitted.

The WHA organized the 1974 Summit Series against the Soviets, giving an opportunity for Hull and 46-year-old Gordie Howe to play for Canada against the Soviet team, which the Soviets won 4–1–3.

In the 1976 Canada Cup, the NHL and NHLPA broadened the scope of the competition, inviting to the tournament a number of hockey countries and allowing each invited country to send the best possible team they could muster, so this time WHA players were permitted. WHA players played on four of the tournament's six teams.

In December 1976 and January 1977, the Super Series '76-77 tournament took place, opposing the HC CSKA Moscow (Red Army) and WHA teams. The Red Army won the series 6–2.

=== Decline and merger ===
According to Howard Baldwin, as early as the end of the 1972-73 WHA season, there were rumblings of a possible merger, with a secret meeting being held between WHA and NHL people such as Ed Snider. The WHA offered to bring their twelve teams to the NHL for $2 million a team. However, the staunch old guard, as represented by Chicago Blackhawks owner Bill Wirtz rejected the overtures.

By the 1976–77 season, it had become evident that many of the WHA's franchises were teetering on the verge of financial collapse, and that the (at one time) combined 32 teams of the NHL and WHA had badly strained professional hockey's talent pool.

In 1977, merger discussions with the National Hockey League were first initiated, with Houston, Cincinnati, Winnipeg, New England, Quebec, and Edmonton applying for entry to the NHL, who voted the proposal down. Merger discussions resumed in 1978, but Houston was not part of the proposal this time. During the final series of talks, Aeros owner Kenneth Schnitzer suggested to the NHL that either his team be admitted as an expansion team independent of a merger, or he would attempt to purchase an existing club and relocate it to Houston. Neither came to fruition, and as a result the Aeros elected to fold on July 6, 1978. Another proposal had the Edmonton Oilers and the New England Whalers moving to the NHL, with the Winnipeg Jets following a year later, but this was also not accepted by the NHL.

The final two seasons of the WHA saw the debut of many superstars, some of whom became hockey legends in the NHL, including Wayne Gretzky, Mark Messier, Mike Liut, and Mike Gartner. The Birmingham Bulls alone featured future NHLers Rick Vaive, Michel Goulet, Rob Ramage, Ken Linseman, Craig Hartsburg, Rod Langway, Mark Napier, Pat Riggin and Gaston Gingras.

By the end of the final season, only six teams remained. Facing financial difficulty and unable to meet payrolls, the WHA finally came to an agreement with the NHL in early 1979. Under the deal, four WHA clubs – the Edmonton Oilers, New England Whalers (renamed the Hartford Whalers), Quebec Nordiques and Winnipeg Jets – joined the NHL. The other two WHA teams, the Cincinnati Stingers and Birmingham Bulls, were paid $1.5 million apiece in compensation. The NHL treated the new clubs' arrival as an expansion, not a merger, and refused to recognize any WHA records. While the four new clubs were allowed to stock their rosters through the expansion draft, NHL teams were allowed to reclaim players who had jumped to the WHA.

The WHA was able to extract three key concessions. First, the WHA teams were allowed to protect two goaltenders and two skaters to keep their rosters from being completely stripped clean by the NHL teams. Second, the NHL allowed all of the WHA's Canadian teams to be part of the deal. The NHL had originally been willing to take only the Oilers, Whalers, and Jets, but the WHA insisted that the Nordiques be included as well. Third, although the NHL had insisted on treating the deal as an expansion, it agreed to freeze the expansion fee for each team at $6 million U.S., the same fee paid by every other team that had joined the NHL in the 1970s. By comparison, when the Atlanta Flames were sold and moved to Calgary one year later, the sale was $16 million U.S.

The deal came up for a vote at the NHL Board of Governors meeting in Key Largo, Florida on March 8, 1979. The final tally was 12–5, one vote short of passage, as a three-quarters majority was required to permit a merger. The Boston Bruins, Los Angeles Kings, Montreal Canadiens, Toronto Maple Leafs and Vancouver Canucks voted against the deal. The Bruins were not pleased with having to share New England with the Whalers. Los Angeles and Vancouver feared losing home dates with NHL teams from the East. Montreal and Toronto were not enamored at the prospect of having to split revenue from Hockey Night in Canada broadcasts six ways rather than three.

When a second vote was held in Chicago on March 22, 1979, Montreal and Vancouver changed their votes, allowing the deal to go forward. Vancouver and Los Angeles were won over by the promise of a balanced schedule, with each team playing the others twice at home and twice on the road. The Canadiens' owners, Molson Breweries, were feeling the effects of a massive boycott that originated in Edmonton, Quebec City, and Winnipeg and spread across Canada. With the boycott severely hurting Molson's sales, the brewer reached agreement with the owners of the three Canadian WHA teams to have Molson replace their competitors (and Nordiques owners) Carling O'Keefe as the exclusive beer supplier for the Oilers' and Jets' arenas; it is probable that this concession was made in exchange for the Canadiens' vote.

The agreement officially took effect on June 22, 1979 (three months to the day after the deciding vote). On that day, the WHA folded and the NHL formally granted expansion franchises to Edmonton, Hartford, Quebec City, and Winnipeg.

== Legacy of the WHA ==
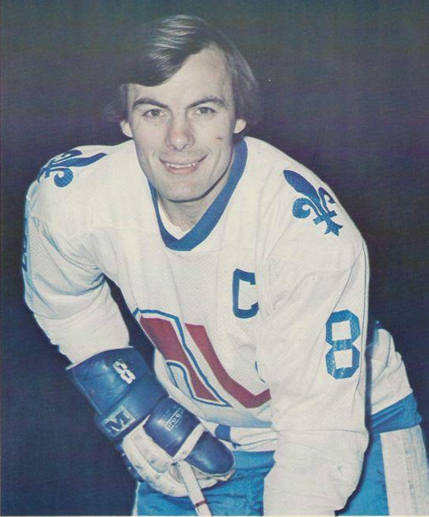
Marc Tardif left the Montreal Canadiens in 1973 to sign with the Los Angeles Sharks for what he desired most: a long-term, no-trade, no-cut contract. In his WHA career, mostly spent with the Quebec Nordiques, he scored 316 goals, the most in league history, and won the Gordie Howe Trophy twice as most valuable player.

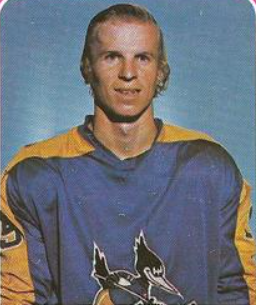
Robbie Ftorek won the Gordie Howe Trophy in the 1976-77 season to become the first American player to win the most valuable player award in pro hockey and the only one until 2016.

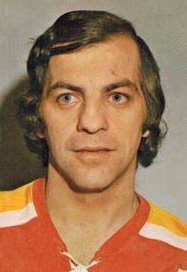
Andre Lacroix left the NHL for greener pastures with the Philadelphia Blazers in 1972. Playing for five teams in seven WHA seasons, he recorded a WHA record 798 points in 551 games, which included six consecutive 100-point seasons.

On the ice, the WHA teams had proven themselves to be the NHL's competitive equals, winning more games than they lost in interleague exhibition games.

The WHA had many lasting effects on NHL hockey. The NHL used to recruit virtually all its players from Canada, but following the success of the Jets' Hedberg and Nilsson, scouts began looking overseas for the best players that Europe could offer. Teams such as the Whalers and Fighting Saints offered excellent opportunities for young American players, and several U.S.-born or -raised NHL stars of the early 1980s (such as Mark Howe, Rod Langway, Dave Langevin, Robbie Ftorek, and Paul Holmgren) had begun their pro careers in the WHA. As a result, the NHL evolved into a truly cosmopolitan league during the 1980s. Looking back on the league a decades later, Howard Baldwin called the WHA "a successful failure."

The WHA ended the NHL policy of paying its players only a fraction of the league's profits and, combined with the abolition of the reserve clause, led to much higher player salaries. Many great stars began their careers in the WHA, including Mark Howe, Wayne Gretzky, Mike Gartner, Mike Liut, and Mark Messier. Gartner <reflected on his one season with the league in 2019, stating, “It was an unbelievable experience. It was a great stepping stone. The top players were just as good as the NHL, but there was not as much depth as the NHL.” Messier was the last WHA veteran to play in the NHL; he opened his professional career with 52 games with the Indianapolis Racers and Cincinnati Stingers in 1978–79, and played his last NHL game on April 3, 2004. The final active player and official in any on-ice capacity for the league was referee Don Koharski, who started as a linesman for the WHA and retired at the end of the 2008–09 NHL season. Various players noted their appreciation of the league such as Rick Ley, who stated, “The league was knocked around by people, but remember the NHL, five-to-seven years after the merger, saw that half of the top ten scorers in the NHL were former WHA players. We helped make the first real changes in wages for pro hockey players and the players today, who were not even born then, have no idea how much the economics of the game today can trace their roots right back to the WHA.”

The WHA instituted sudden death overtime for regular season games to break ties. If no team scored during a 10-minute overtime period, the game ended in a tie. In the 1983–84 season, the NHL then instituted a 5-minute sudden death overtime period to break regular season ties.

The WHA had experimented with blue-colored pucks, which were supposedly easier for fans to see. The NHL did not adopt the blue pucks, but any remaining blue WHA pucks are highly sought after collector's items. Statistics of the league were dutifully collected by Frank Polnaszek, who served as statistician for all seven seasons and also worked for the Whalers for nearly all of their years in the NHL.

=== Fate of surviving teams ===
The former WHA clubs, by the terms of the expansion, could protect only two goalies and two skaters each in the player dispersal draft. The Jets posted a dismal nine wins in their second season (second-fewest all-time for a season in the NHL), and finished last. The other WHA teams did respectably well in their first year, with the Whalers and Oilers earning playoff berths. The Oilers chose to protect Wayne Gretzky in the dispersal draft, which would prove fortuitous. Gretzky and the Whalers' Gordie Howe were selected to the mid-season All-Star Game, respectively the second-youngest and the oldest ever to play in the match.

The 1980s was a successful period for the former WHA teams. The Oilers shattered numerous NHL records and amassed a Stanley Cup dynasty, winning five Cups in its first eleven seasons. The Jets of the 1980s, decimated by the dispersal draft, developed a solid nucleus of players that helped the club achieve respectable regular-season finishes. After missing the playoffs in their first NHL season, the Nordiques quickly became competitive, advancing as far as the third round of the playoffs in their third season. Quebec developed an intense rivalry with the Montreal Canadiens. The Whalers had similar rivalries with the Boston Bruins and New York Rangers, and skated to the 1986–87 Adams Division title.

In the 1990s, the former WHA clubs suffered from escalating player salaries (ironically, the same trend that was instigated by the WHA). The ex-WHA clubs based in Canada were also hit hard by the declining value of the Canadian dollar. The Nordiques moved to Denver in 1995 and became the Colorado Avalanche, where they have won the Stanley Cup three times (1996, 2001, 2022), the Winnipeg Jets were deactivated in 1996, with their assets being transferred to the expansion Phoenix Coyotes, (before returning in 1999 as the Atlanta Thrashers and ultimately relocating back to Winnipeg in 2011) and the Hartford Whalers moved to Raleigh in 1997 and became the Carolina Hurricanes, where they won the Stanley Cup in 2006 and 2026. To date, the Oilers and Jets remain as the only ex-WHA teams still in their original cities. The Oilers, however, remain the only ex-WHA team to have continuously operated in the same city (though they themselves nearly moved to Houston in 1998), where they have won the Stanley Cup five times. Only the Jets have never won the Cup.

== Trophies and awards ==
This is a list of the trophies and awards that were handed out annually by the World Hockey Association.

- Avco World Trophy – Awarded to the playoff champion
- Gary L. Davidson Award / Gordie Howe Trophy – Most valuable player of the regular season
- Bill Hunter Trophy – Leading scorer of the regular season
- Lou Kaplan Trophy – Rookie of the year
- Ben Hatskin Trophy – Best goaltender
- Dennis A. Murphy Trophy – Best defenseman
- Paul Deneau Trophy – Most gentlemanly player
- Howard Baldwin Trophy / Robert Schmertz Memorial Trophy – Coach of the year
- WHA Playoff MVP – Most valuable player in the playoffs

== Teams ==
Three Canadian teams completed all seven WHA seasons based in the same city, and were the same three Canadian teams that ultimately joined the NHL. The other WHA team to enter the NHL, the Whalers, were the only other WHA team to play all of its home games over seven seasons within a relatively small geographical area, having moved 100 miles (160 km) from Boston to Hartford. Of the original 12 WHA franchises, only the Winnipeg Jets remained for all seven seasons without relocating, changing team names, or folding.

Franchise	Cities/Names	Years	Fate
Alberta/Edmonton Oilers	Alberta Oilers	1972–1973	Joined NHL, 1979, as Edmonton Oilers
Alberta/Edmonton Oilers	Edmonton Oilers	1973–1979	Joined NHL, 1979, as Edmonton Oilers
Chicago Cougars	Chicago Cougars	1972–1975	Folded, 1975
Cincinnati Stingers	Cincinnati Stingers	1975–1979	Joined Central Hockey League, 1979–80
Calgary Broncos, Cleveland Crusaders, Minnesota Fighting Saints	Calgary Broncos (never played)	1972	Folded, 1977
Calgary Broncos, Cleveland Crusaders, Minnesota Fighting Saints	Cleveland Crusaders	1972–1976	Folded, 1977
Calgary Broncos, Cleveland Crusaders, Minnesota Fighting Saints	Minnesota Fighting Saints	1976–1977	Folded, 1977
Denver Spurs, Ottawa Civics	Denver Spurs	1975–1976	Folded, 1976
Denver Spurs, Ottawa Civics	Ottawa Civics	1976	Folded, 1976
Dayton Arrows, Houston Aeros	Dayton Arrows (never played)	1972	Folded, 1978
Dayton Arrows, Houston Aeros	Houston Aeros	1972–1978	Folded, 1978
Indianapolis Racers	Indianapolis Racers	1974–1978	Folded, 1978
Los Angeles Aces, Los Angeles Sharks, Michigan Stags, Baltimore Blades	Los Angeles Aces (name changed after San Francisco moved)	1972	Folded, 1975
Los Angeles Aces, Los Angeles Sharks, Michigan Stags, Baltimore Blades	Los Angeles Sharks	1972–1974	Folded, 1975
Los Angeles Aces, Los Angeles Sharks, Michigan Stags, Baltimore Blades	Michigan Stags	1974–1975	Folded, 1975
Los Angeles Aces, Los Angeles Sharks, Michigan Stags, Baltimore Blades	Baltimore Blades	1975	Folded, 1975
Minnesota Fighting Saints	Minnesota Fighting Saints	1972–1976	Folded, 1976
New England Whalers	New England Whalers	1972–1979	Joined NHL, 1979, as Hartford Whalers (now Carolina Hurricanes)
New York Raiders/Golden Blades, Jersey Knights, San Diego Mariners	New York Raiders	1972–1973	Folded, 1977
New York Raiders/Golden Blades, Jersey Knights, San Diego Mariners	New York Golden Blades	1973	Folded, 1977
New York Raiders/Golden Blades, Jersey Knights, San Diego Mariners	Jersey Knights	1973–1974	Folded, 1977
New York Raiders/Golden Blades, Jersey Knights, San Diego Mariners	San Diego Mariners	1974–1977	Folded, 1977
Ottawa Nationals, Toronto Toros, Birmingham Bulls	Ottawa Nationals	1972–1973	Joined Central Hockey League for 1979–80 season
Ottawa Nationals, Toronto Toros, Birmingham Bulls	Toronto Toros	1973–1976	Joined Central Hockey League for 1979–80 season
Ottawa Nationals, Toronto Toros, Birmingham Bulls	Birmingham Bulls	1976–1979	Joined Central Hockey League for 1979–80 season
Miami Screaming Eagles, Philadelphia Blazers, Vancouver Blazers, Calgary Cowboys	Miami Screaming Eagles (never played)	1972	Folded, 1977
Miami Screaming Eagles, Philadelphia Blazers, Vancouver Blazers, Calgary Cowboys	Philadelphia Blazers	1972–1973	Folded, 1977
Miami Screaming Eagles, Philadelphia Blazers, Vancouver Blazers, Calgary Cowboys	Vancouver Blazers	1973–1975	Folded, 1977
Miami Screaming Eagles, Philadelphia Blazers, Vancouver Blazers, Calgary Cowboys	Calgary Cowboys	1975–1977	Folded, 1977
Phoenix Roadrunners	Phoenix Roadrunners	1974–1977	Folded, 1977
San Francisco Sharks, Quebec Nordiques	San Francisco Sharks (never played)	1972	Joined NHL, 1979, as Quebec Nordiques (now Colorado Avalanche)
San Francisco Sharks, Quebec Nordiques	Quebec Nordiques	1972–1979	Joined NHL, 1979, as Quebec Nordiques (now Colorado Avalanche)
Winnipeg Jets	Winnipeg Jets	1972–1979	Joined NHL, 1979, as Winnipeg Jets (deactivated from 1996 to 1999, reactivated as Atlanta Thrashers, relocated back to Winnipeg in 2011)

== WHA All-Star Game ==
Every season of the World Hockey Association had an All-Star Game with four different formats. The most used format had the Western and Eastern Division each name their All-Stars, which was used four times. Twice saw world-based matchups and one matched the defending Avco Cup champion versus All-Star selections.

- 1973 Eastern Division 6, Western Division 2 @ Quebec
- 1974 Eastern Division 8, Western Division 4 @ St. Paul
- 1975 Western Division 6, Eastern Division 4 @ Edmonton
- 1976 Canadian-based teams (5) 6, US-based teams (9) 1 @ Cleveland
- 1977 Eastern Division 4, Western Division 2 @ Hartford
- 1978 AVCO Cup champion Quebec Nordiques 5, WHA All-Star team 4 @ Quebec
- 1979 WHA All-Star team vs Dynamo Moscow in a three-game series @ Edmonton. WHA won all 3 games 4–2, 4–2, 4–3

== Yearly standings ==
Avco Cup winner in bold.

Year	Division	1	2	3	4	5	6	7	8
1972–73
1972–73	Eastern	**New England Whalers**	Cleveland Crusaders	Philadelphia Blazers	Ottawa Nationals	Quebec Nordiques	New York Raiders		
1972–73	Western	Winnipeg Jets	Houston Aeros	Los Angeles Sharks	Minnesota Fighting Saints	Alberta Oilers	Chicago Cougars		
1973–74
1973–74	Eastern	New England Whalers	Toronto Toros	Cleveland Crusaders	Chicago Cougars	Quebec Nordiques	New York Golden Blades / Jersey Knights		
1973–74	Western	**Houston Aeros**	Minnesota Fighting Saints	Edmonton Oilers	Winnipeg Jets	Vancouver Blazers	Los Angeles Sharks		
1974–75	Canadian	Quebec Nordiques	Toronto Toros	Winnipeg Jets	Vancouver Blazers	Edmonton Oilers			
1974–75	Eastern	New England Whalers	Cleveland Crusaders	Chicago Cougars	Indianapolis Racers				
1974–75	Western	**Houston Aeros**	San Diego Mariners	Minnesota Fighting Saints	Phoenix Roadrunners	Michigan Stags / Baltimore Blades			
1975–76	Canadian	**Winnipeg Jets**	Quebec Nordiques	Calgary Cowboys	Edmonton Oilers	Toronto Toros	Denver Spurs / Ottawa Civics		
1975–76	Eastern	Indianapolis Racers	Cleveland Crusaders	New England Whalers	Cincinnati Stingers				
1975–76	Western	Houston Aeros	Phoenix Roadrunners	San Diego Mariners	Minnesota Fighting Saints				
1976–77
1976–77	Eastern	**Quebec Nordiques**	Cincinnati Stingers	Indianapolis Racers	New England Whalers	Birmingham Bulls	Minnesota Fighting Saints		
1976–77	Western	Houston Aeros	Winnipeg Jets	San Diego Mariners	Edmonton Oilers	Calgary Cowboys	Phoenix Roadrunners		
1977–78	WHA	**Winnipeg Jets**	New England Whalers	Houston Aeros	Quebec Nordiques	Edmonton Oilers	Birmingham Bulls	Cincinnati Stingers	Indianapolis Racers
1978–79	WHA	Edmonton Oilers	Quebec Nordiques	**Winnipeg Jets**	New England Whalers	Cincinnati Stingers	Birmingham Bulls	Indianapolis Racers	

== Hockey Hall of Fame members ==
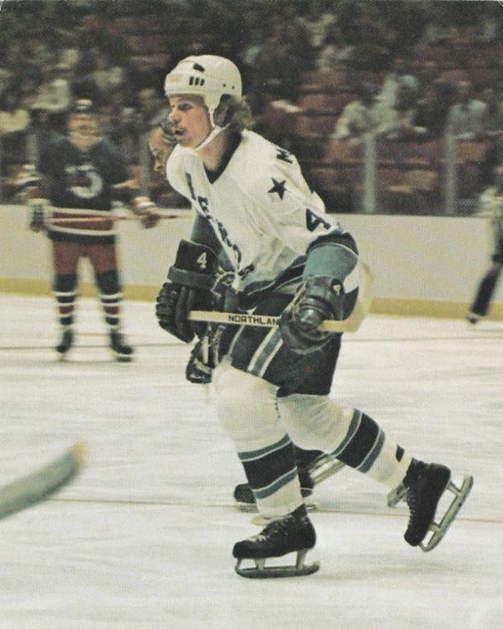
Mark Howe played six seasons in the WHA for the Houston Aeros and New England Whalers. Howe is one of only three Hockey Hall of Fame members to have played at least six of their professional seasons with the WHA, next to Bobby Hull (the only Hockey Hall of Famer to have played in every WHA season) and Gordie Howe.

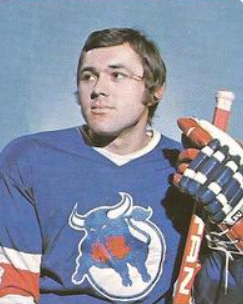
Václav Nedomanský was the first Czechoslovak hockey player to defect to North America for professional hockey when he joined the Toronto Toros in 1974. In 252 games, he scored 135 goals with 118 assists for 253 total points. In 2019, he was inducted into the Hockey Hall of Fame; he is the most recent WHA alumnus inducted into the Hall as a player.

22 people that were involved with the WHA have been inducted into the Hockey Hall of Fame.

World Hockey Association Hall of Famers
Players
Name	WHA Team	Tenure	Induction
Andy Bathgate	Vancouver Blazers	1974–1975	1978
Colin Campbell^{1}	Vancouver Blazers	1973–1974	2024
Gerry Cheevers	Cleveland Crusaders	1972–1976	1985
Mike Gartner	Cincinnati Stingers	1978–1979	2001
Michel Goulet	Birmingham Bulls	1978–1979	1998
Wayne Gretzky	Indianapolis Racers; Edmonton Oilers	1978–1979	1999
Gordie Howe^{1}	Houston Aeros; New England Whalers	1973–1979	1972
Mark Howe	Houston Aeros; New England Whalers	1973–1979	2011
Harry Howell	New York Golden Blades/Jersey Knights; San Diego Mariners; Calgary Cowboys	1973–1976	1979
Bobby Hull	Winnipeg Jets	1972–1979	1983
Dave Keon	Minnesota Fighting Saints; Indianapolis Racers; New England Whalers	1975–1979	1986
Rod Langway	Birmingham Bulls	1977–1978	2002
Frank Mahovlich	Toronto Toros; Birmingham Bulls	1974–1978	1981
Mark Messier	Cincinnati Stingers; Indianapolis Racers	1978–1979	2007
Vaclav Nedomansky	Toronto Toros; Birmingham Bulls	1974–1977	2019
Bernie Parent	Philadelphia Blazers	1972–1973	1984
Craig Patrick^{1}	Minnesota Fighting Saints	1976–1977	2001
Jacques Plante	Edmonton Oilers	1974–1975	1978
Norm Ullman	Edmonton Oilers	1975–1977	1982
Administrators
Name	Position	Tenure	Induction
Rudy Pilous	GM, Winnipeg Jets	1974-1978	1985
Bud Poile	WHA executive vice-president	1973–1976	1990
Maurice Richard^{1}	Coach, Quebec Nordiques	1972	1961
Glen Sather	Coach, Edmonton Oilers	1976–1979	1997

Notes:

- ^{1} Inducted prior to WHA play/inducted as Builder

== See also ==
- List of ice hockey leagues
- List of WHA head coaches
- World Hockey Association (proposed)
