= 1974 WHA playoffs =

WHA postseason tournament

Tournament details
- Dates: April 6 – May 19, 1974
- Season: 1973–74
- Teams: 8
- Defending champions: New England Whalers

Final positions
- Champions: Houston Aeros (1st title)
- Runners-up: Chicago Cougars

Tournament statistics
- Scoring leader(s): Larry Lund (Aeros) (23 points)

The 1974 WHA playoffs was the postseason tournament of the World Hockey Association's 1973–74 season. The second postseason tournament of the league, it featured four teams each of the Western and Eastern Division competing against each other for the right to play for the Avco World Trophy. The Houston Aeros, bolstered by Gordie Howe and his two sons Mark and Marty, dominated the first two rounds, losing just twice on their way as the Western Division champion. In the Eastern Division, the Chicago Cougars pulled off a string of upsets that saw them win in seven games for both rounds as the fourth seed in their bracket to reach the Avco Cup Final. In the Finals, the Aeros swept the Cougars in four games for their first Avco Cup championship.

== Playoff seeds ==
The top four teams in each division made the playoffs.

=== Eastern Division ===
1. New England Whalers, Eastern Division champions – 90 points
2. Toronto Toros – 86 points
3. Cleveland Crusaders – 83 points
4. Chicago Cougars – 81 points

=== Western Division ===
1. Houston Aeros, Western Division champions – 101 points
2. Minnesota Fighting Saints – 90 points
3. Edmonton Oilers – 79 points
4. Winnipeg Jets – 73 points

== Bracket ==
Quarterfinals
E1 | New England Whalers | 3
E4 | Chicago Cougars | 4
Eastern Division
E2 | Toronto Toros | 4
E3 | Cleveland Crusaders | 1
W1 | Houston Aeros | 4
W4 | Winnipeg Jets | 0
Western Division
W2 | Minnesota Fighting Saints | 4
W3 | Edmonton Oilers | 1

Semifinals
E4 | Chicago Cougars | 4
E2 | Toronto Toros | 3
W1 | Houston Aeros | 4
W2 | Minnesota Fighting Saints | 2

Finals
E4 | Chicago Cougars | 0
W1 | Houston Aeros | 4

== Division Semifinals ==
=== Eastern Division Semifinals ===
==== (E1) New England Whalers vs. (E4) Chicago Cougars ====
The series matched Chicago, a team that had a negative goal differential (271-273) with the Whalers, who had the 2nd best defense with a 5th best goal attack to go along with home-field advantage; the teams split the eight games played between them in the regular season. As decided in February, the Whalers played their postseason games in West Springfield, Massachusetts (they would play a portion of their games for the 1974-75 season there before moving fully to Hartford, Connecticut).

The Whalers won Game 1 after rallying from a 3-1 deficit in the first period. The Whalers won the first two games. Mike Byers shot the puck from the top of the faceoff circle that deflected off the skate of John French past the goalie to win Game 2 in overtime. The Cougars struck back with a dominant first period in Game 3. In Game 4, Chicago pulled their goalie with less than 40 seconds remaining to put six forwards on the ice and Duke Harris checked the puck and slid it to his teammate Bob Sicinski in the corner to get it to Jan Popiel, who put it past New England for the tying goal with 0:34 remaining. Ralph Backstrom ended the game with his overtime goal.

The teams traded wins on the road to set up a Game 7 in Springfield. Despite trailing 2-1 in the third period and even seeing their player/coach Pat Stapleton ejected, the Cougars rallied with three goals in the third period. As it turned out, Game 6 was the last playoff game played by the franchise at the International Amphitheatre, as the next home game would be moved to Randhurst Twin Ice Arena due to unforeseen commitments made at their venue. After the events of Game 7, the Whalers would stay in Springfield for parts of the next season before settling in Hartford.

| April 6 | Chicago Cougars | 4–6 (3–1, 1–3, 0–2) | New England Whalers | Eastern States Coliseum; Attendance: 5,516 |

Box score
| Cam Newton | Goalies | Al Smith |
1:52 (1st) – Jocelyn Hardy; 6:26 (1st) – Bob Sicinski; 10:52 (1st) – Darryl Maggs; 12:39 (2nd) – Duke Harris / Goals / 2:52 (1st) – Tom Webster; 8:10 (2nd) – Larry Pleau; 17:01 (2nd) – Tom Webster; 17:46 (2nd) – Larry Pleau; 0:31 (3rd) – John Danby; 14:29 (3rd) – Don Blackburn
| 40 (11–18–11) | Shots | 30 (10–11–9) |

| April 7 | Chicago Cougars | 3–4 (OT) (1–1, 1–1, 1–1, 0–1) | New England Whalers | Eastern States Coliseum; Attendance: 5,516 |

Box score
| Andre Gill | Goalies | Al Smith |
18:10 (1st) – Larry Mavety; 11:44 (2nd) – Jan Popiel; 6:04 (3rd) – Jocelyn Hardy / Goals / 4:26 (1st) – Tom Webster; 1:46 (2nd) – Tim Sheehy; 9:44 (3rd) – Al Karlander; 2:51 (OT) – John French
| 37 (12–15–9–1) | Shots | 37 (13–9–12–3) |

| April 9 | New England Whalers | 6–8 (0–5, 4–3, 2–0) | Chicago Cougars | International Amphitheatre; Attendance: 3,125 |

Box score
| Al Smith / Bruce Landon | Goalies | Cam Newton |
1:05 (2nd) – Mike Byers; 8:48 (2nd) – Don Blackburn; 9:23 (2nd) – John Cunniff; 9:43 (2nd) – John French; 8:58 (3rd) – Tim Sheehy; 13:56 (3rd) – Tim Sheehy / Goals / 2:57 (1st) – Don Gordon; 5:57 (1st) – Jocelyn Hardy; 10:29 (1st) – Rosaire Paiement; 13:47 (1st) – Bob Liddington; 16:48 (1st) – Jan Popiel; 7:35 (2nd) – Rosaire Paiement; 11:46 (2nd) – Bob Sicinski; 13:51 (2nd) – Bob Liddington
| 29 (9–9–11) | Shots | 28 (12–9–7) |

| April 10 | New England Whalers | 1–2 (OT) (0–0, 0–0, 1–1, 0–1) | Chicago Cougars | International Amphitheatre; Attendance: 3,452 |

Box score
| Al Smith | Goalies | Cam Newton |
9:36 (3rd) – Tim Sheehy / Goals / 19:35 (3rd) – Jan Popiel (19:35); 17:45 (OT) – Ralph Backstrom
| 30 (7–6–9–8) | Shots | 48 (7–12–14–15) |

| April 12 | Chicago Cougars | 4–2 (1–0, 1–2, 2–0) | New England Whalers | Eastern States Coliseum; Attendance: 5,513 |

Box score
| Andre Gill | Goalies | Al Smith |
11:29 (1st) – Duke Harris; 2:00 (2nd) – Duke Harris; 10:24 (3rd) – Larry Mavety; 16:52 (3rd) – Bob Sicinski / Goals / 17:11 (2nd) – Mike Byers; 17:51 (2nd) – John French
| 23 (6–6–11) | Shots | 27 (10–13–4) |

| April 14 | New England Whalers | 2–0 (0–0, 0–0, 2–0) | Chicago Cougars | International Amphitheatre; Attendance: 4,253 |

Box score
| Al Smith | Goalies | Cam Newton |
1:54 (3rd) – John French; 12:04 (3rd) – Rick Ley / Goals / No scoring
| 31 (14–9–8) | Shots | 31 (11–11–9) |

| April 16 | Chicago Cougars | 3–2 (1–0, 0–2, 2–0) | New England Whalers | Eastern States Coliseum; Attendance: 5,516 |

Box score
| Andre Gill | Goalies | Al Smith |
11:08 (1st) – Jocelyn Hardy; 10:23 (3rd) – Ralph Backstrom; 13:26 (3rd) – Jan Popiel / Goals / 6:20 (2nd) – Tom Webster; 9:58 (2nd) – Tom Webster
| 43 (7–12–24) | Shots | 27 (12–8–7) |

==== (E2) Toronto Toros vs. (E3) Cleveland Crusaders ====
Cleveland went 5-3 against Toronto in the regular season.

| April 7 | Cleveland Crusaders | 0–4 (0–1, 0–1, 0–2) | Toronto Toros | Maple Leaf Gardens; Attendance: 6,231 |

Box score
| Gerry Cheevers | Goalies | Gilles Gratton |
No scoring / Goals / 15:37 (1st) – Wayne Dillon; 17:20 (2nd) -Gavin Kirk; 6:24 (3rd) – Wayne Dillon; 19:55 (3rd) – Guy Trottier
| 29 (14–6–9) | Shots | 39 (13–13–13) |

| April 9 | Cleveland Crusaders | 3–4 (0–0, 3–1, 0–3) | Toronto Toros | Maple Leaf Gardens; Attendance: 5,177 |

Box score
| Gerry Cheevers | Goalies | Gilles Gratton |
5:06 (2nd) – Ron Ward; 11:45 (2nd) – Tom Edur; 15:28 (2nd) – Paul Andrea / Goals / 3:46 (2nd) – Tom Martin; 11:55 (3rd) – Wayne Carleton; 13:28 (3rd) – Wayne Carleton; 16:49 (3rd) – Tom Martin
| 27 (12–9–6) | Shots | 44 (14–14–16) |

| April 12 | Toronto Toros | 4–2 (1–1, 3–1, 0–0) | Cleveland Crusaders | Cleveland Arena; Attendance: 7,991 |

Box score
| Gilles Gratton | Goalies | Gerry Cheevers |
4:09 (1st) – Gavin Kirk; 12:41 (2nd) – Rick Sentes; 13:04 (2nd) – Rick Sentes; 19:23 (2nd) – Rick Sentes / Goals / 6:35 (1st) – Gary Jarrett; 15:36 (2nd) – Ron Morgan
| 30 (8–15–7) | Shots | 34 (14–5–15) |

| April 13 | Toronto Toros | 2–3 (OT) (1–0, 0–2, 1–0, 0–1) | Cleveland Crusaders | Cleveland Arena; Attendance: 8,212 |

Box score
| Gilles Gratton | Goalies | Gerry Cheevers |
8:29 (1st) – Brian Gibbons; 15:05 (3rd) – Tom Martin / Goals / 4:17 (2nd) – Russ Walker; 5:51 (2nd) – Ron Ward; 4:17 (OT) – Wayne Muloin
| 34 (8–10–14–2) | Shots | 39 (9–11–16–3) |

| April 14 | Cleveland Crusaders | 1–4 (0–3, 1–0, 0–1) | Toronto Toros | Maple Leaf Gardens; Attendance: 6,889 |

Box score
| Gerry Cheevers | Goalies | Gilles Gratton |
9:17 (2nd) – Ron Ward / Goals / 4:20 (1st) – Tom Simpson; 9:47 (1st) – Tom Simpson; 19:59 (1st) – Pat Hickey; 15:07 (3rd) – Pat Hickey
| 28 (6–9–13) | Shots | 49 (18–19–12) |

=== Western Division Semifinals ===
==== (W1) Houston Aeros vs. (W4) Winnipeg Jets ====
Houston had gone 5–1–2 against Winnipeg in the regular season.

After the first two games, Winnipeg goaltender Joe Daley and his backup Ernie Wakely each came down with pneumonia. Winnipeg was forced to loan a goalie, which resulted in them receiving Frank Blum (a goalie who had played just seven professional games in the WHA) from the Toronto Toros. In Game 3, Larry Lund led the attack for the Aeros, scoring four goals to set a new postseason record for goals that was not broken for five years. In total, Blum allowed fourteen goals in the resulting two games for the Jets as they were swept (as it turned out, Blum never played in the WHA ever again). This would be the first of four times the Aeros and Jets would face each other in the playoffs.

| April 8 | Houston Aeros | 5–2 (2–0, 0–0, 3–2) | Winnipeg Jets | Winnipeg Arena; Attendance: 8,446 |

Box score
| Don McLeod | Goalies | Joe Daley |
15:32 (1st) – Frank Hughes; 18:44 (1st) – Jim Sherrit; 3:02 (3rd) – Murray Hall; 6:14 (3rd) – Mark Howe; 15:58 (3rd) – Murray Hall / Goals / 3:40 (3rd) – Danny Johnson; 8:19 (3rd) – Norm Beaudin
| 35 (14–8–13) | Shots | 19 (6–10–3) |

| April 10 | Houston Aeros | 3–2 (0–1, 1–0, 2–1) | Winnipeg Jets | Winnipeg Arena; Attendance: 8,692 |

Box score
| Don McLeod | Goalies | Joe Daley |
16:24 (2nd) – Marty Howe; 7:58 (3rd) – Mark Howe; 9:00 (3rd) – Andre Hinse / Goals / 2:36 (1st) – Norm Beaudin; 11:39 (3rd) – Milt Black
| 22 (3–9–10) | Shots | 22 (6–9–7) |

| April 13 | Winnipeg Jets | 1–10 (0–5, 1–1, 0–4) | Houston Aeros | Sam Houston Coliseum; Attendance: 9,462 |

Box score
| Frank Blum | Goalies | Don McLeod |
11:03 (2nd) – Christian Bordeleau / Goals / 1:25 (1st) – Gordie Howe; 2:47 (1st) – Larry Lund; 4:27 (1st) – Gord Labossiere; 10:17 (1st) – Larry Lund; 19:59 (1st) – Ted Taylor; 0:22 (2nd) – Frank Hughes; 2:18 (3rd) – Larry Lund; 6:37 (3rd) – Larry Lund; 13:54 (3rd) – Don Grierson; 19:53 (3rd) – Frank Hughes
| 31 (7–11–13) | Shots | 44 (18–8–18) |

| April 14 | Winnipeg Jets | 4–5 (0–2, 1–2, 3–1) | Houston Aeros | Sam Houston Coliseum; Attendance: 8,474 |

Box score
| Frank Blum | Goalies | Don McLeod |
18:41 (2nd) – Christian Bordeleau; 2:26 (3rd) – Christian Bordeleau; 8:57 (3rd) – Norm Beaudin; 13:52 (3rd) – Bobby Hull / Goals / 11:27 (1st) – John Schella; 15:46 (1st) – Larry Hale; 1:27 (2nd) – Murray Hall; 14:53 (2nd) – Ted Taylor; 6:33 (3rd) – Mark Howe
| 26 (10–8–8) | Shots | 30 (12–13–5) |

==== (W2) Minnesota Fighting Saints vs. (W3) Edmonton Oilers ====
Edmonton went 5–3 against Minnesota in the regular season.

| April 6 | Edmonton Oilers | 1–2 (0–0, 1–2, 0–0) | Minnesota Fighting Saints | St. Paul Civic Center; Attendance: 13,004 |

Box score
| Jack Norris | Goalies | John Garrett |
2:39 (2nd) – Blair MacDonald / Goals / 9:09 (2nd) – Murray Heatley; 9:38 (2nd) – Mike Walton
| 34 (10–12–12) | Shots | 37 (12–16–9) |

| April 7 | Edmonton Oilers | 5–8 (0–2, 1–3, 4–3) | Minnesota Fighting Saints | St. Paul Civic Center; Attendance: 11,756 |

Box score
| Jack Norris / Chris Worthy | Goalies | Mike Curran |
16:20 (2nd) – Blair MacDonald; 9:52 (3rd) – Bob McAneeley; 11:45 (3rd) – Tom Gilmore; 13:39 (3rd) – Bobby Sheehan; 19:04 (3rd) – Blair MacDonald / Goals / 3:36 (1st) – John Arbour; 18:24 (1st) – George Morrison; 7:33 (2nd) – Terry Ball; 10:53 (2nd) – Mike Walton; 12:04 (2nd) – Gord Gallant; 0:10 (3rd) – John Arbour; 18:32 (3rd) – Ted Hampson; 19:28 (3rd) – Mike Walton
| 42 (7–19–16) | Shots | 36 (13–14–9) |

| April 10 | Minnesota Fighting Saints | 6–2 (1–0, 2–1, 3–1) | Edmonton Oilers | Edmonton Gardens; Attendance: 4,606 |

Box score
| John Garrett | Goalies | Ian Wilkie / Jack Norris |
9:18 (1st) – George Morrison; 0:26 (2nd) – Bob MacMillan; 1:29 (2nd) – Bill Klatt; 0:35 (3rd) – Bob MacMillan; 6:55 (3rd) – Wayne Connelly; 14:18 (3rd) – Bill Klatt / Goals / 10:08 (2nd) – Al Hamilton; 15:25 (3rd) – Ross Perkins
| 29 (9–11–9) | Shots | 41 (12–15–14) |

| April 12 | Minnesota Fighting Saints | 1–2 (0–0, 0–1, 1–1) | Edmonton Oilers | Edmonton Gardens; Attendance: 5,200 |

Box score
| Mike Curran | Goalies | Chris Worthy |
19:22 (3rd) – Wayne Connelly / Goals / 7:53 (2nd) – Val Fonteyne; 7:06 (3rd) – Eddie Joyal
| 25 (8–5–12) | Shots | 36 (10–12–14) |

| April 14 | Edmonton Oilers | 4–5 (0–2, 2–2, 2–1) | Minnesota Fighting Saints | Saint Paul Civic Center; Attendance: 10,764 |

Box score
| Chris Worthy | Goalies | John Garrett |
0:20 (2nd) – Ken Baird; 6:09 (2nd) – Eddie Joyal; 7:30 (3rd) – Doug Barrie; 11:42 (3rd) – Blair MacDonald / Goals / 19:05 (1st) – Mike Walton; 19:20 (1st) – Mike Walton; 2:20 (2nd) – George Morrison; 15:45 (2nd) – Wayne Connelly; 5:32 (3rd) – Mike Walton
| 40 (7–13–20) | Shots | 35 (19–9–7) |

== Division Finals ==
=== Eastern Division Finals ===
==== (E2) Toronto Toros vs. (E4) Chicago Cougars ====
Both teams played their games away from their usual homes: The Cougars, left with no choice due to commitments for a production of Peter Pan while team president Walter Kaiser did not want to pay the $75,000 to get the International Amphitheatre ready for hockey again. As such, they played at Randhurst Twin Ice Arena while the Toros elected to play their postseason games at Maple Leaf Gardens. Chicago had gone 5–2–1 against Toronto in the regular season.

| April 19 | Chicago Cougars | 4–6 (1–1, 2–2, 1–3) | Toronto Toros | Maple Leaf Gardens; Attendance: 8,088 |

Box score
| Cam Newton | Goalies | Gilles Gratton / Les Binkley |
8:45 (1st) – Jim Benzelock; 12:39 (2nd) – Duke Harris; 18:01 (2nd) – Rick Morris; 2:03 (3rd) – Rod Zaine / Goals / 0:43 (1st) – Steve Cuddie; 4:56 (2nd) – Wayne Dillon; 8:17 (2nd) – Tom Martin; 10:57 (3rd) – Rick Sentes; 12:41 (3rd) – Bob Leduc; 18:29 (3rd) – Wayne Dillon
| 34 (10–17–7) | Shots | 37 (12–9–16) |

| April 22 | Chicago Cougars | 4–3 (1–0, 2–3, 1–0) | Toronto Toros | Maple Leaf Gardens; Attendance: 8,169 |

Box score
| Andre Gill | Goalies | Les Binkley |
7:55 (1st) – Ralph Backstrom; 14:00 (2nd) – Don Gordon; 15:12 (2nd) – Ralph Backstrom; 9:28 (3rd) – Frank Rochon / Goals / 8:55 (2nd) – Bob Leduc; 9:07 (2nd) – Tom Martin; 13:27 (2nd) – Wayne Dillon
| 29 (6–13–10) | Shots | 38 (11–16–11) |

| April 28 | Toronto Toros | 2–3 (2–1, 0–0, 0–2) | Chicago Cougars | Randhurst Twin Ice Arena; Attendance: 2,780 |

Box score
| Gilles Gratton / Les Binkley | Goalies | Andre Gill |
10:40 (1st) – Bob Leduc; 16:40 (1st) – Brian Gibbons / Goals / 15:00 (1st) – Bob Sicinski; 1:26 (3rd) – Rosaire Paiement; 6:42 (3rd) – Rosaire Paiement
| 24 (7–8–9) | Shots | 32 (11–10–11) |

| April 30 | Toronto Toros | 7–6 (2–2, 5–2, 0–2) | Chicago Cougars | Randhurst Twin Ice Arena; Attendance: 2,648 |

Box score
| Les Binkley / Gilles Gratton | Goalies | Andre Gill / Cam Newton |
1:51 (1st) – Wayne Carleton; 14:37 (1st) – Guy Trottier; 3:39 (2nd) – Tom Simpson; 6:42 (2nd) – Guy Trottier; 11:58 (2nd) – Bob Leduc; 14:15 (2nd) – Guy Trottier; 19:49 (2nd) – Rick Sentes / Goals / 14:59 (1st) – Larry Mavety; 16:19 (1st) – Rosaire Paiement; 8:34 (2nd) – Jim Benzelock; 10:48 (2nd) – Jan Popiel; 3:22 (3rd) – Rick Morris; 4:04 (3rd) – Bob Liddington
| 30 (9–12–9) | Shots | 36 (15–11–10) |

| May 1 | Chicago Cougars | 3–5 (0–2, 3–1, 0–2) | Toronto Toros | Maple Leaf Gardens; Attendance: 8,456 |

Box score
| Cam Newton | Goalies | Gilles Gratton |
4:17 (2nd) – Rosaire Paiement; 11:54 (2nd) – Duke Harris; 18:08 (2nd - Jim Watson / Goals / 3:46 (1st) – Billy Orr; 10:34 (1st) – Brit Selby; 9:41 (2nd) – Pat Hickey; 5:02 (3rd) – Jack Gibson; 12:08 (3rd) – Guy Trottier
| 26 (6–12–8) | Shots | 34 (8–9–17) |

| May 4 | Toronto Toros | 2–9 (1–4, 0–3, 1–2) | Chicago Cougars | Randhurst Twin Ice Arena; Attendance: 2,633 |

Box score
| Les Binkley | Goalies | Andre Gill |
1:19 (1st) – Tom Martin; 12:32 (3rd) – Rick Sentes / Goals / 0:51 (1st) – Bob Liddington; 4:06 (1st) – Bob Sicinski; 8:01 (1st) – Rosaire Paiement; 18:31 (1st) – Darryl Maggs; 13:44 (2nd) – Don Gordon; 15:59 (2nd) – Rod Zaine; 17:50 (2nd) – Rosaire Paiement; 2:16 (3rd) – Rosaire Paiement; 15:51 (3rd) – Jan Popiel
| 27 (9–10–8) | Shots | 38 (14–12–12) |

| May 6 | Chicago Cougars | 5–2 (0–1, 4–0, 1–1) | Toronto Toros | Maple Leaf Gardens; Attendance: 8,791 |

Box score
| Andre Gill | Goalies | Gilles Gratton |
0:39 (2nd) – Bob Liddington; 7:43 (2nd) – Jan Popiel; 14:12 (2nd) – Bob Sicinski; 16:32 (2nd) – Darryl Maggs; 0:26 (3rd) – Duke Harris / Goals / 14:22 (1st) – Tom Simpson; 6:22 (3rd) – Rick Sentes
| 28 (12–9–7) | Shots | 38 (17–8–13) |

=== Western Division Finals ===
==== (W1) Houston Aeros vs. (W2) Minnesota Fighting Saints ====
Minnesota had scored the most goals in the league (332) while Houston had scored the 2nd most (318), but Houston had the best defense in the league (allowing just 219 goals) compared to Minnesota (7th). Houston had gone 5–3 against Minnesota in the regular season. Game 2 was marred by a fight that saw Saints winger Gord Gallant ejected in the second period after getting into an altercation with Gordie Howe of the Aeros. When trying to get into the dressing room, him and several of his teammates got into a shoving match with fans. The result was that the two teams were sent to take a considerable break before playing the remaining five minutes of the second period as the beginning of the third period.

Game 4 set an attendance record for a WHA game with over 17,000 in attendance; no WHA playoff game would ever top the game in attendance.

| April 18 | Minnesota Fighting Saints | 5–4 (OT) (2–1, 1–1, 1–2, 1–0) | Houston Aeros | Sam Houston Coliseum; Attendance: 8,484 |

Box score
| John Garrett | Goalies | Don McLeod |
6:42 (1st) – John Arbour; 12:55 (1st) – Bill Klatt; 1:53 (2nd) – Jim Johnson; 9:23 (3rd) – Mike McMahon Jr; 1:40 (OT) – Mike Walton / Goals / 8:55 (1st) – Mark Howe; 8:10 (2nd) – Poul Popiel; 1:55 (3rd) – Larry Lund; 10:46 (3rd) – Ted Taylor
| 33 (9–8–13–3) | Shots | 44 (19–11–14–0) |

| April 20 | Minnesota Fighting Saints | 2–5 (1–3, 1–2, 0–0) | Houston Aeros | Sam Houston Coliseum; Attendance: 9,314 |

Box score
| John Garrett | Goalies | Don McLeod |
18:31 (1st) – Wayne Connelly; 3:21 (2nd) – Mike Walton / Goals / 7:26 (1st) – Andre Hinse; 15:59 (1st) – Larry Lund; 18:43 (1st) – Murray Hall; 8:23 (2nd) – Mark Howe; 10:10 (2nd) – Gord Labossiere
| 14 (4–8–2) | Shots | 50 (20–18–12) |

| April 21 | Houston Aeros | 1–4 (1–0, 0–3, 0–1) | Minnesota Fighting Saints | St. Paul Civic Center; Attendance: 16,412 |

Box score
| Don McLeod | Goalies | Mike Curran |
11:03 (1st) – Frank Hughes / Goals / 5:06 (2nd) – George Morrison; 17:14 (2nd) – Ted Hampson; 17:34 (2nd) – George Morrison; 14:05 (3rd) – Wayne Connelly
| 20 (10–5–5) | Shots | 36 (6–15–15) |

| April 28 | Houston Aeros | 4–1 (1–0, 1–1, 2–0) | Minnesota Fighting Saints | St. Paul Civic Center; Attendance: 17,211 |

Box score
| Don McLeod | Goalies | Mike Curran |
1:08 (1st) – John Schella; 5:28 (2nd) – Gordie Howe; 8:31 (3rd) – Gord Labossiere; 10:08 (3rd) – Frank Hughes / Goals / 13:43 (2nd) – Wayne Connelly
| 34 (11–7–16) | Shots | 32 (9–9–14) |

| April 29 | Minnesota Fighting Saints | 4–9 (0–3, 1–4, 3–2) | Houston Aeros | Sam Houston Coliseum; Attendance: 9,874 |

Box score
| John Garrett | Goalies | Don McLeod |
4:11 (2nd) – Mike Antonovich; 2:18 (3rd) – Mike Walton; 11:19 (3rd) – Mike Walton; 18:37 (3rd) – Ted Hampson / Goals / 10:31 (1st) – Andre Hinse; 15:48 (1st) – Mark Howe; 16:30 (1st) – Gordie Howe; 13:30 (2nd) – Mark Howe; 14:45 (2nd) – Gord Labossiere; 16:08 (2nd) – Frank Hughes; 19:18 (2nd) – Larry Lund; 1:01 (3rd) – Murray Hall; 4:09 (3rd) – Jim Sherrit
| 24 (5–10–9) | Shots | 51 (25–11–15) |

| May 1 | Houston Aeros | 3–1 (0–0, 1–1, 2–0) | Minnesota Fighting Saints | St. Paul Civic Center; Attendance: 12,422 |

Box score
| Don McLeod | Goalies | Mike Curran / John Garrett |
16:20 (2nd) – Mark Howe; 9:08 (3rd) – Jim Sherrit; 19:27 (3rd) – Mark Howe / Goals / 3:39 (2nd) – Ted Hampson
| 37 (13–11–13) | Shots | 31 (13–12–6) |

== Avco Cup Final ==
=== (W1) Houston Aeros vs. (E4) Chicago Cougars ===
The series matched the Houston Aeros, as coached by Bill Dineen against the Chicago Cougars, as coached by player-coach Pat Stapleton. Houston had gone 4–2 against Chicago in the regular season.

The Aeros, having lost only one playoff game leading to the Finals, had eleven days off from their last game prior to the Final, while Chicago had six days of rest. The Final matched two brothers with Jan Popiel for Chicago (who finished the postseason tied for third-most goals with 8) and Poul Popiel for Houston (who tied the postseason for most assists with 14). The New York Times, noting the Cougars playing their home games at a suburban shopping‐center ice rink with the Randhurst Twin Ice Arena, called the Final a "Supermarket Series". Ironically, the same production that forced Chicago out of their arena was now in Houston that forced Game 3 and 4 to be hosted by the Aeros rather than Game 1 and Game 2. All games were played at 8:30pm EST.

3,000 fans attended the inaugural game in Chicago. Houston took the lead early in Game 1, but Chicago threatened late and tied the game in the third period before the Aeros scored with four minutes remaining to take the lead again and win. The next three games saw Houston dominate and never trail at any moment on their way to a sweep. 9,874 fans attended Game 3 in Houston, Texas, the first professional hockey championship game in the state. In Game 4, to a crowd of 9,874 fans in Houston, Murray Hall scored the series-winning goal at 16:55 in the first period as Houston utilized a three-goal first period to bury the Cougars 6–2. This was the first professional sports championship for Houston since the Houston Oilers won the AFL in 1961. Gordie Howe (who also stated his interest in maybe playing a second season with Houston), noting the chance he got to have to play with his sons Mark and Marty, stated at the time that the Avco Cup championship probably meant more to him than the four Stanley Cups he had won with Detroit.

| May 12 | Chicago Cougars | 2–3 | Houston Aeros | Randhurst Twin Ice Arena | Recap |
| No scoring | | First period | 6:31 – Larry Hale (Hall, Labossiere); 9:19 – Gord Labossiere (Taylor, Grierson) |
| No scoring | | Second period | No scoring |
| 5:42 – Bob Liddington (Stapleton, Backstrom); 13:45 – Don Gordon (Mavety, Proceviat) | | Third period | 15:48 – Frank Hughes |
| Andre Gill 26 saves / 29 shots | | Goalie stats | Don McLeod 29 saves / 31 shots |

| May 15 | Chicago Cougars | 1–6 | Houston Aeros | Randhurst Twin Ice Arena | Recap |
| No scoring | | First period | 13:21 – Murray Hall (Taylor, Lund); 18:08 – Gord Labossiere (P. Popiel, Taylor) |
| No scoring | | Second period | 16:50 – Andre Hinse (G. Howe, Hughes) |
| 19:44 – Frank Rochon | | Third period | 1:59 – Jim Sherrit (Mark Howe, G. Howe); 2:23 – Andre Hinse (Lund, Hughes); 13:16 – Ted Taylor (Hall) |
| Andre Gill & Cam Newton 26 saves / 32 shots | | Goalie stats | Don McLeod 26 saves / 27 shots |

| May 17 | Houston Aeros | 7–4 | Chicago Cougars | Sam Houston Coliseum | Recap |
| 5:19 – Murray Hall; 10:51 – Frank Hughes (G. Howe, Hinse); 13:22 – Mark Howe (Sherrit, G. Howe) | | First period | 12:17 – Ralph Backstrom |
| 1:34 – Andre Hinse (G. Howe, P. Popiel); 3:21 – Larry Hale (Sherrit); 14:08 – Andre Hinse (Lund, P. Popiel) | | Second period | 5:01 – Rosaire Paiement; 11:38 – Rick Morris (Hardy, Gordon); 15:34 – Larry Mavety (Stapleton, Sicinski) |
| 0:48 – Frank Hughes (Hinse) | | Third period | No scoring |
| Don McLeod 24 saves / 28 shots | | Goalie stats | Andre Gill 13 saves / 19 shots Cam Newton 10 saves / 11 shots |

| May 19 | Houston Aeros | 6–2 | Chicago Cougars | Sam Houston Coliseum | Recap |
| 14:34 – Larry Lund (Hinse, Hale); 15:47 – Murray Hall (Mark Howe, G. Howe); 16:55 – Murray Hall (P. Popiel, G. Howe) | | First period | No scoring |
| 12:40 – Andre Hinse (G. Howe, P. Popiel); 13:58 – Gord Labossiere (P. Popiel, Schella); 15:52 – Larry Lund (G. Howe, P. Popiel) | | Second period | 17:29 – Jan Popiel (Paiement, Sicinski) |
| No scoring | | Third period | 10:12 – Rick Morris (Mavety) |
| Don McLeod 28 saves / 30 shots | | Goalie stats | Cam Newton 29 saves / 35 shots |

| Houston won series 4–0 |

== Statistical leaders ==
=== Skaters ===
These were the top ten skaters based on points. Bold denotes the statistical leader.

| Player | Team | GP | G | A | Pts | PIM |
|---|---|---|---|---|---|---|
| Larry Lund | Houston Aeros | 14 | 9 | **14** | **23** | 56 |
| Ralph Backstrom | Chicago Cougars | 18 | 5 | **14** | 19 | 4 |
| Mark Howe | Houston Aeros | 14 | 9 | 10 | 19 | 4 |
| Mike Walton | Minnesota Fighting Saints | 11 | **10** | 8 | 18 | 16 |
| Andre Hinse | Houston Aeros | 14 | 8 | 9 | 17 | 18 |
| Gordie Howe | Houston Aeros | 13 | 3 | **14** | 17 | 34 |
| Gord Labossiere | Houston Aeros | 14 | 7 | 9 | 16 | 20 |
| Murray Hall | Houston Aeros | 14 | 9 | 6 | 15 | 6 |
| Rosaire Paiement | Chicago Cougars | 18 | 9 | 6 | 15 | 16 |
| Poul Popiel | Houston Aeros | 14 | 1 | **14** | 15 | 22 |

=== Goaltending ===
These were the top eight goaltenders in terms of minutes.

| Player | Team | GP | GA | SA | SV | SV% | SO | MIN |
|---|---|---|---|---|---|---|---|---|
| Don McLeod | Houston Aeros | **14** | 35 | **386** | **351** | .909 | 0 | **842** |
| Andre Gill | Chicago Cougars | 11 | 38 | 318 | 280 | .881 | 0 | 614 |
| Gilles Gratton | Toronto Toros | 10 | 25 | 287 | 262 | .913 | **1** | 539 |
| Cam Newton | Chicago Cougars | 10 | 34 | 254 | 220 | .866 | 0 | 486 |
| Al Smith | New England Whalers | 7 | 21 | 240 | 219 | .913 | **1** | 399 |
| John Garrett | Minnesota Fighting Saints | 7 | 25 | 256 | 231 | .902 | 0 | 372 |
| Gerry Cheevers | Cleveland Crusaders | 5 | 18 | 196 | 178 | .908 | 0 | 303 |
| Mike Curran | Minnesota Fighting Saints | 5 | 14 | 161 | 147 | **.913** | 0 | 289 |

== Championship roster ==
1973–74 Houston Aeros

=== Players ===
Centres

- Joe Szura
- Jim Sherrit
- Murray Hall
- Ed Hoekstra (did not play) (Note: In the 1974 media guide, Hoekstra, who did not play in the playoffs, is listed as part of the championship roster. On the miniature Avco Trophy given out to players for the win, however, Hoekstra was not listed on the plaque as part of the team.)
- Gord Labossiere
- Larry Lund

Wingers

- Gary Williamson
- Jack Stanfield
- Marty Howe
- Andre Hinse
- Don Grierson
- Ted Taylor (Captain)
- Frank Hughes
- Gordie Howe

Defencemen

- Dunc McCallum (did not play)
- Bill Prentice
- Gordon Kannegiesser
- Larry Hale
- John Schella
- Poul Popiel
- Mark Howe

Goaltenders

- Don McLeod
- Wayne Rutledge (did not play in playoffs)
- Ron Grahame (did not play in playoffs)

=== Coaching and administrative staff ===
- Bill Dineen (Head Coach)
- James S. Smith (President and General Manager)
- Doug Harvey (Asst. Coach)
- Irvin Kaplan (Chairman of the Board)
- Bobby Brown (Head Trainer), Bobby Kincaid (Assistant Trainer)
