= List of Houston Aeros players =

This is a list of players who played at least one game for the Houston Aeros of the World Hockey Association from 1972–73 to 1977–78.

== Key ==
- † Won a Avco World Trophy with the Aeros

General abbreviations
Abbreviation	Definition
GP	Games played
HHOF	Inducted into the Hockey Hall of Fame as a player
AWT	Won the Avco World Trophy with the team, followed by year(s) won

Goaltender statistical abbreviations
Abbreviation	Definition
W	Wins
L	Losses
T	Ties
SO	Shutouts
GAA	Goals against average

Skater statistical abbreviations
Abbreviation	Definition
Pos	Position
G	Goals
A	Assists
P	Points
PIM	Penalty minutes
D	Defense
LW	Left wing
C	Center
RW	Right wing

== Goaltenders ==
Goaltenders who played for the Houston Aeros
Name	Seasons (Note: The seasons column lists the first year of the season of the player's first game and the last year of the season of the player's last game. For example, a player who played one game in the 1972–1973 season would be listed as playing with the team from 1972–1973, regardless of what calendar year the game occurred within.)	Regular season						Playoffs					Notes
Name	Seasons	GP	W	L	T	SO	GAA	GP	W	L	SO	GAA	Notes
Ron Grahame†	1973–1977	143	102	37	3	12	2.99	36	–	–	4	–	AWT: 1975
Bill Hughes	1972–1973	3	0	1	1	0	3.88	–	–	–	–	–	
Don McLeod†	1972–1974	90	51	33	4	4	3.01	17	–	–	0	–	AWT: 1974
Wayne Rutledge†	1972–1978	175	94	72	7	6	3.26	16	–	–	0	–	AWT: 1974, 1975
Ernie Wakely	1977–1978	51	28	18	4	2	3.24	–	–	–	–	–	
Lynn Zimmerman	1977–1978	20	10	9	0	0	4.32	4	–	–	0	–	

== Skaters ==
Skaters who played for the Houston Aeros
Name	Pos	Seasons	Regular season					Playoffs					Notes
Name	Pos	Seasons	GP	G	A	P	PIM	GP	G	A	P	PIM	Notes
Bill Butters	D	1975–1976	14	0	4	4	18	17	0	3	3	51	
Scott Campbell	D	1977–1978	75	8	29	37	116	6	1	1	2	8	
Cam Connor	LW	1976–1978	144	56	48	104	441	13	4	4	8	69	
Gary Donaldson	RW	1976–1977	5	0	0	0	6	–	–	–	–	–	
Mike Fedorko	D	1976–1977	4	0	0	0	0	–	–	–	–	–	
John Gray	RW	1976–1978	124	56	43	99	105	12	0	4	4	18	
Don Grierson†	RW	1972–1974	143	33	40	73	128	17	1	5	6	29	AWT: 1974
Larry Hale†	D	1972–1978	413	12	95	107	214	65	4	15	19	22	AWT: 1974, 1975
Murray Hall†	RW	1972–1976	312	96	125	221	155	54	21	17	38	32	AWT: 1974, 1975
Ron Hansis	RW	1976–1978	100	17	12	29	57	14	2	2	4	8	
Duke Harris	RW	1972–1973	75	30	12	42	14	10	1	1	2	4	
Andre Hinse†	LW	1973–1977	240	100	144	244	65	42	15	16	31	28	AWT: 1974, 1975
Ed Hoekstra	RW	1972–1974	97	13	28	41	12	9	1	2	3	0	
Gordie Howe†	RW	1973–1977	285	121	248	369	263	54	20	37	57	96	AWT: 1974, 1975; HHOF – 1972
Mark Howe†	LW	1973–1977	279	136	170	306	134	55	29	42	71	24	AWT: 1974, 1975; HHOF – 2011
Marty Howe†	D	1973–1977	308	48	92	140	363	52	8	12	20	64	AWT: 1974, 1975
Frank Hughes†	RW	1972–1978	344	149	151	300	153	54	24	16	40	33	AWT: 1974, 1975
John Hughes	D	1977–1978	79	3	25	28	130	6	1	1	2	6	
Glen Irwin†	D	1974–1978	189	7	23	30	437	18	0	2	2	17	AWT: 1975
Gord Kannegiesser†	D	1972–1974	123	0	30	30	58	12	0	3	3	13	AWT: 1974
Gord Labossiere†	C	1972–1976	301	101	162	263	144	50	16	28	44	46	AWT: 1974, 1975
Andre Lacroix	C	1977–1978	78	36	77	113	57	6	2	2	4	0	
Ray Larose	D	1972–1973	68	1	10	11	25	–	–	–	–	–	
Don Larway†	RW	1974–1978	299	87	82	169	279	38	12	8	20	33	AWT: 1975
Bob Liddington	LW	1975–1976	2	0	0	0	2	–	–	–	–	–	
Morris Lukowich	LW	1976–1978	148	67	53	120	198	17	7	6	13	36	
Larry Lund†	C	1972–1978	459	149	277	426	419	59	20	45	65	116	AWT: 1974, 1975
John Mazur	LW	1977–1978	1	0	0	0	0	–	–	–	–	–	
Dunc McCallum	D	1972–1973	69	9	20	29	112	10	2	3	5	6	
Brian McDonald	RW	1972–1973	71	20	20	40	78	10	3	0	3	16	
Al McLeod†	D	1976–1978	131	9	43	52	74	16	2	3	5	11	AWT: 1974
Keke Mortson	C	1972–1973; 1977–1978	73	13	17	30	102	12	0	4	4	16	
Dwayne Pentland	D	1976–1977	29	1	2	3	6	2	0	0	0	0	
Jan Popiel	LW	1975–1976	67	4	7	11	59	8	1	1	2	4	
Poul Popiel†	D	1972–1978	467	62	265	327	618	71	7	47	54	118	AWT: 1974, 1975
Bill Prentice†	D	1972–1975	75	1	6	7	54	14	0	0	0	5	AWT: 1974, 1975
Rich Preston†	LW	1974–1978	308	105	120	225	149	41	8	17	25	24	AWT: 1975
Terry Ruskowski†	C	1974–1978	294	63	188	251	550	44	17	24	41	151	AWT: 1975
John Schella†	D	1972–1978	385	39	143	182	844	66	4	25	29	143	AWT: 1974, 1975
Jim Sherrit†	C	1973–1975	153	52	53	105	43	27	8	10	18	8	AWT: 1974, 1975
Brian Smith	LW	1972–1973	48	7	6	13	19	10	0	2	2	0	
Jack Stanfield†	LW	1972–1974	112	9	15	24	10	16	1	0	1	2	AWT: 1974
Mike Stevens	D	1975–1976	6	0	0	0	2	–	–	–	–	–	
Joe Szura†	C	1973–1974	42	8	7	15	4	10	0	0	0	0	AWT: 1974
Ted Taylor†	RW	1972–1978	421	123	164	287	600	63	18	21	39	147	AWT: 1974, 1975
Paul Terbenche	D	1977–1978	–	–	–	–	–	6	1	1	2	0	
John Tonelli	C	1975–1978	224	64	86	150	278	34	11	14	25	28	
Steve West	C	1976–1978	74	11	21	32	25	19	1	1	2	0	
Gary Williamson†	LW	1973–1974	9	2	6	8	0	12	0	0	0	0	AWT: 1974
