= List of Toronto Toros players =

This is a list of players who played at least one game for the Toronto Toros of the World Hockey Association from 1973–74 to 1975–76.

== A ==
Mike Amodeo, Steve Atkinson,

== B ==
Gilles Bilodeau, Les Binkley, Frank Blum, Carl Brewer,

== C ==
Wayne Carleton, Paul Crowley, Steve Cuddie, Rick Cunningham,

== D ==
Bob D'Alvise, Wayne Dillon, Jim Dorey, Rich Dupras,

== F ==
Richard Farda, Tony Featherstone, Peter Folco, Rick Foley,

== G ==
John Garrett, Brian Gibbons, Gerard Gibbons, Jack Gibson, Gilles Gratton,

== H ==
Paul Heaver, Paul Henderson, Pat Hickey, Bill Holden,

== J ==
Jeff Jacques,

== K ==
Steve King, Gavin Kirk, George Kuzmicz,

== L ==
Bob Leduc,

== M ==
Frank Mahovlich, Peter Marrin, Tom Martin, Larry Mavety,

== N ==
Mark Napier, Vaclav Nedomansky, Greg Neeld, Lou Nistico,

== O ==
Billy Orr,

== P ==
Jean-Luc Phaneuf,

== R ==
Jerry Rollins,

== S ==
Brit Selby, Rick Sentes, Jim Shaw, Tom Simpson, Dave Syvret,

== T ==
Dave Tataryn, Gord Titcomb, Guy Trottier, Jim Turkiewicz,

== V ==
John Van Horlick, Mario Viens,

== W ==
Steve Warr, Wayne Wood,

== Z ==
Jerry Zrymiak,
