= 1975 WHA All-Star Game =

	1	2	3	Total
East	2	1	1	4
West	2	4	0	6
- Date: January 21, 1975
- Arena: Edmonton Coliseum
- City: Edmonton, Alberta
- MVP: Rejean Houle
- Attendance: 15,326

The 1975 World Hockey Association All-Star Game was held in the recently opened Edmonton Coliseum in Edmonton, Alberta, home of the Edmonton Oilers, on January 21, 1975. The game pitted the East All-Stars, which consisted of players from the four Eastern Division teams (Chicago, Cleveland, Indianapolis and New England), Toronto and Quebec of the Canadian Division, and Michigan of the Western Division, against the West All-Stars, which consisted of players from the four remaining Western Division teams (Houston, Minnesota, Phoenix and San Diego) and Edmonton, Vancouver and Winnipeg of the Canadian Division.

The West All-Stars defeated the East All-Stars 6–4. Rejean Houle, who scored two goals and assisted on two others for the East, was named the game's Most Valuable Player.

== Team Lineups ==
=== East All-Stars ===
- Coach: Ron Ryan (New England Whalers)

Nat.	Player	Pos.	Team
Goaltenders
(Canada)	Al Smith^{B}		New England Whalers
(Canada)	Gerry Cheevers^{A}		Cleveland Crusaders
(Canada)	Andy Brown^{C}		Indianapolis Racers
Defencemen
(Canada)	Pat Stapleton^{B}		Chicago Cougars
(Canada)	Brad Selwood^{B}		New England Whalers
(Canada)	Rick Ley^{C}		New England Whalers
(Canada)	Dale Hoganson		Quebec Nordiques
(Canada)	Jim Dorey^{C}		Toronto Toros
(Canada)	J. C. Tremblay^{A}		Quebec Nordiques
(Canada)	Paul Shmyr^{A‡}		Cleveland Crusaders
Forwards
(Canada)	Serge Bernier^{A}	C	Quebec Nordiques
(Canada)	Rejean Houle^{C}	RW	Quebec Nordiques
(Canada)	Marc Tardif	LW	Quebec Nordiques
(Canada)	Wayne Dillon^{B}	C	Toronto Toros
(Canada)	Tom Simpson^{A}	RW	Toronto Toros
(Canada)	Paul Henderson^{B}	LW	Toronto Toros
(Canada)	Frank Mahovlich^{A}	LW	Toronto Toros
(Canada)	Ralph Backstrom^{C}	C	Chicago Cougars
(United States)	Larry Pleau	C	New England Whalers
(Canada)	Tom Webster^{B}	RW	New England Whalers
(Canada)	Gary Veneruzzo	RW	Michigan Stags
(Canada)	Pierre Guite^{C‡}	LW	Michigan Stags

- ^{A} Voted to first team.
- ^{B} Voted to second team.
- ^{C} Voted to third team.
- ^{‡} Unable to participate due to injury.

=== West All-Stars ===
- Coach: Bill Dineen (Houston Aeros)

Nat.	Player	Pos.	Team
Goaltenders
(Canada)	Don McLeod^{B}		Vancouver Blazers
(Canada)	Wayne Rutledge^{C}		Houston Aeros
(Canada)	Joe Daley^{A}		Winnipeg Jets
Defencemen
(Canada)	Doug Barrie		Edmonton Oilers
(Canada)	John Schella^{C}		Houston Aeros
(Canada)	Barry Long^{A}		Edmonton Oilers
(Canada)	Gerry Odrowski^{C}		Phoenix Roadrunners
(Denmark)	Poul Popiel^{B}		Houston Aeros
(Sweden)	Lars-Erik Sjoberg^{A}		Winnipeg Jets
(Canada)	Al Hamilton^{B‡}		Edmonton Oilers
Forwards
(Canada)	Bobby Hull^{A}	LW	Winnipeg Jets
(Canada)	Gordie Howe^{B}	RW	Houston Aeros
(United States)	Mark Howe^{C}	LW	Houston Aeros
(Canada)	Andre Lacroix^{B}	C	San Diego Mariners
(Sweden)	Ulf Nilsson^{C}	C	Winnipeg Jets
(Canada)	Larry Lund^{A}	C	Houston Aeros
(Canada)	Andre Hinse^{B}	LW	Houston Aeros
(Canada)	Frank Hughes^{A}	RW	Houston Aeros
(Canada)	Danny Lawson	RW	Vancouver Blazers
(Canada)	Ted Taylor	LW	Houston Aeros
(Canada)	Fran Huck	C	Minnesota Fighting Saints
(Canada)	Mike Walton^{C‡}	RW	Minnesota Fighting Saints

- ^{A} Voted to first team.
- ^{B} Voted to second team.
- ^{C} Voted to third team.
- ^{‡} Unable to participate due to injury.

G = Goaltender; D = Defenceman; C = Center; LW = Left Wing; RW = Right Wing

== Game summary ==
#	Score	Team	Goalscorer (Assist(s))	Time
First period
1	0-1	West	Mark Howe (Gordie Howe, Lacroix)	7:08
2	0-2	West	Hinse (Lund, Hughes)	8:18
3	1-2	East	Tardif (Houle, Selwood)	13:32
4	2-2	East	Houle (Pleau, Dorey)	17:37
Penalties : none
Second period
5	2-3	West	Hull (Lawson)	4:23
6	2-4	West	Hinse (Hughes, Odrowski)	6:35
7	2-5	West	Taylor (Lacroix, Schella)	10:07
8	2-6	West	Gordie Howe (Lacroix, Mark Howe)	11:53
9	3-6	East	Houle (Selwood, Dorey)	14:32
Penalties : none
Third period
10	4-6	East	Bernier (Tardif, Houle)	11:20
Penalties : none

Goaltenders :

- East: Cheevers (20 minutes, 7 shots, 2 goals against), Brown (20 minutes, 11 shots, 4 goals against), Smith (20 minutes, 12 shots, 0 goals against).
- West: Daley (20 minutes, 11 shots, 2 goals against), Rutledge (20 minutes, 9 shots, 1 goal against), McLeod (20 minutes, 8 shots, 1 goal against).

Shots on goal :

- East (28) 11 - 9 - 8
- West (30) 7 - 11 - 12

Referee :

Linesmen :

== See also ==
- 1974–75 WHA season
