= List of World Hockey Association arenas =

The following is a list of World Hockey Association (WHA) arenas.

34 total venues hosted a regular season game in the league from 1972 to 1979. Just three venues hosted 200 games over the seven WHA seasons: Winnipeg Arena, which hosted 279, Colisée de Québec, which hosted 278, and Edmonton Coliseum, which hosted 201. The Randhurst Twin Ice Arena hosted playoff games in the 1974 WHA playoffs for the Chicago Cougars due to scheduling conflicts but never hosted a regular season game.

== Arenas ==
| Arena | Location | Team | Capacity | Opened | WHA tenure |
|---|---|---|---|---|---|
| Arizona Veterans Memorial Coliseum | Phoenix, Arizona | Phoenix Roadrunners | 13,730 | 1964 | 1974–1977 |
| Baltimore Civic Center | Baltimore, Maryland | Baltimore Blades | 10,582 | 1962 | 1974–1975 |
| Boston Arena | Boston, Massachusetts | New England Whalers | 4,666 | 1910 | 1972–1973 |
| Boston Garden | Boston, Massachusetts | New England Whalers | 14,448 | 1928 | 1973–1974 |
| Stampede Corral | Calgary, Alberta | Calgary Cowboys | 7,475 | 1950 | 1975–1977 |
| Cherry Hill Arena | Cherry Hill, New Jersey | Jersey Knights | 4,416 | 1959 | 1973–1974 |
| Cleveland Arena | Cleveland, Ohio | Cleveland Crusaders | 9,900 | 1937 | 1972–1974 |
| Cobo Hall | Detroit, Michigan | Michigan Stags | 12,000 | 1960 | 1974–1975 |
| Eastern States Coliseum | West Springfield, Massachusetts | New England Whalers | 6,000 | 1916 | 1974–1975 |
| Edmonton Coliseum | Edmonton, Alberta | Edmonton Oilers | 17,100 | 1974 | 1974–1979 |
| Edmonton Gardens | Edmonton, Alberta | Edmonton Oilers | 5,200 | 1913 | 1972–1974 |
| Hartford Civic Center | Hartford, Connecticut | New England Whalers | 10,507 | 1975 | 1975–1978 |
| International Amphitheatre | Chicago, Illinois | Chicago Cougars | 9,000 | 1934 | 1972–1975 |
| Birmingham–Jefferson Civic Center | Birmingham, Alabama | Birmingham Bulls | 17,654 | 1976 | 1976–1978 |
| Colisée de Québec | Quebec City, Quebec | Quebec Nordiques | 15,176 | 1949 | 1972–1979 |
| Long Beach Arena | Long Beach, California | Los Angeles Sharks | 12,500 | 1962 | 1972–1974 |
| Los Angeles Memorial Sports Arena | Los Angeles, California | Los Angeles Sharks | 14,546 | 1959 | 1972–1974 |
| Madison Square Garden | New York City, New York | New York Golden Blades | 18,006 | 1968 | 1972–1973 |
| Maple Leaf Gardens | Toronto, Ontario | Toronto Toros | 16,316 | 1931 | 1974–1976 |
| Market Square Arena | Indianapolis, Indiana | Indianapolis Racers | 15,993 | 1974 | 1974–1978 |
| McNichols Sports Arena | Denver, Colorado | Denver Spurs | 15,900 | 1975 | 1975 |
| Ottawa Civic Centre | Ottawa, Ontario | Ottawa Nationals; Ottawa Civics | 10,500 | 1967 | 1972–1973; January 2–15, 1976 |
| Pacific Coliseum | Vancouver, British Columbia | Vancouver Blazers | 16,281 | 1968 | 1973–1975 |
| Philadelphia Civic Center | Philadelphia, Pennsylvania | Philadelphia Blazers | 9,600 | 1931 | 1972–1973 |
| Randhurst Twin Ice Arena | Mount Prospect, Illinois | Chicago Cougars | 2,000 | 1974 | April 28–May 15, 1974 |
| Richfield Coliseum | Richfield, Ohio | Cleveland Crusaders | 18,544 | 1974 | 1974–1976 |
| Riverfront Coliseum | Cincinnati, Ohio | Cincinnati Stingers | 14,453 | 1975 | 1975–1979 |
| Saint Paul Auditorium | Saint Paul, Minnesota | Minnesota Fighting Saints | 5,000 | 1932 | 1972 |
| St. Paul Civic Center | Saint Paul, Minnesota | Minnesota Fighting Saints | 16,000 | 1973 | 1973–1977 |
| Sam Houston Coliseum | Houston, Texas | Houston Aeros | 9,200 | 1937 | 1972–1975 |
| San Diego Sports Arena | San Diego, California | San Diego Mariners | 12,920 | 1966 | 1974–1977 |
| Springfield Civic Center | Springfield, Massachusetts | New England Whalers | 6,800 | 1972 | 1978–1979 |
| The Summit | Houston, Texas | Houston Aeros | 14,906 | 1975 | 1975–1978 |
| Varsity Arena | Toronto, Ontario | Toronto Toros | 4,116 | 1926 | 1973–1974 |
| Winnipeg Arena | Winnipeg, Manitoba | Winnipeg Jets | 10,100 | 1955 | 1972–1979 |
