= Bob Sicinski =

Canadian ice hockey player

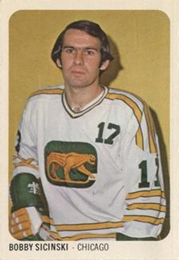
- Born: November 13, 1946 (age 79) Brampton, Ontario, Canada
- Height: 5 ft 11 in (180 cm)
- Weight: 174 lb (79 kg; 12 st 6 lb)
- Position: Centre
- Shot: Left
- Played for: Chicago Cougars; Indianapolis Racers Greensboro Generals
- Playing career: 1967–1978

Bob Sicinski (born November 13, 1946, in Brampton, Ontario) is a retired professional ice hockey player who played 353 games in the World Hockey Association. He played with the Chicago Cougars and Indianapolis Racers. Sicinski played in the minor leagues for nearly a decade before taking a chance on the upstart WHA in 1972 with the Chicago Cougars. In late December, he was put on a line with wingers Jan Popiel and Rosaire Paiement by head coach Marcel Pronovost Sicinski had a peak year with 88 points in 77 games on 25 goals and 63 assists. The following year saw him score just 40 points but he contributed 14 points (third most for Cougars players and 13th overall) in the surprising 1974 WHA playoffs run of 18 games, with two of his goals being game-winners as the Cougars made it all the way to the Avco Cup Final. He moved over to the Indianapolis Racers, where his point totals went from 53 in his first year there to just 36 in 60 games. He then played in the CHL, PHL, and the Ontario Major Junior Hockey League before retiring in 1978.

== Career statistics ==
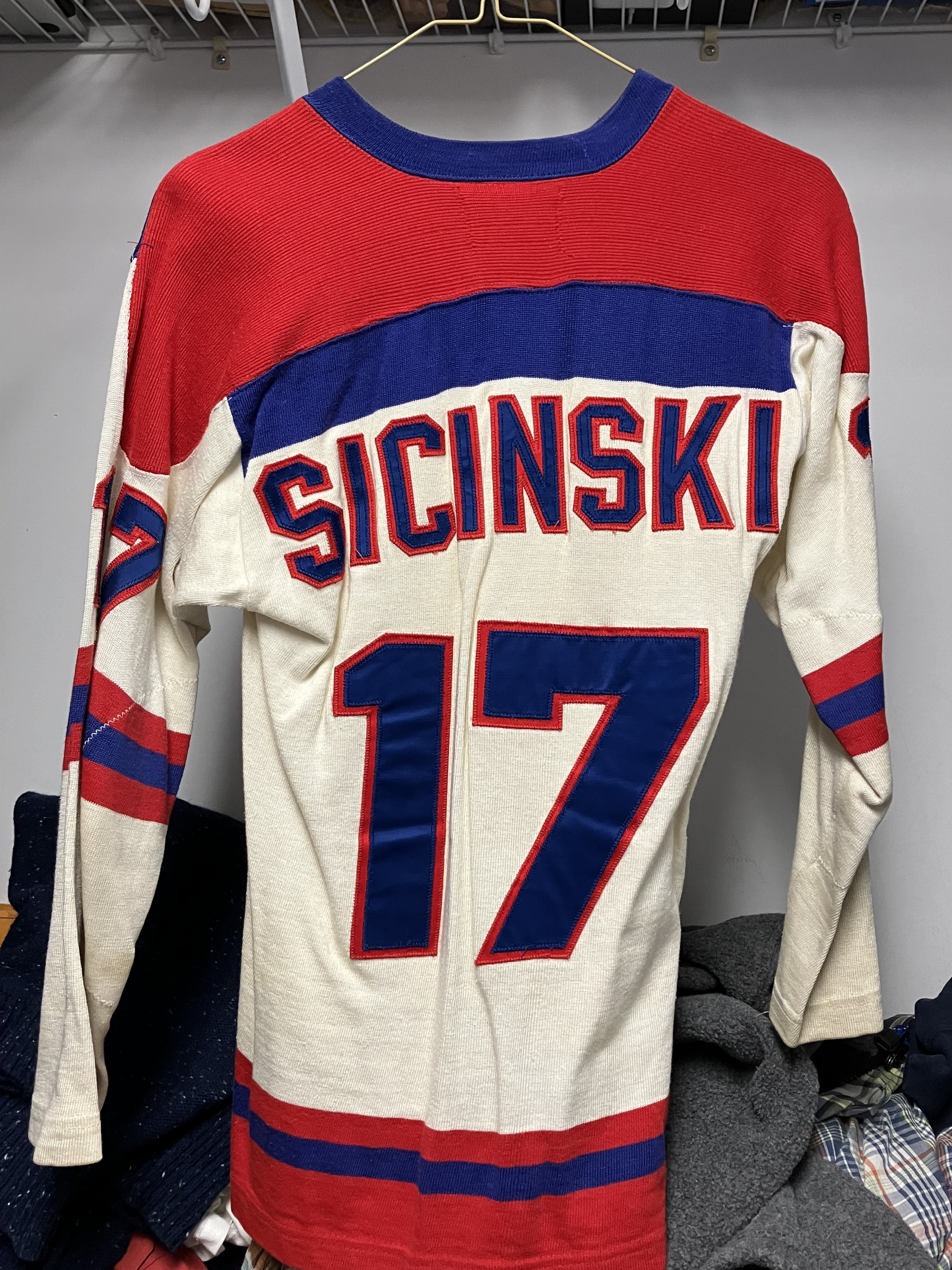
Fan jersey of Sicinski's #17

			Regular season					Playoffs
Season	Team	League	GP	G	A	Pts	PIM	GP	G	A	Pts	PIM
1964–65	St. Catharines Black Hawks	OHA	47	10	26	36	0	—	—	—	—	—
1965–66	St. Catharines Black Hawks	OHA	48	17	32	49	24	—	—	—	—	—
1966–67	St. Catharines Black Hawks	OHA	46	10	25	35	12	—	—	—	—	—
1967–68	Greensboro Generals	EHL	69	30	63	93	4	11	3	6	9	2
1968–69	Greensboro Generals	EHL	72	38	72	110	10	8	0	4	4	0
1969–70	Dallas Black Hawks	CHL	3	1	3	4	0	—	—	—	—	—
1969–70	Greensboro Generals	EHL	72	40	75	115	30	16	3	2	5	7
1970–71	Dallas Black Hawks	CHL	20	3	5	8	4	—	—	—	—	—
1971–72	Dallas Black Hawks	CHL	67	23	61	84	14	12	1	9	10	4
1972–73	Chicago Cougars	WHA	77	25	63	88	18	—	—	—	—	—
1973–74	Chicago Cougars	WHA	69	11	29	40	8	18	6	8	14	0
1974–75	Indianapolis Racers	WHA	77	19	34	53	12	—	—	—	—	—
1975–76	Indianapolis Racers	WHA	70	9	34	43	4	7	0	0	0	2
1976–77	Indianapolis Racers	WHA	60	12	24	36	14	9	0	3	3	4
1976–77	Oklahoma City Blazers	CHL	12	8	14	22	6	—	—	—	—	—
1977–78	San Diego Mariners	PHL	42	17	36	53	12	—	—	—	—	—
1977–78	Brantford Alexanders	OHL Sr.	3	6	8	14	12	—	—	—	—	—
WHA totals			353	76	184	260	56	34	6	11	17	6
