= Rich Dupras =

Canadian ice hockey player

- Born: January 1, 1950 (age 76) Montreal, Quebec, Canada
- Height: 6 ft 0 in (183 cm)
- Weight: 185 lb (84 kg; 13 st 3 lb)
- Position: Centre
- Shot: Left
- Played for: WHA; Toronto Toros; NAHL; Mohawk Valley Comets; Maine Nordiques
- NHL draft: Undrafted
- Playing career: 1973–1975

Richard Dupras (born January 1, 1950) is a Canadian former professional ice hockey player.

During the 1973–74 season, Dupras played two games in the World Hockey Association with the Toronto Toros. As a youth, he played in the 1961 and 1962 Quebec International Pee-Wee Hockey Tournaments with LaSalle.

== Career statistics ==
=== Regular season and playoffs ===
			Regular season					Playoffs
Season	Team	League	GP	G	A	Pts	PIM	GP	G	A	Pts	PIM
1969–70	Verdun Maple Leafs	QMJHL	5	1	1	2	16	6	0	3	3	0
1970–71	Trois–Rivieres University	CIAU	18	23	19	42	0	—	—	—	—	—
1971–72	Trois–Rivieres University	CIAU	20	17	23	40	0	—	—	—	—	—
1972–73	Trois–Rivieres University	CIAU	19	12	13	25	0	—	—	—	—	—
1973–74	Mohawk Valley Comets	NAHL	63	24	24	48	21	—	—	—	—	—
1973–74	Toronto Toros	WHA	2	0	0	0	0	—	—	—	—	—
1974–75	Mohawk Valley Comets	NAHL	16	5	7	12	12	—	—	—	—	—
1974–75	Maine Nordiques	NAHL	21	6	8	14	8	—	—	—	—	—
WHA totals			2	0	0	0	2	—	—	—	—	—
