= Okanagan Hockey Group =

- Type: Private sport school
- Founded: 1963; 63 years ago
- Founder: Larry Lund
- Headquarters: Penticton, British Columbia, Canada
- Area served: North America; Europe
- Key people: Andy Oakes (President); J.P. Kaumeyer (chairman)

Okanagan Hockey School is a series of instructional ice hockey camps for youth players. The original school was founded in Penticton, British Columbia in 1963 by hockey players Larry Lund, Larry Hale and Bill Dineen. On-ice training was held at the Summerland Arena, moving to Penticton in 1966. In the 1970s, the school expanded with a dorm for out-of-town students at Queen's Park Elementary School.

Okanagan Hockey School is the longest continuously-running hockey school in the world. In 2004, Lund sold the organization to a group headed by Andy Oakes and former NHL players Alan Kerr and Jeff Finley.

In Canada, Okanagan Hockey Camps currently operate in six locations, including Penticton and Kelowna, British Columbia, and St. Pölten, Austria, as well as a partnership with the Edmonton Oilers.

Okanagan Hockey Camps has programs designed for male and female players of all levels from 5–20 years old. There are regular and elite-level programs offered for players and goaltenders, including specialized programs for skating, power skating, shooting, and defense.

The Okanagan Hockey Group also operates the Okanagan Hockey Academy, a year-round program based out of Penticton that plays in the Canadian Sport School Hockey League. The OHA is a public-private partnership with Penticton Secondary School operated out of the South Okanagan Events Centre.

In addition to Okanagan Hockey Camps and Okanagan Hockey Academy, Okanagan Hockey Group is also in a partnership with the Western Hockey League in their WHL Combines program.
