= Frank Blum =

Canadian ice hockey player

- Born: June 29, 1952 (age 73) Sudbury, Ontario, Canada
- Height: 6 ft 1 in (185 cm)
- Weight: 180 lb (82 kg; 12 st 12 lb)
- Position: Goaltender
- Caught: Right
- Played for: WHA; Ottawa Nationals; Toronto Toros; Winnipeg Jets
- NHL draft: 82nd overall, 1972; Atlanta Flames
- Playing career: 1972–1975

Frank Blum (born May 3, 1952) is a Canadian former professional ice hockey goaltender. He was selected by the Atlanta Flames in the tenth round (82nd overall) of the 1972 NHL Amateur Draft.

Between 1972 and 1974, Blum played 9 regular season and playoff games in the World Hockey Association with the Ottawa Nationals, Toronto Toros, and Winnipeg Jets.

== Career statistics ==
=== Regular season and playoffs ===
| | | | Regular season | | | | | | | | | Playoffs |
| Season | Team | League | GP | W | L | T | MIN | GA | SO | GAA | SV% | GP | W | L | MIN | GA | SO | GAA | SV% |
|---|---|---|---|---|---|---|---|---|---|---|---|---|---|---|---|---|---|---|---|
| 1969–70 | Sarnia Bees | WJBHL | Statistics Unavailable |
| 1971–72 | Sarnia Bees | SOJHL | – | – | – | – | 2291 | 136 | 0 | 3.56 | – | – | – | – | – | – | – | – | – |
| 1972–73 | Clinton Comets | EHL | 16 | – | – | – | – | 71 | 1 | 4.35 | – | – | – | – | – | – | – | – | – |
| 1972–73 | Ottawa Nationals | WHA | 2 | 0 | 0 | 0 | 28 | 3 | 0 | 6.42 | .824 | – | – | – | – | – | – | – | – |
| 1973–74 | Mohawk Valley Comets | NAHL | 24 | – | – | – | 1350 | 110 | 1 | 4.89 | – | – | – | – | – | – | – | – | – |
| 1973–74 | Toronto Toros | WHA | 5 | 1 | 0 | 0 | 131 | 5 | 0 | 2.29 | .924 | – | – | – | – | – | – | – | – |
| 1973–74 | Winnipeg Jets | WHA | – | – | – | – | – | – | – | – | – | 2 | – | – | – | – | – | – | – |
| 1974–75 | Port Huron Flags | IHL | 11 | – | – | – | 475 | 36 | 0 | 4.55 | – | – | – | – | – | – | – | – | – |
| WHA totals | | | 7 | 1 | 0 | 0 | 159 | 8 | 0 | 3.02 | .904 | 2 | — | — | — | — | — | — | — |
