= Jack Gibson (ice hockey, born 1948) =

Canadian ice hockey player

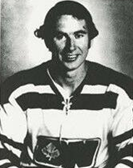
- Gibson in 1972 photo
- Born: August 18, 1948 (age 77) Picton, Ontario, Canada
- Height: 6 ft 0 in (183 cm)
- Weight: 185 lb (84 kg; 13 st 3 lb)
- Position: Left wing
- Shot: Left
- Played for: Ottawa Nationals; Toronto Toros
- WHA draft: Undrafted
- Playing career: 1972–1976

Jack Gibson (born August 18, 1948) is a Canadian former professional ice hockey left winger.

== Early life ==
Gibson was born in Picton, Ontario. He played junior hockey with the Moose Jaw Canucks and was a member of the Alberta Golden Bears at the University of Alberta.

== Career ==
Gibson played 122 games in the World Hockey Association. He was a member of the Ottawa Nationals and Toronto Toros.

== Career statistics ==
=== Regular season and playoffs ===
| | | | Regular season | | | | | Playoffs |
| Season | Team | League | GP | G | A | Pts | PIM | GP | G | A | Pts | PIM |
|---|---|---|---|---|---|---|---|---|---|---|---|---|
| 1966–67 | Moose Jaw Canucks | CMJHL | 28 | 3 | 5 | 8 | 0 | — | — | — | — | — |
| 1968–69 | University of Alberta | CIAU | –– | 15 | 26 | 41 | 34 | — | — | — | — | — |
| 1970–71 | University of Alberta | CIAU | –– | 25 | 24 | 49 | 0 | — | — | — | — | — |
| 1971–72 | University of Alberta | CIAU | Statistics Unavailable |
| 1972–73 | Clinton Comets | EHL | 15 | 14 | 11 | 25 | 7 | — | — | — | — | — |
| 1972–73 | Ottawa Nationals | WHA | 59 | 22 | 13 | 35 | 48 | 1 | 1 | 0 | 1 | 0 |
| 1973–74 | Toronto Toros | WHA | 61 | 16 | 9 | 25 | 60 | 12 | 1 | 3 | 4 | 11 |
| 1974–75 | Mohawk Valley Comets | NAHL | 21 | 15 | 12 | 27 | 30 | 4 | 1 | 0 | 1 | 31 |
| 1974–75 | Toronto Toros | WHA | — | — | — | — | — | 1 | 0 | 0 | 0 | 0 |
| 1975–76 | Toronto Toros | WHA | 2 | 0 | 0 | 0 | 0 | — | — | — | — | — |
| WHA totals | | | 122 | 38 | 22 | 60 | 108 | 14 | 2 | 3 | 5 | 11 |
