= Rick Sentes =

Canadian ice hockey player

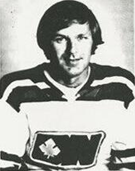
- Sentest in 1972 headshot
- Born: January 10, 1947 (age 79) Regina, Saskatchewan, Canada
- Height: 6 ft 0 in (183 cm)
- Weight: 184 lb (83 kg; 13 st 2 lb)
- Position: Right wing
- Shot: Left
- Played for: Ottawa Nationals; Toronto Toros; San Diego Mariners; Calgary Cowboys
- Playing career: 1967–1977

Rick Sentes (born January 10, 1947) is a retired professional ice hockey player who played 337 games in the World Hockey Association (WHA). He played with the Ottawa Nationals, Toronto Toros, San Diego Mariners, and Calgary Cowboys.

== Awards ==
- CMJHL First All-Star Team – 1967

== Career statistics ==
=== Regular season and playoffs ===
| | | | Regular season | | | | | Playoffs |
| Season | Team | League | GP | G | A | Pts | PIM | GP | G | A | Pts | PIM |
|---|---|---|---|---|---|---|---|---|---|---|---|---|
| 1963–64 | Regina Pats | SJHL | 61 | 8 | 11 | 19 | 23 | — | — | — | — | — |
| 1964–65 | Regina Pats | SJHL | 7 | 1 | 0 | 1 | 2 | — | — | — | — | — |
| 1965–66 | Regina Pats | SJHL | Statistics Unavailable |
| 1966–67 | Regina Pats | CMJHL | 56 | 66 | 61 | 127 | 100 | — | — | — | — | — |
| 1967–68 | Houston Apollos | CHL | 69 | 22 | 33 | 55 | 58 | — | — | — | — | — |
| 1968–69 | Cleveland Barons | AHL | 67 | 16 | 13 | 29 | 40 | 2 | 1 | 0 | 1 | 0 |
| 1968–69 | Vancouver Canucks | WHL | 8 | 0 | 0 | 0 | 4 | — | — | — | — | — |
| 1969–70 | Iowa Stars | CHL | 42 | 14 | 10 | 24 | 40 | — | — | — | — | — |
| 1969–70 | Denver Spurs | WHL | 15 | 7 | 5 | 12 | 8 | — | — | — | — | — |
| 1970–71 | Denver Spurs | WHL | 69 | 20 | 27 | 47 | 102 | 5 | 0 | 2 | 2 | 12 |
| 1971–72 | Tidewater Wings | AHL | 74 | 32 | 21 | 53 | 104 | — | — | — | — | — |
| 1972–73 | Ottawa Nationals | WHA | 74 | 22 | 19 | 41 | 78 | 5 | 3 | 1 | 4 | 2 |
| 1973–74 | Toronto Toros | WHA | 64 | 26 | 34 | 60 | 46 | 12 | 7 | 4 | 11 | 19 |
| 1974–75 | San Diego Mariners | WHA | 74 | 44 | 41 | 85 | 52 | 10 | 0 | 2 | 2 | 0 |
| 1975–76 | Calgary Cowboys | WHA | 72 | 25 | 24 | 49 | 33 | 8 | 0 | 1 | 1 | 8 |
| 1976–77 | Calgary Cowboys | WHA | 29 | 10 | 14 | 24 | 8 | — | — | — | — | — |
| 1976–77 | San Diego Mariners | WHA | 24 | 10 | 11 | 21 | 16 | 5 | 4 | 0 | 4 | 12 |
| WHA totals | | | 337 | 137 | 143 | 280 | 233 | 40 | 14 | 8 | 22 | 41 |
