= Brian Gibbons (ice hockey, born 1947) =

Canadian ice hockey player (1947–2025)

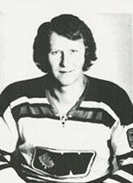
- Gibbons in 1972 photo
- Born: July 7, 1947 St. John's, Dominion of Newfoundland
- Died: January 14, 2025 (aged 77)
- Height: 6 ft 3 in (191 cm)
- Weight: 190 lb (86 kg; 13 st 8 lb)
- Position: Defence
- Shot: Left
- Played for: Ottawa Nationals; Toronto Toros; Denver Spurs; Ottawa Civics
- Playing career: 1969–1976

Brian Joseph Gibbons (July 7, 1947 – January 14, 2025) was a Canadian professional ice hockey defenceman who played in 226 games in the World Hockey Association. He died on January 14, 2025, at the age of 77.

== Career statistics ==
=== Regular season and playoffs ===
			Regular season					Playoffs
Season	Team	League	GP	G	A	Pts	PIM	GP	G	A	Pts	PIM
1965–66	Hamilton Red Wings	OHA	32	7	7	14	49	—	—	—	—	—
1966–67	Hamilton Red Wings	OHA	48	3	20	23	65	—	—	—	—	—
1967–68	Hamilton Red Wings	OHA	41	5	23	28	64	—	—	—	—	—
1968–69	San Diego Gulls	WHL	12	0	0	0	4	—	—	—	—	—
1968–69	Denver Spurs	WHL	35	3	15	18	28	—	—	—	—	—
1968–69	Fort Worth Wings	CHL	15	0	5	5	10	—	—	—	—	—
1969–70	Fort Worth Wings	CHL	31	1	4	5	56	—	—	—	—	—
1969–70	Cleveland–Spfld.	AHL	25	3	4	7	32	14	0	1	1	13
1970–71	Springfield Kings	AHL	70	5	2	7	115	12	0	0	0	17
1971–72	Springfield Kings	AHL	65	2	12	14	111	3	0	0	0	4
1972–73	Ottawa Nationals	WHA	73	7	35	42	62	5	1	2	3	12
1973–74	Toronto Toros	WHA	78	4	31	35	84	12	2	5	7	10
1974–75	Toronto Toros	WHA	73	4	22	26	105	5	0	0	0	4
1975–76	Denver Spurs/Ottawa Civics	WHA	2	0	0	0	0	—	—	—	—	—
1975–76	Tucson Mavericks	CHL	14	0	4	4	37	—	—	—	—	—
WHA totals			226	15	88	103	251	22	3	7	10	26
