= Tom Martin (ice hockey, born 1947) =

Canadian ice hockey player (born 1947)

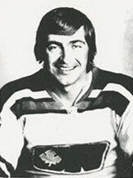
- Martin in 1972 photo
- Born: October 16, 1947 (age 78) Toronto, Ontario, Canada
- Height: 5 ft 9 in (175 cm)
- Weight: 170 lb (77 kg; 12 st 2 lb)
- Position: Wing
- Shot: Right
- Played for: Toronto Maple Leafs; Ottawa Nationals; Toronto Toros; Modo Hockey
- NHL draft: 5th overall, 1964; Toronto Maple Leafs
- Playing career: 1968–1979

Thomas Raymond Martin (born October 16, 1947) is a Canadian retired professional ice hockey player. Martin played in three National Hockey League (NHL) games with the Toronto Maple Leafs during the 1967–68 season. He also played in over 200 WHA games with the Ottawa Nationals and Toronto Toros between 1972 and 1975.

== Career statistics ==
=== Regular season and playoffs ===
			Regular season					Playoffs
Season	Team	League	GP	G	A	Pts	PIM	GP	G	A	Pts	PIM
1964–65	North York Maple Leafs	MetJBHL	36	29	33	62	—	—	—	—	—	—
1965–66	Toronto Marlboros	OHA	48	19	21	40	23	11	2	2	4	2
1966–67	Toronto Marlboros	OHA	44	18	28	46	29	17	12	12	24	4
1966–67	Toronto Marlboros	M-Cup	—	—	—	—	—	9	9	6	15	9
1967–68	Toronto Maple Leafs	NHL	3	1	0	1	0	—	—	—	—	—
1967–68	Toronto Marlboros	OHA	54	37	48	85	43	5	3	3	6	16
1967–68	Tulsa Oilers	CHL	—	—	—	—	—	1	0	0	0	0
1968–69	Tulsa Oilers	CHL	4	2	0	2	4	—	—	—	—	—
1968–69	Ottawa Nationals	OHA Sr	6	3	8	11	8	—	—	—	—	—
1969–70	Tulsa Oilers	CHL	65	21	35	56	26	6	5	3	8	4
1970–71	Fort Worth Wings	CHL	59	23	35	58	18	—	—	—	—	—
1971–72	Fort Worth Wings	CHL	31	14	21	35	17	—	—	—	—	—
1971–72	Tidewater Wings	AHL	42	16	13	29	23	—	—	—	—	—
1972–73	Ottawa Nationals	WHA	74	19	27	46	27	5	0	5	5	2
1973–74	Toronto Toros	WHA	74	25	32	57	14	12	7	3	10	2
1974–75	Toronto Toros	WHA	64	15	17	32	18	5	1	5	6	0
1975–76	IFK Luleå	SWE-2	20	23	19	42	—	—	—	—	—	—
1976–77	Modo AIK	SWE	33	9	8	17	46	2	0	1	1	4
1977–78	IK Viking	SWE-3	18	21	14	35	—	—	—	—	—	—
1978–79	IK Viking	SWE-3	23	11	17	28	91	—	—	—	—	—
WHA totals			212	59	76	135	59	22	8	13	21	4
NHL totals			3	1	0	1	0	—	—	—	—	—

Preceded by Walt McKechnie	Toronto Maple Leafs first-round draft pick 1964	Succeeded by John Wright
