= Bob Leduc =

Canadian ice hockey player

Bob LeDuc
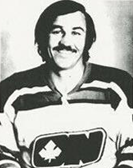
- Leduc in 1972 photo
- Born: May 24, 1944 (age 82) Sudbury, Ontario, Canada
- Height: 5 ft 10 in (178 cm)
- Weight: 185 lb (84 kg; 13 st 3 lb)
- Position: Center/left wing
- Shot: Left
- Played for: Ottawa Nationals; Toronto Toros
- Playing career: 1972–1975

Bob Leduc (born May 24, 1944) is a former professional ice hockey player who played 158 games in the World Hockey Association. He played with the Ottawa Nationals and Toronto Toros.

Leduc played junior hockey with the Sudbury Wolves. He played seven seasons in the American Hockey League with the Providence Reds before getting called up to the World Hockey Association. He briefly served as player-coach while with the Toros. From 1975-77, he spent two additional seasons in the minors with the Maine Nordiques. Leduc later returned to Rhode Island and worked in the Reds' front office while also investing in real estate.

== Career statistics ==
=== Regular season and playoffs ===
			Regular season					Playoffs
Season	Team	League	GP	G	A	Pts	PIM	GP	G	A	Pts	PIM
1963–64	Sudbury Cub–Wolves	NOJHL	––	50	45	95	70	—	—	—	—	—
1964–65	Providence Reds	AHL	8	1	0	1	2	—	—	—	—	—
1964–65	New York Rovers	EHL	58	28	33	61	67	—	—	—	—	—
1965–66	Providence Reds	AHL	72	11	23	34	102	—	—	—	—	—
1966–67	Providence Reds	AHL	59	16	18	34	53	—	—	—	—	—
1967–68	Providence Reds	AHL	67	15	28	43	38	8	3	4	7	11
1968–69	Providence Reds	AHL	72	14	28	42	73	9	2	3	5	21
1969–70	Providence Reds	AHL	72	32	33	65	34	—	—	—	—	—
1970–71	Providence Reds	AHL	70	27	25	52	81	10	1	3	4	21
1971–72	Providence Reds	AHL	76	13	30	43	46	5	0	1	1	2
1972–73	Ottawa Nationals	WHA	78	22	33	55	71	5	0	2	2	4
1973–74	Toronto Toros	WHA	61	22	29	51	29	12	4	6	10	42
1974–75	Toronto Toros	WHA	19	3	4	7	9	—	—	—	—	—
1975–76	Maine Nordiques	NAHL	67	23	43	66	63	4	2	2	4	12
1976–77	Maine Nordiques	NAHL	25	4	10	14	4	12	2	7	9	6
WHA totals			158	47	66	113	109	17	4	8	12	46

== Coaching record ==
=== World Hockey Association ===
Team	Year	Regular season						Postseason			
Team	Year	G	W	L	T	Pts	Finish	W	L	Win %	Result
TOR	1974–75	37	20	16	1	(88)	2nd in Canadian	2	4	.333	Lost in quarterfinals (SDM)
WHA totals		37	20	16	1	41		2	4	.333	1 playoff appearance

=== North American Hockey League ===
Team	Year	Regular season						Postseason			
Team	Year	G	W	L	T	Pts	Finish	W	L	Win %	Result
Maine Nordiques	1975-76	74	18	55	1	37	4th in East	1	3	.333	Lost in division semifinals (BEA)
NAHL totals	1975-1976	74	18	55	1	37		1	3	.250	
