= Ron Ward (ice hockey) =

Canadian ice hockey player

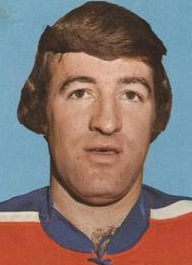
- Born: September 12, 1944 (age 80); Cornwall, Ontario, Canada
- Height: 5 ft 11 in (180 cm)
- Weight: 175 lb (79 kg; 12 st 7 lb)
- Position: Forward
- Shot: Right
- Played for: Toronto Maple Leafs; Vancouver Canucks; New York Raiders; Vancouver Blazers; Los Angeles Sharks; Cleveland Crusaders; Calgary Cowboys; Minnesota Fighting Saints; Winnipeg Jets
- Playing career: 1970–1977

Ronald Leon "Magic" Ward (born September 12, 1944) is a former Canadian ice hockey player who played center for the Toronto Maple Leafs and Vancouver Canucks of the National Hockey League from 1970 to 1972. He then switched to the fledgling World Hockey Association, playing for the New York Raiders in the 1972–73 season. This would be his most productive season, as he amassed 51 goals and 67 assists for 118 points. Throughout the rest of his WHA career he went on to play for the Vancouver Blazers, Los Angeles Sharks, Cleveland Crusaders, Calgary Cowboys, Minnesota Fighting Saints, and ending with the Winnipeg Jets in 1976–77.

== Career statistics ==
=== Regular season and playoffs ===
			Regular season					Playoffs
Season	Team	League	GP	G	A	Pts	PIM	GP	G	A	Pts	PIM
1963–64	Cornwall Royals	CJHL	—	—	—	—	—	—	—	—	—	—
1964–65	Cornwall Royals	CJHL	36	29	31	60	—	—	—	—	—	—
1965–66	Tulsa Oilers	CHL	69	6	22	28	37	7	1	2	3	9
1966–67	Tulsa Oilers	CHL	42	12	15	27	46	—	—	—	—	—
1967–68	Phoenix Roadrunners	WHL	1	0	1	1	0	—	—	—	—	—
1967–68	Tulsa Oilers	CHL	67	31	54	85	30	11	5	5	10	8
1968–69	Rochester Americans	AHL	73	35	43	78	18	—	—	—	—	—
1969–70	Toronto Maple Leafs	NHL	18	0	1	1	2	—	—	—	—	—
1969–70	Phoenix Roadrunners	WHL	22	7	9	16	12	—	—	—	—	—
1969–70	Tulsa Oilers	CHL	22	7	17	24	15	—	—	—	—	—
1970–71	Rochester Americans	AHL	69	23	16	39	33	—	—	—	—	—
1971–72	Vancouver Canucks	NHL	71	2	4	6	4	—	—	—	—	—
1972–73	New York Raiders	WHA	77	51	67	118	28	—	—	—	—	—
1973–74	Vancouver Blazers	WHA	7	0	2	2	2	—	—	—	—	—
1973–74	Los Angeles Sharks	WHA	40	14	19	33	16	—	—	—	—	—
1973–74	Cleveland Crusaders	WHA	23	19	7	26	7	5	3	0	3	2
1974–75	Cleveland Crusaders	WHA	73	30	32	62	18	5	0	2	2	2
1975–76	Cleveland Crusaders	WHA	75	32	50	82	24	3	0	2	2	0
1976–77	Minnesota Fighting Saints	WHA	41	15	21	36	6	—	—	—	—	—
1976–77	Winnipeg Jets	WHA	14	4	7	11	2	—	—	—	—	—
1976–77	Calgary Cowboys	WHA	9	5	5	10	0	—	—	—	—	—
WHA totals			359	170	210	380	103	13	3	4	7	4
NHL totals			89	2	5	7	6	—	—	—	—	—
