= Gord Labossiere =

Canadian ice hockey player

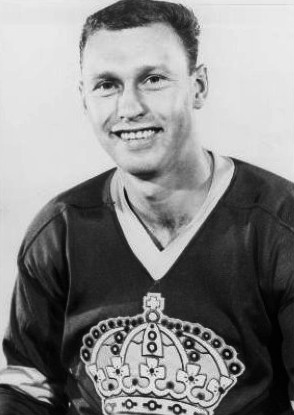
- Labossiere as a member of the Los Angeles Kings
- Born: January 2, 1940 (age 86) St. Boniface, Manitoba, Canada
- Height: 6 ft 1 in (185 cm)
- Weight: 185 lb (84 kg; 13 st 3 lb)
- Position: Centre
- Shot: Right
- Played for: New York Rangers; Los Angeles Kings; Minnesota North Stars; Houston Aeros
- Playing career: 1958–1976

Gordon William Labossiere (French pronunciation: [laˈbasi.eɪ]; born January 2, 1940) is a Canadian former professional ice hockey player who played 215 games in the National Hockey League between 1963 and 1971 and 301 games in the World Hockey Association between 1972 and 1976.

== Career statistics ==
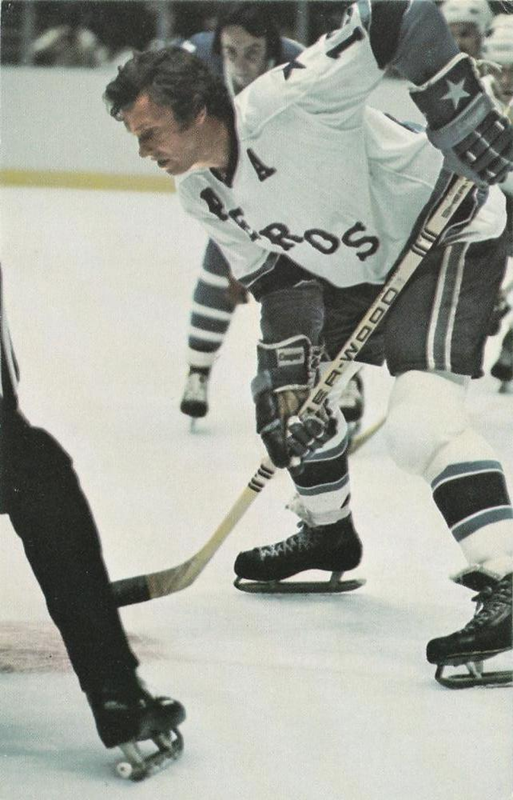
Labossiere with the Houston Aeros, c. 1975

=== Regular season and playoffs ===
			Regular season					Playoffs
Season	Team	League	GP	G	A	Pts	PIM	GP	G	A	Pts	PIM
1956–57	Winnipeg Rangers	MJHL	29	20	13	33	57	4	1	0	1	6
1957–58	Brandon Rangers	MJHL	30	44	35	79	97	—	—	—	—	—
1957–58	Saskatoon Regals/St. Paul Saints	WHL	2	0	0	0	2	—	—	—	—	—
1947–58	St. Boniface Canadiens	M-Cup	—	—	—	—	—	11	10	5	15	38
1958–59	Saskatoon Quakers	WHL	64	25	19	44	83	—	—	—	—	—
1959–60	Edmonton Flyers	WHL	65	20	18	38	72	4	0	1	1	4
1960–61	Edmonton Flyers	WHL	20	5	11	16	20	—	—	—	—	—
1960–61	Winnipeg Warriors	WHL	43	17	17	34	62	—	—	—	—	—
1961–62	Sudbury Wolves	EPHL	30	10	11	21	44	—	—	—	—	—
1961–62	Seattle Totems	WHL	21	4	4	8	12	2	0	0	0	0
1962–63	Sudbury Wolves	EPHL	72	34	67	101	94	8	4	5	9	23
1963–64	New York Rangers	NHL	15	0	0	0	12	—	—	—	—	—
1963–64	Baltimore Clippers	AHL	48	17	17	34	20	—	—	—	—	—
1964–65	New York Rangers	NHL	1	0	0	0	0	—	—	—	—	—
1964–65	Baltimore Clippers	AHL	72	38	41	79	72	5	1	1	2	6
1965–66	Quebec Aces	AHL	63	31	51	82	137	6	0	1	1	14
1966–67	Quebec Aces	AHL	72	40	55	95	71	5	2	3	5	18
1967–68	Los Angeles Kings	NHL	68	13	27	40	31	7	2	3	5	24
1968–69	Los Angeles Kings	NHL	48	10	18	28	12	—	—	—	—	—
1968–69	Springfield Kings	AHL	25	13	23	36	40	—	—	—	—	—
1969–70	Springfield Kings	AHL	60	30	59	89	94	14	2	5	7	21
1970–71	Los Angeles Kings	NHL	45	11	10	21	16	—	—	—	—	—
1970–71	Minnesota North Stars	NHL	29	8	4	12	4	3	0	0	0	4
1971–72	Minnesota North Stars	NHL	9	2	3	5	0	—	—	—	—	—
1971–72	Cleveland Barons	AHL	66	40	45	85	71	6	4	2	6	4
1972–73	Houston Aeros	WHA	77	36	60	96	56	6	1	4	5	8
1973–74	Houston Aeros	WHA	67	19	36	55	30	14	7	9	16	20
1974–75	Houston Aeros	WHA	76	23	34	57	40	13	6	7	13	4
1975–76	Houston Aeros	WHA	80	24	32	56	18	17	2	8	10	14
WHA totals			300	102	162	264	144	50	16	28	44	46
NHL totals			215	44	62	106	75	10	2	3	5	28

== Awards and achievements ==
- MJHL Scoring Champion (1958)
- MJHL Goal Leader (1958)
- MJHL First Team Allstar (1958)
- MJHL MVP (1958)
- EPHL Scoring Champion (1963)
- EPHL First All-Star Team (1963)
- AHL First All-Star Team (1967)
- John B. Sollenberger Trophy Winner (1967)
- AHL Second All-Star Team (1970)
- Avco Cup (WHA) Championships (1974 & 1975)
- Honoured Member of the Manitoba Hockey Hall of Fame
