= Jan Popiel =

Danish-Canadian ice hockey player

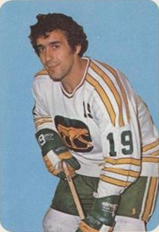
- Born: October 9, 1947 (age 78) Virum, Denmark
- Height: 5 ft 9 in (175 cm)
- Weight: 180 lb (82 kg; 12 st 12 lb)
- Position: Left wing
- Played for: Chicago Cougars; Denver Spurs; Houston Aeros; Phoenix Roadrunners
- NHL draft: 10th overall, 1964; Chicago Black Hawks
- Playing career: 1968–1977

Jan Popiel (born October 9, 1947) is a Danish-Canadian former professional ice hockey player who played 296 games in the World Hockey Association. He played for the Chicago Cougars, Denver Spurs, Houston Aeros and Phoenix Roadrunners. He is the younger brother of former NHL player Poul Popiel.

Popiel was drafted 10th overall in the 1964 NHL entry draft by the Chicago Black Hawks making him the highest drafted Danish-born player in NHL history until Mikkel Bødker was drafted in 2008 as number 8. Popiel, however, was raised in Canada (his family moved to St. Catharines, Ontario in 1951 when he was a child) and is a Canadian citizen. Popiel featured in the Avco World Trophy final with the Cougars in the 1974 WHA playoffs and the Aeros in the 1976 WHA playoffs, both resulting in losses.

Popiel also played professional lacrosse, scoring five goals in six games for the Montreal Canadiens of the National Lacrosse Association of 1968.

== Career statistics ==
=== Regular season and playoffs ===
			Regular season					Playoffs
Season	Team	League	GP	G	A	Pts	PIM	GP	G	A	Pts	PIM
1966–67	St. Catharines Black Hawks	OHA	40	5	20 2	5	46	—	—	—	—	—
1968–69	Salem Rebels	EHL	49	11	29	40	64	—	—	—	—	—
1969–70	Greensboro Generals	EHL	74	32	37	69	98	16	8	8	16	35
1970–71	Tulsa Oilers	CHL	67	22	26	48	83	—	—	—	—	—
1971–72	Tulsa Oilers	CHL	63	24	37	61	109	13	6	7	13	17
1972–73	Chicago Cougars	WHA	76	31	34	65	77	—	—	—	—	—
1973–74	Chicago Cougars	WHA	63	22	17	39	36	18	8	5	13	12
1974–75	Chicago Cougars	WHA	60	18	22	40	74	—	—	—	—	—
1975–76	Denver Spurs/Ottawa Civics	WHA	2	0	0	0	2	—	—	—	—	—
1975–76	Houston Aeros	WHA	67	4	7	11	59	8	1	1	2	4
1976–77	Phoenix Roadrunners	WHA	28	3	2	5	8	—	—	—	—	—
1976–77	Oklahoma City Blazers	CHL	32	23	16	39	33	—	—	—	—	—
WHA totals			296	78	82	160	256	26	9	6	15	16
