= Jim Sherrit =

Scottish ice hockey player

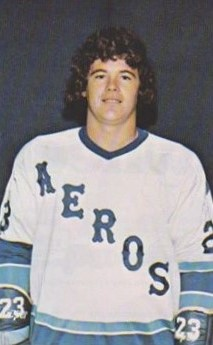
- Born: September 29, 1948 (age 77) Glasgow, Scotland, UK
- Height: 5 ft 7 in (170 cm)
- Weight: 165 lb (75 kg; 11 st 11 lb)
- Position: Centre
- Shot: Right
- Played for: Houston Aeros (WHA); Denver Spurs (WHA); Ottawa Civics (WHA)
- NHL draft: Undrafted
- Playing career: 1973–1976

Jim Sherrit (born September 29, 1948) was a Scottish-born Canadian former professional ice hockey center who played three seasons in the World Hockey Association (WHA).

He was born in the maternity wing of Lennox Castle in Glasgow, Scotland, and immigrated with his family to North Bay, Ontario when he was three. He is a former professional ice hockey player who played 193 games in the World Hockey Association, winning two AVCO cups with Houston Aeros. in 1973-74 and 1974–75. During his tenure in Houston, he centered Gordie Howe and Mark Howe and was jokingly referred to as the "Who between the Howes". In addition to Houston he played for the Denver Spurs and Ottawa Civics. Growing up in North Bay, Sherrit played hockey, football, soccer, rugby, baseball and participated in track and field and gymnastics, all at the highest levels. In 1988, he was inducted into the North Bay Sports Hall of Fame.

== Career statistics ==
=== Regular season and playoffs ===
			Regular season					Playoffs
Season	Team	League	GP	G	A	Pts	PIM	GP	G	A	Pts	PIM
1972–73	Cape Cod Cubs	EHL	76	42	81	123	49	8	2	6	8	0
1973–74	Houston Aeros	WHA	76	30	28	58	18	14	5	7	12	2
1974–75	Houston Aeros	WHA	77	22	25	47	25	13	3	3	6	6
1975–76	Erie Blades	NAHL	22	8	28	36	18	5	2	4	6	0
1975–76	Tucson Mavericks	CHL	2	0	0	0	2	—	—	—	—	—
1975–76	Denver Spurs/Ottawa Civics	WHA	40	11	19	30	16	—	—	—	—	—
1976–77	Erie Blades	NAHL	42	14	22	36	14	—	—	—	—	—
1976–77	Philadelphia Firebirds	NAHL	30	10	13	23	6	4	0	3	3	0
WHA totals			193	63	72	135	59	27	8	10	18	8
