= Bill Prentice =

Canadian ice hockey player

- Born: June 10, 1950 (age 74); Lindsay, Ontario, Canada
- Height: 6 ft 0 in (183 cm)
- Weight: 190 lb (86 kg; 13 st 8 lb)
- Position: Defence
- Shot: Right
- Played for: Edmonton Oilers; Quebec Nordiques; Houston Aeros; Indianapolis Racers
- Playing career: 1967–1980

William John Prentice (born June 10, 1950) is a Canadian retired professional ice hockey defenceman. He played 158 games in the World Hockey Association with the Edmonton Oilers, Quebec Nordiques, Houston Aeros, and Indianapolis Racers.

== Career statistics ==
			Regular season					Playoffs
Season	Team	League	GP	G	A	Pts	PIM	GP	G	A	Pts	PIM
1970–71	Michigan Technological University	NCAA	29	3	5	8	39	—	—	—	—	—
1971–72	Michigan Technological University	NCAA	29	2	7	9	69	—	—	—	—	—
1972–73	Michigan Technological University	NCAA	34	6	12	18	78	—	—	—	—	—
1972–73	Houston Aeros	WHA	3	0	1	1	0	—	—	—	—	—
1973–74	Houston Aeros	WHA	55	1	2	3	35	10	0	0	0	5
1973–74	Jacksonville Barons	AHL	14	0	5	5	28	—	—	—	—	—
1974–75	Tulsa Oilers	CHL	42	1	7	8	85	2	0	0	0	2
1974–75	Houston Aeros	WHA	17	0	3	3	19	4	0	0	0	0
1975–76	Indianapolis Racers	WHA	38	4	2	6	92	—	—	—	—	—
1975–76	Quebec Nordiques	WHA	21	2	5	7	89	5	0	0	0	17
1976–77	Edmonton Oilers	WHA	3	0	0	0	2	—	—	—	—	—
1976–77	Maine Nordiques	NAHL-Sr.	27	5	2	7	43	—	—	—	—	—
1977–78	Indianapolis Racers	WHA	21	1	1	2	28	—	—	—	—	—
1977–78	Hampton Gulls	AHL	25	0	1	1	15	—	—	—	—	—
1978–79	Nova Scotia Voyageurs	AHL	64	2	5	7	87	—	—	—	—	—
1978–79	Philadelphia Firebirds	AHL	18	2	3	5	14	—	—	—	—	—
1979–80	Saginaw Gears	IHL	11	1	3	4	24	—	—	—	—	—
WHA totals			158	8	14	22	265	19	0	0	0	22
