= Bob Liddington =

Canadian ice hockey player

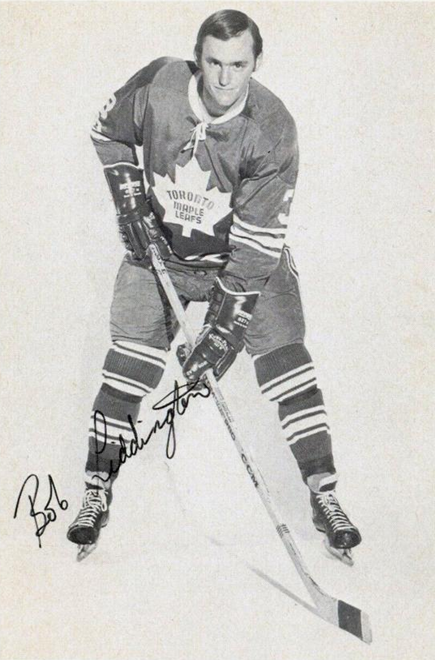
- Liddington in 1970 photo
- Born: September 15, 1948 (age 77) Calgary, Alberta, Canada
- Height: 6 ft 0 in (183 cm)
- Weight: 175 lb (79 kg; 12 st 7 lb)
- Position: Left wing
- Shot: Left
- Played for: Toronto Maple Leafs; Chicago Cougars; Houston Aeros; Denver Spurs; Ottawa Civics; Phoenix Roadrunners
- Playing career: 1966–1979

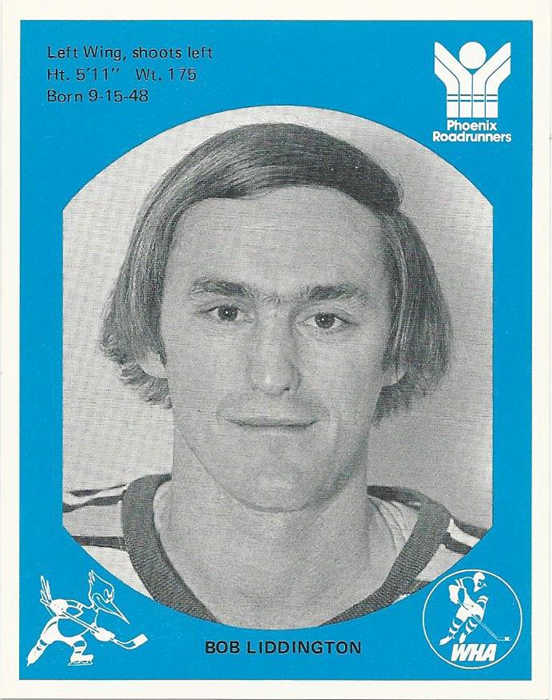
1976-77 card of Liddington for Phoenix Roadrunners of WHA

Robert Allen Liddington (born September 15, 1948) is a Canadian former professional ice hockey player who played 11 games in the National Hockey League and 348 games in the World Hockey Association between 1970 and 1977. He played for the Toronto Maple Leafs, Chicago Cougars, Houston Aeros, Denver Spurs, Ottawa Civics, and Phoenix Roadrunners.

== Career statistics ==
=== Regular season and playoffs ===
			Regular season					Playoffs
Season	Team	League	GP	G	A	Pts	PIM	GP	G	A	Pts	PIM
1966–67	Calgary Buffaloes	CMJHL	27	6	4	10	15	—	—	—	—	—
1966–67	Calgary Spurs	WCSHL	—	—	—	—	—	1	0	0	0	)
1967–68	Calgary Centennials	WCJHL	59	36	32	68	24	—	—	—	—	—
1968–69	Calgary Centennials	WCJHL	60	58	33	91	26	11	7	3	10	0
1979–70	Tulsa Oilers	CHL	68	22	17	39	33	3	0	0	0	0
1970–71	Toronto Maple Leafs	NHL	11	0	1	1	2	—	—	—	—	—
1970–71	Tulsa Oilers	CHL	61	18	21	39	55	—	—	—	—	—
1971–72	Phoenix Roadrunners	WHL	72	22	19	41	58	6	2	4	6	4
1972–73	Chicago Cougars	WHA	78	20	11	31	24	—	—	—	—	—
1973–74	Chicago Cougars	WHA	73	26	21	47	20	18	6	5	11	11
1974–75	Chicago Cougars	WHA	78	23	18	41	27	—	—	—	—	—
1975–76	Denver Spurs/Ottawa Civics	WHA	35	7	8	15	14	—	—	—	—	—
1975–76	Houston Aeros	WHA	2	0	0	0	2	—	—	—	—	—
1975–76	Tucson Mavericks	CHL	23	12	12	24	20	—	—	—	—	—
1976–77	Phoenix Roadrunners	WHA	80	20	24	44	28	—	—	—	—	—
1977–78	Binghamton Dusters	AHL	11	3	2	5	2	—	—	—	—	—
1977–78	Long Beach Sharks	PHL	33	15	24	39	6	—	—	—	—	—
1978–79	Phoenix Roadrunners	PHL	60	34	20	54	16	—	—	—	—	—
WHA totals			346	96	82	176	115	18	6	5	11	11
NHL totals			11	0	1	1	2	—	—	—	—	—
