= Gary Williamson (ice hockey) =

Canadian ice hockey player

- Born: May 25, 1950 (age 75) Montreal, Quebec, Canada
- Height: 5 ft 10 in (178 cm)
- Weight: 175 lb (79 kg; 12 st 7 lb)
- Position: Forward
- Shot: Left
- Played for: WHA; Houston Aeros; SHL; Greensboro Generals; Macon Whoopees
- NHL draft: Undrafted
- Playing career: 1973–1974

Gary Albert Williamson (born May 25, 1950) is a Canadian former professional ice hockey player.

During the 1973–74 season, Williamson played nine games in the World Hockey Association with the Houston Aeros.

== Career statistics ==
=== Regular season and playoffs ===
			Regular season					Playoffs
Season	Team	League	GP	G	A	Pts	PIM	GP	G	A	Pts	PIM
1966–67	Verdun Maple Leafs	MMJHL	4	1	0	1	0	—	—	—	—	—
1970–71	Providence College	ECAC	28	23	25	48	40	—	—	—	—	—
1971–72	Providence College	ECAC	Statistics Unavailable
1972–73	Providence College	ECAC	25	17	15	32	36	—	—	—	—	—
1973–74	Macon Whoopees	SHL	58	25	33	58	38	—	—	—	—	—
1973–74	Greensboro Generals	SHL	7	3	0	3	0	6	2	1	3	0
1973–74	Houston Aeros	WHA	9	2	6	8	0	12	0	0	0	0
WHA totals			9	2	6	8	0	12	0	0	0	0
