= Randhurst Ice Arena =

Indoor arena in Mount Prospect, Illinois

Coordinates: 42°4′52.6″N 87°55′55.0″W

Randhurst Ice Arena was an indoor arena located in Mount Prospect, Illinois. The arena, which sat about 2,000 people, was the part-time home of the Chicago Cougars of the World Hockey Association from 1974 to 1975. While the Cougars won their first round series in 1974 at their venue International Amphitheatre, they could not have the privilege to retain the services of the Amphitheatre due to other events. As such, the Cougars were forced to use the arena for both the Semifinal round and the Avco Cup Final. Randhurst Ice Arena was built in early 1974 next to Randhurst Mall. Today a Home Depot sits on the ice arena's former location.

It was also the site for music concerts.
