= Frank Hughes (ice hockey) =

Canadian ice hockey player

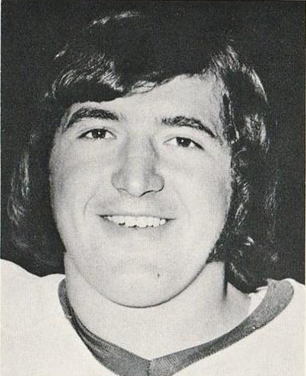
- Hughes with the Aeros, c. 1975
- Born: October 1, 1949 (age 76) Fernie, British Columbia, Canada
- Height: 5 ft 10 in (178 cm)
- Weight: 180 lb (82 kg; 12 st 12 lb)
- Position: Left wing
- Shot: Right
- Played for: California Golden Seals; Houston Aeros; Phoenix Roadrunners
- NHL draft: 43rd overall, 1969; Toronto Maple Leafs
- Playing career: 1969–1979

Frank Hughes (born October 1, 1949) is a Canadian former professional ice hockey winger who played 392 games in the World Hockey Association and five games in the National Hockey League between 1971 and 1978. He was a member of the Houston Aeros, California Golden Seals, and Phoenix Roadrunners. With the Aeros, he won the Avco Cup twice.

== Career statistics ==
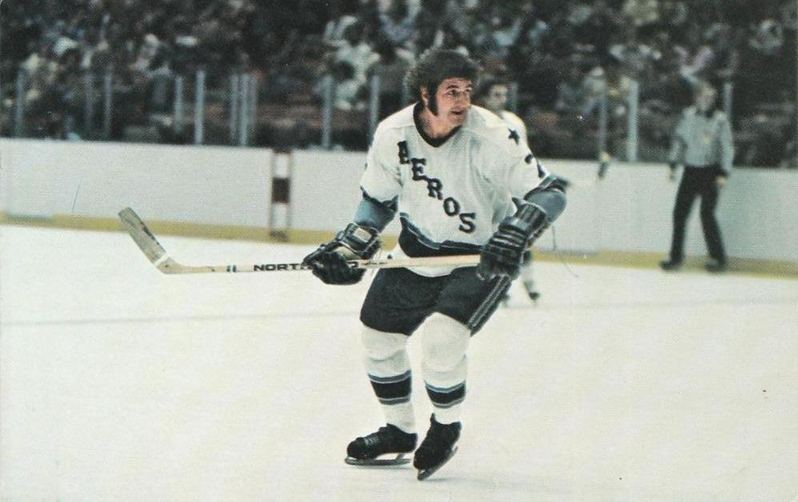
Hughes in action for 1975 game

=== Regular season and playoffs ===
			Regular season					Playoffs
Season	Team	League	GP	G	A	Pts	PIM	GP	G	A	Pts	PIM
1967–68	Edmonton Oil Kings	WCHL	—	—	—	—	—	1	0	0	0	0
1968–69	Edmonton Oil Kings	WCHL	50	18	10	28	10	17	10	7	17	—
1969–70	Phoenix Roadrunners	WHL	71	26	42	68	44	—	—	—	—	—
1970–71	Phoenix Roadrunners	WHL	68	30	38	68	67	10	4	4	8	14
1971–72	California Golden Seals	NHL	5	0	0	0	0	—	—	—	—	—
1971–72	Phoenix Roadrunners	WHL	53	34	28	62	41	6	2	3	5	13
1972–73	Houston Aeros	WHA	76	22	19	41	41	10	4	4	8	2
1973–74	Houston Aeros	WHA	73	42	42	84	47	14	9	5	14	9
1974–75	Houston Aeros	WHA	76	48	35	83	35	13	6	6	12	2
1975–76	Houston Aeros	WHA	80	31	45	76	26	17	5	1	6	20
1976–77	Houston Aeros	WHA	27	3	8	11	2	—	—	—	—	—
1976–77	Phoenix Roadrunners	WHA	48	24	29	53	20	—	—	—	—	—
1977–78	Houston Aeros	WHA	11	3	2	5	2	—	—	—	—	—
1977–78	Phoenix Roadrunners	PHL	40	33	41	74	44	—	—	—	—	—
1978–79	Tucson Rustlers	PHL	58	35	49	84	32	—	—	—	—	—
WHA totals			391	173	180	353	173	54	24	16	40	33
NHL totals			5	0	0	0	0	—	—	—	—	—
