= Don McLeod =

Canadian ice hockey player (1946–2015)

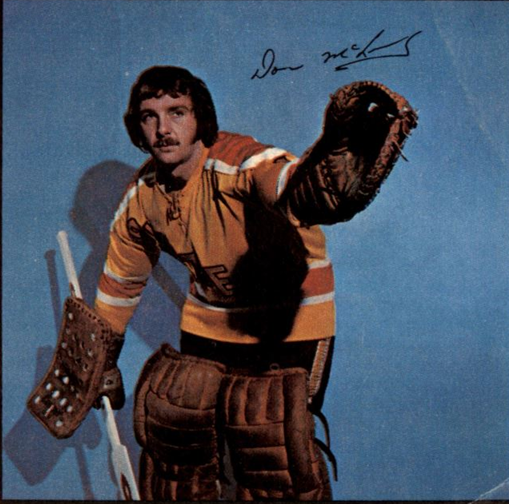
- Born: August 24, 1946 Trail, British Columbia, Canada
- Died: March 11, 2015 (aged 68) Port Coquitlam, British Columbia, Canada
- Height: 6 ft 0 in (183 cm)
- Weight: 190 lb (86 kg; 13 st 8 lb)
- Position: Goaltender
- Caught: Left
- Played for: Detroit Red Wings; Philadelphia Flyers; Houston Aeros; Vancouver Blazers; Calgary Cowboys; Quebec Nordiques; Edmonton Oilers
- National team: Canada
- Playing career: 1967–1978

Donald Martin "Smokey" McLeod (August 24, 1946 – March 11, 2015) was a Canadian professional ice hockey goaltender who played briefly in the National Hockey League and six full seasons in the World Hockey Association between 1970 and 1978.

== Playing career ==
McLeod's professional career began with several teams in the minor Central Professional Hockey League and American Hockey League, before being called up for two stints in the NHL, totaling 18 games, with the Detroit Red Wings and Philadelphia Flyers over the 1970–71 and 1971–72 seasons.

With the formation of the WHA in 1972, McLeod was signed by the Houston Aeros, where he played two seasons. The 1973-74 season was his finest year. He was the second winner of the Ben Hatskin Trophy as the WHA's top goalie and was named to the First All-Star team. To top off his best professional season, the Aeros won the Avco Trophy as WHA playoff champions. McLeod was also chosen to represent Canada as a backup goaltender to Gerry Cheevers in the 1974 Summit Series against the Soviet Union in September 1974. In that series, Don got the start in Game 3 as Cheevers sat out the third game since his father was gravely ill in hospital. For the 1974–75 season, McLeod signed with the Vancouver Blazers where he appeared in a league-record 72 games. McLeod followed the franchise to Calgary and for the next two seasons was the Calgary Cowboys main goalie. When that franchise folded in 1977, McLeod was drafted by the Quebec Nordiques, where he played in only seven games before being dealt to the Edmonton Oilers where he finished out the 1977–78 season and his professional career.

Nicknamed "Smokey" for his propensity for cigarettes, McLeod was noted for his quirks as a player: he once rejected a contract deal because it was one penny shorter than what he desired: $100,000, he once signed a contract with the Quebec Nordiques only to find so much trouble with the French-centric region that he was traded away after seven games, and he was among the first goalies to use a curved blade on his goalie stick.

Among the WHA statistical leaders, McLeod was 2nd in games played for a goalie (332), 4th in wins (155), and 5th in shutouts (11) while being third of just six goalies to record a goals against average (250 games played), doing so with a 3.326 GAA. He was one of only 11 goaltenders to record at least one shutout in the playoffs. He became a salesman after his playing days ended, working between Calgary and Cranbrook. He lived in the Vancouver suburb of Port Coquitlam prior to suffering a fatal heart attack in 2015, dying at the age of 68; he was survived by his two daughters.

== Career statistics ==
=== Regular season and playoffs ===
			Regular season									Playoffs
Season	Team	League	GP	W	L	T	MIN	GA	SO	GAA	SV%	GP	W	L	T	MIN	GA	SO	GAA	SV%
1963–64	Trail Smoke Eaters	WIHL	8	0	7	0	502	55	0	6.57	—	—	—	—	—	—	—	—	—	—
1964–65	Edmonton Oil Kings	ASHL	—	—	—	—	—	—	—	—	—	—	—	—	—	—	—	—	—	—
1965–66	Edmonton Oil Kings	ASHL	29	—	—	—	1740	115	0	3.97	—	9	6	3	0	520	27	0	3.12	—
1965–66	Edmonton Oil Kings	M-Cup	—	—	—	—	—	—	—	—	—	19	15	4	0	1100	49	3	2.67	—
1966–67	Edmonton Oil Kings	CMJHL	38	—	—	—	2280	126	1	3.32	—	9	2	3	4	522	34	2	3.91	—
1967–68	Québec Aces	AHL	2	0	1	0	80	10	0	7.50	—	—	—	—	—	—	—	—	—	—
1967–68	Fort Worth Wings	CPHL	17	5	6	5	1020	51	0	3.00	—	—	—	—	—	—	—	—	—	—
1967–68	Springfield Kings	AHL	9	6	2	1	540	27	0	3.00	—	4	1	3	—	240	13	0	3.25	—
1968–69	Baltimore Clippers	AHL	7	2	3	1	379	28	0	4.43	—	—	—	—	—	—	—	—	—	—
1968–69	Springfield Kings	AHL	34	15	13	2	1833	105	0	3.44	—	—	—	—	—	—	—	—	—	—
1969–70	Fort Worth Wings	CHL	37	18	11	8	2200	109	1	2.97	—	3	0	3	—	176	11	0	3.75	—
1970–71	Detroit Red Wings	NHL	14	3	7	0	697	60	0	5.17	.852	—	—	—	—	—	—	—	—	—
1970–71	Fort Worth Wings	CHL	36	—	—	—	2124	90	2	2.57	—	3	—	—	—	207	15	0	4.35	—
1971–72	Philadelphia Flyers	NHL	4	0	3	1	181	14	0	4.65	.872	—	—	—	—	—	—	—	—	—
1971–72	Richmond Robins	AHL	5	1	3	1	300	14	0	2.80	—	—	—	—	—	—	—	—	—	—
1971–72	Providence Reds	AHL	19	6	8	4	1083	66	0	2.73	—	—	—	—	—	—	—	—	—	—
1972–73	Houston Aeros	WHA	41	19	20	1	2410	145	1	3.61	.884	3	0	3	—	178	8	0	2.70	.895
1973–74	Houston Aeros	WHA	49	33	13	3	2971	127	3	2.56	.911	14	12	2	—	842	35	0	2.49	.909
1974–75	Vancouver Blazers	WHA	72	33	35	2	4184	233	1	3.34	.890	—	—	—	—	—	—	—	—	—
1975–76	Calgary Cowboys	WHA	63	30	27	3	3534	206	1	3.50	.871	10	5	5	—	559	37	0	3.97	—
1976–77	Calgary Cowboys	WHA	67	25	34	5	3701	210	3	3.40	.879	—	—	—	—	—	—	—	—	—
1977–78	Quebec Nordiques	WHA	7	2	4	0	403	28	0	4.17	.870	—	—	—	—	—	—	—	—	—
1977–78	Edmonton Oilers	WHA	33	15	10	1	1723	102	2	3.55	.864	4	1	3	—	207	16	1	4.64	—
NHL totals			18	3	10	1	878	74	0	5.06	.856	—	—	—	—	—	—	—	—	—
WHA totals			332	155	123	15	18,926	1049	11	3.33	.884	31	18	13	—	1806	96	1	3.19	—

=== International ===
Year	Team	Event	GP	W	L	T	MIN	GA	SO	GAA	SV%
1974	Canada	SS	1	0	1	0	58:56	8	0	8.14	.794
