= Wayne Dillon =

Canadian ice hockey player (born 1955)

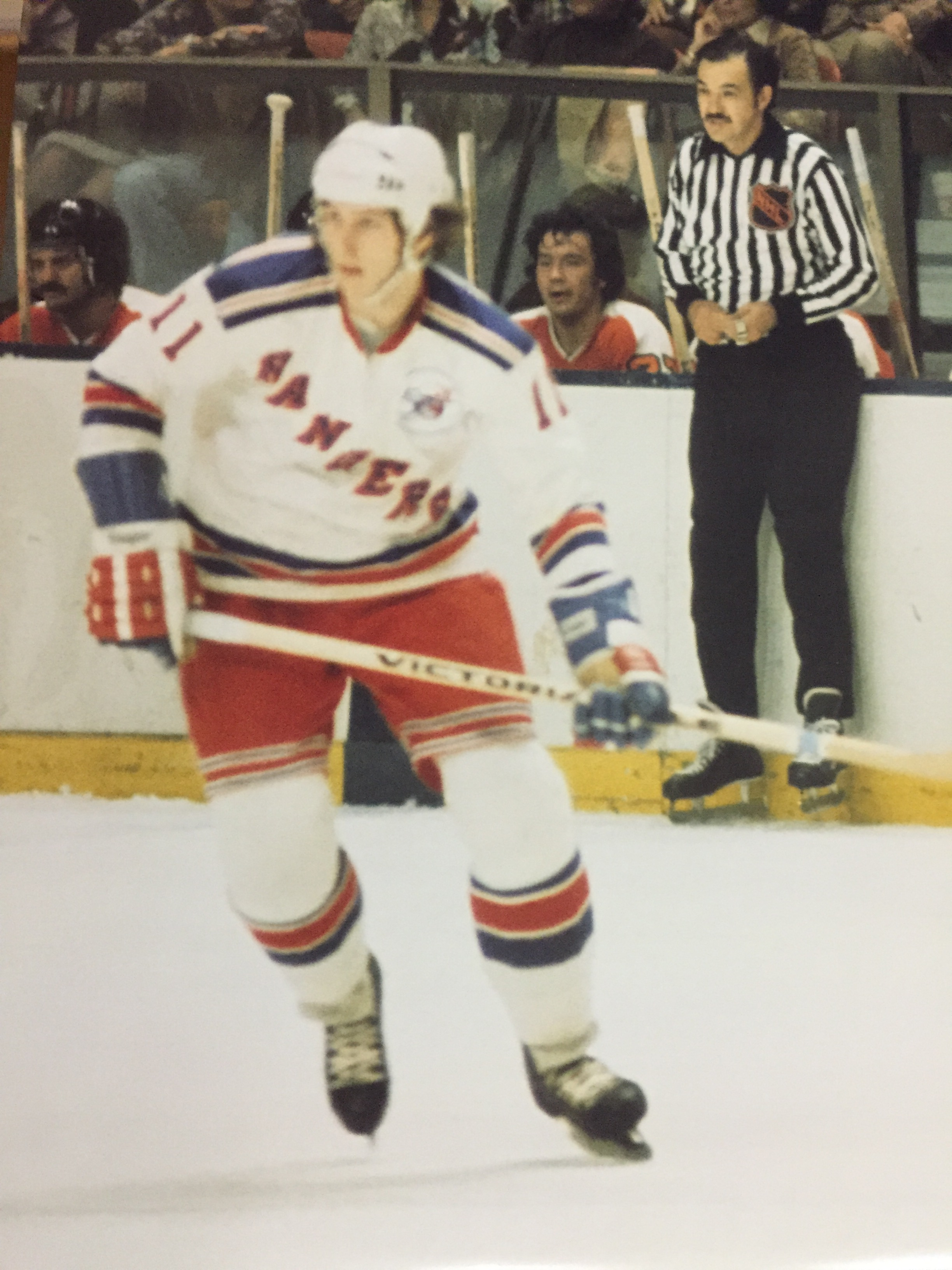
- Born: May 25, 1955 (age 71) Toronto, Ontario, Canada
- Height: 6 ft 0 in (183 cm)
- Weight: 185 lb (84 kg; 13 st 3 lb)
- Position: Centre
- Shot: Left
- Played for: Toronto Toros; New York Rangers; Birmingham Bulls; Winnipeg Jets
- National team: Canada
- NHL draft: 12th overall, 1975; New York Rangers
- Playing career: 1973–1982

Gerald Wayne Dillon (born May 25, 1955) is a Canadian former professional ice hockey player. He played in the World Hockey Association with the Toronto Toros and Birmingham Bulls, and in the National Hockey League (NHL) with the New York Rangers and Winnipeg Jets between 1973 and 1980.

== Playing career ==
As a youth, Dillon played in the 1967 Quebec International Pee-Wee Hockey Tournament with the Scarboro Lions minor ice hockey team.

Dillon spent four years in the National Hockey League (NHL) and was known as a top scorer in the World Hockey Association (WHA) and junior leagues. He was chosen 12th overall by the New York Rangers in the 1975 NHL amateur draft after he had already played two seasons in the WHA for the Toronto Toros, recording 95 points in 1974-75. He had been one of the first underage players to sign with a WHA team prior to becoming eligible for the NHL amateur draft. With the Rangers, he recorded 44 points in his rookie season in 1975-76. Dillon was forced into earlier retirement due to hindered performance as a result from injuries.

His brother, Gary Dillon, played briefly in the NHL as a centre for the Colorado Rockies. Following 229 NHL games Dillon recorded a total of 43 goals and 66 assists for 109 points.

== Career statistics ==
			Regular season					Playoffs
Season	Team	League	GP	G	A	Pts	PIM	GP	G	A	Pts	PIM
1970–71	Markham Waxers	MetJHL	—	—	—	—	—	—	—	—	—	—
1971–72	Toronto Marlboros	OHA	56	14	14	28	8	10	0	1	1	0
1972–73	Toronto Marlboros	OHA	59	47	60	107	25	10	2	10	12	10
1972–73	Toronto Marlboros	MC	—	—	—	—	—	3	1	3	4	0
1973–74	Toronto Toros	WHA	71	30	35	65	13	12	5	6	11	9
1974–75	Toronto Toros	WHA	77	29	66	95	22	6	4	4	8	4
1975–76	New York Rangers	NHL	79	21	24	45	10	—	—	—	—	—
1976–77	New York Rangers	NHL	78	17	29	46	33	—	—	—	—	—
1977–78	New York Rangers	NHL	59	5	13	18	15	3	0	1	1	0
1977–78	New Haven Nighthawks	AHL	3	2	0	2	0	—	—	—	—	—
1978–79	Birmingham Bulls	WHA	64	12	27	39	43	—	—	—	—	—
1979–80	Winnipeg Jets	NHL	13	0	0	0	2	—	—	—	—	—
1979–80	Canadian National Team	Intl	4	1	0	1	4	—	—	—	—	—
1980–81	SC Rapperswil–Jona	NDA	—	—	—	—	—	—	—	—	—	—
1981–82	Fredericton Express	AHL	37	7	13	20	25	—	—	—	—	—
WHA totals			212	71	128	199	78	18	9	10	19	13
NHL totals			229	43	66	109	60	3	0	1	1	0

Preceded by Dave Maloney	New York Rangers first-round draft pick 1975	Succeeded by Don Murdoch
