= André Hinse =

Canadian ice hockey player

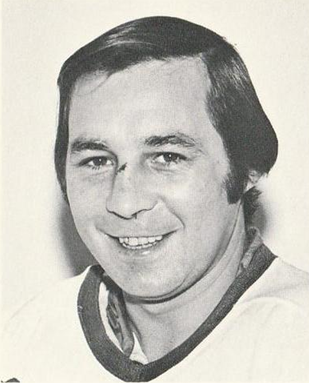
- Born: April 19, 1945 (age 80) Trois-Rivières, Quebec, Canada
- Height: 5 ft 9 in (175 cm)
- Weight: 175 lb (79 kg; 12 st 7 lb)
- Position: Left wing
- Shot: Left
- Played for: Toronto Maple Leafs; Phoenix Roadrunners; Houston Aeros
- Playing career: 1963–1977

Joseph Charles André Hinse (born April 19, 1945) is a Canadian retired professional ice hockey player who played four games in the National Hockey League and 256 games in the World Hockey Association between 1968 and 1977. He played for the Toronto Maple Leafs, Phoenix Roadrunners and Houston Aeros.

After playing junior hockey in his native Quebec, Hinse was invited to the Maples Leafs training camp in 1965 before he was sent to the Charlotte Checkers of the Eastern Hockey League.

== Career statistics ==
=== Regular season and playoffs ===
			Regular season					Playoffs
Season	Team	League	GP	G	A	Pts	PIM	GP	G	A	Pts	PIM
1962–63	Shawinigan Cataractes	QPJHL	—	—	—	—	—	6	1	4	5	14
1963–64	Shawinigan Cataractes	QPJHL	—	—	—	—	—	—	—	—	—	—
1963–64	Trois-Rivieres Reds	QPJHL	36	36	50	86	43	11	8	18	26	6
1964–65	Trois-Rivieres Reds	QPAHL	40	39	50	89	—	—	—	—	—	—
1965–66	Charlotte Checkers	EHL	69	33	30	63	67	9	3	4	7	23
1966–67	Charlotte Checkers	EHL	72	41	37	78	33	8	5	8	13	17
1967–68	Toronto Maple Leafs	NHL	4	0	0	0	0	—	—	—	—	—
1967–68	Tulsa Oilers	CHL	61	31	34	65	35	11	6	6	12	14
1968–69	Tulsa Oilers	CHL	42	19	23	42	22	7	4	1	5	0
1969–70	Phoenix Roadrunners	WHL	72	32	36	68	35	—	—	—	—	—
1970–71	Phoenix Roadrunners	WHL	67	44	49	93	34	5	0	3	3	2
1971–72	Phoenix Roadrunners	WHL	66	33	43	76	61	6	3	3	6	9
1972–73	Phoenix Roadrunners	WHL	72	34	42	76	25	10	8	7	15	7
1973–74	Houston Aeros	WHA	69	24	56	80	39	14	8	9	17	18
1974–75	Houston Aeros	WHA	75	39	47	86	12	11	5	4	9	8
1975–76	Houston Aeros	WHA	70	35	38	73	6	17	2	3	5	2
1976–77	Houston Aeros	WHA	26	2	3	5	8	—	—	—	—	—
1976–77	Phoenix Roadrunners	WHA	16	2	7	9	4	—	—	—	—	—
WHA totals			256	102	151	253	69	42	15	16	31	28
NHL totals			4	0	0	0	0	—	—	—	—	—
