= Larry Lund =

Canadian ice hockey player (born 1940)

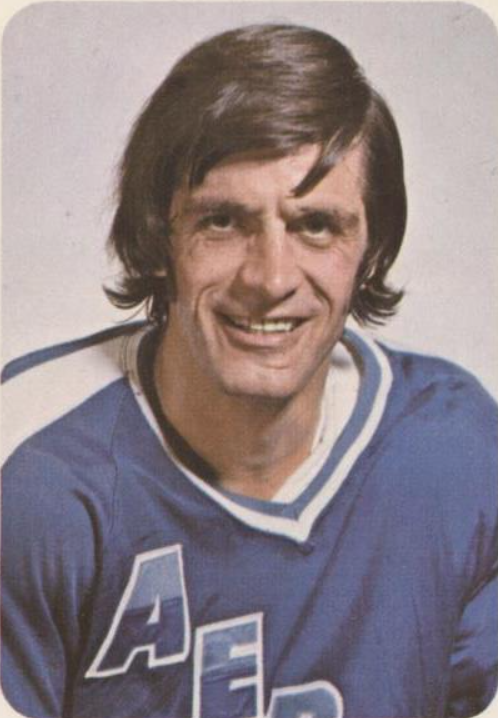
- Lund in 1973
- Born: August 9, 1940 (age 85) Penticton, British Columbia, Canada
- Height: 6 ft 0 in (183 cm)
- Weight: 190 lb (86 kg; 13 st 8 lb)
- Position: Centre
- Shot: Right
- Played for: Muskegon Zephyrs (IHL); San Francisco Seals (WHL); Minneapolis Bruins (CPHL); Seattle Totems (WHL); Quebec Aces (AHL); Phoenix Roadrunners (WHL); Houston Aeros (WHA)
- Playing career: 1960–1978

Larry Lund (born September 9, 1940) is a Canadian retired professional ice hockey player who played in the World Hockey Association (WHA) playing 459 games all with the Houston Aeros.

== Playing career ==
Lund was a veteran minor-leaguer, who was more famous for founding Okanagan Hockey School than as a hockey player until the WHA came into existence in 1972. The upstart league presented opportunities not only for high-profile National Hockey League (NHL) stars but minor league players outside North America as well. Signing with the Houston franchise, Lund has said that he went from earning $22,000 in the minors to $150,000 in the WHA.

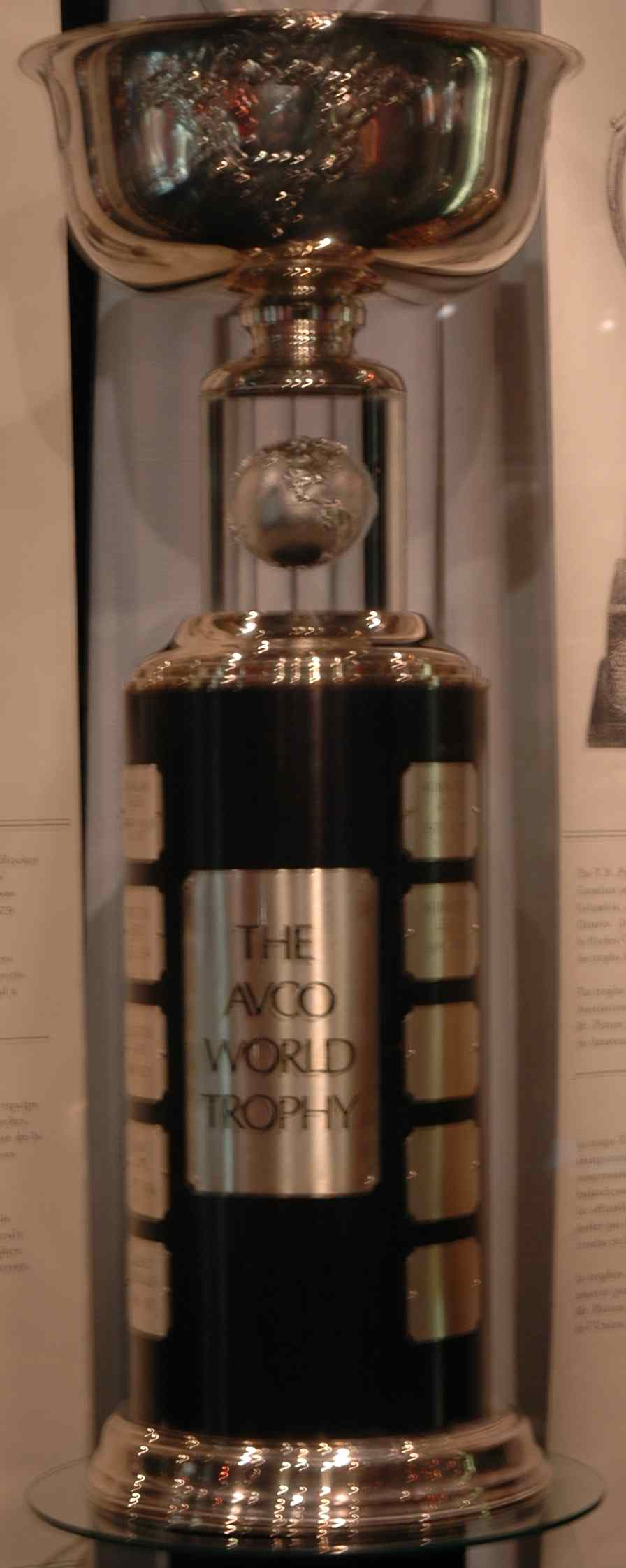
Lund twice won the WHA championship.

While never playing in the NHL, Lund had a significant career in the WHA as he won the league championship Avco Cup twice and finished at twelfth all-time in points. Lund's best season was 1974–75 when he led his team in points with 108, ahead of the legendary Gordie Howe, to finish fifth overall in league points, he participated in the annual All-Star game and his team won the league championship. In his WHA career, he had 149 goals, and 277 assists, with 426 points alongside 20 goals, 25 assists, and 45 points in the playoffs.

Lund was the owner of the Barley Mill Brew Pub in Penticton, British Columbia.

== Honours ==
On July 25, 2008, Larry Lund was inducted into the BC Hockey Hall Of Fame.

In 2012, he was inducted into the World Hockey Association Hall of Fame.

== Career statistics ==
=== Regular season and playoffs ===
			Regular season					Playoffs
Season	Team	League	GP	G	A	Pts	PIM	GP	G	A	Pts	PIM
1959–60	Edmonton Oil Kings	CAHL	—	—	—	—	—	—	—	—	—	—
1960–61	Edmonton Oil Kings	CAHL	—	—	—	—	—	—	—	—	—	—
1961–62	Muskegon Zephyrs	IHL	64	29	26	55	92	9	2	3	5	6
1962–63	Muskegon Zephyrs	IHL	70	13	38	51	69	6	3	2	5	12
1963–64	San Francisco Seals	WHL	67	2	11	13	19	11	1	0	1	4
1964–65	Minneapolis Bruins	CPHL	37	30	17	47	26	—	—	—	—	—
1964–65	San Francisco Seals	WHL	37	8	12	20	28	—	—	—	—	—
1965–66	Seattle Totems	WHL	69	24	31	55	56	—	—	—	—	—
1966–67	Seattle Totems	WHL	72	34	38	72	74	10	5	6	11	4
1967–68	Seattle Totems	WHL	68	16	37	53	96	9	2	5	7	15
1968–69	Quebec Aces	AHL	9	1	2	3	2	—	—	—	—	—
1968–69	Seattle Totems	WHL	58	7	14	21	49	4	0	1	1	4
1969–70	Phoenix Roadrunners	WHL	68	33	40	73	54	—	—	—	—	—
1970–71	Phoenix Roadrunners	WHL	69	29	63	92	147	10	8	6	14	16
1971–72	Phoenix Roadrunners	WHL	66	30	66	96	149	6	3	3	6	4
1972–73	Houston Aeros	WHA	77	21	45	66	120	10	3	7	10	24
1973–74	Houston Aeros	WHA	75	33	53	86	109	14	9	14	23	56
1974–75	Houston Aeros	WHA	78	33	75	108	68	13	5	13	18	13
1975–76	Houston Aeros	WHA	73	24	49	73	50	5	1	1	2	4
1976–77	Houston Aeros	WHA	80	29	38	67	36	11	2	8	10	17
1977–78	Houston Aeros	WHA	76	9	17	26	36	6	0	2	2	2
WHA totals			459	149	277	426	419	59	20	45	65	116
