= Poul Popiel =

Danish-American ice hockey player

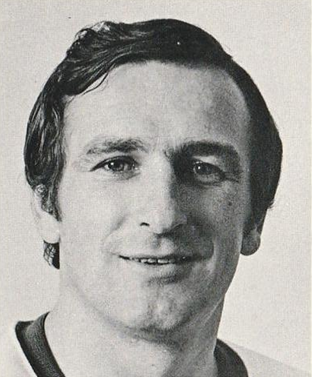
- Popiel in 1975
- Born: February 28, 1943 (age 83) Søllested, Denmark
- Height: 5 ft 10 in (178 cm)
- Weight: 176 lb (80 kg; 12 st 8 lb)
- Position: Defence
- Shot: Left
- Played for: Boston Bruins; Los Angeles Kings; Detroit Red Wings; Vancouver Canucks; Houston Aeros; Innsbrucker EV; Edmonton Oilers
- Playing career: 1962–1980

Poul Peter Popiel (born February 28, 1943) is a Danish-American former professional ice hockey defenceman who played in the National Hockey League (NHL) and World Hockey Association (WHA), and also served as a head coach in the minor leagues. He played all six of his WHA seasons with the Houston Aeros. Following a brief 12 games in the International Hockey League (IHL) with the Muskegon Mohawks, he retired and became the head coach. Popiel and Garry Peters were co-winners of the inaugural Ken McKenzie Trophy as Central Professional Hockey League rookies of the year in 1963-64. His younger brother Jan Popiel is also a former professional hockey player.

Popiel was the first Danish-born player in the National Hockey League. Popiel's family moved to Canada in 1951 when he was a child, and subsequently moved to the United States and he acquired American citizenship before making his NHL debut.

== Awards ==
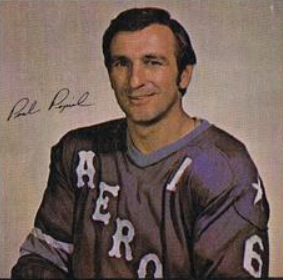
Poul Popiel (pictured in 1974) played in 467 total games for the WHA.

- Ken McKenzie Trophy
- Played in WHA All-Star Game (1974, 1975, 1977)

== Career statistics ==
			Regular season					Playoffs
Season	Team	League	GP	G	A	Pts	PIM	GP	G	A	Pts	PIM
1960–61	St. Catharines Teepees	OHA-Jr.	38	2	9	11	74	3	0	1	1	2
1961–62	St. Catharines Teepees	OHA-Jr.	49	3	16	19	128	6	0	0	0	11
1962–63	St. Catharines Black Hawks	OHA-Jr.	50	11	34	45	131	—	—	—	—	—
1962–63	Buffalo Bisons	AHL	2	0	1	1	2	—	—	—	—	—
1963–64	St. Louis Braves	CPHL	54	9	14	23	78	6	0	1	1	17
1963–64	Buffalo Bisons	AHL	4	0	0	0	4	—	—	—	—	—
1964–65	Buffalo Bisons	AHL	48	7	12	19	76	9	0	1	1	29
1965–66	Hershey Bears	AHL	63	6	26	32	101	3	0	0	0	2
1965–66	Boston Bruins	NHL	3	0	1	1	2	—	—	—	—	—
1966–67	Hershey Bears	AHL	63	5	27	32	134	5	1	0	1	10
1967–68	Springfield Kings	AHL	72	8	27	35	180	4	0	0	0	4
1967–68	Los Angeles Kings	NHL	1	0	0	0	0	3	1	0	1	4
1968–69	Springfield Kings	AHL	13	0	10	10	19	—	—	—	—	—
1968–69	Detroit Red Wings	NHL	62	2	13	15	82	—	—	—	—	—
1969–70	Cleveland Barons	AHL	22	3	15	18	14	—	—	—	—	—
1969–70	Detroit Red Wings	NHL	32	0	4	4	31	1	0	0	0	0
1970–71	Vancouver Canucks	NHL	78	10	22	32	61	—	—	—	—	—
1971–72	Rochester Americans	AHL	12	7	4	11	10	—	—	—	—	—
1971–72	Vancouver Canucks	NHL	38	1	1	2	36	—	—	—	—	—
1972–73	Houston Aeros	WHA	73	16	48	64	158	10	2	9	11	23
1973–74	Houston Aeros	WHA	78	7	41	48	126	14	1	14	15	22
1974–75	Houston Aeros	WHA	78	11	53	64	123	13	1	10	11	34
1975–76	Houston Aeros	WHA	78	10	36	46	71	17	3	5	8	16
1976–77	Houston Aeros	WHA	80	12	56	68	87	11	0	7	7	10
1977–78	Houston Aeros	WHA	80	6	31	37	53	6	0	2	2	13
1978–79	Innsbrucker EV	AUT	34	6	28	34	99	—	—	—	—	—
1979–80	Edmonton Oilers	NHL	10	0	0	0	0	—	—	—	—	—
1979–80	Houston Apollos	CHL	57	2	27	29	28	6	0	1	1	10
1981–82	Muskegon Mohawks	IHL	12	0	4	4	10	—	—	—	—	—
AHL totals			299	36	122	158	540	21	1	1	2	45
NHL totals			224	13	41	54	212	4	1	0	1	4
WHA totals			467	62	265	327	618	71	7	47	54	118

=== Coaching statistics ===
Season	Team	League	GP	W	L	W%
1981–82	Muskegon Mohawks	IHL	55	24	30	0.445
