= Toronto Toros =

Defunct World Hockey Association franchise

- City: Toronto, Ontario
- League: World Hockey Association
- Operated: 1973–1976
- Home arena: Maple Leaf Gardens & Varsity Arena
- Colors: Red, blue, white
- Media: CKGN-TV; CFRB

Franchise history
- 1972–1973: Ottawa Nationals
- 1973 playoffs: Ontario Nationals
- 1973–1976: Toronto Toros
- 1976–1979: Birmingham Bulls

The Toronto Toros were an ice hockey team based in Toronto that played in the World Hockey Association from 1973 to 1976.

== History ==
The franchise was awarded to Doug Michel in 1971 for $25,000 to play in the WHA's inaugural 1972–73 season. Harold Ballard, owner of Maple Leaf Gardens and the Toronto Maple Leafs, offered to rent the arena to the team if it was located in Toronto, but Michel found the rent excessive. He then tried to base the team in Hamilton, but the city did not have an appropriate venue. Michel settled on Ottawa and the team became the Ottawa Nationals. Nick Trbovich became majority owner in May 1972.

The team was a flop at the box office, averaging about 3,000 fans a game, and in March 1973 — just before the end of the season — the City of Ottawa demanded payment of $100,000 to guarantee the club dates at the Ottawa Civic Centre. The team decided to leave Ottawa and played their home playoff games at Maple Leaf Gardens, attracting crowds of 5,000 and 4,000 in two games before being eliminated by the New England Whalers. During this playoff series, the team was referred to as the "Ontario Nationals". At the end of the season, the team moved to Toronto permanently, and was sold to John F. Bassett, son of media mogul and former Leafs part-owner John W. H. Bassett. Future Leafs owner Steve Stavro was a minority shareholder. They were renamed the Toronto Toros in June 1973.

Initially, Bassett wanted to move the team into a renovated CNE Coliseum, while Bill Ballard — Harold's son, who was running the Gardens while his father served a prison sentence — wanted the team at the Gardens and opposed the plan to upgrade the Coliseum. The Toros ended up at Varsity Arena for the 1973–74 season. Bassett signed forwards Pat Hickey and Wayne Dillon to aid the offensive attack. He also made a strong attempt to sign Leaf centre Darryl Sittler, and thought he had an agreement for a five-year $1 million contract, but Sittler re-signed with the Leafs. The Toros played to a 41–33–4 record in the regular season, bolstered by goaltenders Gilles Gratton and Les Binkley and a strong defensive corps backstopped by ex-Maple Leaf star Carl Brewer. The Toros also fared well in the playoffs, making it to the Eastern Conference final, only to lose to the Chicago Cougars.

The Toros moved to Maple Leaf Gardens for the 1974–75 season, however, by this time Harold Ballard had regained control of the Gardens. Ballard was a virulent opponent of the WHA; he never forgave the upstart league for nearly decimating the Leafs' roster in the early 1970s, and Ballard had a few years earlier been involved with a power struggle with Bassett's father for control of the Maple Leafs, one that Ballard ultimately won. Ballard deliberately made the Toros' lease terms at the Gardens as onerous as possible with the Toros' lease with Maple Leaf Gardens Ltd. calling for them to pay $15,000 per game. However, much to Bassett's outrage, the arena was dim for the first game. It was then that Ballard demanded $3,500 for use of the lights. Ballard also denied the Toros access to the Leafs' locker room, forcing them to build their own at a cost of $55,000. He also removed the cushions from the home bench for Toros' games (he told an arena worker, "Let 'em buy their own cushions!"). It was obvious that Ballard was angered at the WHA being literally in his backyard, and took his frustration on the renegade league out on the Toros.

Despite the financial difficulties, the Toros managed to strengthen themselves in the off-season. They signed two ex-Leafs: former NHL superstar Frank Mahovlich and the hero from the 1972 Summit Series, Paul Henderson, as well as Czech star Vaclav Nedomansky, who defected to Toronto. Tom Simpson became the first professional hockey player in Toronto to have a 50-goal season, scoring 52 goals (a number he would never come close to matching again). The Toros finished the year with the league's fifth-best record at 43–33–2, but were knocked out of the playoffs in the first round by the San Diego Mariners. The Toros were now averaging 10,000 fans per home game. Notably, the Toros staged an event during the intermission of a Toros game where stunt rider Evel Knievel took four shots (worth $5,000 each) against a Toro goaltender (originally meant to be Gilles Gratton but instead it was done by Les Binkley); Knievel went 2-for-4.

In part due to the expenses associated with playing in the Gardens, the Toros bottomed out in the 1975–76 season. They finished with a horrible 24–52–5 record—the worst in the league—under their head coach Bobby Baun, despite Nedomansky's 56 goals and the signing of 18-year-old Mark Napier, who scored 93 points in his rookie year. The Toros still averaged over 8,000 fans per game, which was a 20 percent drop from the previous year.

In the middle of the 1976 WHA playoffs, team president John F. Bassett announced that the team would relocate, stating that they had lost an average of nearly $1.5 million a year, compacted with having just 3,600 season ticket holders for a venue in the Gardens that housed over 16,000 and charged $15,000 rent per game. A ticket drive aimed at getting 7,500 tickets sold less than half the target, which was likely hindered by the looming expansion franchise in baseball for the city. Bassett that the five sites in mind were Ottawa, St. Paul, Birmingham, Miami, and Milwaukee. Bassett moved the club to Birmingham, Alabama, where they were renamed the Birmingham Bulls for the 1976–77 season. The last active Toros player in the NHL was Mark Napier, who last played in the NHL in the 1988–89 NHL season and retired in 1993 in Italy. As well, Toros draft pick Kent Nilsson played his last NHL game in 1995 and retired in Europe in 1998, but never played for Toronto in the WHA.

== Season-by-season record ==
Note: GP = Games played, W = Wins, L = Losses, T = Ties, Pts = Points, GF = Goals for, GA = Goals against, PIM = Penalties in minutes

Season	GP	W	L	T	Pts	GF	GA	PIM	Finish	Playoffs
1973–74	78	41	33	4	86	304	272	871	2nd, Eastern	Won Quarterfinals (Crusaders); Lost Semifinals (Cougars)
1974–75	78	43	33	2	88	349	304	883	2nd, Canadian	Lost Quarterfinals (Mariners)
1975–76	81	24	52	5	53	335	398	1099	4th, Canadian	Did not qualify
Totals	237	108	118	11	227	988	974	2853

== Hall of famers ==
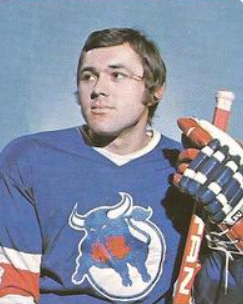
Nedomanský for the Toronto Toros of the WHA in 1975.

- Frank Mahovlich; 1974–1976 (inducted 1981)
- Vaclav Nedomansky; 1974–1976 (inducted 2019)

== See also ==
- List of Toronto Toros players
- List of ice hockey teams in Ontario
