= List of Calgary Cowboys (WHA) players =

This is a list of players who played at least one game for the Calgary Cowboys (1975–76 to 1976–77) of the World Hockey Association (WHA).

== A ==
John Arbour,

== B ==
Ken Baird, Yvon Bilodeau, Jim Boyd, Gary Bromley,

== C ==
Terry Caffery, Ron Chipperfield, Wayne Connelly,

== D ==
Butch Deadmarsh, Ray Delorenzi, Andre Deschamps, Ken Desjardine, Peter Driscoll,

== E ==
Chris Evans,

== F ==
Mike Ford,

== G ==
Dave Gilmour, Bill Gratton, Bruce Greig, Danny Gruen,

== H ==
Derek Haas, Hugh Harris, Harry Howell, Steve Hull, Ed Humphreys, Paul Hurley,

== I ==
Larry Israelson,

== J ==
Rick Jodzio, Ric Jordan,

== K ==
Murray Keogan, Veli-Pekka Ketola, Gavin Kirk, Dave Kryskow,

== L ==
Francois Lacombe, Danny Lawson, Bob Leiter, Richard Lemieux, Doug Lindskog, Jacques Locas, Bernie Lukowich,

== M ==
Jim Mayer, Jim McCrimmon, Don McLeod, Vic Mercredi, Joe Micheletti, Warren Miller, John Miszuk, Wayne Morrin, George Morrison,

== O ==
Wally Olds,

== P ==
George Pesut, Lynn Powis,

== R ==
Bill Reed, Duane Rupp,

== S ==
Rick Sentes, Tom Serviss, Claude St. Sauveur,

== T ==
Don Tannahill, Paul Terbenche,

== W ==
Brian Walsh, Rob Walton, Ron Ward, Pat Westrum, Wayne Wood,
