= 1975–76 Calgary Cowboys season =

World Hockey Association team season

1975–76 Calgary Cowboys
- Division: 3rd Canadian
- 1975–76 record: 41–35–4
- Home record: 25–13–2
- Road record: 16–22–2
- Goals for: 307
- Goals against: 282

Team information
- Coach: Joe Crozier
- Captain: Danny Lawson
- Alternate captains: Ron Chipperfield; Butch Deadmarsh; Paul Terbenche
- Arena: Stampede Corral

Team leaders
- Goals: Danny Lawson (44)
- Assists: Danny Lawson (52)
- Points: Danny Lawson (96)
- Penalty minutes: Butch Deadmarsh (196)
- Wins: Don McLeod (30)
- Goals against average: Wayne Wood (3.07)

The 1975–76 Calgary Cowboys season was the fourth season of the World Hockey Association (WHA) franchise and first in Calgary, Alberta. The Vancouver Blazers relocated to Calgary prior to the season. The Cowboys qualified for the playoffs, losing in the second round to the Winnipeg Jets.

== Regular season ==
In their first season, the Cowboys were not expected to ice a strong team, having inherited a franchise that finished in a last place tie with the Oilers the previous year. Calgary finished 41–35–4 however, as a 44-goal season by Danny Lawson and 42 goals from Ron Chipperfield helped the Cowboys finish a surprising third in the Canadian division.

=== Final standings ===
Canadian Division	GP	W	L	T	Pts	GF	GA	PIM
Winnipeg Jets	81	52	27	2	106	345	254	940
Quebec Nordiques	81	50	27	4	104	371	316	1654
Calgary Cowboys	80	41	35	4	86	307	282	1064
Edmonton Oilers	81	27	49	5	59	268	345	991
Toronto Toros	81	24	52	5	53	335	398	1099
Denver Spurs / Ottawa Civics+	41	14	26	1	29	134	172	536

+team started season in Western Division when playing in Denver; transferred by league to Canadian Division shortly after moving to Ottawa.

== Schedule and results ==
1975–76 regular season
October

Game	Result	Date	Score	Opponent	Record
1	L	October 12, 1975	0–2	Minnesota Fighting Saints (1975–76)	0–1–0
2	W	October 14, 1975	5–3	Indianapolis Racers (1975–76)	1–1–0
3	L	October 17, 1975	2–6	Cincinnati Stingers (1975–76)	1–2–0
4	L	October 22, 1975	1–2	Denver Spurs/Ottawa Civics (1975–76)	1–3–0
5	L	October 24, 1975	3–4	Phoenix Roadrunners (1975–76)	1–4–0
6	L	October 26, 1975	1–3	@ New England Whalers (1975–76)	1–5–0
7	W	October 29, 1975	3–1	@ Cleveland Crusaders (1975–76)	2–5–0
8	W	October 30, 1975	7–5	@ Indianapolis Racers (1975–76)	3–5–0

November

Game	Result	Date	Score	Opponent	Record
9	L	November 1, 1975	2–3	@ Cincinnati Stingers (1975–76)	3–6–0
10	W	November 2, 1975	4–3 OT	New England Whalers (1975–76)	4–6–0
11	T	November 4, 1975	4–4	San Diego Mariners (1975–76)	4–6–1
12	W	November 5, 1975	4–2	Quebec Nordiques (1975–76)	5–6–1
13	W	November 7, 1975	5–2	Cleveland Crusaders (1975–76)	6–6–1
14	W	November 11, 1975	6–3	Edmonton Oilers (1975–76)	7–6–1
15	L	November 13, 1975	2–4	Winnipeg Jets (1975–76)	7–7–1
16	W	November 16, 1975	5–3	Houston Aeros (1975–76)	8–7–1
17	L	November 18, 1975	2–6	San Diego Mariners (1975–76)	8–8–1
18	W	November 21, 1975	6–2	@ Denver Spurs/Ottawa Civics (1975–76)	9–8–1
19	W	November 22, 1975	6–4	@ Minnesota Fighting Saints (1975–76)	10–8–1
20	W	November 27, 1975	5–1	@ Phoenix Roadrunners (1975–76)	11–8–1
21	W	November 29, 1975	5–4 OT	@ San Diego Mariners (1975–76)	12–8–1
22	L	November 30, 1975	2–4	@ Edmonton Oilers (1975–76)	12–9–1

December

Game	Result	Date	Score	Opponent	Record
23	L	December 3, 1975	3–4	Toronto Toros (1975–76)	12–10–1
24	W	December 5, 1975	8–3	Edmonton Oilers (1975–76)	13–10–1
25	W	December 7, 1975	5–4	@ Edmonton Oilers (1975–76)	14–10–1
26	W	December 9, 1975	4–1	Quebec Nordiques (1975–76)	15–10–1
27	L	December 11, 1975	2–3	Edmonton Oilers (1975–76)	15–11–1
28	L	December 12, 1975	2–4	@ Winnipeg Jets (1975–76)	15–12–1
29	T	December 14, 1975	3–3	@ Toronto Toros (1975–76)	15–12–2
30	L	December 16, 1975	3–7	@ Quebec Nordiques (1975–76)	15–13–2
31	W	December 19, 1975	5–3	@ Toronto Toros (1975–76)	16–13–2
32	L	December 20, 1975	7–8	@ Quebec Nordiques (1975–76)	16–14–2
33	W	December 23, 1975	10–1	Toronto Toros (1975–76)	17–14–2
34	W	December 26, 1975	5–4	@ Winnipeg Jets (1975–76)	18–14–2
35	W	December 28, 1975	6–4	Winnipeg Jets (1975–76)	19–14–2

January

Game	Result	Date	Score	Opponent	Record
36	W	January 1, 1976	5–1	Edmonton Oilers (1975–76)	20–14–2
37	W	January 2, 1976	3–1	@ Edmonton Oilers (1975–76)	21–14–2
38	L	January 3, 1976	3–6	Winnipeg Jets (1975–76)	21–15–2
39	W	January 6, 1976	5–0	Winnipeg Jets (1975–76)	22–15–2
40	W	January 7, 1976	3–1	Indianapolis Racers (1975–76)	23–15–2
41	L	January 15, 1976	3–5	@ Quebec Nordiques (1975–76)	23–16–2
42	W	January 17, 1976	4–2	Houston Aeros (1975–76)	24–16–2
43	W	January 20, 1976	10–3	@ Edmonton Oilers (1975–76)	25–16–2
44	L	January 21, 1976	1–4	@ Winnipeg Jets (1975–76)	25–17–2
45	L	January 23, 1976	0–2	@ Houston Aeros (1975–76)	25–18–2
46	L	January 25, 1976	3–5	@ Houston Aeros (1975–76)	25–19–2
47	L	January 28, 1976	0–5	@ Phoenix Roadrunners (1975–76)	25–20–2
48	L	January 29, 1976	0–1	@ San Diego Mariners (1975–76)	25–21–2

February

Game	Result	Date	Score	Opponent	Record
49	W	February 3, 1976	3–2	Cincinnati Stingers (1975–76)	26–21–2
50	L	February 5, 1976	4–6	New England Whalers (1975–76)	26–22–2
51	T	February 7, 1976	4–4	Quebec Nordiques (1975–76)	26–22–3
52	L	February 8, 1976	4–8	@ Winnipeg Jets (1975–76)	26–23–3
53	W	February 10, 1976	4–3	Toronto Toros (1975–76)	27–23–3
54	W	February 13, 1976	4–3 OT	@ Indianapolis Racers (1975–76)	28–23–3
55	L	February 15, 1976	4–5 OT	@ Cincinnati Stingers (1975–76)	28–24–3
56	L	February 18, 1976	0–4	@ Cleveland Crusaders (1975–76)	28–25–3
57	L	February 20, 1976	3–6	Minnesota Fighting Saints (1975–76)	28–26–3
58	W	February 22, 1976	4–2	Toronto Toros (1975–76)	29–26–3
59	T	February 24, 1976	3–3	@ Edmonton Oilers (1975–76)	29–26–4
60	W	February 25, 1976	5–2	Edmonton Oilers (1975–76)	30–26–4
61	W	February 27, 1976	5–4	Cleveland Crusaders (1975–76)	31–26–4
62	L	February 29, 1976	2–5	Phoenix Roadrunners (1975–76)	31–27–4

March

Game	Result	Date	Score	Opponent	Record
63	W	March 2, 1976	6–3	Edmonton Oilers (1975–76)	32–27–4
64	L	March 3, 1976	4–6	@ Edmonton Oilers (1975–76)	32–28–4
65	W	March 4, 1976	4–1	Quebec Nordiques (1975–76)	33–28–4
66	L	March 6, 1976	2–5	@ Toronto Toros (1975–76)	33–29–4
67	L	March 7, 1976	1–3	@ Winnipeg Jets (1975–76)	33–30–4
68	W	March 9, 1976	7–4	Quebec Nordiques (1975–76)	34–30–4
69	W	March 11, 1976	2–0	Edmonton Oilers (1975–76)	35–30–4
70	W	March 16, 1976	4–3 OT	@ Edmonton Oilers (1975–76)	36–30–4
71	L	March 17, 1976	2–3	@ Winnipeg Jets (1975–76)	36–31–4
72	W	March 20, 1976	8–7	@ Quebec Nordiques (1975–76)	37–31–4
73	L	March 23, 1976	5–6 OT	@ Toronto Toros (1975–76)	37–32–4
74	W	March 24, 1976	7–6	@ New England Whalers (1975–76)	38–32–4
75	L	March 26, 1976	1–4	@ New England Whalers (1975–76)	38–33–4
76	L	March 27, 1976	4–6	@ Quebec Nordiques (1975–76)	38–34–4
77	W	March 28, 1976	5–4	@ Toronto Toros (1975–76)	39–34–4
78	W	March 30, 1976	6–2	Toronto Toros (1975–76)	40–34–4

April

Game	Result	Date	Score	Opponent	Record
79	W	April 2, 1976	4–1	Winnipeg Jets (1975–76)	41–34–4
80	L	April 6, 1976	3–5	Winnipeg Jets (1975–76)	41–35–4

Legend: Win (2 points) Loss (0 points) Tie (1 point)

== Playoffs ==
In the playoffs, the Cowboys met the Quebec Nordiques in the first round. The series is best known for one of hockey's most legendary brawls. The incident began when Calgary's Rick Jodzio cross-checked Quebec's Marc Tardif in the head, causing both teams to leave their benches. The brawl lasted 20 minutes, and ended only when Quebec police gathered at the players benches and escorted the teams back to their dressing rooms. The game resumed following a 20-minute break to allow both teams to cool down, then resumed without eleven players who were ejected from the game. The incident caught the attention of Quebec's Solicitor General Fernand Lalonde, who had the incident investigated as a criminal matter. Jodzio was suspended indefinitely by the league, and later pleaded guilty in a Quebec court to a charge of assault over the incident. Cowboys coach Joe Crozier was suspended for the rest of the series.

Calgary went on to defeat the Nordiques, who had finished 18-points ahead of Calgary in the regular season, but were defeated by the Winnipeg Jets in the second round. The team never really captured the attention of Calgarians, as fewer than 5,000 fans, on average, attended playoff games against the Jets.

1976 Avco Cup playoffs
Quarterfinals vs. Quebec Nordiques – Cowboys win 4–1

Game	Date	Visitor	Score	Home	Series
1	April 10	Calgary Cowboys	3–1	Quebec Nordiques	1–0
2	April 11	Calgary Cowboys	8–4	Quebec Nordiques	2–1
3	April 14	Quebec Nordiques	2–3	Calgary Cowboys	3–1
4	April 16	Quebec Nordiques	4–3	Calgary Cowboys	3–1
5	April 18	Calgary Cowboys	6–4	Quebec Nordiques	4–1

Semifinals vs. Winnipeg Jets – Jets win 4–1

Game	Date	Visitor	Score	Home	Series
1	April 23	Calgary Cowboys	1–6	Winnipeg Jets	0–1
2	April 25	Calgary Cowboys	2–3	Winnipeg Jets	0–2
3	April 28	Winnipeg Jets	6–3	Calgary Cowboys	0–3
4	April 30	Winnipeg Jets	3–7	Calgary Cowboys	1–3
5	May 2	Calgary Cowboys	0–4	Winnipeg Jets	1–4

Legend: Win Loss

== Player statistics ==
Regular season
Scoring

Player	Pos	GP	G	A	Pts	PIM	+/-	PPG	SHG	GWG
Danny Lawson	RW	80	44	52	96	46	13	7	4	5
Ron Chipperfield	C	75	42	41	83	32	13	19	0	5
George Morrison	LW	79	25	32	57	13	5	7	1	0
Butch Deadmarsh	LW	79	26	28	54	196	5	5	2	4
Dick Sentes	LW	72	25	24	49	33	9	7	0	5
Don Tannahill	LW	78	25	24	49	10	6	1	5	5
Bobby Leiter	C	51	17	17	34	8	6	6	0	0
Peter Driscoll	LW	75	16	18	34	127	12	2	0	6
Larry Israelson	LW	57	10	22	32	26	10	1	0	1
Francois Lacombe	D	71	3	28	31	62	11	1	0	0
Steve Hull	RW	58	11	15	26	6	-2	0	0	0
Chris Evans	D	75	3	20	23	50	12	1	0	0
John Miszuk	D	69	2	21	23	66	31	0	0	0
Ray Delorenzi	RW	39	8	12	20	4	7	0	1	0
Murray Keogan	C	38	7	11	18	19	0	0	0	2
Terry Caffery	C	21	5	13	18	4	3	1	0	2
Rick Jodzio	LW	47	10	7	17	137	5	0	0	2
Duane Rupp	D	42	0	16	16	33	-6	0	0	0
Gavin Kirk	C	15	7	8	15	14	8	1	0	1
Derek Haas	C	30	5	9	14	6	5	0	0	0
Hugh Harris	C	30	5	9	14	19	-7	0	0	2
Lynn Powis	C	21	4	10	14	2	2	0	1	0
Don McLeod	G	63	0	13	13	4	0	0	0	0
Bernie Lukowich	RW	15	5	2	7	18	-5	0	0	1
Paul Terbenche	D	58	2	4	6	22	-3	0	1	0
Wally Olds	D	28	0	5	5	6	4	0	0	0
Bill Reed	D	29	0	5	5	14	3	0	0	0
Harry Howell	D	31	0	3	3	6	4	0	0	0
Pat Westrum	D	9	0	2	2	23	2	0	0	0
Bill Gratton	LW	6	0	1	1	2	-2	0	0	0
Yvon Bilodeau	D	4	0	0	0	2	-4	0	0	0
Ken Desjardine	D	1	0	0	0	0	0	0	0	0
Dave Gilmour	LW	1	0	0	0	0	-2	0	0	0
Ed Humphreys	G	8	0	0	0	0	0	0	0	0
Jim McCrimmon	D	5	0	0	0	2	1	0	0	0
Vic Mercredi	C	3	0	0	0	29	0	0	0	0
Warren Miller	RW	3	0	0	0	0	0	0	0	0
Rob Walton	C	2	0	0	0	0	0	0	0	0
Wayne Wood	G	19	0	0	0	4	0	0	0	0

Goaltending

Player	MIN	GP	W	L	T	GA	GAA	SO
Don McLeod	3534	63	30	27	3	206	3.50	1
Wayne Wood	880	19	9	3	1	45	3.07	1
Ed Humphreys	441	8	2	5	0	27	3.67	0
Team:	4855	80	41	35	4	278	3.44	2

Playoffs
Scoring

Player	Pos	GP	G	A	Pts	PIM	PPG	SHG	GWG
Chris Evans	D	10	5	5	10	4	0	0	0
Gavin Kirk	C	10	4	6	10	19	0	0	0
Ron Chipperfield	C	10	5	4	9	6	0	0	0
Lynn Powis	C	10	5	4	9	2	0	0	0
Danny Lawson	RW	9	4	4	8	19	0	0	0
Bernie Lukowich	RW	10	3	4	7	8	0	0	0
Peter Driscoll	LW	10	2	5	7	41	0	0	0
Don Tannahill	LW	10	2	5	7	8	0	0	0
Paul Terbenche	D	10	0	6	6	6	0	0	0
George Morrison	LW	10	3	2	5	0	0	0	0
Bobby Leiter	C	3	2	0	2	0	0	0	0
Wally Olds	D	9	0	2	2	4	0	0	0
Duane Rupp	D	7	0	2	2	0	0	0	0
Warren Miller	RW	10	1	0	1	28	0	0	0
Butch Deadmarsh	LW	8	0	1	1	14	0	0	0
Don McLeod	G	10	0	1	1	4	0	0	0
John Miszuk	D	10	0	1	1	10	0	0	0
Dick Sentes	LW	8	0	1	1	8	0	0	0
Pat Westrum	D	6	0	1	1	19	0	0	0
Derek Haas	C	1	0	0	0	0	0	0	0
Harry Howell	D	2	0	0	0	2	0	0	0
Ed Humphreys	G	1	0	0	0	0	0	0	0
Larry Israelson	LW	3	0	0	0	0	0	0	0
Rick Jodzio	LW	2	0	0	0	14	0	0	0
Francois Lacombe	D	8	0	0	0	2	0	0	0

Goaltending

Player	MIN	GP	W	L	GA	GAA	SO
Don McLeod	579	10	5	5	37	3.83	0
Ed Humphreys	20	1	0	0	0	0.00	0
Team:	599	10	5	5	37	3.71	0

Note: Pos = Position; GP = Games played; G = Goals; A = Assists; Pts = Points; +/- = plus/minus; PIM = Penalty minutes; PPG = Power-play goals; SHG = Short-handed goals; GWG = Game-winning goals
MIN = Minutes played; W = Wins; L = Losses; T = Ties; GA = Goals-against; GAA = Goals-against average; SO = Shutouts;

== Draft picks ==
Calgary's draft picks at the 1975 WHA Amateur Draft.

Round	#	Player	Nationality	College/Junior/Club team (League)
1	7	Denny McLean (LW)	Canada	Calgary Centennials (WCHL)
3	37	Alex Pirus (C)	Canada	University of Notre Dame (WCHA)
4	52	Rick Piche (D)	Canada	Brandon Wheat Kings (WCHL)
5	67	Terry Bucyk (RW)	Canada	Lethbridge Broncos (WCHL)
6	80	Pat Hughes (F)	Canada	University of Michigan (WCHA)
7	94	Greg Smith (D)	Canada	Colorado College (WCHA)
8	106	Doug Lindskog (LW)	Canada	University of Michigan (WCHA)
9	118	Paul Clarke (RW)	Canada	University of Notre Dame (WCHA)
10	131	Randy Koch (F)	United States	University of Vermont (ECAC)
11	144	Dan Tsubouchi (RW)	Canada	St. Louis University (CCHA)
12	155	Bill Anderson (D)	Canada	St. Louis University (CCHA)
13	165	Doug Hanson	Canada	
14	172	Darrell Ferner (C)	Canada	Kamloops Chiefs (WCHL)

== See also ==
- 1975–76 WHA season
