= Tidewater Sharks =

American minor league professional ice hockey team (1975–1977)

- City: Norfolk, Virginia
- League: Southern Hockey League
- Operated: 1975–1977
- Home arena: Norfolk Scope
- Colors: Red, white, cyan
- Owner: Dick Davis
- Affiliates: WHA (1975–77); NHL (1975–76)

Franchise history
- 1975–1977: Tidewater Sharks

The Tidewater Sharks were a minor league professional ice hockey team, based in Norfolk, Virginia, and members of the Southern Hockey League from 1975 to 1977. The Sharks played home games at the Norfolk Scope, and shared the Hampton Roads area with the Hampton Gulls. The ownership group led by Dick Davis, also operated the Tidewater Tides baseball team. The Sharks ceased operations in January on 1977, during the second season of play.

== History ==
In the 1975–76 season, Tidewater was affiliated with the Cleveland Crusaders, and the Buffalo Sabres. John Hanna was named the team's first coach, and the Sharks featured Scotland-born top scorer Bill Steele, but finished in fifth-place finish, and missed the playoffs.

In the 1976–77 season, Tidewater was affiliated with the Calgary Cowboys. Harold Schooley took over the coaching duties, and the team was in second place by early 1977. Due to a roster shortage from call-ups to Calgary. Tidewater recruited junior players to play. On January 7, the Sharks folded after missing payroll, and the players refused to continue.

== Notable players ==
Notable Sharks players that also played in the National Hockey League or World Hockey Association:

- Ron Anderson
- Yves Archambault
- Ron Ashton
- Butch Barber
- Michel Boudreau
- Randy Burchell
- Andre Deschamps
- Dave Given
- Bruce Greig
- Derek Haas
- Derek Harker
- Steve Hull
- Larry Israelson
- Mike Jakubo
- Rick Jodzio
- Ric Jordan
- Joe Junkin
- Dave Kryskow
- Rick Lalonde
- Camille LaPierre
- Doug Lindskog
- Bernie Lukowich
- Jim Mayer
- Peter McNamee
- Eddie Mio
- George Pesut
- Tom Serviss
- Claude St. Sauveur
- Bill Steele
- Jean Tetreault
- Jim Watt

== Results ==
Season-by-season results:

Season	GP	W	L	T	Pts	Pct	GF	GA	PIM	Standing	Playoffs
1975–76	72	24	34	14	62	0.431	230	260	842	5th, SHL	Out of playoffs
1976–77	41	26	13	2	54	0.659	158	131	580	2nd, SHL	Folded
TOTALS	113	50	47	16	116	0.513	388	391	1422		
