= Westrum =

Westrum is a surname. Notable people with the surname include:

- Erik Westrum (born 1979), American ice hockey player
- Pat Westrum (born 1948), American ice hockey player
- Ron Westrum (born 1945), American sociologist
- Wes Westrum (1922–2002), American baseball player, coach, manager, and scout
