= Lukowich =

Lukowich is a surname. Notable people with the surname include:

- Bernie Lukowich (born 1952), Canadian retired hockey player, father of Brad Lukowich
- Brad Lukowich (born 1976), Canadian hockey player
- Ed Lukowich, Canadian champion curler
- Morris Lukowich (born 1956), Canadian retired hockey player, brother of Ed and cousin of Brad
