= Bruce Greig =

Canadian ice hockey player (1953–2008)

- Born: May 9, 1953 High River, Alberta, Canada
- Died: May 24, 2008 (aged 55) Nanton, Alberta, Canada
- Height: 6 ft 2 in (188 cm)
- Weight: 220 lb (100 kg; 15 st 10 lb)
- Position: Left wing
- Shot: Left
- Played for: California Golden Seals; Calgary Cowboys; Cincinnati Stingers; Indianapolis Racers
- NHL draft: 114th overall, 1973; California Golden Seals
- WHA draft: 111th overall, 1973; Cleveland Crusaders
- Playing career: 1973–1984

Bruce Greig (May 9, 1953 – May 24, 2008) was a Canadian professional ice hockey winger who played nine games for the California Golden Seals of the National Hockey League and 60 games for the Calgary Cowboys, Cincinnati Stingers and Indianapolis Racers of the World Hockey Association.

== Playing career ==
Greig played 41 total games in major junior hockey with the Medicine Hat Tigers and the Vancouver Nats in the WCHL in the 1971–72 and 1972–73 seasons, respectively. Although he was a fairly skilled player, he was relegated to the role of an enforcer, primarily due to his weight and size, something which was coveted by professional teams during this era of the "Big Bad Bruins" and the "Broad Street Bullies". However, there were many young enforcers coming up through the junior ranks during this period, and as a result Greig was selected 114th overall (8th round) of the 1973 NHL Amateur Draft by the California Golden Seals, and 111th overall in round #9 in the 1973 WHA Amateur Draft by the upstart Cleveland Crusaders, both, not overly high draft placings.

After being cut from the Seals 1973 training camp, Greig chose to quit hockey and focus on other pursuits. However, he was called by the Seals organization during the mid 1973–74 season, and surprisingly was asked if he would report back to the Seals for a roster position for the remainder of the year. At the time, the Seals did not have a dedicated "enforcer", with the exception of skilled younger players such as Seals' rookie defenseman George Pesut who would occasionally step up and fill the role and protect teammates when necessary. However, for the skilled players, it was not deemed to be their role, and injuries were imminent. Consequently, the Seals were in need of a player with Greig's credentials and size. Greig accepted the Seals' offer and contract and joined the team in his new role. However, due to his lack of game shape at the time, he only played one game in the NHL for California in the '73-'74 season. On a conditioning stint, Greig then spent the remainder of the season (13 games) with the Seals' minor league team, the Salt Lake Golden Eagles. The following season in 1974-'75, Greig played a total of 8 games for the Seals, accumulating 1 point, and 42 minutes in penalties, before being benched and sitting out the remainder of the season. The following year seemed to signal his decline in pro hockey, as he managed 10 games with the lowly Flint Generals in the International Hockey League and 1 game with the Seals main farm team, the Salt Lake Golden Eagles in the '75-'76 season. He recorded 5 assists and 88 minutes in penalties while playing in the minors. However, in the '76-'77 season, interest was rekindled in the form of the World Hockey Association's Calgary Cowboys, who signed Greig for his fighting prowess. He played in 7 games for the Cowboys, and split the season playing for their minor league affiliate the Greensboro Generals. Following two seasons saw Greig traded to the Cincinnati Stingers and Indianapolis Racers which had the likes of eventual superstar Wayne Gretzky and high scoring Blaine Stoughton on the roster. Greig played in another 53 games in the WHA, and in the years to follow, Greig played in numerous leagues and for a variety of semi-pro teams before deciding in 1985 that his hockey career had come to an end.

After retiring from hockey Greig turned his exploits to powerlifting. He holds several Canadian powerlifting records, and eventually became president of the Canadian Powerlifting Council. He owned and operated a gym in Okotoks, Alberta with his wife, Wendy. He was the brother of NHL hockey player Mark Greig and the uncle of NHL prospect Ridly Greig.

== Death ==
In 2008, Greig was involved in a single-car collision which claimed his life.

== Career statistics ==
=== Regular season and playoffs ===
			Regular season					Playoffs
Season	Team	League	GP	G	A	Pts	PIM	GP	G	A	Pts	PIM
1971–72	Drumheller Falcons	AJHL	5	0	1	1	6	—	—	—	—	—
1971–72	Medicine Hat Tigers	WCHL	17	3	3	6	11	—	—	—	—	—
1972–73	Vancouver Nats	WCHL	24	3	3	6	79	—	—	—	—	—
1973–74	California Golden Seals	NHL	1	0	0	0	4	—	—	—	—	—
1973–74	Salt Lake Golden Eagles	WHL	13	1	2	3	36	—	—	—	—	—
1974–75	California Golden Seals	NHL	8	0	1	1	42	—	—	—	—	—
1975–76	Salt Lake Golden Eagles	CHL	1	0	0	0	11	—	—	—	—	—
1975–76	Flint Generals	IHL	10	0	5	5	77	—	—	—	—	—
1976–77	Calgary Cowboys	WHA	7	1	1	2	10	—	—	—	—	—
1976–77	Greensboro Generals	SHL	33	10	14	24	68	—	—	—	—	—
1976–77	Tidewater Sharks	SHL	2	0	0	0	2	—	—	—	—	—
1977–78	Cincinnati Stingers	WHA	32	3	1	4	57	—	—	—	—	—
1978–79	Indianapolis Racers	WHA	21	3	7	10	64	—	—	—	—	—
1978–79	San Diego Hawks	PHL	40	15	10	25	168	—	—	—	—	—
1979–80	Dayton Gems	IHL	42	12	17	29	112	—	—	—	—	—
1979–80	Toledo Goaldiggers	IHL	10	2	6	8	2	1	0	0	0	0
1980–81	Salem Raiders	EHL	58	20	32	52	213	6	2	2	4	2
1981–82	Dallas Black Hawks	CHL	9	0	3	3	10	—	—	—	—	—
1981–82	Salem Raiders	ACHL	37	12	20	32	212	11	1	6	7	28
1982–83	Virginia Raiders	ACHL	35	8	16	24	133	—	—	—	—	—
1982–83	Carolina Thunderbirds	ACHL	11	4	5	9	44	—	—	—	—	—
1983–84	Pineridge Bucks	ACHL	37	12	12	24	206	—	—	—	—	—
1983–84	Mohawk Valley Comets	ACHL	—	—	—	—	—	5	0	2	2	49
WHA totals			60	7	9	16	131	—	—	—	—	—
NHL totals			9	0	1	1	46	—	—	—	—	—
