= Frank Spring =

Canadian ice hockey player (born 1949)

- Born: October 19, 1949 (age 76) Rossland, British Columbia, Canada
- Height: 6 ft 3 in (191 cm)
- Weight: 216 lb (98 kg; 15 st 6 lb)
- Position: Right wing
- Shot: Right
- Played for: Boston Bruins; St. Louis Blues; California Golden Seals; Cleveland Barons; Indianapolis Racers
- NHL draft: 4th overall, 1969; Boston Bruins
- Playing career: 1969–1978

Franklin Patrick Spring (born October 19, 1949) is a Canadian former professional ice hockey player who played 61 games in the National Hockey League (NHL) and 13 games in the World Hockey Association (WHA). He was born in Rossland, British Columbia and raised in Cranbrook, British Columbia. He played with the St. Louis Blues, Boston Bruins, California Golden Seals, Cleveland Barons, and Indianapolis Racers.

== Family ==
Spring's father, Frank Spring Sr., owned a car dealership in Cranbrook and served as president of the British Columbia Amateur Hockey Association. Spring's brother, Danny Spring played in the WHA for the Winnipeg Jets and Edmonton Oilers. Spring's son Corey Spring played in the NHL for the Tampa Bay Lightning in the late 1990s.

== Career statistics ==
Career playing statistics:

			Regular season					Playoffs
Season	Team	League	GP	G	A	Pts	PIM	GP	G	A	Pts	PIM
1967–68	Edmonton Oil Kings	WCHL	57	24	27	51	85	13	3	4	7	12
1968–69	Edmonton Oil Kings	WCHL	41	9	16	25	60	17	10	2	12	16
1969–70	Boston Bruins	NHL	1	0	0	0	0	—	—	—	—	—
1969–70	Oklahoma City Blazers	CHL	62	17	22	39	55	—	—	—	—	—
1970–71	Hershey Bears	AHL	43	12	12	24	32	—	—	—	—	—
1971–72	Richmond Robins	AHL	75	12	19	31	61	—	—	—	—	—
1972–73	Richmond Robins	AHL	70	12	19	31	96	4	1	1	2	6
1973–74	Richmond Robins	AHL	18	0	5	5	25	—	—	—	—	—
1973–74	St. Louis Blues	NHL	2	0	0	0	0	—	—	—	—	—
1973–74	Denver Spurs	WHL	47	17	11	28	41	—	—	—	—	—
1974–75	St. Louis Blues	NHL	3	0	0	0	0	—	—	—	—	—
1974–75	Denver Spurs	CHL	31	19	9	28	27	—	—	—	—	—
1974–75	California Golden Seals	NHL	28	3	8	11	6	—	—	—	—	—
1975–76	California Golden Seals	NHL	1	0	2	2	0	—	—	—	—	—
1975–76	Salt Lake Golden Eagles	CHL	75	44	29	73	50	5	0	0	0	8
1976–77	Cleveland Barons	NHL	26	11	10	21	6	—	—	—	—	—
1976–77	Salt Lake Golden Eagles	CHL	19	8	10	18	12	—	—	—	—	—
1977–78	Indianapolis Racers	WHA	13	2	4	6	2	—	—	—	—	—
1977–78	New Haven Nighthawks	AHL	45	14	11	25	35	13	2	4	6	0
NHL totals			61	14	20	34	12	—	—	—	—	—
WHA totals			13	2	4	6	2	—	—	—	—	—
AHL totals			251	50	66	116	249	17	3	5	8	6
CHL totals			187	88	70	158	144	5	0	0	0	8

Preceded by Don Tannahill	Boston Bruins first-round draft pick 1969	Succeeded by Ivan Boldirev
