= Wayne Morrin =

Canadian ice hockey player

- Born: May 13, 1955 (age 70) Dawson Creek, British Columbia, Canada
- Height: 5 ft 10 in (178 cm)
- Weight: 195 lb (88 kg; 13 st 13 lb)
- Position: Defence
- Shot: Right
- Played for: Calgary Cowboys
- NHL draft: Undrafted
- WHA draft: 168th overall, 1975; Toronto Toros
- Playing career: 1975–1979

Wayne Morrin (born May 13, 1955) is a Canadian retired professional ice hockey player who played 13 games in the World Hockey Association with the Calgary Cowboys during the 1976–77 WHA season. He was drafted by the Toronto Toros in the 13th round (168th overall pick) of the 1975 WHA Amateur Draft.

== Career statistics ==
=== Regular season and playoffs ===
			Regular season					Playoffs
Season	Team	League	GP	G	A	Pts	PIM	GP	G	A	Pts	PIM
1972–73	Kamloops Rockets	BCJHL	Statistics Unavailable
1973–74	Calgary-Kamloops	WCHL	66	10	17	27	96	—	—	—	—	—
1974–75	Kamloops Chiefs	WCHL	54	4	18	22	84	6	1	0	1	18
1975–76	Buffalo Norsemen	NAHL	73	1	23	24	172	4	0	1	1	4
1976–77	Calgary Cowboys	WHA	13	2	0	2	25	—	—	—	—	—
1976–77	Charlotte Checkers	SHL	38	2	7	9	89	—	—	—	—	—
1977–78	Drumheller Miners	ASHL	11	2	5	7	41	—	—	—	—	—
1978–79	Calgary Stampeders	WIHL	Statistics Unavailable
WHA totals			13	2	0	2	25	—	—	—	—	—
