= Jim Mayer (ice hockey) =

Canadian ice hockey player

- Born: October 30, 1954 (age 71) Capreol, Ontario, Canada
- Height: 6 ft 0 in (183 cm)
- Weight: 190 lb (86 kg; 13 st 8 lb)
- Position: Right wing
- Shot: Right
- Played for: Calgary Cowboys; New England Whalers; Edmonton Oilers; New York Rangers
- NHL draft: 239th overall, 1974; New York Rangers
- Playing career: 1976–1982

Jim Mayer (born October 30, 1954) is a Canadian former professional ice hockey player who played 74 games in the World Hockey Association and 4 games in the National Hockey League between 1976 and 1980. Mayer was born in Capreol, Ontario, and played with the New England Whalers, Calgary Cowboys, Edmonton Oilers, and the New York Rangers.

== Career ==
Mayer played junior hockey with the Chelmsford Canadiens and won the Northern Ontario Junior Hockey League Rookie of the Year award in the 1971–72 season. He was drafted 239th overall by the Rangers in the 1974 NHL amateur draft. In the 1978–79 CHL season, Mayer scored 33 goals, and 43 assists with the Dallas Black Hawks, and was a second-team all-star in the Central Hockey League.

== Career statistics ==
=== Regular season and playoffs ===
			Regular season					Playoffs
Season	Team	League	GP	G	A	Pts	PIM	GP	G	A	Pts	PIM
1971–72	Chelmsford Canadiens	NOJHL	52	31	42	73	39	6	3	2	5	9
1972–73	Michigan Tech	WCHA	32	6	10	16	10	—	—	—	—	—
1973–74	Michigan Tech	WCHA	30	3	9	12	24	—	—	—	—	—
1974–75	Michigan Tech	WCHA	26	9	7	16	12	—	—	—	—	—
1975–76	Michigan Tech	WCHA	43	29	42	71	58	—	—	—	—	—
1976–77	Calgary Cowboys	WHA	21	2	3	5	0	—	—	—	—	—
1976–77	Tidewater Sharks	SHL	23	11	12	23	8	—	—	—	—	—
1976–77	Erie Blades	NAHL	14	5	4	9	15	—	—	—	—	—
1977–78	New England Whalers	WHA	51	11	9	20	21	—	—	—	—	—
1977–78	Springfield Indians	AHL	19	6	7	13	31	4	0	2	2	6
1978–79	Edmonton Oilers	WHA	2	0	0	0	0	—	—	—	—	—
1978–79	Dallas Black Hawks	CHL	64	33	43	76	78	9	4	6	10	14
1979–80	New York Rangers	NHL	4	0	0	0	0	—	—	—	—	—
1979–80	New Haven Nighthawks	AHL	62	32	35	67	91	10	7	2	9	25
1980–81	Dallas Black Hawks	CHL	13	1	5	6	2	—	—	—	—	—
1980–81	Fort Worth Texans	CHL	50	13	9	22	36	5	0	2	2	2
1980–81	New Haven Nighthawks	AHL	10	1	4	5	6	—	—	—	—	—
1981–82	New Haven Nighthawks	AHL	75	11	23	34	33	4	2	3	5	0
WHA totals			74	13	12	25	21	—	—	—	—	—
NHL totals			4	0	0	0	0	—	—	—	—	—
