= Miami Screaming Eagles =

Former ice hockey team of the World Hockey Association

- City: Miami, Florida
- Owner: Herb Martin

Franchise history
- 1972 (did not play): Miami Screaming Eagles
- 1972–1973: Philadelphia Blazers
- 1973–1975: Vancouver Blazers
- 1975–1977: Calgary Cowboys

The Miami Screaming Eagles were a professional ice hockey team that had intended to play in Miami, Florida, U.S. The Screaming Eagles were charter members of the World Hockey Association, but never played a game in Miami due to the only available arena being unfit for use. The franchise license was purchased and moved, becoming the Philadelphia Blazers for the WHA's inaugural season.

== History ==
The Screaming Eagles franchise was the second attempt at a professional hockey team for the South Florida market, since the folding of the original Tropical Hockey League in 1939. The first came two years prior; Seymour H. Knox III, Northrup R. Knox and Robert O. Swados, the owners of the Buffalo Sabres, were awarded an American Hockey League franchise in 1970. The Knox-Swados consortium intended on placing their AHL team in South Florida; the AHL refused to allow a team to play in a market that distant (the AHL had no teams south of Virginia at the time). The proposed team was instead placed in Cincinnati, Ohio and named the Cincinnati Swords. The name of the team came around in early 1972 as the "Screaming Eagles".

Businessman Herb Martin bought a franchise in the WHA in 1972. The Screaming Eagles made a splash immediately by signing Bernie Parent from the Toronto Maple Leafs—the first National Hockey League star inked by the rebel league—and Boston Bruins standout Derek Sanderson. Martin developed a unique plan to build an arena within the walls of four office buildings to create what he called the Executive Square Arena. This new arena was to have been a showcase for the new league. The WHA had even planned to open their season in Miami on October 6, 1972 by hosting the Winnipeg Jets in the new arena. But the plans started to fall apart when Dade County officials halted construction of the proposed arena. The county faulted Martin for ignoring a zoning ordinance which required at least one parking spot for every four seats in an arena. At a league meeting in Chicago, the WHA rejected Miami's $100,000 performance bond because the Eagles did not have a suitable arena.

With the end of the Executive Square project, the Screaming Eagles had only two options for a temporary home, Miami Beach Convention Center or the then-new Hollywood Sportatorium. But Martin felt neither site was suitable even for temporary use. The Convention Center held only a few thousand for hockey. The Sportatorium had no air conditioning, no permanent seats, and a partially open roof. (Later, when the arena was fully enclosed and expanded, attempts were made to bring in another WHA franchise, but to no avail.)

When Martin was unable to find a solution to the arena problem, WHA president Gary Davidson canceled the franchise on April 28, 1972. In June 1972, Bernard Brown and James Cooper were granted the rights to the Miami Screaming Eagles along with the players (namely Bernie Parent) that were under contract with the team, from Herb Martin. Brown and Cooper then relocated the franchise to Philadelphia (where Parent had previously played for the NHL Flyers, and would again) and renamed the team the Blazers.

Two decades later, South Florida was awarded the National Hockey League's Florida Panthers franchise.

Although they never iced a team, replicas of the projected Screaming Eagles jersey continue to sell along with those of actual WHA teams.

== See also ==
- Philadelphia Blazers
- Vancouver Blazers
- Calgary Cowboys
- List of WHA seasons
