= Claude St. Sauveur =

Canadian ice hockey player

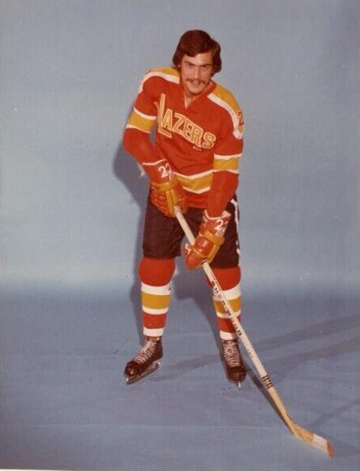
- St. Sauveur in 1973 photo
- Born: January 2, 1952 (age 74) Saint-Hyacinthe, Quebec, Canada
- Height: 6 ft 0 in (183 cm)
- Weight: 181 lb (82 kg; 12 st 13 lb)
- Position: Centre/Left wing
- Shot: Left
- Played for: Sapporo Polaris; Milwaukee Admirals; Cincinnati Stingers; Indianapolis Racers; Edmonton Oilers; Calgary Cowboys; Atlanta Flames; Vancouver Blazers; Philadelphia Blazers
- NHL draft: 54th overall, 1972; California Golden Seals
- Playing career: 1973–1982

Claude St. Sauveur (born January 2, 1952) is a Canadian former professional ice hockey player who played 285 games in the World Hockey Association and 79 games in the National Hockey League between 1972 and 1979.

== Early life ==
St. Sauveur was born in Saint-Hyacinthe, Quebec. As a youth, he played in the 1964 Quebec International Pee-Wee Hockey Tournament with a minor ice hockey team from Saint-Hyacinthe.

== Career ==
During his career, St. Sauveur played for the Roanoke Valley Rebels, Indianapolis Racers, Cincinnati Stingers, Edmonton Oilers, Philadelphia Blazers, Vancouver Blazers, Calgary Cowboys, and Atlanta Flames.

== Career statistics ==
=== Regular season and playoffs ===
			Regular season					Playoffs
Season	Team	League	GP	G	A	Pts	PIM	GP	G	A	Pts	PIM
1969–70	Sherbrooke Castors	QMJHL	26	23	18	41	6	—	—	—	—	—
1970–71	Sherbrooke Castors	QMJHL	62	52	67	119	80	10	11	9	20	10
1971–72	Sherbrooke Castors	QMJHL	60	53	59	112	97	4	1	2	3	4
1972–73	Roanoke Valley Rebels	EHL	62	55	52	107	99	16	11	13	24	0
1972–73	Philadelphia Blazers	WHA	2	1	0	1	0	—	—	—	—	—
1973–74	Vancouver Blazers	WHA	70	38	30	68	55	—	—	—	—	—
1974–75	Vancouver Blazers	WHA	76	24	23	47	32	—	—	—	—	—
1975–76	Atlanta Flames	NHL	79	24	24	48	23	2	0	0	0	0
1976–77	Tidewater Sharks	SHL	6	5	7	12	0	—	—	—	—	—
1976–77	Calgary Cowboys	WHA	17	0	3	3	2	—	—	—	—	—
1976–77	Edmonton Oilers	WHA	15	5	7	12	2	5	1	0	1	0
1977–78	Indianapolis Racers	WHA	72	36	42	78	24	—	—	—	—	—
1978–79	Indianapolis Racers	WHA	17	4	2	6	12	—	—	—	—	—
1978–79	Cincinnati Stingers	WHA	16	4	5	9	4	—	—	—	—	—
1979–80	Milwaukee Admirals	IHL	43	38	57	95	91	1	0	0	0	0
1980–81	Milwaukee Admirals	IHL	54	34	28	62	88	5	2	3	5	6
1981–82	Sapporo Snow Brand	JPN	30	10	28	38	—	—	—	—	—	—
WHA totals			285	112	112	224	131	5	1	0	1	0
NHL totals			79	24	24	48	23	2	0	0	0	0
