= Peter Driscoll =

Canadian ice hockey player (born 1954)

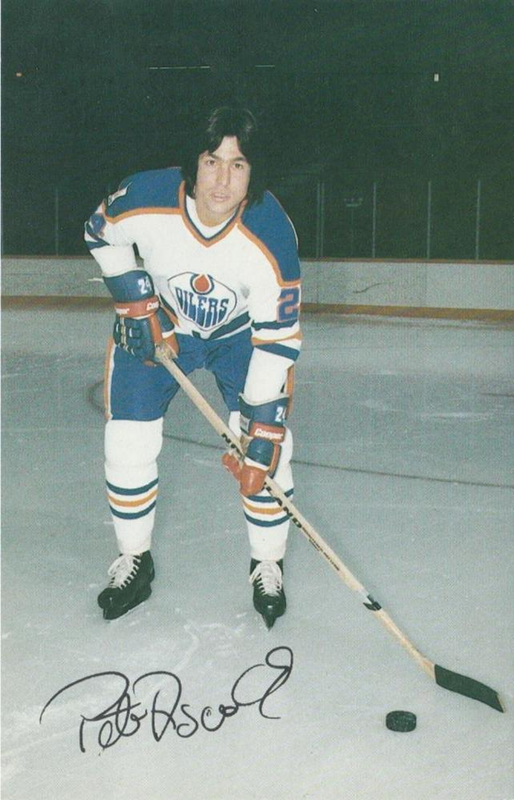
- Born: October 27, 1954 (age 71) Powassan, Ontario, Canada
- Height: 6 ft 0 in (183 cm)
- Weight: 190 lb (86 kg; 13 st 8 lb)
- Position: Left wing
- Shot: Left
- Played for: Vancouver Blazers; Calgary Cowboys; Quebec Nordiques; Indianapolis Racers; Edmonton Oilers
- NHL draft: 67th overall, 1974; Toronto Maple Leafs
- WHA draft: 35th overall, 1974; Vancouver Blazers
- Playing career: 1974–1982

Peter Driscoll (born October 27, 1954) is a Canadian former professional ice hockey left wing who played in the World Hockey Association and National Hockey League between 1974 and 1981. He was born in Powassan, Ontario.

Selected by the Toronto Maple Leafs in the 1974 NHL amateur draft and the Vancouver Blazers in the 1974 WHA Amateur Draft, Driscoll signed with the Blazers, moving to Calgary with them when they relocated.

After the Calgary Cowboys folded, he signed as a free agent with the Quebec Nordiques and was later traded to the Indianapolis Racers. A year later, Driscoll was part of the deal that sent Wayne Gretzky to the Edmonton Oilers on November 2, 1978, with Eddie Mio.

Moving to the NHL with the Oilers, he did not see much action and split time between Edmonton and their CHL affiliates, Houston Apollos and Wichita Wind.

== Career statistics ==
=== Regular season and playoffs ===
			Regular season					Playoffs
Season	Team	League	GP	G	A	Pts	PIM	GP	G	A	Pts	PIM
1972–73	North Bay Trappers	OPJAHL	—	—	—	—	—	—	—	—	—	—
1973–74	Kingston Canadiens	OHA	54	13	21	34	216	—	—	—	—	—
1974–75	Vancouver Blazers	WHA	21	3	2	5	40	—	—	—	—	—
1974–75	Tulsa Oilers	CHL	56	9	10	19	183	—	—	—	—	—
1975–76	Calgary Cowboys	WHA	75	16	18	34	127	10	2	5	7	41
1976–77	Calgary Cowboys	WHA	76	23	29	52	120	—	—	—	—	—
1977–78	Quebec Nordiques	WHA	21	3	7	10	28	—	—	—	—	—
1977–78	Indianapolis Racers	WHA	56	25	21	46	130	—	—	—	—	—
1978–79	Indianapolis Racers	WHA	8	3	1	4	17	—	—	—	—	—
1978–79	Edmonton Oilers	WHA	69	17	23	40	115	13	1	6	7	8
1979–80	Edmonton Oilers	NHL	39	1	5	6	54	3	0	0	0	0
1979–80	Houston Apollos	CHL	8	7	4	11	16	—	—	—	—	—
1980–81	Edmonton Oilers	NHL	21	2	3	5	43	—	—	—	—	—
1980–81	Wichita Wind	CHL	34	11	14	25	75	—	—	—	—	—
1981–82	Wichita Wind	CHL	75	25	29	54	229	—	—	—	—	—
WHA totals			326	90	101	191	577	23	3	11	14	49
NHL totals			60	3	8	11	97	3	0	0	0	0
