= Ed Humphreys =

Canadian ice hockey player

- Born: June 5, 1953 (age 73) Eston, Saskatchewan, Canada
- Height: 6 ft 1 in (185 cm)
- Weight: 170 lb (77 kg; 12 st 2 lb)
- Position: Goalie
- Caught: Left
- Played for: Calgary Cowboys; Quebec Nordiques
- NHL draft: 37th overall, 1973; Montreal Canadiens
- WHA draft: 31st overall, 1973; Vancouver Blazers
- Playing career: 1973–1977

Ed Humphreys (born June 5, 1953) is a Canadian retired professional ice hockey goaltender.

Humphreys was born in Eston, Saskatchewan, Canada. He played 30 games in the World Hockey Association with the Calgary Cowboys and Quebec Nordiques during the 1975–76 and 1976–77 seasons.

== Career statistics ==
=== Regular season and playoffs ===
			Regular season									Playoffs
Season	Team	League	GP	W	L	T	MIN	GA	SO	GAA	SV%	GP	W	L	MIN	GA	SO	GAA	SV%
1970–71	Saskatoon Olympics	SJHL	0	0	0	0	0	0	0	0	0	–	–	–	–	–	–	–	–
1971–72	Saskatoon Blades	WCHL	36	—	—	—	1969	119	0	3.62	.888	3	–	–	–	–	–	–	–
1972–73	Saskatoon Blades	WCHL	57	—	—	—	3313	142	5	2.57	—	–	–	–	–	–	–	–	–
1973–74	Roanoke Valley Rebels	SHL	40	29	9	0	2272	134	1	3.54	.904	5	–	–	–	–	–	–	–
1974–75	Charlotte Checkers	SHL	1	0	0	—	—	—	—	—	—	–	–	–	–	–	–	–	–
1974–75	Tulsa Oilers	CHL	34	10	17	3	1831	113	0	3.70	—	2	–	–	–	–	–	–	–
1975–76	Calgary Cowboys	WHA	8	2	5	0	441	27	0	3.67	.894	1	–	–	20	0	0.00	–	–
1975–76	Springfield Indians	AHL	14	—	—	—	850	47	0	3.32	—	–	–	–	–	–	–	–	–
1975–76	Roanoke Valley Rebels	SHL	20	10	5	4	1132	48	3	2.54	.921	–	–	–	–	–	–	–	–
1976–77	Beauce Jaros	NAHL	16	2	12	2	982	88	0	5.38	.867	–	–	–	–	–	–	–	–
1976–77	Quebec Nordiques	WHA	22	12	8	1	1240	74	1	3.58	.880	–	–	–	–	–	–	–	–
1976–77	Maine Nordiques	NAHL	2	1	0	0	100	1	0	0.60	.971	–	–	–	–	–	–	–	–
WHA totals			30	14	13	1	1681	101	1	3.60	.884	1	—	—	20	0	0.00	—	—
