= Ken Desjardine =

Canadian ice hockey player

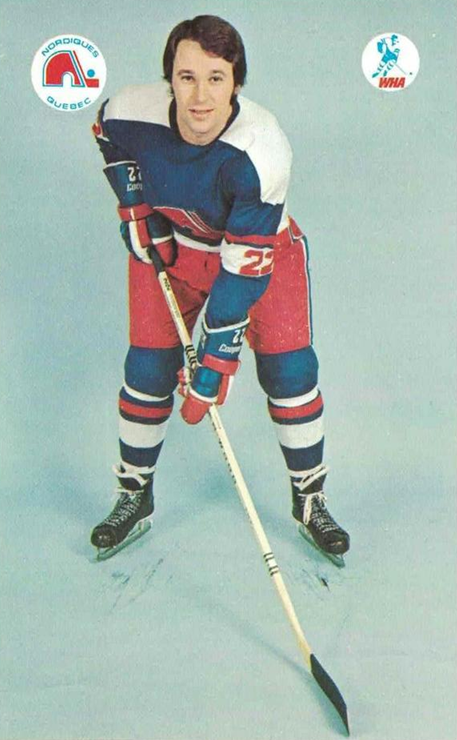
- Desjardine in 1973 photo
- Born: August 23, 1947 (age 78) Toronto, Ontario, Canada
- Height: 6 ft 0 in (183 cm)
- Weight: 180 lb (82 kg; 12 st 12 lb)
- Position: Defenceman
- Shot: Left
- Played for: Indianapolis Racers; Calgary Cowboys; Quebec Nordiques
- Playing career: 1967–1977

Kenneth Frederick Desjardine (born August 23, 1947) is a Canadian retired professional ice hockey defenceman who played 154 games in the World Hockey Association for the Indianapolis Racers, Calgary Cowboys, and Quebec Nordiques.

== Career statistics ==
=== Regular season and playoffs ===
			Regular season					Playoffs
Season	Team	League	GP	G	A	Pts	PIM	GP	G	A	Pts	PIM
1967–68	Michigan Tech	WCHA	32	1	9	10	28	—	—	—	—	—
1968–69	Michigan Tech	WCHA	32	3	12	15	32	—	—	—	—	—
1969–70	Michigan Tech	WCHA	33	3	6	9	28	—	—	—	—	—
1970–71	Tulsa Oilers	CHL	72	3	14	17	108	—	—	—	—	—
1971–72	Tulsa Oilers	CHL	60	2	17	19	100	13	0	3	3	19
1972–73	Quebec Nordiques	WHA	37	2	6	8	36	—	—	—	—	—
1973–74	Quebec Nordiques	WHA	70	2	10	12	44	—	—	—	—	—
1974–75	Indianapolis Racers	WHA	46	0	8	8	68	—	—	—	—	—
1975–76	Calgary Cowboys	WHA	1	0	0	0	0	—	—	—	—	—
1975–76	Whitby Warriors	OHASr	13	0	8	8	11	—	—	—	—	—
1975–76	Salt Lake Golden Eagles	CHL	48	7	18	25	28	5	0	2	2	2
1976–77	Whitby Warriors	OHASr	31	7	29	36	24	—	—	—	—	—
WHA totals			154	4	24	28	148	—	—	—	—	—
