= Paul Terbenche =

Canadian ice hockey player

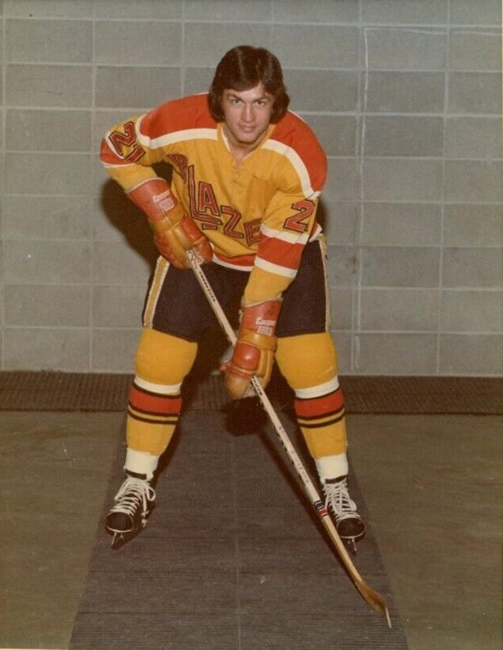
- Born: September 16, 1945 Port Hope, Ontario, Canada
- Died: January 8, 2012 (aged 66) Cobourg, Ontario, Canada
- Height: 5 ft 10 in (178 cm)
- Weight: 170 lb (77 kg; 12 st 2 lb)
- Position: Defence
- Shot: Left
- Played for: Chicago Black Hawks; Buffalo Sabres; Vancouver Blazers; Calgary Cowboys; Birmingham Bulls; Houston Aeros; Winnipeg Jets
- Playing career: 1966–1981

Paul Frederick Terbenche (September 16, 1945 – January 8, 2012) was a Canadian professional ice hockey defenceman. He played in the National Hockey League with the Chicago Black Hawks and Buffalo Sabres from 1967 to 1974, as well as in the World Hockey Association with the Vancouver Blazers, Calgary Cowboys, Birmingham Bulls, Houston Aeros, and Winnipeg Jets from 1974 to 1979. Terbenche won the Avco World Trophy with the Jets in 1979; he arrived on the team after the Jets bought his contract from the defunct Aeros.

During his NHL career, Terbenche appeared in 189 games, scoring five goals and adding twenty-six assists. A free agent in 1974, Terbenche was selected by the Kansas City Scouts in the NHL expansion draft but chose instead to sign with WHA's Vancouver franchise. He played in 277 WHA games, scoring eighteen goals and adding sixty-four assists.

== Career statistics ==
=== Regular season and playoffs ===
			Regular season					Playoffs
Season	Team	League	GP	G	A	Pts	PIM	GP	G	A	Pts	PIM
1963–64	Milton-Ingersoll Aces	OHA-B	—	—	—	—	—	—	—	—	—	—
1964–65	St. Catharines Black Hawks	OHA	56	3	23	26	63	5	0	0	0	4
1965–66	St. Catharines Black Hawks	OHA	48	5	31	36	26	7	1	4	5	2
1965–66	St. Louis Braves	CHL	2	0	0	0	0	5	0	2	2	0
1966–67	St. Louis Braves	CHL	63	4	14	18	39	—	—	—	—	—
1967–68	Chicago Black Hawks	NHL	68	3	7	10	8	6	0	0	0	0
1968–69	Dallas Black Hawks	CHL	26	0	4	4	2	11	0	3	3	2
1969–70	Portland Buckaroos	WHL	66	5	15	20	8	3	0	0	0	0
1970–71	Salt Lake Golden Eagles	WHL	51	4	20	24	16	—	—	—	—	—
1970–71	Buffalo Sabres	NHL	3	0	0	0	2	—	—	—	—	—
1971–72	Salt Lake Golden Eagles	WHL	64	1	31	32	10	—	—	—	—	—
1971–72	Buffalo Sabres	NHL	9	0	0	0	2	—	—	—	—	—
1972–73	Buffalo Sabres	NHL	42	0	7	7	8	6	0	0	0	0
1973–74	Buffalo Sabres	NHL	67	2	12	14	8	—	—	—	—	—
1974–75	Vancouver Blazers	WHA	60	3	14	17	10	—	—	—	—	—
1975–76	Calgary Cowboys	WHA	58	2	4	6	22	10	0	6	6	6
1976–77	Calgary Cowboys	WHA	80	9	24	33	30	—	—	—	—	—
1977–78	Hampton Gulls	AHL	26	0	9	9	11	—	—	—	—	—
1977–78	Springfield Indians	AHL	8	0	5	5	4	—	—	—	—	—
1977–78	Birmingham Bulls	WHA	11	1	0	1	0	—	—	—	—	—
1977–78	Houston Aeros	WHA	—	—	—	—	—	6	1	1	2	0
1978–79	Winnipeg Jets	WHA	68	3	22	25	12	10	1	1	2	4
1979–80	Birmingham Bulls	CHL	63	3	14	17	20	4	0	2	2	2
1980–81	Birmingham Bulls	CHL	41	2	2	4	26	—	—	—	—	—
WHA totals			277	18	64	82	74	26	2	8	10	10
NHL totals			189	5	26	31	28	12	0	0	0	0
