= Gavin Kirk (ice hockey) =

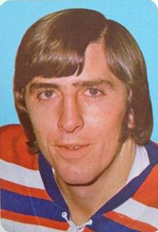
- Born: December 6, 1951 (age 74) London, England, UK
- Height: 5 ft 10 in (178 cm)
- Weight: 175 lb (79 kg; 12 st 7 lb)
- Position: Centre
- Shot: Left
- Played for: Ottawa Nationals; Toronto Toros; Calgary Cowboys; Birmingham Bulls; Edmonton Oilers
- NHL draft: 37th overall, 1971; Toronto Maple Leafs
- Playing career: 1971–1979

Gavin Kirk (born December 6, 1951) is a British former professional ice hockey player who played 422 games in the World Hockey Association. He played with the Ottawa Nationals, Toronto Toros, Calgary Cowboys, Birmingham Bulls, and Edmonton Oilers. As a youth, he played in the 1964 Quebec International Pee-Wee Hockey Tournament with a minor ice hockey team from Don Mills. He was drafted in the third round of the 1971 draft by the Toronto Maple Leafs but decided to focus his studies with Loyola College. When the WHA came around in 1972, he found a place with the Ottawa Nationals and subsequently played in six of the seven WHA seasons; he finished 31st in games played in league history.

== Career statistics ==
=== Regular season and playoffs ===
| | | | Regular season | | | | | Playoffs |
| Season | Team | League | GP | G | A | Pts | PIM | GP | G | A | Pts | PIM |
|---|---|---|---|---|---|---|---|---|---|---|---|---|
| 1968–69 | Markham Seal-A-Wax | MJBHL | — | — | — | — | — | — | — | — | — | — |
| 1969–70 | Toronto Marlboros | OHA | 53 | 17 | 33 | 50 | 40 | — | — | — | — | — |
| 1970–71 | Toronto Marlboros | OHA | 62 | 38 | 69 | 107 | 101 | — | — | — | — | — |
| 1971–72 | Phoenix Roadrunners | WHL | 3 | 1 | 2 | 3 | 2 | — | — | — | — | — |
| 1972–73 | Ottawa Nationals | WHA | 78 | 28 | 40 | 68 | 54 | 5 | 2 | 3 | 5 | 12 |
| 1973–74 | Toronto Toros | WHA | 78 | 20 | 48 | 68 | 44 | 12 | 2 | 4 | 6 | 4 |
| 1974–75 | Toronto Toros | WHA | 78 | 15 | 58 | 73 | 69 | 6 | 5 | 6 | 11 | 2 |
| 1975–76 | Calgary Cowboys | WHA | 15 | 7 | 8 | 15 | 14 | 10 | 4 | 6 | 10 | 19 |
| 1975–76 | Toronto Toros | WHA | 62 | 28 | 38 | 66 | 32 | — | — | — | — | — |
| 1976–77 | Edmonton Oilers | WHA | 52 | 8 | 28 | 36 | 16 | 5 | 1 | 0 | 1 | 4 |
| 1976–77 | Birmingham Bulls | WHA | 29 | 9 | 18 | 27 | 34 | — | — | — | — | — |
| 1977–78 | Philadelphia Firebirds | AHL | 59 | 21 | 26 | 47 | 32 | 4 | 0 | 1 | 1 | 2 |
| 1978–79 | Birmingham Bulls | WHA | 30 | 1 | 5 | 6 | 16 | — | — | — | — | — |
| 1983–84 | Flamboro Real McCoy's | OHASr | ? | ? | ? | ? | ? | — | — | — | — | — |
| WHA totals | | | 422 | 116 | 243 | 359 | 279 | 38 | 14 | 19 | 33 | 41 |
