= Dave Gilmour (ice hockey, born 1950) =

Canadian ice hockey player

- Born: November 14, 1950 (age 75) Kingston, Ontario, Canada
- Height: 5 ft 9 in (175 cm)
- Weight: 165 lb (75 kg; 11 st 11 lb)
- Position: Left wing
- Played for: Calgary Cowboys
- NHL draft: 72nd overall, 1970; Vancouver Canucks
- Playing career: 1970–1976

Dave Gilmour (born November 14, 1950) is a Canadian former professional ice hockey player who played one game in the World Hockey Association with the Calgary Cowboys during the 1975–76 WHA season.

== Career ==
Gilmour was selected by the Vancouver Canucks in the sixth round (72nd overall) of the 1970 NHL Amateur Draft. He was then assigned to the team's American Hockey League affiliate, the Rochester Americans.

== Personal life ==
Gilmour is the older brother of former NHL player Doug Gilmour.

== Career statistics ==
			Regular season					Playoffs
Season	Team	League	GP	G	A	Pts	PIM	GP	G	A	Pts	PIM
1967–68	Peterborough Petes	OHA-Jr.	7	2	2	4	2	—	—	—	—	—
1968–69	Peterborough Petes	OHA-Jr.	10	1	1	2	0	—	—	—	—	—
1968–69	Hamilton Red Wings	OHA-Jr.	45	16	27	43	13	—	—	—	—	—
1969–70	Hamilton Red Wings	OHA-Jr.	17	9	13	22	18	—	—	—	—	—
1969–70	London Knights	OHA-Jr.	30	11	11	22	18	—	—	—	—	—
1970–71	Rochester Americans	AHL	31	3	9	12	8	—	—	—	—	—
1971–72	Kingston Aces	OHA-Sr.	19	7	9	16	13	—	—	—	—	—
1972–73	Salt Lake Golden Eagles	WHL-Sr.	49	8	9	17	24	3	0	1	1	0
1973–74	Baltimore Clippers	AHL	73	34	31	65	65	6	1	3	4	10
1974–75	Baltimore Clippers	AHL	44	9	15	24	90	—	—	—	—	—
1974–75	Charlotte Checkers	SHL-Sr.	15	10	7	17	0	10	10	5	15	22
1975–76	Charlotte Checkers	SHL-Sr.	25	13	18	31	8	—	—	—	—	—
1975–76	Calgary Cowboys	WHA	1	0	0	0	0	—	—	—	—	—
1975–76	Napanee Comets	OHA Sr.	8	7	7	14	4	—	—	—	—	—
WHA totals			1	0	0	0	0	—	—	—	—	—
AHL totals			148	46	55	101	163	6	1	3	4	10
