= Wayne Wood =

Canadian ice hockey player (1951–2019)

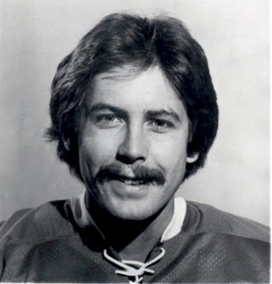
- Wood in 1978 photo
- Born: June 5, 1951 Toronto, Ontario, Canada
- Died: November 10, 2019 (aged 68) Moncton, New Brunswick, Canada
- Height: 6 ft 1 in (185 cm)
- Weight: 195 lb (88 kg; 13 st 13 lb)
- Position: Goaltender
- Caught: Left
- Played for: Vancouver Blazers; Toronto Toros; Calgary Cowboys; Birmingham Bulls
- NHL draft: 83rd overall, 1971; New York Rangers
- Playing career: 1971–1981

Wayne Wood (June 5, 1951 – November 10, 2019) was a Canadian ice hockey goaltender. He played 104 games in the World Hockey Association with the Vancouver Blazers, Toronto Toros, Calgary Cowboys, and Birmingham Bulls. He played between the pipes as a goaltender with the Montreal Junior Canadiens during a time when they won two Memorial Cups. Shortly after, Wood was drafted by the New York Rangers and then went on to enjoy an 11-year career in the WHA and AHL. During his time in the AHL, he won the Calder Cup Championship (1981) with the Adirondack Red Wings where he was MVP of the playoffs. Wood was born in Toronto, Ontario. He died in Moncton, New Brunswick on November 10, 2019.

== Career statistics ==
=== Regular season and playoffs ===
			Regular season									Playoffs
Season	Team	League	GP	W	L	T	MIN	GA	SO	GAA	SV%	GP	W	L	MIN	GA	SO	GAA	SV%
1968–69	Montreal Junior Canadiens	OHA	27	–	–	–	–	82	1	3.00	–	–	–	–	–	–	–	–	–
1969–70	Montreal Junior Canadiens	OHA	47	–	–	–	–	161	1	3.43	–	–	–	–	–	–	–	–	–
1970–71	Montreal Junior Canadiens	OHA	48	–	–	–	2901	177	1	3.66		–	–	–	–	–	–	–	–
1971–72	Providence Reds	AHL	8	–	–	–	335	18	0	3.22	–	1	–	–	–	–	–	–	–
1971–72	Omaha Knights	CHL	17	–	–	–	914	55	1	2.95		–	–	–	–	–	–	–	–
1972–73	Providence Reds	AHL	58	–	–	–	3393	171	4	3.02	–	3	–	–	–	–	–	–	–
1973–74	Providence Reds	AHL	5	–	–	–	225	11	0	2.93	–	–	–	–	–	–	–	–	–
1973–74	Albuquerque Six-Guns	CHL	14	Statistics Unavailable
1974–75	Vancouver Blazers	WHA	11	4	4	0	512	30	0	3.52	.886	–	–	–	–	–	–	–	–
1974–75	Tulsa Oilers	CHL	8	5	2	1	479	23	0	2.88		–	–	–	–	–	–	–	–
1975–76	Calgary Cowboys	WHA	19	9	3	1	880	45	1	3.07	.892	–	–	–	–	–	–	–	–
1975–76	Toronto Toros	WHA	13	6	7	0	781	62	0	4.76	.869	–	–	–	–	–	–	–	–
1976–77	Birmingham Bulls	WHA	23	7	12	0	1132	78	0	4.13	.883	–	–	–	–	–	–	–	–
1977–78	Birmingham Bulls	WHA	32	12	10	2	1551	99	1	3.83	.875	1	0	0	29	3	0	6.21
1978–79	San Diego Hawks	PHL	19	Statistics Unavailable
1978–79	Birmingham Bulls	WHA	6	1	3	0	311	21	0	4.05	.865	–	–	–	–	–	–	–	–
1979–80	Cincinnati Stingers	CHL	12	2	7	1	578	48	0	4.91	.819	–	–	–	–	–	–	–	–
1979–80	Adirondack Red Wings	AHL	10	2	7	1	566	43	0	4.56	.844	–	–	–	–	–	–	–	–
1979–80	Johnstown Red Wings	EHL	10	–	–	–	572	27	0	2.83	–	–	–	–	–	–	–	–	–
1980–81	Adirondack Red Wings	AHL	15	3	9	1	755	57	0	4.53	.857	–	–	–	–	–	–	–	–
WHA totals			104	39	39	3	5167	335	2	3.89	.879	1	0	0	29	3	0	6.21
