= Rob Walton (ice hockey) =

Canadian ice hockey player

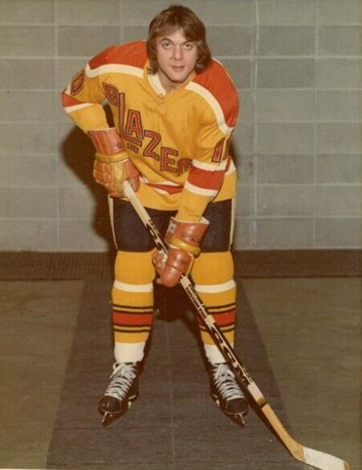
- Born: March 29, 1949 Toronto, Ontario, Canada
- Died: April 9, 2018 (aged 69)
- Height: 5 ft 9 in (175 cm)
- Weight: 170 lb (77 kg; 12 st 2 lb)
- Position: Centre
- Shot: Left
- Played for: Minnesota Fighting Saints; Vancouver Blazers; Calgary Cowboys
- NHL draft: 61st overall, 1969; Minnesota North Stars
- Playing career: 1969–1980

Robert Charles Walton (March 29, 1949 – April 9, 2018) was a Canadian professional ice hockey player in the World Hockey Association (WHA).

== Career ==
Walton was drafted in the 1969 NHL Amateur Draft by the Minnesota North Stars of the National Hockey League (NHL). He was taken in the sixth round (61st overall). Though he was drafted into the NHL, he never played there. He spent most of his career in the minors and World Hockey Association. While in the WHA, he played for the Minnesota Fighting Saints (1973–74), Vancouver Blazers (1973–1975), and Calgary Cowboys (1975–76).

== Career statistics ==
=== Regular season and playoffs ===
| | | | Regular season | | | | | Playoffs |
| Season | Team | League | GP | G | A | Pts | PIM | GP | G | A | Pts | PIM |
|---|---|---|---|---|---|---|---|---|---|---|---|---|
| 1966–67 | Oshawa Generals | OHA | 31 | 5 | 7 | 12 | 6 | — | — | — | — | — |
| 1967–68 | Oshawa Generals | OHA | 28 | 4 | 13 | 17 | 17 | — | — | — | — | — |
| 1967–68 | Peterborough Petes | OHA | 9 | 0 | 2 | 2 | 0 | — | — | — | — | — |
| 1967–68 | Port Huron Flags | IHL | 2 | 0 | 1 | 1 | 0 | — | — | — | — | — |
| 1968–69 | Niagara Falls Flyers | OHA | 54 | 20 | 54 | 74 | 24 | — | — | — | — | — |
| 1969–70 | Iowa Stars | CHL | 33 | 4 | 7 | 11 | 0 | — | — | — | — | — |
| 1970–71 | Rochester Americans | AHL | 71 | 9 | 29 | 38 | 8 | — | — | — | — | — |
| 1971–72 | Rochester Americans | AHL | 73 | 25 | 34 | 59 | 26 | — | — | — | — | — |
| 1972–73 | Seattle Totems | WHL | 72 | 40 | 61 | 101 | 43 | — | — | — | — | — |
| 1973–74 | Minnesota Fighting Saints | WHA | 45 | 8 | 23 | 31 | 24 | — | — | — | — | — |
| 1973–74 | Vancouver Blazers | WHA | 28 | 8 | 15 | 23 | 2 | — | — | — | — | — |
| 1974–75 | Vancouver Blazers | WHA | 75 | 24 | 33 | 57 | 28 | — | — | — | — | — |
| 1975–76 | Calgary Cowboys | WHA | 2 | 0 | 0 | 0 | 0 | — | — | — | — | — |
| 1975–76 | Broome County Dusters | NAHL | 34 | 13 | 28 | 41 | 34 | — | — | — | — | — |
| 1976–77 | Erie Blades | NAHL | 5 | 0 | 4 | 4 | 0 | — | — | — | — | — |
| 1976–77 | Johnstown Jets | NAHL | 36 | 16 | 28 | 44 | 40 | — | — | — | — | — |
| 1979–80 | Toledo–Muskegon | IHL | 9 | 1 | 2 | 3 | 2 | — | — | — | — | — |
| WHA totals | | | 150 | 40 | 71 | 111 | 54 | — | — | — | — | — |

== See also ==
- List of WHA seasons
- World Hockey Association
