= Bob Leiter =

Canadian ice hockey player

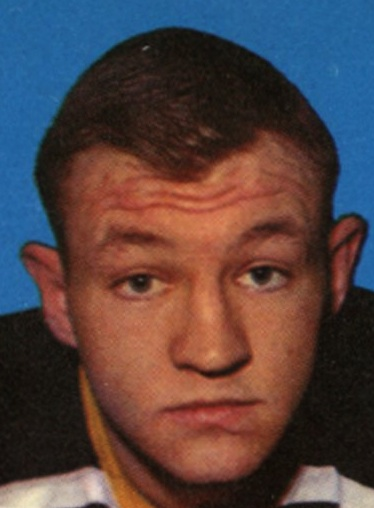
- Born: March 22, 1941 (age 85) Winnipeg, Manitoba, Canada
- Height: 5 ft 9 in (175 cm)
- Weight: 175 lb (79 kg; 12 st 7 lb)
- Position: Centre
- Shot: Left
- Played for: Boston Bruins; Pittsburgh Penguins; Atlanta Flames
- Playing career: 1959–1976

Robert Edward Leiter (born March 22, 1941) is a Canadian former professional ice hockey player, most notably for the Atlanta Flames of the National Hockey League. He spent ten seasons in the NHL and one season in the World Hockey Association between 1962 and 1976.

== Playing career ==
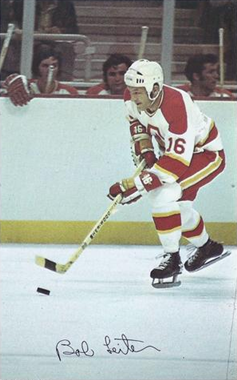
Bob Leiter in 1972 for Atlanta Flames

After a junior career that saw him playing on a Memorial Cup winner with the Winnipeg Braves in 1959, Leiter—whose rights were owned by the Boston Bruins—spent most of the next decade in the minor leagues. Derailed by a bout of tuberculosis, occasional injuries and the perception that he would serve better as a defensive player, he served two seasons for the Kingston Frontenacs of the Eastern Professional Hockey League and six with the Hershey Bears of the American Hockey League, playing only large sections of the 1963 and 1964 seasons with the Bruins.

By 1967 there was no place on the newly powerful Bruins for Leiter, and he was a fixture on the Bears, where he was a scoring leader his final four seasons. 1971, his final year in Hershey, was his best, leading the team in scoring and being named to the AHL's Second All-Star Team.

Following that season, the Pittsburgh Penguins bought Leiter from the Bruins, and he became an NHL regular at last. When expansion came in 1972, Leiter was chosen by the Atlanta Flames in the expansion draft as its 17th pick. Despite being chosen inauspiciously low, Leiter led the team in scoring in its inaugural year and was a mainstay with his two-way play. He finished second in team scoring the following season.

However, injuries and age eroded his scoring skills, and he was released by the Flames early in the 1976 season. Leiter signed with the Calgary Cowboys of the World Hockey Association to finish the season, after which he retired.

== Career statistics ==
=== Regular season and playoffs ===
			Regular season					Playoffs
Season	Team	League	GP	G	A	Pts	PIM	GP	G	A	Pts	PIM
1958–59	Winnipeg Braves	MJHL	31	14	21	35	8	8	3	4	7	4
1959–60	Winnipeg Braves	MJHL	31	22	31	53	48	4	1	2	3	2
1959–60	Winnipeg Warriors	WHL	1	0	0	0	0	—	—	—	—	—
1960–61	Winnipeg Braves	MJHL	30	20	14	34	31	3	0	3	3	0
1960–61	Winnipeg Warriors	WHL	5	1	3	4	0	—	—	—	—	—
1960–61	Winnipeg Maroons	Al-Cup	—	—	—	—	—	20	11	4	15	2
1961–62	Kingston Frontenacs	EPHL	69	24	32	56	61	11	8	8	16	8
1962–63	Boston Bruins	NHL	51	9	13	22	34	—	—	—	—	—
1962–63	Kingston Frontenacs	EPHL	20	15	23	38	17	—	—	—	—	—
1963–64	Hershey Bears	AHL	15	6	6	12	6	6	2	4	6	2
1963–64	Boston Bruins	NHL	56	6	13	19	43	—	—	—	—	—
1964–65	Boston Bruins	NHL	18	3	1	4	6	—	—	—	—	—
1965–66	Hershey Bears	AHL	45	9	23	32	16	3	1	2	3	2
1965–66	Boston Bruins	NHL	9	2	1	3	2	—	—	—	—	—
1966–67	California Seals	WHL	20	2	8	10	10	1	0	0	0	0
1967–68	Hershey Bears	AHL	72	22	48	70	57	5	0	0	0	4
1968–69	Hershey Bears	AHL	72	26	33	59	35	11	2	8	10	12
1968–69	Boston Bruins	NHL	1	0	0	0	0	—	—	—	—	—
1969–70	Hershey Bears	AHL	72	21	41	62	51	7	3	2	5	4
1970–71	Hershey Bears	AHL	72	33	36	69	26	4	0	2	2	4
1971–72	Pittsburgh Penguins	NHL	78	14	17	31	18	4	3	0	3	0
1972–73	Atlanta Flames	NHL	78	26	34	60	19	—	—	—	—	—
1973–74	Atlanta Flames	NHL	78	26	26	52	10	4	0	0	0	2
1974–75	Atlanta Flames	NHL	52	10	18	28	8	—	—	—	—	—
1975–76	Atlanta Flames	NHL	26	2	3	5	4	—	—	—	—	—
1975–76	Calgary Cowboys	WHA	51	17	17	34	8	3	2	0	2	0
WHA totals			51	17	17	34	8	3	2	0	2	0
NHL totals			447	98	126	224	144	8	3	0	3	2

== Awards and achievements ==
- Turnbull Cup MJHL Championship (1959)
- Memorial Cup Championship (1959)
- AHL Second All-Star Team (1971)
- Honoured Member of the Manitoba Hockey Hall of Fame
