= Larry Israelson =

Canadian ice hockey player

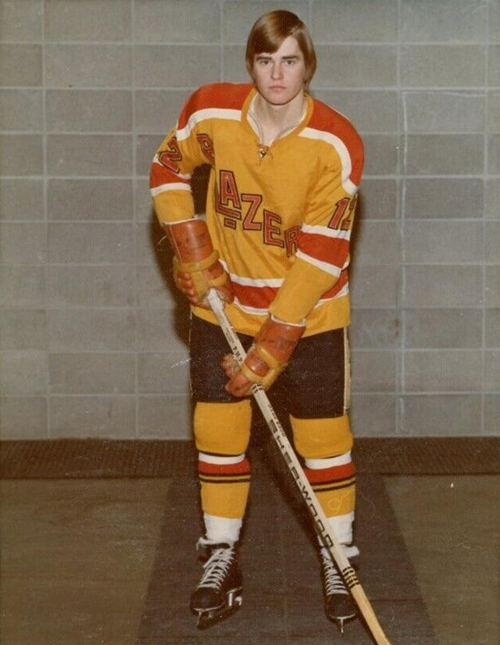
- Israelson in 1974 photo
- Born: August 2, 1952 (age 73) Didsbury, Alberta, Canada
- Height: 6 ft 1 in (185 cm)
- Weight: 174 lb (79 kg; 12 st 6 lb)
- Position: Left wing
- Shot: Left
- Played for: Vancouver Blazers; Calgary Cowboys
- Playing career: 1974–1977

Larry Israelson (born August 2, 1952) is a Canadian retired professional ice hockey forward. He played 105 games in the World Hockey Association with the Vancouver Blazers and Calgary Cowboys.

Israelson was born in Didsbury, Alberta.

== Career statistics ==
| | | | Regular season | | | | | Playoffs |
| Season | Team | League | GP | G | A | Pts | PIM | GP | G | A | Pts | PIM |
|---|---|---|---|---|---|---|---|---|---|---|---|---|
| 1970–71 | University of Notre Dame | NCAA | 30 | 2 | 1 | 3 | 4 | — | — | — | — | — |
| 1971–72 | University of Notre Dame | NCAA | 34 | 5 | 3 | 8 | 10 | — | — | — | — | — |
| 1972–73 | University of Notre Dame | NCAA | 33 | 13 | 11 | 24 | 20 | — | — | — | — | — |
| 1973–74 | University of Notre Dame | NCAA | 36 | 21 | 14 | 35 | 16 | — | — | — | — | — |
| 1974–75 | Vancouver Blazers | WHA | 46 | 12 | 9 | 21 | 10 | — | — | — | — | — |
| 1974–75 | Tulsa Oilers | CHL | 39 | 13 | 15 | 28 | 42 | — | — | — | — | — |
| 1975–76 | Calgary Cowboys | WHA | 57 | 10 | 22 | 32 | 26 | 3 | 0 | 0 | 0 | 0 |
| 1975–76 | Springfield Indians | AHL | 14 | 5 | 4 | 9 | 2 | — | — | — | — | — |
| 1976–77 | Calgary Cowboys | WHA | 2 | 0 | 0 | 0 | 0 | — | — | — | — | — |
| 1976–77 | Tidewater Sharks | SHL-Sr. | 38 | 15 | 14 | 29 | 49 | — | — | — | — | — |
| 1976–77 | Erie Blades | NAHL-Sr. | 22 | 4 | 6 | 10 | 7 | 9 | 5 | 8 | 13 | 7 |
| 1977–78 | VEU Feldkirch | Austria | 6 | 3 | 2 | 5 | 6 | — | — | — | — | — |
| 1977–78 | HC Asiago | Italy | — | 27 | — | — | — | — | — | — | — | — |
| WHA totals | | | 105 | 22 | 31 | 53 | 36 | 3 | 0 | 0 | 0 | 0 |
