= Ray Delorenzi =

Canadian ice hockey player

- Born: June 14, 1952 (age 74) Sault Ste. Marie, Ontario, Canada
- Height: 5 ft 11 in (180 cm)
- Weight: 185 lb (84 kg; 13 st 3 lb)
- Position: Right wing
- Shot: Right
- Played for: WHA; Vancouver Blazers; Calgary Cowboys; CHL; Tulsa Oilers; NAHL; Johnstown Jets
- NHL draft: Undrafted
- Playing career: 1974–1976

Ray Delorenzi (born June 14, 1952) is a retired professional ice hockey player who played in 42 games in the World Hockey Association with the Vancouver Blazers and Calgary Cowboys.

== Career statistics ==
=== Regular season and playoffs ===
			Regular season					Playoffs
Season	Team	League	GP	G	A	Pts	PIM	GP	G	A	Pts	PIM
1969–70	Sault Ste. Marie Greyhounds	NOJHL	29	11	16	27	26	––	––	––	––	––
1970–71	Sault Ste. Marie Greyhounds	NOJHL	––	54	38	92	33	––	––	––	––	––
1971–72	Notre Dame	WCHA	33	10	14	24	22	––	––	––	––	––
1972–73	Notre Dame	WCHA	37	24	20	44	61	––	––	––	––	––
1973–74	Notre Dame	WCHA	35	21	25	46	18	––	––	––	––	––
1974–75	Vancouver Blazers	WHA	3	0	0	0	0	––	––	––	––	––
1974–75	Tulsa Oilers	CHL	57	12	12	24	69	2	0	0	0	0
1975–76	Calgary Cowboys	WHA	39	8	12	20	4	––	––	––	––	––
1975–76	Johnstown Jets	NAHL	26	7	12	19	16	9	3	0	3	2
WHA totals			42	8	12	20	4	—	—	—	—	—

== Awards and honors ==
Award	Year
All-WCHA Second team	1973–74
