= François Lacombe =

Canadian ice hockey player (born 1948)

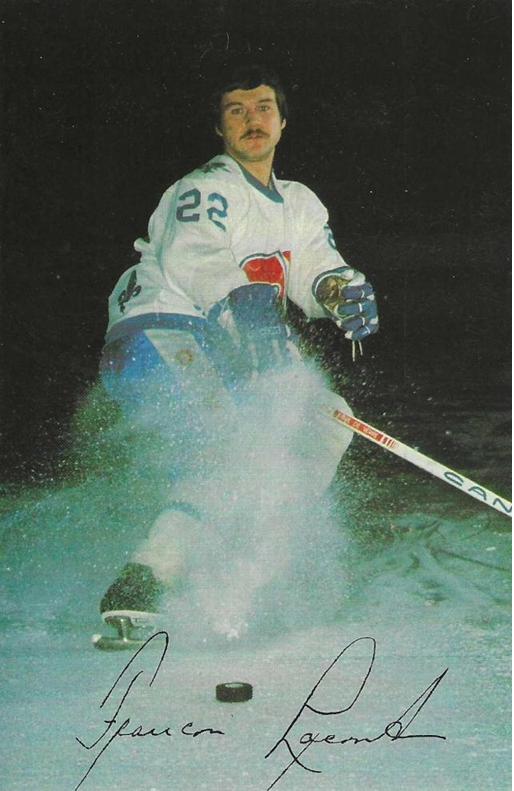
- Born: February 24, 1948 (age 78) Lachine, Quebec, Canada
- Height: 5 ft 10 in (178 cm)
- Weight: 185 lb (84 kg; 13 st 3 lb)
- Position: Defence
- Shot: Left
- Played for: Oakland Seals; Buffalo Sabres; Quebec Nordiques; Calgary Cowboys
- Playing career: 1968–1980

François Lacombe (born February 24, 1948) is a Canadian former professional ice hockey defenceman, who played in the National Hockey League (NHL) and World Hockey Association (WHA) between 1968 and 1980. He spent parts of three seasons in the NHL with the Oakland Seals and Buffalo Sabres before moving to the WHA and playing for the Quebec Nordiques and Calgary Cowboys, playing briefly for the Nordiques again when they joined the NHL.

== Professional hockey career ==
In 1970 Lacombe was traded to the Montreal Canadiens along with California's first draft pick in 1971 (the Canadiens chose Guy Lafleur) for Ernie Hicke and Montreal's first round pick. The trade is considered one of the worst of all time.

After short stints in the NHL with the Oakland Seals and Buffalo Sabres, Lacombe spent the majority of his career, in the WHA, with the Quebec Nordiques, plus a single season with the Calgary Cowboys. He played 3 games for Quebec in the NHL following the NHL–WHA merger.

Lacombe played a total of 78 regular-season NHL games, scoring two goals and adding 17 assists. He also appeared in 3 playoff games with Oakland in the 1969 Stanley Cup Playoffs, scoring one goal. Meanwhile, Lacombe played in 440 WHA games, scoring 38 goals and adding 139 assists. He appeared in 54 Avco Cup playoff games in the WHA, scoring five goals and tallying ten assists. So desperate was Lacombe to win a championship that he was quoted after Game 4 of the 1977 Avco Cup Final as willing to "give my life and my wife to win this series." His only goal scored in the series was in Game 4 when he tied it in the second period of a game the Nordiques later won, but he also provided three assists in the series, which included two in the 8-2 victory in Game 7.

== Minor hockey ==
Lacombe is now coaching in Châteauguay with the Châteauguay Midget AAA Patriotes. He was arrested on March 12, 2008, after allegedly throwing a garbage can at a player on an opposing team sparking a bench clearing brawl. The charges were later dropped.

== Career statistics ==
=== Regular season and playoffs ===
			Regular season					Playoffs
Season	Team	League	GP	G	A	Pts	PIM	GP	G	A	Pts	PIM
1965–66	Lachine Maroons	QJHL	40	2	14	16	70	—	—	—	—	—
1966–67	Lachine Maroons	QJHL	—	—	—	—	—	—	—	—	—	—
1967–68	Montreal Junior Canadiens	OHA	51	1	10	11	59	11	0	3	3	4
1968–69	Oakland Seals	NHL	72	2	16	18	50	3	1	0	1	0
1969–70	Oakland Seals	NHL	2	0	0	0	0	—	—	—	—	—
1969–70	Providence Reds	AHL	70	9	16	25	64	—	—	—	—	—
1970–71	Buffalo Sabres	NHL	1	0	1	1	2	—	—	—	—	—
1970–71	Salt Lake Golden Eagles	WHL	70	11	39	50	89	—	—	—	—	—
1971–72	Cincinnati Swords	AHL	35	4	10	14	26	10	1	6	7	20
1971–72	Fort Worth Wings	CHL	19	3	5	8	26	—	—	—	—	—
1971–72	Salt Lake Golden Eagles	WHL	11	2	3	5	22	—	—	—	—	—
1972–73	Quebec Nordiques	WHA	62	10	18	28	123	—	—	—	—	—
1973–74	Quebec Nordiques	WHA	71	9	26	35	41	—	—	—	—	—
1974–75	Quebec Nordiques	WHA	55	7	17	24	54	15	0	2	2	14
1974–75	Maine Nordiques	NAHL	4	0	3	3	12	—	—	—	—	—
1975–76	Calgary Cowboys	WHA	71	3	28	31	62	8	0	0	0	2
1976–77	Quebec Nordiques	WHA	81	5	22	27	86	17	4	3	7	16
1977–78	Quebec Nordiques	WHA	22	1	7	8	12	10	1	4	5	2
1978–79	Quebec Nordiques	WHA	78	3	21	24	44	4	0	1	1	7
1979–80	Quebec Nordiques	NHL	3	0	0	0	2	—	—	—	—	—
1979–80	Syracuse Firebirds	AHL	50	3	26	29	34	1	0	0	0	0
WHA totals			440	38	139	177	422	54	5	10	15	41
NHL totals			78	2	17	19	54	3	1	0	1	0
