= Wally Olds =

American ice hockey player (1949–2009)

- Born: August 17, 1949 Warroad, Minnesota, U.S.
- Died: January 11, 2009 (aged 59)
- Height: 6 ft 2 in (188 cm)
- Weight: 200 lb (91 kg; 14 st 4 lb)
- Position: Defense
- Shot: Right
- Played for: New York Raiders; Calgary Cowboys
- National team: United States
- NHL draft: 57th overall, 1969; Detroit Red Wings
- Playing career: 1971–1982
Medal record
Men's ice hockey
Representing United States
Olympic Games
Silver medal – second place	1972 Sapporo	Team

Walter Raymond Olds (August 17, 1949 – January 11, 2009) was an ice hockey player who played three seasons in the World Hockey Association for the New York Raiders and Calgary Cowboys between 1973 and 1976. He was also part of the Chicago Cougars' organization, but never played for them.

== Early life ==
Olds was born in Warroad, Minnesota, and raised in Baudette, Minnesota. As an amateur, he played for the Minnesota Golden Gophers men's ice hockey team, where he was an all-American defenseman. He was a member of United States Olympic team at the 1972 Winter Olympics, where he earned a silver medal.

== Career ==
Olds was drafted 57th overall by the Detroit Red Wings of the NHL in the 1969 NHL Amateur Draft but never played in the National Hockey League due to his strong opposition to fighting, choosing instead to sign with the Raiders of the rival WHA.

Olds left North American professional hockey following the 1975–76 season and moved to Europe, where he continued playing for eight years in Austria (1976–77), Germany (1977–80), Switzerland (1980–81), Sweden (1981–82), and Norway (1982–83). He was recalled by the US national team for the 1977, 1979 and 1981 Ice Hockey World Championships tournaments.

== Career statistics ==
=== Regular season and playoffs ===
			Regular season					Playoffs
Season	Team	League	GP	G	A	Pts	PIM	GP	G	A	Pts	PIM
1968–69	University of Minnesota	WCHA	31	6	12	18	6	––	––	––	––	––
1969–70	University of Minnesota	WCHA	33	4	10	14	14	––	––	––	––	––
1970–71	University of Minnesota	WCHA	32	11	14	25	14	––	––	––	––	––
1971–72	U.S. Olympic Team	Intl	44	12	13	25	2	––	––	––	––	––
1972–73	Long Island Ducks	EHL	20	2	8	10	7	2	0	0	0	0
1972–73	New York Raiders	WHA	61	5	7	12	4	––	––	––	––	––
1973–74	Long Island Cougars	NAHL	67	17	36	53	43	17	5	9	14	16
1974–75	Oklahoma City Blazers	CHL	5	0	6	6	2	2	0	0	0	2
1974–75	Hampton Gulls	SHL	71	19	61	80	45	13	1	7	8	4
1975–76	Calgary Cowboys	WHA	28	0	5	5	6	9	0	2	2	4
1975–76	Springfield Indians	AHL	35	2	17	19	37	––	––	––	––	––
1981–82	Vastra Frolunda HC	SEL	35	7	7	14	12	––	––	––	––	––
WHA totals			89	5	12	17	10	9	0	2	2	4

== Personal life ==
Olds died of colon cancer on January 11, 2009.

== Awards and honors ==
Award	Year
All-WCHA Second Team	1969–70
AHCA West All-American	1969–70
All-WCHA Second Team	1970–71
