= Erik Westrum =

American ice hockey player

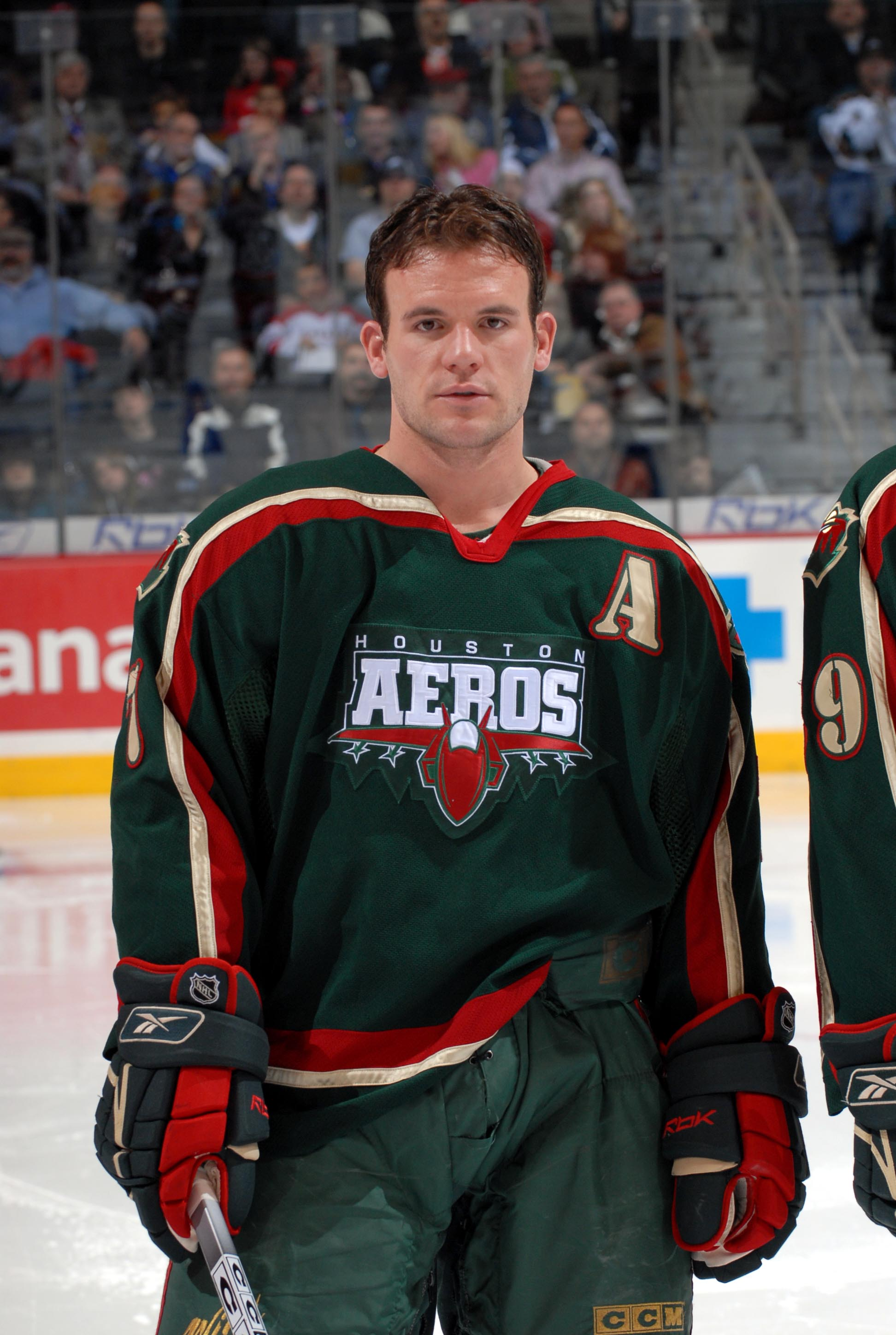
- Westrum with the Houston Aeros during the 2005-06 season
- Born: July 26, 1979 (age 47) Minneapolis, Minnesota, USA
- Height: 6 ft 0 in (183 cm)
- Weight: 204 lb (93 kg; 14 st 8 lb)
- Position: Center
- Shot: Left
- Played for: Phoenix Coyotes; Minnesota Wild; Toronto Maple Leafs; HC Ambrì-Piotta
- National team: United States
- NHL draft: 187th overall, 1998; Phoenix Coyotes
- Playing career: 2001–2012

Erik Clinton Westrum (born July 26, 1979 in Minneapolis, Minnesota) is an American former professional ice hockey center who played in the National Hockey League (NHL) for the Phoenix Coyotes, Minnesota Wild, and Toronto Maple Leafs. He is the son of Pat Westrum, who played several seasons in the World Hockey Association.

== Playing career ==
Westrum was drafted by the Phoenix Coyotes with their 7th pick, 187th overall, in the 1998 NHL entry draft. At the time he was playing in the NCAA for the University of Minnesota. Erik played the next four years with the Gophers. After completing his college career he moved to the Springfield Falcons of the AHL for the 2001/2002 season. With the Falcons he played 199 games, scoring 106 points, 37 goals and 69 assists.

Westrum made his NHL debut with Phoenix during the 2003–04 NHL season, playing 15 games with 2 points, one goal and one assist. After the NHL season he played an important role in helping Team USA win the bronze medal in the 2004 Men's World Ice Hockey Championships in Prague, Czech Republic. He scored the winning goal to secure the Bronze medal in a shootout while leading the tournament in face-off percentage and was one of the tournament leaders in scoring.

After making an impact with the Phoenix Coyotes in the 2003-2004 NHL season, Westrum was forced to sign a contract with the Utah Grizzlies in the AHL due to the 2004 NHL lockout. With this team he played 80 games with 18 goals and 15 assists, for a total of 33 points. In the season 2005–06 Erik Westrum signed a two-way contract with Minnesota Wild in the NHL after a trade sent him from Phoenix and to his home state of Minnesota. The Wild exchanged Zbynek Michalek for the Coyote's Erik Westrum. But the second experience in the top North America league lasted for only 10 games with one assist. He finished the season with the Wild's farm team, the Houston Aeros. He played 71 games with 98 points, finishing second on the team behind Kirby Law's 110 points.

At the end of 2006 season he signed as a free agent with the Toronto Maple Leafs in July, 2006, joining Minnesota Gophers teammate John Pohl, already with the Leafs. With Toronto, Westrum played two games scoring no points. As Captain of the Leafs top farm-team, the Toronto Marlies in the American Hockey League, he finished as the team's top scorer with 58 points (23 goals and 35 assist).

After six professional seasons in North America Westrum signed his first European contract in the Swiss League with the HC Ambri-Piotta. After an explosive start with Ambri-Piotta he signed a four-year contract extension on May 15, 2009. In the first year in Ambrì he became a fan favorite thanks to his spectacular league leading play.

== International play ==
Medal record

Representing United States

Ice hockey

World Championships
Bronze medal – third place	2004 Prague	

He has represented Team USA at the 2004 Men's World Ice Hockey Championships where Team USA won the bronze medal. Westrum scored the game-winning goal in a shootout to secure the Bronze medal against Slovakia and his future teammate Marian Gaborik of the Minnesota Wild.

== Career statistics ==
=== Regular season and playoffs ===
			Regular season					Playoffs
Season	Team	League	GP	G	A	Pts	PIM	GP	G	A	Pts	PIM
1994–95	Apple Valley High School	HSMN	26	14	15	29	—	—	—	—	—	—
1995–96	Apple Valley High School	HSMN	26	19	37	56	—	—	—	—	—	—
1996–97	Apple Valley High School	HSMN	26	20	33	53	—	—	—	—	—	—
1997–98	University of Minnesota	WCHA	39	6	12	18	43	—	—	—	—	—
1998–99	University of Minnesota	WCHA	41	10	26	36	81	—	—	—	—	—
1999–2000	University of Minnesota	WCHA	39	27	26	53	99	—	—	—	—	—
2000–01	University of Minnesota	WCHA	42	26	35	61	84	—	—	—	—	—
2001–02	Springfield Falcons	AHL	73	13	29	42	116	—	—	—	—	—
2002–03	Springfield Falcons	AHL	70	10	22	32	65	6	0	4	4	6
2003–04	Springfield Falcons	AHL	56	14	18	32	91	—	—	—	—	—
2003–04	Phoenix Coyotes	NHL	15	1	1	2	20	—	—	—	—	—
2004–05	Utah Grizzlies	AHL	80	18	15	33	117	—	—	—	—	—
2005–06	Houston Aeros	AHL	71	34	64	98	138	8	1	7	8	20
2005–06	Minnesota Wild	NHL	10	0	1	1	2	—	—	—	—	—
2006–07	Toronto Marlies	AHL	70	23	35	58	135	—	—	—	—	—
2006–07	Toronto Maple Leafs	NHL	2	0	0	0	0	—	—	—	—	—
2007–08	HC Ambrì–Piotta	NLA	50	33	39	72	104	—	—	—	—	—
2008–09	HC Ambrì–Piotta	NLA	32	21	18	39	115	—	—	—	—	—
2009–10	HC Ambrì–Piotta	NLA	40	10	16	26	40	—	—	—	—	—
2010–11	HC Ambrì–Piotta	NLA	11	1	3	4	6	—	—	—	—	—
2011–12	HC Ambrì–Piotta	NLA	8	1	4	5	26	—	—	—	—	—
AHL totals			420	112	182	294	662	14	1	11	12	26
NHL totals			27	1	2	3	22	—	—	—	—	—
NLA totals			141	66	80	146	289	—	—	—	—	—

=== International ===
Year	Team	Event	Result	GP	G	A	Pts	PIM
2004	United States	WC	3rd place, bronze medalist(s)	9	3	2	5	6
Senior totals				9	3	2	5	6

== Awards and honors ==
Award	Year
WCHA All-Tournament Team	1999
All-WCHA Third Team	1999–00
All-WCHA First Team	2000–01
AHL First All-Star Team	2005–06, 2006–07
NLA Leading Scorer	2007–08

=== Golden Gopher Award Winners ===
- Frank Pond Rookie of the Year Award, season 1997–98.
- Dr. V. George Nagobads Unsung Hero Award second place, season 1998–99.
- John Mariucci MVP, season 1999–00.
- Tom Mohr Playoff MVP, season 1999–00.
- John Mariucci MVP, season 2000–01.
- Tom Mohr Playoff MVP, season 2000–01.
