= Bill Gratton =

Canadian ice hockey player

- Born: February 29, 1948 (age 78) Brantford, Ontario, Canada
- Height: 6 ft 3 in (191 cm)
- Weight: 200 lb (91 kg; 14 st 4 lb)
- Position: Left wing
- Played for: Calgary Cowboys
- Playing career: 1973–1978

Bill Gratton (born February 29, 1948) is a Canadian retired professional ice hockey player who played six games in the World Hockey Association with the Calgary Cowboys during the 1975–76 season. He later coached the Paris 29ers, a top tier Canadian Senior ice hockey team in Major League Hockey.

Gratton was born in Brantford, Ontario.

== Career statistics ==
=== Regular season and playoffs ===
			Regular season					Playoffs
Season	Team	League	GP	G	A	Pts	PIM	GP	G	A	Pts	PIM
1972–73	Brantford Foresters	OHASr	19	6	8	14	58	—	—	—	—	—
1973–74	Brantford Foresters	OHASr	26	10	16	26	59	—	—	—	—	—
1973–74	Broome County Dusters	NAHL	11	5	7	12	29	—	—	—	—	—
1974–75	Broome County Dusters	NAHL	70	23	20	43	62	15	4	2	6	25
1975–76	Calgary Cowboys	WHA	6	0	1	1	2	—	—	—	—	—
1975–76	Broome County Dusters	NAHL	52	15	15	30	80	—	—	—	—	—
1976–77	Brantford Alexanders	OHASr	3	2	3	5	28	—	—	—	—	—
1977–78	Cambridge Hornets	OHASr	31	16	22	38	61	—	—	—	—	—
WHA totals			6	0	1	1	2	—	—	—	—	—
