= Don Tannahill =

Canadian ice hockey player (born 1949)

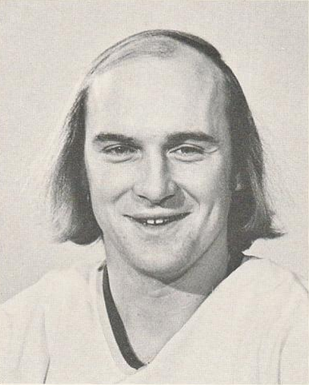
- Born: February 21, 1949 (age 77) Penetanguishene, ON, CAN
- Height: 5 ft 11 in (180 cm)
- Weight: 178 lb (81 kg; 12 st 10 lb)
- Position: Forward
- Shot: Left
- Played for: Vancouver Canucks; Minnesota Fighting Saints; Calgary Cowboys
- NHL draft: 3rd overall, 1969; Boston Bruins
- Playing career: 1969–1978

Donald Andrew Tannahill (born February 21, 1949, in Penetanguishene, Ontario) is a retired professional ice hockey player who played 222 games in the World Hockey Association (WHA) and 111 games in the National Hockey League (NHL). He played in the NHL for the Vancouver Canucks and in the WHA with the Minnesota Fighting Saints, and Calgary Cowboys. He also played for several minor league teams in a career that lasted from 1969 to 1978. Tannahill was selected third overall by the Boston Bruins in the 1969 NHL Amateur Draft, but never played for the Bruins.

== Career statistics ==
			Regular season					Playoffs
Season	Team	League	GP	G	A	Pts	PIM	GP	G	A	Pts	PIM
1966–67	Niagara Falls Flyers	OHA-Jr.	45	8	13	21	15	13	0	4	4	0
1967–68	Niagara Falls Flyers	OHA-Jr.	54	29	49	78	30	18	7	11	18	18
1968–69	Niagara Falls Flyers	OHA-Jr.	54	48	41	89	131	14	17	6	23	10
1969–70	Oklahoma City Blazers	CHL	27	10	12	22	14	—	—	—	—	—
1970–71	Oklahoma City Blazers	CHL	69	27	36	63	22	5	2	2	4	0
1971–72	Boston Braves	AHL	76	30	44	74	23	9	5	1	6	2
1972–73	Vancouver Canucks	NHL	78	22	21	43	21	—	—	—	—	—
1973–74	Vancouver Canucks	NHL	33	8	12	20	4	—	—	—	—	—
1974–75	Minnesota Fighting Saints	WHA	72	23	30	53	20	10	2	4	6	0
1975–76	Calgary Cowboys	WHA	78	25	24	49	10	10	2	5	7	8
1976–77	Calgary Cowboys	WHA	72	10	22	32	4	—	—	—	—	—
1977–78	Salt Lake Golden Eagles	CHL	7	3	3	6	0	—	—	—	—	—
1977–78	Barrie Flyers	OHA-Sr.	23	10	16	26	0	—	—	—	—	—
WHA totals			222	58	76	134	34	20	4	9	13	8
NHL totals			111	30	33	63	25	—	—	—	—	—

Preceded by Danny Schock	Boston Bruins first-round draft pick 1969	Succeeded by Frank Spring
