= Butch Deadmarsh =

Canadian former ice hockey left wing

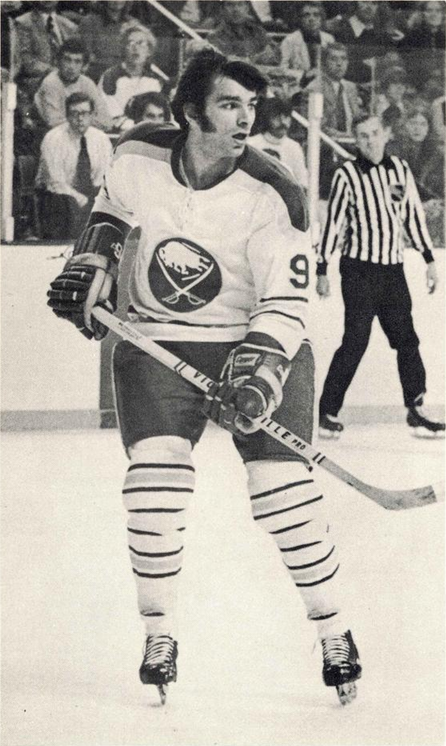
- Born: April 5, 1950 (age 76) Trail, British Columbia, Canada
- Height: 5 ft 11 in (180 cm)
- Weight: 186 lb (84 kg; 13 st 4 lb)
- Position: Left wing
- Shot: Left
- Played for: Buffalo Sabres; Atlanta Flames; Kansas City Scouts; Vancouver Blazers; Calgary Cowboys; Minnesota Fighting Saints; Edmonton Oilers; Cincinnati Stingers
- NHL draft: 15th overall, 1970; Buffalo Sabres
- Playing career: 1970–1978

Ernest Charles “Butch” Deadmarsh (born April 5, 1950) is a Canadian former professional ice hockey left winger. Deadmarsh was drafted in the second round, 15th overall, of the 1970 NHL amateur draft by the Buffalo Sabres, the second player the franchise ever drafted after Gil Perreault. He played in the National Hockey League (NHL) for the Sabres, Atlanta Flames, and Kansas City Scouts. He also played in the World Hockey Association (WHA) for the Vancouver Blazers, Calgary Cowboys, Minnesota Fighting Saints, Edmonton Oilers, and Cincinnati Stingers.

== Professional career ==
Deadmarsh started his professional career in the 1970–71 season for Buffalo's then-farm team, the Salt Lake Golden Eagles of the Western Hockey League (WHL). He made his NHL debut that year, and played a handful of games the following year, while spending most of his time with the Cincinnati Swords of the American Hockey League (AHL), leading his team in goals. After a strong start with the Swords in 1973, he was called up to Buffalo, being traded later that season to the Atlanta Flames for Norm Gratton.

After being claimed from the Flames by the Kansas City Scouts in the 1974 NHL expansion draft, Deadmarsh scored the game-winning goal in Kansas City's first-ever NHL victory versus the Washington Capitals in November 1974.

However, the Scouts sold his rights later that year to the Vancouver Blazers of the World Hockey Association (WHA), the first-ever such transaction, after Deadmarsh demanded to be dealt there, having signed a contract with the Blazers to take place after the 1974–75 season. The Blazers relocated to Calgary the following year, and Deadmarsh had his best professional season, finishing fourth in team scoring with 26 goals and 28 assists, as well as leading the Cowboys in penalty minutes with 196.

In his NHL career, Deadmarsh played in 137 games, scoring twelve goals and adding five assists. He played in 255 WHA games, scoring 63 goals and adding 66 assists. He is a second cousin of former NHL player Adam Deadmarsh.

== Career statistics ==
=== Regular season and playoffs ===
			Regular season					Playoffs
Season	Team	League	GP	G	A	Pts	PIM	GP	G	A	Pts	PIM
1966–67	Kelowna Buckaroos	BCJHL	—	—	—	—	—	—	—	—	—	—
1967–68	Kelowna Buckaroos	BCJHL	—	—	—	—	—	—	—	—	—	—
1968–69	Brandon Wheat Kings	WCHL	47	19	23	42	130	5	2	2	4	—
1969–70	Brandon Wheat Kings	WCHL	54	37	33	70	301	4	3	5	8	20
1970–71	Buffalo Sabres	NHL	10	0	0	0	9	—	—	—	—	—
1970–71	Salt Lake Golden Eagles	WHL	59	11	9	20	128	—	—	—	—	—
1971–72	Buffalo Sabres	NHL	12	1	1	2	4	—	—	—	—	—
1971–72	Cincinnati Swords	AHL	64	34	27	61	145	10	6	8	14	33
1972–73	Buffalo Sabres	NHL	34	1	1	2	26	—	—	—	—	—
1972–73	Cincinnati Swords	AHL	12	7	4	11	20	—	—	—	—	—
1972–73	Atlanta Flames	NHL	19	1	0	1	8	—	—	—	—	—
1973–74	Atlanta Flames	NHL	42	6	1	7	89	4	0	0	0	17
1974–75	Kansas City Scouts	NHL	20	3	2	5	19	—	—	—	—	—
1974–75	Vancouver Blazers	WHA	38	7	8	15	128	—	—	—	—	—
1975–76	Calgary Cowboys	WHA	79	26	28	54	196	8	0	1	1	14
1976–77	Minnesota Fighting Saints	WHA	35	9	4	13	51	—	—	—	—	—
1976–77	Calgary Cowboys	WHA	38	13	17	30	77	—	—	—	—	—
1977–78	Edmonton Oilers	WHA	20	1	3	4	32	—	—	—	—	—
1977–78	Cincinnati Stingers	WHA	45	7	6	13	86	—	—	—	—	—
NHL totals			137	12	5	17	155	4	0	0	0	17
WHA totals			255	63	66	129	570	8	0	1	1	14
