= George Pesut =

Canadian ice hockey player

- Born: June 17, 1953 (age 72) Saskatoon, Saskatchewan, Canada
- Height: 6 ft 1 in (185 cm)
- Weight: 197 lb (89 kg; 14 st 1 lb)
- Position: Defence
- Shot: Left
- Played for: California Golden Seals; Calgary Cowboys (WHA)
- NHL draft: 24th overall, 1973; St. Louis Blues
- WHA draft: 24th overall, 1973; Cleveland Crusaders
- Playing career: 1973–1993

George Matthew Pesut (born June 17, 1953) is a Canadian former professional ice hockey player. He played 92 games in the National Hockey League for the California Golden Seals over two seasons. He also played 17 games in the World Hockey Association with the Calgary Cowboys during the 1976–77 season. The rest of his career was mainly spent in the minor leagues and in Europe.

== Early years ==
Pesut began his hockey career in the province of Saskatchewan, Canada, in the city of Saskatoon. He played his minor hockey in the Saskatoon system and eventually began his junior career with the A level Saskatoon Macs of the Saskatchewan Junior Hockey League. Pesut entered the major junior hockey ranks in the 1971–72 season with the Victoria Cougars of the Western Canada Hockey League.

== Professional career ==
George Pesut was drafted early in the second round at #24 of the 1973 NHL Amateur Draft by St. Louis Blues. At the same time, Pesut was also drafted by the fledgling World Hockey Association's Cleveland Crusaders, at exactly the same draft position. However, Pesut opted begin his professional career in the NHL and to accept a contract offer with the Blues.

After attending the St. Louis Blues training camp in 1973, he was sent down to begin and develop his pro career with the Blues' minor league affiliate, the Denver Spurs in the Western Hockey League. He played only 7 games before being traded in November 1973 to the Philadelphia Flyers for Bob Stumpf. In his first full NHL season in 1975 with the California Golden Seals, Pesut put up a respectable 13 points in 47 games.

== Career statistics ==
=== Regular season and playoffs ===
			Regular season					Playoffs
Season	Team	League	GP	G	A	Pts	PIM	GP	G	A	Pts	PIM
1970–71	Saskatoon Macs	SAHA	—	—	—	—	—	—	—	—	—	—
1971–72	Victoria Cougars	WCHL	38	3	13	16	83	—	—	—	—	—
1971–72	Flin Flon Bombers	WCHL	25	3	8	11	73	—	—	—	—	—
1971–72	Saskatoon Blades	WCHL	2	0	0	0	4	—	—	—	—	—
1972–73	Saskatoon Blades	WCHL	68	12	25	37	98	—	—	—	—	—
1973–74	Denver Spurs	WHL	7	0	2	2	19	—	—	—	—	—
1973–74	Richmond Robins	AHL	38	3	5	8	4	—	—	—	—	—
1974–75	Richmond Robins	AHL	8	0	1	1	7	—	—	—	—	—
1974–75	California Golden Seals	NHL	47	0	13	13	73	—	—	—	—	—
1975–76	Salt Lake Golden Eagles	CHL	7	2	0	2	10	—	—	—	—	—
1975–76	California Golden Seals	NHL	45	3	9	12	57	—	—	—	—	—
1976–77	Calgary Cowboys	WHA	17	2	0	2	2	—	—	—	—	—
1976–77	Tidewater Sharks	SHL	14	4	6	10	19	—	—	—	—	—
1976–77	Erie Blades	NAHL	25	5	7	12	62	9	1	2	3	6
1977–78	HC Davos	NLB	—	—	—	—	—	—	—	—	—	—
1978–79	EHC Dübendorf	NLB	—	—	—	—	—	—	—	—	—	—
1979–80	EHC Chur	NLB	28	28	20	48	100	—	—	—	—	—
1980–81	Wichita Wind	CHL	53	6	21	27	33	16	3	4	7	39
1981–82	Hamburger SV	GER-2	32	18	16	34	84	—	—	—	—	—
1982–83	EC Hannover	GER-3	22	22	23	45	60	—	—	—	—	—
1982–83	Berliner SC Preussen	GER-3	12	10	11	21	38	—	—	—	—	—
1983–84	Berliner SC Preussen	GER-2	42	16	24	40	42	—	—	—	—	—
1984–85	Berliner SC Preussen	GER-2	42	15	37	52	72	—	—	—	—	—
1985–86	Chamonix	FRA	—	—	—	—	—	—	—	—	—	—
1986–87	Berliner SC Preussen	GER-2	35	3	29	32	28	18	0	3	3	13
1987–88	ECD Iserlohn	GER	14	4	2	6	8	—	—	—	—	—
1987–88	SV Bayreuth	GER-2	6	1	6	7	10	—	—	—	—	—
1988–89	EHC 80 Nürnberg	GER-2	33	5	30	35	46	—	—	—	—	—
1989–90	EHC 80 Nürnberg	GER-2	34	8	34	42	35	—	—	—	—	—
1990–91	ECD Sauerland	GER-2	17	10	20	30	20	—	—	—	—	—
1991–92	EC Kassel	GER-2	38	9	24	33	34	—	—	—	—	—
1992–93	EC Kassel	GER-2	40	5	18	23	40	—	—	—	—	—
1993–94	EC Kassel	GER-2	7	0	0	0	0	—	—	—	—	—
WHA totals			17	2	0	2	2	—	—	—	—	—
NHL totals			92	3	22	25	130	—	—	—	—	—

== After hockey ==
Along with a career as a consultant in the mining industry, Pesut also assisted other current hockey pros or alumni with hockey schools in the British Columbia interior. In December 2024, Pesut published his memoir, "The Fourth Period-Between The Ice Sheets: Hockey on Two Continents", which chronicles his rise from junior hockey to his life in the professional ranks.

== Awards, honors and accomplishments ==
- Best Defenceman Award Western Canada Hockey League (WCHL Major Junior) 1972–73 season;
- WCHL All-Star Team, 1972–73;
- Voted the Best Defenceman in Swiss hockey three consecutive seasons;
- German Championship winner with Berlin, first team All-star for consecutive seasons in Germany.
