= Rick Jodzio =

Canadian ice hockey player

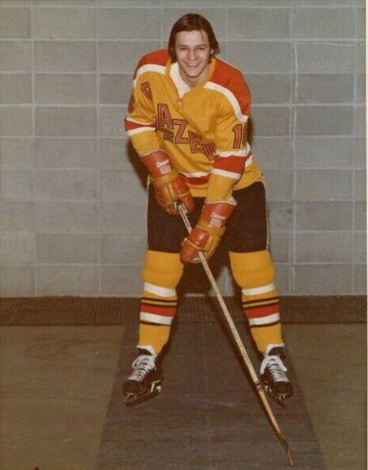
- Jodzio in 1974
- Born: June 3, 1954 (age 72) Edmonton, Alberta, Canada
- Height: 6 ft 1 in (185 cm)
- Weight: 190 lb (86 kg; 13 st 8 lb)
- Position: Left wing
- Shot: Left
- Played for: Cleveland Barons (NHL); Colorado Rockies (NHL); Calgary Cowboys (WHA); Vancouver Blazers (WHA)
- NHL draft: 153rd overall, 1974; Buffalo Sabres
- Playing career: 1974–1980

Richard Joseph Jodzio (/ˈdʒɒdziːoʊ/ JOD-zee-oh; born June 3, 1954 in Edmonton, Alberta) is a Canadian former professional ice hockey left winger. He played in the National Hockey League (NHL) with the Colorado Rockies and the Cleveland Barons; he also played in the World Hockey Association (WHA) with the Vancouver Blazers and the Calgary Cowboys.

In his NHL career, Jodzio appeared in 70 games. He scored two goals and added eight assists while collecting 71 minutes in penalties. He played in 137 WHA games, scoring 15 goals and adding 16 assists with 357 minutes in penalties.

Jodzio was a trained boxer. On April 11, 1976, in one of the hockey's most infamous moments, Jodzio attacked Quebec Nordiques star Marc Tardif with his hockey stick during a playoff game in Quebec City. Jodzio's crosscheck into the boards knocked Tardif unconscious and he repeatedly hit him as he lay helpless on the ice. Jodzio was suspended for the rest of the playoffs and charged with assault by Quebec police. After pleading guilty, Jodzio was fined $3,000.

Since the incident Tardif forgave Jodzio.

Jodzio is currently the owner of Frontline Freight, a less than truckload carrier based out of City of Industry, California.

== Career statistics ==
=== Regular season and playoffs ===
			Regular season					Playoffs
Season	Team	League	GP	G	A	Pts	PIM	GP	G	A	Pts	PIM
1972–73	Downsview Beavers	OPJAHL	21	5	9	14	39	—	—	—	—	—
1973–74	Downsview Beavers	OPJAHL	30	7	12	19	166	—	—	—	—	—
1973–74	Hamilton Red Wings	OHA	30	1	8	9	86	—	—	—	—	—
1974–75	Charlotte Checkers	SHL	37	9	8	17	109	1	0	2	2	0
1974–75	Vancouver Blazers	WHA	44	1	3	4	159	—	—	—	—	—
1975–76	Springfield Indians	AHL	24	2	3	5	37	—	—	—	—	—
1975–76	Calgary Cowboys	WHA	47	10	7	17	137	2	0	0	0	14
1976–77	Tidewater Sharks	SHL	7	3	3	6	4	—	—	—	—	—
1976–77	Calgary Cowboys	WHA	46	4	6	10	61	—	—	—	—	—
1976–77	Erie Blades	NAHL	15	5	5	10	32	9	2	7	9	21
1977–78	Colorado Rockies	NHL	32	0	5	5	28	—	—	—	—	—
1977–78	Cleveland Barons	NHL	38	2	3	5	43	—	—	—	—	—
1978–79	Oklahoma City Stars	CHL	62	4	21	25	117	—	—	—	—	—
1979–80	New Brunswick Hawks	AHL	79	13	25	38	113	17	2	4	6	43
WHA totals			137	15	16	31	357	2	0	0	0	14
NHL totals			70	2	8	10	71	—	—	—	—	—
