= Doug Lindskog =

Canadian ice hockey player (born 1955)

- Born: August 12, 1955 (age 70) Red Deer, Alberta, Canada
- Height: 6 ft 1 in (185 cm)
- Weight: 185 lb (84 kg; 13 st 3 lb)
- Position: Left wing
- Shot: Left
- Played for: Calgary Cowboys
- NHL draft: 117th overall, 1975; St. Louis Blues
- WHA draft: 106th overall, 1975; Calgary Cowboys
- Playing career: 1976–1977

Douglas P. "Doug" Lindskog (born August 12, 1955) is a Canadian retired professional ice hockey player who played two games in the World Hockey Association with the Calgary Cowboys during the 1976–77 WHA season.

== Career statistics ==
=== Regular season and playoffs ===
			Regular season					Playoffs
Season	Team	League	GP	G	A	Pts	PIM	GP	G	A	Pts	PIM
1971–72	Red Deer Rustlers	AJHL	46	16	39	55	74	—	—	—	—	—
1972–73	Red Deer Rustlers	AJHL	47	40	55	95	97	—	—	—	—	—
1973–74	University of Michigan	WCHA	26	8	13	21	30	—	—	—	—	—
1974–75	University of Michigan	WCHA	36	12	24	36	87	—	—	—	—	—
1975–76	University of Michigan	WCHA	40	19	40	59	137	—	—	—	—	—
1976–77	Tidewater Sharks	SHL	38	15	15	30	44	—	—	—	—	—
1976–77	Erie Blades	NAHL	20	4	5	9	24	4	0	2	2	2
1976–77	Calgary Cowboys	WHA	2	0	0	0	2	—	—	—	—	—
1977–78	San Diego Mariners	PHL	12	12	10	22	9	—	—	—	—	—
1977–78	Drumheller Miners	ASHL	6	5	3	8	6	—	—	—	—	—
1977–78	Calgary Trojans	ASHL	2	0	0	0	32	—	—	—	—	—
1978–79	Los Angeles Blades	PHL	21	7	13	20	54	—	—	—	—	—
WHA totals			2	0	0	0	0	—	—	—	—	—
