= Pat Westrum =

American ice hockey player (born 1948)

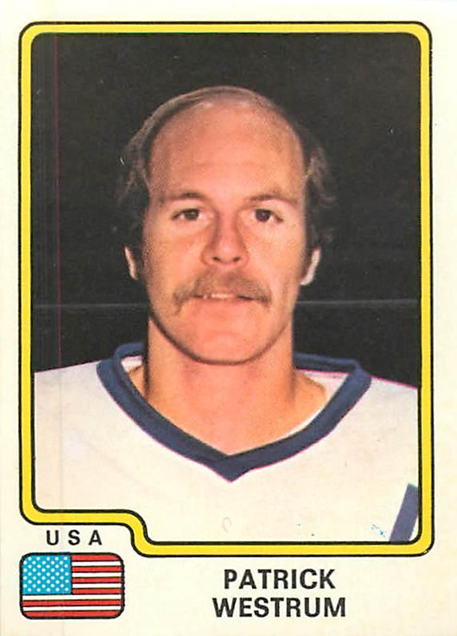
- Born: March 3, 1948 (age 78) Minneapolis, Minnesota, United States
- Height: 5 ft 11 in (180 cm)
- Weight: 181 lb (82 kg; 12 st 13 lb)
- Position: Defense
- Shot: Left
- Played for: Minnesota Fighting Saints; Calgary Cowboys; Birmingham Bulls
- National team: United States
- Playing career: 1971–1980

Patrick Delvan Westrum (born March 3, 1948) is a retired professional ice hockey defenseman who played 237 regular season games in the World Hockey Association for the Minnesota Fighting Saints, Calgary Cowboys and Birmingham Bulls between 1974 and 1978. Westrum also was a member of the United States national team at the 1978 Ice Hockey World Championship tournament in Prague. He played for the Minnesota Golden Gophers hockey team from 1967 to 1970. He joined the USA Hockey Coaching Education Program in 1995. He was an assistant coach at Apple Valley High, which won the 1996 Minnesota State High School Hockey Tournament. He served as an amateur scout for NHL teams and later became coach-in-chief for Minnesota District 6. In 2022, he won the Walter Yaciuk Award for his contributions to USA Hockey. His son, Erik, also played professional hockey, playing in the NHL with Phoenix, Minnesota and Toronto.

== Career statistics ==
=== Regular season and playoffs ===
			Regular season					Playoffs
Season	Team	League	GP	G	A	Pts	PIM	GP	G	A	Pts	PIM
1967–68	University of Minnesota	WCHA	26	0	3	3	10	—	—	—	—	—
1968–69	University of Minnesota	WCHA	31	0	4	4	25	—	—	—	—	—
1969–70	University of Minnesota	WCHA	33	3	7	10	12	—	—	—	—	—
1970–71	U.S. National Team	Intl	Statistics Unavailable
1971–72	Dayton Gems	IHL	2	0	1	1	2	—	—	—	—	—
1971–72	Des Moines Oak Leafs	IHL	22	0	8	8	29	—	—	—	—	—
1971–72	Oklahoma City Blazers	CHL	43	1	4	5	68 4	0	0	0	2
1972–73	Boston Braves	AHL	63	3	9	12	70	10	1	2	3	13
1972–73	Dayton Gems	IHL	7	0	1	1	26	—	—	—	—	—
1973–74	Boston Braves	AHL	76	3	25	28	54	—	—	—	—	—
1974–75	Johnstown Jets	NAHL	34	2	11	13	53	15	1	4	5	25
1974–75	Minnesota Fighting Saints	WHA	23	0	3	3	48	—	—	—	—	—
1975–76	Calgary Cowboys	WHA	9	0	2	2	23	6	0	1	1	19
1975–76	Minnesota Fighting Saints	WHA	54	3	10	13	98	—	—	—	—	—
1976–77	Minnesota Fighting Saints	WHA	40	1	9	10	42	—	—	—	—	—
1976–77	Birmingham Bulls	WHA	34	1	11	12	48	—	—	—	—	—
1977–78	Birmingham Bulls	WHA	77	2	10	12	97	3	0	1	1	2
1978–79	Springfield Indians	AHL	57	0	17	17	116	—	—	—	—	—
1979–80	Oklahoma City Stars	CHL	5	0	2	2	0	—	—	—	—	—
WHA totals			237	7	45	52	356	9	0	2	2	21
