= Steve Hull =

Canadian ice hockey player

- Born: August 29, 1952 (age 73) Ottawa, Ontario, Canada
- Height: 5 ft 10 in (178 cm)
- Weight: 180 lb (82 kg; 12 st 12 lb)
- Position: Right wing
- Shot: Right
- Played for: Calgary Cowboys
- Playing career: 1972–1977

Steve Hull (born August 29, 1952) is a Canadian retired professional ice hockey player who played 60 games in the World Hockey Association with the Calgary Cowboys during the 1975–76 and 1976–77 seasons. As a youth, he played in the 1964 and 1965 Quebec International Pee-Wee Hockey Tournaments with a minor ice hockey team from Ottawa.

== Career statistics ==
=== Regular season and playoffs ===
			Regular season					Playoffs
Season	Team	League	GP	G	A	Pts	PIM	GP	G	A	Pts	PIM
1968–69	Smiths Falls Bears	CJHL	40	20	18	38	32	––	––	––	––	––
1969–70	Smiths Falls Bears	CJHL	40	21	23	44	68	––	––	––	––	––
1970–71	Smiths Falls Bears	CJHL	44	34	36	70	128	––	––	––	––	––
1971–72	Smiths Falls Bears	CJHL	47	37	76	113	0	––	––	––	––	––
1972–73	Columbus Golden Seals	IHL	60	8	24	32	54	––	––	––	––	––
1973–74	Charlotte Checkers	SHL	56	20	31	51	51	12	7	9	16	6
1974–75	Charlotte Checkers	SHL	67	39	75	114	38	10	5	7	12	6
1975–76	Calgary Cowboys	WHA	58	11	15	26	6	––	––	––	––	––
1975–76	Richmond Robins	AHL	13	5	15	20	12	8	0	3	3	4
1976–77	Tidewater Sharks	SHL	8	3	1	4	4	––	––	––	––	––
1976–77	Calgary Cowboys	WHA	2	0	2	2	0	––	––	––	––	––
WHA totals			60	11	17	28	6	—	—	—	—	—
