= Derek Haas (ice hockey) =

French-Canadian ice hockey player

- Born: May 1, 1955 (age 71) Trail, British Columbia, Canada
- Height: 6 ft 0 in (183 cm)
- Weight: 170 lb (77 kg; 12 st 2 lb)
- Position: Centre
- Shot: Left
- Played for: Calgary Cowboys
- National team: France
- Playing career: 1975–1995

Derek Haas (born May 1, 1955) is a Canadian retired professional ice hockey centre who played 30 games in the World Hockey Association with the Calgary Cowboys during the 1975–76 WHA season.

== Early life and education ==
Haas was born in Trail, British Columbia. He played junior hockey with the Victoria Cougars during the 1973–1974 season.

== Career ==
From 1982 to 1995, Haas played in the Ligue Magnus in France and became a French citizen as a result, playing for the country in the 1988 Winter Olympics. Haas also played for the Springfield Indians.

== Career statistics ==
=== Regular season and playoffs ===
			Regular season					Playoffs
Season	Team	League	GP	G	A	Pts	PIM	GP	G	A	Pts	PIM
1973–74	Victoria Cougars	WCHL	67	24	33	57	33	––	––	––	––	––
1975–76	Calgary Cowboys	WHA	30	5	9	14	6	1	0	0	0	0
1975–76	Springfield Indians	AHL	42	14	16	30	6	––	––	––	––	––
1976–77	Tidewater Sharks	SHL	38	11	19	30	13	––	––	––	––	––
1976–77	Erie Blades	NAHL	33	12	13	25	6	9	4	5	9	18
1977–78	Springfield Indians	AHL	78	22	36	58	30	4	1	0	1	2
1978–79	Springfield Indians	AHL	80	15	43	58	53	––	––	––	––	––
1979–80	Cologne EC	1.GBun	29	19	15	34	34	––	––	––	––	––
1980–81	Trail Smoke Eaters	WIHL	21	21	20	41	9	––	––	––	––	––
1980–81	Springfield Indians	AHL	44	15	31	46	12	7	3	4	7	2
1988–89	Villard–de–Lans	France	40	13	24	37	24	––	––	––	––	––
1989–90	Paris FV	France	34	13	20	33	18	––	––	––	––	––
1990–91	Paris FV	France	28	15	9	24	10	4	2	0	2	2
1991–92	Clermont–Ferrand	France	Statistics Unavailable
1997–98	Angers	France	5	0	0	0	0	––	––	––	––	––
WHA totals			30	5	9	14	6	1	0	0	0	0
