= Bernie Lukowich =

Canadian ice hockey player

- Born: March 18, 1952 (age 73) North Battleford, Saskatchewan, Canada
- Height: 6 ft 0 in (183 cm)
- Weight: 190 lb (86 kg; 13 st 8 lb)
- Position: Right wing
- Shot: Right
- Played for: NHL; Pittsburgh Penguins; St. Louis Blues; WHA; Calgary Cowboys
- NHL draft: 30th overall, 1972; Pittsburgh Penguins
- Playing career: 1972–1978

Bernard Joseph Lukowich (born March 18, 1952) is a Canadian former NHL and WHA player. He played 79 games in the NHL for the Pittsburgh Penguins and the St. Louis Blues. And another 21 games for the Calgary Cowboys of the WHA.

His son is Brad Lukowich, who played in the NHL.

== Career statistics ==
=== Regular season and playoffs ===
| | | | Regular season | | | | | Playoffs |
| Season | Team | League | GP | G | A | Pts | PIM | GP | G | A | Pts | PIM |
|---|---|---|---|---|---|---|---|---|---|---|---|---|
| 1968–69 | Battleford North Stars | AAHA | — | — | — | — | — | — | — | — | — | — |
| 1968–69 | Estevan Bruins | WCHL | 3 | 0 | 0 | 0 | 0 | — | — | — | — | — |
| 1969–70 | Estevan Bruins | WCHL | 60 | 23 | 31 | 54 | 47 | 5 | 0 | 0 | 0 | 6 |
| 1970–71 | Estevan Bruins | WCHL | 65 | 36 | 38 | 74 | 75 | 7 | 5 | 3 | 8 | 2 |
| 1971–72 | New Westminster Bruins | WCHL | 68 | 37 | 39 | 76 | 107 | 5 | 3 | 0 | 3 | 4 |
| 1972–73 | Hershey Bears | AHL | 69 | 22 | 24 | 46 | 64 | 7 | 0 | 2 | 2 | 26 |
| 1973–74 | Hershey Bears | AHL | 17 | 4 | 5 | 9 | 12 | — | — | — | — | — |
| 1973–74 | Pittsburgh Penguins | NHL | 53 | 9 | 10 | 19 | 32 | — | — | — | — | — |
| 1974–75 | Hershey Bears | AHL | 27 | 9 | 14 | 23 | 53 | — | — | — | — | — |
| 1974–75 | St. Louis Blues | NHL | 26 | 4 | 5 | 9 | 2 | 2 | 0 | 0 | 0 | 0 |
| 1974–75 | Denver Spurs | CHL | 7 | 6 | 6 | 12 | 8 | — | — | — | — | — |
| 1975–76 | Providence Reds | AHL | 64 | 21 | 17 | 38 | 62 | — | — | — | — | — |
| 1975–76 | Calgary Cowboys | WHA | 15 | 5 | 2 | 7 | 18 | 10 | 3 | 4 | 7 | 8 |
| 1976–77 | Hershey Bears | AHL | 37 | 15 | 18 | 33 | 19 | 6 | 1 | 1 | 2 | 4 |
| 1976–77 | Tidewater Sharks | SHL | 29 | 13 | 15 | 28 | 4 | — | — | — | — | — |
| 1976–77 | Calgary Cowboys | WHA | 6 | 0 | 1 | 1 | 0 | — | — | — | — | — |
| 1977–78 | Cranbrook Royals | WIHL | 32 | 10 | 25 | 35 | 30 | — | — | — | — | — |
| 1980–81 | Cranbrook Royals | WIHL | 34 | 15 | 12 | 27 | 29 | — | — | — | — | — |
| 1981–82 | Cranbrook Royals | WIHL | 32 | 10 | 22 | 32 | 35 | — | — | — | — | — |
| WHA totals | | | 21 | 5 | 3 | 8 | 18 | 10 | 3 | 4 | 7 | 8 |
| NHL totals | | | 79 | 13 | 15 | 28 | 34 | 2 | 0 | 0 | 0 | 0 |
