= Danny Lawson =

Canadian ice hockey player

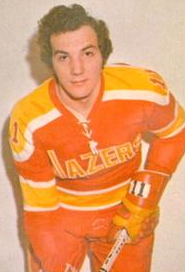
- Born: October 30, 1947 Toronto, Ontario, Canada
- Died: September 15, 2008 (aged 60) Calgary, Alberta, Canada
- Height: 5 ft 11 in (180 cm)
- Weight: 180 lb (82 kg; 12 st 12 lb)
- Position: Right wing
- Shot: Right
- Played for: Detroit Red Wings; Minnesota North Stars; Buffalo Sabres; Philadelphia Blazers; Vancouver Blazers; Calgary Cowboys; Winnipeg Jets
- Playing career: 1968–1977

Daniel Michael Lawson (October 30, 1947 — September 15, 2008) was a Canadian ice hockey right winger who played in the National Hockey League (NHL) from 1968 to 1972 and the World Hockey Association (WHA) from 1972 to 1977. He led the WHA in goal scoring in its inaugural season.

== Junior career ==
Lawson played junior for the Hamilton Red Wings of the Ontario Hockey Association, who were sponsored at the time by the Detroit Red Wings of the National Hockey League. Lawson was with the Hamilton team when they went to the Memorial Cup finals in 1967. Lawson's individual offensive totals gradually improved each year until in 1967-68, his last year, when he finished second in the league in goal-scoring with 52 and led his team in points. He was also named to the OHA's First All Star team.

== Pro career ==
Lawson played a single game with the Detroit Red Wings in the 1967–68 season, before becoming a full-time professional the next year, shuttling between the Wings and the minor-league Fort Worth Wings of the Central Hockey League. Before season's end he was traded to the Minnesota North Stars, serving the role of a defensive forward on the third and fourth lines. He spent the next two years with the North Stars, further splitting his time between the parent club and the minor leagues, before a trade in the 1971 offseason to the Buffalo Sabres. It was with Buffalo that Lawson finally received substantial ice time, albeit in a checking role shadowing other teams' offensive stars. It was to be his first complete season in the NHL without any time spent in the minors. He would finish the 76 games scoring 10 goals.

In 1972 the WHA came into existence and the upstart league was stealing from the NHL both their superstars and players to simply fill their rosters. Lawson made the jump and signed with the Philadelphia Blazers. Although having had a five-year career in the NHL under his belt, it was not until moving to the WHA that his scoring abilities were fully realized. In the WHA’s inaugural season, despite the presence of superstar Bobby Hull, it was Lawson who on February 22 became the first player to score 50 goals. Playing on a line with Don Herriman and Andre Lacroix, by season’s end he led the league in goals with 61. Lawson capped that season by being selected to the WHA All Star Team's First Team.

Lawson remained a star in the WHA, almost entirely with the Blazers' franchise through moves from Philadelphia to Vancouver and finally to Calgary. Midway through the 1977 season he was traded to the Winnipeg Jets and reached the Avco Cup final, where the Jets lost to the Quebec Nordiques, after which Lawson retired. In the NHL, Lawson appeared in 219 games, scoring 28 goals and 29 assists. However, in the WHA he played in 392 games, scoring 218 goals and adding 204 assists. Despite not participating in the final two seasons of the WHA's existence he still finished at #8 in all-time WHA goals.

== Post NHL ==
In August 1986, at age 39, Lawson attempted a comeback in the NHL, attending the Edmonton Oilers training camp, but was released by the club in September. Lawson then found employment in German hockey. For the 1986-87 season he played with the third division team EC Hedos Munich helping the team move up to the second division. The next season, he coached SV Bayreuth and the team finished fourth out of ten teams in the southern division.

On September 15, 2008, Lawson died of cancer.

== Honours ==
In 2010, he was elected as an inaugural inductee into the World Hockey Association Hall of Fame.

== Career statistics ==
=== Regular season and playoffs ===
| | | | Regular season | | | | | Playoffs |
| Season | Team | League | GP | G | A | Pts | PIM | GP | G | A | Pts | PIM |
|---|---|---|---|---|---|---|---|---|---|---|---|---|
| 1964–65 | Hamilton Red Wings | OHA | 3 | 0 | 0 | 0 | 2 | — | — | — | — | — |
| 1965–66 | Hamilton Red Wings | OHA | 30 | 7 | 9 | 16 | 4 | 5 | 1 | 1 | 2 | 2 |
| 1966–67 | Hamilton Red Wings | OHA | 48 | 25 | 24 | 49 | 27 | 17 | 15 | 11 | 26 | 11 |
| 1967–68 | Hamilton Red Wings | OHA | 54 | 52 | 38 | 90 | 26 | 11 | 8 | 7 | 15 | 11 |
| 1967–68 | Detroit Red Wings | NHL | 1 | 0 | 0 | 0 | 0 | — | — | — | — | — |
| 1968–69 | Detroit Red Wings | NHL | 44 | 5 | 7 | 12 | 21 | — | — | — | — | — |
| 1968–69 | Fort Worth Wings | CHL | 8 | 4 | 5 | 9 | 0 | — | — | — | — | — |
| 1968–69 | Minnesota North Stars | NHL | 18 | 3 | 3 | 6 | 4 | — | — | — | — | — |
| 1969–70 | Minnesota North Stars | NHL | 45 | 9 | 8 | 17 | 19 | 6 | 0 | 1 | 1 | 2 |
| 1969–70 | Iowa Stars | CHL | 31 | 12 | 21 | 33 | 8 | — | — | — | — | — |
| 1970–71 | Minnesota North Stars | NHL | 33 | 1 | 5 | 6 | 2 | 10 | 0 | 0 | 0 | 0 |
| 1970–71 | Cleveland Barons | AHL | 10 | 3 | 4 | 7 | 14 | — | — | — | — | — |
| 1971–72 | Buffalo Sabres | NHL | 78 | 10 | 6 | 16 | 15 | — | — | — | — | — |
| 1972–73 | Philadelphia Blazers | WHA | 78 | 61 | 45 | 106 | 35 | 4 | 0 | 1 | 1 | 0 |
| 1973–74 | Vancouver Blazers | WHA | 78 | 50 | 38 | 88 | 14 | — | — | — | — | — |
| 1974–75 | Vancouver Blazers | WHA | 78 | 33 | 43 | 76 | 19 | — | — | — | — | — |
| 1975–76 | Calgary Cowboys | WHA | 80 | 44 | 52 | 96 | 46 | 9 | 4 | 4 | 8 | 19 |
| 1976–77 | Calgary Cowboys | WHA | 64 | 24 | 19 | 43 | 26 | — | — | — | — | — |
| 1976–77 | Winnipeg Jets | WHA | 14 | 6 | 7 | 13 | 2 | 13 | 2 | 4 | 6 | 6 |
| WHA totals | | | 392 | 218 | 204 | 422 | 142 | 26 | 6 | 9 | 15 | 25 |
| NHL totals | | | 219 | 28 | 29 | 57 | 61 | 16 | 0 | 1 | 1 | 2 |
