= Calgary Cowboys =

Former ice hockey team of the World Hockey Association

- City: Calgary, Alberta
- League: WHA
- Founded: 1972
- Operated: 1975–1977
- Home arena: Stampede Corral
- Colors: Red, white
- Media: CFAC-TV; CFAC

Franchise history
- 1972: Miami Screaming Eagles
- 1972–1973: Philadelphia Blazers
- 1973–1975: Vancouver Blazers
- 1975–1977: Calgary Cowboys

The Calgary Cowboys were an ice hockey team that played two seasons in the World Hockey Association (WHA) from 1975 to 1977. The Cowboys played at the Stampede Corral in Calgary. The franchise was founded in 1972 as the Miami Screaming Eagles, though it never played a game in Miami. The team was based in Philadelphia and Vancouver, known in both markets as the Blazers, before relocating to Calgary. The franchise folded in 1977.

== History ==
=== Miami, Philadelphia and Vancouver ===
Originally in 1972, the franchise was to be based out of Miami, Florida, called the Miami Screaming Eagles. But due to money problems and a lack of a suitable arena, they never played a game in Miami. Instead, they moved to Philadelphia and debuted as the Philadelphia Blazers the same year. After only one season in Philadelphia, the team relocated to Vancouver, British Columbia, and became the Vancouver Blazers in 1973–74, then two years later relocated to Calgary to become the Cowboys in 1975–76.

=== Calgary ===
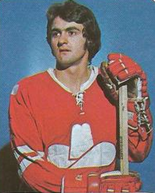
1975-76 card of Ron Chipperfield in Calgary

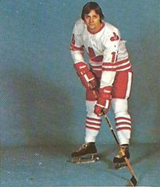
1975-76 card of Rick Jodzio, impetus for one of the most famous brawls in WHA history

In 1972, the fledgling WHA attempted to place a team in Calgary, to be known as the Broncos in the hopes of a rivalry with Edmonton, and the Oilers. When the team's owner, Bob Brownridge, suddenly died before the WHA's inaugural season, the team abruptly moved to Cleveland to become the Crusaders (having never played a single game as the Calgary Broncos). This prompted the Oilers to rename themselves the Alberta Oilers, with the intention of splitting their home schedule between the two cities. This plan similarly failed to materialize, and the Oilers dropped the Alberta moniker after one season, calling Edmonton their exclusive home. Calgary would get its second chance in the WHA in 1975, when the Vancouver Blazers moved across the Rocky Mountains. Owner Jim Pattison, failing in his goal of taking the Vancouver market away from the NHL's Vancouver Canucks chose to relocate to Calgary. However, by the time the WHA did arrive, the league was already in difficulty, and the team was viewed as minor-league, despite the presence of aging superstars such as Gordie Howe and Bobby Hull in the league.

The franchise played out of the 6,500 Stampede Corral, knowing that its small size would prevent the team from achieving profitability initially. They were hoping for strong attendance figures that would encourage the Calgary Exhibition and Stampede board, who owned and operated the Corral, to expand the facility to 15,000 seats. Such an expansion had been planned by the Stampede board, but with no timelines, and no commitment to finance it.

In their first season, the Cowboys were not expected to ice a strong team, having inherited a franchise that finished in a last place tie with the Oilers the previous year. Calgary finished 41–35–4 however, as a 44-goal season by Danny Lawson and 42 goals from Ron Chipperfield helped the Cowboys finish a surprising third in the Canadian division.

In the 1976 playoffs, the Cowboys met the Quebec Nordiques in the first round. The series is best known for one of hockey's most legendary brawls. The incident began when Calgary's Rick Jodzio cross-checked Quebec's Marc Tardif in the head, causing both teams to leave their benches. The brawl lasted 20 minutes, and ended only when Quebec police gathered at the players benches and escorted the teams back to their dressing rooms. Following a 20-minute break to allow both teams to cool down, the game resumed – minus eleven ejected players. The incident caught the attention of Quebec's Solicitor General Fernand Lalonde, who had the incident investigated as a criminal matter. Jodzio was suspended indefinitely by the league, and later pleaded guilty in a Quebec court to a charge of assault over the incident. Cowboys coach Joe Crozier was suspended for the rest of the series.

Calgary went on to defeat the Nordiques, who had finished 18-points ahead of Calgary in the regular season, but were defeated by the Winnipeg Jets in the second round. The team never really captured the attention of Calgarians, as fewer than 5,000 fans, on average, attended playoff games against the Jets.

During the 1976–77 season, attendance fell to below 4,500 per game. Rumours abounded that the franchise would move again, to Ottawa, though it completed the season in Calgary. Team owner, Jim Pattison, attempted to keep the Cowboys afloat in 1977–78, with the ultimate hope of being a part of the expected amalgamation with the National Hockey League. During preliminary discussions between the two leagues, it was proposed that six WHA teams merge into the NHL. However, the Corral's capacity was barely half of the NHL's then-minimum capacity of 12,500 seats. When the NHL made it clear it had no interest in a team playing out of the Corral even as a temporary facility, it was expected that Pattison would request a two-year leave of absence in the hopes of building a new arena. The NHL voted down the 1977 merger plan, while only 2,000 fans purchased season tickets for the 1977–78 season. With no imminent hope for a new arena, Pattison chose to fold the franchise on August 18, 1977.

Calgary had to wait only three years for the NHL to arrive, however. The Atlanta Flames relocated to the city in 1980–81 as the Calgary Flames. The move came after the WHA had finally merged with the NHL, with its three remaining Canadian teams all surviving to join the NHL. More importantly, by 1980 a strong and ultimately successful bid to host the 1988 Winter Olympics had been submitted to the International Olympic Committee, and as part of this bid serious plans were in the works for a new NHL-sized arena. With the promise of a new home, the NHL allowed the move. The Flames played in the Corral as a temporary home until moving into the Saddledome in 1983.

The last active player from the Cowboys was Warren Miller who retired during the 1982-83 NHL season. The last active former Cowboy was George Pesut who played in Germany until 1994.

== Season-by-season record ==
See 1975–76 Calgary Cowboys season
See 1976–77 Calgary Cowboys season

Note: GP = Games played, W = Wins, L = Losses, T = Ties, Pts = Points, GF = Goals for, GA = Goals against, PIM = Penalties in minutes

Season	Team Name	GP	W	L	T	PTS	GF	GA	PIM	Finish	Playoffs
1975–76	Calgary Cowboys	80	41	35	4	86	307	282	1064	3rd, Canadian	Won Quarterfinals (Nordiques); Lost Semifinals (Jets)
1976–77	Calgary Cowboys	81	31	43	7	69	252	296	832	5th, Western	Did not qualify

== Team members ==
=== Honoured members ===
One Hockey Hall of Famer played for the Cowboys. Harry Howell finished his 24-year professional career in 1975–76 with Calgary, playing 31 games and recording three assists. At the time of his retirement, Howell had played more major-league hockey games than any other defenceman in history at 1,581.

== See also ==
- Ice hockey in Calgary
- List of Calgary Cowboys (WHA) players
- List of ice hockey teams in Alberta
