= 1976–77 Winnipeg Jets season =

NHA hockey team season

1976–77 Winnipeg Jets
- Division: 2nd West
- 1976–77 record: 46–32–2
- Home record: 30–9–1
- Road record: 16–23–1
- Goals for: 366
- Goals against: 291

Team information
- General manager: Rudy Pilous
- Coach: Bobby Kromm
- Captain: Lars-Erik Sjoberg
- Alternate captains: Ted Green; Anders Hedberg
- Arena: Winnipeg Arena

Team leaders
- Goals: Anders Hedberg (70)
- Assists: Ulf Nilsson (85)
- Points: Anders Hedberg (131)
- Penalty minutes: Dave Dunn (129)
- Wins: Joe Daley (39)
- Goals against average: Joe Daley (3.24)

The 1976–77 Winnipeg Jets season was the Jets' fifth season of operation in the World Hockey Association (WHA). The Jets, the defending WHA champions, made it to the Avco Cup final before losing to the Quebec Nordiques.

== Regular season ==
=== Final standings ===
Western Division
	GP	W	L	T	GF	GA	PTS
Houston Aeros	80	50	24	6	320	241	106
Winnipeg Jets	80	46	32	2	366	291	94
San Diego Mariners	81	40	37	4	284	283	85
Edmonton Oilers	81	34	43	4	243	304	72
Calgary Cowboys	81	31	43	7	252	296	69
Phoenix Roadrunners	80	28	48	4	281	383	60

== Schedule and results ==
1976–77 regular season
October: 7–3–0, 14 points (home: 6–1–0; road: 1–2–0)

Game	Result	Date	Score	Opponent	Record
1	W	October 8, 1976	4–1	Calgary Cowboys (1976–77)	1–0–0
2	W	October 10, 1976	5–2	New England Whalers (1976–77)	2–0–0
3	W	October 15, 1976	6–1	@ Edmonton Oilers (1976–77)	3–0–0
4	L	October 16, 1976	4–6	@ Phoenix Roadrunners (1976–77)	3–1–0
5	L	October 17, 1976	1–3	@ San Diego Mariners (1976–77)	3–2–0
6	W	October 19, 1976	6–1	Indianapolis Racers (1976–77)	4–2–0
7	L	October 22, 1976	3–4 OT	Phoenix Roadrunners (1976–77)	4–3–0
8	W	October 24, 1976	7–1	Birmingham Bulls (1976–77)	5–3–0
9	W	October 29, 1976	11–3	Edmonton Oilers (1976–77)	6–3–0
10	W	October 31, 1976	6–4	San Diego Mariners (1976–77)	7–3–0

November: 7–7–1, 15 points (home: 5–3–0; road: 2–4–1)

Game	Result	Date	Score	Opponent	Record
11	L	November 2, 1976	1–3	Houston Aeros (1976–77)	7–4–0
12	W	November 5, 1976	9–2	Minnesota Fighting Saints (1976–77)	8–4–0
13	L	November 6, 1976	3–7	@ Cincinnati Stingers (1976–77)	8–5–0
14	W	November 7, 1976	5–2	Edmonton Oilers (1976–77)	9–5–0
15	W	November 9, 1976	5–4 OT	New England Whalers (1976–77)	10–5–0
16	L	November 11, 1976	5–7	@ Calgary Cowboys (1976–77)	10–6–0
17	W	November 14, 1976	2–0	@ Calgary Cowboys (1976–77)	11–6–0
18	W	November 16, 1976	8–4	Quebec Nordiques (1976–77)	12–6–0
19	W	November 19, 1976	7–3	@ New England Whalers (1976–77)	13–6–0
20	L	November 20, 1976	4–8	@ Indianapolis Racers (1976–77)	13–7–0
21	L	November 21, 1976	2–4	Cincinnati Stingers (1976–77)	13–8–0
22	L	November 23, 1976	4–7	@ Quebec Nordiques (1976–77)	13–9–0
23	T	November 26, 1976	1–1	@ Houston Aeros (1976–77)	13–9–1
24	L	November 28, 1976	3–5	Phoenix Roadrunners (1976–77)	13–10–1
25	W	November 30, 1976	8–2	San Diego Mariners (1976–77)	14–10–1

December: 4–5–0, 8 points (home: 1–2–0; road: 3–3–0)

Game	Result	Date	Score	Opponent	Record
26	W	December 3, 1976	4–3	@ Minnesota Fighting Saints (1976–77)	15–10–1
27	W	December 4, 1976	6–2	@ New England Whalers (1976–77)	16–10–1
28	L	December 5, 1976	4–6	@ Quebec Nordiques (1976–77)	16–11–1
29	W	December 7, 1976	4–2	Phoenix Roadrunners (1976–77)	17–11–1
30	W	December 8, 1976	4–2	@ Calgary Cowboys (1976–77)	18–11–1
31	L	December 10, 1976	3–5	Birmingham Bulls (1976–77)	18–12–1
32	L	December 26, 1976	3–12	Quebec Nordiques (1976–77)	18–13–1
33	L	December 28, 1976	3–6	@ Houston Aeros (1976–77)	18–14–1
34	L	December 30, 1976	3–4	@ San Diego Mariners (1976–77)	18–15–1

January: 7–5–0, 14 points (home: 6–1–0; road: 1–4–0)

Game	Result	Date	Score	Opponent	Record
35	W	January 2, 1977	5–2	Houston Aeros (1976–77)	19–15–1
36	W	January 4, 1977	2–1	Indianapolis Racers (1976–77)	20–15–1
37	W	January 9, 1977	4–1	Birmingham Bulls (1976–77)	21–15–1
38	W	January 11, 1977	9–2	Phoenix Roadrunners (1976–77)	22–15–1
39	W	January 14, 1977	5–3	@ Calgary Cowboys (1976–77)	23–15–1
40	L	January 16, 1977	4–6	Cincinnati Stingers (1976–77)	23–16–1
41	W	January 21, 1977	6–5 OT	Cincinnati Stingers (1976–77)	24–16–1
42	W	January 23, 1977	10–5	Calgary Cowboys (1976–77)	25–16–1
43	L	January 25, 1977	2–5	@ Houston Aeros (1976–77)	25–17–1
44	L	January 27, 1977	0–3	@ Birmingham Bulls (1976–77)	25–18–1
45	L	January 29, 1977	3–5	@ San Diego Mariners (1976–77)	25–19–1
46	L	January 30, 1977	5–8	@ Phoenix Roadrunners (1976–77)	25–20–1

February: 9–5–1, 19 points (home: 5–1–1; road: 4–4–0)

Game	Result	Date	Score	Opponent	Record
47	W	February 1, 1977	11–1	@ Edmonton Oilers (1976–77)	26–20–1
48	W	February 4, 1977	8–2	San Diego Mariners (1976–77)	27–20–1
49	W	February 6, 1977	6–4	Calgary Cowboys (1976–77)	28–20–1
50	W	February 8, 1977	7–2	@ Quebec Nordiques (1976–77)	29–20–1
51	L	February 10, 1977	3–6	@ New England Whalers (1976–77)	29–21–1
52	L	February 11, 1977	0–4	@ Cincinnati Stingers (1976–77)	29–22–1
53	W	February 13, 1977	7–5	@ Indianapolis Racers (1976–77)	30–22–1
54	T	February 15, 1977	2–2	Calgary Cowboys (1976–77)	30–22–2
55	W	February 17, 1977	4–2	Indianapolis Racers (1976–77)	31–22–2
56	L	February 18, 1977	2–3	@ Edmonton Oilers (1976–77)	31–23–2
57	W	February 20, 1977	4–2	Edmonton Oilers (1976–77)	32–23–2
58	W	February 22, 1977	3–2	Houston Aeros (1976–77)	33–23–2
59	L	February 23, 1977	3–6	@ Phoenix Roadrunners (1976–77)	33–24–2
60	W	February 26, 1977	8–6	@ Cincinnati Stingers (1976–77)	34–24–2
61	L	February 27, 1977	2–3	New England Whalers (1976–77)	34–25–2

March: 9–6–0, 18 points (home: 6–1–0; road: 3–5–0)

Game	Result	Date	Score	Opponent	Record
62	L	March 1, 1977	1–6	@ Calgary Cowboys (1976–77)	34–26–2
63	W	March 2, 1977	4–3 OT	Quebec Nordiques (1976–77)	35–26–2
64	L	March 3, 1977	4–5	@ Edmonton Oilers (1976–77)	35–27–2
65	L	March 5, 1977	1–4	@ Phoenix Roadrunners (1976–77)	35–28–2
66	W	March 8, 1977	5–0	San Diego Mariners (1976–77)	36–28–2
67	W	March 11, 1977	4–1	Calgary Cowboys (1976–77)	37–28–2
68	W	March 13, 1977	9–3	Edmonton Oilers (1976–77)	38–28–2
69	W	March 15, 1977	7–0	Edmonton Oilers (1976–77)	39–28–2
70	L	March 17, 1977	3–4	@ Edmonton Oilers (1976–77)	39–29–2
71	W	March 18, 1977	7–5	@ Indianapolis Racers (1976–77)	40–29–2
72	W	March 20, 1977	4–3 OT	@ Birmingham Bulls (1976–77)	41–29–2
73	W	March 22, 1977	8–3	Edmonton Oilers (1976–77)	42–29–2
74	W	March 27, 1977	5–3	@ Houston Aeros (1976–77)	43–29–2
75	L	March 29, 1977	2–5	Houston Aeros (1976–77)	43–30–2
76	L	March 31, 1977	3–4	@ San Diego Mariners (1976–77)	43–31–2

April: 3–1–0, 6 points (home: 1–0–0; road: 2–1–0)

Game	Result	Date	Score	Opponent	Record
77	W	April 2, 1977	6–5	@ Birmingham Bulls (1976–77)	44–31–2
78	W	April 3, 1977	6–4	Calgary Cowboys (1976–77)	45–31–2
79	L	April 4, 1977	2–6	@ Edmonton Oilers (1976–77)	45–32–2
80	W	April 7, 1977	6–4	@ Calgary Cowboys (1976–77)	46–32–2

Legend: Win (2 points) Loss (0 points) Tie (1 point)

== Playoffs ==
The Jets lost in the Avco Cup Finals.

1977 Avco Cup playoffs
Quarterfinals vs. (W2) San Diego Mariners – Jets win 4–3

Game	Date	Visitor	Score	Home	Series
1	April 10	San Diego Mariners	1–5	Winnipeg Jets	1–0
2	April 12	San Diego Mariners	1–4	Winnipeg Jets	2–0
3	April 16	Winnipeg Jets	4–5	San Diego Mariners	2–1
4	April 17	Winnipeg Jets	4–6	San Diego Mariners	2–2
5	April 20	San Diego Mariners	0–3	Winnipeg Jets	3–2
6	April 22	Winnipeg Jets	1–3	San Diego Mariners	3–3
7	April 24	San Diego Mariners	3–7	Winnipeg Jets	4–3

Semifinals vs. (W1) Houston Aeros – Jets win 4–2

Game	Date	Visitor	Score	Home	Series
1	April 26	Winnipeg Jets	4–3 OT	Houston Aeros	1–0
2	April 28	Winnipeg Jets	2–7	Houston Aeros	1–1
3	April 30	Houston Aeros	3–4	Winnipeg Jets	2–1
4	May 1	Houston Aeros	4–6	Winnipeg Jets	3–1
5	May 3	Winnipeg Jets	2–3	Houston Aeros	3–2
6	May 5	Houston Aeros	3–6	Winnipeg Jets	4–2

Avco Cup Finals vs. (E1) Quebec Nordiques – Nordiques win 4–3

Game	Date	Visitor	Score	Home	Series
1	May 11	Winnipeg Jets	2–1	Quebec Nordiques	1–0
2	May 15	Winnipeg Jets	1–6	Quebec Nordiques	1–1
3	May 18	Quebec Nordiques	1–6	Winnipeg Jets	2–1
4	May 20	Quebec Nordiques	4–2	Winnipeg Jets	2–2
5	May 22	Winnipeg Jets	3–8	Quebec Nordiques	2–3
6	May 24	Quebec Nordiques	3–12	Winnipeg Jets	3–3
7	May 26	Winnipeg Jets	2–8	Quebec Nordiques	3–4

Legend: Win Loss

== Player statistics ==
=== Regular season ===
Scoring

Regular season
Player	Pos	GP	G	A	Pts	PIM	+/-	PPG	SHG	GWG
Anders Hedberg	RW	68	70	61	131	48	48	22	0	10
Ulf Nilsson	C	71	39	85	124	89	57	8	3	6
Peter Sullivan	C	78	31	52	83	18	11	6	0	3
Willy Lindstrom	RW	79	44	36	80	37	−2	11	0	6
Veli-Pekka Ketola	C	64	25	29	54	59	−13	6	0	
Bobby Hull	LW	34	21	32	53	14	16	7	0	
Dan Labraaten	LW	64	24	27	51	21	−11	8	0	
Barry Long	D	71	9	38	47	54	−1	4	0	
Perry Miller	D	74	14	31	45	124	27	5	1	
Bill Lesuk	LW	78	14	27	41	85	23	2	0	
Lars-Erik Sjoberg	D	52	2	38	40	31	9	1	1	
Mats Lindh	C	73	14	17	31	2	−13	1	2	
Bobby Guindon	LW	69	10	17	27	19	−12	3	0	
Thommie Bergman	D	42	2	24	26	37	3	0	0	
Ted Green	D	70	4	21	25	45	12	2	0	
Lyle Moffat	LW	74	13	11	24	90	−7	2	0	
Kent Ruhnke	RW	51	11	11	22	2	−12	0	0	
Mike Ford	D	22	3	14	17	20	14	0	0	
Heikki Riihiranta	D	53	1	16	17	28	−1	0	0	
Dave Dunn	D	40	3	11	14	129	−1	0	0	
Danny Lawson	RW	14	6	7	13	2	0	2	0	
Ron Ward	C	14	4	7	11	2	−2	2	0	
Fran Huck	C	12	2	2	4	10	−1	0	0	
Joe Daley	G	65	0	4	4	6	0	0	0	0
Jim Cole	LW	2	0	1	1	0	−1	0	0	0
Curt Larsson	G	19	0	1	1	4	0	0	0	0
Morris Mott	RW	2	0	1	1	5	1	0	0	0

Goaltending

Player	MIN	GP	W	L	T	GA	GAA	SO
Joe Daley	3818	65	39	23	2	206	3.24	3
Curt Larsson	1019	19	7	9	0	82	4.83	0
Team:	4837	80	46	32	2	288	3.57	3

=== Playoffs ===
Scoring

Player	Pos	GP	G	A	Pts	PIM	GWG
Anders Hedberg	RW	20	13	16	29	13	2
Ulf Nilsson	C	20	6	21	27	33	0
Dan Labraaten	LW	20	7	17	24	15	1
Bobby Hull	LW	20	13	9	22	2	2
Peter Sullivan	C	20	7	12	19	2	2
Mike Ford	D	20	3	13	16	12	0
Willy Lindstrom	RW	20	9	6	15	22	1
Perry Miller	D	20	4	6	10	27	0
Mats Lindh	C	20	2	7	9	2	1
Dave Dunn	D	20	4	4	8	23	1
Bobby Guindon	LW	20	4	4	8	9	1
Danny Lawson	RW	13	2	4	6	6	0
Barry Long	D	20	1	5	6	10	0
Lars-Erik Sjoberg	D	20	0	6	6	22	0
Ted Green	D	20	1	3	4	12	0
Bill Lesuk	LW	18	2	1	3	22	0
Lyle Moffat	LW	17	2	0	2	6	0
Fran Huck	C	7	0	2	2	6	0
Joe Daley	G	20	0	1	1	0	0
Curt Larsson	G	1	0	0	0	0	0

Goaltending

Player	MIN	GP	W	L	GA	GAA	SO
Joe Daley	1186	20	11	9	71	3.59	1
Curt Larsson	20	1	0	0	1	3.00	0
Team:	1206	20	11	9	72	3.58	1

Note:

Pos = Position;GP = Games played; G = Goals; A = Assists; Pts = Points; PIM = Penalty minutes; +/- = Plus/minus; PPG = Power-play goals; SHG = Short-handed goals; GWG = Game-winning goals
Pos = Position;GP = Games played; Min, TOI = Minutes played; W = Wins; L = Losses; T,T/OT = Ties; OTL = Overtime losses; GA = Goals-against; GAA = Goals-against average; SO = Shutouts; SA = Shots against; SV = Shots saved;SV% = Save percentage;

== Draft picks ==
Winnipeg's draft picks at the 1976 WHA Amateur Draft.

Round	#	Player	Nationality	College/Junior/Club team (League)
1	9	Thomas Gradin (F)	Sweden	MoDo AIK (Elitserien)
2	17	Clayton Pachal (C)	Canada	New Westminster Bruins (WCHL)
2	20	Tom Rowe (RW)	United States	London Knights (OHA)
3	33	Steve Clippingdale (LW)	Canada	New Westminster Bruins (WCHL)
4	45	Goran Lindblom (D)	Sweden	Skelleftea AIK (Elitserien)
5	57	Doug Johnston (D)	Canada	Lethbridge Broncos (WCHL)
6	69	Fred Berry (C)	Canada	New Westminster Bruins (WCHL)
7	81	Greg Craig (C)	Canada	St. Catharines Black Hawks (OHA)
8	92	Brian Granfield (D)	Canada	Brandon Wheat Kings (WCHL)
9	103	Anders Hakansson (F)	Sweden	AIK IF (Elitserien)
10	115	Jorgen Pettersson (F)	Sweden	Vastra Frolunda (Elitserien)

== See also ==
- 1976–77 WHA season
