= 1976–77 Phoenix Roadrunners season =

Professional hockey season

1976–77 Phoenix Roadrunners
- Division: 6th Western
- 1976–77 record: 28–48–4
- Home record: 20–18–2
- Road record: 8–30–2
- Goals for: 281
- Goals against: 383

Team information
- Coach: Al Rollins
- Captain: Al McLeod
- Alternate captains: Jim Niekamp; Robbie Ftorek
- Arena: Arizona Veterans Memorial Coliseum

Team leaders
- Goals: Robbie Ftorek (46)
- Assists: Robbie Ftorek (71)
- Points: Robbie Ftorek (117)
- Penalty minutes: Jerry Rollins (169)
- Wins: Clay Hebenton (17)
- Goals against average: Clay Hebenton (4.22)

The 1976–77 Phoenix Roadrunners season was the third and final season of the Phoenix Roadrunners in the World Hockey Association (WHA). The Roadrunners finished sixth in the Western Division and did not qualify for the playoffs.

Their worst loss was an 11-3 defeat to the Québec Nordiques on October 26 when Réal Cloutier tied a WHA record with five goals in a single game.

The team announced their departure from the WHA in April shortly before the end of their season. They won their last WHA home game on April 6, 1977.

== Regular season ==
=== Final standings ===
Western Division
	GP	W	L	T	GF	GA	PTS
Houston Aeros	80	50	24	6	320	241	106
Winnipeg Jets	80	46	32	2	366	291	94
San Diego Mariners	81	40	37	4	284	283	85
Edmonton Oilers	81	34	43	4	243	304	72
Calgary Cowboys	81	31	43	7	252	296	69
Phoenix Roadrunners	80	28	48	4	281	383	60

== Schedule and results ==
1976–77 regular season
October

Game	Result	Date	Score	Opponent	Record
1	W	October 8, 1976	8–6	Cincinnati Stingers (1976–77)	1–0–0
2	L	October 9, 1976	3–5	@ Houston Aeros (1976–77)	1–1–0
3	W	October 14, 1976	4–3	Minnesota Fighting Saints (1976–77)	2–1–0
4	W	October 16, 1976	6–4	Winnipeg Jets (1976–77)	3–1–0
5	L	October 19, 1976	4–5 OT	@ Edmonton Oilers (1976–77)	3–2–0
6	W	October 22, 1976	4–3 OT	@ Winnipeg Jets (1976–77)	4–2–0
7	W	October 24, 1976	5–3	@ Edmonton Oilers (1976–77)	5–2–0
8	L	October 26, 1976	3–11	@ Quebec Nordiques (1976–77)	5–3–0
9	L	October 29, 1976	1–5	@ New England Whalers (1976–77)	5–4–0
10	L	October 30, 1976	3–9	@ Cincinnati Stingers (1976–77)	5–5–0

November

Game	Result	Date	Score	Opponent	Record
11	W	November 2, 1976	5–3	@ Quebec Nordiques (1976–77)	6–5–0
12	L	November 4, 1976	3–5	@ Birmingham Bulls (1976–77)	6–6–0
13	L	November 5, 1976	1–9	@ Houston Aeros (1976–77)	6–7–0
14	W	November 7, 1976	3–1	@ Minnesota Fighting Saints (1976–77)	7–7–0
15	T	November 10, 1976	3–3	Indianapolis Racers (1976–77)	7–7–1
16	W	November 12, 1976	3–1	New England Whalers (1976–77)	8–7–1
17	W	November 14, 1976	6–3	San Diego Mariners (1976–77)	9–7–1
18	W	November 16, 1976	5–2	Edmonton Oilers (1976–77)	10–7–1
19	L	November 18, 1976	1–2 OT	Calgary Cowboys (1976–77)	10–8–1
20	L	November 20, 1976	2–5	Houston Aeros (1976–77)	10–9–1
21	T	November 24, 1976	3–3	Calgary Cowboys (1976–77)	10–9–2
22	W	November 26, 1976	4–2	Edmonton Oilers (1976–77)	11–9–2
23	W	November 28, 1976	5–3	@ Winnipeg Jets (1976–77)	12–9–2
24	L	November 30, 1976	2–3 OT	@ Edmonton Oilers (1976–77)	12–10–2

December

Game	Result	Date	Score	Opponent	Record
25	L	December 2, 1976	3–4	@ San Diego Mariners (1976–77)	12–11–2
26	L	December 4, 1976	3–4	San Diego Mariners (1976–77)	12–12–2
27	L	December 5, 1976	0–6	@ Calgary Cowboys (1976–77)	12–13–2
28	L	December 7, 1976	2–4	@ Winnipeg Jets (1976–77)	12–14–2
29	L	December 9, 1976	4–5	Quebec Nordiques (1976–77)	12–15–2
30	L	December 12, 1976	0–8	@ Cincinnati Stingers (1976–77)	12–16–2
31	L	December 14, 1976	3–8	@ Houston Aeros (1976–77)	12–17–2
32	W	December 15, 1976	6–5	Birmingham Bulls (1976–77)	13–17–2
33	L	December 17, 1976	0–1	Edmonton Oilers (1976–77)	13–18–2
34	L	December 19, 1976	4–6	Houston Aeros (1976–77)	13–19–2
35	L	December 22, 1976	4–5 OT	San Diego Mariners (1976–77)	13–20–2
36	W	December 28, 1976	4–3	Indianapolis Racers (1976–77)	14–20–2

January

Game	Result	Date	Score	Opponent	Record
37	L	January 2, 1977	1–4	@ Indianapolis Racers (1976–77)	14–21–2
38	L	January 4, 1977	5–8	@ Birmingham Bulls (1976–77)	14–22–2
39	W	January 8, 1977	4–3	@ New England Whalers (1976–77)	15–22–2
40	L	January 11, 1977	2–9	@ Winnipeg Jets (1976–77)	15–23–2
41	W	January 12, 1977	4–2	Houston Aeros (1976–77)	16–23–2
42	W	January 14, 1977	6–5 OT	Cincinnati Stingers (1976–77)	17–23–2
43	L	January 16, 1977	4–5	Calgary Cowboys (1976–77)	17–24–2
44	W	January 20, 1977	9–4	Cincinnati Stingers (1976–77)	18–24–2
45	W	January 22, 1977	4–1	Edmonton Oilers (1976–77)	19–24–2
46	L	January 23, 1977	2–9	@ Edmonton Oilers (1976–77)	19–25–2
47	L	January 25, 1977	3–7	@ Calgary Cowboys (1976–77)	19–26–2
48	L	January 28, 1977	2–6	New England Whalers (1976–77)	19–27–2
49	W	January 30, 1977	8–5	Winnipeg Jets (1976–77)	20–27–2

February

Game	Result	Date	Score	Opponent	Record
50	L	February 1, 1977	1–5	@ San Diego Mariners (1976–77)	20–28–2
51	W	February 3, 1977	5–3	Houston Aeros (1976–77)	21–28–2
52	L	February 5, 1977	1–4	Calgary Cowboys (1976–77)	21–29–2
53	W	February 9, 1977	4–3 OT	Birmingham Bulls (1976–77)	22–29–2
54	L	February 11, 1977	3–5	San Diego Mariners (1976–77)	22–30–2
55	L	February 13, 1977	2–5	@ San Diego Mariners (1976–77)	22–31–2
56	L	February 16, 1977	2–7	@ Birmingham Bulls (1976–77)	22–32–2
57	L	February 17, 1977	2–4	@ New England Whalers (1976–77)	22–33–2
58	W	February 19, 1977	6–5	@ Indianapolis Racers (1976–77)	23–33–2
59	L	February 20, 1977	3–4	@ Cincinnati Stingers (1976–77)	23–34–2
60	W	February 23, 1977	6–3	Winnipeg Jets (1976–77)	24–34–2
61	T	February 24, 1977	3–3	@ San Diego Mariners (1976–77)	24–34–3
62	L	February 25, 1977	3–9	Houston Aeros (1976–77)	24–35–3
63	L	February 27, 1977	4–5	Houston Aeros (1976–77)	24–36–3

March

Game	Result	Date	Score	Opponent	Record
64	L	March 1, 1977	3–8	@ Houston Aeros (1976–77)	24–37–3
65	W	March 5, 1977	4–1	Winnipeg Jets (1976–77)	25–37–3
66	L	March 6, 1977	2–3 OT	@ Indianapolis Racers (1976–77)	25–38–3
67	L	March 8, 1977	2–9	@ Quebec Nordiques (1976–77)	25–39–3
68	W	March 12, 1977	7–6 OT	@ San Diego Mariners (1976–77)	26–39–3
69	T	March 15, 1977	4–4	@ San Diego Mariners (1976–77)	26–39–4
70	L	March 17, 1977	3–4	Quebec Nordiques (1976–77)	26–40–4
71	L	March 18, 1977	3–6	@ Houston Aeros (1976–77)	26–41–4
72	W	March 19, 1977	7–5	San Diego Mariners (1976–77)	27–41–4
73	L	March 20, 1977	1–6	@ San Diego Mariners (1976–77)	27–42–4
74	L	March 23, 1977	0–4	Birmingham Bulls (1976–77)	27–43–4
75	L	March 25, 1977	3–7	San Diego Mariners (1976–77)	27–44–4
76	L	March 27, 1977	4–5	@ Calgary Cowboys (1976–77)	27–45–4
77	L	March 29, 1977	5–9	@ Calgary Cowboys (1976–77)	27–46–4
78	L	March 31, 1977	2–6	New England Whalers (1976–77)	27–47–4

April

Game	Result	Date	Score	Opponent	Record
79	L	April 2, 1977	5–6 OT	Quebec Nordiques (1976–77)	27–48–4
80	W	April 6, 1977	7–3	Indianapolis Racers (1976–77)	28–48–4

Legend: Win (2 points) Loss (0 points) Tie (1 point)

== Player statistics ==
=== Players ===
Player	Position	GP	G	A	Pts	PIM	+/-	PPG	SHG	GWG
Robbie Ftorek	C/LW	80	46	71	117	86	26	11	0	5
Del Hall	C	80	38	41	79	30	6	9	1	0
Seppo Repo	C	80	29	31	60	10	−35	5	0	0
Ron Huston	C	80	20	39	59	10	−57	6	4	0
Frank Hughes	LW	48	24	29	53	20	5	3	0	0
Lauri Mononen	RW	67	21	29	50	10	−20	2	0	0
Bob Liddington	LW	80	20	24	44	28	−22	0	0	0
Juhani Tamminen	RW	65	10	29	39	22	−23	2	0	0
Mike Hobin	C	68	17	18	35	14	−43	2	0	0
Pekka Rautakallio	D	78	4	31	35	8	−24	2	0	0
Garry Lariviere	D	61	7	23	30	48	−19	3	0	0
Serge Beaudoin	D	77	6	24	30	136	−11	0	0	0
Michel Cormier	LW	58	13	16	29	22	−26	0	0	0
John Gray	RW	28	10	10	20	59	−1	0	0	0
Jim Niekamp	D	79	1	15	16	91	−32	0	0	0
Jerry Rollins	D	63	4	10	14	169	−25	1	0	0
Andre Hinse	LW	16	2	7	9	4	−7	0	0	0
Duane Bray	D	46	2	6	8	62	−41	0	0	0
Al McLeod	D	29	1	5	6	35	−10	0	0	0
Jan Popiel	LW	28	3	2	5	8	−24	1	0	0
Mike Sleep	RW	13	2	2	4	6	−3	0	0	0
Howie Young	D/RW	26	1	3	4	23	−8	0	0	0
Gary Kurt	G	33	0	3	3	6	0	0	0	0
Blair Davidson	D	2	0	0	0	2	−1	0	0	0
Dave Gorman	RW	5	0	0	0	0	−2	0	0	0
Clay Hebenton	G	56	0	0	0	2	0	0	0	0

=== Goaltending ===
Regular season
Player	MIN	GP	W	L	T	GA	GAA	SO
Clay Hebenton	3129	56	17	29	3	220	4.22	0
Gary Kurt	1752	33	11	19	1	162	5.55	0
Team:	4881	80	28	48	4	382	4.70	0

Note: Pos = Position; GP = Games played; G = Goals; A = Assists; Pts = Points; +/- = plus/minus; PIM = Penalty minutes; PPG = Power-play goals; SHG = Short-handed goals; GWG = Game-winning goals
MIN = Minutes played; W = Wins; L = Losses; T = Ties; GA = Goals-against; GAA = Goals-against average; SO = Shutouts;

== Draft picks ==
Phoenix's draft picks at the 1976 WHA Amateur Draft.

Round	#	Player	Nationality	College/Junior/Club team (League)
4	42	Kari Makkonen (F)	Finland	Assat Pori (Liiga)
5	54	Juhani Wallenius (F)	Finland	Lukko Rauma (Liiga)
6	66	Doug Patey (F)	Canada	Sault Ste. Marie Greyhounds (OHA)
7	78	Mark Davidson (LW)	Canada	Flin Flon Bombers (WCHL)
8	90	Jari Laiho (F)	Finland	Lukko Rauma (Liiga)
9	101	Jouni Rinne (F)	Finland	Lukko Rauma (Liiga)
10	112	Hannu Helander (D)	Finland	Ilves (Liiga)

== See also ==
- 1976–77 WHA season
