= 1976–77 Indianapolis Racers season =

World Hockey Association team season

1976–77 Indianapolis Racers
- Division: 3rd Eastern
- 1976–77 record: 36–37–8
- Home record: 24–13–3
- Road record: 12–24–5
- Goals for: 276
- Goals against: 305

Team information
- Coach: Jacques Demers
- Arena: Market Square Arena

Team leaders
- Goals: Blair MacDonald (34)
- Assists: Darryl Maggs (55)
- Points: Darryl Maggs (71)
- Penalty minutes: Kim Clackson (168)
- Wins: Michel Dion (17)
- Goals against average: Michel Dion (3.36)

The 1976–77 Indianapolis Racers season was the Racers' third season of operation in the World Hockey Association.

== Regular season ==
=== Final standings ===
Eastern Division
	GP	W	L	T	GF	GA	PTS
Quebec Nordiques	81	47	31	3	353	295	97
Cincinnati Stingers	81	39	37	5	354	303	83
Indianapolis Racers	81	36	37	8	276	305	80
New England Whalers	81	35	40	6	275	290	76
Birmingham Bulls	81	31	46	4	289	309	66
Minnesota Fighting Saints	42	19	18	5	136	129	43

== Schedule and results ==
1976–77 regular season
October

Game	Result	Date	Score	Opponent	Record
1	W	October 8, 1976	4–3	Minnesota Fighting Saints (1976–77)	1–0–0
2	L	October 10, 1976	1–4	@ Minnesota Fighting Saints (1976–77)	1–1–0
3	W	October 15, 1976	6–5 OT	Cincinnati Stingers (1976–77)	2–1–0
4	L	October 17, 1976	2–7	@ Edmonton Oilers (1976–77)	2–2–0
5	L	October 19, 1976	1–6	@ Winnipeg Jets (1976–77)	2–3–0
6	T	October 21, 1976	4–4	@ San Diego Mariners (1976–77)	2–3–1
7	L	October 23, 1976	1–3	Birmingham Bulls (1976–77)	2–4–1
8	L	October 27, 1976	1–5	San Diego Mariners (1976–77)	2–5–1
9	W	October 29, 1976	6–4	Quebec Nordiques (1976–77)	3–5–1

November

Game	Result	Date	Score	Opponent	Record
10	L	November 3, 1976	2–8	@ Cincinnati Stingers (1976–77)	3–6–1
11	W	November 4, 1976	5–2	Cincinnati Stingers (1976–77)	4–6–1
12	L	November 7, 1976	0–3	@ San Diego Mariners (1976–77)	4–7–1
13	L	November 9, 1976	2–7	@ Houston Aeros (1976–77)	4–8–1
14	T	November 10, 1976	3–3	@ Phoenix Roadrunners (1976–77)	4–8–2
15	L	November 13, 1976	3–7	@ Cincinnati Stingers (1976–77)	4–9–2
16	W	November 14, 1976	3–1	@ Quebec Nordiques (1976–77)	5–9–2
17	W	November 16, 1976	5–3	Cincinnati Stingers (1976–77)	6–9–2
18	W	November 19, 1976	4–0	Birmingham Bulls (1976–77)	7–9–2
19	W	November 20, 1976	8–4	Winnipeg Jets (1976–77)	8–9–2
20	W	November 23, 1976	4–3	New England Whalers (1976–77)	9–9–2
21	W	November 24, 1976	6–4	@ Cincinnati Stingers (1976–77)	10–9–2
22	L	November 25, 1976	0–5	Quebec Nordiques (1976–77)	10–10–2
23	W	November 27, 1976	8–2	@ Quebec Nordiques (1976–77)	11–10–2
24	W	November 28, 1976	4–3	@ New England Whalers (1976–77)	12–10–2

December

Game	Result	Date	Score	Opponent	Record
25	W	December 2, 1976	2–1	Calgary Cowboys (1976–77)	13–10–2
26	W	December 4, 1976	5–3	Edmonton Oilers (1976–77)	14–10–2
27	W	December 7, 1976	3–2 OT	@ Birmingham Bulls (1976–77)	15–10–2
28	W	December 10, 1976	3–2	San Diego Mariners (1976–77)	16–10–2
29	L	December 12, 1976	1–3	Houston Aeros (1976–77)	16–11–2
30	L	December 16, 1976	3–5	Minnesota Fighting Saints (1976–77)	16–12–2
31	W	December 17, 1976	5–4 OT	@ New England Whalers (1976–77)	17–12–2
32	W	December 19, 1976	3–2 OT	Birmingham Bulls (1976–77)	18–12–2
33	L	December 26, 1976	1–2	@ San Diego Mariners (1976–77)	18–13–2
34	L	December 28, 1976	3–4	@ Phoenix Roadrunners (1976–77)	18–14–2

January

Game	Result	Date	Score	Opponent	Record
35	W	January 2, 1977	4–1	Phoenix Roadrunners (1976–77)	19–14–2
36	L	January 4, 1977	1–2	@ Winnipeg Jets (1976–77)	19–15–2
37	L	January 8, 1977	3–4	@ Calgary Cowboys (1976–77)	19–16–2
38	L	January 9, 1977	3–5	@ Edmonton Oilers (1976–77)	19–17–2
39	W	January 11, 1977	4–3 OT	@ Calgary Cowboys (1976–77)	20–17–2
40	W	January 13, 1977	4–1	New England Whalers (1976–77)	21–17–2
41	L	January 14, 1977	5–9	@ Minnesota Fighting Saints (1976–77)	21–18–2
42	W	January 15, 1977	6–3	Edmonton Oilers (1976–77)	22–18–2
43	T	January 21, 1977	1–1	Calgary Cowboys (1976–77)	22–18–3
44	T	January 22, 1977	3–3	@ New England Whalers (1976–77)	22–18–4
45	L	January 23, 1977	2–6	@ Birmingham Bulls (1976–77)	22–19–4
46	L	January 25, 1977	1–2 OT	@ Quebec Nordiques (1976–77)	22–20–4
47	L	January 28, 1977	5–6	Quebec Nordiques (1976–77)	22–21–4
48	W	January 30, 1977	5–0	New England Whalers (1976–77)	23–21–4

February

Game	Result	Date	Score	Opponent	Record
49	L	February 1, 1977	4–5	@ Quebec Nordiques (1976–77)	23–22–4
50	W	February 2, 1977	6–5	Quebec Nordiques (1976–77)	24–22–4
51	W	February 5, 1977	5–2	Birmingham Bulls (1976–77)	25–22–4
52	T	February 6, 1977	5–5	@ New England Whalers (1976–77)	25–22–5
53	T	February 8, 1977	4–4	Houston Aeros (1976–77)	25–22–6
54	L	February 9, 1977	0–9	@ Cincinnati Stingers (1976–77)	25–23–6
55	L	February 11, 1977	1–5	Quebec Nordiques (1976–77)	25–24–6
56	W	February 12, 1977	5–1	@ New England Whalers (1976–77)	26–24–6
57	L	February 13, 1977	5–7	Winnipeg Jets (1976–77)	26–25–6
58	L	February 17, 1977	2–4	@ Winnipeg Jets (1976–77)	26–26–6
59	L	February 19, 1977	5–6	Phoenix Roadrunners (1976–77)	26–27–6
60	T	February 20, 1977	2–2	@ Birmingham Bulls (1976–77)	26–27–7
61	L	February 22, 1977	2–4	@ Quebec Nordiques (1976–77)	26–28–7
62	W	February 25, 1977	3–2 OT	@ Edmonton Oilers (1976–77)	27–28–7
63	L	February 27, 1977	1–2	@ Calgary Cowboys (1976–77)	27–29–7

March

Game	Result	Date	Score	Opponent	Record
64	W	March 4, 1977	7–4	San Diego Mariners (1976–77)	28–29–7
65	L	March 5, 1977	0–6	@ Cincinnati Stingers (1976–77)	28–30–7
66	W	March 6, 1977	3–2 OT	Phoenix Roadrunners (1976–77)	29–30–7
67	L	March 10, 1977	3–4	Edmonton Oilers (1976–77)	29–31–7
68	W	March 12, 1977	7–2	Birmingham Bulls (1976–77)	30–31–7
69	L	March 13, 1977	0–5	@ Houston Aeros (1976–77)	30–32–7
70	W	March 15, 1977	3–1	Calgary Cowboys (1976–77)	31–32–7
71	W	March 17, 1977	5–2	@ Birmingham Bulls (1976–77)	32–32–7
72	L	March 18, 1977	5–7	Winnipeg Jets (1976–77)	32–33–7
73	L	March 20, 1977	3–8	Houston Aeros (1976–77)	32–34–7
74	W	March 22, 1977	3–1	Cincinnati Stingers (1976–77)	33–34–7
75	W	March 24, 1977	4–3	Quebec Nordiques (1976–77)	34–34–7
76	W	March 26, 1977	4–2	@ New England Whalers (1976–77)	35–34–7
77	L	March 27, 1977	3–7	@ Birmingham Bulls (1976–77)	35–35–7
78	T	March 30, 1977	5–5	Cincinnati Stingers (1976–77)	35–35–8

April

Game	Result	Date	Score	Opponent	Record
79	L	April 2, 1977	2–3 OT	New England Whalers (1976–77)	35–36–8
80	W	April 3, 1977	7–3	@ Houston Aeros (1976–77)	36–36–8
81	L	April 6, 1977	3–7	@ Phoenix Roadrunners (1976–77)	36–37–8

Legend: Win (2 points) Loss (0 points) Tie (1 point)

== Playoffs ==
1977 Avco Cup playoffs
Quarterfinals vs. Cincinnati Stingers – Racers win 4–0

Game	Date	Visitor	Score	Home	Series
1	April 9	Indianapolis Racers	4–3	Cincinnati Stingers	1–0
2	April 12	Indianapolis Racers	7–2	Cincinnati Stingers	2–0
3	April 14	Cincinnati Stingers	3–5	Indianapolis Racers	3–0
4	April 16	Cincinnati Stingers	1–3	Indianapolis Racers	4–0

Semifinals vs. Quebec Nordiques – Nordiques win 4–1

Game	Date	Visitor	Score	Home	Series
1	April 23	Indianapolis Racers	1–3	Quebec Nordiques	0–1
2	April 25	Indianapolis Racers	3–8	Quebec Nordiques	0–2
3	April 28	Quebec Nordiques	6–5	Indianapolis Racers	0–3
4	April 30	Quebec Nordiques	0–2	Indianapolis Racers	1–3
5	May 2	Indianapolis Racers	3–8	Quebec Nordiques	1–4

Legend: Win Loss

== Player statistics ==
Regular season
Scoring

Player	Pos	GP	G	A	Pts	PIM	+/-	PPG	SHG	GWG
Daryl Maggs	D	81	16	55	71	114	4	5	1	3
Blair MacDonald	RW	81	34	30	64	28	10	8	0	3
Hugh Harris	C	46	21	35	56	21	10	4	4	0
Rene Leclerc	RW	68	25	30	55	43	−7	2	0	0
Reg Thomas	LW	79	25	30	55	34	−9	5	0	0
Michel Parizeau	C	75	18	37	55	39	6	8	0	0
Pat Stapleton	D	81	8	45	53	29	−28	4	0	0
Gene Peacosh	LW	64	22	26	48	21	−1	6	0	0
Al Karlander	C	65	17	28	45	23	5	4	0	0
Rosaire Paiement	C	67	18	25	43	91	−3	2	0	0
Bob Sicinski	C	60	12	24	36	14	−8	1	0	0
Brian McDonald	C	50	15	13	28	48	−20	5	2	0
Frank Rochon	LW	57	15	8	23	8	−13	2	0	0
Mark Lomenda	RW	56	9	12	21	14	−11	0	0	0
Dave Inkpen	D	32	4	12	16	20	10	0	0	0
Bryon Baltimore	D	55	0	15	15	63	−22	0	0	0
Dick Proceviat	D	55	2	12	14	33	−7	0	0	0
Ken Block	D	52	3	10	13	25	−12	0	0	0
Kim Clackson	D	71	3	8	11	168	−9	0	0	0
Mike Zuke	C	15	3	4	7	2	−2	0	0	0
Brian Coates	LW	16	1	5	6	4	−2	0	0	0
Bryan Campbell	C	8	1	4	5	6	−8	1	0	0
Gary MacGregor	C	16	0	5	5	4	−11	0	0	0
Nick Harbaruk	RW	27	2	2	4	2	−16	0	0	0
Larry Mavety	D	10	2	2	4	8	−1	0	0	0
Randy Burchell	G	5	0	1	1	0	0	0	0	0
Jim Park	G	31	0	1	1	6	0	0	0	0
Andy Brown	G	10	0	0	0	0	0	0	0	0
Michel Dion	G	42	0	0	0	0	0	0	0	0
Paul Hoganson	G	11	0	0	0	2	0	0	0	0

Goaltending

Player	MIN	GP	W	L	T	GA	GAA	SO
Michel Dion	2286	42	17	19	3	128	3.36	1
Jim Park	1727	31	14	12	4	114	3.96	1
Paul Hoganson	395	11	3	2	0	24	3.65	0
Andy Brown	430	10	1	4	1	26	3.63	0
Randy Burchell	136	5	1	0	0	8	3.53	0
Team:	4974	81	36	37	8	300	3.62	2

Playoffs
Scoring

Player	Pos	GP	G	A	Pts	PIM	PPG	SHG	GWG
Reg Thomas	LW	9	7	9	16	4	0	0	0
Blair MacDonald	RW	9	7	8	15	4	0	0	0
Michel Parizeau	C	8	3	6	9	8	0	0	1
Pat Stapleton	D	9	2	6	8	0	0	0	0
Brian McDonald	C	9	3	4	7	33	0	0	2
Gene Peacosh	LW	9	3	3	6	2	0	0	1
Daryl Maggs	D	9	1	4	5	4	0	0	0
Rosaire Paiement	C	9	0	5	5	15	0	0	0
Mark Lomenda	RW	9	3	1	4	17	0	0	0
Al Karlander	C	6	2	1	3	0	0	0	0
Bob Sicinski	C	9	0	3	3	4	0	0	0
Nick Harbaruk	RW	6	1	1	2	0	0	0	0
Rene Leclerc	RW	9	1	1	2	4	0	0	1
Ken Block	D	9	0	2	2	6	0	0	0
Dave Inkpen	D	9	0	2	2	8	0	0	0
Kim Clackson	D	9	0	1	1	24	0	0	0
Paul Hoganson	G	5	0	1	1	0	0	0	0
Frank Rochon	LW	5	0	1	1	0	0	0	0
Bryon Baltimore	D	9	0	0	0	5	0	0	0
Michel Dion	G	4	0	0	0	0	0	0	0
Hugh Harris	C	2	0	0	0	0	0	0	0

Goaltending

Player	MIN	GP	W	L	GA	GAA	SO
Paul Hoganson	348	5	3	2	17	2.93	1
Michel Dion	245	4	2	2	17	4.16	0
Team:	593	9	5	4	34	3.44	1

Note: Pos = Position; GP = Games played; G = Goals; A = Assists; Pts = Points; +/- = plus/minus; PIM = Penalty minutes; PPG = Power-play goals; SHG = Short-handed goals; GWG = Game-winning goals
MIN = Minutes played; W = Wins; L = Losses; T = Ties; GA = Goals-against; GAA = Goals-against average; SO = Shutouts;

== Draft picks ==
Indianapolis's draft picks at the 1976 WHA Amateur Draft.

Round	#	Player	Nationality	College/Junior/Club team (League)
1	4	Bobby Simpson (LW)	Canada	Sherbrooke Castors (QMJHL)
2	15	Alex McKendry (F)	Canada	Sudbury Wolves (OHA)
4	40	Dave Dornseif (D)	United States	Providence College (ECAC)
5	52	Jean Gagnon (D)	Canada	Quebec Remparts (QMJHL)
6	64	Joe Kowal (LW)	Canada	Hamilton Fincups (OHA)
7	76	Greg Malone (C)	Canada	Oshawa Generals (OHA)
8	88	Jim Kirkpatrick (D)	Canada	Toronto Marlboros (OHA)
9	99	Rik Garcia (D)	Canada	Hull Festivals (QMJHL)
10	110	Remi Levesque (C)	Canada	Quebec Remparts (QMJHL)

== See also ==
- 1976–77 WHA season
