= 1976–77 Houston Aeros season =

World Hockey Association team season

1976–77 Houston Aeros
- Division: 1st West
- 1976–77 record: 50–24–6
- Home record: 33–3–4
- Road record: 17–21–2
- Goals for: 320
- Goals against: 241

Team information
- Coach: Bill Dineen
- Captain: Ted Taylor
- Alternate captains: Gordie Howe; Poul Popiel
- Arena: The Summit

Team leaders
- Goals: Rich Preston (38)
- Assists: Terry Ruskowski (60)
- Points: Terry Ruskowski (84)
- Penalty minutes: Cam Connor (224)
- Wins: Ron Grahame (27)
- Goals against average: Ron Grahame (2.74)

The 1976–77 Houston Aeros season was the Aeros' fifth season of operation in the World Hockey Association. The Aeros finished first in the West to qualify for the playoffs. The Aeros lost in the semi-finals to the Winnipeg Jets.

== Regular season ==
=== Final standings ===
Western Division
	GP	W	L	T	GF	GA	PTS
Houston Aeros	80	50	24	6	320	241	106
Winnipeg Jets	80	46	32	2	366	291	94
San Diego Mariners	81	40	37	4	284	283	85
Edmonton Oilers	81	34	43	4	243	304	72
Calgary Cowboys	81	31	43	7	252	296	69
Phoenix Roadrunners	80	28	48	4	281	383	60

== Schedule and results ==
1976–77 regular season
October: 5–2–2, 12 points (home: 4–0–2; road: 1–5–0)

Game	Result	Date	Score	Opponent	Record
1	L	October 8, 1976	2–4	@ Birmingham Bulls (1976–77)	0–1–0
2	W	October 9, 1976	5–3	Phoenix Roadrunners (1976–77)	1–1–0
3	W	October 13, 1976	2–1	Calgary Cowboys (1976–77)	2–1–0
4	W	October 16, 1976	3–0	Birmingham Bulls (1976–77)	3–1–0
5	T	October 19, 1976	4–4	New England Whalers (1976–77)	3–1–1
6	L	October 21, 1976	5–8	@ Birmingham Bulls (1976–77)	3–2–1
7	L	October 22, 1976	2–5	@ New England Whalers (1976–77)	3–3–1
8	L	October 23, 1976	2–6	@ Quebec Nordiques (1976–77)	3–4–1
9	W	October 26, 1976	3–1	Edmonton Oilers (1976–77)	4–4–1
10	T	October 28, 1976	1–1	Minnesota Fighting Saints (1976–77)	4–4–2
11	L	October 30, 1976	4–6	@ Calgary Cowboys (1976–77)	4–5–2
12	W	October 31, 1976	4–0	@ Edmonton Oilers (1976–77)	5–5–2

November: 7–2–1, 15 points (home: 5–0–1; road: 2–2–0)

Game	Result	Date	Score	Opponent	Record
13	W	November 2, 1976	3–1	@ Winnipeg Jets (1976–77)	6–5–2
14	W	November 5, 1976	9–1	Phoenix Roadrunners (1976–77)	7–5–2
15	L	November 6, 1976	1–4	@ San Diego Mariners (1976–77)	7–6–2
16	W	November 9, 1976	7–2	Indianapolis Racers (1976–77)	8–6–2
17	W	November 12, 1976	4–1	San Diego Mariners (1976–77)	9–6–2
18	W	November 16, 1976	4–2	Calgary Cowboys (1976–77)	10–6–2
19	L	November 19, 1976	3–5	@ San Diego Mariners (1976–77)	10–7–2
20	W	November 20, 1976	5–2	@ Phoenix Roadrunners (1976–77)	11–7–2
21	W	November 23, 1976	5–3	Edmonton Oilers (1976–77)	12–7–2
22	T	November 26, 1976	1–1	Winnipeg Jets (1976–77)	12–7–3

December: 6–7–1, 13 points (home: 4–1–1; road: 2–6–0)

Game	Result	Date	Score	Opponent	Record
23	T	December 3, 1976	0–0	Edmonton Oilers (1976–77)	12–7–4
24	L	December 5, 1976	2–7	@ Cincinnati Stingers (1976–77)	12–8–4
25	L	December 8, 1976	1–5	@ New England Whalers (1976–77)	12–9–4
26	L	December 10, 1976	2–6	@ Cincinnati Stingers (1976–77)	12–10–4
27	L	December 11, 1976	1–4	@ Quebec Nordiques (1976–77)	12–11–4
28	W	December 12, 1976	3–1	@ Indianapolis Racers (1976–77)	13–11–4
29	W	December 14, 1976	8–3	Phoenix Roadrunners (1976–77)	14–11–4
30	L	December 17, 1976	3–4	Birmingham Bulls (1976–77)	14–12–4
31	L	December 18, 1976	3–4	@ San Diego Mariners (1976–77)	14–13–4
32	W	December 19, 1976	6–4	@ Phoenix Roadrunners (1976–77)	15–13–4
33	W	December 21, 1976	4–0	New England Whalers (1976–77)	16–13–4
34	W	December 23, 1976	6–5 OT	Cincinnati Stingers (1976–77)	17–13–4
35	L	December 26, 1976	2–6	@ Birmingham Bulls (1976–77)	17–14–4
36	W	December 28, 1976	6–3	Winnipeg Jets (1976–77)	18–14–4

January: 10–2–1, 21 points (home: 5–0–0; road: 5–2–1)

Game	Result	Date	Score	Opponent	Record
37	L	January 2, 1977	2–5	@ Winnipeg Jets (1976–77)	18–15–4
38	W	January 4, 1977	5–3	@ Edmonton Oilers (1976–77)	19–15–4
39	W	January 5, 1977	4–3	@ Calgary Cowboys (1976–77)	20–15–4
40	T	January 7, 1977	1–1	@ Minnesota Fighting Saints (1976–77)	20–15–5
41	L	January 12, 1977	2–4	@ Phoenix Roadrunners (1976–77)	20–16–5
42	W	January 14, 1977	5–3	Birmingham Bulls (1976–77)	21–16–5
43	W	January 16, 1977	3–1	Edmonton Oilers (1976–77)	22–16–5
44	W	January 21, 1977	6–1	Birmingham Bulls (1976–77)	23–16–5
45	W	January 22, 1977	6–0	@ San Diego Mariners (1976–77)	24–16–5
46	W	January 23, 1977	5–3	San Diego Mariners (1976–77)	25–16–5
47	W	January 25, 1977	5–2	Winnipeg Jets (1976–77)	26–16–5
48	W	January 28, 1977	4–1	@ Edmonton Oilers (1976–77)	27–16–5
49	W	January 29, 1977	6–4	@ Calgary Cowboys (1976–77)	28–16–5

February: 9–3–1, 19 points (home: 6–0–0; road: 3–3–1)

Game	Result	Date	Score	Opponent	Record
50	W	February 1, 1977	6–1	Calgary Cowboys (1976–77)	29–16–5
51	L	February 3, 1977	3–5	@ Phoenix Roadrunners (1976–77)	29–17–5
52	W	February 4, 1977	4–1	New England Whalers (1976–77)	30–17–5
53	T	February 8, 1977	4–4	@ Indianapolis Racers (1976–77)	30–17–6
54	W	February 12, 1977	7–3	Quebec Nordiques (1976–77)	31–17–6
55	W	February 15, 1977	4–2	Quebec Nordiques (1976–77)	32–17–6
56	W	February 18, 1977	4–2	San Diego Mariners (1976–77)	33–17–6
57	W	February 19, 1977	5–3	San Diego Mariners (1976–77)	34–17–6
58	L	February 22, 1977	2–3	@ Winnipeg Jets (1976–77)	34–18–6
59	L	February 23, 1977	2–3	@ Calgary Cowboys (1976–77)	34–19–6
60	W	February 25, 1977	9–3	@ Phoenix Roadrunners (1976–77)	35–19–6
61	W	February 26, 1977	5–4	@ San Diego Mariners (1976–77)	36–19–6
62	W	February 27, 1977	5–4	@ Phoenix Roadrunners (1976–77)	37–19–6

March: 10–4–0, 20 points (home: 7–1–0; road: 3–3–0)

Game	Result	Date	Score	Opponent	Record
63	W	March 1, 1977	8–3	Phoenix Roadrunners (1976–77)	38–19–6
64	L	March 4, 1977	2–3	@ New England Whalers (1976–77)	38–20–6
65	W	March 6, 1977	7–3	@ Cincinnati Stingers (1976–77)	39–20–6
66	W	March 8, 1977	5–3	Edmonton Oilers (1976–77)	40–20–6
67	W	March 11, 1977	5–0	Cincinnati Stingers (1976–77)	41–20–6
68	W	March 13, 1977	5–0	Indianapolis Racers (1976–77)	42–20–6
69	W	March 15, 1977	4–3	Quebec Nordiques (1976–77)	43–20–6
70	W	March 18, 1977	6–3	Phoenix Roadrunners (1976–77)	44–20–6
71	W	March 20, 1977	8–3	@ Indianapolis Racers (1976–77)	45–20–6
72	L	March 22, 1977	2–6	@ Quebec Nordiques (1976–77)	45–21–6
73	W	March 25, 1977	4–2	Calgary Cowboys (1976–77)	46–21–6
74	L	March 27, 1977	3–5	Winnipeg Jets (1976–77)	46–22–6
75	W	March 29, 1977	5–2	@ Winnipeg Jets (1976–77)	47–22–6
76	L	March 30, 1977	0–8	@ Edmonton Oilers (1976–77)	47–23–6

April: 3–1–0, 6 points (home: 2–1–0; road: 1–0–0)

Game	Result	Date	Score	Opponent	Record
77	W	April 1, 1977	5–4	Cincinnati Stingers (1976–77)	48–23–6
78	L	April 3, 1977	3–7	Indianapolis Racers (1976–77)	48–24–6
79	W	April 5, 1977	3–1	San Diego Mariners (1976–77)	49–24–6
80	W	April 6, 1977	5–3	@ San Diego Mariners (1976–77)	50–24–6

Legend: Win (2 points) Loss (0 points) Tie (1 point)

== Playoffs ==
The Aeros defeated the Edmonton Oilers in the Division Semi-final 4–1. In the Division Final, the Aeros were defeated by the Winnipeg Jets 4–2 in a rematch of the 1976 Avco Cup final.

1977 Avco Cup playoffs
Quarterfinals vs. Edmonton Oilers – Aeros win 4–1

Game	Date	Visitor	Score	Home	Series
1	April 13	Edmonton Oilers	3–4 OT	Houston Aeros	1–0
2	April 15	Edmonton Oilers	2–6	Houston Aeros	2–0
3	April 17	Houston Aeros	2–7	Edmonton Oilers	2–1
4	April 20	Houston Aeros	4–1	Edmonton Oilers	3–1
5	April 22	Edmonton Oilers	3–4	Houston Aeros	4–1

Semifinals vs. Winnipeg Jets – Jets win 4–2

Game	Date	Visitor	Score	Home	Series
1	April 26	Winnipeg Jets	4–3 OT	Houston Aeros	0–1
2	April 28	Winnipeg Jets	2–7	Houston Aeros	1–1
3	April 30	Houston Aeros	3–4	Winnipeg Jets	1–2
4	May 1	Houston Aeros	4–6	Winnipeg Jets	1–3
5	May 3	Winnipeg Jets	2–3	Houston Aeros	2–3
6	May 5	Houston Aeros	3–6	Winnipeg Jets	2–4

Legend: Win Loss

== Player statistics ==
=== Regular season ===
Scoring

Regular season
Player	Pos	GP	G	A	Pts	PIM	+/-	PPG	SHG	GWG
Terry Ruskowski	C	80	24	60	84	146	31	7	0	5
Rich Preston	RW	80	38	41	79	54	37	6	5	5
Mark Howe	D	57	23	52	75	46	41	5	3	8
Gordie Howe	RW	62	24	44	68	57	27	5	1	3
Poul Popiel	D	80	12	56	68	87	53	2	0	0
Cam Connor	RW	76	35	32	67	224	23	6	1	6
Larry Lund	C	80	29	38	67	36	20	7	0	11
John Tonelli	LW	80	24	31	55	109	14	6	1	0
Ted Taylor	LW	78	16	35	51	90	28	4	0	0
Morris Lukowich	LW	68	27	18	45	67	20	6	0	0
Marty Howe	D	80	17	28	45	103	29	3	0	0
John Gray	RW	47	21	20	41	25	22	3	0	0
Al McLeod	D	51	7	21	28	20	19	1	0	0
Don Larway	RW	75	11	13	24	112	5	3	0	0
Larry Hale	D	67	0	14	14	18	9	0	0	0
Frank Hughes	LW	27	3	8	11	2	−5	0	0	0
Ron Hansis	RW	22	4	3	7	6	−4	0	0	0
Glen Irwin	D	44	2	4	6	168	−12	0	0	0
John Schella	D	20	0	6	6	28	8	0	0	0
Andre Hinse	LW	26	2	3	5	8	−9	0	0	0
Dwayne Pentland	D	29	1	2	3	6	3	0	0	0
Wayne Rutledge	G	42	0	3	3	6	0	0	0	0
Gary Donaldson	RW	5	0	0	0	6	−3	0	0	0
Mike Fedorko	C	4	0	0	0	0	−4	0	0	0
Ron Grahame	G	39	0	0	0	0	0	0	0	0
Steve West	C	3	0	0	0	2	−3	0	0	0

Goaltending
Player	MIN	GP	W	L	T	GA	GAA	SO
Ron Grahame	2345	39	27	10	2	107	2.74	4
Wayne Rutledge	2512	42	23	14	4	132	3.15	3
Team:	4857	80	50	24	6	239	2.95	7

=== Playoffs ===
Player	Pos	GP	G	A	Pts	PIM	PPG	SHG	GWG
Terry Ruskowski	C	11	6	11	17	67	0	0	0
Mark Howe	D	11	4	10	14	2	0	0	1
Morris Lukowich	LW	11	6	4	10	19	0	0	1
Larry Lund	C	11	2	8	10	17	0	0	0
Gordie Howe	RW	11	5	3	8	11	0	0	0
Ted Taylor	LW	11	4	4	8	28	0	0	2
Rich Preston	RW	11	3	5	8	10	0	0	0
Cam Connor	RW	11	3	4	7	47	0	0	0
John Tonelli	LW	11	3	4	7	12	0	0	0
Poul Popiel	D	11	0	7	7	10	0	0	0
Marty Howe	D	11	3	1	4	10	0	0	1
Al McLeod	D	10	1	3	4	9	0	0	0
John Schella	D	6	1	2	3	6	0	0	0
Ron Hansis	RW	8	1	1	2	4	0	0	1
Larry Hale	D	11	0	2	2	6	0	0	0
Don Larway	RW	3	1	0	1	0	0	0	0
Ron Grahame	G	9	0	1	1	2	0	0	0
John Gray	RW	6	0	1	1	8	0	0	0
Dwayne Pentland	D	2	0	0	0	0	0	0	0
Wayne Rutledge	G	2	0	0	0	0	0	0	0
Steve West	C	6	0	0	0	0	0	0	0

Player	MIN	GP	W	L	GA	GAA	SO
Wayne Rutledge	120	2	4	5	4	2.00	0
Ron Grahame	561	9	2	0	36	3.85	0
Team:	681	11	6	5	40	3.52	0

Note: Pos = Position; GP = Games played; G = Goals; A = Assists; Pts = Points; +/- = plus/minus; PIM = Penalty minutes; PPG = Power-play goals; SHG = Short-handed goals; GWG = Game-winning goals
MIN = Minutes played; W = Wins; L = Losses; T = Ties; GA = Goals-against; GAA = Goals-against average; SO = Shutouts;

== Awards and records ==
- Mark Howe, WHA All-Star Team (Second Team)
- Poul Popiel, WHA All-Star Team (Second Team)
- Bill Dineen, Howard Baldwin Trophy (Coach of the Year)

=== WHA All-Star Game (January 18, 1977) ===
- Wayne Rutledge
- Poul Popiel
- Gordie Howe

== Draft picks ==
Houston's draft picks at the 1976 WHA Amateur Draft.

Round	#	Player	Nationality	College/Junior/Club team (League)
2	22	Morris Lukowich (LW)	Canada	Medicine Hat Tigers (WCHL)
3	34	Jim Roberts (LW)	Canada	Ottawa 67's (OHA)
4	46	Mike Fedorko (D)	Canada	Hamilton Fincups (OHA)
5	58	Larry Skinner (C)	Canada	Ottawa 67's (OHA)
6	70	Kevin Schamehorn (RW)	Canada	New Westminster Bruins (WCHL)
7	82	Mike Hordy (D)	Canada	Sault Ste. Marie Greyhounds (OHA)
8	93	Larry Riggin (D)	Canada	London Knights (OHA)
9	104	Bill Wells (LW)	Canada	Cornwall Royals (QMJHL)
10	116	Bob Pazzelli (F)	United States	University of Denver (WCHA)

== See also ==
- 1976–77 WHA season
