= 1976–77 San Diego Mariners season =

1976–77 San Diego Mariners
- Division: 3rd West
- 1976–77 record: 40–37–4
- Home record: 26–10–4
- Road record: 14–27–0
- Goals for: 284
- Goals against: 283

Team information
- Coach: Ron Ingram
- Captain: Andre Lacroix
- Alternate captains: Paul Shmyr; Brent Hughes
- Arena: San Diego Sports Arena

Team leaders
- Goals: Norm Ferguson (39)
- Assists: Andre Lacroix (82)
- Points: Andre Lacroix (114)
- Penalty minutes: Kevin Devine (114)
- Wins: Ernie Wakely (22)
- Goals against average: Ernie Wakely (3.09)

The 1976–77 San Diego Mariners season was the third and final season of operation of the San Diego Mariners of the World Hockey Association (WHA). The Mariners finished third in the Western Division and qualified for the playoffs, losing in the first round to the Winnipeg Jets.

== Regular season ==
=== Final standings ===
Western Division
	GP	W	L	T	GF	GA	PTS
Houston Aeros	80	50	24	6	320	241	106
Winnipeg Jets	80	46	32	2	366	291	94
San Diego Mariners	81	40	37	4	284	283	85
Edmonton Oilers	81	34	43	4	243	304	72
Calgary Cowboys	81	31	43	7	252	296	69
Phoenix Roadrunners	80	28	48	4	281	383	60

== Schedule and results ==
1976–77 regular season
October

Game	Result	Date	Score	Opponent	Record
1	T	October 9, 1976	7–7	Cincinnati Stingers (1976–77)	0–0–1
2	L	October 12, 1976	4–6	@ Quebec Nordiques (1976–77)	0–1–1
3	W	October 15, 1976	7–4	@ Minnesota Fighting Saints (1976–77)	1–1–1
4	W	October 16, 1976	4–2	Calgary Cowboys (1976–77)	2–1–1
5	W	October 17, 1976	3–1	Winnipeg Jets (1976–77)	3–1–1
6	T	October 21, 1976	4–4	Indianapolis Racers (1976–77)	3–1–2
7	L	October 24, 1976	0–6	@ Calgary Cowboys (1976–77)	3–2–2
8	L	October 26, 1976	1–3	@ Minnesota Fighting Saints (1976–77)	3–3–2
9	W	October 27, 1976	5–1	@ Indianapolis Racers (1976–77)	4–3–2
10	L	October 29, 1976	2–4	@ Cincinnati Stingers (1976–77)	4–4–2
11	L	October 31, 1976	4–6	@ Winnipeg Jets (1976–77)	4–5–2

November

Game	Result	Date	Score	Opponent	Record
12	W	November 2, 1976	4–3 OT	@ Birmingham Bulls (1976–77)	5–5–2
13	W	November 6, 1976	4–1	Houston Aeros (1976–77)	6–5–2
14	W	November 7, 1976	3–0	Indianapolis Racers (1976–77)	7–5–2
15	W	November 11, 1976	3–2	@ Birmingham Bulls (1976–77)	8–5–2
16	L	November 12, 1976	1–4	@ Houston Aeros (1976–77)	8–6–2
17	L	November 14, 1976	3–6	@ Phoenix Roadrunners (1976–77)	8–7–2
18	W	November 17, 1976	4–2	Edmonton Oilers (1976–77)	9–7–2
19	W	November 19, 1976	5–3	Houston Aeros (1976–77)	10–7–2
20	L	November 21, 1976	3–4	@ Birmingham Bulls (1976–77)	10–8–2
21	W	November 24, 1976	4–2	Edmonton Oilers (1976–77)	11–8–2
22	W	November 27, 1976	2–0	@ Calgary Cowboys (1976–77)	12–8–2
23	L	November 28, 1976	0–4	@ Edmonton Oilers (1976–77)	12–9–2
24	L	November 30, 1976	2–8	@ Winnipeg Jets (1976–77)	12–10–2

December

Game	Result	Date	Score	Opponent	Record
25	W	December 2, 1976	4–3	Phoenix Roadrunners (1976–77)	13–10–2
26	W	December 4, 1976	4–3	@ Phoenix Roadrunners (1976–77)	14–10–2
27	W	December 8, 1976	6–1	@ Cincinnati Stingers (1976–77)	15–10–2
28	L	December 10, 1976	2–3	@ Indianapolis Racers (1976–77)	15–11–2
29	L	December 11, 1976	2–3	@ New England Whalers (1976–77)	15–12–2
30	W	December 12, 1976	4–2	@ Minnesota Fighting Saints (1976–77)	16–12–2
31	W	December 14, 1976	6–1	@ Edmonton Oilers (1976–77)	17–12–2
32	W	December 16, 1976	3–0	Edmonton Oilers (1976–77)	18–12–2
33	W	December 18, 1976	4–3	Houston Aeros (1976–77)	19–12–2
34	W	December 19, 1976	5–3	Quebec Nordiques (1976–77)	20–12–2
35	W	December 22, 1976	5–4 OT	@ Phoenix Roadrunners (1976–77)	21–12–2
36	L	December 23, 1976	3–5	New England Whalers (1976–77)	21–13–2
37	W	December 26, 1976	2–1	Indianapolis Racers (1976–77)	22–13–2
38	W	December 30, 1976	4–3	Winnipeg Jets (1976–77)	23–13–2

January

Game	Result	Date	Score	Opponent	Record
39	W	January 5, 1977	2–1	@ New England Whalers (1976–77)	24–13–2
40	L	January 8, 1977	1–2	@ Cincinnati Stingers (1976–77)	24–14–2
41	L	January 9, 1977	2–5	@ Quebec Nordiques (1976–77)	24–15–2
42	L	January 13, 1977	2–7	Cincinnati Stingers (1976–77)	24–16–2
43	L	January 15, 1977	3–5	Calgary Cowboys (1976–77)	24–17–2
44	W	January 16, 1977	5–2	Birmingham Bulls (1976–77)	25–17–2
45	W	January 20, 1977	5–1	Edmonton Oilers (1976–77)	26–17–2
46	L	January 22, 1977	0–6	Houston Aeros (1976–77)	26–18–2
47	L	January 23, 1977	3–5	@ Houston Aeros (1976–77)	26–19–2
48	L	January 27, 1977	3–5	New England Whalers (1976–77)	26–20–2
49	W	January 29, 1977	5–3	Winnipeg Jets (1976–77)	27–20–2

February

Game	Result	Date	Score	Opponent	Record
50	W	February 1, 1977	5–1	Phoenix Roadrunners (1976–77)	28–20–2
51	W	February 2, 1977	6–4	Calgary Cowboys (1976–77)	29–20–2
52	L	February 4, 1977	2–8	@ Winnipeg Jets (1976–77)	29–21–2
53	L	February 6, 1977	2–4	@ Edmonton Oilers (1976–77)	29–22–2
54	W	February 8, 1977	6–5	@ Edmonton Oilers (1976–77)	30–22–2
55	W	February 11, 1977	5–3	@ Phoenix Roadrunners (1976–77)	31–22–2
56	W	February 12, 1977	3–2 OT	Birmingham Bulls (1976–77)	32–22–2
57	W	February 13, 1977	5–2	Phoenix Roadrunners (1976–77)	33–22–2
58	L	February 16, 1977	2–4	Quebec Nordiques (1976–77)	33–23–2
59	L	February 18, 1977	2–4	@ Houston Aeros (1976–77)	33–24–2
60	L	February 19, 1977	3–5	@ Houston Aeros (1976–77)	33–25–2
61	T	February 24, 1977	3–3	Phoenix Roadrunners (1976–77)	33–25–3
62	L	February 26, 1977	4–5	Houston Aeros (1976–77)	33–26–3

March

Game	Result	Date	Score	Opponent	Record
63	L	March 2, 1977	0–2	@ New England Whalers (1976–77)	33–27–3
64	L	March 4, 1977	4–7	@ Indianapolis Racers (1976–77)	33–28–3
65	L	March 5, 1977	0–6	@ Quebec Nordiques (1976–77)	33–29–3
66	L	March 6, 1977	2–4	@ Calgary Cowboys (1976–77)	33–30–3
67	L	March 8, 1977	0–5	@ Winnipeg Jets (1976–77)	33–31–3
68	L	March 9, 1977	3–4	@ Calgary Cowboys (1976–77)	33–32–3
69	L	March 12, 1977	6–7 OT	Phoenix Roadrunners (1976–77)	33–33–3
70	T	March 15, 1977	4–4	Phoenix Roadrunners (1976–77)	33–33–4
71	L	March 19, 1977	5–7	@ Phoenix Roadrunners (1976–77)	33–34–4
72	W	March 20, 1977	6–1	Phoenix Roadrunners (1976–77)	34–34–4
73	W	March 24, 1977	6–2	Birmingham Bulls (1976–77)	35–34–4
74	W	March 25, 1977	7–3	@ Phoenix Roadrunners (1976–77)	36–34–4
75	W	March 26, 1977	4–2	Calgary Cowboys (1976–77)	37–34–4
76	L	March 29, 1977	4–5	New England Whalers (1976–77)	37–35–4
77	W	March 31, 1977	4–3	Winnipeg Jets (1976–77)	38–35–4

April

Game	Result	Date	Score	Opponent	Record
78	W	April 2, 1977	6–3	Cincinnati Stingers (1976–77)	39–35–4
79	W	April 3, 1977	7–0	Quebec Nordiques (1976–77)	40–35–4
80	L	April 5, 1977	1–3	@ Houston Aeros (1976–77)	40–36–4
81	L	April 6, 1977	3–5	Houston Aeros (1976–77)	40–37–4

Legend: Win (2 points) Loss (0 points) Tie (1 point)

== Playoffs ==
1977 Avco Cup playoffs
Quarterfinals vs. Winnipeg Jets – Jets win 4–3

Game	Date	Visitor	Score	Home	Series
1	April 10	San Diego Mariners	1–5	Winnipeg Jets	0–1
2	April 12	San Diego Mariners	1–4	Winnipeg Jets	0–2
3	April 16	Winnipeg Jets	4–5	San Diego Mariners	1–2
4	April 17	Winnipeg Jets	4–6	San Diego Mariners	2–2
5	April 20	San Diego Mariners	0–3	Winnipeg Jets	2–3
6	April 22	Winnipeg Jets	1–3	San Diego Mariners	3–3
7	April 24	San Diego Mariners	3–7	Winnipeg Jets	3–4

Legend: Win Loss

== Player statistics ==
Regular season
Scoring

Player	Pos	GP	G	A	Pts	PIM	+/-	PPG	SHG	GWG
Andre Lacroix	C	81	32	82	114	79	2	11	3	0
Joe Noris	C/D	73	35	57	92	30	2	9	6	5
Norm Ferguson	RW	77	39	32	71	5	−5	10	0	8
Kevin Devine	LW	81	30	20	50	114	−12	7	1	0
Paul Shmyr	D	81	13	37	50	103	−4	3	0	0
Wayne Rivers	RW	60	18	31	49	40	5	7	0	0
Don Burgess	LW	77	20	22	42	8	−8	4	1	0
Kevin Morrison	D	75	8	30	38	68	−30	4	0	0
John French	C/LW	44	14	21	35	6	−3	2	0	0
Gary Veneruzzo	W	40	14	11	25	18	4	3	0	0
Tony Cassolato	RW	43	13	12	25	26	9	2	0	0
Bob Dobek	C	58	7	17	24	17	−9	2	0	0
Brad Rhiness	C	58	9	14	23	14	−17	0	0	0
Dick Sentes	LW	24	10	11	21	16	7	2	0	0
Gerry Pinder	LW	44	6	13	19	36	−24	2	0	0
Brent Hughes	D	62	4	13	17	48	−3	0	0	0
Larry Hornung	D	58	4	9	13	8	−7	0	0	0
Randy Legge	D	69	1	9	10	69	−18	0	0	0
Peter McNamee	D	41	3	6	9	38	−7	0	0	0
Ray Adduono	C	13	2	5	7	5	1	1	0	0
Bob Falkenberg	D	64	0	6	6	34	−11	0	0	0
Gregg Boddy	D	18	1	2	3	19	−6	0	0	0
Norm Cournoyer	C	19	1	2	3	8	−14	0	0	0
Tim O'Connell	RW	16	0	3	3	4	−12	0	0	0
Ernie Wakely	G	46	0	1	1	0	0	0	0	0
Ken Lockett	G	45	0	0	0	15	0	0	0	0
Bob Winograd	D	1	0	0	0	0	1	0	0	0

Goaltending

Player	MIN	GP	W	L	T	GA	GAA	SO
Ernie Wakely	2506	46	22	18	3	129	3.09	3
Ken Lockett	2397	45	18	19	1	148	3.70	1
Team:	4903	81	40	37	4	277	3.39	4

Playoffs
Scoring

Player	Pos	GP	G	A	Pts	PIM	PPG	SHG	GWG
Andre Lacroix	C	7	1	6	7	6	0	0	0
Norm Ferguson	RW	7	2	4	6	0	0	0	1
Ray Adduono	C	7	3	2	5	18	0	0	0
John French	C/LW	7	2	3	5	2	0	0	0
Dick Sentes	LW	5	4	0	4	12	0	0	2
Don Burgess	LW	7	2	2	4	0	0	0	0
Kevin Devine	LW	7	1	3	4	14	0	0	0
Kevin Morrison	D	7	1	3	4	8	0	0	0
Brent Hughes	D	7	0	4	4	0	0	0	0
Joe Noris	C/D	7	2	1	3	6	0	0	0
Wayne Rivers	RW	7	1	1	2	2	0	0	0
Paul Shmyr	D	7	0	2	2	8	0	0	0
Brad Rhiness	C	5	0	1	1	0	0	0	0
Tony Cassolato	RW	3	0	0	0	4	0	0	0
Bob Dobek	C	5	0	0	0	4	0	0	0
Bob Falkenberg	D	2	0	0	0	0	0	0	0
Larry Hornung	D	6	0	0	0	0	0	0	0
Randy Legge	D	7	0	0	0	18	0	0	0
Ken Lockett	G	5	0	0	0	0	0	0	0
Peter McNamee	D	2	0	0	0	2	0	0	0
Gary Veneruzzo	W	7	0	0	0	0	0	0	0
Ernie Wakely	G	3	0	0	0	0	0	0	0

Goaltending

Player	MIN	GP	W	L	GA	GAA	SO
Ernie Wakely	160	3	2	1	9	3.38	0
Ken Lockett	260	5	1	3	19	4.38	0
Team:	420	7	3	4	28	4.00	0

Note: Pos = Position; GP = Games played; G = Goals; A = Assists; Pts = Points; +/- = plus/minus; PIM = Penalty minutes; PPG = Power-play goals; SHG = Short-handed goals; GWG = Game-winning goals
MIN = Minutes played; W = Wins; L = Losses; T = Ties; GA = Goals-against; GAA = Goals-against average; SO = Shutouts;

== Draft picks ==
San Diego's draft picks at the 1976 WHA Amateur Draft.

Round	#	Player	Nationality	College/Junior/Club team (League)
1	5	Dave Farrish (D)	Canada	Sudbury Wolves (OHA)
3	23	Romano Carlucci (F)	Canada	Sault Ste. Marie Greyhounds (OHA)
3	25	Mark Suzor (D)	Canada	Kingston Canadians (OHA)
3	29	Tony Horvath (D)	Canada	Sault Ste. Marie Greyhounds (OHA)
4	41	John Smrke (C)	Canada	Toronto Marlboros (OHA)
5	53	Archie King (RW)	Canada	Hamilton Fincups (OHA)
6	65	Rick Hodgson (D)	Canada	Calgary Centennials (WCHL)
7	77	Rob Tudor (C)	Canada	Regina Pats (WCHL)
8	89	Claude Legris (G)	Canada	Sorel Black Hawks (QMJHL)
9	100	Don Moores (C)	Canada	Kamloops Chiefs (WCHL)
10	111	Ron Roscoe (D)	Canada	Hamilton Fincups (OHA)

== See also ==
- 1976–77 WHA season
