= 1976–77 New England Whalers season =

1976–77 New England Whalers
- Division: 4th East
- 1976–77 record: 35–40–6
- Home record: 20–16–4
- Road record: 15–24–2
- Goals for: 275
- Goals against: 290

Team information
- General manager: Ron Ryan
- Coach: Harry Neale
- Captain: Rick Ley
- Arena: Hartford Civic Center

Team leaders
- Goals: George Lyle (39)
- Assists: Mike Rogers (57)
- Points: Tom Webster (85)
- Penalty minutes: Gordie Roberts (169)
- Wins: Christer Abrahamsson (15)
- Goals against average: Cap Raeder (3.12)

The 1976–77 New England Whalers season was the fifth season of operation of the New England Whalers in the World Hockey Association. The Whalers placed fourth in the Eastern Division, qualifying fourth for the playoffs, losing in the first round to the Quebec Nordiques.

== Regular season ==
=== Final standings ===
Eastern Division
| | GP | W | L | T | GF | GA | PTS |
|---|---|---|---|---|---|---|---|
| Quebec Nordiques | 81 | 47 | 31 | 3 | 353 | 295 | 97 |
| Cincinnati Stingers | 81 | 39 | 37 | 5 | 354 | 303 | 83 |
| Indianapolis Racers | 81 | 36 | 37 | 8 | 276 | 305 | 80 |
| New England Whalers | 81 | 35 | 40 | 6 | 275 | 290 | 76 |
| Birmingham Bulls | 81 | 31 | 46 | 4 | 289 | 309 | 66 |
| Minnesota Fighting Saints | 42 | 19 | 18 | 5 | 136 | 129 | 43 |

== Schedule and results ==
1976–77 regular season
October

| Game | Result | Date | Score | Opponent | Record |
|---|---|---|---|---|---|
| 1 | L | October 8, 1976 | 0–2 | @ Edmonton Oilers (1976–77) | 0–1–0 |
| 2 | L | October 10, 1976 | 2–5 | @ Winnipeg Jets (1976–77) | 0–2–0 |
| 3 | L | October 16, 1976 | 2–8 | Quebec Nordiques (1976–77) | 0–3–0 |
| 4 | T | October 19, 1976 | 4–4 | @ Houston Aeros (1976–77) | 0–3–1 |
| 5 | W | October 22, 1976 | 5–2 | Houston Aeros (1976–77) | 1–3–1 |
| 6 | W | October 23, 1976 | 5–4 | Cincinnati Stingers (1976–77) | 2–3–1 |
| 7 | L | October 26, 1976 | 0–1 | Cincinnati Stingers (1976–77) | 2–4–1 |
| 8 | W | October 29, 1976 | 5–1 | Phoenix Roadrunners (1976–77) | 3–4–1 |
| 9 | W | October 30, 1976 | 5–4 | Birmingham Bulls (1976–77) | 4–4–1 |

November

| Game | Result | Date | Score | Opponent | Record |
|---|---|---|---|---|---|
| 10 | W | November 5, 1976 | 4–3 | @ Edmonton Oilers (1976–77) | 5–4–1 |
| 11 | L | November 7, 1976 | 2–4 | @ Calgary Cowboys (1976–77) | 5–5–1 |
| 12 | L | November 9, 1976 | 4–5 OT | @ Winnipeg Jets (1976–77) | 5–6–1 |
| 13 | T | November 11, 1976 | 3–3 | @ Minnesota Fighting Saints (1976–77) | 5–6–2 |
| 14 | L | November 12, 1976 | 1–3 | @ Phoenix Roadrunners (1976–77) | 5–7–2 |
| 15 | W | November 16, 1976 | 5–4 | @ Birmingham Bulls (1976–77) | 6–7–2 |
| 16 | W | November 17, 1976 | 6–4 | Birmingham Bulls (1976–77) | 7–7–2 |
| 17 | L | November 19, 1976 | 3–7 | Winnipeg Jets (1976–77) | 7–8–2 |
| 18 | T | November 20, 1976 | 3–3 | Minnesota Fighting Saints (1976–77) | 7–8–3 |
| 19 | L | November 23, 1976 | 3–4 | @ Indianapolis Racers (1976–77) | 7–9–3 |
| 20 | W | November 25, 1976 | 5–3 | @ Birmingham Bulls (1976–77) | 8–9–3 |
| 21 | L | November 27, 1976 | 1–3 | Minnesota Fighting Saints (1976–77) | 8–10–3 |
| 22 | L | November 28, 1976 | 3–4 | Indianapolis Racers (1976–77) | 8–11–3 |
| 23 | L | November 30, 1976 | 1–2 | @ Quebec Nordiques (1976–77) | 8–12–3 |

December

| Game | Result | Date | Score | Opponent | Record |
|---|---|---|---|---|---|
| 24 | W | December 1, 1976 | 8–4 | Calgary Cowboys (1976–77) | 9–12–3 |
| 25 | T | December 3, 1976 | 5–5 | Quebec Nordiques (1976–77) | 9–12–4 |
| 26 | L | December 4, 1976 | 2–6 | Winnipeg Jets (1976–77) | 9–13–4 |
| 27 | L | December 7, 1976 | 2–4 | @ Minnesota Fighting Saints (1976–77) | 9–14–4 |
| 28 | W | December 8, 1976 | 5–1 | Houston Aeros (1976–77) | 10–14–4 |
| 29 | W | December 11, 1976 | 3–2 | San Diego Mariners (1976–77) | 11–14–4 |
| 30 | L | December 12, 1976 | 1–5 | @ Quebec Nordiques (1976–77) | 11–15–4 |
| 31 | W | December 14, 1976 | 3–1 | @ Quebec Nordiques (1976–77) | 12–15–4 |
| 32 | L | December 17, 1976 | 4–5 OT | Indianapolis Racers (1976–77) | 12–16–4 |
| 33 | W | December 18, 1976 | 6–2 | Birmingham Bulls (1976–77) | 13–16–4 |
| 34 | L | December 21, 1976 | 0–4 | @ Houston Aeros (1976–77) | 13–17–4 |
| 35 | W | December 23, 1976 | 5–3 | @ San Diego Mariners (1976–77) | 14–17–4 |
| 36 | W | December 26, 1976 | 3–2 | Minnesota Fighting Saints (1976–77) | 15–17–4 |
| 37 | L | December 28, 1976 | 4–5 | @ Minnesota Fighting Saints (1976–77) | 15–18–4 |
| 38 | W | December 30, 1976 | 6–4 | @ Cincinnati Stingers (1976–77) | 16–18–4 |

January

| Game | Result | Date | Score | Opponent | Record |
|---|---|---|---|---|---|
| 39 | W | January 2, 1977 | 3–2 | Cincinnati Stingers (1976–77) | 17–18–4 |
| 40 | L | January 4, 1977 | 3–5 | @ Quebec Nordiques (1976–77) | 17–19–4 |
| 41 | L | January 5, 1977 | 1–2 | San Diego Mariners (1976–77) | 17–20–4 |
| 42 | L | January 7, 1977 | 3–7 | Quebec Nordiques (1976–77) | 17–21–4 |
| 43 | L | January 8, 1977 | 3–4 | Phoenix Roadrunners (1976–77) | 17–22–4 |
| 44 | L | January 11, 1977 | 2–8 | @ Cincinnati Stingers (1976–77) | 17–23–4 |
| 45 | L | January 13, 1977 | 1–4 | @ Indianapolis Racers (1976–77) | 17–24–4 |
| 46 | L | January 14, 1977 | 3–5 | Edmonton Oilers (1976–77) | 17–25–4 |
| 47 | L | January 20, 1977 | 4–5 | Quebec Nordiques (1976–77) | 17–26–4 |
| 48 | T | January 22, 1977 | 3–3 | Indianapolis Racers (1976–77) | 17–26–5 |
| 49 | W | January 23, 1977 | 4–3 OT | Cincinnati Stingers (1976–77) | 18–26–5 |
| 50 | L | January 25, 1977 | 2–4 | @ Cincinnati Stingers (1976–77) | 18–27–5 |
| 51 | W | January 27, 1977 | 5–3 | @ San Diego Mariners (1976–77) | 19–27–5 |
| 52 | W | January 28, 1977 | 6–2 | @ Phoenix Roadrunners (1976–77) | 20–27–5 |
| 53 | L | January 30, 1977 | 0–5 | @ Indianapolis Racers (1976–77) | 20–28–5 |

February

| Game | Result | Date | Score | Opponent | Record |
|---|---|---|---|---|---|
| 54 | L | February 1, 1977 | 3–4 | @ Birmingham Bulls (1976–77) | 20–29–5 |
| 55 | L | February 4, 1977 | 1–4 | @ Houston Aeros (1976–77) | 20–30–5 |
| 56 | L | February 5, 1977 | 3–8 | @ Cincinnati Stingers (1976–77) | 20–31–5 |
| 57 | T | February 6, 1977 | 5–5 | Indianapolis Racers (1976–77) | 20–31–6 |
| 58 | W | February 10, 1977 | 6–3 | Winnipeg Jets (1976–77) | 21–31–6 |
| 59 | L | February 12, 1977 | 1–5 | Indianapolis Racers (1976–77) | 21–32–6 |
| 60 | W | February 13, 1977 | 5–4 | @ Cincinnati Stingers (1976–77) | 22–32–6 |
| 61 | W | February 17, 1977 | 4–2 | Phoenix Roadrunners (1976–77) | 23–32–6 |
| 62 | L | February 18, 1977 | 2–3 | Birmingham Bulls (1976–77) | 23–33–6 |
| 63 | W | February 20, 1977 | 5–0 | @ Calgary Cowboys (1976–77) | 24–33–6 |
| 64 | L | February 22, 1977 | 3–4 | @ Edmonton Oilers (1976–77) | 24–34–6 |
| 65 | W | February 25, 1977 | 3–2 | @ Calgary Cowboys (1976–77) | 25–34–6 |
| 66 | W | February 27, 1977 | 3–2 | @ Winnipeg Jets (1976–77) | 26–34–6 |

March

| Game | Result | Date | Score | Opponent | Record |
|---|---|---|---|---|---|
| 67 | W | March 2, 1977 | 2–0 | San Diego Mariners (1976–77) | 27–34–6 |
| 68 | W | March 4, 1977 | 3–2 | Houston Aeros (1976–77) | 28–34–6 |
| 69 | W | March 6, 1977 | 6–2 | Quebec Nordiques (1976–77) | 29–34–6 |
| 70 | L | March 9, 1977 | 3–4 OT | @ Birmingham Bulls (1976–77) | 29–35–6 |
| 71 | L | March 11, 1977 | 3–6 | @ Birmingham Bulls (1976–77) | 29–36–6 |
| 72 | L | March 13, 1977 | 3–5 | @ Quebec Nordiques (1976–77) | 29–37–6 |
| 73 | W | March 18, 1977 | 3–1 | Calgary Cowboys (1976–77) | 30–37–6 |
| 74 | W | March 20, 1977 | 9–0 | Calgary Cowboys (1976–77) | 31–37–6 |
| 75 | L | March 24, 1977 | 4–5 | Edmonton Oilers (1976–77) | 31–38–6 |
| 76 | L | March 26, 1977 | 2–4 | Indianapolis Racers (1976–77) | 31–39–6 |
| 77 | W | March 27, 1977 | 5–2 | Edmonton Oilers (1976–77) | 32–39–6 |
| 78 | W | March 29, 1977 | 5–4 | @ San Diego Mariners (1976–77) | 33–39–6 |
| 79 | W | March 31, 1977 | 6–2 | @ Phoenix Roadrunners (1976–77) | 34–39–6 |

April

| Game | Result | Date | Score | Opponent | Record |
|---|---|---|---|---|---|
| 80 | W | April 2, 1977 | 3–2 OT | @ Indianapolis Racers (1976–77) | 35–39–6 |
| 81 | L | April 5, 1977 | 2–7 | @ Quebec Nordiques (1976–77) | 35–40–6 |

Legend: Win (2 points) Loss (0 points) Tie (1 point)

== Playoffs ==
The Whalers met the Quebec Nordiques in the first round of the playoffs. The Nordiques defeated the Whalers 4–1 to win the round. The Nordiques would go on to win the league championship.

1977 Avco Cup playoffs
Division Quarterfinals vs. Quebec Nordiques – Nordiques win 4–1

| Game | Date | Visitor | Score | Home | Series |
|---|---|---|---|---|---|
| 1 | April 9 | New England Whalers | 2–5 | Quebec Nordiques | 0–1 |
| 2 | April 12 | New England Whalers | 3–7 | Quebec Nordiques | 0–2 |
| 3 | April 14 | Quebec Nordiques | 4 – 3 OT | New England Whalers | 0–3 |
| 4 | April 16 | Quebec Nordiques | 4–6 | New England Whalers | 1–3 |
| 5 | April 19 | New England Whalers | 0–3 | Quebec Nordiques | 1–4 |

Legend: Win Loss

== Draft picks ==
New England's draft picks at the 1976 WHA Amateur Draft.

| Round | # | Player | Nationality | College/Junior/Club team (League) |
|---|---|---|---|---|
| 2 | 13 | Mike Fidler (LW) | United States | Boston University (ECAC) |
| 3 | 26 | Fred Williams (C) | Canada | Saskatoon Blades (WCHL) |
| 3 | 31 | Dave Debol (C) | United States | University of Michigan (WCHA) |
| 4 | 38 | Mike Kaszycki (F) | Canada | Sault Ste. Marie Greyhounds (OHA) |
| 5 | 49 | Bill Baker (D) | United States | University of Minnesota (WCHA) |
| 5 | 50 | Mike Liut (G) | Canada | Bowling Green State University (CCHA) |
| 6 | 62 | Dwight Schofield (D) | Canada | London Knights (OHA) |
| 7 | 74 | Warren Young (F) | Canada | Michigan Tech (WCHA) |
| 8 | 86 | Ken Morrow (D) | United States | Bowling Green State University (CCHA) |
| 9 | 97 | Ed Clarey (F) | Canada | Cornwall Royals (QMJHL) |
| 10 | 108 | Jon Hammond (LW) | Canada | Regina Pats (WCHL) |

== See also ==
- 1976–77 WHA season
