= 1976–77 Cincinnati Stingers season =

World Hockey Association team season

1976–77 Cincinnati Stingers
- Division: 2nd East
- 1976–77 record: 39–37–5
- Home record: 29–10–1
- Road record: 10–27–4
- Goals for: 354
- Goals against: 303

Team information
- Coach: Terry Slater
- Captain: Rick Dudley
- Alternate captains: Rich LeDuc; Dennis Sobchuk; Ron Plumb
- Arena: Riverfront Coliseum

Team leaders
- Goals: Rich LeDuc; Blaine Stoughton (52)
- Assists: Ron Plumb (58)
- Points: Rich LeDuc (107)
- Penalty minutes: Pierre Roy (126)
- Wins: Norm LaPointe (21)
- Goals against average: Jacques Caron (2.83)

The 1976–77 Cincinnati Stingers season was the Stingers' second season of operation in the World Hockey Association (WHA). The Stingers lost to the Indianapolis Racers in the first round of the 1977 WHA playoffs in a four-game sweep, with Game 1 going to three overtimes, setting a new record for the longest game in WHA history. Cincinnati played thirteen games in the regular season/postseason and went 0–8–5, failing to win an overtime game all year. They lost the services of goaltender Jacques Caron, who had gone 13–6–2 with 2.83 GAA when he suffered a rib injury during warmups of Game 1; he played less than ten minutes of Game 2.

== Regular season ==
=== Final standings ===
Eastern Division
	GP	W	L	T	GF	GA	PTS
Quebec Nordiques	81	47	31	3	353	295	97
Cincinnati Stingers	81	39	37	5	354	303	83
Indianapolis Racers	81	36	37	8	276	305	80
New England Whalers	81	35	40	6	275	290	76
Birmingham Bulls	81	31	46	4	289	309	66
Minnesota Fighting Saints	42	19	18	5	136	129	43

== Schedule and results ==
1976–77 regular season
October

Game	Result	Date	Score	Opponent	Record
1	W	October 7, 1976	7–2	@ Minnesota Fighting Saints (1976–77)	1–0–0
2	L	October 8, 1976	6–8	@ Phoenix Roadrunners (1976–77)	1–1–0
3	T	October 9, 1976	7–7	@ San Diego Mariners (1976–77)	1–1–1
4	T	October 14, 1976	7–7	@ Birmingham Bulls (1976–77)	1–1–2
5	L	October 15, 1976	5–6 OT	@ Indianapolis Racers (1976–77)	1–2–2
6	W	October 17, 1976	5–2	@ Quebec Nordiques (1976–77)	2–2–2
7	W	October 19, 1976	4–2	@ Minnesota Fighting Saints (1976–77)	3–2–2
8	L	October 23, 1976	4–5	@ New England Whalers (1976–77)	3–3–2
9	W	October 26, 1976	1–0	@ New England Whalers (1976–77)	4–3–2
10	W	October 29, 1976	4–2	San Diego Mariners (1976–77)	5–3–2
11	W	October 30, 1976	9–3	Phoenix Roadrunners (1976–77)	6–3–2

November

Game	Result	Date	Score	Opponent	Record
12	W	November 3, 1976	8–2	Indianapolis Racers (1976–77)	7–3–2
13	L	November 4, 1976	2–5	@ Indianapolis Racers (1976–77)	7–4–2
14	W	November 6, 1976	7–3	Winnipeg Jets (1976–77)	8–4–2
15	W	November 10, 1976	4–2	Edmonton Oilers (1976–77)	9–4–2
16	W	November 13, 1976	7–3	Indianapolis Racers (1976–77)	10–4–2
17	L	November 16, 1976	3–5	@ Indianapolis Racers (1976–77)	10–5–2
18	L	November 19, 1976	3–4 OT	@ Edmonton Oilers (1976–77)	10–6–2
19	W	November 21, 1976	4–2	@ Winnipeg Jets (1976–77)	11–6–2
20	L	November 23, 1976	0–4	@ Minnesota Fighting Saints (1976–77)	11–7–2
21	L	November 24, 1976	4–6	Indianapolis Racers (1976–77)	11–8–2
22	W	November 27, 1976	2–1	Birmingham Bulls (1976–77)	12–8–2
23	L	November 30, 1976	1–3	@ Birmingham Bulls (1976–77)	12–9–2

December

Game	Result	Date	Score	Opponent	Record
24	W	December 3, 1976	6–4	Calgary Cowboys (1976–77)	13–9–2
25	W	December 5, 1976	7–2	Houston Aeros (1976–77)	14–9–2
26	L	December 8, 1976	1–6	San Diego Mariners (1976–77)	14–10–2
27	W	December 10, 1976	6–2	Houston Aeros (1976–77)	15–10–2
28	W	December 12, 1976	8–0	Phoenix Roadrunners (1976–77)	16–10–2
29	W	December 15, 1976	5–0	Minnesota Fighting Saints (1976–77)	17–10–2
30	L	December 18, 1976	3–4	@ Minnesota Fighting Saints (1976–77)	17–11–2
31	L	December 19, 1976	2–4	@ Edmonton Oilers (1976–77)	17–12–2
32	L	December 22, 1976	2–6	Birmingham Bulls (1976–77)	17–13–2
33	L	December 23, 1976	5–6 OT	@ Houston Aeros (1976–77)	17–14–2
34	L	December 26, 1976	3–6	@ Calgary Cowboys (1976–77)	17–15–2
35	L	December 30, 1976	4–6	New England Whalers (1976–77)	17–16–2

January

Game	Result	Date	Score	Opponent	Record
36	L	January 2, 1977	2–3	@ New England Whalers (1976–77)	17–17–2
37	W	January 7, 1977	7–1	Birmingham Bulls (1976–77)	18–17–2
38	W	January 8, 1977	2–1	San Diego Mariners (1976–77)	19–17–2
39	W	January 11, 1977	8–2	New England Whalers (1976–77)	20–17–2
40	W	January 13, 1977	7–2	@ San Diego Mariners (1976–77)	21–17–2
41	L	January 14, 1977	5–6 OT	@ Phoenix Roadrunners (1976–77)	21–18–2
42	W	January 16, 1977	6–4	@ Winnipeg Jets (1976–77)	22–18–2
43	L	January 20, 1977	4–9	@ Phoenix Roadrunners (1976–77)	22–19–2
44	L	January 21, 1977	5–6 OT	@ Winnipeg Jets (1976–77)	22–20–2
45	L	January 23, 1977	3–4 OT	@ New England Whalers (1976–77)	22–21–2
46	W	January 25, 1977	4–2	New England Whalers (1976–77)	23–21–2
47	L	January 29, 1977	2–7	@ Quebec Nordiques (1976–77)	23–22–2
48	L	January 30, 1977	1–7	@ Birmingham Bulls (1976–77)	23–23–2

February

Game	Result	Date	Score	Opponent	Record
49	L	February 2, 1977	2–3	Birmingham Bulls (1976–77)	23–24–2
50	W	February 5, 1977	8–3	New England Whalers (1976–77)	24–24–2
51	L	February 6, 1977	1–6	@ Quebec Nordiques (1976–77)	24–25–2
52	W	February 9, 1977	9–0	Indianapolis Racers (1976–77)	25–25–2
53	W	February 11, 1977	4–0	Winnipeg Jets (1976–77)	26–25–2
54	L	February 13, 1977	4–5	New England Whalers (1976–77)	26–26–2
55	W	February 15, 1977	7–4	@ Edmonton Oilers (1976–77)	27–26–2
56	W	February 16, 1977	7–3	@ Calgary Cowboys (1976–77)	28–26–2
57	L	February 18, 1977	3–5	@ Calgary Cowboys (1976–77)	28–27–2
58	W	February 19, 1977	3–1	Quebec Nordiques (1976–77)	29–27–2
59	W	February 20, 1977	4–3	Phoenix Roadrunners (1976–77)	30–27–2
60	T	February 22, 1977	4–4	@ Birmingham Bulls (1976–77)	30–27–3
61	W	February 25, 1977	5–2	Quebec Nordiques (1976–77)	31–27–3
62	L	February 26, 1977	6–8	Winnipeg Jets (1976–77)	31–28–3

March

Game	Result	Date	Score	Opponent	Record
63	W	March 5, 1977	6–0	Indianapolis Racers (1976–77)	32–28–3
64	L	March 6, 1977	3–7	Houston Aeros (1976–77)	32–29–3
65	W	March 9, 1977	5–3	Edmonton Oilers (1976–77)	33–29–3
66	L	March 11, 1977	0–5	@ Houston Aeros (1976–77)	33–30–3
67	W	March 12, 1977	9–2	Calgary Cowboys (1976–77)	34–30–3
68	W	March 13, 1977	7–4	Birmingham Bulls (1976–77)	35–30–3
69	L	March 15, 1977	2–4	@ Birmingham Bulls (1976–77)	35–31–3
70	W	March 16, 1977	4–3	Calgary Cowboys (1976–77)	36–31–3
71	W	March 18, 1977	7–3	Quebec Nordiques (1976–77)	37–31–3
72	L	March 22, 1977	1–3	@ Indianapolis Racers (1976–77)	37–32–3
73	L	March 23, 1977	4–6	Quebec Nordiques (1976–77)	37–33–3
74	L	March 25, 1977	3–4 OT	Edmonton Oilers (1976–77)	37–34–3
75	W	March 26, 1977	6–4	@ Quebec Nordiques (1976–77)	38–34–3
76	L	March 27, 1977	0–4	@ Quebec Nordiques (1976–77)	38–35–3
77	W	March 29, 1977	4–2	@ Birmingham Bulls (1976–77)	39–35–3
78	T	March 30, 1977	5–5	@ Indianapolis Racers (1976–77)	39–35–4

April

Game	Result	Date	Score	Opponent	Record
79	L	April 1, 1977	4–5	@ Houston Aeros (1976–77)	39–36–4
80	L	April 2, 1977	3–6	@ San Diego Mariners (1976–77)	39–37–4
81	T	April 6, 1977	2–2	Quebec Nordiques (1976–77)	39–37–5

Legend: Win (2 points) Loss (0 points) Tie (1 point)

== Playoffs ==
1977 Avco Cup playoffs
Quarterfinals vs. Indianapolis Racers – Racers win 4–0

Game	Date	Visitor	Score	Home	Series
1	April 9	Indianapolis Racers	4–3	Cincinnati Stingers	0–1
2	April 12	Indianapolis Racers	7–2	Cincinnati Stingers	0–2
3	April 14	Cincinnati Stingers	3–5	Indianapolis Racers	0–3
4	April 16	Cincinnati Stingers	1–3	Indianapolis Racers	0–4

Legend: Win Loss

== Draft picks ==
Cincinnati's draft picks at the 1976 WHA Amateur Draft.

Round	#	Player	Nationality	College/Junior/Club team (League)
1	2	Peter Marsh (LW)	Canada	Sherbrooke Castors (QMJHL)
1	7	Randy Carlyle (D)	Canada	Sudbury Wolves (OHA)
2	12	Don Murdoch (RW)	Canada	Medicine Hat Tigers (WCHL)
2	16	Greg Carroll (C)	Canada	Medicine Hat Tigers (WCHL)
4	37	Barry Melrose (D)	Canada	Kamloops Chiefs (WCHL)
6	61	Joe Oslin (D)	United States	University of Vermont (ECAC)
7	73	Paul Skidmore (G)	United States	Boston College (ECAC)
8	85	Stu Ostlund (C)	Canada	Michigan Tech (WCHA)
9	96	Fern LeBlanc (LW)	Canada	Sherbrooke Castors (QMJHL)
10	107	Terry Ballingall (D)	Canada	Flin Flon Bombers (WCHL)

== See also ==
- 1976–77 WHA season
