= 1976–77 Birmingham Bulls season =

World Hockey Association team season

1976–77 Birmingham Bulls
- Division: 5th Eastern
- 1976–77 record: 31–46–4
- Home record: 22–15–3
- Road record: 9–31–1
- Goals for: 289
- Goals against: 309

Team information
- Coach: Gilles Leger
- Arena: Birmingham–Jefferson Convention Complex

Team leaders
- Goals: Mark Napier (60)
- Assists: Dale Hoganson (48)
- Points: Mark Napier (96)
- Penalty minutes: Lou Nistico (166)
- Wins: John Garrett (24)
- Goals against average: John Garrett (3.53)

The 1976–77 Birmingham Bulls season was the Bulls' first season of operation in Birmingham, Alabama after the Toronto Toros relocated from Toronto, Ontario, Canada.

== Regular season ==
=== Final standings ===
Eastern Division
	GP	W	L	T	GF	GA	PTS
Quebec Nordiques	81	47	31	3	353	295	97
Cincinnati Stingers	81	39	37	5	354	303	83
Indianapolis Racers	81	36	37	8	276	305	80
New England Whalers	81	35	40	6	275	290	76
Birmingham Bulls	81	31	46	4	289	309	66
Minnesota Fighting Saints	42	19	18	5	136	129	43

== Schedule and results ==
1976–77 regular season
October

Game	Result	Date	Score	Opponent	Record
1	W	October 8, 1976	4–2	Houston Aeros (1976–77)	1–0–0
2	L	October 10, 1976	3–4 OT	@ Quebec Nordiques (1976–77)	1–1–0
3	W	October 12, 1976	6–2	Calgary Cowboys (1976–77)	2–1–0
4	T	October 14, 1976	7–7	Cincinnati Stingers (1976–77)	2–1–1
5	L	October 16, 1976	0–3	@ Houston Aeros (1976–77)	2–2–1
6	L	October 17, 1976	1–6	@ Minnesota Fighting Saints (1976–77)	2–3–1
7	L	October 19, 1976	5–6 OT	Quebec Nordiques (1976–77)	2–4–1
8	W	October 21, 1976	8–5	Houston Aeros (1976–77)	3–4–1
9	W	October 23, 1976	3–1	@ Indianapolis Racers (1976–77)	4–4–1
12	L	October 28, 1976	3–4 OT	Edmonton Oilers (1976–77)	4–7–1
13	L	October 30, 1976	4–5	@ New England Whalers (1976–77)	4–8–1

November

Game	Result	Date	Score	Opponent	Record
14	L	November 2, 1976	3–4 OT	San Diego Mariners (1976–77)	4–9–1
15	W	November 4, 1976	5–3	Phoenix Roadrunners (1976–77)	5–9–1
16	L	November 6, 1976	5–6	@ Quebec Nordiques (1976–77)	5–10–1
17	L	November 9, 1976	3–4	@ Quebec Nordiques (1976–77)	5–11–1
18	L	November 11, 1976	2–3	San Diego Mariners (1976–77)	5–12–1
19	L	November 13, 1976	2–3	Edmonton Oilers (1976–77)	5–13–1
20	L	November 16, 1976	4–5	New England Whalers (1976–77)	5–14–1
21	L	November 17, 1976	4–6	@ New England Whalers (1976–77)	5–15–1
22	L	November 19, 1976	0–4	@ Indianapolis Racers (1976–77)	5–16–1
23	W	November 21, 1976	4–3	San Diego Mariners (1976–77)	6–16–1
24	W	November 23, 1976	3–1	Calgary Cowboys (1976–77)	7–16–1
25	L	November 25, 1976	3–5	New England Whalers (1976–77)	7–17–1
26	L	November 27, 1976	1–2	@ Cincinnati Stingers (1976–77)	7–18–1
27	L	November 28, 1976	1–3	Minnesota Fighting Saints (1976–77)	7–19–1
28	W	November 30, 1976	3–1	Cincinnati Stingers (1976–77)	8–19–1

December

Game	Result	Date	Score	Opponent	Record
29	L	December 2, 1976	3–4	Edmonton Oilers (1976–77)	8–20–1
30	L	December 7, 1976	2–3 OT	Indianapolis Racers (1976–77)	8–21–1
31	W	December 10, 1976	5–3	@ Winnipeg Jets (1976–77)	9–21–1
32	L	December 12, 1976	3–5	@ Edmonton Oilers (1976–77)	9–22–1
33	L	December 15, 1976	5–6	@ Phoenix Roadrunners (1976–77)	9–23–1
34	W	December 17, 1976	4–3	@ Houston Aeros (1976–77)	10–23–1
35	L	December 18, 1976	2–6	@ New England Whalers (1976–77)	10–24–1
36	L	December 19, 1976	2–3 OT	@ Indianapolis Racers (1976–77)	10–25–1
37	W	December 21, 1976	3–2	Quebec Nordiques (1976–77)	11–25–1
38	W	December 22, 1976	6–2	@ Cincinnati Stingers (1976–77)	12–25–1
39	W	December 26, 1976	6–2	Houston Aeros (1976–77)	13–25–1
40	L	December 30, 1976	2–4	Minnesota Fighting Saints (1976–77)	13–26–1

January

Game	Result	Date	Score	Opponent	Record
41	L	January 2, 1977	1–3	@ Minnesota Fighting Saints (1976–77)	13–27–1
42	W	January 4, 1977	8–5	Phoenix Roadrunners (1976–77)	14–27–1
43	L	January 7, 1977	1–7	@ Cincinnati Stingers (1976–77)	14–28–1
44	L	January 9, 1977	1–4	@ Winnipeg Jets (1976–77)	14–29–1
45	W	January 12, 1977	4–3	@ Minnesota Fighting Saints (1976–77)	15–29–1
46	L	January 14, 1977	3–5	@ Houston Aeros (1976–77)	15–30–1
47	L	January 16, 1977	2–5	@ San Diego Mariners (1976–77)	15–31–1
48	L	January 21, 1977	1–6	@ Houston Aeros (1976–77)	15–32–1
49	W	January 23, 1977	6–2	Indianapolis Racers (1976–77)	16–32–1
50	W	January 27, 1977	3–0	Winnipeg Jets (1976–77)	17–32–1
51	W	January 30, 1977	7–1	Cincinnati Stingers (1976–77)	18–32–1

February

Game	Result	Date	Score	Opponent	Record
52	W	February 1, 1977	4–3	New England Whalers (1976–77)	19–32–1
53	W	February 2, 1977	3–2	@ Cincinnati Stingers (1976–77)	20–32–1
54	W	February 4, 1977	7–0	Quebec Nordiques (1976–77)	21–32–1
55	L	February 5, 1977	2–5	@ Indianapolis Racers (1976–77)	21–33–1
56	L	February 9, 1977	3–4 OT	@ Phoenix Roadrunners (1976–77)	21–34–1
57	L	February 12, 1977	2–3 OT	@ San Diego Mariners (1976–77)	21–35–1
58	W	February 16, 1977	7–2	Phoenix Roadrunners (1976–77)	22–35–1
59	W	February 18, 1977	3–2	@ New England Whalers (1976–77)	23–35–1
60	T	February 20, 1977	2–2	Indianapolis Racers (1976–77)	23–35–2
61	T	February 22, 1977	4–4	Cincinnati Stingers (1976–77)	23–35–3
62	W	February 24, 1977	10–6	Quebec Nordiques (1976–77)	24–35–3
63	L	February 26, 1977	3–5	@ Quebec Nordiques (1976–77)	24–36–3
64	W	February 27, 1977	4–0	@ Edmonton Oilers (1976–77)	25–36–3

March

Game	Result	Date	Score	Opponent	Record
65	L	March 3, 1977	2–4	@ Calgary Cowboys (1976–77)	25–37–3
66	L	March 6, 1977	2–5	@ Edmonton Oilers (1976–77)	25–38–3
67	W	March 9, 1977	4–3 OT	New England Whalers (1976–77)	26–38–3
68	W	March 11, 1977	6–3	New England Whalers (1976–77)	27–38–3
69	L	March 12, 1977	2–7	@ Indianapolis Racers (1976–77)	27–39–3
70	L	March 13, 1977	4–7	@ Cincinnati Stingers (1976–77)	27–40–3
71	W	March 15, 1977	4–2	Cincinnati Stingers (1976–77)	28–40–3
72	L	March 17, 1977	2–5	Indianapolis Racers (1976–77)	28–41–3
73	L	March 20, 1977	3–4 OT	Winnipeg Jets (1976–77)	28–42–3
74	W	March 22, 1977	7–4	Calgary Cowboys (1976–77)	29–42–3
75	W	March 23, 1977	4–0	@ Phoenix Roadrunners (1976–77)	30–42–3
76	L	March 24, 1977	2–6	@ San Diego Mariners (1976–77)	30–43–3
77	W	March 27, 1977	7–3	Indianapolis Racers (1976–77)	31–43–3
78	L	March 29, 1977	2–4	Cincinnati Stingers (1976–77)	31–44–3

April

Game	Result	Date	Score	Opponent	Record
79	L	April 2, 1977	5–6	Winnipeg Jets (1976–77)	31–45–3
80	T	April 5, 1977	4–4	@ Calgary Cowboys (1976–77)	31–45–4
81	L	April 6, 1977	4–6	@ Edmonton Oilers (1976–77)	31–46–4

Legend: Win (2 points) Loss (0 points) Tie (1 point)

== Player statistics ==
Regular season
Scoring

Player	Pos	GP	G	A	Pts	PIM	+/-	PPG	SHG	GWG
Mark Napier	RW	80	60	36	96	24	16	9	1	6
Vaclav Nedomansky	RW	81	36	33	69	10	−13	9	0	3
Peter Marrin	C	79	23	37	60	36	−7	4	1	0
Lou Nistico	C	79	20	36	56	166	−9	1	1	0
Dale Hoganson	D	81	7	48	55	48	1	3	0	0
Paul Henderson	RW	81	23	25	48	30	−9	1	0	0
Jeff Jacques	RW	79	21	27	48	92	−1	1	0	0
Tim Sheehy	RW	50	26	21	47	44	−2	7	0	0
John Stewart	C	52	17	24	41	32	11	2	0	0
Richard Farda	C	48	9	26	35	2	−23	1	0	0
Jim Turkiewicz	D	80	6	25	31	54	5	0	2	0
Gavin Kirk	C	29	9	18	27	34	−6	5	0	0
Jean-Guy Lagace	D	78	2	25	27	110	−8	0	0	0
Frank Mahovlich	LW	17	3	20	23	12	−1	2	0	0
Dave Gorman	RW	52	9	13	22	38	2	0	1	0
Gord Gallant	LW	34	4	13	17	62	8	1	0	0
Tom Simpson	RW	25	7	6	13	10	−12	4	0	0
Pat Westrum	D	34	1	11	12	48	8	0	0	0
Jean-Luc Phaneuf	RW	30	2	7	9	2	−4	0	0	0
Gilles Bilodeau	LW	34	2	6	8	133	1	0	0	0
Rick Cunningham	D	63	0	8	8	75	−18	0	0	0
Terry Ball	D	23	1	6	7	8	2	0	0	0
John Garrett	G	65	0	3	3	21	0	0	0	0
Wayne Carleton	LW	3	1	0	1	0	−2	0	0	0
Ray McKay	D	19	0	1	1	11	−5	0	0	0
Peter Folco	D	2	0	0	0	0	−3	0	0	0
Rich Hart	D	4	0	0	0	0	1	0	0	0
Paul Heaver	D	5	0	0	0	0	0	0	0	0
Keith Kokkola	D	5	0	0	0	21	−3	0	0	0
Jim Marsh	D	1	0	0	0	0	−3	0	0	0
Jerry Rollins	D	8	0	0	0	17	−2	0	0	0
Buzz Schneider	LW	4	0	0	0	2	−2	0	0	0
John Stewart	LW	1	0	0	0	0	0	0	0	0
Dave Syvret	D	8	0	0	0	0	−4	0	0	0
Wayne Wood	G	23	0	0	0	0	0	0	0	0

Goaltending

Player	MIN	GP	W	L	T	GA	GAA	SO
John Garrett	3803	65	24	34	4	224	3.53	4
Wayne Wood	1132	23	7	12	0	78	4.13	0
Team:	4935	81	31	46	4	302	3.67	4

Note: Pos = Position; GP = Games played; G = Goals; A = Assists; Pts = Points; +/- = plus/minus; PIM = Penalty minutes; PPG = Power-play goals; SHG = Short-handed goals; GWG = Game-winning goals
MIN = Minutes played; W = Wins; L = Losses; T = Ties; GA = Goals-against; GAA = Goals-against average; SO = Shutouts;

== Draft picks ==
Birmingham's draft picks (selected while still known as the Toronto Toros) at the 1976 WHA Amateur Draft.

Round	#	Player	Nationality	College/Junior/Club team (League)
1	8	Bjorn Johansson (D)	Sweden	Orebro IK (Sweden D1)
2	11	Kent Nilsson (F)	Sweden	Djurgardens IF (Elitserien)
2	21	Peter Lee (LW)	Canada	Ottawa 67's (OHA)
3	24	Paul Gardner (C)	Canada	Oshawa Generals (OHA)
4	35	Don Lemieux (D)	Canada	Trois-Rivieres Draveurs (QMJHL)
6	59	Dan Djakalovic (F)	Canada	Kitchener Rangers (OHA)
7	71	Mike McEwen (D)	Canada	Toronto Marlboros (OHA)
8	83	Mike Kitchen (D)	Canada	Toronto Marlboros (OHA)
9	94	Marc Desforges (F)	Canada	Chicoutimi Sagueneens (QMJHL)
10	105	Brian Dillon (F)	Canada	Oshawa Generals (OHA)

== See also ==
- 1976–77 WHA season
