= 1976–77 Minnesota Fighting Saints season =

World Hockey Association team season

1976–77 Minnesota Fighting Saints
- Division: 6th Eastern
- 1976–77 record: 19–18–5
- Home record: 14–8–3
- Road record: 5–10–2
- Goals for: 136
- Goals against: 129

Team information
- Coach: Glen Sonmor
- Captain: Ron Ward; John Arbour
- Alternate captains: Bill Butters; Ray Adduono; Johnny McKenzie
- Arena: St. Paul Civic Center

Team leaders
- Goals: Mike Antonovich (27)
- Assists: Dave Keon (38)
- Points: Dave Keon (51)
- Penalty minutes: Bill Butters (133)
- Wins: Jean-Louis Levasseur (15)
- Goals against average: Jean-Louis Levasseur (2.73)

The 1976–77 Minnesota Fighting Saints season was the last season of WHA hockey in Minnesota. The original Fighting Saints disbanded and the Cleveland Crusaders relocated to become the new Minnesota Fighting Saints. The season came to an early end on January 14, 1977, when the Saints played their last game without finishing the season.

== Regular season ==
=== Final standings ===
Eastern Division
	GP	W	L	T	GF	GA	PTS
Quebec Nordiques	81	47	31	3	353	295	97
Cincinnati Stingers	81	39	37	5	354	303	83
Indianapolis Racers	81	36	37	8	276	305	80
New England Whalers	81	35	40	6	275	290	76
Birmingham Bulls	81	31	46	4	289	309	66
Minnesota Fighting Saints	42	19	18	5	136	129	43

== Schedule and results ==
1976–77 regular season
October

Game	Result	Date	Score	Opponent	Record
1	L	October 7, 1976	2–7	@ Cincinnati Stingers (1976–77)	0–1–0
2	L	October 8, 1976	3–4	@ Indianapolis Racers (1976–77)	0–2–0
3	W	October 10, 1976	4–1	Indianapolis Racers (1976–77)	1–2–0
4	L	October 14, 1976	3–4	@ Phoenix Roadrunners (1976–77)	1–3–0
5	L	October 15, 1976	4–7	San Diego Mariners (1976–77)	1–4–0
6	W	October 17, 1976	6–1	Birmingham Bulls (1976–77)	2–4–0
7	L	October 19, 1976	2–4	Cincinnati Stingers (1976–77)	2–5–0
8	T	October 22, 1976	2–2	Calgary Cowboys (1976–77)	2–5–1
9	W	October 26, 1976	3–1	San Diego Mariners (1976–77)	3–5–1
10	T	October 28, 1976	1–1	@ Houston Aeros (1976–77)	3–5–2
11	L	October 30, 1976	1–5	@ Quebec Nordiques (1976–77)	3–6–2

November

Game	Result	Date	Score	Opponent	Record
12	L	November 2, 1976	3–4	@ Calgary Cowboys (1976–77)	3–7–2
13	L	November 3, 1976	2–4	@ Edmonton Oilers (1976–77)	3–8–2
14	L	November 5, 1976	2–9	@ Winnipeg Jets (1976–77)	3–9–2
15	L	November 7, 1976	1–3	Phoenix Roadrunners (1976–77)	3–10–2
16	T	November 11, 1976	3–3	New England Whalers (1976–77)	3–10–3
17	W	November 13, 1976	4–2	@ Quebec Nordiques (1976–77)	4–10–3
18	L	November 18, 1976	5–9	Quebec Nordiques (1976–77)	4–11–3
19	T	November 20, 1976	3–3	@ New England Whalers (1976–77)	4–11–4
20	W	November 21, 1976	5–1	Calgary Cowboys (1976–77)	5–11–4
21	W	November 23, 1976	4–0	Cincinnati Stingers (1976–77)	6–11–4
22	W	November 26, 1976	4–2	Quebec Nordiques (1976–77)	7–11–4
23	W	November 27, 1976	3–1	@ New England Whalers (1976–77)	8–11–4
24	W	November 28, 1976	3–1	@ Birmingham Bulls (1976–77)	9–11–4

December

Game	Result	Date	Score	Opponent	Record
25	L	December 3, 1976	3–4	Winnipeg Jets (1976–77)	9–12–4
26	W	December 5, 1976	5–1	Edmonton Oilers (1976–77)	10–12–4
27	W	December 7, 1976	4–2	New England Whalers (1976–77)	11–12–4
28	W	December 10, 1976	4–2	Calgary Cowboys (1976–77)	12–12–4
29	L	December 12, 1976	2–4	San Diego Mariners (1976–77)	12–13–4
30	L	December 15, 1976	0–5	@ Cincinnati Stingers (1976–77)	12–14–4
31	W	December 16, 1976	5–3	@ Indianapolis Racers (1976–77)	13–14–4
32	W	December 18, 1976	4–3	Cincinnati Stingers (1976–77)	14–14–4
33	L	December 22, 1976	3–4	Quebec Nordiques (1976–77)	14–15–4
34	L	December 23, 1976	1–2	@ Calgary Cowboys (1976–77)	14–16–4
35	L	December 26, 1976	2–3	@ New England Whalers (1976–77)	14–17–4
36	W	December 28, 1976	5–4	New England Whalers (1976–77)	15–17–4
37	W	December 30, 1976	4–2	@ Birmingham Bulls (1976–77)	16–17–4

January

Game	Result	Date	Score	Opponent	Record
38	W	January 2, 1977	3–1	Birmingham Bulls (1976–77)	17–17–4
39	T	January 7, 1977	1–1	Houston Aeros (1976–77)	17–17–5
40	W	January 8, 1977	5–0	Edmonton Oilers (1976–77)	18–17–5
41	L	January 12, 1977	3–4	Birmingham Bulls (1976–77)	18–18–5
42	W	January 14, 1977	9–5	Indianapolis Racers (1976–77)	19–18–5

Legend: Win (2 points) Loss (0 points) Tie (1 point)

== Player statistics ==
Players
Player	Position	GP	G	A	Pts	PIM	+/-	PPG	SHG	GWG
Dave Keon	C	42	13	38	51	2	25	1	1	0
Mike Antonovich	C	42	27	21	48	28	20	6	0	0
Ron Ward	C	41	15	21	36	6	9	4	1	0
John McKenzie	RW	40	17	13	30	52	14	3	0	0
Al McDonough	RW	42	9	21	30	6	13	0	0	0
Ray Adduono	C	40	4	19	23	17	−14	3	0	0
John Arbour	D	33	3	19	22	22	14	0	0	0
Danny Gruen	LW	34	10	9	19	19	7	2	0	0
Craig Patrick	RW	30	6	11	17	6	4	0	0	0
Butch Deadmarsh	LW	35	9	4	13	51	−5	2	0	0
Steve Carlson	C	21	5	8	13	8	3	0	0	0
Jerry Zrymiak	D	40	2	10	12	14	7	0	0	0
Ray McKay	D	42	2	9	11	28	19	0	0	0
Pat Westrum	D	40	1	9	10	42	15	0	0	0
Gord Gallant	LW	37	6	3	9	64	−1	0	0	0
Jack Carlson	LW	36	4	3	7	55	−1	0	0	0
Bill Butters	D	42	0	7	7	133	5	0	0	0
John Stewart	LW	15	3	3	6	2	−6	0	0	0
Dave Hanson	D	7	0	2	2	35	−9	0	0	0
Jean-Louis Levasseur	G	30	0	1	1	2	0	0	0	0
Ray Clearwater	D	2	0	0	0	2	−3	0	0	0
Mike Curran	G	16	0	0	0	6	0	0	0	0
Barry Legge	D	2	0	0	0	0	−1	0	0	0
Tom Milani	RW	2	0	0	0	0	−2	0	0	0

Goaltending
Player	MIN	GP	W	L	T	GA	GAA	SO
Jean-Louis Levasseur	1715	30	15	11	2	78	2.73	2
Mike Curran	848	16	4	7	3	50	3.54	0
Team:	2563	42	19	18	5	128	3.00	2

Note: Pos = Position; GP = Games played; G = Goals; A = Assists; Pts = Points; +/- = plus/minus; PIM = Penalty minutes; PPG = Power-play goals; SHG = Short-handed goals; GWG = Game-winning goals
MIN = Minutes played; W = Wins; L = Losses; T = Ties; GA = Goals-against; GAA = Goals-against average; SO = Shutouts;

== Draft picks ==
Minnesota's draft picks (selected while still known as the Cleveland Crusaders) at the 1976 WHA Amateur Draft.

Round	#	Player	Nationality	College/Junior/Club team (League)
1	3	Glen Sharpley (C)	Canada	Hull Festivals (QMJHL)
2	14	Rod Schutt (LW)	Canada	Sudbury Wolves (OHA)
3	27	Jeff McDill (RW)	Canada	Victoria Cougars (WCHL)
4	39	Rocky Maze (LW)	Canada	Edmonton Oil Kings (WCHL)
5	47	Vern Stenlund (C)	Canada	London Knights (OHA)
5	51	Bob Miller (W)	United States	U.S. National Team
6	63	Rob Flockhart (LW)	Canada	Kamloops Chiefs (WCHL)
7	75	Mark Earp (G)	Canada	Kamloops Chiefs (WCHL)
8	87	Ron Zanussi (F)	Canada	London Knights (OHA)
9	98	Charlie Skjodt (C)	Canada	Windsor Spitfires (OHA)
10	109	Larry McRae (G)	Canada	Windsor Spitfires (OHA)

== See also ==
- 1976–77 WHA season
