= Jim Cole (ice hockey) =

Canadian ice hockey player

- Born: August 13, 1951 (age 74) Indian Head, Saskatchewan, Canada
- Height: 5 ft 8 in (173 cm)
- Weight: 175 lb (79 kg; 12 st 7 lb)
- Position: Left wing
- Shot: Left
- Played for: WHA; Winnipeg Jets
- NHL draft: Undrafted
- Playing career: 1976–1977

James Cole (born August 13, 1951) is a Canadian former professional ice hockey player.

== Sports career ==
During the 1976–77 season, Cole played two games in the World Hockey Association (WHA) with the Winnipeg Jets.

== Career statistics ==
=== Regular season and playoffs ===
			Regular season					Playoffs
Season	Team	League	GP	G	A	Pts	PIM	GP	G	A	Pts	PIM
1976–77	Winnipeg Jets	WHA	2	0	1	1	0	—	—	—	—	—
WHA totals			2	0	1	1	0	—	—	—	—	—
