= Randy Burchell =

Canadian ice hockey player

- Born: July 2, 1955 (age 70) Montreal, Quebec, Canada
- Height: 6 ft 1 in (185 cm)
- Weight: 175 lb (79 kg; 12 st 7 lb)
- Position: Goaltender
- Caught: Left
- Played for: Indianapolis Racers (WHA); Mohawk Valley Comets (NAHL); Tidewater Sharks (SHL)
- NHL draft: Undrafted
- Playing career: 1975–1977

Randy Burchell (born July 2, 1955) is a Canadian former professional ice hockey goaltender.

During the 1976–77 season Burchell played five games in the World Hockey Association (WHA) with the Indianapolis Racers.

== Career statistics ==
=== Regular season and playoffs ===
			Regular season									Playoffs
Season	Team	League	GP	W	L	T	MIN	GA	SO	GAA	SV%	GP	W	L	MIN	GA	SO	GAA	SV%
1974–75	Chateaugenay Cougars	QJHLB	0
1975–76	Tidewater Sharks	SHL	1	0	1	0	60	5	0	5.00	.839	—	—	—	—	—	—	—	—
1975–76	Mohawk Valley Comets	NAHL	18	4	13	0	960	95	0	5.94	—	1	—	—	15	1	0	3.94	—
1976–77	Indianapolis Racers	WHA	5	1	0	0	136	8	0	3.53	.910	—	—	—	—	—	—	—	—
1976–77	Mohawk Valley Comets	NAHL	8	4	4	0	472	37	0	4.71	.874	—	—	—	—	—	—	—	—
WHA totals			5	1	0	0	136	8	0	3.53	.910	—	—	—	—	—	—	—	—
