= 1976–77 Quebec Nordiques season =

World Hockey Association team season

1976–77 Quebec Nordiques
- Avco Cup champions
- Eastern Division champions
- Division: 1st Eastern
- 1976–77 record: 47–31–3
- Home record: 29–10–1
- Road record: 18–21–2
- Goals for: 353
- Goals against: 295

Team information
- General manager: Maurice Filion
- Coach: Marc Boileau
- Captain: Marc Tardif
- Alternate captains: Serge Bernier; Jim Dorey
- Arena: Colisée de Québec

Team leaders
- Goals: Real Cloutier (66)
- Assists: Real Cloutier & Christian Bordeleau (75)
- Points: Real Cloutier (141)
- Penalty minutes: Paul Baxter (244)
- Plus/minus: Real Cloutier (+47)
- Wins: Richard Brodeur (29)
- Goals against average: Richard Brodeur (3.45)

The 1976–77 Quebec Nordiques season was the Nordiques fifth season, as they were coming off their best season to date in 1975–76, earning a team record 50 victories and 104 points, as they finished in second place in the Canadian Division. In the post-season, Quebec win their first Avco Cup in team history. Serge Bernier would win the WHA Playoff MVP trophy, as he earned 36 points for the Nordiques in 17 post-season games.

== Offseason ==
During the off-season, the league saw the Toronto Toros move to Birmingham, Alabama, and be renamed the Birmingham Bulls, while the Cleveland Crusaders moved to Minneapolis, Minnesota to become the second version of the Minnesota Fighting Saints. The league was back to twelve teams from fourteen the previous season, as the original Fighting Saints and Denver Spurs/Ottawa Civics franchise folded midway through the 1975–76 season. The Nordiques would move from the Canadian Division to the Eastern Division, joining the Birmingham Bulls, Cincinnati Stingers, Indianapolis Racers, Minnesota Fighting Saints and New England Whalers in the division.

The Nordiques also made a head coaching change after their disappointing playoff appearance, as head coach Jean-Guy Gendron was relieved of his duties, and former Pittsburgh Penguins head coach Marc Boileau was his replacement.

== Regular season ==
Quebec would have a very strong start to the season, winning eight of their first nine games to take a lead in the Eastern Division. The Nordiques would cool off, as they had a record of 8–11–1 in their next twenty games, however, Quebec snapped out of their slump and won nine games in a row to take control of the Division. The Nordiques would finish the season on top of the Eastern Division with a 47–31–3 record, earning 97 points, which was fourteen points higher than the second place Cincinnati Stingers.

Offensively, Quebec was led by Real Cloutier, who won the Bill Hunter Trophy awarded to the player who leads the league in scoring. Cloutier scored 66 goals and 75 assists for a league best 141 points. Marc Tardif scored 49 goals and 109 points despite missing 19 games, while Christian Bordeleau 32 goals and tied Cloutier with a team high 75 assists to earn 107 points for the season. Serge Bernier narrowly missed out on the 100 point club, as he scored 43 goals and 96 points in 74 games. On defence, newly acquired Jim Dorey led the blueline with 47 points in 73 games, while J. C. Tremblay had another productive season, earning 35 points in 53 games. Paul Baxter had a team high 244 penalty minutes, which was the second highest total in the league.

In goal, Richard Brodeur had the majority of playing time, winning 29 games, while posting a team best 3.45 GAA, along with 2 shutouts. Ed Humphreys and Serge Aubry split the backup duties, with Humphreys winning twelve games and a 3.58 GAA, while Aubry won six games with a 3.98 GAA.

=== Season standings ===
Eastern Division
| | GP | W | L | T | GF | GA | PTS |
|---|---|---|---|---|---|---|---|
| Quebec Nordiques | 81 | 47 | 31 | 3 | 353 | 295 | 97 |
| Cincinnati Stingers | 81 | 39 | 37 | 5 | 354 | 303 | 83 |
| Indianapolis Racers | 81 | 36 | 37 | 8 | 276 | 305 | 80 |
| New England Whalers | 81 | 35 | 40 | 6 | 275 | 290 | 76 |
| Birmingham Bulls | 81 | 31 | 46 | 4 | 289 | 309 | 66 |
| Minnesota Fighting Saints | 42 | 19 | 18 | 5 | 136 | 129 | 43 |

== Schedule and results ==
1976–77 regular season
October

| Game | Date | Visitor | Score | Home | Record | Points |
|---|---|---|---|---|---|---|
| 1 | October 9 | Calgary Cowboys | 2–5 | Quebec Nordiques | 1–0–0 | 2 |
| 2 | October 10 | Birmingham Bulls | 3–4 | Quebec Nordiques | 2–0–0 | 4 |
| 3 | October 12 | San Diego Mariners | 4–6 | Quebec Nordiques | 3–0–0 | 6 |
| 4 | October 16 | Quebec Nordiques | 8–2 | New England Whalers | 4–0–0 | 8 |
| 5 | October 17 | Cincinnati Stingers | 5–2 | Quebec Nordiques | 4–1–0 | 8 |
| 6 | October 19 | Quebec Nordiques | 6–5 | Birmingham Bulls | 5–1–0 | 10 |
| 7 | October 21 | Quebec Nordiques | 4–2 | Calgary Cowboys | 6–1–0 | 12 |
| 8 | October 23 | Houston Aeros | 2–6 | Quebec Nordiques | 7–1–0 | 14 |
| 9 | October 26 | Phoenix Roadrunners | 3–11 | Quebec Nordiques | 8–1–0 | 16 |
| 10 | October 29 | Quebec Nordiques | 4–6 | Indianapolis Racers | 8–2–0 | 16 |
| 11 | October 30 | Minnesota Fighting Saints | 1–5 | Quebec Nordiques | 9–2–0 | 18 |

November

| Game | Date | Visitor | Score | Home | Record | Points |
|---|---|---|---|---|---|---|
| 12 | November 2 | Phoenix Roadrunners | 5–3 | Quebec Nordiques | 9–3–0 | 18 |
| 13 | November 6 | Birmingham Bulls | 5–6 | Quebec Nordiques | 10–3–0 | 20 |
| 14 | November 9 | Birmingham Bulls | 3–4 | Quebec Nordiques | 11–3–0 | 22 |
| 15 | November 13 | Minnesota Fighting Saints | 4–2 | Quebec Nordiques | 11–4–0 | 22 |
| 16 | November 14 | Indianapolis Racers | 3–1 | Quebec Nordiques | 11–5–0 | 22 |
| 17 | November 16 | Quebec Nordiques | 4–8 | Winnipeg Jets | 11–6–0 | 22 |
| 18 | November 18 | Quebec Nordiques | 9–5 | Minnesota Fighting Saints | 12–6–0 | 24 |
| 19 | November 19 | Quebec Nordiques | 1–4 | Calgary Cowboys | 12–7–0 | 24 |
| 20 | November 21 | Quebec Nordiques | 5–8 | Edmonton Oilers | 12–8–0 | 24 |
| 21 | November 23 | Winnipeg Jets | 4–7 | Quebec Nordiques | 13–8–0 | 26 |
| 22 | November 25 | Quebec Nordiques | 5–0 | Indianapolis Racers | 14–8–0 | 28 |
| 23 | November 26 | Quebec Nordiques | 2–4 | Minnesota Fighting Saints | 14–9–0 | 28 |
| 24 | November 27 | Indianapolis Racers | 8–2 | Quebec Nordiques | 14–10–0 | 28 |
| 25 | November 30 | New England Whalers | 1–2 | Quebec Nordiques | 15–10–0 | 30 |

December

| Game | Date | Visitor | Score | Home | Record | Points |
|---|---|---|---|---|---|---|
| 26 | December 3 | Quebec Nordiques | 5–5 | New England Whalers | 15–10–1 | 31 |
| 27 | December 5 | Winnipeg Jets | 4–6 | Quebec Nordiques | 16–10–1 | 33 |
| 28 | December 7 | Edmonton Oilers | 4–2 | Quebec Nordiques | 16–11–1 | 33 |
| 29 | December 9 | Quebec Nordiques | 5–4 | Phoenix Roadrunners | 17–11–1 | 35 |
| 30 | December 11 | Houston Aeros | 1–4 | Quebec Nordiques | 18–11–1 | 37 |
| 31 | December 12 | New England Whalers | 1–5 | Quebec Nordiques | 19–11–1 | 39 |
| 32 | December 14 | New England Whalers | 3–1 | Quebec Nordiques | 19–12–1 | 39 |
| 33 | December 18 | Quebec Nordiques | 2–4 | Calgary Cowboys | 19–13–1 | 39 |
| 34 | December 19 | Quebec Nordiques | 3–5 | San Diego Mariners | 19–14–1 | 39 |
| 35 | December 21 | Quebec Nordiques | 2–3 | Birmingham Bulls | 19–15–1 | 39 |
| 36 | December 22 | Quebec Nordiques | 4–3 | Minnesota Fighting Saints | 20–15–1 | 41 |
| 37 | December 26 | Quebec Nordiques | 12–3 | Winnipeg Jets | 21–15–1 | 43 |
| 38 | December 28 | Quebec Nordiques | 3–2 | Edmonton Oilers | 22–15–1 | 45 |

January

| Game | Date | Visitor | Score | Home | Record | Points |
|---|---|---|---|---|---|---|
| 39 | January 4 | New England Whalers | 3–5 | Quebec Nordiques | 23–15–1 | 47 |
| 40 | January 7 | Quebec Nordiques | 7–3 | New England Whalers | 24–15–1 | 49 |
| 41 | January 9 | San Diego Mariners | 2–5 | Quebec Nordiques | 25–15–1 | 51 |
| 42 | January 20 | Quebec Nordiques | 5–4 | New England Whalers | 26–15–1 | 53 |
| 43 | January 22 | Calgary Cowboys | 3–5 | Quebec Nordiques | 27–15–1 | 55 |
| 44 | January 25 | Indianapolis Racers | 1–3 | Quebec Nordiques | 28–15–1 | 57 |
| 45 | January 26 | Edmonton Oilers | 5–4 | Quebec Nordiques | 28–16–1 | 57 |
| 46 | January 28 | Quebec Nordiques | 6–5 | Indianapolis Racers | 29–16–1 | 59 |
| 47 | January 29 | Cincinnati Stingers | 2–7 | Quebec Nordiques | 30–16–1 | 61 |

February

| Game | Date | Visitor | Score | Home | Record | Points |
|---|---|---|---|---|---|---|
| 48 | February 1 | Indianapolis Racers | 4–5 | Quebec Nordiques | 31–16–1 | 63 |
| 49 | February 2 | Quebec Nordiques | 5–6 | Indianapolis Racers | 31–17–1 | 63 |
| 50 | February 4 | Quebec Nordiques | 0–7 | Birmingham Bulls | 31–18–1 | 63 |
| 51 | February 6 | Cincinnati Stingers | 1–6 | Quebec Nordiques | 32–18–1 | 65 |
| 52 | February 8 | Winnipeg Jets | 7–2 | Quebec Nordiques | 32–19–1 | 65 |
| 53 | February 11 | Quebec Nordiques | 5–1 | Indianapolis Racers | 33–19–1 | 67 |
| 54 | February 12 | Quebec Nordiques | 3–7 | Houston Aeros | 33–20–1 | 67 |
| 55 | February 15 | Quebec Nordiques | 2–4 | Houston Aeros | 33–21–1 | 67 |
| 56 | February 16 | Quebec Nordiques | 4–2 | San Diego Mariners | 34–21–1 | 69 |
| 57 | February 19 | Quebec Nordiques | 1–3 | Cincinnati Stingers | 34–22–1 | 69 |
| 58 | February 22 | Indianapolis Racers | 2–4 | Quebec Nordiques | 35–22–1 | 71 |
| 59 | February 24 | Quebec Nordiques | 6–10 | Birmingham Bulls | 35–23–1 | 71 |
| 60 | February 25 | Quebec Nordiques | 2–5 | Cincinnati Stingers | 35–24–1 | 71 |
| 61 | February 26 | Birmingham Bulls | 3–5 | Quebec Nordiques | 36–24–1 | 73 |

March

| Game | Date | Visitor | Score | Home | Record | Points |
|---|---|---|---|---|---|---|
| 62 | March 1 | Quebec Nordiques | 5–4 | Edmonton Oilers | 37–24–1 | 75 |
| 63 | March 2 | Quebec Nordiques | 3–4 | Winnipeg Jets | 37–25–1 | 75 |
| 64 | March 5 | San Diego Mariners | 0–6 | Quebec Nordiques | 38–25–1 | 77 |
| 65 | March 6 | Quebec Nordiques | 2–6 | New England Whalers | 38–26–1 | 77 |
| 66 | March 8 | Phoenix Roadrunners | 2–9 | Quebec Nordiques | 39–26–1 | 79 |
| 67 | March 12 | Edmonton Oilers | 3–3 | Quebec Nordiques | 39–26–2 | 80 |
| 68 | March 13 | New England Whalers | 3–5 | Quebec Nordiques | 40–26–2 | 82 |
| 69 | March 15 | Quebec Nordiques | 3–4 | Houston Aeros | 40–27–2 | 82 |
| 70 | March 17 | Quebec Nordiques | 4–3 | Phoenix Roadrunners | 41–27–2 | 84 |
| 71 | March 18 | Quebec Nordiques | 3–7 | Cincinnati Stingers | 41–28–2 | 84 |
| 72 | March 19 | Calgary Cowboys | 0–8 | Quebec Nordiques | 42–28–2 | 86 |
| 73 | March 22 | Houston Aeros | 2–6 | Quebec Nordiques | 43–28–2 | 88 |
| 74 | March 23 | Quebec Nordiques | 6–4 | Cincinnati Stingers | 44–28–2 | 90 |
| 75 | March 24 | Quebec Nordiques | 3–4 | Indianapolis Racers | 44–29–2 | 90 |
| 76 | March 26 | Cincinnati Stingers | 6–4 | Quebec Nordiques | 44–30–2 | 90 |
| 77 | March 27 | Cincinnati Stingers | 0–4 | Quebec Nordiques | 45–30–2 | 92 |

April

| Game | Date | Visitor | Score | Home | Record | Points |
|---|---|---|---|---|---|---|
| 78 | April 2 | Quebec Nordiques | 6–5 | Phoenix Roadrunners | 46–30–2 | 94 |
| 79 | April 3 | Quebec Nordiques | 0–7 | San Diego Mariners | 46–31–2 | 94 |
| 80 | April 5 | New England Whalers | 2–7 | Quebec Nordiques | 47–31–2 | 96 |
| 81 | April 6 | Quebec Nordiques | 2–2 | Cincinnati Stingers | 47–31–3 | 97 |

Legend: Win (2 points) Loss (0 points) Tie (1 point)

== Playoffs ==
In the opening round of the playoffs, Quebec would face the New England Whalers in a best of seven series. The Whalers finished the year with a record of 35–40–6, earning 76 points, which was 21 fewer than the Nordiques. The series opened with two games at Le Colisée, with Quebec winning them both, by scores of 5–2 and 7–3, to take the series lead. The series moved over to New England for the next two games, however, Quebec stayed hot and defeated the Whalers 4–3 in overtime in the third game to take a 3–0 lead in the series. New England fought off elimination in the fourth game, defeating the Nordiques 6–4, however, in the fifth game played back in Quebec, the Nordiques shutout New England 3–0 to win the series.

In the Eastern Division finals, the Nordiques faced off against the Indianapolis Racers, who finished the regular season in third place in the Eastern Division with a 36–37–8 record. The Racers swept the second place Cincinnati Stingers in the opening round to advance to the division finals. The series opened with two games in Quebec, and the Nordiques stayed unbeaten on home ice during the post-season, as they defeated Indianapolis 3–1 and 8–3 to take the early series lead. The series shifted over to Indianapolis for the next two games, but the Nordiques won the third game, defeating the Racers 6–5 in overtime to put them on the brink of elimination. Indianapolis finally managed to win a game in the fourth game of the series, shutting out the Nordiques 2–0, however, with the series back in Quebec for the fifth game, the Nordiques remained hot on home ice, easily winning the game 8–3, and advancing to the Avco Cup finals.

The Nordiques opponents in the Avco Cup finals was the Winnipeg Jets. Winnipeg was the defending champions, as they won the 1976 Avco Cup. The Jets had a record of 46–32–2, finishing with 94 points, and in second place in the Western Division. Winnipeg defeated the Edmonton Oilers and Houston Aeros to earn a spot in the finals. The series opened with two games in Quebec, and the Jets ended the Nordiques home ice winning streak with a 2–1 victory in the first game. Quebec evened the series with a 6–1 thumping in the second game. The series moved to Winnipeg for the next two games, and the Jets used their home ice to their advantage, as they took the third game by a 6–1 score, however, the Nordiques would once again even the series up, defeating Winnipeg 4–2 in the fourth game. The series was back in Quebec for the fifth game, and the Nordiques destroyed the Jets 8–3 to take their first lead in the series, and were now only one win away from the championship. The Jets responded in the sixth game played back in Winnipeg, crushing the Nordiques 12–3, to set up a seventh and deciding game in Quebec. The Nordiques would take control of the seventh game early, coasting their way to an 8–2 victory, and winning their first Avco Cup in team history. Serge Bernier would win the WHA Playoff MVP trophy, as he earned 36 points for the Nordiques in 17 post-season games.

1977 Avco Cup playoffs
Quarterfinals vs. (E4) New England Whalers – Nordiques win 4–1

| Game | Date | Visitor | Score | Home | Series |
|---|---|---|---|---|---|
| 1 | April 9 | New England Whalers | 2–5 | Quebec Nordiques | 1–0 |
| 2 | April 12 | New England Whalers | 3–7 | Quebec Nordiques | 2–0 |
| 3 | April 14 | Quebec Nordiques | 4–3 | New England Whalers | 3–0 |
| 4 | April 16 | Quebec Nordiques | 4–6 | New England Whalers | 3–1 |
| 5 | April 19 | New England Whalers | 0–3 | Quebec Nordiques | 4–1 |

Semifinals vs. (E3) Indianapolis Racers – Nordiques win 4–1

| Game | Date | Visitor | Score | Home | Series |
|---|---|---|---|---|---|
| 1 | April 23 | Indianapolis Racers | 1–3 | Quebec Nordiques | 1–0 |
| 2 | April 25 | Indianapolis Racers | 3–8 | Quebec Nordiques | 2–0 |
| 3 | April 28 | Quebec Nordiques | 6–5 | Indianapolis Racers | 3–0 |
| 4 | April 30 | Quebec Nordiques | 0–2 | Indianapolis Racers | 3–1 |
| 5 | May 2 | Indianapolis Racers | 3–8 | Quebec Nordiques | 4–1 |

Avco Cup Finals vs. (W2) Winnipeg Jets – Nordiques win 4–3

| Game | Date | Visitor | Score | Home | Series |
|---|---|---|---|---|---|
| 1 | May 11 | Winnipeg Jets | 2–1 | Quebec Nordiques | 0–1 |
| 2 | May 15 | Winnipeg Jets | 1–6 | Quebec Nordiques | 1–1 |
| 3 | May 18 | Quebec Nordiques | 1–6 | Winnipeg Jets | 1–2 |
| 4 | May 20 | Quebec Nordiques | 4–2 | Winnipeg Jets | 2–2 |
| 5 | May 22 | Winnipeg Jets | 3–8 | Quebec Nordiques | 3–2 |
| 6 | May 24 | Quebec Nordiques | 3–12 | Winnipeg Jets | 3–3 |
| 7 | May 26 | Winnipeg Jets | 2–8 | Quebec Nordiques | 4–3 |

Legend: Win Loss

== Season stats ==
Scoring

Regular season
| Player | Pos | GP | G | A | Pts | PIM | +/- | PPG |
|---|---|---|---|---|---|---|---|---|
| Réal Cloutier | RW | 76 | 66 | 75 | 141 | 47 | 39 | 25 |
| Marc Tardif | LW | 62 | 49 | 60 | 109 | 29 | 65 | 10 |
| Christian Bordeleau | C | 72 | 32 | 75 | 107 | 28 | 34 | 6 |
| Serge Bernier | C | 74 | 43 | 53 | 96 | 1 | 94 | 11 |
| Paulin Bordeleau | RW | 80 | 42 | 41 | 83 | 7 | 52 | 8 |
| Jim Dorey | D | 73 | 13 | 34 | 47 | 26 | 102 | 1 |
| André Boudrias | C | 74 | 12 | 31 | 43 | 3 | 12 | 1 |
| Bob Fitchner | C | 81 | 9 | 30 | 39 | 1 | 105 | 1 |
| J.C. Tremblay | D | 53 | 4 | 31 | 35 | 2 | 16 | 2 |
| Charles Constantin | LW | 77 | 14 | 19 | 33 | 1 | 93 | 1 |
| Norm Dubé | LW | 39 | 15 | 18 | 33 | 11 | 8 | 1 |
| Curt Brackenbury | RW | 77 | 16 | 13 | 29 | 2 | 146 | 0 |
| François Lacombe | D | 81 | 5 | 22 | 27 | 17 | 86 | 0 |
| Paul Baxter | D | 66 | 6 | 17 | 23 | 14 | 244 | 0 |
| Richard Grenier | C | 34 | 11 | 9 | 20 | -6 | 4 | 2 |
| Wally Weir | D | 69 | 3 | 17 | 20 | 13 | 197 | 0 |
| Steve Sutherland | LW | 36 | 6 | 9 | 15 | 6 | 34 | 0 |
| Jean Bernier | D | 72 | 2 | 13 | 15 | 2 | 23 | 1 |
| Pierre Guite | LW | 35 | 2 | 6 | 8 | -3 | 67 | 0 |
| Pierre Roy | D | 29 | 3 | 5 | 8 | 10 | 50 | 0 |
| Garry Lariviere | D | 15 | 0 | 3 | 3 | 7 | 8 | 0 |
| Ed Humphreys | G | 22 | 0 | 1 | 1 | 0 | 0 | 0 |
| Richard Brodeur | G | 53 | 0 | 1 | 1 | 0 | 0 | 0 |
| Serge Aubry | G | 21 | 0 | 1 | 1 | 0 | 0 | 0 |
| Michel Dubois | D | 4 | 0 | 0 | 0 | 0 | 0 | 0 |

=== Goaltending ===
Regular Season
| Player | GP | MIN | W | L | T | GA | SO | GAA | SV% |
|---|---|---|---|---|---|---|---|---|---|
| Richard Brodeur | 53 | 2,906 | 29 | 18 | 2 | 167 | 2 | 3.45 | .880 |
| Ed Humphreys | 22 | 1,240 | 12 | 8 | 1 | 74 | 1 | 3.58 | .880 |
| Serge Aubry | 21 | 769 | 6 | 5 | 0 | 51 | 1 | 3.98 | .862 |

== Playoff stats ==
=== Scoring leaders ===
| Player | GP | G | A | Pts | PIM |
|---|---|---|---|---|---|
| Serge Bernier | 17 | 14 | 22 | 36 | 10 |
| Real Cloutier | 17 | 14 | 13 | 27 | 10 |
| Paulin Bordeleau | 16 | 12 | 9 | 21 | 12 |
| Norm Dube | 14 | 3 | 12 | 15 | 11 |
| Andre Boudrias | 17 | 3 | 12 | 15 | 6 |

=== Goaltending ===
| Player | GP | TOI | W | L | GA | SO | GAA | Save % |
| Serge Aubry | 3 | 18 | 0 | 0 | 0 | 0 | 0.00 | 1.000 |
| Richard Brodeur | 17 | 1007 | 12 | 5 | 55 | 1 | 3.28 | .882 |

== Draft picks ==
Quebec's draft picks at the 1976 WHA Amateur Draft.

| Round | # | Player | Nationality | College/Junior/Club team (League) |
|---|---|---|---|---|
| 1 | 10 | Rick Green | Canada | London Knights (OMJHL) |
| 2 | 19 | Bob Manno | Canada | St. Catharines Black Hawks (OMJHL) |
| 3 | 32 | Al Glendinning | Canada | Calgary Centennials (WCHL) |
| 4 | 44 | Maurice Barrette | Canada | Quebec Remparts (QMJHL) |
| 5 | 56 | Garth MacGuigan | Canada | Montreal Juniors (QMJHL) |
| 6 | 68 | Claude Periard | Canada | Trois-Rivières Draveurs (QMJHL) |
| 7 | 80 | Denis Charbonneau | Canada | Laval National (QMJHL) |
| 10 | 114 | Pierre Brassard | Canada | Cornwall Royals (QMJHL) |
