= 1972–73 Philadelphia Blazers season =

World Hockey Association team season

1972–73 Philadelphia Blazers
- Division: 3rd Eastern
- 1972–73 record: 38–40–0 (76 pts)
- Home record: 24–15–0
- Road record: 14–25–0
- Goals for: 288
- Goals against: 305

Team information
- General manager: Dave Creighton; Phil Watson
- Coach: John McKenzie; Phil Watson
- Captain: Derek Sanderson; Andre Lacroix
- Alternate captains: Bryan Campbell (unconfirmed); Jim Cardiff (unconfirmed); Andre Lacroix; Derek Sanderson
- Arena: Civic Center

Team leaders
- Goals: Danny Lawson (61)
- Assists: Andre Lacroix (74)
- Points: Andre Lacroix (124)
- Penalty minutes: Jim Cardiff (185)
- Wins: Bernie Parent (33)
- Goals against average: Bernie Parent (3.61)

The 1972–73 Philadelphia Blazers season was the first season of the Blazers' franchise in the World Hockey Association. It would also be the only season of the Blazers in Philadelphia, as the team relocated to Vancouver for the following season. The Blazers finished third and qualified for the playoffs losing in the first round to the Cleveland Crusaders.

== Regular season ==
=== Final standings ===
Eastern Division
| | GP | W | L | T | GF | GA | PIM | Pts |
|---|---|---|---|---|---|---|---|---|
| New England Whalers | 78 | 46 | 30 | 2 | 318 | 263 | 858 | 94 |
| Cleveland Crusaders | 78 | 43 | 32 | 3 | 287 | 239 | 1095 | 89 |
| Philadelphia Blazers | 78 | 38 | 40 | 0 | 288 | 305 | 1260 | 76 |
| Ottawa Nationals | 78 | 35 | 39 | 4 | 279 | 301 | 1067 | 74 |
| Quebec Nordiques | 78 | 33 | 40 | 5 | 276 | 313 | 1354 | 71 |
| New York Raiders | 78 | 33 | 43 | 2 | 303 | 334 | 900 | 68 |

== Schedule and results ==
1972–73 regular season
October

| Game | Result | Date | Score | Opponent | Record |
|---|---|---|---|---|---|
| 1 | L | October 12, 1972 | 3–4 | @ New England Whalers (1972–73) | 0–1–0 |
| 2 | L | October 15, 1972 | 0–5 | @ New York Raiders (1972–73) | 0–2–0 |
| 3 | L | October 19, 1972 | 2–4 | @ Los Angeles Sharks (1972–73) | 0–3–0 |
| 4 | L | October 20, 1972 | 1–4 | @ Alberta Oilers (1972–73) | 0–4–0 |
| 5 | L | October 22, 1972 | 3–6 | @ Winnipeg Jets (1972–73) | 0–5–0 |
| 6 | L | October 24, 1972 | 3–5 | @ Winnipeg Jets (1972–73) | 0–6–0 |
| 7 | L | October 25, 1972 | 2–8 | Cleveland Crusaders (1972–73) | 0–7–0 |
| 8 | W | October 27, 1972 | 5–4 | Los Angeles Sharks (1972–73) | 1–7–0 |
| 9 | L | October 28, 1972 | 3–5 | Ottawa Nationals (1972–73) | 1–8–0 |

November

| Game | Result | Date | Score | Opponent | Record |
|---|---|---|---|---|---|
| 10 | W | November 1, 1972 | 7–5 | @ Cleveland Crusaders (1972–73) | 2–8–0 |
| 11 | L | November 2, 1972 | 3–6 | @ Quebec Nordiques (1972–73) | 2–9–0 |
| 12 | L | November 4, 1972 | 4–8 | @ New England Whalers (1972–73) | 2–10–0 |
| 13 | L | November 5, 1972 | 1–3 | @ Minnesota Fighting Saints (1972–73) | 2–11–0 |
| 14 | L | November 12, 1972 | 1–2 | @ Ottawa Nationals (1972–73) | 2–12–0 |
| 15 | W | November 14, 1972 | 4–3 | @ Chicago Cougars (1972–73) | 3–12–0 |
| 16 | L | November 18, 1972 | 4–5 OT | Minnesota Fighting Saints (1972–73) | 3–13–0 |
| 17 | L | November 19, 1972 | 0–5 | @ New York Raiders (1972–73) | 3–14–0 |
| 18 | W | November 22, 1972 | 5–4 OT | Alberta Oilers (1972–73) | 4–14–0 |
| 19 | L | November 24, 1972 | 4–6 | Minnesota Fighting Saints (1972–73) | 4–15–0 |
| 20 | L | November 25, 1972 | 3–4 | Chicago Cougars (1972–73) | 4–16–0 |
| 21 | W | November 28, 1972 | 4–3 | Los Angeles Sharks (1972–73) | 5–16–0 |

December

| Game | Result | Date | Score | Opponent | Record |
|---|---|---|---|---|---|
| 22 | W | December 1, 1972 | 5–3 | New England Whalers (1972–73) | 6–16–0 |
| 23 | L | December 2, 1972 | 2–8 | @ Cleveland Crusaders (1972–73) | 6–17–0 |
| 24 | L | December 5, 1972 | 3–4 OT | Cleveland Crusaders (1972–73) | 6–18–0 |
| 25 | W | December 8, 1972 | 3–1 | New York Raiders (1972–73) | 7–18–0 |
| 26 | W | December 9, 1972 | 7–1 | Ottawa Nationals (1972–73) | 8–18–0 |
| 27 | L | December 12, 1972 | 2–5 | @ Quebec Nordiques (1972–73) | 8–19–0 |
| 28 | W | December 13, 1972 | 7–4 | Winnipeg Jets (1972–73) | 9–19–0 |
| 29 | W | December 15, 1972 | 6–4 | Winnipeg Jets (1972–73) | 10–19–0 |
| 30 | L | December 16, 1972 | 6–10 | New England Whalers (1972–73) | 10–20–0 |
| 31 | W | December 17, 1972 | 6–3 | @ New England Whalers (1972–73) | 11–20–0 |
| 32 | L | December 19, 1972 | 2–7 | New York Raiders (1972–73) | 11–21–0 |
| 33 | W | December 20, 1972 | 8–5 | Chicago Cougars (1972–73) | 12–21–0 |
| 34 | L | December 23, 1972 | 3–7 | @ Houston Aeros (1972–73) | 12–22–0 |
| 35 | L | December 25, 1972 | 0–8 | @ Cleveland Crusaders (1972–73) | 12–23–0 |
| 36 | W | December 26, 1972 | 6–2 | @ Minnesota Fighting Saints (1972–73) | 13–23–0 |
| 37 | L | December 28, 1972 | 3–6 | @ Chicago Cougars (1972–73) | 13–24–0 |
| 38 | W | December 31, 1972 | 3–1 | @ Los Angeles Sharks (1972–73) | 14–24–0 |

January

| Game | Result | Date | Score | Opponent | Record |
|---|---|---|---|---|---|
| 39 | W | January 1, 1973 | 3–0 | @ New York Raiders (1972–73) | 15–24–0 |
| 40 | L | January 10, 1973 | 1–4 | New York Raiders (1972–73) | 15–25–0 |
| 41 | W | January 12, 1973 | 4–3 | Ottawa Nationals (1972–73) | 16–25–0 |
| 42 | W | January 13, 1973 | 9–4 | Quebec Nordiques (1972–73) | 17–25–0 |
| 43 | L | January 16, 1973 | 3–4 | Cleveland Crusaders (1972–73) | 17–26–0 |
| 44 | W | January 19, 1973 | 4–2 | Ottawa Nationals (1972–73) | 18–26–0 |
| 45 | L | January 20, 1973 | 3–4 | Houston Aeros (1972–73) | 18–27–0 |
| 46 | W | January 24, 1973 | 6–4 | @ Quebec Nordiques (1972–73) | 19–27–0 |
| 47 | W | January 25, 1973 | 7–4 | @ Cleveland Crusaders (1972–73) | 20–27–0 |
| 48 | W | January 27, 1973 | 1–0 OT | @ Alberta Oilers (1972–73) | 21–27–0 |
| 49 | L | January 28, 1973 | 2–4 | @ Alberta Oilers (1972–73) | 21–28–0 |
| 50 | W | January 30, 1973 | 5–4 OT | @ Ottawa Nationals (1972–73) | 22–28–0 |

February

| Game | Result | Date | Score | Opponent | Record |
|---|---|---|---|---|---|
| 51 | L | February 2, 1973 | 3–5 | @ Cleveland Crusaders (1972–73) | 22–29–0 |
| 52 | L | February 6, 1973 | 3–5 | @ Ottawa Nationals (1972–73) | 22–30–0 |
| 53 | L | February 7, 1973 | 0–3 | @ Quebec Nordiques (1972–73) | 22–31–0 |
| 54 | W | February 10, 1973 | 5–4 OT | Quebec Nordiques (1972–73) | 23–31–0 |
| 55 | W | February 11, 1973 | 6–1 | Cleveland Crusaders (1972–73) | 24–31–0 |
| 56 | W | February 13, 1973 | 5–4 | New England Whalers (1972–73) | 25–31–0 |
| 57 | W | February 14, 1973 | 6–5 | Cleveland Crusaders (1972–73) | 26–31–0 |
| 58 | W | February 16, 1973 | 9–2 | New York Raiders (1972–73) | 27–31–0 |
| 59 | L | February 18, 1973 | 1–4 | Los Angeles Sharks (1972–73) | 27–32–0 |
| 60 | W | February 20, 1973 | 4–2 | New England Whalers (1972–73) | 28–32–0 |
| 61 | W | February 22, 1973 | 6–5 | @ Ottawa Nationals (1972–73) | 29–32–0 |
| 62 | L | February 25, 1973 | 3–5 | @ Winnipeg Jets (1972–73) | 29–33–0 |
| 63 | L | February 27, 1973 | 0–3 | @ Minnesota Fighting Saints (1972–73) | 29–34–0 |

March

| Game | Result | Date | Score | Opponent | Record |
|---|---|---|---|---|---|
| 64 | W | March 4, 1973 | 4–2 | @ New York Raiders (1972–73) | 30–34–0 |
| 65 | L | March 6, 1973 | 1–2 OT | @ Chicago Cougars (1972–73) | 30–35–0 |
| 66 | W | March 8, 1973 | 2–1 | Minnesota Fighting Saints (1972–73) | 31–35–0 |
| 67 | W | March 9, 1973 | 11–3 | Quebec Nordiques (1972–73) | 32–35–0 |
| 68 | L | March 11, 1973 | 2–4 | Houston Aeros (1972–73) | 32–36–0 |
| 69 | L | March 12, 1973 | 4–6 | Quebec Nordiques (1972–73) | 32–37–0 |
| 70 | W | March 13, 1973 | 4–3 | Houston Aeros (1972–73) | 33–37–0 |
| 71 | L | March 17, 1973 | 0–4 | @ New England Whalers (1972–73) | 33–38–0 |
| 72 | L | March 19, 1973 | 1–5 | @ Houston Aeros (1972–73) | 33–39–0 |
| 73 | W | March 21, 1973 | 7–3 | @ Houston Aeros (1972–73) | 34–39–0 |
| 74 | W | March 23, 1973 | 7–3 | @ Los Angeles Sharks (1972–73) | 35–39–0 |
| 75 | L | March 28, 1973 | 1–2 | Alberta Oilers (1972–73) | 35–40–0 |
| 76 | W | March 29, 1973 | 2–1 | Alberta Oilers (1972–73) | 36–40–0 |
| 77 | W | March 31, 1973 | 5–1 | Chicago Cougars (1972–73) | 37–40–0 |

April

| Game | Result | Date | Score | Opponent | Record |
|---|---|---|---|---|---|
| 78 | W | April 1, 1973 | 4–2 | Winnipeg Jets (1972–73) | 38–40–0 |

Legend: Win (2 points) Loss (0 points) Tie (1 point)

== Playoffs ==
1973 Avco Cup playoffs
Semifinals vs. Philadelphia Blazers – Blazers lose 4–0

| Game | Date | Visitor | Score | Home | Series |
|---|---|---|---|---|---|
| 1 | April 4 | Philadelphia Blazers | 2–3 OT | Cleveland Crusaders | 0–1 |
| 2 | April 7 | Philadelphia Blazers | 1–7 | Cleveland Crusaders | 0–2 |
| 3 | April 8 | Cleveland Crusaders | 3–1 | Philadelphia Blazers | 0–3 |
| 4 | April 11 | Cleveland Crusaders | 6–2 | Philadelphia Blazers | 0–4 |

Legend: Win Loss

== Player statistics ==
=== Skaters ===
Regular season
| Player | Position | GP | G | A | Pts | PIM | +/- | PPG | SHG | GWG |
|---|---|---|---|---|---|---|---|---|---|---|
| Andre Lacroix | C | 78 | 50 | 74 | 124 | 83 | 0 | 16 | 0 | 11 |
| Danny Lawson | RW | 78 | 61 | 45 | 106 | 35 | 0 | 20 | 3 | 6 |
| John McKenzie | RW | 60 | 28 | 50 | 78 | 157 | 0 | 8 | 1 | 7 |
| Bryan Campbell | C | 75 | 25 | 48 | 73 | 85 | 0 | 6 | 0 | 1 |
| Don Herriman | LW | 78 | 24 | 48 | 72 | 63 | 0 | 9 | 0 | 4 |
| Ron Plumb | D | 78 | 10 | 41 | 51 | 66 | 0 | 6 | 0 | 0 |
| Don Burgess | LW | 74 | 20 | 22 | 42 | 15 | 0 | 1 | 3 | 0 |
| Don O'Donoghue | RW | 74 | 16 | 23 | 39 | 43 | 0 | 1 | 0 | 0 |
| Irv Spencer | D | 54 | 2 | 27 | 29 | 43 | 0 | 0 | 0 | 0 |
| Jim Cardiff | D | 78 | 3 | 24 | 27 | 185 | 0 | 0 | 2 | 0 |
| Michel Plante | LW | 70 | 13 | 12 | 25 | 35 | 0 | 0 | 0 | 0 |
| Rychard Campeau | D | 75 | 1 | 18 | 19 | 72 | 0 | 1 | 0 | 0 |
| John Migneault | LW | 55 | 10 | 8 | 18 | 38 | 0 | 1 | 0 | 0 |
| Michel Boudreau | C | 33 | 7 | 7 | 14 | 4 | 0 | 1 | 0 | 0 |
| Camille Lapierre | D | 24 | 5 | 9 | 14 | 2 | 0 | 0 | 0 | 0 |
| John Bennett | LW | 34 | 4 | 6 | 10 | 18 | 0 | 1 | 0 | 0 |
| Derek Sanderson | C | 8 | 3 | 3 | 6 | 69 | 0 | 0 | 1 | 0 |
| Pierre Henry | C | 19 | 2 | 3 | 5 | 13 | 0 | 0 | 0 | 0 |
| Derek Harker | D | 27 | 0 | 5 | 5 | 46 | 0 | 0 | 0 | 0 |
| John Gravel | D | 8 | 1 | 3 | 4 | 0 | 0 | 0 | 0 | 0 |
| Nick Polano | D | 17 | 0 | 3 | 3 | 24 | 0 | 0 | 0 | 0 |
| Denis Meloche | C | 4 | 1 | 1 | 2 | 0 | 0 | 0 | 0 | 0 |
| Dave Hutchison | D | 28 | 0 | 2 | 2 | 34 | 0 | 0 | 0 | 0 |
| Pierre Paiement | RW | 8 | 1 | 0 | 1 | 18 | 0 | 0 | 0 | 0 |
| Claude St. Sauveur | C | 2 | 1 | 0 | 1 | 0 | 0 | 0 | 0 | 0 |
| Yves Archambault | G | 6 | 0 | 1 | 1 | 0 | 0 | 0 | 0 | 0 |
| Wayne Mosdell | D | 8 | 0 | 1 | 1 | 12 | 0 | 0 | 0 | 0 |
| Bernie Parent | G | 63 | 0 | 1 | 1 | 36 | 0 | 0 | 0 | 0 |
| Michel Rouleau | C | 6 | 0 | 1 | 1 | 15 | 0 | 0 | 0 | 0 |
| Bob Brown | D | 4 | 0 | 0 | 0 | 2 | 0 | 0 | 0 | 0 |
| Jack Chipchase | D | 4 | 0 | 0 | 0 | 2 | 0 | 0 | 0 | 0 |
| Tom Cottringer | G | 2 | 0 | 0 | 0 | 0 | 0 | 0 | 0 | 0 |
| Sam Gellard | LW | 5 | 0 | 0 | 0 | 0 | 0 | 0 | 0 | 0 |
| Frank Golembrosky | RW | 8 | 0 | 0 | 0 | 9 | 0 | 0 | 0 | 0 |
| Larry Mavety | D | 4 | 0 | 0 | 0 | 14 | 0 | 0 | 0 | 0 |
| Darwin Mott | LW | 1 | 0 | 0 | 0 | 0 | 0 | 0 | 0 | 0 |
| Murray Myers | RW | 7 | 0 | 0 | 0 | 0 | 0 | 0 | 0 | 0 |
| Marcel Paille | G | 15 | 0 | 0 | 0 | 0 | 0 | 0 | 0 | 0 |
| Danny Sullivan | G | 1 | 0 | 0 | 0 | 0 | 0 | 0 | 0 | 0 |

Playoffs
| Player | Position | GP | G | A | Pts | PIM | PPG | SHG | GWG |
|---|---|---|---|---|---|---|---|---|---|
| John McKenzie | RW | 4 | 3 | 1 | 4 | 8 | 1 | 0 | 0 |
| Andre Lacroix | C | 4 | 0 | 2 | 2 | 18 | 0 | 0 | 0 |
| Camille Lapierre | D | 4 | 0 | 2 | 2 | 0 | 0 | 0 | 0 |
| Ron Plumb | D | 4 | 0 | 2 | 2 | 13 | 0 | 0 | 0 |
| Don Burgess | LW | 4 | 1 | 0 | 1 | 0 | 0 | 0 | 0 |
| Rychard Campeau | D | 4 | 1 | 0 | 1 | 17 | 1 | 0 | 0 |
| Don Herriman | LW | 4 | 1 | 0 | 1 | 14 | 1 | 0 | 0 |
| Bryan Campbell | C | 3 | 0 | 1 | 1 | 8 | 0 | 0 | 0 |
| Danny Lawson | RW | 4 | 0 | 1 | 1 | 0 | 0 | 0 | 0 |
| Don O'Donoghue | RW | 4 | 0 | 1 | 1 | 0 | 0 | 0 | 0 |
| Yves Archambault | G | 3 | 0 | 0 | 0 | 0 | 0 | 0 | 0 |
| Michel Boudreau | C | 2 | 0 | 0 | 0 | 0 | 0 | 0 | 0 |
| Jim Cardiff | D | 4 | 0 | 0 | 0 | 11 | 0 | 0 | 0 |
| Dave Hutchison | D | 3 | 0 | 0 | 0 | 0 | 0 | 0 | 0 |
| John Migneault | LW | 4 | 0 | 0 | 0 | 0 | 0 | 0 | 0 |
| Murray Myers | RW | 2 | 0 | 0 | 0 | 0 | 0 | 0 | 0 |
| Marcel Paille | G | 1 | 0 | 0 | 0 | 0 | 0 | 0 | 0 |
| Bernie Parent | G | 1 | 0 | 0 | 0 | 0 | 0 | 0 | 0 |
| Michel Plante | LW | 4 | 0 | 0 | 0 | 2 | 0 | 0 | 0 |
| Irv Spencer | D | 4 | 0 | 0 | 0 | 4 | 0 | 0 | 0 |

==== Goaltending ====
Regular season
| Player | MIN | GP | W | L | T | GA | GAA | SO |
|---|---|---|---|---|---|---|---|---|
| Bernie Parent | 3653 | 63 | 33 | 28 | 0 | 220 | 3.61 | 2 |
| Marcel Paille | 611 | 15 | 2 | 8 | 0 | 49 | 4.81 | 0 |
| Yves Archambault | 260 | 6 | 1 | 3 | 0 | 17 | 3.92 | 0 |
| Tom Cottringer | 122 | 2 | 1 | 1 | 0 | 8 | 3.93 | 0 |
| Danny Sullivan | 60 | 1 | 1 | 0 | 0 | 3 | 3.00 | 0 |
| Team: | 4706 | 78 | 38 | 40 | 0 | 297 | 3.79 | 2 |

Playoffs
| Player | MIN | GP | W | L | GA | GAA | SO |
|---|---|---|---|---|---|---|---|
| Yves Archambault | 153 | 3 | 0 | 2 | 11 | 4.31 | 0 |
| Marcel Paille | 27 | 1 | 0 | 1 | 5 | 11.11 | 0 |
| Bernie Parent | 70 | 1 | 0 | 1 | 3 | 2.57 | 0 |
| Team: | 250 | 4 | 0 | 4 | 19 | 4.56 | 0 |

Note: Pos = Position; GP = Games played; G = Goals; A = Assists; Pts = Points; +/- = plus/minus; PIM = Penalty minutes; PPG = Power-play goals; SHG = Short-handed goals; GWG = Game-winning goals
MIN = Minutes played; W = Wins; L = Losses; T = Ties; GA = Goals-against; GAA = Goals-against average; SO = Shutouts;

== Awards and records ==
=== Awards ===
League awards and honors
| Award or honor | Recipient |
|---|---|
| All-Star Game representative | Danny Lawson; John McKenzie |
| Bill Hunter Trophy | Andre Lacroix |
| WHA First All-Star Team | Andre Lacroix (C); Danny Lawson (RW) |
| WHA Second All-Star Team | Bernie Parent (G) |

== Transactions ==
=== Trades ===
| Date | Details |
| February 12, 1972 | To Philadelphia Blazers futures | To Cleveland Crusaders Paul Shmyr |
| March 1, 1972 | To Philadelphia Blazers Andre Lacroix | To Quebec Nordiques cash |
| May 1, 1972 | To Philadelphia Blazers John McKenzie | To Quebec Nordiques futures |
| May 1, 1972 | To Philadelphia Blazers Bill Young cash futures | To Minnesota Fighting Saints Rick Smith |
| May 1, 1972 | To Philadelphia Blazers Bryan Campbell | To Chicago Cougars cash |
| June 1, 1972 | To Philadelphia Blazers Marcel Paille | To Chicago Cougars futures |
| June 1, 1972 | To Philadelphia Blazers Don O'Donoghue | To New England Whalers cash |
| June 1, 1972 | To Philadelphia Blazers futures | To New England Whalers Terry Caffery |
| October 1, 1972 | To Philadelphia Blazers Larry Mavety | To Los Angeles Sharks cash |
| November 1, 1972 | To Philadelphia Blazers John Gravel; Brit Selby | To Quebec Nordiques Frank Golembrosky; Michel Rouleau |
| November 1, 1972 | To Philadelphia Blazers Bob Brown | To New England Whalers Brit Selby |
| November 1, 1972 | To Philadelphia Blazers Roger Cote; Derek Harker | To Alberta Oilers cash |
| November 7, 1972 | To Philadelphia Blazers cash | To Chicago Cougars Larry Mavety |

== Draft picks ==
Philadelphia's picks at the WHA General Player Draft, which was held in Anaheim, California on February 12–13, 1972. The team participated in the draft as the Miami Screaming Eagles.

Players drafted by the Miami Screaming Eagles in the General Player Draft
| Round | Player | Position | Team |
|---|---|---|---|
| P | Bernie Parent | Goaltender | Toronto Maple Leafs (NHL) |
| P | Jude Drouin | Center | Minnesota North Stars (NHL) |
| P | Derek Sanderson | Center | Boston Bruins (NHL) |
| P | Bill White | Defense | Chicago Black Hawks (NHL) |
| 1 | Mike Bloom | Left Wing | St. Catharines Black Hawks (OHA) |
| 2 | Terry Caffery | Center | Cleveland Barons (AHL) |
| 3 | Neil Komadoski | Defense | Springfield Kings (AHL) |
| 4 | Yvon Lambert | Left Wing | Nova Scotia Voyageurs (AHL) |
| 5 | Bryan McSheffrey | Forward | Ottawa 67's (OHA) |
| 6 | Wayne Merrick | Center | Ottawa 67's (OHA) |
| 7 | Jean Potvin | Defense | Philadelphia Flyers (NHL) |
| 8 | Phil Russell | Defense | Edmonton Oil Kings (WCHL) |
| 9 | Carol Vadnais | Defense | California Golden Seals (NHL) |
| 10 | Rene Villemure | Forward | Shawinigan Bruins (QMJHL) |
| 11 | Michel Archambault | Left Wing | Dallas Black Hawks (CHL) |
| 12 | Rick Dudley | Left Wing | Cincinnati Swords (AHL) |
| 13 | Denis Dupere | Left Wing | Toronto Maple Leafs (NHL) |
| 14 | George Ferguson | Center | Toronto Marlboros (OHA) |
| 15 | Rick Foley | Defense | Philadelphia Flyers (NHL) |
| 16 | Don Martineau | Right Wing | New Westminster Bruins (WCHL) |
| 17 | Jim Nichols | Forward | Cincinnati Swords (AHL) |
| 18 | Simon Nolet | Right Wing | Philadelphia Flyers (NHL) |
| 19 | Paul Shmyr | Defense | California Golden Seals (NHL) |
| 20 | Claude St. Sauveur | Center | Sherbrooke Castors (QMJHL) |

== Farm teams ==
The Roanoke Valley Rebels in the EHL.

== See also ==
- 1972–73 WHA season
