= List of Vancouver Blazers players =

This is a list of players who played at least one game for the Vancouver Blazers (1973–74 to 1974–75) of the World Hockey Association (WHA).

== A ==
Jim Adair, Yves Archambault,

== B ==
Andy Bathgate, Serge Beaudoin, Michel Boudreau, Arnie Brown, Don Burgess,

== C ==
Bryan Campbell, Colin Campbell, Rychard Campeau, Jim Cardiff, Mike Chernoff, Ron Chipperfield,

== D ==
Butch Deadmarsh, Ray Delorenzi, Pete Donnelly, Peter Driscoll,

== G ==
George Gardner, Sam Gellard, Dave Given, Bud Gulka,

== H ==
Hugh Harris, Ed Hatoum, Dave Hutchison,

== I ==
Larry Israelson,

== J ==
Rick Jodzio, Jimmy Jones,

== L ==
Camille LaPierre, Danny Lawson,

== M ==
Ralph MacSweyn, Don McCulloch, John McKenzie, Don McLeod, Peter McNamee, Denis Meloche, John Migneault, Murray Myers,

== O ==
Don O'Donoghue,

== P ==
Mike Pelyk, Michel Plante, Ron Plumb, Pat Price,

== R ==
Duane Rupp,

== S ==
John Shmyr, Irv Spencer, Claude St. Sauveur, Danny Sullivan,

== T ==
Paul Terbenche, Jean Tetreault,

== W ==
Rob Walton, Ron Ward, Wayne Wood,
