= Michel Boudreau =

Canadian ice hockey player

- Born: September 26, 1952 (age 73) Asbestos, Quebec, Canada
- Height: 5 ft 11 in (180 cm)
- Weight: 165 lb (75 kg; 11 st 11 lb)
- Position: Centre
- Shot: Left
- Played for: Vancouver Blazers(WHA); Philadelphia Blazers(WHA)
- NHL draft: 3rd round (48th overall), 1972; Boston Bruins
- Playing career: 1972–1976

Michel Boudreau (born September 26, 1952) is a Canadian former professional ice hockey player who played in the World Hockey Association (WHA). Boudreau was selected by the Boston Bruins in the third round (48th overall) of the 1972 NHL Amateur Draft.

Including playoffs, Boudreau appeared in 38 WHA games, recording eight goals and seven assists, along with four penalty minutes.

== Career statistics ==
			Regular season					Playoffs
Season	Team	League	GP	G	A	Pts	PIM	GP	G	A	Pts	PIM
1969–70	Drummondville Rangers	QMJHL	1	0	0	0	0
1970–71	Drummondville Rangers	QMJHL	59	19	18	37	35	6	2	5	7	2
1971–72	Drummondville Rangers	QMJHL	23	7	14	21	12
1971–72	Laval National	QMJHL	40	36	27	63	47
1972–73	Roanoke Valley Rebels	EHL	20	7	13	20	6	--	--	--	--	--
1972–73	Philadelphia Blazers	WHA	33	7	7	14	4	2	0	0	0	0
1973–74	Vancouver Blazers	WHA	3	1	0	1	0	--	--	--	--	--
1973–74	Roanoke Valley Rebels	SHL	70	33	48	81	32	12	8	8	16	0
1974–75	Roanoke Valley Rebels	SHL	66	33	37	70	20	4	2	0	2	0
1975–76	Tidewater Sharks	SHL	22	9	7	16	2	--	--	--	--	--
1975–76	Hampton Gulls	SHL	37	9	25	34	22	9	2	4	6	0
WHA Totals			36	8	7	15	4	2	0	0	0	0
