= Pierre Paiement =

Canadian ice hockey player

- Born: September 13, 1950 (age 74); Montreal, Quebec, Canada
- Height: 5 ft 10 in (178 cm)
- Weight: 172 lb (78 kg; 12 st 4 lb)
- Position: Right wing
- Shot: Left
- Played for: Philadelphia Blazers
- NHL draft: Undrafted
- Playing career: 1972–1974

Pierre Paiement (born September 13, 1950) is a Canadian former professional ice hockey player who played in the World Hockey Association (WHA). Paiement played part of the 1972–73 WHA season with the Philadelphia Blazers.

== Career statistics ==
			Regular season					Playoffs
Season	Team	League	GP	G	A	Pts	PIM	GP	G	A	Pts	PIM
1972–73	Roanoke Valley Rebels	EHL	58	22	31	53	119	16	5	6	11	41
1972–73	Philadelphia Blazers	WHA	8	1	0	1	18	—	—	—	—	—
1973–74	Roanoke Valley Rebels	SHL	63	24	26	50	122	14	1	4	5	29
WHA totals			8	1	0	1	18	—	—	—	—	—
