= Wayne Mosdell =

Canadian ice hockey player

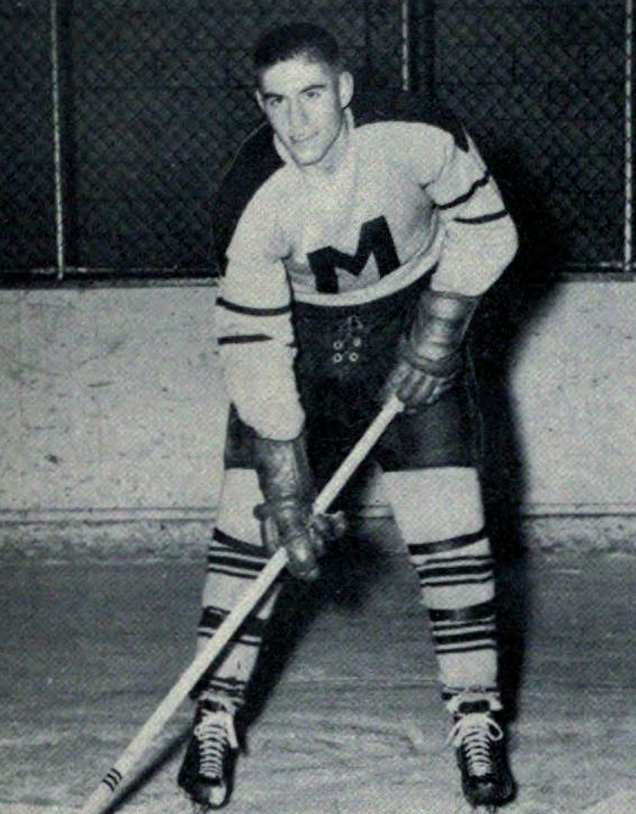
- at St. Michael's College, c. 1962
- Born: December 4, 1944 (age 81) Montreal, Quebec, Canada
- Height: 6 ft 3 in (191 cm)
- Weight: 185 lb (84 kg; 13 st 3 lb)
- Position: Defence
- Shot: Right
- Played for: Philadelphia Blazers
- Playing career: 1966–1976

Wayne Mosdell (born December 4, 1944) is a Canadian former professional ice hockey player who played in the World Hockey Association (WHA). Mosdell played part of the 1972–73 WHA season with the Philadelphia Blazers.

== Career statistics ==
=== Regular season and playoffs ===
			Regular season					Playoffs
Season	Team	League	GP	G	A	Pts	PIM	GP	G	A	Pts	PIM
1961–62	Toronto St. Michael's	OHA	5	0	1	1	0	—	—	—	—	—
1962–63	Toronto Neil McNeil Maroons	OHA	36	2	15	17	0	—	—	—	—	—
1963–64	Loyola College	CIAU	Statistics Unavailable
1964–65	Toronto Marlboros	OHA	55	8	17	25	0	—	—	—	—	—
1966–67	Springfield Indians	AHL	32	3	7	10	12	—	—	—	—	—
1966–67	Vancouver Canucks	WHL	15	1	2	3	4	8	0	1	1	2
1967–68	Memphis South Stars	CPHL	69	2	20	22	88	3	0	2	2	6
1968–69	Rochester Americans	AHL	61	0	10	10	69	—	—	—	—	—
1969–70	Rochester Americans	AHL	41	1	4	5	46	—	—	—	—	—
1969–70	Salem Rebels	EHL	23	2	13	15	20	5	0	2	2	6
1970–71	Roanoke Valley Rebels	EHL	73	12	33	45	16	5	0	5	5	0
1971–72	Roanoke Valley Rebels	EHL	73	13	31	44	82	6	1	1	2	6
1972–73	Roanoke Valley Rebels	EHL	63	15	25	40	112	15	5	12	17	27
1972–73	Philadelphia Blazers	WHA	8	0	1	1	12	—	—	—	—	—
1973–74	Roanoke Valley Rebels	SHL	70	9	48	57	102	14	1	11	12	12
1974–75	Roanoke Valley Rebels	SHL	72	21	51	72	71	4	0	3	3	4
1975–76	Roanoke Valley Rebels	SHL	59	4	31	35	81	—	—	—	—	—
1975–76	Hampton Gulls	SHL	12	1	3	4	8	8	0	6	6	22
WHA totals			8	0	1	1	12	—	—	—	—	—
