= Don Herriman =

Canadian ice hockey player (born 1946)

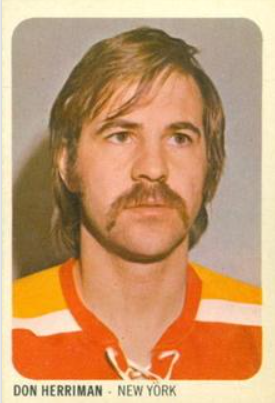
- Herriman in 1973 card
- Born: January 2, 1946 (age 80) Sault Ste. Marie, Ontario, Canada
- Height: 5 ft 10 in (178 cm)
- Weight: 165 lb (75 kg; 11 st 11 lb)
- Position: Left wing
- Shot: Left
- Played for: WHA; Philadelphia Blazers; New York Golden Blades; Jersey Knights; Edmonton Oilers
- Playing career: 1962–1975

Donald Herriman (born January 2, 1946) is a Canadian retired professional ice hockey forward. He played 155 games in the World Hockey Association with the Philadelphia Blazers, New York Golden Blades, Jersey Knights and Edmonton Oilers.

== Career statistics ==
=== Regular season and playoffs ===
			Regular season					Playoffs
Season	Team	League	GP	G	A	Pts	PIM	GP	G	A	Pts	PIM
1962–63	Peterborough Petes	OHA	50	11	11	22	0	—	—	—	—	—
1963–64	Peterborough Petes	OHA	32	7	6	13	0	—	—	—	—	—
1964–65	Peterborough Petes	OHA	44	17	16	33	0	—	—	—	—	—
1965–66	Peterborough Petes	OHA	20	1	1	2	29	—	—	—	—	—
1966–67	Muskegon Mohawks	IHL	10	3	3	6	23	—	—	—	—	—
1967–68	Memphis South Stars	CPHL	49	2	5	7	11	3	0	0	0	0
1968–69	Clinton Comets	EHL	71	25	27	52	83	17	9	13	22	27
1969–70	Clinton Comets	EHL	69	40	48	88	158	17	8	12	20	26
1970–71	Clinton Comets	EHL	69	26	26	52	43	5	2	0	2	0
1971–72	Clinton Comets	EHL	68	30	29	59	163	5	0	2	2	6
1972–73	Philadelphia Blazers	WHA	78	24	48	72	63	4	1	0	1	14
1973–74	New York Golden Blades/Jersey Knights	WHA	44	11	21	32	59	—	—	—	—	—
1974–75	Edmonton Oilers	WHA	33	1	2	3	21	—	—	—	—	—
1974–75	Winston–Salem Polar Twins	SHL	18	13	12	25	45	1	0	0	0	0
WHA totals			155	36	71	107	143	4	1	0	1	14
