= Daniel Sullivan (ice hockey, born 1947) =

Canadian ice hockey player

- Born: May 31, 1947 (age 78) Kimberley, British Columbia, Canada
- Height: 5 ft 8 in (173 cm)
- Weight: 155 lb (70 kg; 11 st 1 lb)
- Position: Goaltender
- Played for: WHA; Philadelphia Blazers; Vancouver Blazers; EHL; Roanoke Valley Rebels; IHL; Dayton Gems; AHL; Cincinnati Swords
- NHL draft: Undrafted
- Playing career: 1972–1978

Daniel "Danny" Sullivan (born May 31, 1947) is a Canadian former ice hockey goaltender who played in the World Hockey Association (WHA) for the Philadelphia Blazers and the Vancouver Blazers.

== Career ==
In his WHA career, Sullivan appeared in two games. He won his Philadelphia start, defeating the Los Angeles Sharks 4–3 on November 11, 1972. On March 21, 1974, he lost his only start with the Vancouver Blazers 7–1 to the New England Whalers.

== Career statistics ==
=== Regular season and playoffs ===
			Regular season									Playoffs
Season	Team	League	GP	W	L	T	MIN	GA	SO	GAA	SV%	GP	W	L	MIN	GA	SO	GAA	SV%
1971–72	Cranbrook Royals	WIHL	Statistics Unavailable
1972–73	Roanoke Valley Rebels	EHL	41	—	—	—	—	145	1	3.54	—	14	—	—	—	—	—	—	—
1972–73	Philadelphia Blazers	WHA	1	1	0	0	60	3	0	3.00	.912	—	—	—	—	—	—	—	—
1973–74	Dayton Gems	IHL	7	Statistics Unavailable
1973–74	Cincinnati Swords	AHL	1	—	—	—	60	1	0	1.00	—	—	—	—	—	—	—	—	—
1973–74	Charlotte Checkers	SHL	11	9	1	0	620	26	2	2.51	.923	4	—	—	—	—	—	—	—
1973–74	Roanoke Valley Rebels	SHL	14	10	3	0	820	38	3	2.78	.912	—	—	—	—	—	—	—	—
1973–74	Vancouver Blazers	WHA	1	0	1	0	60	7	0	7.00	.816	—	—	—	—	—	—	—	—
1974–75	Philadelphia Firebirds	NAHL	42	19	14	1	2157	138	1	3.84	—	2	—	—	—	—	—	—	—
1975–76	Philadelphia Firebirds	NAHL	15	5	9	0	824	74	0	5.39	—	—	—	—	—	—	—	—	—
1975–76	Winston-Salem Polar Twins	SHL	27	12	9	4	1528	79	0	3.10	.903	1	—	—	—	—	—	—	—
1976–77	Nelson Maple Leafs	WIHL	0	Statistics Unavailable
1977–78	Nelson Maple Leafs	WIHL	10	Statistics Unavailable
WHA totals			2	1	1	0	120	10	0	5.00	.861	—	—	—	—	—	—	—	—
