= Jim Cardiff =

Canadian ice hockey player

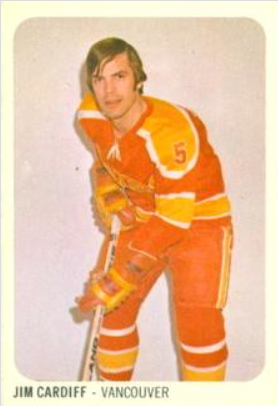
- Cardiff in 1973 card
- Born: August 29, 1944 (age 81) Dauphin, Manitoba, Canada
- Height: 5 ft 9 in (175 cm)
- Weight: 165 lb (75 kg; 11 st 11 lb)
- Position: Defence
- Shot: Left
- Played for: WHA; Philadelphia Blazers; Vancouver Blazers; AHL; Pittsburgh Hornets; CPHL/CHL; Memphis Wings; Fort Worth Wings; Tulsa Oilers; WHL; San Diego Gulls; NAHL; Johnstown Jets; EHL; Johnstown Red Wings
- NHL draft: Undrafted
- Playing career: 1965–1980

Garry James Cardiff (born August 29, 1944) is a Canadian retired professional ice hockey defenceman who played 200 games in the World Hockey Association for the Philadelphia Blazers and Vancouver Blazers.

== Career statistics ==
=== Regular season and playoffs ===
			Regular season					Playoffs
Season	Team	League	GP	G	A	Pts	PIM	GP	G	A	Pts	PIM
1961–62	Weyburn Red Wings	SJHL	Statistics Unavailable
1963–64	Weyburn Red Wings	SJHL	Statistics Unavailable
1964–65	Weyburn Red Wings	SJHL	Statistics Unavailable
1965–66	Pittsburgh Hornets	AHL	58	2	9	11	27	—	—	—	—	—
1965–66	Memphis Wings	CPHL	5	1	2	3	2	—	—	—	—	—
1966–67	Memphis Wings	CPHL	69	6	14	20	140	7	0	2	2	17
1967–68	Fort Worth Wings	CPHL	70	3	24	27	122	13	0	1	1	15
1968–69	San Diego Gulls	WHL	69	3	17	20	100	7	3	1	4	6
1969–70	Fort Worth Wings	CHL	70	3	33	36	160	7	0	0	0	17
1970–71	San Diego Gulls	WHL	70	1	26	27	190	6	0	3	3	13
1971–72	San Diego Gulls	WHL	72	6	9	15	106	4	0	0	0	4
1972–73	Philadelphia Blazers	WHA	78	3	24	27	185	4	0	0	0	11
1973–74	Vancouver Blazers	WHA	78	1	21	22	188	—	—	—	—	—
1974–75	Vancouver Blazers	WHA	44	0	2	2	25	—	—	—	—	—
1974–75	Tulsa Oilers	CHL	5	0	3	3	14	2	0	0	0	4
1975–76	Johnstown Jets	NAHL	72	5	52	57	135	7	1	8	9	32
1976–77	Johnstown Jets	NAHL	47	1	21	22	106	3	0	1	1	0
1979–80	Johnstown Red Wings	EHL	41	0	15	15	77	—	—	—	—	—
WHA totals			200	4	47	51	398	4	0	0	0	11
