= Tom Cottringer =

Canadian ice hockey player

- Born: December 28, 1947 (age 78) Niagara Falls, Ontario, Canada
- Height: 5 ft 8 in (173 cm)
- Weight: 160 lb (73 kg; 11 st 6 lb)
- Position: Goaltender
- Caught: Left
- Played for: Philadelphia Blazers
- Playing career: 1972–1973

Tom Cottringer (born December 28, 1947) is a Canadian former professional ice hockey player who played in the World Hockey Association (WHA). Cottringer played in two WHA games during the 1972–73 season with the Philadelphia Blazers.

== Career statistics ==
			Regular season									Playoffs
Season	Team	League	GP	W	L	T	MIN	GA	SO	GAA	SV%	GP	W	L	T	MIN	GA	SO	GAA	SV%
1972–73	Greensboro Generals	EHL	1	0	0	0	--	3	0	3.00	---	—	—	—	—	—	—	—	—	—
1972–73	Philadelphia Blazers	WHA	2	1	1	0	122	8	0	3.93	.877	—	—	—	—	—	—	—	—	—
WHA totals			2	1	1	0	122	8	0	3.93	.877	—	—	—	—	—	—	—	—	—
