= Sam Gellard =

Trinidad and Tobago ice hockey player

- Born: March 15, 1950 (age 76) Port of Spain, Trinidad and Tobago
- Height: 6 ft 0 in (183 cm)
- Weight: 183 lb (83 kg; 13 st 1 lb)
- Position: Left wing
- Shot: Left
- Played for: Philadelphia Blazers (WHA); Vancouver Blazers (WHA)
- Playing career: 1972–1974

Sam Gellard (born March 15, 1950) is a Trinidadian former professional ice hockey left winger. He played 28 games for the Philadelphia/Vancouver Blazers of the World Hockey Association (WHA). As a youth, he played in the 1962 Quebec International Pee-Wee Hockey Tournament with his team from Don Mills, Toronto.

Gellard's daughter Kim is a former World Curling champion.

== Career statistics ==
=== Regular season and playoffs ===
			Regular season					Playoffs
Season	Team	League	GP	G	A	Pts	PIM	GP	G	A	Pts	PIM
1967–68	London Nationals	OHA	43	13	18	31	50	—	—	—	—	—
1967–68	Toronto Marlboros	OHA	8	2	2	4	7	—	—	—	—	—
1969–70	University of Pennsylvania	ECAC	Statistics Unavailable
1970–71	University of Pennsylvania	ECAC	Statistics Unavailable
1972–73	Rhode Island Eagles	EHL	36	21	20	41	43	4	0	0	0	2
1972–73	Philadelphia Blazers	WHA	5	0	0	0	0	—	—	—	—	—
1973–74	Roanoke Valley Rebels	SHL	10	5	11	16	16	—	—	—	—	—
1973–74	Vancouver Blazers	WHA	23	7	4	11	15	—	—	—	—	—
WHA totals			28	7	4	11	15	—	—	—	—	—
