= Bud Gulka =

Canadian ice hockey player

- Born: April 12, 1947 (age 79) Kipling, Saskatchewan, Canada
- Height: 6 ft 0 in (183 cm)
- Weight: 190 lb (86 kg; 13 st 8 lb)
- Position: Forward
- Shot: Right
- Played for: WHA; Vancouver Blazers
- NHL draft: Undrafted
- Playing career: 1974–1975

Allan "Bud" Gulka (born April 12, 1947) is a Canadian former professional ice hockey player.

During the 1974–75 season, Gulka played five games in the World Hockey Association with the Vancouver Blazers.

== Career statistics ==
=== Regular season and playoffs ===
			Regular season					Playoffs
Season	Team	League	GP	G	A	Pts	PIM	GP	G	A	Pts	PIM
1974–75	Vancouver Blazers	WHA	5	1	0	1	10	–	–	–	–	–
1975–76	North Shore Hurry Kings	NWHL	Statistics Unavailable
1979–80	Delta Hurry Kings	BCSHL	Statistics Unavailable
WHA totals			5	1	0	1	10	—	—	—	—	—
