= Murray Myers =

Canadian ice hockey player

- Born: February 9, 1952 (age 74) Imperial, Saskatchewan, Canada
- Height: 6 ft 0 in (183 cm)
- Weight: 185 lb (84 kg; 13 st 3 lb)
- Position: Right wing
- Shot: Right
- Played for: Philadelphia Blazers; Vancouver Blazers; Cincinnati Stingers
- NHL draft: 57th overall, 1972; St. Louis Blues
- Playing career: 1972–1978

Murray Myers (born February 9, 1952) is a Canadian former professional ice hockey forward. He played 148 games in the World Hockey Association with the Philadelphia Blazers, Vancouver Blazers and Cincinnati Stingers.

== Career statistics ==
=== Regular season and playoffs ===
			Regular season					Playoffs
Season	Team	League	GP	G	A	Pts	PIM	GP	G	A	Pts	PIM
1969–70	Swift Current Broncos	WCHL	Statistics Unavailable
1970–71	Swift Current Broncos	WCHL	58	17	17	34	43	––	––	––	––	––
1971–72	Swift Current Broncos	WCHL	9	5	5	10	28	––	––	––	––	––
1971–72	Saskatoon Blades	WCHL	37	19	17	36	30	––	––	––	––	––
1972–73	Rhode Island Eagles	EHL	53	21	19	40	52	4	0	1	1	7
1972–73	Philadelphia Blazers	WHA	7	0	0	0	0	2	0	0	0	0
1973–74	Roanoke Valley Rebels	SHL	12	3	8	11	11	––	––	––	––	––
1973–74	Vancouver Blazers	WHA	61	22	20	42	28	––	––	––	––	––
1974–75	Vancouver Blazers	WHA	24	1	1	2	4	––	––	––	––	––
1974–75	Tulsa Oilers	CHL	25	8	8	16	16	2	0	0	0	0
1975–76	Cincinnati Stingers	WHA	56	14	15	29	12	––	––	––	––	––
1975–76	Hampton Gulls	SHL	25	7	11	18	13	––	––	––	––	––
1976–77	Kimberley Dynamiters	WIHL	––	10	6	16	10	––	––	––	––	––
1977–78	Kimberley Dynamiters	WIHL	––	21	22	43	18	––	––	––	––	––
WHA totals			148	37	36	73	44	2	0	0	0	0
