= Michel Plante =

Canadian ice hockey player

- Born: January 19, 1952 Drummondville, Quebec, Canada
- Died: July 9, 2025 (aged 73) Quebec City, Quebec, Canada
- Height: 5 ft 11 in (180 cm)
- Weight: 175 lb (79 kg; 12 st 7 lb)
- Position: Left wing
- Shot: Left
- Played for: Philadelphia Blazers; Vancouver Blazers
- NHL draft: 75th overall, 1972; Toronto Maple Leafs
- Playing career: 1972–1978

Michel Plante (January 19, 1952 – July 9, 2025) was a Canadian former professional ice hockey player who played in the World Hockey Association (WHA).

== Biography ==
As a youth, Plante played in the 1964 Quebec International Pee-Wee Hockey Tournament with a minor ice hockey team from Drummondville.

Drafted in the fifth round of the 1972 NHL Amateur Draft by the Toronto Maple Leafs, Plante opted to play in the WHA after being selected by the Miami Screaming Eagles in the WHA General Player Draft. He played parts of two seasons for the Blazers franchise — which had moved from Miami before their inaugural season — in Philadelphia and Vancouver.

== Career statistics ==
| | | | Regular season | | | | | Playoffs |
| Season | Team | League | GP | G | A | Pts | PIM | GP | G | A | Pts | PIM |
|---|---|---|---|---|---|---|---|---|---|---|---|---|
| 1969–70 | Drummondville Rangers | QMJHL | 56 | 28 | 21 | 49 | 43 | 6 | 2 | 5 | 7 | 24 |
| 1970–71 | Drummondville Rangers | QMJHL | 61 | 39 | 54 | 93 | 43 | 6 | 4 | 6 | 10 | 0 |
| 1971–72 | Drummondville Rangers | QMJHL | 62 | 34 | 54 | 88 | 34 | 9 | 5 | 10 | 15 | 4 |
| 1972–73 | Philadelphia Blazers | WHA | 70 | 13 | 12 | 25 | 35 | 4 | 0 | 0 | 0 | 2 |
| 1973–74 | Vancouver Blazers | WHA | 22 | 3 | 2 | 5 | 2 | — | — | — | — | — |
| 1973–74 | Roanoke Valley Rebels | SHL | 21 | 7 | 11 | 18 | 6 | 12 | 8 | 7 | 15 | 12 |
| 1974–75 | Philadelphia Firebirds | NAHL | 66 | 28 | 34 | 62 | 40 | 4 | 0 | 1 | 1 | 0 |
| 1975–76 | Philadelphia Firebirds | NAHL | 73 | 52 | 66 | 118 | 70 | 16 | 7 | 20 | 27 | 25 |
| 1976–77 | Philadelphia Firebirds | NAHL | 74 | 22 | 40 | 62 | 32 | 4 | 3 | 1 | 4 | 0 |
| 1977–78 | Port Huron Flags | IHL | 64 | 23 | 36 | 59 | 57 | 17 | 3 | 2 | 5 | 4 |
| WHA totals | | | 92 | 16 | 14 | 30 | 37 | 4 | 0 | 0 | 0 | 2 |

== Death ==
Plante died in Quebec City on July 9, 2025 at the age of 73.
