= Don Burgess (ice hockey) =

Canadian ice hockey player (1946–2023)

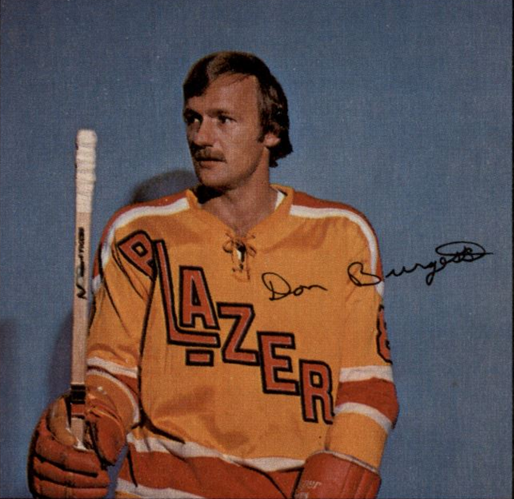
- Born: August 6, 1946 Point Edward, Ontario, Canada
- Died: March 17, 2023 (aged 76) Metaline Falls, Washington, U.S.
- Height: 6 ft 0 in (183 cm)
- Weight: 170 lb (77 kg; 12 st 2 lb)
- Position: Left wing
- Shot: Left
- NHL draft: Undrafted
- Playing career: 1967–1980

Donald Ruben Burgess (August 6, 1946 – March 17, 2023) was a Canadian professional ice hockey winger who played 446 games in the World Hockey Association (WHA). He played with the Philadelphia Blazers, Vancouver Blazers, San Diego Mariners, and Indianapolis Racers.

Following the demise of the WHA, he played Senior hockey with the Western International Hockey League's Spokane Flyers, winning the league championship, and the Allan Cup, the Senior Hockey title in 1979–80.

Burgess remained in Washington State from that time, and died in Metaline Falls, Washington on March 17, 2023, at the age of 76.

== Career statistics ==
=== Regular season and playoffs ===
			Regular season					Playoffs
Season	Team	League	GP	G	A	Pts	PIM	GP	G	A	Pts	PIM
1964–65	Sarnia Legionnaires	WOJBHL	—	—	—	—	—	—	—	—	—	—
1966–67	St. Catharines Black Hawks	OHA	42	6	11	17	30	—	—	—	—	—
1967–68	Greensboro Generals	EHL	72	30	38	68	56	11	5	8	13	5
1968–69	Greensboro Generals	EHL	72	44	51	95	25	8	1	7	8	0
1969–70	Greensboro Generals	EHL	74	36	49	85	26	16	11	17	28	0
1970–71	Greensboro Generals	EHL	72	41	76	117	18	9	4	1	5	0
1971–72	Greensboro Generals	EHL	73	39	58	97	29	11	7	8	15	11
1972–73	Philadelphia Blazers	WHA	74	20	22	42	15	4	1	0	1	0
1973–74	Vancouver Blazers	WHA	78	30	36	66	8	—	—	—	—	—
1974–75	Vancouver Blazers	WHA	62	11	18	29	19	—	—	—	—	—
1974–75	Tulsa Oilers	CHL	12	6	5	11	4	—	—	—	—	—
1975–76	San Diego Mariners	WHA	73	14	11	25	35	11	1	7	8	4
1976–77	San Diego Mariners	WHA	77	20	22	42	8	7	2	2	4	0
1977–78	Indianapolis Racers	WHA	79	11	12	23	2	—	—	—	—	—
1978–79	Indianapolis Racers	WHA	3	1	1	2	0	—	—	—	—	—
1978–79	San Diego Hawks	PHL	52	22	24	46	17	—	—	—	—	—
1979–80	Spokane Flyers	WIHL	?	41	42	83	0	—	—	—	—	—
1982–83	Spokane Chiefs	WIHL	?	29	42	71	14	—	—	—	—	—
1983–84	Spokane Chiefs	WIHL	?	18	38	56	26	—	—	—	—	—
WHA totals			446	107	122	229	87	22	4	9	13	4
