= Irv Spencer =

Canadian ice hockey player

- Born: December 4, 1937; Sudbury, Ontario, Canada
- Died: October 22, 1999 (aged 61)
- Height: 5 ft 10 in (178 cm)
- Weight: 180 lb (82 kg; 12 st 12 lb)
- Position: Defenceman
- Shot: Left
- Played for: Philadelphia Blazers; Vancouver Blazers; New York Rangers; Detroit Red Wings; Boston Bruins
- National team: Canada
- Playing career: 1954–1974

James Irvin Daniel Spencer (December 4, 1937 — October 22, 1999) was a Canadian ice hockey player who played 73 games in the World Hockey Association and 230 games in the National Hockey League between 1959 and 1974. Spencer played for the Philadelphia Blazers, Vancouver Blazers, New York Rangers, Detroit Red Wings and Boston Bruins.

== Career statistics ==
=== Regular season and playoffs ===
			Regular season					Playoffs
Season	Team	League	GP	G	A	Pts	PIM	GP	G	A	Pts	PIM
1947–48	Sudbury Gatchell Hardware	NOHA	—	—	—	—	—	—	—	—	—	—
1954–55	Kitchener Canucks	OHA	49	10	9	19	65	—	—	—	—	—
1955–56	Kitchener Canucks	OHA	48	4	9	13	36	8	1	0	1	16
1956–57	Hull-Ottawa Canadiens	QHL	8	1	2	3	2	—	—	—	—	—
1956–57	Peterborough T.P.T.'s	OHA	45	6	26	32	68	—	—	—	—	—
1957–58	Montreal Royals	QHL	3	0	1	1	2	—	—	—	—	—
1957–58	Peterborough T.P.T.'s	OHA	52	8	31	39	76	5	3	1	4	8
1958–59	Montreal Royals	QHL	45	6	12	18	55	8	1	2	3	8
1959–60	New York Rangers	NHL	32	1	2	3	20	—	—	—	—	—
1959–60	Trois-Rivières Lions	EPHL	18	3	4	7	8	—	—	—	—	—
1959–60	Springfield Indians	AHL	14	0	5	5	12	—	—	—	—	—
1960–61	New York Rangers	NHL	56	1	8	9	30	—	—	—	—	—
1961–62	New York Rangers	NHL	43	2	10	12	31	1	0	0	0	2
1962–63	Boston Bruins	NHL	69	5	17	22	34	—	—	—	—	—
1963–64	Detroit Red Wings	NHL	25	3	0	3	8	11	0	0	0	0
1963–64	Cincinnati Wings	CPHL	23	3	8	11	34	—	—	—	—	—
1963–64	Pittsburgh Hornets	AHL	18	5	8	13	2	—	—	—	—	—
1964–65	Pittsburgh Hornets	AHL	72	18	22	40	45	4	0	0	0	0
1964–65	Detroit Red Wings	NHL	—	—	—	—	—	1	0	0	0	4
1965–66	Memphis Wings	CPHL	54	12	21	33	14	—	—	—	—	—
1965–66	Pittsburgh Hornets	AHL	19	4	11	15	26	—	—	—	—	—
1965–66	Detroit Red Wings	NHL	—	—	—	—	—	3	0	0	0	2
1966–67	Memphis Wings	CPHL	30	2	6	8	8	7	0	5	5	4
1966–67	Pittsburgh Hornets	AHL	2	0	1	1	0	—	—	—	—	—
1967–68	Detroit Red Wings	NHL	5	0	1	1	4	—	—	—	—	—
1967–68	Fort Worth Wings	CPHL	55	7	31	38	42	13	3	3	6	12
1968–69	Fort Worth Wings	CHL	49	7	18	25	24	—	—	—	—	—
1969–70	San Diego Gulls	WHL	62	13	25	38	26	6	0	3	3	8
1970–71	San Diego Gulls	WHL	45	2	5	17	24	6	2	0	2	19
1971–72	Fort Worth Wings	CHL	1	0	0	0	0	—	—	—	—	—
1972–73	Rhode Island Eagles	EHL	11	3	3	6	4	—	—	—	—	—
1972–73	Philadelphia Blazers	WHA	54	2	27	29	43	4	0	0	0	0
1973–74	Vancouver Blazers	WHA	5	0	1	1	4	—	—	—	—	—
WHA totals			73	2	28	30	49	4	0	0	0	0
NHL totals			230	12	38	50	127	16	0	0	0	8
