= John Migneault =

Canadian ice hockey player (1949–2020)

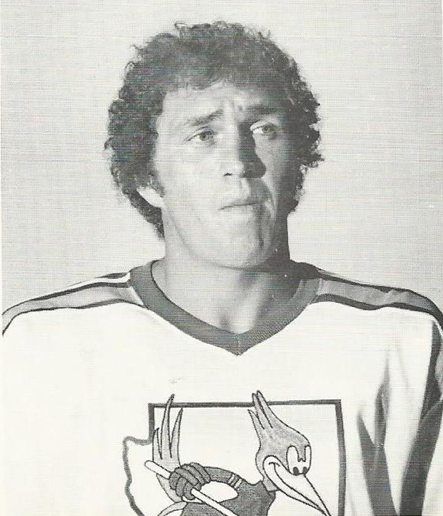
- Born: February 4, 1949 Gull Lake, Saskatchewan, Canada
- Died: January 5, 2020 (aged 70) Kimberley, British Columbia, Canada
- Height: 5 ft 10 in (178 cm)
- Weight: 185 lb (84 kg; 13 st 3 lb)
- Position: Right wing
- Shot: Left
- Played for: Philadelphia Blazers; Vancouver Blazers; Phoenix Roadrunners
- Playing career: 1970–1986

John Conrad Migneault (February 4, 1949 – January 5, 2020) was a Canadian professional ice hockey player who played 258 games in the World Hockey Association. He played for the Philadelphia Blazers, Vancouver Blazers, and Phoenix Roadrunners. He was born in Gull Lake, Saskatchewan, and died in Kimberley, British Columbia of cancer.

== Career statistics ==
=== Regular season and playoffs ===
			Regular season					Playoffs
Season	Team	League	GP	G	A	Pts	PIM	GP	G	A	Pts	PIM
1965–66	Regina Pats	SJHL	Statistics Unavailable
1967–68	Swift Current Broncos	WCJHL	58	13	29	42	76	—	—	—	—	—
1968–69	Swift Current Broncos	WCHL	50	13	27	40	65	—	—	—	—	—
1969–70	Swift Current Broncos	WCHL	Statistics Unavailable
1970–71	Muskegon Mohawks	IHL	69	16	23	39	66	6	0	3	3	0
1971–72	Muskegon Mohawks	IHL	72	10	18	28	46	11	2	1	3	30
1972–73	Roanoke Valley Rebels	EHL	18	4	13	17	15	—	—	—	—	—
1972–73	Philadelphia Blazers	WHA	55	10	8	18	38	4	0	0	0	0
1973–74	Vancouver Blazers	WHA	74	21	26	47	27	—	—	—	—	—
1974–75	Tulsa Oilers	CHL	8	5	3	8	0	—	—	—	—	—
1974–75	Vancouver Blazers	WHA	14	4	2	6	12	—	—	—	—	—
1974–75	Phoenix Roadrunners	WHA	47	6	13	19	16	1	0	0	0	0
1975–76	Phoenix Roadrunners	WHA	68	8	12	20	14	3	0	0	0	0
1976–77	Kimberley Dynamiters	WIHL	--	2	10	12	23	—	—	—	—	—
1977–78	Kimberley Dynamiters	WIHL	--	11	32	43	54	—	—	—	—	—
1982–83	Kimberley Dynamiters	WIHL	Statistics Unavailable
1984–85	Kimberley Dynamiters	WIHL	25	6	18	24	16	—	—	—	—	—
1985–86	Kimberley Dynamiters	WIHL	--	8	12	20	0	—	—	—	—	—
WHA totals			258	49	61	110	107	8	0	0	0	0
