= John McKenzie (ice hockey) =

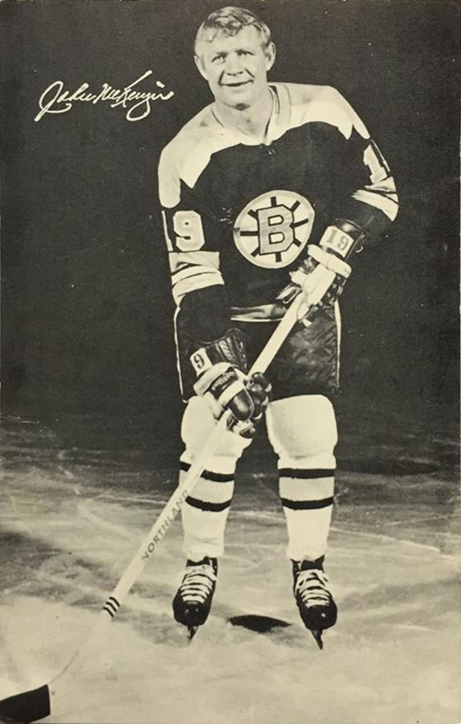
- McKenzie with the Boston Bruins in 1969
- Born: December 12, 1937 High River, Alberta, Canada
- Died: June 9, 2018 (aged 80) Wakefield, Massachusetts, U.S.
- Height: 5 ft 9 in (175 cm)
- Weight: 170 lb (77 kg; 12 st 2 lb)
- Position: Right wing
- Shot: Right
- Played for: Chicago Black Hawks; Detroit Red Wings; New York Rangers; Boston Bruins; Philadelphia Blazers; Vancouver Blazers; Minnesota Fighting Saints; Cincinnati Stingers; New England Whalers
- National team: Canada
- Playing career: 1958–1979

John Albert McKenzie (December 12, 1937 – June 9, 2018) was a Canadian professional hockey player and coach. He played in the National Hockey League (NHL) for 12 seasons, most notably with the Boston Bruins, with whom he won the Stanley Cup twice. He joined the World Hockey Association (WHA) in 1972 and played in all seven seasons of the league's existence, with his final three coming with the New England Whalers; in 477 total WHA games, he recorded 413 total points.

== Playing career ==
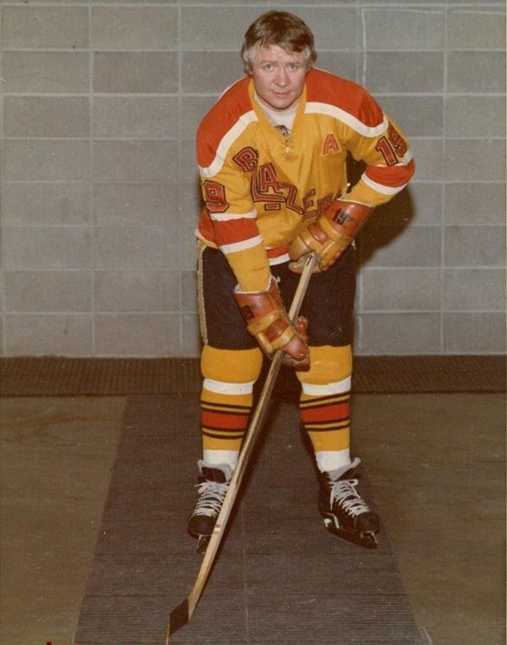
McKenzie with the Vancouver Blazers in 1974.

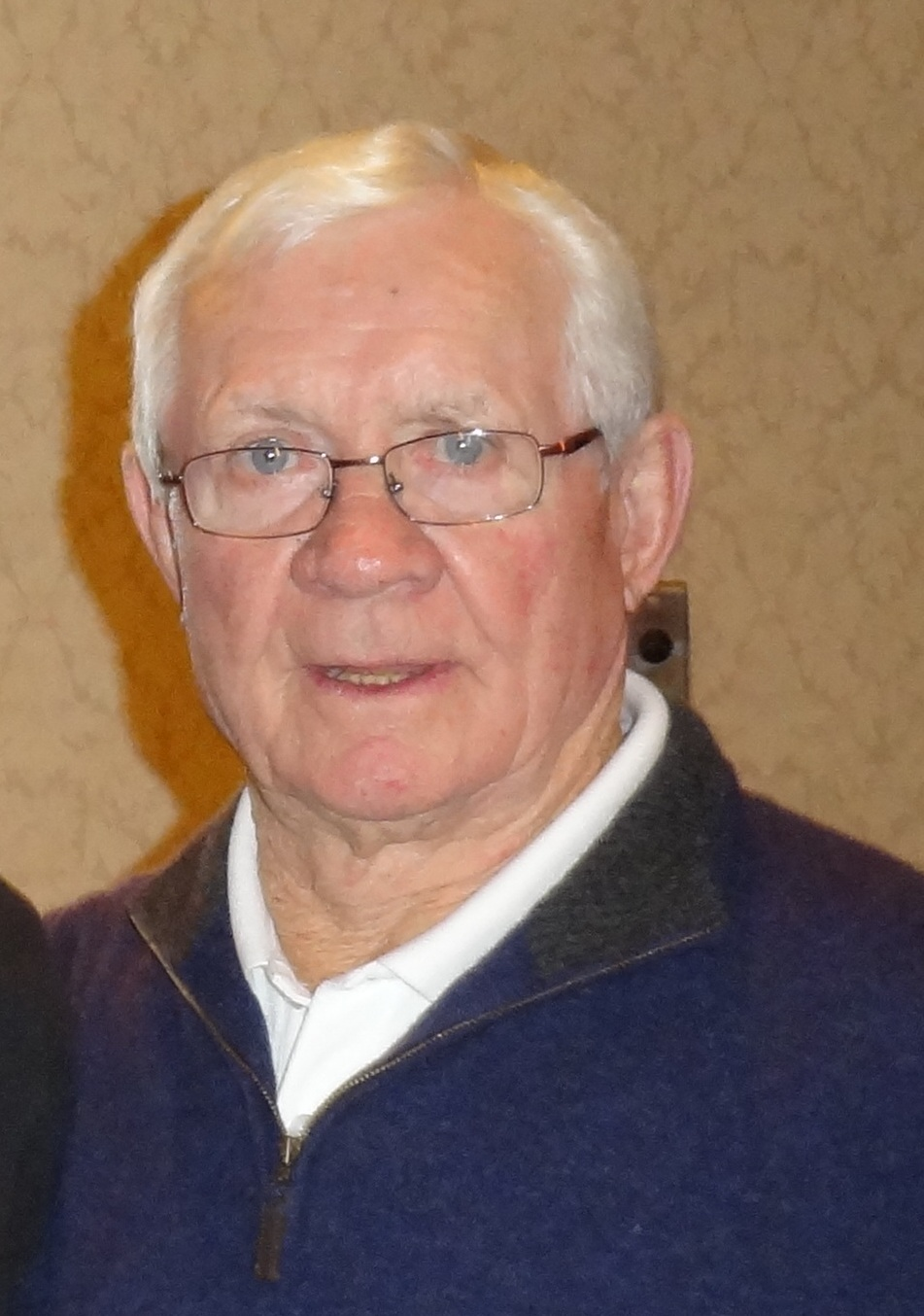
McKenzie in 2012.

McKenzie's former teammate Gerry Melnyk dubbed the young player "Pieface" for his resemblance to a cartoon figure of the same name featured on the wrapper of a popular Canadian candy bar; this was later shortened to "Pie." He played junior hockey for three years with the St. Catharines Teepees of the OHA and led the league in goals and points in 1958.

McKenzie made his NHL debut in 1958–59 with the Chicago Black Hawks. The following season he moved on to the Detroit Red Wings, where he lasted two years. He was then demoted again to the minors, where he played most of three seasons in the American Hockey League with the Hershey Bears and the Buffalo Bisons, and was named to the league's First All-Star Team in 1963. He returned to the NHL and the Black Hawks in 1963–64, and two years later played for the New York Rangers for part of the 1965–66 season, halfway during which he was traded to the Rangers' arch-rivals, the Boston Bruins. McKenzie scored his first goal as a Bruin on January 20, 1966, in Boston's 4–3 home victory over Chicago.

It was with the Bruins that the 5-foot-9-inch, 170 pound (77 kg) right wing had the most productive seasons of his career. He became a star in the 1967-68 season, scoring twenty-eight goals and gaining a reputation as a pesky, relentless hustler. He scored twenty-nine goals each of the next two seasons, and was named to the Second Team All-Star in 1969–70. In the playoffs that year he scored seventeen points in fourteen games, fourth on the team after Bobby Orr, Phil Esposito and John Bucyk and did so again in 1971-72. His best season was 1970–71, when he scored 31 goals and 77 points in 65 games. All in all, McKenzie scored 169 goals in his seven years in Boston and helped the Bruins win two Stanley Cup titles, in 1970 and 1972.

At the end of the sixth and last game in the 1972 Stanley Cup finals, when the Bruins defeated the New York Rangers at Madison Square Garden 3–0 to take the Cup, McKenzie skated to center ice, raised one arm in mimicry of the Statue of Liberty, placed his other hand around his neck to appear as though he were choking, then jumped up and down in a circle several times. (Thus he implied, to the Rangers and their fans, that the Rangers had choked at their best chance of winning their first Stanley Cup since 1940). This became known as the "McKenzie Choke Dance," or simply the "choke dance."

In the summer of 1972, McKenzie was disgruntled at being left unprotected in the 1972 NHL expansion draft, and he signed as player-coach with the Philadelphia Blazers of the newly formed World Hockey Association (WHA). In thirteen games he recorded only two wins and eleven losses, and he stepped down as coach in favor of veteran Phil Watson. He continued to play effectively for the Blazers, then for the Minnesota Fighting Saints, the Cincinnati Stingers and finally the New England Whalers. He finished his career in the WHA's final season in 1978–79, having played twenty-one seasons of professional hockey in the NHL and WHA.

== Later life ==
In 2007, McKenzie served as the coach of the Berklee Ice Cats, the newly formed hockey team at Berklee College of Music in Boston. Following that, he was the liaison for hockey development at the University of Massachusetts Lowell.

McKenzie died at his home in Wakefield, Massachusetts, at age 80 on June 9, 2018, after a long illness.

== Career achievements and legacy ==
- Played in 477 WHA games (7th all-time), totalling 163 goals, 250 assists and 413 points (16th all-time)
- Played in the NHL All-Star Game in 1970 and 1972
- Played in the Summit Series for Team Canada in 1974 against the Soviet Union
- His #19 was retired by the Hartford Whalers, making him one of only three players whose number was retired by an NHL franchise for which he never played (the other two being J. C. Tremblay by the Quebec Nordiques and Frank Finnigan by the modern-day Ottawa Senators).
- In 2010, he was elected as an inaugural inductee into the World Hockey Association Hall of Fame in the "Legends of the Game" category.

== Honours ==
Buffalo Bisons

- Calder Cup: 1963

NHL

- Stanley Cup: 1970, 1972

Boston Bruins

- Named One of the Top 100 Best Bruins Players of all Time.
- Seventh Player Award — 1970

== Career statistics ==
=== Regular season and playoffs ===
			Regular season					Playoffs
Season	Team	League	GP	G	A	Pts	PIM	GP	G	A	Pts	PIM
1953–54	Calgary Buffaloes	WCJHL	34	6	8	14	12	5	0	0	0	2
1954–55	Medicine Hat Tigers	WCJHL	39	14	4	18	33	5	0	0	0	4
1955–56	Nanton Palominos	FHHL	—	—	—	—	—	—	—	—	—	—
1955–56	Calgary Stampeders	WHL	1	0	0	0	0	2	0	1	1	2
1956–57	St. Catharines Teepees	OHA	52	32	38	70	143	14	9	11	20	50
1957–58	St. Catharines Teepees	OHA	52	48	51	99	227	8	8	4	12	19
1958–59	Chicago Black Hawks	NHL	32	3	4	7	22	2	0	0	0	2
1958–59	Calgary Stampeders	WHL	13	2	5	7	18	—	—	—	—	—
1959–60	Detroit Red Wings	NHL	59	8	12	20	50	2	0	0	0	0
1960–61	Detroit Red Wings	NHL	16	3	1	4	13	—	—	—	—	—
1960–61	Hershey Bears	AHL	47	19	23	42	84	8	3	6	9	10
1961–62	Hershey Bears	AHL	58	30	29	59	149	7	1	2	3	19
1962–63	Buffalo Bisons	AHL	71	35	46	81	122	13	8	12	20	28
1963–64	Chicago Black Hawks	NHL	45	9	9	18	50	4	0	1	1	6
1964–65	St. Louis Braves	CHL	5	5	4	9	17	—	—	—	—	—
1964–65	Chicago Black Hawks	NHL	51	8	10	18	46	11	0	1	1	6
1965–66	New York Rangers	NHL	35	6	5	11	36	—	—	—	—	—
1965–66	Boston Bruins	NHL	36	13	9	22	36	—	—	—	—	—
1966–67	Boston Bruins	NHL	69	17	19	36	98	—	—	—	—	—
1967–68	Boston Bruins	NHL	74	28	38	66	107	4	1	1	2	8
1968–69	Boston Bruins	NHL	60	29	27	56	99	10	2	2	4	17
1969–70	Boston Bruins	NHL	72	29	41	70	114	14	5	12	17	35
1970–71	Boston Bruins	NHL	65	31	46	77	120	7	2	3	5	22
1971–72	Boston Bruins	NHL	77	22	47	69	126	15	5	12	17	37
1972–73	Philadelphia Blazers	WHA	60	28	50	78	157	4	3	1	4	8
1973–74	Vancouver Blazers	WHA	45	14	38	52	71	—	—	—	—	—
1974–75	Vancouver Blazers	WHA	74	23	37	60	84	—	—	—	—	—
1975–76	Minnesota Fighting Saints	WHA	57	21	26	47	52	—	—	—	—	—
1975–76	Cincinnati Stingers	WHA	12	3	10	13	6	—	—	—	—	—
1976–77	Minnesota Fighting Saints	WHA	40	17	13	30	42	—	—	—	—	—
1976–77	New England Whalers	WHA	34	11	19	30	25	5	2	1	3	8
1977–78	New England Whalers	WHA	79	27	29	56	61	14	6	6	12	16
1978–79	New England Whalers	WHA	76	19	28	47	115	10	3	7	10	10
NHL totals			691	206	268	474	917	69	15	32	47	133
WHA totals			477	163	250	413	619	33	14	15	29	42

=== International ===
Year	Team	Event	GP	G	A	Pts	PIM
1974	Canada	SS	7	2	3	5	14

== Coaching record ==
Team	Year	Regular season						Post season
Team	Year	G	W	L	T	Pts	Finish	Result
Philadelphia Blazers	1972-73	7	1	6	0	(2)	3rd in WHA East	(resigned)
Vancouver Blazers	1973-74	7	3	4	0	(6)	5th in WHA West	(interim coach)
