= Bernie Parent =

Canadian ice hockey player (1945–2025)

- Hockey Hall of Fame, 1984
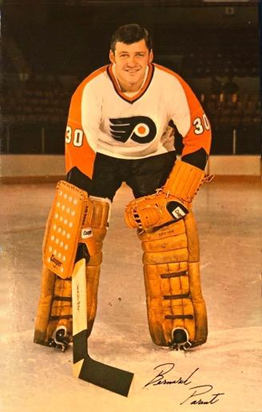
- Parent with the Philadelphia Flyers in 1970
- Born: April 3, 1945 Montreal, Quebec, Canada
- Died: September 21, 2025 (aged 80) Avalon, New Jersey, U.S.
- Height: 5 ft 10 in (178 cm)
- Weight: 170 lb (77 kg; 12 st 2 lb)
- Position: Goaltender
- Caught: Left
- Played for: Boston Bruins; Philadelphia Flyers; Toronto Maple Leafs; Philadelphia Blazers
- Playing career: 1965–1979

Bernard Marcel Parent (April 3, 1945 – September 21, 2025) was a Canadian professional ice hockey goaltender who played 13 National Hockey League (NHL) seasons with the Philadelphia Flyers, Boston Bruins, and Toronto Maple Leafs between 1965 and 1979, and also spent one season in the World Hockey Association (WHA) with the Philadelphia Blazers during the 1972–73 season. Parent is widely acknowledged as one of the greatest goaltenders of all time.

During the 1973–74 and 1974–75 seasons, in what many consider the finest consecutive seasons ever by a goaltender, the Flyers won the Stanley Cup twice and Parent won the Vezina Trophy and Conn Smythe Trophy both seasons. In that two-year run of dominance, Parent posted 30 shutouts in regular and post season play combined. A 1984 inductee into the Hockey Hall of Fame, Parent was rated number 63 on The Hockey News' list of The Top 100 NHL Players of All-Time in 1998. Parent remained an iconic fan favorite in Philadelphia more than three decades after his retirement. In 2017, Parent was named one of the '100 Greatest NHL Players' in history.

== Early years ==
Parent was born on April 3, 1945 in east Montreal. He was the youngest of seven siblings. He grew up in Rosemont, Quebec, a district of Montreal. Parent's hero as a young boy was Montreal Canadiens goalie Jacques Plante, whose sister lived in Parent's neighbourhood. Many times Parent watched out for Plante's visits to his sister and her family. Plante later became his teammate and mentor in 1971 for the Toronto Maple Leafs, when Plante was 43.

== Playing career ==
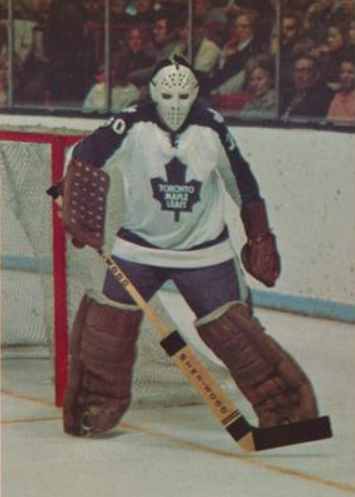
Parent with the Toronto Maple Leafs c. 1971

Parent played for the Niagara Falls Flyers of the OHA Junior A league. A two-time winner of the Dave Pinkney Trophy (lowest goals-against average or GAA), he wrapped up his junior career on the team that won the OHA championship and the Memorial Cup championship in 1965.

Parent began his career with the Boston Bruins in the 1965–66 season, appearing in 39 games. The following season was split between Boston and the Bruins' farm club in Oklahoma.

Left unprotected for the 1967 NHL Expansion Draft, Parent was chosen by the Philadelphia Flyers on June 6, 1967, where he and Doug Favell, another former Bruin prospect, split the netminding duties for the Flyers' first season. Parent recorded a 2.48 GAA with four shutouts and the Flyers finished first in the NHL's West Division. Over the next two seasons, with Favell performing inconsistently or injured, Parent became the Flyers' #1 goalie and appeared in 58 and 62 games for the Flyers achieving impressive save percentages of .925 and .921, although due to the weakness of the Flyers who allowed a lot of shots, his GAA and win totals were not nearly as impressive.

Looking for help up front to improve the club's offence, Philadelphia dealt Parent and a second-round pick in the 1971 NHL Amateur Draft (Rick Kehoe) to the Toronto Maple Leafs for Bruce Gamble and a first-round selection (Pierre Plante) in the same draft in a three-way transaction that also involved Boston on January 31, 1971. The Flyers acquired Rick MacLeish and Danny Schock from the Bruins who received Mike Walton from the Maple Leafs. The trade turned out to be a positive turn for Parent. In Toronto, Parent joined his boyhood hero, Jacques Plante, who at 42 was having an all-star season. Under Plante's tutelage, Parent became a more consistent and technically proficient goalie. Parent played well for the Leafs through the 1971–72 season, gaining valuable regular season and playoff experience.

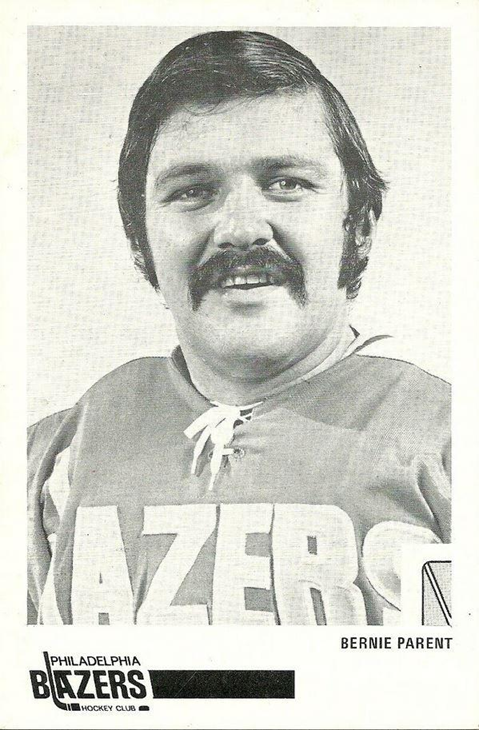
Parent with the Philadelphia Blazers c. 1972

On February 22, 1972, Parent signed a large contract with the Miami Screaming Eagles of the newly formed World Hockey Association. He was the first NHL player to jump to the new league. The Eagles did not materialize as planned, and Parent signed with the Philadelphia Blazers on June 3, 1972. After leaving the team over a contract dispute, he sought a return to the NHL but did not wish to return to the Leafs. On May 15, 1973, Toronto traded Parent's NHL rights back to the Flyers for Favell and a first-round pick in that summer's (1973) amateur draft (defenseman Bob Neely).

The next two seasons were the greatest of his career and would see Parent record a combined 30 regular and post-season shutout victories. Parent's play between 1973 and 1975 has been described as two of the best consecutive seasons ever by any goaltender. Playing 73 games in a 78-game schedule, Parent sparkled in leading the league with a 1.89 GAA, a .932 save percentage and 12 shutouts. He began the 1973–74 season with two shutouts besting Favell 2–0 in the season opener against Toronto in Philadelphia. He shared the Vezina Trophy with Chicago's Tony Esposito (as Philadelphia and Chicago tied as the teams allowing the fewest goals against in the regular season), was named the first-team all-star goaltender and finished second in the voting for the Hart Trophy as the league's Most Valuable Player (since 1963 the only goaltenders to win the Hart Trophy have been Dominik Hašek in both 1996–97 and 1997–98, Jose Theodore in 2002, Carey Price in 2015, and Connor Hellebuyck in 2025) as the Flyers skated to a first-place finish in the West Division.

He won the Conn Smythe Trophy (playoff MVP) and the Flyers won the first of consecutive Stanley Cup championships against the Boston Bruins. In the sixth and deciding game of the finals, Parent stopped a savage slapshot blast from Ken Hodge with a classic kick save move with less than 3 minutes to play on what turned out to be the Bruins' 30th and last shot. The spectacular save preserved the shutout and the championship-deciding win and became an often used highlight during advertising for NBC's coverage of the NHL the next season.

The following year, he again posted 12 shutouts while having a 2.03 GAA and a .918 save percentage. He won another Vezina Trophy, another first-team all-star selection and a second Conn Smythe Trophy and Stanley Cup while finishing fourth in the Hart Trophy voting. His 1975 playoff performance was even more impressive than the previous year as he had 4 shutouts (versus 2 the previous year) with a 1.89 GAA (versus 2.02). In both championship playoff runs, Parent shut out the opposition in the deciding sixth game of the Stanley Cup Final defeating the Boston Bruins 1–0 in 1974 and the Buffalo Sabres 2–0 in 1975. "Only the Lord saves more than Bernie Parent" became a catch-phrase and bumper sticker in Philadelphia in those years.

As the Flyers prepared a run at the championship for a third consecutive year, Parent was sidelined by a pre-season neck injury requiring surgery and he appeared in only 11 games in 1975–76. Parent had pinched a nerve in his neck causing radiating pain. Doctors removed a disk and a section of bone hoping to alleviate the symptoms but Parent suffered from continued pain in his neck throughout the rest of his career. He returned to the lineup late in the season but he was inconsistent and could not regain the starting job from netminder Wayne Stephenson. Without Parent's Conn Smythe level performance that year, the Flyers fell in the Stanley Cup Final in four straight games to the Montreal Canadiens.

Over the next three seasons, he experienced difficulties at times. Hockey was changing from a defense-oriented game to one that favored high scoring. Snipers like Mike Bossy, Guy Lafleur and Marcel Dionne were becoming major stars and dominating play. Plante, although in retirement, continued to have a strong influence on Parent's career. Parent, like Plante, was a stand-up type goalie. At one point Parent was playing poorly and considering retirement. Plante watched him practice in Philadelphia for two days, then told Parent exactly what he was doing wrong: sitting back on his heels, backing into his crease and losing concentration. Parent heeded Plante's advice and returned to form.

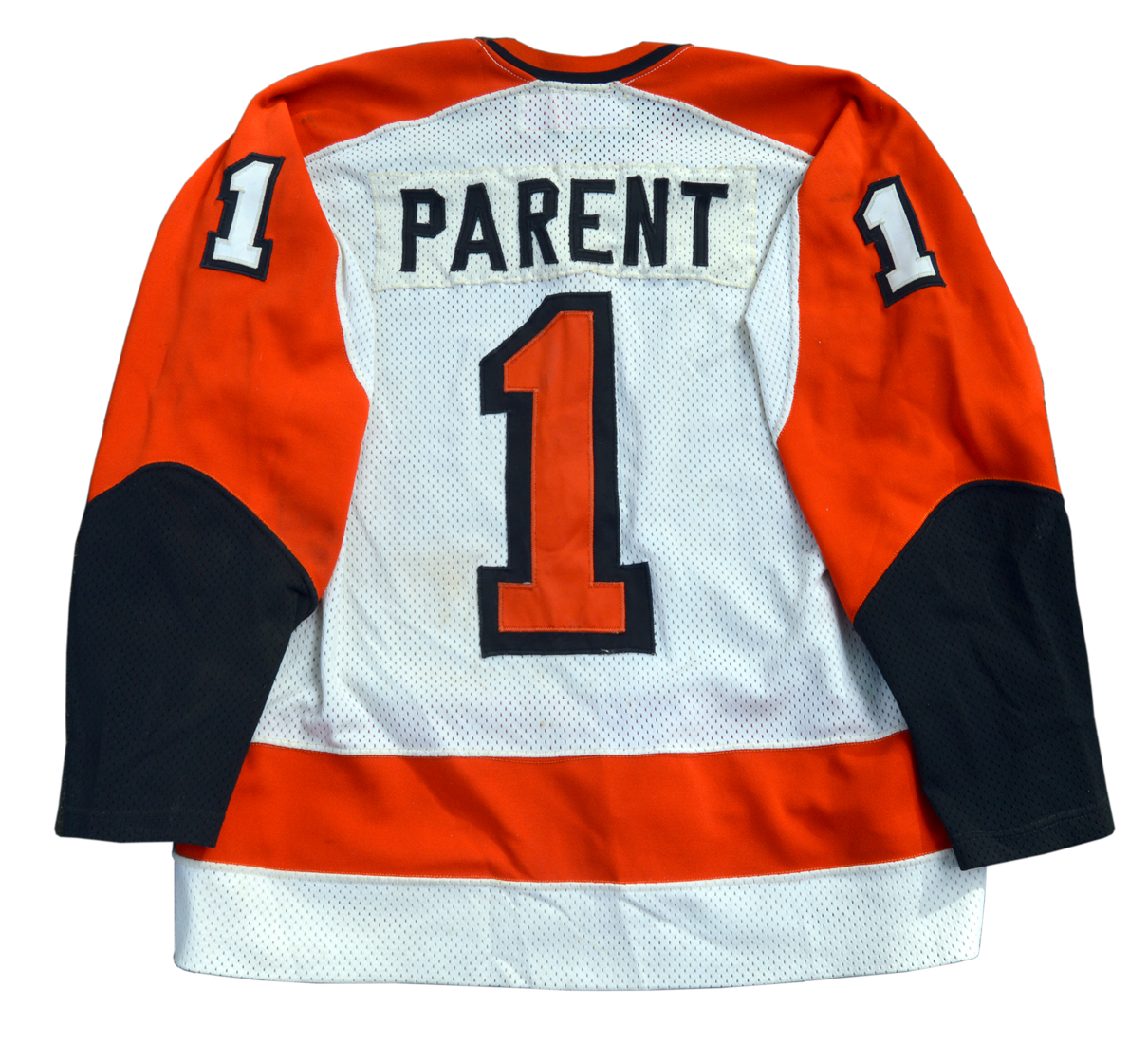
The #1 Flyers sweater worn by Bernie Parent in his last game on February 17, 1979

During the 1977–1978 season, he adopted the more confident, challenging style characteristic of his play during the championship years posting a 2.22 GAA, a .912 save percentage and a league-leading 7 shutouts in 49 games. However, as the 1970s were drawing to a close, the era of the stand-up goaltender was coming to an end. The never-before-seen goal-scoring totals of the early 1980s eventually forced a revolution in goaltender style and play. The butterfly style of Patrick Roy became the dominant style and the stand-up style of Parent and Plante became a relic of the NHL past. Parent is considered by many to be the last great stand-up goaltender.

On February 17, 1979, Parent suffered a career-ending eye injury in a game against the New York Rangers. An errant stick entered the right eye hole of his mask, causing permanent damage to his vision. After hospitalization, including the complete loss of sight for two weeks, Parent recovered and eventually regained sight, although not at the level required to resume his playing career. He retired at age 34, an age considered to be "still in athletic prime" for goaltenders. This incident, as well as the ending of Gerry Desjardins' career when a puck struck his eye in 1977, led many NHL goalies to switch from fibreglass facemasks toward the cage and helmet style, and resulted in many amateur and junior leagues banning fibreglass masks altogether, mandating the helmet/cage combo.

== Post-career ==
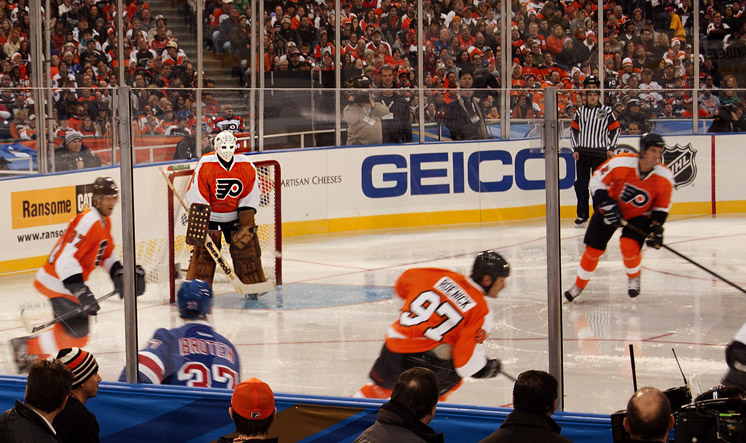
Bernie Parent's return to the ice for the 2012 Winter Classic Alumni Game.

After Parent's retirement the Flyers retired his sweater number (1) in his honor on October 11, 1979. He spent several years in the Flyers organization as goaltending coach, mentoring future Vezina-winning goalies Ron Hextall and the late Pelle Lindbergh, the latter of whom idolized Parent as a youngster in his native Sweden. Later, he was employed by the Flyers as Ambassador of Hockey and could be seen at Flyers home games on the concourse.

Unable to deal with the early loss of his career, Parent turned to alcohol and eventually ended up being helped by Alcoholics Anonymous. In 2007, he had been sober for 27 years.

In a 2007 interview with Philadelphia magazine, Parent sheepishly admitted he was watching the clock tick off the final seconds of the deciding Game Six against Boston in the 1974 Stanley Cup Final and that he was not paying attention to play when Bobby Orr sent a desperation length-of-the-ice shot toward the Flyers' goaltender. The puck went wide of the net with just 4 seconds to play. "If his shot is on net, it's a goal" Parent was quoted in the interview. The game was over seconds later and the Flyers had won their first of consecutive championships.

Parent remains one of the most popular Flyers from their two championship teams with hockey fans in Philadelphia.

Parent was inducted into the Hockey Hall of Fame in 1984. In 1998, he was ranked number 63 on The Hockey News' list of the 100 Greatest Hockey Players.

On December 7, 2011, Parent announced via Twitter that he would be playing in the 2012 NHL Winter Classic Alumni Game, to be held on December 31, 2011. Parent started in goal for the Flyers, playing five minutes and letting in no goals on five shots including a breakaway by New York Rangers legend Ron Duguay. He was later named the first star of the game.

== Personal life and death ==
Parent was a resident of Cherry Hill, New Jersey, and had a shore house in Wildwood Crest, where he lived most of the year. For seven months of every year, he lived on his 45-foot yacht named The French Connection.

In 2018, Parent was involved in a traffic collision that required multiple surgeries and left him in significant pain until his death. On September 21, 2025, he died in his sleep in Avalon, New Jersey, at the age of 80.

== Awards and achievements ==
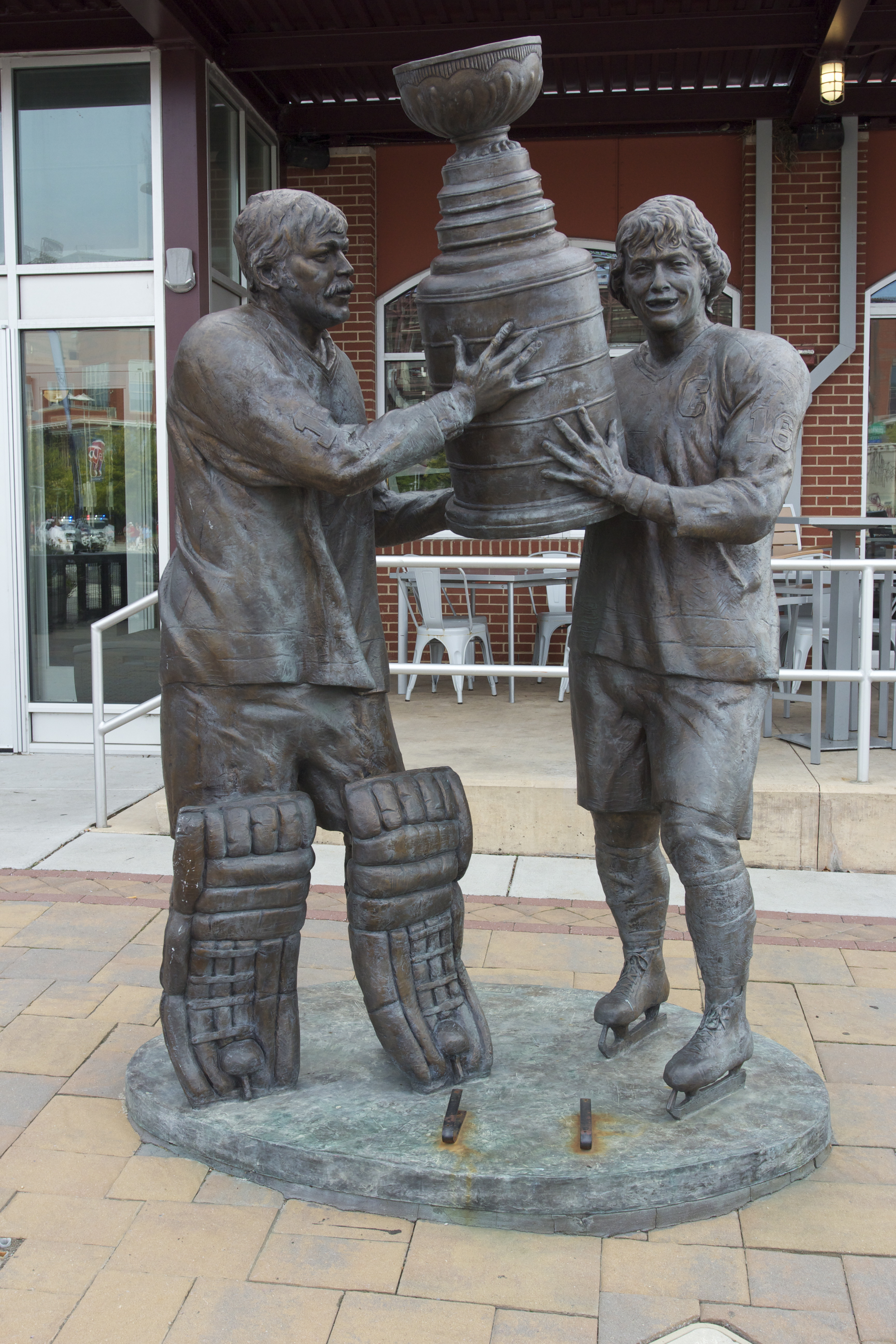
Parent and Bobby Clarke statue in South Philadelphia

- Memorial Cup championship in 1965.
- Selected to the WHA Second All-Star Team in 1973.
- Selected to the NHL First All-Star Team in 1974 and 1975.
- Conn Smythe Trophy winner in 1974 and 1975.
- Vezina Trophy winner in 1974 and 1975.
- Stanley Cup championships in 1974 and 1975.
- Played in 1969, 1970, 1974, 1975, and 1977 NHL All-Star Games.
- Class Guy Award winner in 1979.
- His #1 was retired by the Philadelphia Flyers on October 11, 1979, the second sweater number the Flyers have retired.
- Inducted into the Hockey Hall of Fame in 1984.
- In 1998, he was ranked number 63 on The Hockey News' list of the 100 Greatest Hockey Players.
- Inducted into the Philadelphia Sports Hall of Fame in 2004.

Parent co-wrote a book with Michele Paiva and Dean Smith titled "Journey Through Risk and Fear". The book touches upon Parent's trials and tribulations but mostly, how to overcome fear, face challenges, find purpose and obtain goals.

== Records ==
- Parent held the mark for most wins by a goaltender in a season (47), until surpassed by New Jersey Devils goaltender Martin Brodeur's 48 wins during the 2006–07 season. His 47 win season in 1973–74 is still the record for most regulation time wins in a single season. Parent did not have the benefit of overtime or shootouts or a longer season in his era.
- Parent was the fourth hockey player and third goalie to appear on the cover of Time magazine on February 24, 1975 (Lorne Chabot was first on February 11, 1935, and Dave Kerr on March 14, 1938, was the second).

== Career statistics ==
=== Regular season and playoffs ===
Bold indicates led league

| | | | Regular season | | | | | | | | | Playoffs |
| Season | Team | League | GP | W | L | T | MIN | GA | SO | GAA | SV% | GP | W | L | MIN | GA | SO | GAA | SV% |
|---|---|---|---|---|---|---|---|---|---|---|---|---|---|---|---|---|---|---|---|
| 1963–64 | Niagara Falls Flyers | OHA | 28 | — | — | — | 1,680 | 80 | 4 | 2.86 | — | 4 | 0 | 4 | 240 | 26 | 0 | 6.50 | — |
| 1964–65 | Niagara Falls Flyers | OHA | 34 | — | — | — | 2,004 | 86 | 2 | 2.58 | — | 8 | 6 | 2 | 480 | 15 | 1 | 1.86 | — |
| 1964–65 | Niagara Falls Flyers | M-Cup | — | — | — | — | — | — | — | — | — | 13 | 10 | 2 | 700 | 19 | 2 | 1.63 | — |
| 1965–66 | Boston Bruins | NHL | 39 | 11 | 20 | 3 | 2,083 | 128 | 1 | 3.69 | .894 | — | — | — | — | — | — | — | — |
| 1965–66 | Oklahoma City Blazers | CPHL | 3 | 1 | 1 | 1 | 180 | 11 | 0 | 3.67 | — | — | — | — | — | — | — | — | — |
| 1966–67 | Boston Bruins | NHL | 18 | 4 | 12 | 2 | 1,022 | 62 | 0 | 3.64 | .893 | — | — | — | — | — | — | — | — |
| 1966–67 | Oklahoma City Blazers | CPHL | 14 | 10 | 4 | 0 | 820 | 37 | 4 | 2.70 | — | — | — | — | — | — | — | — | — |
| 1967–68 | Philadelphia Flyers | NHL | 38 | 16 | 17 | 5 | 2,248 | 93 | 4 | 2.48 | .925 | 5 | 2 | 3 | 355 | 8 | 0 | 1.35 | .963 |
| 1968–69 | Philadelphia Flyers | NHL | 58 | 17 | 23 | **16** | 3,365 | 151 | 1 | 2.69 | .925 | 3 | 0 | 3 | 180 | 12 | 0 | 4.00 | .872 |
| 1969–70 | Philadelphia Flyers | NHL | 62 | 13 | 29 | **20** | 3,680 | 171 | 3 | 2.79 | .921 | — | — | — | — | — | — | — | — |
| 1970–71 | Philadelphia Flyers | NHL | 30 | 9 | 12 | 6 | 1,586 | 73 | 2 | 2.76 | .912 | — | — | — | — | — | — | — | — |
| 1970–71 | Toronto Maple Leafs | NHL | 18 | 7 | 7 | 3 | 1,040 | 46 | 0 | 2.65 | .916 | 4 | 2 | 2 | 235 | 9 | 0 | 2.30 | .922 |
| 1971–72 | Toronto Maple Leafs | NHL | 47 | 17 | 18 | 9 | 2,715 | 116 | 3 | 2.56 | .914 | 4 | 1 | 3 | 243 | 13 | 0 | 3.21 | .912 |
| 1972–73 | Philadelphia Blazers | WHA | 63 | **33** | 28 | 0 | 3,653 | **220** | 2 | 3.61 | .886 | 1 | 0 | 1 | 70 | 3 | 0 | 2.57 | .929 |
| 1973–74 | Philadelphia Flyers | NHL | **73** | **47** | 13 | 12 | **4,314** | 136 | **12** | **1.89** | .933 | 17 | 12 | 5 | 1,042 | 35 | 2 | 2.02 | .933 |
| 1974–75 | Philadelphia Flyers | NHL | 68 | **44** | 14 | 10 | 4,041 | 137 | **12** | **2.03** | .918 | 15 | 10 | 5 | 922 | 29 | 4 | 1.89 | .924 |
| 1975–76 | Philadelphia Flyers | NHL | 11 | 6 | 2 | 3 | 615 | 24 | 0 | 2.34 | .907 | 8 | 4 | 4 | 480 | 27 | 0 | 3.38 | .892 |
| 1976–77 | Philadelphia Flyers | NHL | 61 | 35 | 13 | **12** | 3,525 | 159 | 5 | 2.71 | .899 | 3 | 0 | 3 | 123 | 8 | 0 | 3.90 | .814 |
| 1977–78 | Philadelphia Flyers | NHL | 49 | 29 | 6 | 13 | 2,923 | 108 | **7** | 2.22 | .912 | 12 | 7 | 5 | 722 | 33 | 0 | 2.74 | .891 |
| 1978–79 | Philadelphia Flyers | NHL | 36 | 16 | 12 | 7 | 1,979 | 89 | 4 | 2.70 | .893 | — | — | — | — | — | — | — | — |
| WHA totals | | | 63 | 33 | 28 | 0 | 3,653 | 220 | 2 | 3.61 | .886 | 1 | 0 | 1 | 70 | 3 | 0 | 2.57 | .929 |
| NHL totals | | | 608 | 271 | 198 | 121 | 35,136 | 1,493 | 55 | 2.55 | .915 | 71 | 38 | 33 | 4,302 | 174 | 6 | 2.43 | .916 |

== See also ==
- List of NHL statistical leaders

Awards
| Preceded by Yvan Cournoyer | Winner of the Conn Smythe Trophy; 1974, 1975 | Succeeded by Reggie Leach |
| Preceded by Tony Esposito | Winner of the Vezina Trophy; 1974, 1975; With: Tony Esposito (1974) | Succeeded by Ken Dryden |
| Preceded by Joe Watson | Winner of the Class Guy Award; 1979 | Succeeded by André Dupont |
