= Marcel Paille =

Canadian ice hockey player

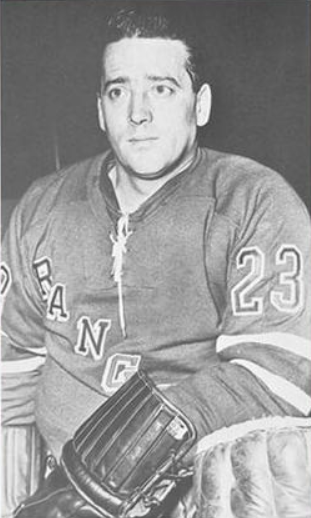
- Paille in 1964 photo
- Born: December 8, 1932 Shawinigan Falls, Quebec, Canada
- Died: October 7, 2002 (aged 69) Quebec City, Quebec, Canada
- Height: 5 ft 8 in (173 cm)
- Weight: 175 lb (79 kg; 12 st 7 lb)
- Position: Goaltender
- Caught: left
- Played for: New York Rangers; Philadelphia Blazers
- Playing career: 1957–1973

Joseph Marcel Rejean Paille (December 8, 1932 – October 7, 2002) was a Canadian ice hockey player. A goaltender, he played 107 games in the National Hockey League with the New York Rangers from 1957 to 1965, and 15 games in the World Hockey Association with the Philadelphia Blazers during the 1972–73 season. The rest of his career, which lasted from 1953 to 1974, was mainly spent in the minor American Hockey League (AHL) with the Providence Reds, and he set several AHL career playoff records. Paille was born in Shawinigan Falls, Quebec, and died of cancer in Quebec City.

== Career statistics ==
=== Regular season and playoffs ===
			Regular season									Playoffs
Season	Team	League	GP	W	L	T	MIN	GA	SO	GAA	SV%	GP	W	L	MIN	GA	SO	GAA	SV%
1949–50	Quebec Citadelles	QJHL	18	13	5	0	1080	60	3	3.33	—	15	9	6	926	50	0	3.24	—
1950–51	Quebec Citadelles	QJHL	46	33	13	0	2764	135	0	2.93	—	13	9	4	804	40	0	2.99	—
1950–51	Quebec Citadelles	M-Cup	—	—	—	—	—	—	—	—	—	10	6	4	600	40	2	4.00	—
1951–52	Quebec Citadelles	QJHL	—	—	—	—	—	—	—	—	—	14	7	7	844	38	1	2.70	—
1952–53	Quebec Citadelles	QJHL	48	30	15	3	2880	149	1	3.12	—	9	—	—	540	20	0	2.22	—
1952–53	Quebec Citadelles	M-Cup	—	—	—	—	—	—	—	—	—	8	4	4	480	39	0	4.88	—
1953–54	Matane Red Rockets	LSLHL	65	—	—	—	3900	182	5	2.80	—	—	—	—	—	—	—	—	—
1954–55	North Bay Trappers	NOHA	59	24	25	10	3540	228	1	3.86	—	13	—	—	780	40	1	3.08	—
1955–56	Chicoutimi Sagueneens	QSHL	61	30	26	4	3632	176	2	2.91	—	5	1	4	300	19	0	3.80	—
1956–57	Cleveland Barons	AHL	62	34	25	3	3750	200	7	3.20	—	12	8	4	767	31	0	2.43	—
1957–58	New York Rangers	NHL	33	11	15	7	1980	102	1	3.09	.908	—	—	—	—	—	—	—	—
1957–58	Providence Reds	AHL	41	19	20	2	2491	124	4	2.99	—	5	1	4	300	17	1	3.40	—
1958–59	New York Rangers	NHL	1	0	0	1	60	4	0	4.00	.875	—	—	—	—	—	—	—	—
1958–59	Buffalo Bisons	AHL	70	38	27	4	4200	195	3	2.79	—	11	6	5	664	27	1	2.44	—
1959–60	New York Rangers	NHL	17	6	9	2	1020	67	1	3.94	.867	—	—	—	—	—	—	—	—
1959–60	Springfield Indians	AHL	57	32	20	5	3420	183	2	3.21	—	10	8	2	628	31	0	2.96	—
1960–61	New York Rangers	NHL	4	1	2	1	240	16	0	4.00	.895	—	—	—	—	—	—	—	—
1960–61	Springfield Indians	AHL	67	46	20	1	4020	188	8	2.81	—	4	4	0	226	5	0	1.33	—
1961–62	New York Rangers	NHL	10	4	4	2	600	28	0	2.80	.912	—	—	—	—	—	—	—	—
1961–62	Springfield Indians	AHL	45	29	14	2	2770	115	2	2.49	—	11	8	3	758	21	2	1.66	—
1962–63	New York Rangers	NHL	3	0	1	2	180	10	0	3.33	.902	—	—	—	—	—	—	—	—
1962–63	Baltimore Clippers	AHL	41	18	20	3	2460	146	0	3.56	—	—	—	—	—	—	—	—	—
1963–64	Vancouver Canucks	WHL	70	26	41	3	4230	254	2	3.60	—	—	—	—	—	—	—	—	—
1963–64	Denver Invaders	WHL	—	—	—	—	—	—	—	—	—	3	1	2	194	12	0	3.71	—
1964–65	New York Rangers	NHL	39	10	21	7	2261	135	0	3.58	.893	—	—	—	—	—	—	—	—
1965–66	Providence Reds	AHL	60	17	40	2	3650	243	1	3.99	—	—	—	—	—	—	—	—	—
1966–67	Providence Reds	AHL	42	4	30	7	2471	188	0	4.56	—	—	—	—	—	—	—	—	—
1967–68	Providence Reds	AHL	54	23	23	8	3200	188	1	3.53	—	8	4	4	460	19	0	2.48	—
1968–69	Providence Reds	AHL	58	25	26	6	3321	202	2	3.65	—	9	5	4	544	28	0	3.09	—
1969–70	Providence Reds	AHL	62	20	30	10	3565	211	2	3.55	—	—	—	—	—	—	—	—	—
1970–71	Providence Reds	AHL	51	24	17	9	2789	167	1	3.59	—	10	4	6	599	32	1	3.21	—
1971–72	Providence Reds	AHL	34	15	16	2	1981	110	3	3.33	—	5	1	4	303	18	0	3.56	—
1972–73	Philadelphia Blazers	WHA	15	2	8	0	611	49	0	4.81	.870	—	—	—	—	—	—	—	—
1973–74	Richmond Robins	AHL	21	5	11	4	1201	85	0	4.24	—	2	0	2	119	9	0	4.54	—
AHL totals			765	349	339	68	45,289	2357	36	3.12	—	87	49	38	5368	238	5	2.66	—
WHA totals			15	2	8	0	611	49	0	4.81	.870	—	—	—	—	—	—	—	—
NHL totals			107	32	52	22	6341	362	2	3.43	.896	—	—	—	—	—	—	—	—

== Awards and achievements ==
- QJHL Second All-Star Team (1951, 1952, 1953)
- William Northey Trophy (Top Rookie - QHL) (1956)
- AHL Second All-Star Team (1957, 1960)
- AHL First All-Star Team (1959, 1961, 1962)
- Harry "Hap" Holmes Memorial Award (fewest goals against - AHL) (1961, 1962)
- WHL Second All-Star Team (1964)

== Records ==
- Most AHL Games Played by a Goaltender, Career - 765
- Most AHL Playoff Games Played by a Goaltender, All-Time - 87
- Most AHL Playoff Wins by a Goaltender, All-Time - 49
- Longest AHL Playoff Shutout Streak - 207:27
- Most AHL Playoff Minutes Played, Career - 5,368
