= Derek Sanderson =

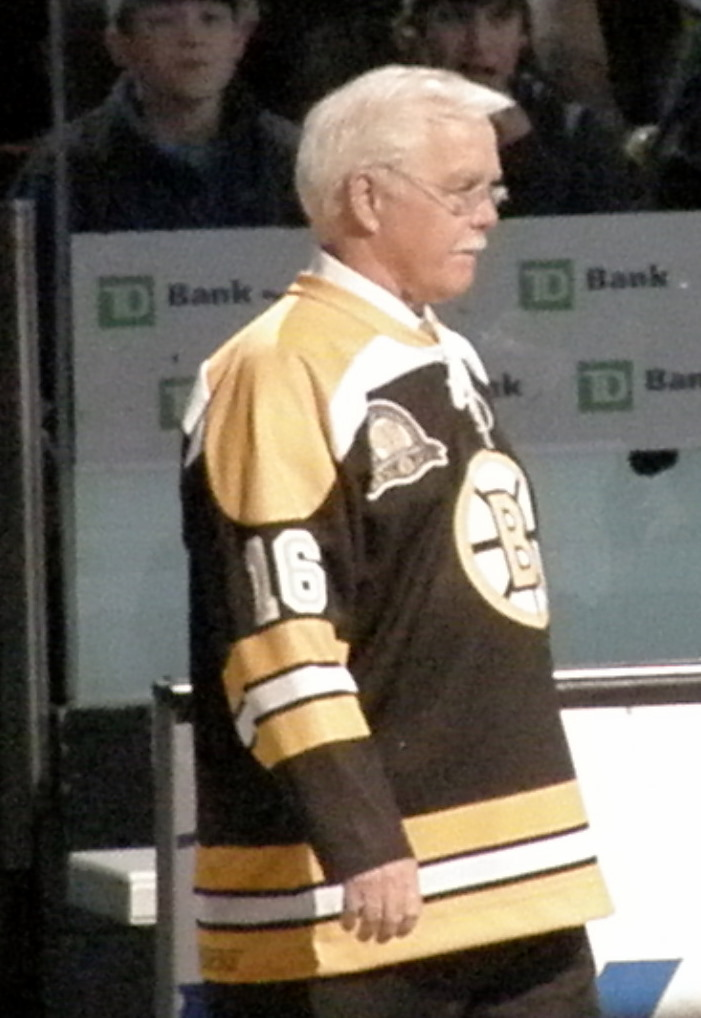
- Sanderson in 2010
- Born: June 16, 1946 (age 80) Niagara Falls, Ontario, Canada
- Height: 6 ft 1 in (185 cm)
- Weight: 200 lb (91 kg; 14 st 4 lb)
- Position: Centre
- Shot: Left
- Played for: Boston Bruins; Philadelphia Blazers; New York Rangers; St. Louis Blues; Vancouver Canucks; Pittsburgh Penguins
- Playing career: 1965–1978
- Website: sandersonhockey.com

Derek Michael Sanderson (born June 16, 1946), nicknamed "Turk", is a Canadian former professional ice hockey centre and two-time Stanley Cup champion who helped transform the culture of the professional athlete in the 1970s era. He set up the overtime goal scored by Boston Bruins teammate Bobby Orr that clinched the 1970 Stanley Cup Final, widely considered to be the greatest goal in National Hockey League history. Over 13 NHL seasons he amassed 202 goals, 250 assists, 911 penalty minutes and a plus-141 rating in 598 games with five teams.

For a six-month period, Sanderson was the highest-paid athlete in sports history. On August 4, 1972, he left the Bruins to sign a $2.625-million deal with the Philadelphia Blazers of the rival World Hockey Association. However, Sanderson sustained a back injury three weeks into the 1972–73 season, and he played only eight games with the team before the two sides agreed to a $1-million buyout of his contract.

A master of the menacing sweep check, which would soon become his trademark, Sanderson scored his 32nd career short-handed goal in the 1975-76 campaign to surpass Toronto Maple Leafs center Dave Keon as the all-time league leader. He owned the record for eight seasons. Nearly half a century after his last Bruins appearance, Sanderson still owns the team record for most career shorthanded goals (six) in the playoffs, a mark that he shares with Ed Westfall, a longtime teammate. Through the 2021-22 campaign, his 24 short-handed tallies in the regular season ranked third behind Brad Marchand and Rick Middleton in club history.

== Early years ==
Born in Niagara Falls, Ontario, Sanderson was the son of Canadian Army Private Harold A. Sanderson, and Caroline Hall Gillespie of Dysart, Scotland. His older sister Karen was born in 1944 while their father was serving in France. In his early youth, Sanderson took to hockey, skating countless hours on a scaled-down version of an NHL rink, which his father built and maintained while his mother served hot chocolate during breaks in the action. The rink spanned two backyards of small cookie-cutter houses on lots provided at modest prices to servicemen such as Harold upon their return home.

== Playing career ==
Sanderson played junior hockey in his hometown with the Niagara Falls Flyers of the Ontario Hockey Association. His time with the Flyers saw him being named to the Second All-Star Team in 1965–66, to the First All-Star Team in 1966–67 and winning the Eddie Powers Memorial Trophy as the top scorer in the OHA also in 1966–67. In 1964–65, Sanderson helped the Flyers reach the Memorial Cup Final where they beat the Edmonton Oil Kings in five games. After spending four years in the OHA, Sanderson turned pro by signing with the Boston Bruins of the National Hockey League in 1965–66, and made his professional debut that season by playing two games with the Bruins. Sanderson also played two games in the CPHL with the Oklahoma City Blazers in 1965–66, recording one goal. During the postseason he recorded 4 assists helping the team win the Adams Cup.

=== Boston Bruins (1968–1972) ===
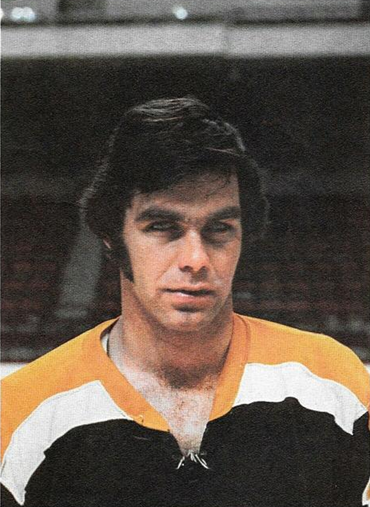
1970 photo of Sanderson for Boston Bruins

After brief stints with the Bruins in the two previous seasons, Sanderson earned a permanent roster spot in the 1967–68 campaign. The 21-year-old scored 24 goals and 49 points in 71 games. He also had 98 penalty minutes, establishing himself as something of a "tough guy". Sanderson was awarded the Calder Memorial Trophy as the Rookie of the Year, an honor that his teammate Orr had claimed the previous year. It remains the only time in Bruins history that they had consecutive Calder winners.

Although Sanderson had been an elite scorer in junior hockey, the Bruins already boasted the most potent offense in hockey when he joined the club. Instead, head coach Harry Sinden had a different vision for him, one as a valuable multi-purpose center who could neutralize the top center men in the league, dominate the face-off dot, help kill penalties at a high rate, unnerve opponents with physical if not chippy play and contribute at the offensive end on a regular basis. Sanderson would become a fixture on the third line, often paired with left wing Wayne Carleton or Don Marcotte and right wing Ed Westfall throughout his Bruins career. In particular, Westfall and Sanderson developed an uncommon chemistry that allowed them to become one of the most accomplished penalty-killing tandems in league history. Sanderson also became one of the first NHL centers to focus on and excel in winning faceoffs.

During his second season with the Bruins in 1968–69 Sanderson appeared in 61 games scoring 26 and 22 against finishing with 48 points one less than the year prior. During a game vs. the Toronto Maples Leafs on March 16, 1969, Sanderson had his best individual game performance where he scored a hatrick and 3 assists for a 6-point game in a Bruins 11–3 victory. During the postseason Sanderson scored 8 goals and 2 assists in 9 games however the Bruins were eliminated by the Montreal Canadiens in the second round.

Due to an injury Sanderson only appeared in 50 games for the Bruins during the 1969-70 season, where he scored 41 points (18 goals, 23 assists). During the postseason Sanderson appeared in all 14 playoff games scoring 5 goals and 4 assists. After their series victory over the Rangers followed by a sweep of the Chicago Blackhawks in the 1969–70 playoffs, the Bruins faced the St. Louis Blues in the Stanley Cup Final. With the Bruins ahead in the series 3–0, game four went into overtime with the teams deadlocked at 3-all. Forty seconds into the extra period, Sanderson controlled the puck behind the Blues goal line, at which point defenseman Bobby Orr broke in from near the blue line. His short pass found its way to Orr, who fired a short wrist shot past goaltender Glenn Hall before he went airborne, clinching the first Bruins Stanley Cup in 29 years. Following the victory Sanderson gave his Stanley Cup ring to his father for filling a promise he made to him when he was 12 years old.

In 2017, on the 100th anniversary of the league, fans voted the so-called Flying Goal as the greatest in its history. It also turned out to be the signature moment for both players in their careers.

In 1970-71, Sanderson scored a NHL career best 29 goals along with 34 assists, helping the Bruins set records for most victories (57) and points (121). The Bruins went on to win the Prince of Wales Trophy as East Division regular season champions, however they were defeated by the Montreal Canadiens in the first round of the playoffs. Following a disappointing end to the previous season the Bruins finished with the leagues best record the following year as Sanderson scored 25 goals and 33 assists in 78 games. On January 16, 1972, he scored 3 goals and 2 assists in a Bruins 9–2 victory over the Detroit Red Wings. During the postseason Sanderson appeared in 11 games scoring 1 goals and 1 assist as the Bruins defeated the New York Rangers to win their second Stanley Cup in 3 years.

Sanderson averaged more than 24 goals over his first five seasons, the best of which was the 1970-71 campaign, when he had career highs of 29 goals, 63 points and a plus-39 rating in 71 games. The Bruins captured consecutive East Division titles in the 1970–71 and 1971–72 seasons, and won the Stanley Cup in 1971–72 against the New York Rangers, its second in three seasons.

=== Philadelphia Blazers (1972–1973) ===
In the summer of 1972, Sanderson signed what was then the richest contract in professional sports history. The Philadelphia Blazers of the new World Hockey Association signed Sanderson to a five-year, $2.65 million contract that made him the highest-paid pro athlete in the world at the time. He received $600,000 in cash as part of the agreement, an offer that the Bruins declined to match. The remainder of the money was to be spread over 10 years.

On November 1, in a game at Cleveland, Sanderson suffered a back injury when he slipped on a piece of debris on the ice. When he was fit to return weeks later, club management insisted that he remain inactive. It was widely speculated that it had hoped to prod Sanderson to bolt the team and void his lucrative deal but his contract was bought out for $800,000 after the season. Sanderson only appeared in 8 total games for the Blazers scoring 3 goals and 3 assists.

== Later career ==
After Sanderson and the Blazers parted ways, he returned to the Bruins for two seasons but suited up for only 54 games. During the 1972-73 season he scored 15 points and in 1973-74 he scored 20. He was demoted to the Boston Braves of the American Hockey League for three games then traded to the rival New York Rangers.

By that time, Sanderson had developed avascular necrosis. Steroids were prescribed to alleviate the problem, but when they dried out his hip sockets, it only grew worse in nature. The pain in his hips grew so intense, he began to take barbiturates as a sleep aid.

Sanderson bounced from team to team, never being able to stay with a team for more than two full seasons. After playing with the Rangers and recording 50 points in 75 games, he was traded to the St. Louis Blues eight games into the next season for a first-round draft pick. In St. Louis, Sanderson was a point per game player setting career highs in assists and points scored in a season with 43 assists and 67 points during the 1975-76 season, but recurring knee and alcohol problems prompted Blues management to trade him in 1976–77 to the Vancouver Canucks in return for cash.

Sanderson made a bad first impression with Canucks management before a regular-season game had been played. In the pre-season, he was involved in a brawl at a local strip club that left him in a hospital, where tests showed an extremely high level of alcohol as well as evidence of cocaine, sleeping pills, Seconal and Valium in his system. Sanderson scored 16 points in 16 games with the club before he was sent to the minors because of disciplinary reasons. As was the case in St. Louis, the front office grew impatient with his personal and health issues and released him after the season.

The Pittsburgh Penguins signed Sanderson as a free agent in 1977–78. He played 13 games with the Penguins and eight more in the minors before his release. When no takers stepped forward before the next season, he retired from the game.

Sanderson was known for his two-way play and penalty killing. Checking, face-offs, and scoring while shorthanded set him apart. Sanderson has since been named to both ESPN's and QG's coolest athletes of all time lists.

== The Mod New Face of Hockey ==
Sanderson also received publicity for his numerous female companions and lavish ways, which included a Rolls-Royce car and circular bed. Named by Cosmopolitan as one of the sexiest men in America, he was the subject of gossip columns, and a frequent guest on television talk shows.

By the late 1960s, Sanderson had become known for more than just his hockey prowess. Similar to what New York Jets quarterback Joe Namath was to football, he represented the mod new face of hockey. In June, 1969, Namath called to gauge Sanderson's financial interest in a bar similar to Bachelors III, which the quarterback had owned on New York City's Upper East Side before concerned league commissioner Pete Rozelle ordered him to cut ties or retire from football, only this one in Boston. Not one to turn down the spotlight and its many perks, Sanderson opened Bachelors III along with co-partners Joe Cimino and Jim Colclough, a one-time Boston Patriots wide receiver.

As related by Sanderson in his book years later Crossing The Line: The Outrageous Story of a Hockey Original:

That's how I learned how to pick up the tab. Unfortunately, I ended up buying the world a drink. Every night was sensational fun. There were lineups around the block. When the Bruins were in town, we were there until two in the morning every night. All the waitresses were great looking. It was a beauty contest. They all wore V-neck sweaters to show some cleavage and hot pants with high boots. I was thinking, 'This is unbelievable! And I'm the boss!'

Convinced about its financial potential, Cimino convinced Sanderson to open their own establishment in Boston one year later. Taking inspiration from F. Scott Fitzgerald's The Great Gatsby with the name, Daisy Buchanan's opened its doors in September 1970 at the corner of Newbury and Fairfield Street. Soon, Daisy's became the hottest night spot in Boston, a haven for professional athletes, young singles and curiosity-seekers alike. Bruin teammates Bobby Orr, Phil Esposito, Gerry Cheevers and Eddie Johnston were regulars there, but the omnipresent Sanderson served as the main attraction and promoter, usually behind the bar, cigarette in mouth and drink(s) in hand.

Concerned about the negative publicity generated by some of the club's less-than-reputable patrons, Sanderson eventually relinquished his interests in a venture that had been transformed from a financial "goldmine" to a personal headache.

== Personal life, health, and sportscasting career ==
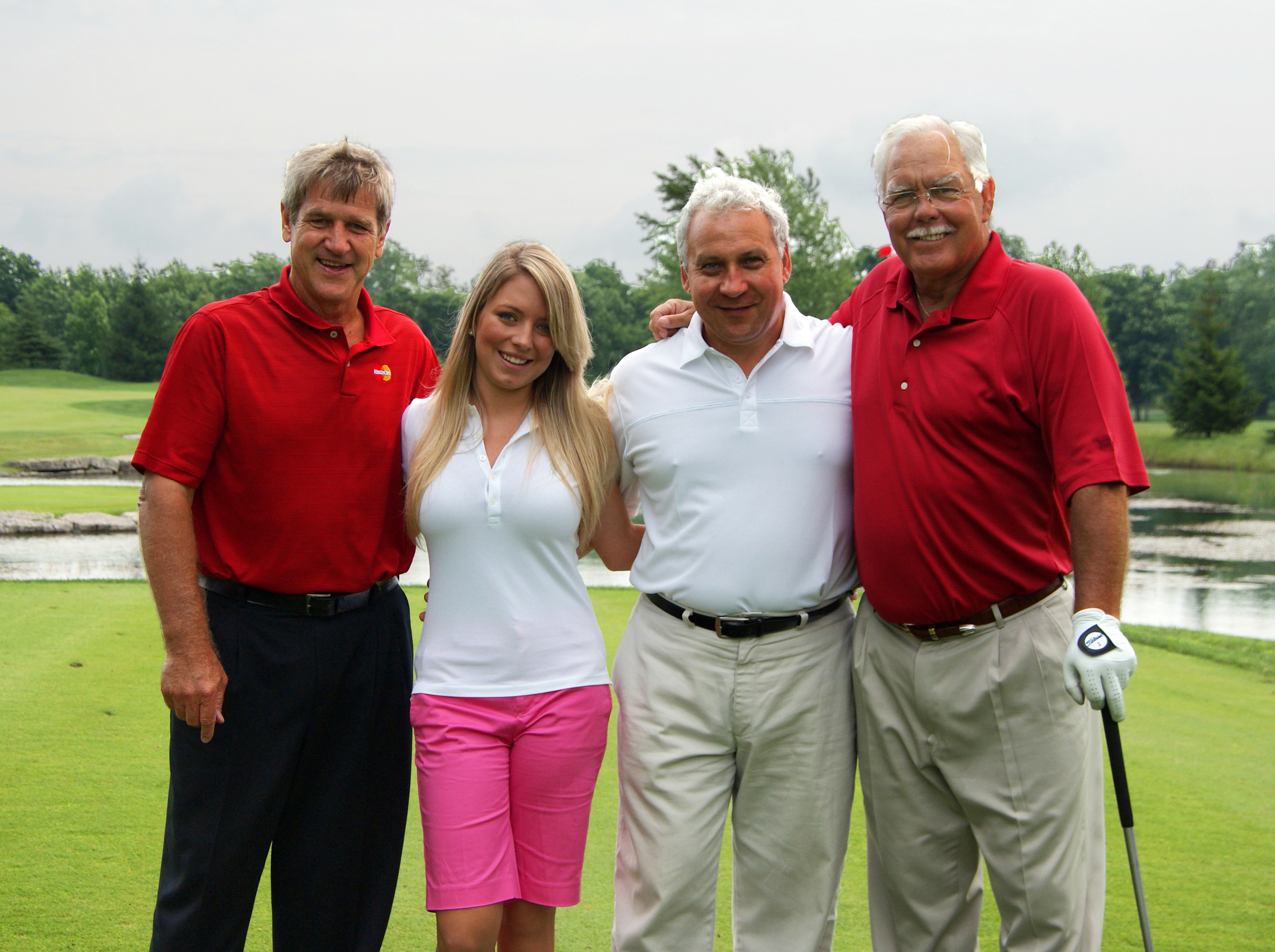
Sanderson on a golf course in 2010 with his former teammate Bobby Orr who is on the far left

In April 1979, Sanderson married Rhonda Rapport, a former Playboy Bunny from Chicago. Their son, Scott Leslie Sanderson, died at birth on October 4, 1981, in Niagara Falls. According to a story in the Toronto Star by Ellie Tesher on March 21, 1982, the couple separated soon thereafter. Rhonda Sanderson's detailed questions about their son's death led to an investigation by the College of Physicians and Surgeons of Ontario.

During his career, Sanderson made several bad business investments and lost millions of dollars in the process. His partying lifestyle caught up with him by the time his career ended and he was found sleeping in an inebriated state on a bench in Central Park. By his estimate, he survived 10 hip surgeries, prostate cancer, and two heart attacks.

In late 1978, Bobby Orr found his ex-teammate to be in dire straits in Chicago and checked him into a local hospital. Doctors informed Orr that his former teammate was an alcoholic and drug addict. Orr then checked Sanderson into rehab in 1979 where he went on to beat his addiction.

In his second autobiography Sanderson wrote on his battle with addiction stating "Through family, friendships and faith - discovering there is something stronger than all of us - I was able to reconstruct my life. The people who really cared gave me the strength to get back on my feet, and I am eternally grateful."

Following his recovery Sanderson then went on to become a sports broadcaster. He spent 10 years with New England Sports Network and WSBK-TV with play-by-play announcer Fred Cusick calling Bruins game. Wanting to make sure that other hockey players would not follow his path, Sanderson organized The Professionals Group at State Street Global Advisors, where he was Director of The Sports Group that provided professional financial advice to athletes in the 1990s.

In 1984 Sanderson met his second wife Nancy Gillis (the daughter of Don Gillis) when she sought him out to help on a project for Boston's City CableVision. The couple have two sons. Sanderson stated that meeting Nancy gave him a reason to "turn his life around."

In 2012, Sanderson became the managing director of The Sports Group, in Boston. His team worked with athletes and high-net-worth individuals, but he is not currently listed on the company's website. His second autobiography, Crossing the Line: The Outrageous Story of a Hockey Original, written with Kevin Shea, was released in October 2012. His first autobiography, I've Got To Be Me, written with Stan Fischler, had been published in 1970. In September 2013, Sanderson received the Hockey Legacy Award from The Sports Museum at TD Garden. Sanderson remains active in Boston area talking part in charity events and autograph signings.

In 2019, Sanderson was honored as an honorary fan banner captain alongside Bobby Orr during game five of the Stanley Cup Final at TD Garden, he was then honored once again during the team's centennial celebrations in 2024.

== Television and film ==
Throughout his playing career Sanderson made appearances on the Joe Namath Show, Johnny Carson Tonight, The Merv Griffin Show, 90 minutes live, The Mike Douglas Show and briefly hosted his own Boston based talk show Everybody's Talkin in the early 1970s.

He also had some brief acting roles appearing as in movies such as Winter Comes Early, A Knife for the Ladies and appeared in the opening credits of an episode of the show Banacek.

In 2015 NBC Sports Boston produced Center of Attention The Unreal Life of Derek Sanderson, an hour long documentary that chronicles Sanderson's rise, decline, and eventual redemption, also highlighting his broader influence on professional sports culture.

== Awards and achievements ==
- Retired as the NHL career leader in shorthanded goals (currently 11th all time)
- Memorial Cup champion in 1965.
- Adams Cup champion in 1966
- Selected to the OHA-Jr. Second All-Star Team in 1966.
- Selected to the OHA-Jr. First All-Star Team 1967.
- Eddie Powers Memorial Trophy (Top scorer in OHA) winner in 1967.
- Calder Memorial Trophy winner in 1968.
- Stanley Cup champion in 1970 and 1972.
- Seventh Player Award winner in 1972.
- Eddie Shore Award, Presented by the Gallery Gods in 1972.
- Named One of the Top 100 Best Bruins Players of all Time.

== Career statistics ==
=== Regular season and playoffs ===
			Regular season					Playoffs
Season	Team	League	GP	G	A	Pts	PIM	GP	G	A	Pts	PIM
1962–63	Niagara Falls Flyers	OHA	2	0	0	0	10	1	0	0	0	0
1962–63	Niagara Falls Flyers	M-Cup	—	—	—	—	—	1	0	0	0	0
1963–64	Niagara Falls Flyers	OHA	42	12	15	27	42	4	0	1	1	0
1964–65	Niagara Falls Flyers	OHA	55	19	46	65	128	11	9	8	17	26
1965–66	Boston Bruins	NHL	2	0	0	0	0	—	—	—	—	—
1965–66	Niagara Falls Flyers	OHA	48	33	43	76	238	6	6	0	6	72
1965–66	Oklahoma City Blazers	CPHL	2	1	0	1	0	4	0	4	4	5
1965–66	Niagara Falls Flyers	M-Cup	—	—	—	—	—	11	7	6	13	78
1966–67	Niagara Falls Flyers	OHA	47	41	60	101	193	13	8	17	25	70
1966–67	Oklahoma City Blazers	CPHL	—	—	—	—	—	2	0	0	0	0
1967–68	Boston Bruins	NHL	71	24	25	49	98	4	0	2	2	9
1968–69	Boston Bruins	NHL	61	26	22	48	146	9	8	2	10	36
1969–70	Boston Bruins	NHL	50	18	23	41	118	14	5	4	9	72
1970–71	Boston Bruins	NHL	71	29	34	63	130	7	2	1	3	13
1971–72	Boston Bruins	NHL	78	25	33	58	108	11	1	1	2	44
1972–73	Philadelphia Blazers	WHA	8	3	3	6	69	—	—	—	—	—
1972–73	Boston Bruins	NHL	25	5	10	15	38	5	1	2	3	13
1973–74	Boston Bruins	NHL	29	8	12	20	48	—	—	—	—	—
1973–74	Boston Braves	AHL	3	4	3	7	2	—	—	—	—	—
1974–75	New York Rangers	NHL	75	25	25	50	106	3	0	0	0	0
1975–76	New York Rangers	NHL	8	0	0	0	4	—	—	—	—	—
1975–76	St. Louis Blues	NHL	65	24	43	67	59	3	1	0	1	0
1976–77	Kansas City Blues	CHL	8	4	3	7	6	—	—	—	—	—
1976–77	Vancouver Canucks	NHL	16	7	9	16	30	—	—	—	—	—
1977–78	Pittsburgh Penguins	NHL	13	3	1	4	0	—	—	—	—	—
1977–78	Tulsa Oilers	CHL	4	0	0	0	0	—	—	—	—	—
1977–78	Kansas City Red Wings	CHL	4	1	3	4	0	—	—	—	—	—
NHL totals			598	202	250	452	911	56	18	12	30	187
WHA totals			8	3	3	6	69	—	—	—	—	—

Preceded by Bobby Orr	Winner of the Calder Memorial Trophy; 1968	Succeeded by Danny Grant
