= Vancouver Blazers =

Defunct World Hockey Association franchise

- City: Vancouver, British Columbia
- League: WHA
- Founded: 1972
- Operated: 1973-1975
- Home arena: Pacific Coliseum
- Colours: Yellow, burnt orange

Franchise history
- 1972: Miami Screaming Eagles
- 1972–1973: Philadelphia Blazers
- 1973–1975: Vancouver Blazers
- 1975–1976: Calgary Cowboys

The Vancouver Blazers were a professional ice hockey team that played in the World Hockey Association from 1973 to 1975. The Blazers played at the Pacific Coliseum in Vancouver, sharing the facility with the Vancouver Canucks of the National Hockey League. The Blazers were owned by local businessman Jim Pattison. The franchise moved to Vancouver after a single season in Philadelphia. Unable to establish a strong fan base in Vancouver, the team was moved again in 1975 to become the Calgary Cowboys.

== History ==
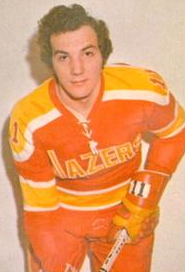
Danny Lawson played the most games in franchise history with 378, where he scored 212 goals to go with 197 assists for a total of 409 points.

The Blazers were one of the founding members of the World Hockey Association. Originally the team, called the Miami Screaming Eagles, was to be based in Miami, Florida, but due to financial problems and a lack of a suitable arena, the franchise was moved to Philadelphia, Pennsylvania and debuted as the Philadelphia Blazers. After only one season in Philadelphia, the team relocated to Vancouver, British Columbia and became the Vancouver Blazers in 1973–74. After two seasons, the team was again relocated to Calgary, Alberta as the Calgary Cowboys for 1975–76. Two years later, the franchise folded.

== Vancouver Blazers ==
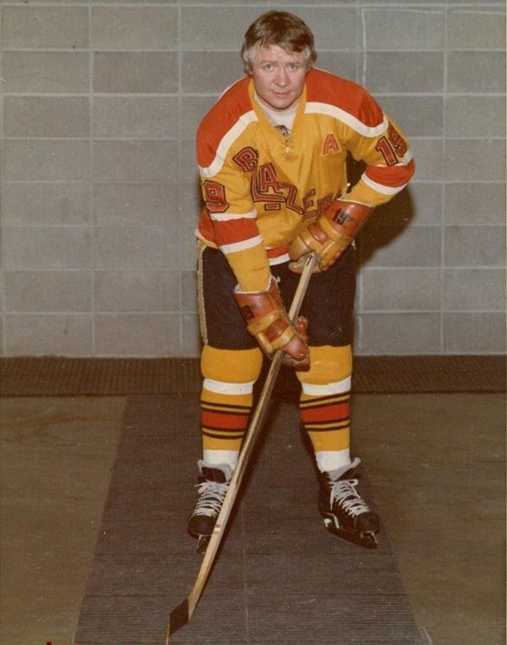
John McKenzie (pictured in 1974) played 179 of his 477 games (7th most in WHA history for the Blazers.

After the 1972–73 WHA season ended, the Philadelphia Blazers' owners sold the team to Jim Pattison who moved the team north of the border to Vancouver, British Columbia where it was named Vancouver Blazers.

Pattison knew that in order to compete with the Vancouver Canucks of the NHL, who shared the same arena, he needed to attract a major star to the team, as Andre Lacroix, who had led the league in scoring the previous year, left to join the New York Golden Blades, while the team's (and league's) highest-paid player, Derek Sanderson, had been forced out at the end of the season in a major embarrassment to the team and league. Pattison tried to sign Boston star Phil Esposito, offering him $2.5 million over five years. Esposito decided to stay with the Bruins for less money.

The team performed poorly in their first year, finishing with a record of 27-50-1; despite this, Vancouver was such a strong hockey town that the Blazers actually led the WHA in attendance, drawing 9,356 a night, more than 50% above the average of the other eleven clubs in the league. The next season, 1974–75, the club improved to only two games below .500, only to see attendance slip to 8,014 a game, sixth in the 14-team WHA.

The Blazers' (and WHA's) efforts to attract fans were certainly not helped by the machinations of the NHL, which was aggressively expanding to try to keep its rival out of premium arenas and markets. Prior to the WHA's arrival, the Canucks had consistently finished well out of playoff contention. However, after the Blazers' first season in the Pacific Coliseum, the NHL not only expanded again but also dissolved the Canucks' tough East Division and placed the team in the much weaker Smythe Division.

The Canucks won the new Smythe Division, and consistently played to at or near capacity at Pacific Coliseum while the Blazers struggled to fill the building to half capacity. Under such circumstances, it was evident that Vancouver was not large enough to support both the NHL and WHA; thus after only two seasons on the west coast the team made its third franchise shift in three years, this time to Calgary, Alberta, where they were renamed Calgary Cowboys. The Cowboys would be the WHA's second attempt in Calgary, as the Calgary Broncos were slated to start playing there for the inaugural WHA season. However, after Broncos' owner Bob Brownridge died, the franchise was placed in Cleveland instead.

The last active Vancouver Blazers player was Pat Price who retired in the NHL during the 1987-88 NHL season.

== Season-by-season record ==
See 1973–74 Vancouver Blazers season
See 1974–75 Vancouver Blazers season

Note: GP = Games played, W = Wins, L = Losses, T = Ties, Pts = Points, GF = Goals for, GA = Goals against, PIM = Penalties in minutes

Season	Team Name	GP	W	L	T	PTS	GF	GA	PIM	Finish	Playoffs
1973–74	Vancouver Blazers	78	27	50	1	55	278	345	1047	5th, Western	Did not qualify
1974–75	Vancouver Blazers	78	37	39	2	76	256	270	1075	4th, Canadian	Did not qualify
	Franchise totals	395	174	207	14	362	1381	1498	5278

== See also ==
- List of Vancouver Blazers players
- List of ice hockey teams in British Columbia
