= Philadelphia Blazers =

Former ice hockey team of the World Hockey Association

- City: Philadelphia, Pennsylvania
- Home arena: Philadelphia Civic Center
- Colors: Yellow, burnt orange
- Media: WKBS-TV; WIBG

Franchise history
- 1972 (did not play): Miami Screaming Eagles
- 1972–1973: Philadelphia Blazers
- 1973–1975: Vancouver Blazers
- 1975–1976: Calgary Cowboys

The Philadelphia Blazers were an ice hockey franchise in the World Hockey Association (WHA) for the 1972–73 WHA season based in Philadelphia. The team's home ice was the Philadelphia Convention Hall and Civic Center.

The franchise was originally intended to be based in Miami, Florida, and called the Screaming Eagles, but due to money problems and a lack of a suitable arena, the franchise instead moved to Philadelphia. After only one season in Philadelphia, the team relocated to Vancouver for the start of the 1973–74 WHA season and became the Vancouver Blazers. Two years later the franchise moved again, this time to Calgary where it was called the Calgary Cowboys. In 1977, the franchise folded.

== Composition of the roster ==
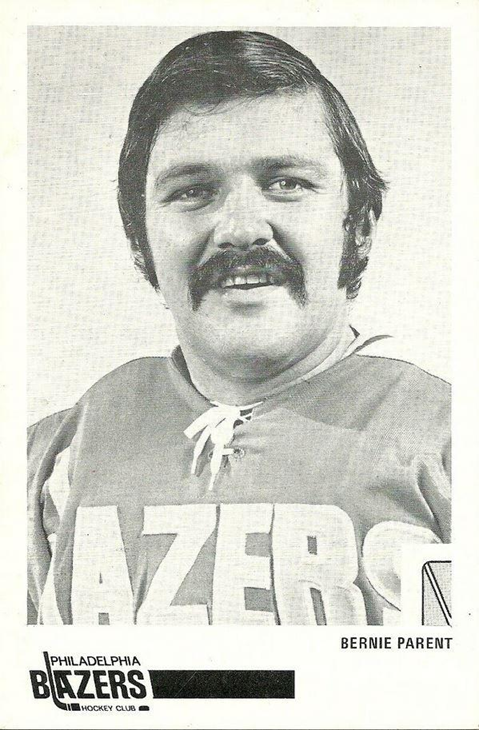
1972-73 card of Bernie Parent for Blazers

In June 1972, businessmen Bernard Brown and James Cooper were granted the rights to the Miami Screaming Eagles, along with the players who were under contract with the team (including goaltender Bernie Parent), from businessman Herb Martin. Brown and Cooper then moved the franchise to Philadelphia and renamed it the Blazers. They also signed Derek Sanderson to a five-year contract for $2.6 million, which at the time was the highest salary ever paid to a professional sports player. The signing produced a great deal of publicity, but it was controversial as well, since many hockey pundits felt that Sanderson's prior career and ability did not warrant such a salary.

== Regular season ==
The Blazers had high hopes going into the inaugural WHA season with such stars as Parent, Sanderson, and John McKenzie, who was named the team's player-coach. However, their hopes were soon dashed as McKenzie suffered an injury in a pre-season game, and Parent and Sanderson also suffered injuries. The team's first home game on October 13, 1972, was also a disaster: when the Zamboni drove onto the playing surface after arriving late at the arena, the improperly-made ice could not support its weight and cracked open, forcing the game to be rescheduled.

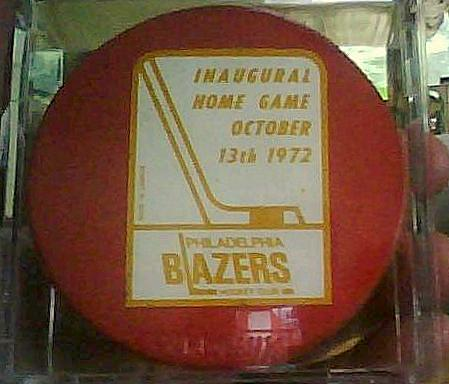
Puck given out as souvenir at the inaugural Blazers game, which was canceled due to ice problems. Many fans threw the pucks onto the ice in frustration after a belated announcement that the game would not be played.

The team lost 16 of its first 20 games before Parent and McKenzie returned. During this time, McKenzie was replaced as coach by Phil Watson. Also, Sanderson left the team; after only eight games (in which he scored three goals and three assists) and considerable controversy, the owners paid him $500,000 to void the remainder of his contract, and he returned to the Boston Bruins.

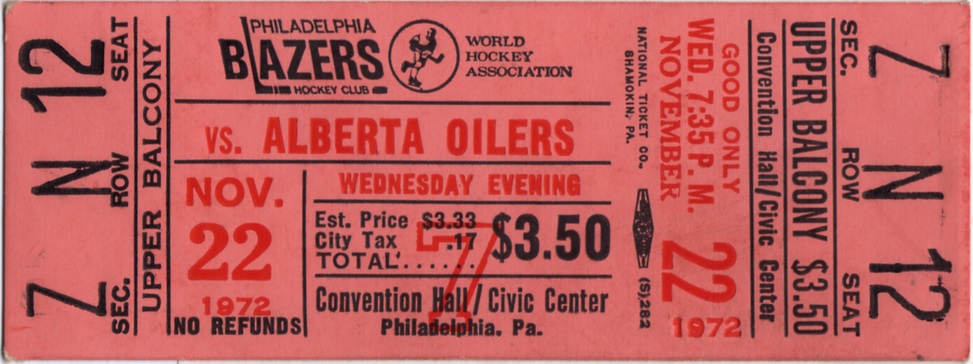
Ticket from the November 22, 1972, game between the Blazers and the Alberta Oilers

== Playoffs ==
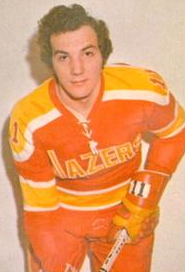
Danny Lawson was among the bright stars for the Blazers in their time in Philadelphia.

The Blazers improved as the season went on. Andre Lacroix led the league in points, and Danny Lawson scored 61 goals; they would prove to be two of the WHA's brightest stars, and Lacroix would become the league's all-time leading career scorer. Coupled with Parent's goaltending, the team made the playoffs with a record of 38 wins and 40 losses. However, Parent left the team after the first game of the playoffs (a 3–2 loss to the Cleveland Crusaders), leaving netminding duties in the hands of backup Marcel Paille, who had not played in the NHL for almost eight years and was then over 40 years old, and 20-year-old Yves Archambault, whose total experience above juniors was 30 games in the Eastern Hockey League. The Blazers were quickly swept, lasting only the minimum four games. Parent's agent, Howard J. Casper, claimed that money deposited into an escrow account to guarantee his full multi-year contract had been withdrawn by the team and that Parent would not return until the money was repaid; he also alleged that Parent was having trouble getting his regular salary and that the team was not paying medical expenses for him. Parent never rejoined the Blazers, returning to the Philadelphia Flyers the following season.

== Relocation ==
Despite making a decent account of themselves on the ice, the Blazers were no match at the box office for the Flyers of the established National Hockey League (NHL), who played at the then-state-of-the-art Spectrum. While competing with an NHL team would likely have been difficult in the best of circumstances, for the Blazers matters were made worse as their debut coincided with the Flyers becoming competitive on the ice, posting their first winning record before ultimately winning consecutive Stanley Cups in the two following seasons. With no reasonable hope of the Blazers overcoming poor attendance at the Civic Center, which averaged less than 50% of capacity, Brown and Cooper sold the Blazers to Jim Pattison after only one season. Pattison moved the team to Vancouver.

The last active Blazers player in major professional hockey was Dave Hutchinson, who retired after the 1983–84 NHL season. The last active Blazer at any level was Ron Plumb, who played in England until 1986.

== Season-by-season record ==
See 1972–73 Philadelphia Blazers season

Note: GP = Games played, W = Wins, L = Losses, T = Ties, Pts = Points, GF = Goals for, GA = Goals against, PIM = Penalties in minutes

Season	Team Name	GP	W	L	T	PTS	GF	GA	PIM	Finish	Playoffs
1972–73	Philadelphia Blazers	78	38	40	0	76	288	305	1260	3rd, Eastern	Lost Quarterfinals (Crusaders)
	Franchise totals	395	174	207	14	362	1381	1498	5278

== See also ==
- Calgary Cowboys (WHA)
- Miami Screaming Eagles
- Vancouver Blazers
- List of WHA seasons

== Additional sources ==
- Calgary Cowboys
- Unofficial Home of the Philadelphia Blazers
- The Internet Hockey Database: Philadelphia Blazers
