= List of Phoenix Roadrunners (WHA) players =

This is a list of players who played at least one game for the Phoenix Roadrunners of the World Hockey Association from 1974–75 to 1976–77.

== B ==
Bob Barlow, Serge Beaudoin, Wendell Bennett, Don Borgeson, Jim Boyd, Duane Bray,

== C ==
Jim Clarke, Cam Connor, Michel Cormier,

== D ==
Blair Davidson, Barry Dean,

== E ==
Grant Erickson,

== F ==
Robbie Ftorek,

== G ==
Dave Gorman, John Gray,

== H ==
Del Hall, Hugh Harris, Clay Hebenton, Andre Hinse, Mike Hobin, Frank Hughes, John Hughes, Ron Huston,

== K ==
Murray Keogan, Gary Kurt,

== L ==
Garry Lariviere, Bob Liddington,

== M ==
Al McLeod, Peter McNamee, John Migneault, Lauri Mononen, Bob Mowat,

== N ==
Rick Newell, Jim Niekamp, Jack Norris,

== O ==
Gerry Odrowski,

== P ==
Jan Popiel,

== R ==
Pekka Rautakallio, Seppo Repo, Jerry Rollins,

== S ==
Mike Sleep, Dennis Sobchuk, Gene Sobchuk, Mike Stevens,

== T ==
Juhani Tamminen,

== V ==
Gary Veneruzzo,

== Z ==
Howie Young,
