= 1976–77 Edmonton Oilers season =

WHA hockey team season

1976–77 Edmonton Oilers
- Division: 4th Western
- 1976–77 record: 34–43–4
- Home record: 24–15–3
- Road record: 10–28–1
- Goals for: 243
- Goals against: 304

Team information
- General manager: Bep Guidolin
- Coach: Bep Guidolin (25–36–2); Glen Sather (9–7–2)
- Captain: Glen Sather (Oct–Mar); Vacant (Mar–Apr)
- Alternate captains: Doug Barrie; Ron Busniuk
- Arena: Northlands Coliseum
- Minor league affiliate: Baltimore Clippers (SHL)

Team leaders
- Goals: Bill Flett (34)
- Assists: Bryan Campbell (42)
- Points: Bill Flett (54); Bryan Campbell (54)
- Penalty minutes: Frank Beaton (274)
- Plus/minus: Bill Flett (+7)
- Wins: Ken Broderick (18)
- Goals against average: Dave Dryden (3.26)

The 1976–77 Edmonton Oilers season was the Oilers' fifth season of operation. The Oilers placed fourth to qualify for the playoffs, losing in the first round.

== Regular season ==
=== Final standings ===
Western Division
	GP	W	L	T	GF	GA	PTS
Houston Aeros	80	50	24	6	320	241	106
Winnipeg Jets	80	46	32	2	366	291	94
San Diego Mariners	81	40	37	4	284	283	85
Edmonton Oilers	81	34	43	4	243	304	72
Calgary Cowboys	81	31	43	7	252	296	69
Phoenix Roadrunners	80	28	48	4	281	383	60

== Schedule and results ==
1976–77 regular season
October

Game	Result	Date	Score	Opponent	Record
1	W	October 8, 1976	2–0	New England Whalers (1976–77)	1–0–0
2	L	October 15, 1976	1–6	Winnipeg Jets (1976–77)	1–1–0
3	W	October 17, 1976	7–2	Indianapolis Racers (1976–77)	2–1–0
4	W	October 19, 1976	5–4 OT	Phoenix Roadrunners (1976–77)	3–1–0
5	L	October 24, 1976	3–5	Phoenix Roadrunners (1976–77)	3–2–0
6	L	October 26, 1976	1–3	@ Houston Aeros (1976–77)	3–3–0
7	W	October 28, 1976	4–3 OT	@ Birmingham Bulls (1976–77)	4–3–0
8	L	October 29, 1976	3–11	@ Winnipeg Jets (1976–77)	4–4–0
9	L	October 31, 1976	0–4	Houston Aeros (1976–77)	4–5–0

November

Game	Result	Date	Score	Opponent	Record
10	W	November 3, 1976	4–2	Minnesota Fighting Saints (1976–77)	5–5–0
11	L	November 4, 1976	2–4	@ Calgary Cowboys (1976–77)	5–6–0
12	L	November 5, 1976	3–4	New England Whalers (1976–77)	5–7–0
13	L	November 7, 1976	2–5	@ Winnipeg Jets (1976–77)	5–8–0
14	L	November 10, 1976	2–4	@ Cincinnati Stingers (1976–77)	5–9–0
15	W	November 13, 1976	3–2	@ Birmingham Bulls (1976–77)	6–9–0
16	L	November 16, 1976	2–5	@ Phoenix Roadrunners (1976–77)	6–10–0
17	L	November 17, 1976	2–4	@ San Diego Mariners (1976–77)	6–11–0
18	W	November 19, 1976	4–3 OT	Cincinnati Stingers (1976–77)	7–11–0
19	W	November 21, 1976	6–5	Quebec Nordiques (1976–77)	8–11–0
20	L	November 23, 1976	3–5	@ Houston Aeros (1976–77)	8–12–0
21	L	November 24, 1976	2–4	@ San Diego Mariners (1976–77)	8–13–0
22	L	November 26, 1976	2–4	@ Phoenix Roadrunners (1976–77)	8–14–0
23	W	November 28, 1976	4–0	San Diego Mariners (1976–77)	9–14–0
24	W	November 30, 1976	3–2 OT	Phoenix Roadrunners (1976–77)	10–14–0

December

Game	Result	Date	Score	Opponent	Record
25	W	December 2, 1976	4–3	@ Birmingham Bulls (1976–77)	11–14–0
26	T	December 3, 1976	0–0	@ Houston Aeros (1976–77)	11–14–1
27	L	December 4, 1976	3–5	@ Indianapolis Racers (1976–77)	11–15–1
28	L	December 5, 1976	1–5	@ Minnesota Fighting Saints (1976–77)	11–16–1
29	W	December 7, 1976	4–2	@ Quebec Nordiques (1976–77)	12–16–1
30	L	December 11, 1976	0–3	@ Calgary Cowboys (1976–77)	12–17–1
31	W	December 12, 1976	5–3	Birmingham Bulls (1976–77)	13–17–1
32	L	December 14, 1976	1–6	San Diego Mariners (1976–77)	13–18–1
33	L	December 16, 1976	0–3	@ San Diego Mariners (1976–77)	13–19–1
34	W	December 17, 1976	1–0	@ Phoenix Roadrunners (1976–77)	14–19–1
35	W	December 19, 1976	4–2	Cincinnati Stingers (1976–77)	15–19–1
36	W	December 21, 1976	4–1	Calgary Cowboys (1976–77)	16–19–1
37	L	December 28, 1976	2–3	Quebec Nordiques (1976–77)	16–20–1

January

Game	Result	Date	Score	Opponent	Record
38	L	January 1, 1977	1–5	@ Calgary Cowboys (1976–77)	16–21–1
39	L	January 4, 1977	3–5	Houston Aeros (1976–77)	16–22–1
40	W	January 7, 1977	4–1	Calgary Cowboys (1976–77)	17–22–1
41	L	January 8, 1977	0–5	@ Minnesota Fighting Saints (1976–77)	17–23–1
42	W	January 9, 1977	5–3	Indianapolis Racers (1976–77)	18–23–1
43	W	January 14, 1977	5–3	@ New England Whalers (1976–77)	19–23–1
44	L	January 15, 1977	3–6	@ Indianapolis Racers (1976–77)	19–24–1
45	L	January 16, 1977	1–3	@ Houston Aeros (1976–77)	19–25–1
46	L	January 20, 1977	1–5	@ San Diego Mariners (1976–77)	19–26–1
47	L	January 22, 1977	1–4	@ Phoenix Roadrunners (1976–77)	19–27–1
48	W	January 23, 1977	9–2	Phoenix Roadrunners (1976–77)	20–27–1
49	W	January 26, 1977	5–4 OT	@ Quebec Nordiques (1976–77)	21–27–1
50	L	January 28, 1977	1–4	Houston Aeros (1976–77)	21–28–1
51	T	January 30, 1977	1–1	Calgary Cowboys (1976–77)	21–28–2

February

Game	Result	Date	Score	Opponent	Record
52	L	February 1, 1977	1–11	Winnipeg Jets (1976–77)	21–29–2
53	W	February 6, 1977	4–2	San Diego Mariners (1976–77)	22–29–2
54	L	February 8, 1977	5–6	San Diego Mariners (1976–77)	22–30–2
55	L	February 11, 1977	1–3	@ Calgary Cowboys (1976–77)	22–31–2
56	W	February 13, 1977	5–2	Calgary Cowboys (1976–77)	23–31–2
57	L	February 15, 1977	4–7	Cincinnati Stingers (1976–77)	23–32–2
58	W	February 18, 1977	3–2	Winnipeg Jets (1976–77)	24–32–2
59	L	February 20, 1977	2–4	@ Winnipeg Jets (1976–77)	24–33–2
60	W	February 22, 1977	4–3	New England Whalers (1976–77)	25–33–2
61	L	February 25, 1977	2–3 OT	Indianapolis Racers (1976–77)	25–34–2
62	L	February 27, 1977	0–4	Birmingham Bulls (1976–77)	25–35–2

March

Game	Result	Date	Score	Opponent	Record
63	L	March 1, 1977	4–5	Quebec Nordiques (1976–77)	25–36–2
64	W	March 3, 1977	5–4	Winnipeg Jets (1976–77)	26–36–2
65	W	March 6, 1977	5–2	Birmingham Bulls (1976–77)	27–36–2
66	L	March 8, 1977	3–5	@ Houston Aeros (1976–77)	27–37–2
67	L	March 9, 1977	3–5	@ Cincinnati Stingers (1976–77)	27–38–2
68	W	March 10, 1977	4–3	@ Indianapolis Racers (1976–77)	28–38–2
69	T	March 12, 1977	3–3	@ Quebec Nordiques (1976–77)	28–38–3
70	L	March 13, 1977	3–9	@ Winnipeg Jets (1976–77)	28–39–3
71	L	March 15, 1977	0–7	@ Winnipeg Jets (1976–77)	28–40–3
72	W	March 17, 1977	4–3	Winnipeg Jets (1976–77)	29–40–3
73	L	March 22, 1977	3–8	@ Winnipeg Jets (1976–77)	29–41–3
74	W	March 24, 1977	5–4	@ New England Whalers (1976–77)	30–41–3
75	W	March 25, 1977	4–3 OT	@ Cincinnati Stingers (1976–77)	31–41–3
76	L	March 27, 1977	2–5	@ New England Whalers (1976–77)	31–42–3
77	W	March 30, 1977	8–0	Houston Aeros (1976–77)	32–42–3

April

Game	Result	Date	Score	Opponent	Record
78	L	April 1, 1977	1–3	Calgary Cowboys (1976–77)	32–43–3
79	T	April 2, 1977	4–4	@ Calgary Cowboys (1976–77)	32–43–4
80	W	April 4, 1977	6–2	Winnipeg Jets (1976–77)	33–43–4
81	W	April 6, 1977	6–4	Birmingham Bulls (1976–77)	34–43–4

Legend: Win (2 points) Loss (0 points) Tie (1 point)

== Playoffs ==
1977 Avco Cup playoffs
Division Semifinals vs. (W1) Houston Aeros – Aeros win 4–1

Game	Date	Visitor	Score	Home	Series
1	April 13	Edmonton Oilers	3–4 OT	Houston Aeros	0–1
2	April 15	Edmonton Oilers	2–6	Houston Aeros	0–2
3	April 17	Houston Aeros	2–7	Edmonton Oilers	1–2
4	April 20	Houston Aeros	4–1	Edmonton Oilers	1–3
5	April 22	Edmonton Oilers	3–4	Houston Aeros	1–4

Legend: Win Loss

== Player statistics ==
Regular season
Scoring

Player	Pos	GP	G	A	Pts	PIM	+/-	PPG	SHG	GWG
Bill Flett	RW	48	34	20	54	20	7	7	0	0
Bryan Campbell	C	66	12	42	54	18	−10	0	1	0
Glen Sather	LW	81	19	34	53	77	−17	2	0	0
Al Hamilton	D	81	8	37	45	60	−19	3	0	0
Norm Ullman	C	67	16	27	43	28	−23	4	0	0
Rusty Patenaude	RW	73	25	16	41	57	−23	8	0	0
Gavin Kirk	C	52	8	28	36	16	−4	3	0	0
Rick Morris	LW	79	18	17	35	76	−1	1	0	0
Wayne Connelly	C	38	13	15	28	18	0	4	0	0
Barry Wilkins	D	51	4	24	28	75	−7	0	0	0
Doug Barrie	D	70	8	19	27	92	−4	2	0	0
Brett Callighen	C	29	9	16	25	48	6	2	0	0
Tim Sheehy	RW	28	15	8	23	4	−7	4	0	0
Dave Langevin	D	77	7	16	23	94	−16	2	0	0
Gregg Boddy	D	46	1	17	18	41	−1	1	0	0
Randy Rota	C/LW	40	9	6	15	8	−10	1	0	0
Bob Russell	C	57	7	6	13	41	−10	0	0	0
Frank Beaton	LW	68	4	9	13	274	−12	0	0	0
Butch Williams	RW	29	3	10	13	16	−9	1	0	0
Claude St. Sauveur	C	15	5	7	12	2	−1	0	0	0
Gene Peacosh	LW	11	5	4	9	14	2	2	0	0
Bob Nevin	RW	13	3	2	5	0	−8	1	0	0
Tom Simpson	RW	15	3	2	5	16	2	0	0	0
Pete Laframboise	LW/C	17	0	5	5	12	−6	0	0	0
Ron Busniuk	RW	29	2	2	4	83	0	0	0	0
Barry Merrell	C	10	1	3	4	0	−2	0	0	0
Glenn Patrick	D	23	0	4	4	62	−10	0	0	0
Larry Hornung	D	21	2	1	3	0	−6	0	0	0
Ken Baird	D	2	1	2	3	0	2	0	0	0
Ken Broderick	G	40	0	3	3	2	0	0	0	0
Mike Antonovich	C	7	1	1	2	0	−3	0	0	0
Bill Butters	D	7	0	2	2	17	−2	0	0	0
Dave Dryden	G	24	0	2	2	0	0	0	0	0
Dennis Patterson	D	23	0	2	2	2	−18	0	0	0
Ted Scharf	RW	5	0	2	2	14	−1	0	0	0
Barry Long	D	2	0	1	1	2	−4	0	0	0
Danny Arndt	LW	1	0	0	0	0	−2	0	0	0
Joe Fortunato	LW	1	0	0	0	0	0	0	0	0
Jean-Louis Levasseur	G	21	0	0	0	2	0	0	0	0
Peter Morris	LW	3	0	0	0	2	−2	0	0	0
Bill Prentice	D	3	0	0	0	2	2	0	0	0
Paul Stewart	LW/D	2	0	0	0	2	0	0	0	0

Goaltending

Player	MIN	GP	W	L	T	GA	GAA	SO
Ken Broderick	2301	40	18	18	1	134	3.49	4
Dave Dryden	1416	24	10	13	0	77	3.26	1
Jean-Louis Levasseur	1213	21	6	12	3	88	4.35	0
Team:	4930	81	34	43	4	299	3.64	5

Playoffs
Scoring

Player	Pos	GP	G	A	Pts	PIM	PPG	SHG	GWG
Brett Callighen	C	5	4	1	5	7	0	0	1
Randy Rota	C/LW	5	3	2	5	0	0	0	0
Bryan Campbell	C	5	3	1	4	0	0	0	0
Al Hamilton	D	5	0	4	4	4	0	0	0
Dave Langevin	D	5	2	1	3	9	0	0	0
Gregg Boddy	D	4	1	2	3	14	0	0	0
Norm Ullman	C	5	0	3	3	0	0	0	0
Glen Sather	LW	5	1	1	2	2	0	0	0
Frank Beaton	LW	5	0	2	2	21	0	0	0
Ron Busniuk	RW	5	0	2	2	37	0	0	0
Bill Flett	RW	5	0	2	2	2	0	0	0
Gavin Kirk	C	5	1	0	1	4	0	0	0
Claude St. Sauveur	C	5	1	0	1	0	0	0	0
Wayne Connelly	C	5	0	1	1	0	0	0	0
Rick Morris	LW	5	0	1	1	4	0	0	0
Barry Wilkins	D	4	0	1	1	2	0	0	0
Doug Barrie	D	4	0	0	0	0	0	0	0
Ken Broderick	G	3	0	0	0	0	0	0	0
Jean-Louis Levasseur	G	2	0	0	0	2	0	0	0
Rusty Patenaude	RW	2	0	0	0	8	0	0	0
Glenn Patrick	D	2	0	0	0	0	0	0	0
Bob Russell	C	1	0	0	0	0	0	0	0

Goaltending

Player	MIN	GP	W	L	GA	GAA	SO
Ken Broderick	179	3	1	2	10	3.35	0
Jean-Louis Levasseur	133	2	0	2	10	4.51	0
Team:	312	5	1	4	20	3.85	0

Note: Pos = Position; GP = Games played; G = Goals; A = Assists; Pts = Points; +/- = plus/minus; PIM = Penalty minutes; PPG = Power-play goals; SHG = Short-handed goals; GWG = Game-winning goals
MIN = Minutes played; W = Wins; L = Losses; T = Ties; GA = Goals-against; GAA = Goals-against average; SO = Shutouts;

== Transactions ==
=== Trades ===
Date	To Edmonton Oilers	Traded to	Traded for
July 1976	Cash	Cincinnati Stingers	Gilles Marotte
September 1976	Cal Sandbeck	Calgary Cowboys	Dave Kryskow
September 13, 1976	Barry Wilkins	Minnesota Fighting Saints	Bob Paradise
October 26, 1976	Future considerations	Winnipeg Jets	Barry Long
November 2, 1976	Frank Beaton	Cincinnati Stingers	Cash
November 5, 1976	Bryan Campbell	Indianapolis Racers	Gene Peacosh
November 21, 1976	Randy Rota	Colorado Rockies (NHL)	Cash
November 25, 1976	Gregg Boddy	San Diego Mariners	Larry Hornung
December 5, 1976	Gavin Kirk; Tom Simpson	Birmingham Bulls	Tim Sheehy
December 10, 1976	Bill Flett	Atlanta Flames (NHL)	Cash
January 12, 1977	Bill Prentice	Quebec Nordiques	2nd-round pick in 1977 - John Anderson
January 14, 1977	Dave Keon; John McKenzie; Mike Antonovich; Bill Butters; Jack Carlson; Jean-Louis Levasseur; Steve Carlson	Minnesota Fighting Saints	($140,000) Cash
January 18, 1977	Danny Arndt; Dave Debol; 1st-round pick in 1977 - Mike Crombeen; Cash	New England Whalers	Dave Keon; John McKenzie; Dave Dryden; Jack Carlson; Steve Carlson
February 4, 1977	Ron Busniuk; Brett Callighen	New England Whalers	Mike Antonovich; Bill Butters

=== Players acquired ===
Date	Player	Former team	Term
May 26, 1976	Dave Langevin	Minnesota Fighting Saints	
May 26, 1976	Bob Paradise	Minnesota Fighting Saints	
May 26, 1976	John Rothstein	Minnesota Fighting Saints	
May 26, 1976	Craig Sarner	Minnesota Fighting Saints	
July 1, 1976	Larry Hornung	Winnipeg Jets	
July 1, 1976	Barry Merrell	Rochester Americans (AHL)	
September 1976	Butch Williams	California Golden Seals (NHL)	
September 1, 1976	Ken Broderick	San Diego Mariners	2-year
September 1, 1976	Tony Featherstone	Toronto Toros	
September 7, 1976	Don Borgeson	Calgary Cowboys	
September 12, 1976	Pete Laframboise	Los Angeles Sharks	
October 8, 1976	Dennis Patterson	Kansas City Scouts (NHL)	1-year
October 8, 1976	Gene Peacosh	San Diego Mariners	1-year
October 22, 1976	Bob Nevin	Birmingham Bulls	1-year
November 3, 1976	Ted Scharf	Indianapolis Racers	
November 3, 1976	Paul Stewart	Broome Dusters (NAHL)	
February 18, 1977	Glenn Patrick	Cleveland Crusaders	

=== Players lost ===
Date	Player	New team
1976	Eddie Joyal	Retired
1976	Doug Kerslake	Retired
1976	Skip Krake	Retired
1976	Bill Laing	Retired
1976	Dwayne Pentland	Houston Aeros
July 1, 1976	Jack Carlson	Calgary Cowboys
July 1, 1976	Jeff Carlson	Minnesota Fighting Saints
September 1976	Paul Hurley	Calgary Cowboys
September 13, 1976	Wayne Muloin	Hershey Bears (AHL)
October 12, 1976	Tom Gilmore	Released
October 12, 1976	Murray Kennett	Released
October 12, 1976	Bruce MacGregor	Released
October 12, 1976	Bob McAneeley	Released
October 12, 1976	Ted McAneeley	Released
October 12, 1976	Ray Reeson	Released
October 12, 1976	Dan Spring	Released
October 17, 1976	Tony Featherstone	Retired
October 21, 1976	Ken Baird	Released
November 1976	Ken Baird	Calgary Cowboys
December 3, 1976	Ted McAneeley	Spokane Flyers (WIHL)
January 1977	Wayne Carleton	Birmingham Bulls
April 22, 1977	Glen Sather	Retired

=== Waivers ===
Date	Player	Team
January 1, 1977	Wayne Connelly	from Calgary Cowboys
January 1, 1977	Claude St. Sauveur	from Calgary Cowboys

=== Signings ===
Date	Player	Term
August 30, 1976	Norm Ullman	1-year
September 3, 1976	Barry Wilkins	1-year
September 7, 1976	Don Borgeson	
September 7, 1976	Barry Merrell	
September 7, 1976	Rick Morris	1-year
September 8, 1976	Larry Hornung	
September 8, 1976	Dave Langevin	
September 10, 1976	Glen Sather	
January 27, 1977	Jean-Louis Levasseur	3-year
March 8, 1977	Gord Blumenschein	

== Draft picks ==
Edmonton's draft picks at the 1976 WHA Amateur Draft.

Round	#	Player	Nationality	College/Junior/Club team (League)
1	1	Blair Chapman (RW)	Canada	Saskatoon Blades (WCHL)
1	6	Bernie Federko (C)	Canada	Saskatoon Blades (WCHL)
3	28	Harold Phillipoff (W)	Canada	New Westminster Bruins (WCHL)
3	30	Drew Callander (C)	Canada	Regina Pats (WCHL)
4	36	Brian Sutter (LW)	Canada	Lethbridge Broncos (WCHL)
5	48	Yvon Vautour (F)	Canada	Laval National (QMJHL)
6	60	Tim Williams (D)	Canada	Victoria Cougars (WCHL)
7	72	Gord Blumenschein (C)	Canada	Winnipeg Clubs (WCHL)
8	84	John Tavella (LW)	Canada	Sault Ste. Marie Greyhounds (OHA)
9	95	Al Dumba (RW)	Canada	Regina Pats (WCHL)
10	106	Jim Bedard (G)	Canada	Sudbury Wolves (OHA)

== See also ==
- 1976–77 WHA season
