= 1976–77 Calgary Cowboys season =

World Hockey Association team season

1976–77 Calgary Cowboys
- Division: 5th Western
- 1976–77 record: 31–43–7
- Home record: 26–12–2
- Road record: 5–31–5
- Goals for: 252
- Goals against: 296

Team information
- Coach: Joe Crozier
- Captain: Peter Driscoll
- Alternate captains: Ron Chipperfield; Chris Evans; Paul Terbenche
- Arena: Stampede Corral

Team leaders
- Goals: Lynn Powis (30)
- Assists: Warren Miller (32)
- Points: Lynn Powis (60)
- Penalty minutes: Peter Driscoll (120)
- Wins: Don McLeod (25)
- Goals against average: Don McLeod (3.40)

The 1976–77 Calgary Cowboys season was the Calgary Cowboys' fifth and final season of operation in the World Hockey Association, and their second season in Calgary. The Cowboys failed to make the playoffs and folded after the season.

== Regular season ==
=== Final standings ===
Western Division
	GP	W	L	T	GF	GA	PTS
Houston Aeros	80	50	24	6	320	241	106
Winnipeg Jets	80	46	32	2	366	291	94
San Diego Mariners	81	40	37	4	284	283	85
Edmonton Oilers	81	34	43	4	243	304	72
Calgary Cowboys	81	31	43	7	252	296	69
Phoenix Roadrunners	80	28	48	4	281	383	60

== Schedule and results ==
1976–77 regular season
October

Game	Result	Date	Score	Opponent	Record
1	L	October 8, 1976	1–4	@ Winnipeg Jets (1976–77)	0–1–0
2	L	October 9, 1976	2–5	@ Quebec Nordiques (1976–77)	0–2–0
3	L	October 12, 1976	2–6	@ Birmingham Bulls (1976–77)	0–3–0
4	L	October 13, 1976	1–2	@ Houston Aeros (1976–77)	0–4–0
5	L	October 16, 1976	2–4	@ San Diego Mariners (1976–77)	0–5–0
6	L	October 21, 1976	2–4	Quebec Nordiques (1976–77)	0–6–0
7	T	October 22, 1976	2–2	@ Minnesota Fighting Saints (1976–77)	0–6–1
8	W	October 24, 1976	6–0	San Diego Mariners (1976–77)	1–6–1
9	W	October 26, 1976	9–3	Birmingham Bulls (1976–77)	2–6–1
10	W	October 30, 1976	6–4	Houston Aeros (1976–77)	3–6–1

November

Game	Result	Date	Score	Opponent	Record
11	W	November 2, 1976	4–3	Minnesota Fighting Saints (1976–77)	4–6–1
12	W	November 4, 1976	4–2	Edmonton Oilers (1976–77)	5–6–1
13	W	November 7, 1976	4–2	New England Whalers (1976–77)	6–6–1
14	W	November 11, 1976	7–5	Winnipeg Jets (1976–77)	7–6–1
15	L	November 14, 1976	0–2	Winnipeg Jets (1976–77)	7–7–1
16	L	November 16, 1976	2–4	@ Houston Aeros (1976–77)	7–8–1
17	W	November 18, 1976	2–1 OT	@ Phoenix Roadrunners (1976–77)	8–8–1
18	W	November 19, 1976	4–1	Quebec Nordiques (1976–77)	9–8–1
19	L	November 21, 1976	1–5	@ Minnesota Fighting Saints (1976–77)	9–9–1
20	L	November 23, 1976	1–3	@ Birmingham Bulls (1976–77)	9–10–1
21	T	November 24, 1976	3–3	@ Phoenix Roadrunners (1976–77)	9–10–2
22	L	November 27, 1976	0–2	San Diego Mariners (1976–77)	9–11–2

December

Game	Result	Date	Score	Opponent	Record
23	L	December 1, 1976	4–8	@ New England Whalers (1976–77)	9–12–2
24	L	December 2, 1976	1–2	@ Indianapolis Racers (1976–77)	9–13–2
25	L	December 3, 1976	4–6	@ Cincinnati Stingers (1976–77)	9–14–2
26	W	December 5, 1976	6–0	Phoenix Roadrunners (1976–77)	10–14–2
27	L	December 8, 1976	2–4	Winnipeg Jets (1976–77)	10–15–2
28	L	December 10, 1976	2–4	@ Minnesota Fighting Saints (1976–77)	10–16–2
29	W	December 11, 1976	3–0	Edmonton Oilers (1976–77)	11–16–2
30	W	December 18, 1976	4–2	Quebec Nordiques (1976–77)	12–16–2
31	L	December 21, 1976	1–4	@ Edmonton Oilers (1976–77)	12–17–2
32	W	December 23, 1976	2–1	Minnesota Fighting Saints (1976–77)	13–17–2
33	W	December 26, 1976	6–3	Cincinnati Stingers (1976–77)	14–17–2

January

Game	Result	Date	Score	Opponent	Record
34	W	January 1, 1977	5–1	Edmonton Oilers (1976–77)	15–17–2
35	L	January 5, 1977	3–4	Houston Aeros (1976–77)	15–18–2
36	L	January 7, 1977	1–4	@ Edmonton Oilers (1976–77)	15–19–2
37	W	January 8, 1977	4–3	Indianapolis Racers (1976–77)	16–19–2
38	L	January 11, 1977	3–4 OT	Indianapolis Racers (1976–77)	16–20–2
39	L	January 14, 1977	3–5	Winnipeg Jets (1976–77)	16–21–2
40	W	January 15, 1977	5–3	@ San Diego Mariners (1976–77)	17–21–2
41	W	January 16, 1977	5–4	@ Phoenix Roadrunners (1976–77)	18–21–2
42	T	January 21, 1977	1–1	@ Indianapolis Racers (1976–77)	18–21–3
43	L	January 22, 1977	3–5	@ Quebec Nordiques (1976–77)	18–22–3
44	L	January 23, 1977	5–10	@ Winnipeg Jets (1976–77)	18–23–3
45	W	January 25, 1977	7–3	Phoenix Roadrunners (1976–77)	19–23–3
46	L	January 29, 1977	4–6	Houston Aeros (1976–77)	19–24–3
47	T	January 30, 1977	1–1	@ Edmonton Oilers (1976–77)	19–24–4

February

Game	Result	Date	Score	Opponent	Record
48	L	February 1, 1977	1–6	@ Houston Aeros (1976–77)	19–25–4
49	L	February 2, 1977	4–6	@ San Diego Mariners (1976–77)	19–26–4
50	W	February 5, 1977	4–1	@ Phoenix Roadrunners (1976–77)	20–26–4
51	L	February 6, 1977	4–6	@ Winnipeg Jets (1976–77)	20–27–4
52	W	February 11, 1977	3–1	Edmonton Oilers (1976–77)	21–27–4
53	L	February 13, 1977	2–5	@ Edmonton Oilers (1976–77)	21–28–4
54	T	February 15, 1977	2–2	@ Winnipeg Jets (1976–77)	21–28–5
55	L	February 16, 1977	3–7	Cincinnati Stingers (1976–77)	21–29–5
56	W	February 18, 1977	5–3	Cincinnati Stingers (1976–77)	22–29–5
57	L	February 20, 1977	0–5	New England Whalers (1976–77)	22–30–5
58	W	February 23, 1977	3–2	Houston Aeros (1976–77)	23–30–5
59	L	February 25, 1977	2–3	New England Whalers (1976–77)	23–31–5
60	W	February 27, 1977	2–1	Indianapolis Racers (1976–77)	24–31–5

March

Game	Result	Date	Score	Opponent	Record
61	W	March 1, 1977	6–1	Winnipeg Jets (1976–77)	25–31–5
62	W	March 3, 1977	4–2	Birmingham Bulls (1976–77)	26–31–5
63	W	March 6, 1977	4–2	San Diego Mariners (1976–77)	27–31–5
64	W	March 9, 1977	4–3	San Diego Mariners (1976–77)	28–31–5
65	L	March 11, 1977	1–4	@ Winnipeg Jets (1976–77)	28–32–5
66	L	March 12, 1977	2–9	@ Cincinnati Stingers (1976–77)	28–33–5
67	L	March 15, 1977	1–3	@ Indianapolis Racers (1976–77)	28–34–5
68	L	March 16, 1977	3–4	@ Cincinnati Stingers (1976–77)	28–35–5
69	L	March 18, 1977	1–3	@ New England Whalers (1976–77)	28–36–5
70	L	March 19, 1977	0–8	@ Quebec Nordiques (1976–77)	28–37–5
71	L	March 20, 1977	0–9	@ New England Whalers (1976–77)	28–38–5
72	L	March 22, 1977	4–7	@ Birmingham Bulls (1976–77)	28–39–5
73	L	March 25, 1977	2–4	@ Houston Aeros (1976–77)	28–40–5
74	L	March 26, 1977	2–4	@ San Diego Mariners (1976–77)	28–41–5
75	W	March 27, 1977	5–4	Phoenix Roadrunners (1976–77)	29–41–5
76	W	March 29, 1977	9–5	Phoenix Roadrunners (1976–77)	30–41–5

April

Game	Result	Date	Score	Opponent	Record
77	W	April 1, 1977	3–1	@ Edmonton Oilers (1976–77)	31–41–5
78	T	April 2, 1977	4–4	Edmonton Oilers (1976–77)	31–41–6
79	L	April 3, 1977	4–6	@ Winnipeg Jets (1976–77)	31–42–6
80	T	April 5, 1977	4–4	Birmingham Bulls (1976–77)	31–42–7
81	L	April 7, 1977	4–6	Winnipeg Jets (1976–77)	31–43–7

Legend: Win (2 points) Loss (0 points) Tie (1 point)

== Player statistics ==
Regular season
Scoring

Player	Pos	GP	G	A	Pts	PIM	+/-	PPG	SHG	GWG
Lynn Powis	C	63	30	30	60	40	4	4	1	0
Warren Miller	RW	80	23	32	55	51	11	2	0	0
Ron Chipperfield	C	81	27	27	54	32	−10	5	0	0
Peter Driscoll	LW	76	23	29	52	120	−8	4	0	0
Danny Lawson	RW	64	24	19	43	26	−13	2	1	0
Chris Evans	D	81	7	27	34	60	12	0	0	0
Dave Kryskow	LW	45	16	17	33	47	−14	3	1	0
Paul Terbenche	D	80	9	24	33	30	−14	0	0	0
Don Tannahill	LW	72	10	22	32	4	−9	0	4	0
Butch Deadmarsh	LW	38	13	17	30	77	−5	3	0	0
George Morrison	LW	63	11	19	30	10	−10	2	0	0
John Miszuk	D	79	2	26	28	57	5	0	0	0
Mike Ford	D	54	5	20	25	14	−8	2	0	0
Dick Sentes	LW	29	10	14	24	8	17	1	0	0
Rich Lemieux	C	33	6	11	17	9	−4	1	0	0
John Arbour	D	37	1	15	16	38	−26	1	0	0
Wayne Connelly	C	25	5	6	11	4	−2	1	0	0
Ron Ward	C	9	5	5	10	0	2	1	0	0
Rick Jodzio	LW	46	4	6	10	61	−13	0	0	0
Veli-Pekka Ketola	C	17	4	6	10	2	−17	1	0	0
Don McLeod	G	67	0	9	9	2	0	0	0	0
Jacques Locas	C	22	3	4	7	2	−5	1	0	0
Joe Micheletti	D	14	3	3	6	10	−5	2	0	0
Paul Hurley	D	34	0	6	6	32	−8	0	0	0
Jim Mayer	RW	21	2	3	5	0	−9	0	0	0
Tom Serviss	C	8	2	1	3	2	−1	0	0	0
Andre Deschamps	LW	9	1	2	3	19	−2	0	0	0
Claude St. Sauveur	C	17	0	3	3	2	−3	0	0	0
Wayne Morrin	D	13	2	0	2	25	−3	0	0	0
George Pesut	D	17	2	0	2	2	−7	2	0	0
Bruce Greig	LW	7	1	1	2	10	−1	0	0	0
Jim Boyd	C	13	0	2	2	6	−7	0	0	0
Steve Hull	RW	2	0	2	2	0	1	0	0	0
Brian Walsh	C	5	0	2	2	12	−3	0	0	0
Danny Gruen	LW	1	1	0	1	0	2	0	0	0
Bernie Lukowich	RW	6	0	1	1	0	2	0	0	0
Ken Baird	D	7	0	0	0	2	−2	0	0	0
Gary Bromley	G	28	0	0	0	2	0	0	0	0
Larry Israelson	LW	2	0	0	0	0	−2	0	0	0
Ric Jordan	D	5	0	0	0	4	−9	0	0	0
Doug Lindskog	LW	2	0	0	0	2	−1	0	0	0

Goaltending

Player	MIN	GP	W	L	T	GA	GAA	SO
Don McLeod	3701	67	25	34	5	210	3.40	3
Gary Bromley	1237	28	6	9	2	79	3.83	0
Team:	4938	81	31	43	7	289	3.51	3

Note: Pos = Position; GP = Games played; G = Goals; A = Assists; Pts = Points; +/- = plus/minus; PIM = Penalty minutes; PPG = Power-play goals; SHG = Short-handed goals; GWG = Game-winning goals
MIN = Minutes played; W = Wins; L = Losses; T = Ties; GA = Goals-against; GAA = Goals-against average; SO = Shutouts;

== Draft picks ==
Calgary's draft picks at the 1976 WHA Amateur Draft.

Round	#	Player	Nationality	College/Junior/Club team (League)
2	18	David Shand (D)	Canada	Peterborough Petes (OHA)
4	43	Alain Belanger (RW)	Canada	Sherbrooke Castors (QMJHL)
5	55	Bruce Baker (RW)	Canada	Ottawa 67's (OHA)
6	67	Lorry Gloeckner (D)	Canada	Victoria Cougars (WCHL)
7	79	Phil Verchota (F)	United States	University of Minnesota (WCHA)
8	91	Don Jackson (D)	United States	University of Notre Dame (WCHA)
9	102	Rob Palmer (D)	Canada	University of Michigan (WCHA)
10	113	Cal Sandbeck (D)	United States	University of Denver (WCHA)

== See also ==
- 1976–77 WHA season
