= Hebenton =

Hebenton is a surname. Notable people with the surname include:

- Andy Hebenton (1929–2019), Canadian ice hockey player
- Clay Hebenton (born 1953), Canadian ice hockey player
