= Kevin Bieksa =

Canadian ice hockey player (born 1981)

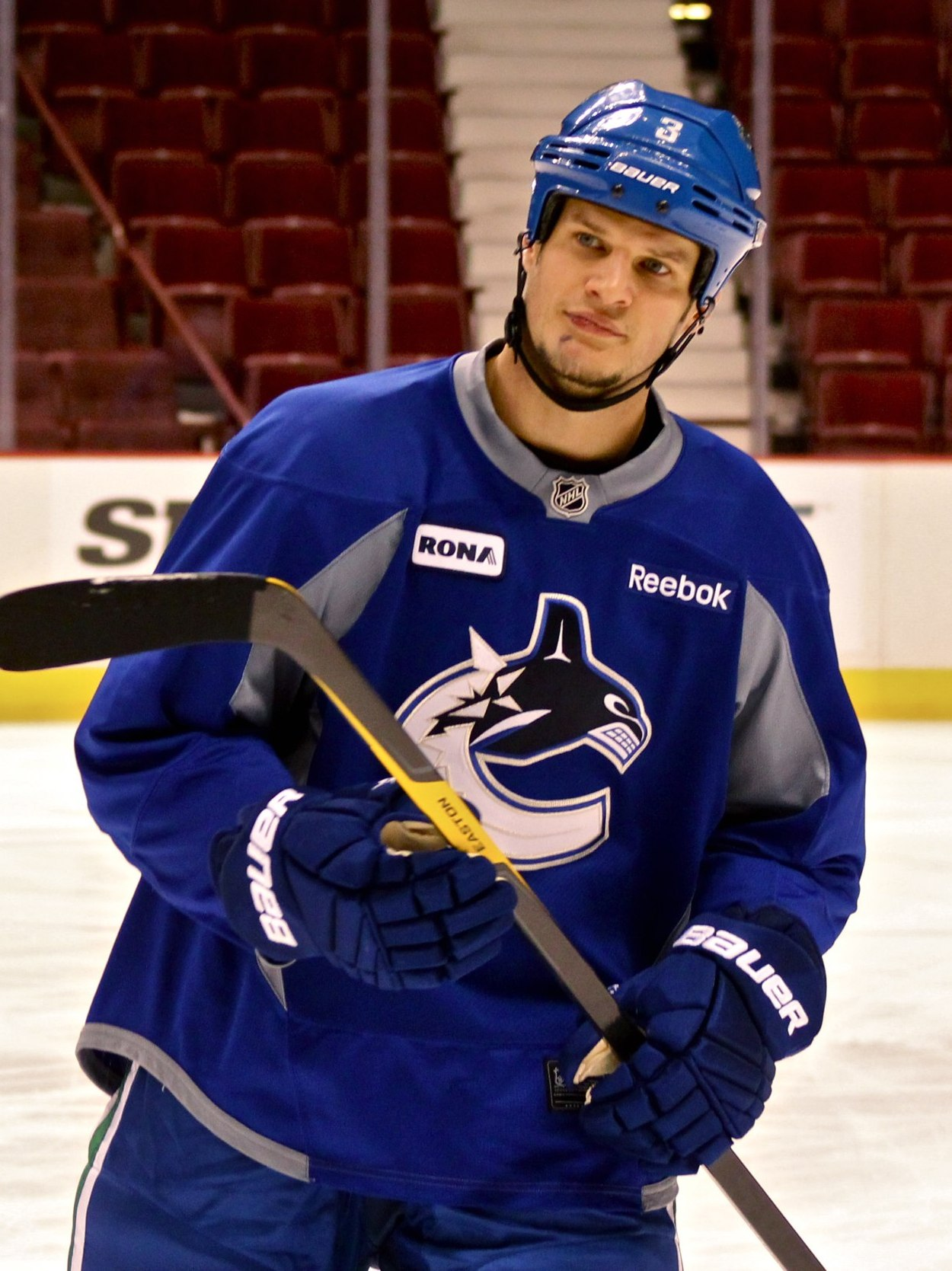
- Bieksa with the Vancouver Canucks in March 2012
- Born: June 16, 1981 (age 45) Grimsby, Ontario, Canada
- Height: 6 ft 1 in (185 cm)
- Weight: 197 lb (89 kg; 14 st 1 lb)
- Position: Defence
- Shot: Right
- Played for: Vancouver Canucks; Anaheim Ducks
- National team: Canada
- NHL draft: 151st overall, 2001; Vancouver Canucks
- Playing career: 2004–2018

Kevin Francesco Bieksa (born June 16, 1981) is a Canadian former professional ice hockey player and television personality who co-hosts Hockey Night in Canada.

As a defenceman, Bieksa started and played most of his career with the Vancouver Canucks and later played for the Anaheim Ducks. After a three-year career in the Ontario Junior Hockey League (OJHL) with the Burlington Cougars, Bieksa was awarded a scholarship to Bowling Green State University. He was a one-time All-CCHA honourable mention during his four-year tenure with the Falcons of the Central Collegiate Hockey Association (CCHA). He graduated from the university with a bachelor's degree (B.A.) in finance, and was a two-time CCHA All-Academic honourable mention in 2003 and 2004. Selected 151st overall by the Canucks in the 2001 NHL entry draft, he joined their minor league affiliate, the Manitoba Moose of the American Hockey League (AHL), upon graduating. He earned AHL All-Rookie Team honours in his first and only full season with the Moose, before joining the Canucks as a regular member in 2005–06.

Bieksa represented his country in the 2014 World Championship. He was selected as team captain and named one of three top players for Canada in the tournament. Bieksa represented Canada for the second time in his career at the 2018 Spengler Cup.

== Playing career ==
=== Minor hockey ===
Bieksa grew up in Grimsby playing minor hockey for the local Jr. Peach Kings program of the OMHA's Niagara District BB-E league before graduating to the Stoney Creek Warriors of the OMHA South Central AAA League. He played part of the 1997–98 season with the Stoney Creek Warriors of the OHA Golden Horseshoe Jr.B and the Jr.A Burlington Cougars before being drafted by Don Cherry and the Mississauga IceDogs in the 17th round of the 1998 Ontario Hockey League draft. Bieksa made the Ice Dogs out of camp but decided to pursue an NCAA scholarship.

=== Junior and university ===
Bieksa began a three-year Junior A career with the Burlington Cougars of the Ontario Junior Hockey League (OJHL) in 1997–98. He recorded 37 points over 48 games in his second season with the Cougars and 33 points in his third. Bieksa was drafted into the major junior Ontario Hockey League (OHL) by the Mississauga IceDogs, but opted to play college hockey in the NCAA instead.

In 2000–01, Bieksa joined the Bowling Green Falcons of the Central Collegiate Hockey Association (CCHA). After a 13-point regular season in 35 games as a freshman, he helped the Falcons become the lowest-seeded team in League history (ninth) to advance to the CCHA semifinals. He scored his team's lone goal in a 2–1 defeat to Michigan State University before the Falcons were eliminated.

In the 2001 off-season, Bieksa was drafted by the Vancouver Canucks with the 151st pick in the 2001 NHL entry draft. He returned to Bowling Green to complete his four-year college career after being drafted, recording 15 points in 2001–02. Bieksa was named an alternate captain prior to his third season and subsequently improved to a college career-high eight goals and 25 points in 2002–03. Bieksa was chosen by Falcons fans as the recipient of the W. G. Grinder's Grinder Award and was a co-recipient of the team's Jim Ruehl Award as the best defensive player with Jordan Sigalet. He was also given his first of two consecutive honourable mentions as a CCHA All-Academic.

Playing in his fourth and final college season in 2003–04, he scored seven goals and 22 points in 38 games, while leading his team in shots on goal. He earned an honourable mention to the All-CCHA Team and received the Falcons' Howard Brown Award as the coaches' selection for best player.

=== Manitoba Moose ===
Following his college career, Bieksa signed an amateur tryout contract with the Manitoba Moose, the Canucks' American Hockey League (AHL) affiliate, on March 24, 2004. During his tryout, he was involved in an off-ice incident with teammate Fedor Fedorov. According to then-Canucks general manager Brian Burke, several Moose players had gone out together when Bieksa accidentally spilled Fedorov's beer. Bieksa apologized and offered to buy him another beer, but Fedorov challenged him to a fight outside of the establishment which Bieksa won with one punch. When he heard about the incident, Burke said, he wanted to sign Bieksa the next day.

Bieksa went on to appear in four games with the Moose to close out the 2003–04 season, notching two assists. He remained with the Moose in 2004–05 and scored his first professional goal on the powerplay in a 3–2 shootout victory against the Cleveland Barons on November 11, 2004. Bieksa finished his first full professional season with 12 goals and 39 points in 80 games. He was chosen as the AHL Rookie of the Month for March after recording two goals, 11 points and a +11 rating in 13 games and was named to the AHL All-Rookie Team after his first full professional season. His 39 points broke Kirill Koltsov's team mark of 32 for points by a defenceman, set the previous season. Canucks assistant general manager Steve Tambellini lauded Bieksa for his quick adjustment and development from college hockey to the AHL.

During the campaign, he was given the nickname "Juice" by Moose goaltender Alex Auld, a moniker that continued into his NHL career with the Canucks. Bieksa described the origin of the nickname as a "funny story that's been escalated to the point where it's bigger than it should be" and was based around him "drinking juice."

Bieksa entered the Canucks' 2005–06 training camp as a projected competitor to be the team's sixth defenceman. However, three days into prospects camp, he suffered a high ankle sprain after colliding into the boards with another defenceman. He was reassigned to the Moose on October 3, 2005, and missed the first month and a half of the 2005–06 season. While sidelined, Bieksa was named an alternate captain to Mike Keane by Moose head coach Alain Vigneault on October 29. He made his return to the line-up on November 11 against the Rochester Americans. In his second game back, he notched two goals and an assist on November 15 against the Grand Rapids Griffins in a 6–5 shootout loss.

=== Professional (2005–2018) ===
==== Vancouver Canucks (2005–2015) ====
With 16 points through 20 games with the Moose, Bieksa was called up by the Canucks and played his first NHL game on December 19, 2005, against the Los Angeles Kings. He was called for a roughing penalty ten seconds into his first shift and played 10 minutes and 45 seconds total in a 4–3 shootout loss to the Kings. The following month, he notched his first NHL point, an assist to Markus Näslund, in a 3–2 win against the Chicago Blackhawks on January 5, 2006. He remained with the Canucks until near the end of the season, as he was reassigned to the Moose on April 8 to make room for the return of Ed Jovanovski from injury. Bieksa finished the season with six assists in 39 games for the Canucks, averaging 16 minutes of ice-time per game.

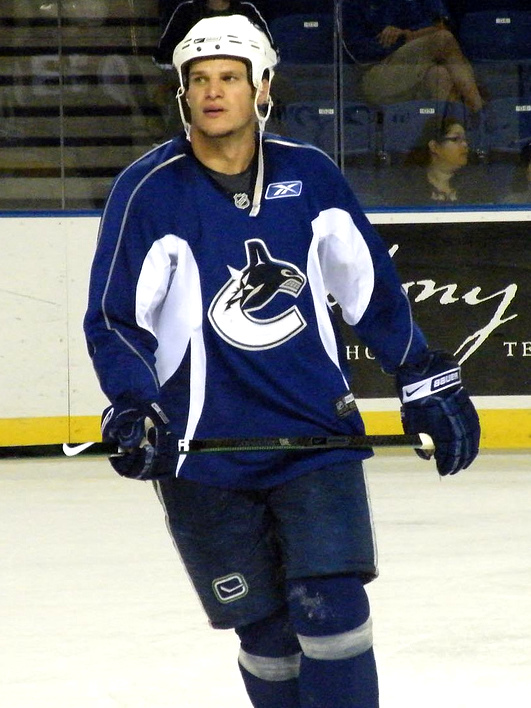
Bieksa skates at a Canucks practice in April 2009

On August 17, 2006, he was re-signed by the Canucks to a two-year, one-way, $1.05 million contract. Early in the 2006–07 season, he scored his first NHL goal on October 13, against Vesa Toskala in a loss to the San Jose Sharks. Bieksa rapidly developed into one of the Canucks' top blueliners and finished the season leading all team defencemen with 30 assists, 42 points and 134 penalty minutes, while also tallying a career-high 12 goals. Paired with stay-at-home defenceman Willie Mitchell, he was also regularly given a shutdown role against opposing teams' top forwards. At the end of his first full NHL season, he was awarded the Canucks' Babe Pratt Trophy as best defenceman and Fred J. Hume Award as the unsung hero. In Bieksa's first NHL playoff game he had just over 55 mins of ice time in a quadruple Overtime victory against the Dallas Stars. Later in the series Bieksa suffered three stomach oblique muscle tears in Game 6 sidelining him for five games, before the Canucks were eliminated by the eventual Stanley Cup champion, the Anaheim Ducks, in the second round in five games.

The Canucks acknowledged Bieksa's break-out sophomore season by re-signing him to a three-year, $11.25 million contract extension, on July 9, 2007. The first year of the deal, in 2008–09, saw Bieksa make $4.25 million, while the remaining two years were set at $3.5 million. He had one more season left on his original contract at $550,000.

A relative unknown in his first couple of seasons in the NHL, his last name, which is pronounced phonetically (Bee-ek-sa), was frequently mispronounced by sports newscasters and hockey broadcasters such as Bob Cole and Harry Neale of Hockey Night in Canada. It has even been misspelled on scoreboards.

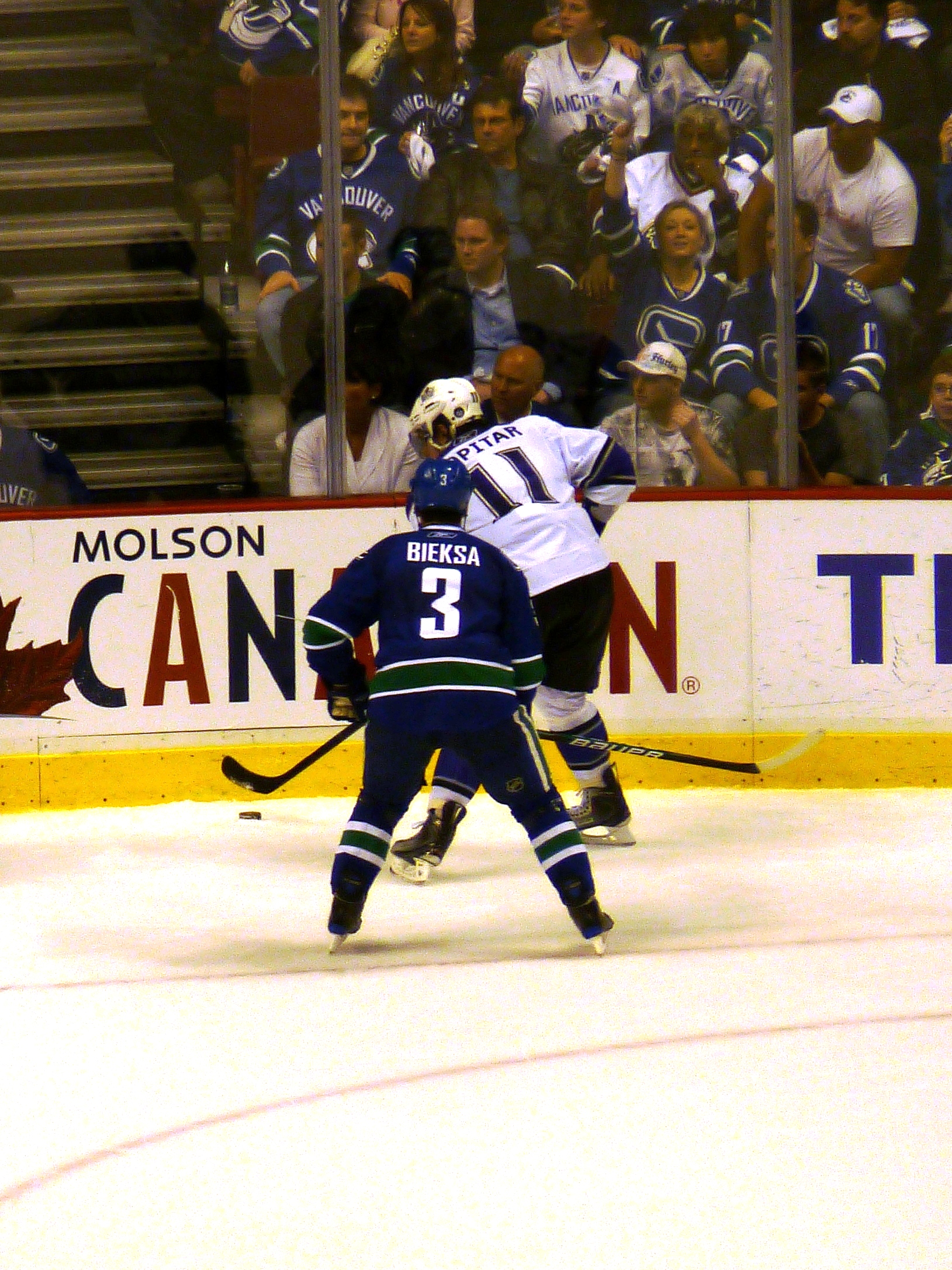
Bieksa defending against Anže Kopitar in April 2010

A month into the 2007–08 season, Bieksa suffered a severe calf laceration in a game against the Nashville Predators on November 1, 2007. After battling with forward Vernon Fiddler against the boards, Fiddler's skate slashed Bieksa across the back of his right calf. Bieksa was helped to the bench, leaving a trail of blood behind him on the ice. He ended up missing 47 games. Before returning to the line-up, he was assigned to the Moose for a one-game conditioning stint. Bieksa managed 12 points in 34 games.

He continued rehabilitating his calf in the 2008 off-season, after the Canucks failed to qualify for the 2008 playoffs, admitting that his leg had not fully recovered upon his early return. However, injury troubles continued early in 2008–09. On November 4, 2008, he was re-injured after blocking a puck off his skate against the Nashville Predators. Bieksa played through the injury for several games before learning that he had suffered a bone fracture in his left foot. He returned to the line-up after missing seven games. Despite missing ten games in total, Bieksa established an impressive career-high 32 assists along with 11 goals for 43 points, first among team defencemen.

Without a no-trade clause in his contract with the Canucks and seen as an emerging offensive defencemen throughout the NHL, Bieksa was routinely the subject of trade rumours. In the 2009 off-season, one such trade rumour was central in a feud between general managers Mike Gillis of Vancouver and Brian Burke of the Toronto Maple Leafs. On a Leafs TV documentary on the 2009 NHL entry draft that aired in September 2009, a segment involves Burke speculating that the Canucks had offered Bieksa to the Tampa Bay Lightning in a package that included forward Alexandre Burrows and a first-round draft-choice in exchange for Tampa Bay's second-overall selection. The documentary was immediately pulled from airing again and the Maple Leafs received a warning from the League. Bieksa suffered the second serious cut to his leg in three seasons in 2009–10. During a game against the Phoenix Coyotes on December 29, 2009, he bodychecked opposing forward Petr Průcha, whose skate cut into his left leg, above the ankle. It was revealed six days later that Bieksa sustained severed tendons in his ankle. He was sidelined for three-and-a-half months, missing 27 games. The injury marked the second time in three years that he missed significant time due to a lower-body skate cut. As a result, he was limited to 55 games, notching three goals and 19 assists for 22 points. In the last game of the regular season on April 10, 2010, he scored his first two-goal game in the NHL in a 7–3 win against the Calgary Flames. Playing the sixth-seeded Los Angeles Kings in the opening round of the 2010 playoffs, Bieksa scored his first career playoff goal in the series' sixth and deciding game. His goal against Kings goaltender Jonathan Quick tied the score at 2–2 in the third period, en route to a 4–2 Canucks win. The Canucks were then eliminated by the Chicago Blackhawks the following round in six games for the second consecutive year. Bieksa finished the playoffs with three goals and eight points in all 12 games to lead team defencemen in scoring.

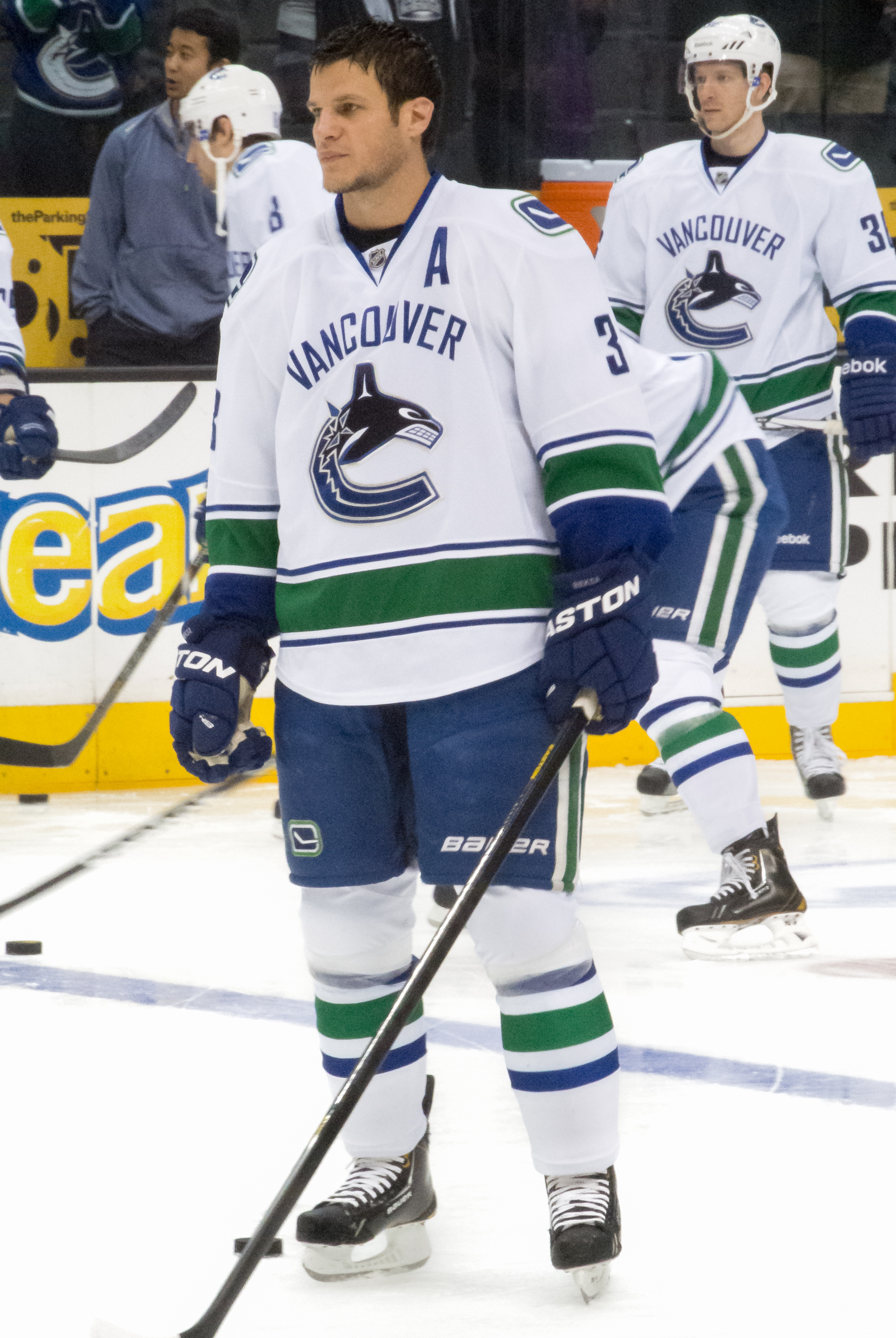
Bieksa warming up prior to a game in January 2013

Following the defensive acquisitions of Keith Ballard and Dan Hamhuis in free agency in the 2010 off-season, Bieksa was once again involved in trade rumours. Despite being several million dollars over the salary cap, general manager Mike Gillis asserted after signing Hamhuis that the Canucks were "keeping Bieksa." During the 2010–11 season, Bieksa's offensive production decreased, but he was lauded by the media and head coach Alain Vigneault for improving his defensive game. He had been criticized at times in the past for making risk/reward plays that resulted in scoring chances for the opposing team, but his play improved to become more responsible in the defensive zone. On February 15, 2011, he suffered a 2nd fractured bone in his foot. Playing in a game against the Minnesota Wild, Bieksa sustained the injury while blocking a shot. While he finished the game and initial x-rays came back negative, a subsequent CT-scan revealed the fracture. He became the sixth Canucks defenceman injured at the time. After missing 15 games, he returned to the line-up on March 23, in a Canucks 2–1 win over the Detroit Red Wings. Playing on a shutdown defensive pairing with Dan Hamhuis, his season-ending +32 plus-minus established a personal best and ranked second in the NHL, one point behind Boston Bruins defenceman and captain Zdeno Chára. Complementing his strong defensive play, he recorded six goals and 16 assists for 22 points in 66 games. With the Canucks winning the Presidents' Trophy for the first time in franchise history, the team entered the 2011 playoffs as the first seed in the West. On April 19, during game four in the first round of the playoffs against the eighth-seeded and defending Stanley Cup champions, the Chicago Blackhawks, in which the Canucks lost 7–2, Bieksa drew controversy after picking a fight with Blackhawks' forward Viktor Stålberg out of frustration after a trio of hits Stålberg laid on Bieksa himself along with teammates Maxim Lapierre and Keith Ballard, respectively. Bieksa did not receive an instigator penalty despite being the instigator of the altercation and Stålberg's face getting bloodied. Had he received one, it would've been a one game suspension since the instigation of the fight happened with less than five minutes in the game. Despite this, Bieksa did not receive a suspension by the NHL. After game four ended, Bieksa told reporters that the motivation behind him and the Canucks was to finish the game hard and finish it physical" and stated "That's been our game plan all along, so that's what we did." After eventually helping Vancouver advance past the defending Stanley Cup champion Chicago Blackhawks in seven games along with the Nashville Predators six games in the first two rounds to advance to the Conference Finals for the first time since 1994. On May 18, in game two of the series against the San Jose Sharks, Bieksa recorded his first career Gordie Howe hat-trick as he recorded a goal on Sharks goaltender Antti Niemi, an assist on a goal by Chris Higgins and got into a fight with Sharks forward Patrick Marleau as the Canucks bombarded the Sharks in game two with a 7–3 win to take a 2–0 lead in the series. The Canucks would eventually go on to win the series in five games against the second-seeded Sharks to earn a spot on the Stanley Cup Final for the first time since 1994. Bieksa ended the series with five points (four goals and an assist) recorded in all five games in the series including the series-clinching goal in double-overtime in game 5 to send the Canucks to the Stanley Cup Final for the first time since 1994. The goal came after fellow Canucks defenceman Alexander Edler's dump-in had bounced off a stanchion along the boards. With Sharks goaltender Antti Niemi unaware of the puck's location until after the puck found its way into the net, Bieksa took a slapshot from the blueline to win the game. Facing the Boston Bruins in the Finals, the Canucks were defeated in seven games. Bieksa finished the playoffs with 10 points (five goals and assists) in all 25 games played. His five goals led all playoff defencemen, while his average ice time of 25 minutes and 40 seconds per game was first among Canucks players. It was revealed after the Canucks' elimination that several players had been playing with injuries, including Bieksa, who had suffered a bruised medial collateral ligament, which he initially suffered in game two of the Finals from a slash from Bruins' forward Rich Peverley that went uncalled.

Having played the final year of his existing contract, Bieksa addressed his pending unrestricted free agency by telling the media he was ready to re-sign for less than market value in order to remain with the Canucks. Shortly thereafter, on June 27, 2011, Bieksa signed a five-year, $23 million contract extension. The deal came with a no-trade clause and was reported to be front-loaded, with Bieksa making $7 million in his first year, followed by $4.5 million, $5 million, $4 million and $2.5 million annual salaries. The deal kept the popular defenceman amongst the core for another chance at winning a Stanley Cup. Bieksa played 78 games in the 2011–12 season with eight goals and 36 assists for 44 points to help the Canucks win the Presidents' Trophy for the second consecutive season, but the Canucks were upset in the first round of the 2012 playoffs by the eighth-seeded and eventual Stanley Cup champions, the Los Angeles Kings.

On December 22, 2013, Bieksa played his 500th NHL game in a 2–1 win over the Winnipeg Jets. Bieksa ended the 2013–14 season playing in 76 games with four goals and 20 assists for 24 points recorded although the Canucks missed the 2014 playoffs, marking for the first time since 2008 where Bieksa and the team missed the playoffs.

On January 20, 2015, Bieksa suffered a broken hand in a 4–1 loss to the Tampa Bay Lightning after getting struck by a puck from a slapshot by Lightning' defenceman Victor Hedman. He underwent successful hand surgery on February 6 to repair the injury resulting in him missing the next 22 games. Bieksa eventually ended the 2014–15 season with four goals and 10 assists for 14 points in 60 games as the Canucks returned to the playoffs after missing by eight points the year prior. Bieksa played all six games recording an assist in the 2015 playoffs as the Canucks were defeated in six games in the first round by the Calgary Flames.

==== Anaheim Ducks (2015–2018) ====
On June 30, 2015, the Vancouver Canucks traded Bieksa to the Anaheim Ducks in exchange for a second-round pick in the 2016 NHL entry draft reuniting him with Ryan Kesler, who had been traded to the Ducks by the Canucks the previous off-season. Two days later, Bieksa signed a two-year, $8,000,000 contract extension that ran through the 2017–18 season. The deal included a full no-movement clause. Adjusting to a new team for the first time in his career, Bieksa recorded 15 points (four goals, 11 assists) in 71 games during the 2015–16 season. Bieksa would also play in all six playoff games where he recorded just one assist as the Ducks were defeated in the first round of the 2016 playoffs by the Nashville Predators in seven games.

In the 2016–17 season, his second season with the Ducks, Bieksa continued to help develop and mentor the young defence core. He finished the season with three goals and 11 assists for 14 points in 81 games played. Upon arriving into the 2017 playoffs, the Ducks swept the Calgary Flames in the first round. Bieksa finished the series with four assists in four games. Following a tear to his medial collateral ligament (MCL) in the first game of the second round against the Edmonton Oilers, he missed the rest of the series (where the Ducks defeated the Oilers in seven games) but returned in the conference finals against the Nashville Predators who defeated the Ducks in six games.

During the 2017–18 season, Bieksa was held without a goal for the first time since his rookie season, the 2005–06 season. Despite being goalless, he recorded eight assists for eight points in 59 games played. He also played one game in the Ducks first round sweep against the San Jose Sharks in the 2018 playoffs and was held pointless.

=== Retirement ===
On October 13, 2022, the Canucks announced that Bieksa would sign a one-day contract with the team and retire on November 3 when the Canucks played against the Ducks.

== Playing style ==
Bieksa was known as a two-way defenceman with the Canucks. With the Canucks, he was paired with Willie Mitchell from 2006–07 and 2009–10 and Dan Hamhuis from 2010–11 to 2014–15, respectively. Regularly jumping into the rush, he led the Canucks' defencemen in scoring in 2006–07 and 2008–09. His play was aggressive and physical. He earned a reputation as a fighter early in his career in the AHL. Though he was a very strong two-way defender first and foremost, Bieksa was also known as a very rugged defender who would drop his gloves at pretty much any time. He became known around the league for performing a variation of a one punch knockout style superman punch on skates, which he executed successfully a few times during his NHL career. At one point he was listed online as an undefeated fighter with well over 30 NHL fights as reported by Scott Oake of Hockey Night in Canada.

He was praised throughout his career for his leadership qualities by coaches, NHL executives and by his close teammates including the Sedin twins. Henrik at the Sedin's retirement ceremony in Vancouver in February 2020 called Bieksa a "Great leader, a great teammate".

Bieksa along with Canucks teammates Ryan Kesler, Alexandre Burrows and Maxim Lapierre were known as four of the most fierce competitors of their time in the NHL as all four players were driving forces behind the Canucks' 2011 Stanley Cup Final run and in their two back-to-back Presidents' Trophy-winning seasons in 2010–11 and 2011–12, respectively. During these times, they were commonly known to be among the league's most frustrating players to play against.

== Post-playing career ==
In 2019, Bieksa and Dean Caban co-founded West Coast Academy, an ice hockey academy in Southern California.

In 2020, he joined the Hockey Night in Canada team as a regular member of the analysis panel. He was a Canadian Screen Award nominee for Best Sports Analyst in 2021 and 2022, before winning in 2024 at the 12th Canadian Screen Awards.

From 2019 to 2021 he served as assistant coach for the Anaheim Jr. Ducks. From the 2021–22 season he served as assistant coach for the Fairmont Preparatory Academy Huskies.

Bieksa also joined KO Sports, a boutique ice hockey agency, as elite defence mentorship. He was joined by former teammate Ryan Kesler who joined as elite forward mentorship.

== Personal life ==
Bieksa was born in Grimsby, Ontario, on June 16, 1981, to Al Bieksa and Angela Lombardo. He has two brothers, Marty and Bryan, and two stepsisters, Terri Lynn and Jennifer. His father works in the Ontario Federation of Labour and coached his three sons during minor hockey. Bieksa began playing minor hockey in Grimsby before joining AAA teams in Stoney Creek, Ontario. After attending Blessed Trinity Secondary School in his hometown, he graduated from Bowling Green State University in 2004 with a bachelor's degree in finance and a 3.42 grade point average (GPA).

During Bieksa's tenure with both the Manitoba Moose and Vancouver Canucks, he became close friends with teammate Rick Rypien who suffered from years of clinical depression. Bieksa was the first Canucks teammate that Rypien confided in regarding his mental health. When Rypien took his first personal leave of absence from the Canucks in the 2008–09 season, Bieksa and Manitoba Moose general manager Craig Heisinger drove through a snowstorm to reach Rypien's family home in Alberta. Bieksa and his wife opened up their Vancouver condominium to Rypien in helping Rypien's return to the Canucks. Following Rypien's suicide in August 2011, Bieksa was involved in many of the ceremonies and helped create Hockey Talks to honour Rypien's legacy. Bieksa was a pallbearer at Rypien's funeral in Alberta and he later presented Rypien's family with one of the forward's game-worn Canucks jerseys during the team's pre-game ceremony in Rypien's honour in October 2011.

Bieksa and his wife, Katie, have two children, a son and daughter. The family resides in Newport Beach, California. Katie published a book in July 2017 titled Newport Jane, which is a semi-autobiographical story of a woman adjusting to a new life in California, that was inspired by Bieksa's trade from Vancouver to Anaheim in June 2015.

== Career statistics ==
=== Regular season and playoffs ===
			Regular season					Playoffs
Season	Team	League	GP	G	A	Pts	PIM	GP	G	A	Pts	PIM
1997–98	Burlington Cougars	OPJHL	27	0	3	3	10	—	—	—	—	—
1998–99	Burlington Cougars	OPJHL	48	8	29	37	83	—	—	—	—	—
1999–00	Burlington Cougars	OPJHL	49	6	27	33	139	—	—	—	—	—
2000–01	Bowling Green State University	CCHA	35	4	9	13	90	—	—	—	—	—
2001–02	Bowling Green State University	CCHA	40	5	10	15	68	—	—	—	—	—
2002–03	Bowling Green State University	CCHA	34	8	17	25	92	—	—	—	—	—
2003–04	Bowling Green State University	CCHA	38	7	15	22	66	—	—	—	—	—
2003–04	Manitoba Moose	AHL	4	0	2	2	2	—	—	—	—	—
2004–05	Manitoba Moose	AHL	80	12	27	39	192	14	1	1	2	35
2005–06	Manitoba Moose	AHL	23	3	17	20	71	13	0	10	10	38
2005–06	Vancouver Canucks	NHL	39	0	6	6	77	—	—	—	—	—
2006–07	Vancouver Canucks	NHL	81	12	30	42	134	9	0	0	0	20
2007–08	Manitoba Moose	AHL	1	0	1	1	2	—	—	—	—	—
2007–08	Vancouver Canucks	NHL	34	2	10	12	90	—	—	—	—	—
2008–09	Vancouver Canucks	NHL	72	11	32	43	97	10	0	5	5	14
2009–10	Vancouver Canucks	NHL	55	3	19	22	85	12	3	5	8	14
2010–11	Vancouver Canucks	NHL	66	6	16	22	73	25	5	5	10	51
2011–12	Vancouver Canucks	NHL	78	8	36	44	94	5	1	0	1	6
2012–13	Vancouver Canucks	NHL	36	6	6	12	48	4	1	0	1	8
2013–14	Vancouver Canucks	NHL	76	4	20	24	104	—	—	—	—	—
2014–15	Vancouver Canucks	NHL	60	4	10	14	77	6	0	0	0	9
2015–16	Anaheim Ducks	NHL	71	4	11	15	99	6	0	1	1	2
2016–17	Anaheim Ducks	NHL	81	3	11	14	63	8	0	4	4	23
2017–18	Anaheim Ducks	NHL	59	0	8	8	83	1	0	0	0	0
NHL totals			808	63	215	278	1124	86	10	20	30	147

=== International ===
Year	Team	Event	Result	GP	G	A	Pts	PIM
2014	Canada	WC	5th	8	2	2	4	4
Senior totals				8	2	2	4	4

== Awards and honours ==
=== Bowling Green Falcons team awards ===
Award	Year(s)
W. G. Grinder's Grinder Award	2003
Jim Ruehl Award (co-recipient with Jordan Sigalet)	2003
Howard Brown Award	2004

=== AHL ===
Award	Year(s)
AHL All-Rookie Team	2005

=== Vancouver Canucks team awards ===
Award	Year(s)
Babe Pratt Trophy	2007
Fred J. Hume Award	2007

=== Canadian Screen Awards ===
Award	Year	Category	Work	Result	Ref(s)
Canadian Screen Awards	2021	Best Sports Analyst	Hockey Night in Canada	Nominated	
Canadian Screen Awards	2022	Best Sports Analyst	Hockey Night in Canada	Nominated	
Canadian Screen Awards	2024	Best Sports Analyst	Hockey Night in Canada	Won	
Canadian Screen Awards	2025	Best Sports Analyst	Hockey Night in Canada	Won	
Canadian Screen Awards	2026	Best Sports Analyst	Hockey Night in Canada	Won	

== Records ==
- Manitoba Moose franchise record; most points by a rookie defenceman – 39 in 2004–05 (surpassed Kirill Koltsov, 32 in 2003–04)
