= Murray Kuntz =

Canadian ice hockey player

- Born: December 19, 1945 (age 79); Ottawa, Ontario, Canada
- Height: 5 ft 10 in (178 cm)
- Weight: 178 lb (81 kg; 12 st 10 lb)
- Position: Right wing
- Shot: Left
- Played for: St. Louis Blues
- Playing career: 1966–1977

Murray Robert Kuntz (born December 19, 1945) is a Canadian former professional ice hockey right winger. He played seven games in the National Hockey League with the St. Louis Blues in the 1974–75 season. The rest of his career, which lasted from 1966 to 1977, was spent in the minor leagues. He was born in Ottawa, Ontario. He is the son of former NHL player Alan Kuntz.

== Career statistics ==
=== Regular season and playoffs ===
			Regular season					Playoffs
Season	Team	League	GP	G	A	Pts	PIM	GP	G	A	Pts	PIM
1964–65	Brockville Braves	CJHL	—	—	—	—	—	—	—	—	—	—
1965–66	Ottawa Junior Montagnards	Midg	—	—	—	—	—	—	—	—	—	—
1966–67	Toledo Blades	IHL	10	5	4	9	4	—	—	—	—	—
1966–67	New Haven Blades	EHL	36	13	10	23	11	—	—	—	—	—
1967–68	New Haven Blades	EHL	72	40	60	100	34	10	5	5	10	7
1968–69	New Haven Blades	EHL	25	28	31	59	25	10	4	6	10	2
1969–70	New Haven Blades	EHL	74	51	47	98	68	11	1	5	6	2
1970–71	Salt Lake Golden Eagles	WHL	68	18	22	40	14	—	—	—	—	—
1971–72	Cincinnati Swords	AHL	45	4	9	13	20	—	—	—	—	—
1972–73	Cincinnati Swords	AHL	63	35	30	65	10	13	4	4	8	6
1973–74	Rochester Americans	AHL	73	51	31	82	33	6	0	3	3	2
1974–75	St. Louis Blues	NHL	7	1	2	3	0	—	—	—	—	—
1974–75	Denver Spurs	CHL	26	11	16	27	10	—	—	—	—	—
1974–75	Syracuse Eagles	AHL	33	14	16	30	38	1	1	0	1	0
1975–76	Springfield Indians	AHL	39	17	12	29	10	—	—	—	—	—
1975–76	Baltimore Clippers	AHL	39	11	6	17	2	—	—	—	—	—
1976–77	Maine Nordiques	NAHL	46	19	17	36	8	11	2	5	7	2
1976–77	Beauce Jaros	NAHL	23	9	17	26	14	—	—	—	—	—
AHL totals			292	132	104	236	113	20	5	7	12	8
EHL totals			207	132	148	280	138	31	10	16	26	11
NHL totals			7	1	2	3	0	—	—	—	—	—

Preceded by Yvon Lambert	American Hockey League leading goal scorer 1973–74	Succeeded by Doug Gibson, Barry Merrell, Peter Sullivan, and Jerry Holland (tie)
