= John Hughes (ice hockey, born 1954) =

Canadian ice hockey player (1954–2020)

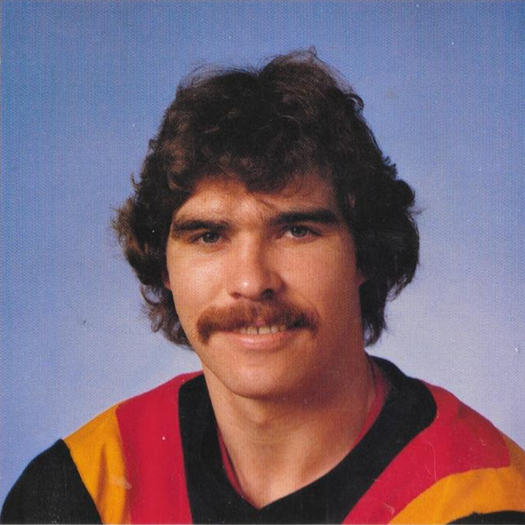
- Born: March 18, 1954 Charlottetown, PE, Canada
- Died: April 8, 2020 (aged 66) Charlottetown, PE, Canada
- Height: 5 ft 11 in (180 cm)
- Weight: 200 lb (91 kg; 14 st 4 lb)
- Position: Defence
- Shot: Left
- Played for: Phoenix Roadrunners; Cincinnati Stingers; Houston Aeros; Edmonton Oilers; Indianapolis Racers; Vancouver Canucks; New York Rangers
- NHL draft: 41st overall, 1974; Vancouver Canucks
- WHA draft: 9th overall, 1974; Houston Aeros
- Playing career: 1974–1982

John Spencer Hughes (March 18, 1954 – April 8, 2020) was a Canadian professional ice hockey player.

== Career ==
The bulk of his professional career was spent in the World Hockey Association (WHA), where he played from 1974 until 1979 for the Phoenix Roadrunners, Cincinnati Stingers, Houston Aeros, Indianapolis Racers, and Edmonton Oilers.

When the WHA folded in 1979, Hughes moved to the National Hockey League (NHL), briefly playing for the Vancouver Canucks, the Oilers (who joined the NHL), and New York Rangers. He retired in 1982. Hughes had 18 goals, 130 assists, 148 points, and 778 penalty minutes in 372 regular season games in the WHA and two goals, 14 assists, 16 points, and 211 penalty minutes in 70 regular season games in the NHL.

== Personal life ==
Hughes died on April 8, 2020, in Charlottetown, Prince Edward Island. He had two children, a son Jason and a daughter Jessica.

== Career statistics ==
=== Regular season and playoffs ===
			Regular season					Playoffs
Season	Team	League	GP	G	A	Pts	PIM	GP	G	A	Pts	PIM
1971–72	Toronto Marlboros	OHA	2	0	0	0	0	1	0	0	0	0
1972–73	Toronto Marlboros	OHA	63	13	42	55	195	16	0	7	7	46
1973–74	Toronto Marlboros	OHA	67	6	34	40	189	—	—	—	—	—
1974–75	Phoenix Roadrunners	WHA	72	4	25	29	201	—	—	—	—	—
1975–76	Cincinnati Stingers	WHA	79	3	34	37	204	—	—	—	—	—
1976–77	Cincinnati Stingers	WHA	79	3	27	30	113	4	0	0	0	8
1977–78	Houston Aeros	WHA	79	3	25	28	130	6	1	1	2	6
1978–79	Indianapolis Racers	WHA	22	3	4	7	48	—	—	—	—	—
1978–79	Edmonton Oilers	WHA	41	2	15	17	81	13	1	0	1	35
1979–80	Vancouver Canucks	NHL	52	2	11	13	181	4	0	0	0	10
1980–81	Edmonton Oilers	NHL	18	0	3	3	30	—	—	—	—	—
1980–81	New York Rangers	NHL	—	—	—	—	—	3	0	1	1	6
1980–81	New Haven Nighthawks	AHL	14	3	6	9	50	2	0	0	0	8
1980–81	Wichita Wind	CHL	23	2	4	6	88	—	—	—	—	—
1981–82	Springfield Indians	AHL	76	1	33	34	174	—	—	—	—	—
WHA totals			372	18	130	148	777	23	2	1	3	49
NHL totals			70	2	14	16	211	7	0	1	1	16
