= Duane Bray =

Canadian ice hockey player (born 1954)

- Born: September 24, 1954 (age 71) Flin Flon, Manitoba, Canada
- Height: 6 ft 2 in (188 cm)
- Weight: 195 lb (88 kg; 13 st 13 lb)
- Position: Defence
- Shot: Left
- Played for: Phoenix Roadrunners
- NHL draft: 179th overall, 1974; Minnesota North Stars
- Playing career: 1974–1978

Duane George Bray (born September 24, 1954) is a Canadian former professional ice hockey player who played in the World Hockey Association (WHA). Bray played part of the 1976–77 WHA season with the Phoenix Roadrunners. He was drafted in the eleventh round of the 1974 NHL amateur draft by the Minnesota North Stars. Bray was born in Flin Flon, Manitoba, but grew up in Hamiota, Manitoba.

== Career statistics ==
=== Regular season and playoffs ===
			Regular season					Playoffs
Season	Team	League	GP	G	A	Pts	PIM	GP	G	A	Pts	PIM
1971–72	Flin Flon Bombers	WCHL	63	4	9	13	134	––	––	––	––	––
1972–73	Flin Flon Bombers	WCHL	66	5	11	16	113	––	––	––	––	––
1973–74	Victoria Cougars	WCHL	1	0	0	0	0	––	––	––	––	––
1973–74	Flin Flon Bombers	WCHL	66	1	9	10	162	––	––	––	––	––
1974–75	Des Moines Capitols	IHL	61	0	8	8	127	7	1	0	1	4
1974–75	Tulsa Oilers	CHL	5	0	2	2	11	––	––	––	––	––
1975–76	Tucson Mavericks	CHL	76	0	9	9	200	––	––	––	––	––
1976–77	Oklahoma City Blazers	CHL	31	0	3	3	73	––	––	––	––	––
1976–77	Phoenix Roadrunners	WHA	46	2	6	8	62	––	––	––	––	––
1977–78	Trail Smoke Eaters	WIHL	––	2	12	14	181	––	––	––	––	––
WHA totals			46	2	6	8	62	—	—	—	—	—
