= Rick Rypien =

Canadian ice hockey player (1984–2011)

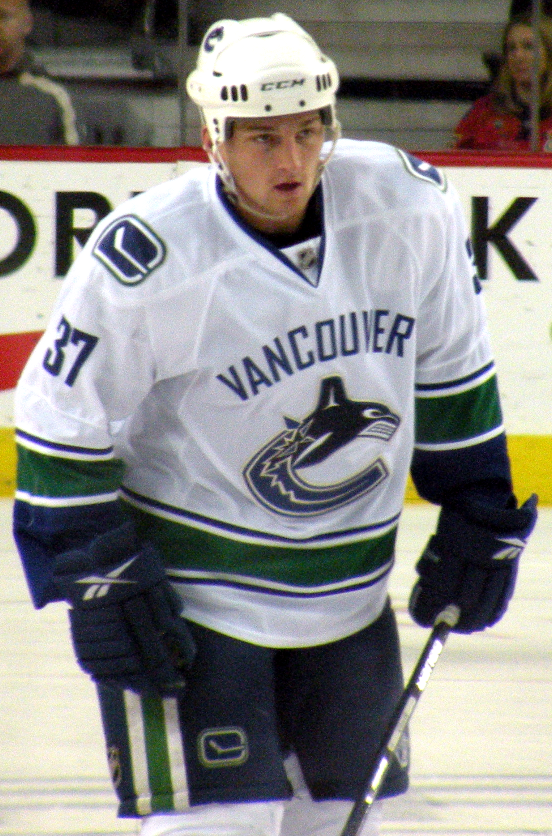
- Rypien with the Vancouver Canucks in October 2009
- Born: May 16, 1984 Blairmore, Alberta, Canada
- Died: August 15, 2011 (aged 27) Crowsnest Pass, Alberta, Canada
- Height: 5 ft 11 in (180 cm)
- Weight: 194 lb (88 kg; 13 st 12 lb)
- Position: Centre
- Shot: Right
- Played for: Vancouver Canucks
- NHL draft: Undrafted
- Playing career: 2005–2011

Richard Joseph Rypien (May 16, 1984 – August 15, 2011) was a Canadian professional ice hockey player who was a forward for parts of six seasons in the National Hockey League (NHL) with the Vancouver Canucks from 2005 to 2011. After a major junior career of four years with the Regina Pats of the Western Hockey League (WHL), he was signed to a professional contract by the minor league Manitoba Moose of the American Hockey League (AHL) in 2005. The following season, he signed with the Canucks. He spent six years with the organization, splitting time between the Canucks and Moose, their AHL affiliate. A fourth-line player in the NHL, he was known for his hitting and fighting abilities, though his size was not typical of an enforcer.

Following the 2010–11 NHL season, Rypien signed with the Winnipeg Jets but died before joining his new team. His death was ruled a suicide and had been preceded by a history of clinical depression, for which he had two personal leaves of absence from the Canucks. In the wake of Rypien's death, the Canucks and the Jets started an initiative to help others with mental illness.

== Early life ==
Rypien was born in Blairmore, Alberta, a community within the municipality of Crowsnest Pass, Alberta, on May 16, 1984. He was raised in nearby Coleman, a community with a population of approximately 1,000. Rypien was the son of Shelley and Wes Rypien, the latter of whom was a Canadian boxing champion. Rypien's older brother, Wes Jr., also played in the WHL and later competed professionally in the ECHL for several seasons. Rypien was also the second cousin of NHL enforcer Shane Churla. Rypien's cousin, Mark Rypien, is a former National Football League (NFL) quarterback who was named the most valuable player of Super Bowl XXVI while his youngest cousin Brett notably played for the Denver Broncos from 2020 to 2022.

Rypien played minor hockey out of the local Crowsnest Pass Minor Hockey Association. At age five or six, he joined his first team, the Pass Rangers from Coleman, coached by his father. Aside from his boxing career, Rypien's father had also played hockey. Rypien followed after his older brother, as well, who had begun hockey before him. Growing up, his favourite players were forwards Wendel Clark and Eric Lindros. During Rypien's second season with the Regina Pats, his girlfriend died in a car accident while en route to watch him play in Calgary.

== Playing career ==
=== Junior career ===
Rypien began his junior career in 2001–02 with the Crowsnest Pass Timberwolves of the Alberta Junior A Hockey League (AJHL), recording 22 points (12 goals and 10 assists) over 57 games. During the season, he also debuted with the Regina Pats of the Western Hockey League (WHL), playing one game. Unselected in the annual WHL Bantam Draft, Rypien earned a spot with the Pats as a walk-on. During his three-year tenure with Regina, he served as a team captain. As a WHL rookie in 2002–03, he scored 18 points (6 goals and 12 assists) over 50 games. In the following season, he improved to 45 points (19 goals and 26 assists) over 65 games. In his final year with the club, he set career highs with 22 goals, 29 assists and 51 points. He received three team awards, being chosen as the most valuable player, the Bill Hicke Award as the fans' choice as a most popular player, and the Molson Cup for having received the most three-star selections.

=== Professional career ===
Undrafted out of junior, Rypien was contacted by Craig Heisinger, general manager of the American Hockey League (AHL)'s Manitoba Moose, in his last season with the Pats. When Rypien's career with the Pats ended, Heisinger signed Rypien to an amateur tryout for the remainder of the 2004–05 AHL season. He recorded a goal and an assist over eight regular season games with the Moose, then helped the team to the Conference Finals of the 2005 playoffs with no points over fourteen contests. His play earned him an AHL contract to remain with the club for the 2005–06 season. As a result, Rypien attended NHL training camp with the Moose's parent club, the Vancouver Canucks, who released him back to the Moose for the season. Less than two months into the season, he signed a two-way contract with the Canucks on November 9, 2005. On December 19, he was called up by the Canucks and made his NHL debut two days later against the Edmonton Oilers. In the first period of the contest, he scored his first NHL goal against goaltender Jussi Markkanen. It was his first shot on his first shift. Playing in his fifth game with the club ten days later, he suffered a broken fibula against the Minnesota Wild. Upon recovering, he was returned to the Moose and finished the regular season with 15 points (9 goals and 6 assists) in 49 AHL games. He played in 13 playoff games with Manitoba and recorded a goal and an assist as the Moose were eliminated in the second round.

Competing for a roster spot during the Canucks' 2006 training camp, Rypien injured his thumb in a fight during a game against the Anaheim Ducks, sidelining him for two months. Upon recovering, he joined the Canucks in early-December 2006. In his first game back against the Colorado Avalanche on December 2, Rypien fought opposing forward Ian Laperrière. The following contest, against the Edmonton Oilers, he was injured once again, suffering a partially torn groin muscle. Once recovered he spent the remainder of the season with the Moose, recording 6 points (3 goals and 3 assists) in 14 games.

Rypien remained with the Moose to start the 2007–08 season, failing to make the Canucks' roster out of training camp. Within half a month, he was recalled by Vancouver. Playing against the Detroit Red Wings on October 24, 2007, Rypien broke a finger in his left hand. After being sidelined for 16 games, he was reassigned to the Moose on December 4. Splitting the remainder of the season between Manitoba and Vancouver, he was called up on two separate occasions (January 13–16 and February 26 – April 8, 2008) and finished the regular season with 14 points (3 goals and 11 assists) in 34 AHL games and 3 points (1 goal and 2 assists) in 22 NHL games. In the 2008 Calder Cup playoffs at the AHL level, he went pointless in six games as the Moose were eliminated in the first round by the Syracuse Crunch. During the off-season, Rypien re-signed as a restricted free agent with the Canucks on July 23, 2008.

In the following season, Rypien made the Canucks' line-up out of training camp for the first time in his career. After scoring two goals in the first five games in 2008–09, he suffered a sports hernia in October. Upon recovering, he was granted an indefinite leave of absence for personal reasons. The Canucks organization alluded to Rypien's history of injuries as the main reason for him not returning to the team. Assistant general manager Lorne Henning stated "It's just wearing on him now – it's frustrating for him. He just has to deal with the injuries … and wrap his head around it." It was later made known, following his death, that Rypien was struggling with clinical depression. He returned after a 70-game absence on March 31, 2009, in a contest against the Minnesota Wild. He appeared in 12 games for the Canucks in 2008–09, recording three goals and no assists. The season marked Vancouver's return to the playoffs after failing to qualify the previous season. After eliminating the St. Louis Blues in the first round, they were defeated in six games by the Chicago Blackhawks. Rypien appeared in all ten Canucks playoff games and recorded two points (both assists) while playing on the fourth line alongside Darcy Hordichuk and Ryan Johnson. He recorded his first playoff point in Game 4 of the second round against Chicago, assisting on a Hordichuk goal with a spin-o-rama pass.

Set to become an unrestricted free agent on July 1, 2009, Rypien re-signed to a two-year deal with the Canucks on May 27. Rypien continued to play on the Canucks' fourth line in 2009–10. During a game against the St. Louis Blues on December 31, 2009, he was automatically ejected after a fight with opponent Cam Janssen revealed his hands were illegally taped below the wrist to support a sprained finger. Avoiding major injury for the first time in his NHL career, he recorded career-highs of 8 points (4 goals and 4 assists) in 69 games.

In Rypien's first game of the 2010–11 season, an away game at the Xcel Energy Center against the Minnesota Wild on October 19, 2010, Rypien became infamously involved in a fan-related incident. After fighting opposing forward Brad Staubitz in the first period, the two players met again in the second period and were prepared to fight before being restrained by game officials. Before walking down the tunnel towards the Canucks' dressing room, Wild fan James Engquist called towards Rypien, "way to be a professional", while clapping. Rypien grabbed Engquist by his jersey before letting go and walking away. Rypien was suspended indefinitely pending an in-person disciplinary hearing about the altercation. The NHL then suspended Rypien for six games and fined the Canucks $25,000, while NHL Commissioner Gary Bettman called Engquist to apologize and offered him dinner and tickets to another game. In response, the fan stated that, although he had not yet hired a lawyer, he would be "definitely seeking legal representation". Rypien, meanwhile, told media he had apologized to his team and the NHL, describing his actions as "inexcusable".

After having served his suspension, Rypien struggled to remain in the Canucks' line-up and was made a regular healthy scratch. In late November 2010, the Canucks allowed him another personal leave of absence. At this time, it began to be widely speculated in the media that Rypien was suffering from mental health issues. While the Canucks organization withheld any details regarding Rypien's situation, general manager Mike Gillis stated publicly that "when you come to know somebody and realize they're a really good person…You don't only support them when they're at the top of their game…you support them when they're not feeling good about things or have other issues they have to deal with." On March 8, 2011, Rypien returned from his leave and was assigned to the Moose. The NHL waived the two-week limit allowed for a conditioning stint, allowing the Canucks to leave him with the Moose for the remainder of the season and avoid his salary cap hit. Rypien completed his final season as a Canuck with one assist over nine games, while also recording two assists in 11 AHL games. He also helped the Moose to the second round of the playoffs, recording one goal in seven post-season games.

During the off-season, Rypien and the Canucks parted ways as he became an unrestricted free agent on July 1, 2011. The following day, Rypien signed a one-year, US$700,000 contract with the Winnipeg Jets. The Jets were set to begin their inaugural season after franchise's Atlanta Thrashers relocated to Winnipeg, Manitoba. Under the same ownership as the Manitoba Moose, Rypien joined a familiar organization in returning to Winnipeg. Co-owner Mark Chipman recalled Rypien's signing as "one of the best days of [his] summer", adding that "Beyond the announcement of joining the National Hockey League…that's what really brought the [Jets' return] full circle". He was prepared to switch from jersey number 37 to 11 for the Jets, the same number he wore for the Pats during his junior career and the Moose when he first joined them.

== Playing style ==
Rypien earned and maintained a reputation as a tough and hardworking player. With the Canucks, he was a fourth-line forward, providing energy with his speed on the forecheck, aggression and fighting abilities – attributes that made him a fan favourite throughout his junior and professional career, but also contributed to his injury troubles. He regularly fought players well above his weight and height, including Sheldon Brookbank (6 ft 2 in (1.88 m), 215 pounds (98 kg)) and Hal Gill (6 ft 7 in (2.01 m), 240 pounds (110 kg)).

== Depression and suicide ==
Rypien's clinical depression was eventually made known to the Vancouver Canucks organization during their 2008 training camp; the team consequently coordinated his treatment for the remainder of his tenure with the team. Among his teammates, Canucks defenceman Kevin Bieksa was the first Rypien confided in regarding his depression. During his first leave of absence in 2008–09, Rypien disappeared. Bieksa met with Manitoba Moose general manager Craig Heisinger, with whom Rypien had a close personal relationship, in Edmonton and they drove to Rypien's Alberta home in search of him. Upon finding him, Bieksa brought him back to Vancouver to live with Bieksa's young family, where he became close to Bieksa's son which led him to decide to help kids. When Rypien returned from his leave, he was assigned by the Canucks to the Manitoba Moose. Upon arriving in Winnipeg, he publicly spoke about his absence, commenting that "doing the work I've done the last couple of months I've made a lot of gains as a person".

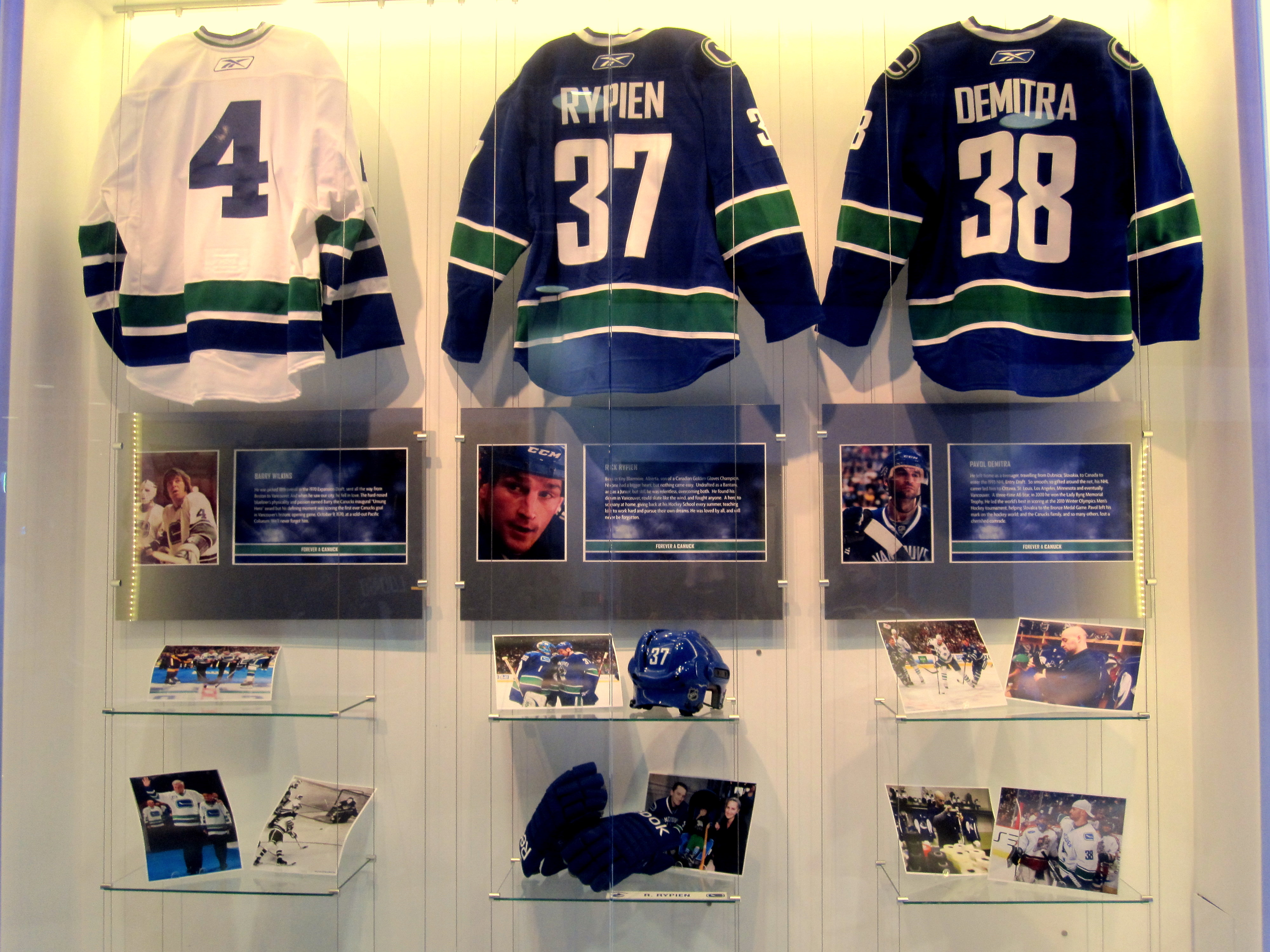
Following Rypien's death, the Canucks produced a display in the Rogers Arena concourse featuring his jersey, equipment and photos. (Also honoured in the display are Barry Wilkins (left) and Pavol Demitra (right), both of whom also died in the summer of 2011.)

A month and a half after Rypien signed with the Winnipeg Jets, a family member found him dead in his home in Crowsnest Pass, Alberta on August 15, 2011. Rypien had been scheduled for a flight to Winnipeg on August 14 to have his knee evaluated on the following day. When he did not make his appointment, Heisinger (who had since become the Jets' assistant general manager) attempted to locate him. Following his death, Heisinger told the media that Rypien had been suffering from depression for more than ten years. Jason Jaffray, a former Moose and Canucks teammate of Rypien's who had also recently signed with Winnipeg, expressed surprise at his death, explaining that while he was aware of his mental health, he felt he was "a new man and…the happiest [he'd] ever seen him."

Several hours after his death was announced, Canucks fans began assembling a memorial outside of Rogers Arena. Two days later, a fan-organized gathering of approximately 300 occurred at the memorial. On August 20, a memorial service was held for Rypien at Albert Stella Memorial Arena in Blairmore, where he had played his minor hockey. Bieksa was on hand as a pallbearer. He was one of numerous former teammates, managers and other figures from Rypien's hockey career in attendance. In the subsequent 2011–12 NHL season, the Canucks honoured Rypien with a ceremony before a home game against the New York Rangers on October 18. With Rypien's parents, step-parents, and brother on the ice, a four-minute tribute video was shown on the jumbotron. Bieksa presented Rypien's family a game-worn jersey from his last season as a Canuck. The team also announced a $50,000 donation in Rypien's memory to the BC Children's Hospital Foundation. The amount, which included contributions from the NHL Players Association's Goals & Dreams fund, was designated to fund a promotion strategy to help youth and young adults cope with mental health issues.

Rypien was one of three current or recent NHL players to have died in the 2011 off-season; the other two were New York Rangers enforcer Derek Boogaard and the recently retired Wade Belak. Following Boogaard and Rypien's deaths, NHL commissioner Gary Bettman told media that the league would look into its substance abuse and behavioural issue programs – initiatives that both players had been involved with (Boogaard's death was due to a lethal combination of alcohol and oxycodone). Alongside Boogard and Belak, Rypien was posthumously diagnosed with chronic traumatic encephalopathy.

Following Rypien's death, the Canucks helped launch an initiative to help raise awareness of mental illness. A collaborative project involving the team, their Canucks for Kids Foundation, the British Columbia Children's Hospital, Fraser Health and Provincial Health Services Authority, Mindcheck.ca was designed to help people recognize symptoms of mental illness and provided medical resources. The project was of particular significance to Bieksa, who took an active role in it, spoke publicly about the troubles Rypien faced, and encouraged people to seek help on the matter. Rypien's legacy also continues through Hockey Talks, a league-wide initiative where teams dedicate one home game a year to discussing mental health.

== Career statistics ==
			Regular season					Playoffs
Season	Team	League	GP	G	A	Pts	PIM	GP	G	A	Pts	PIM
2001–02	Crowsnest Pass Timberwolves	AJHL	57	12	10	22	143	—	—	—	—	—
2001–02	Regina Pats	WHL	1	0	0	0	0	—	—	—	—	—
2002–03	Regina Pats	WHL	50	6	12	18	159	5	1	1	2	21
2003–04	Regina Pats	WHL	65	19	26	45	186	4	0	1	1	18
2004–05	Regina Pats	WHL	63	22	29	51	148	—	—	—	—	—
2004–05	Manitoba Moose	AHL	8	1	1	2	5	14	0	0	0	35
2005–06	Manitoba Moose	AHL	49	9	6	15	122	13	1	1	2	22
2005–06	Vancouver Canucks	NHL	5	1	0	1	4	—	—	—	—	—
2006–07	Manitoba Moose	AHL	14	3	3	6	35	—	—	—	—	—
2006–07	Vancouver Canucks	NHL	2	0	0	0	5	—	—	—	—	—
2007–08	Manitoba Moose	AHL	34	3	11	14	81	6	0	0	0	10
2007–08	Vancouver Canucks	NHL	22	1	2	3	41	—	—	—	—	—
2008–09	Vancouver Canucks	NHL	12	3	0	3	19	10	0	2	2	40
2009–10	Vancouver Canucks	NHL	69	4	4	8	126	7	0	1	1	7
2010–11	Vancouver Canucks	NHL	9	0	1	1	31	—	—	—	—	—
2010–11	Manitoba Moose	AHL	11	0	2	2	9	7	1	0	1	10
NHL totals			119	9	7	16	226	17	0	3	3	47

- Source: NHL.com

== See also ==
- List of ice hockey players who died during their careers
- Hockey Talks
