= Peter McNamee (ice hockey) =

Canadian ice hockey player

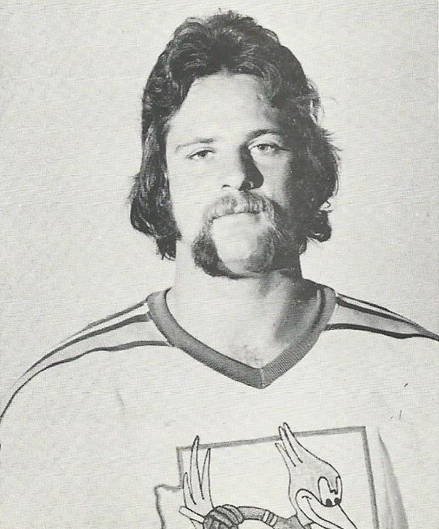
- Born: September 11, 1950 (age 75) Jamaica
- Height: 5 ft 11 in (180 cm)
- Weight: 170 lb (77 kg; 12 st 2 lb)
- Position: Right wing
- Played for: Vancouver Blazers; Phoenix Roadrunners; San Diego Mariners
- Playing career: 1973–1981

Peter Charles "Pete" McNamee (born September 11, 1950 in Christiana, Jamaica) is a Canadian retired professional ice hockey forward. He played 175 games in the World Hockey Association with the Vancouver Blazers, Phoenix Roadrunners, and San Diego Mariners.

== Career statistics ==
=== Regular season and playoffs ===
			Regular season					Playoffs
Season	Team	League	GP	G	A	Pts	PIM	GP	G	A	Pts	PIM
1967–68	Oshawa Generals	OHA	9	0	1	1	23	—	—	—	—	—
1970–71	University of Pennsylvania	ECAC	Statistics Unavailable
1972–73	University of Pennsylvania	ECAC	––	8	20	28	0	—	—	—	—	—
1973–74	Roanoke Valley Rebels	SHL	68	5	46	51	154	14	1	4	5	32
1973–74	Vancouver Blazers	WHA	3	0	0	0	0	—	—	—	—	—
1974–75	Tulsa Oilers	CHL	13	2	7	9	50	—	—	—	—	—
1974–75	Vancouver Blazers	WHA	11	2	1	3	15	—	—	—	—	—
1974–75	Phoenix Roadrunners	WHA	55	9	19	28	77	5	1	0	1	2
1975–76	Tucson Mavericks	CHL	7	1	2	3	24	—	—	—	—	—
1975–76	Phoenix Roadrunners	WHA	14	1	2	3	32	—	—	—	—	—
1975–76	San Diego Mariners	WHA	51	2	3	5	27	11	0	1	1	28
1976–77	Tidewater Sharks	SHL	24	6	18	24	19	—	—	—	—	—
1976–77	San Diego Mariners	WHA	41	3	6	9	38	2	0	0	0	2
1977–78	Rochester Americans	AHL	26	3	6	9	38	6	0	1	1	34
1977–78	Broome Dusters	AHL	54	3	23	26	125	—	—	—	—	—
1978–79	Tucson Rustlers	PHL	57	7	44	51	123	—	—	—	—	—
1979–80	Fort Worth Texans	CHL	39	2	11	13	126	—	—	—	—	—
1980–81	De Bisschop Amsterdam	Hlnd	Statistics Unavailable
WHA totals			175	17	31	48	189	18	1	1	2	32
