= Lauri Mononen =

Finnish ice hockey player

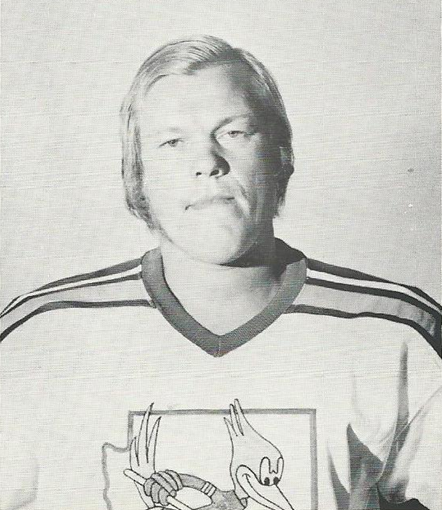
- Mononen in 1975 photo
- Born: 22 March 1950 Joensuu, Finland
- Died: 5 August 2018 (aged 68) Kesälahti, Finland
- Height: 6 ft 0 in (183 cm)
- Weight: 185 lb (84 kg; 13 st 3 lb)
- Position: Right wing
- Shot: Right
- Played for: Jokerit (SM-liiga); HIFK (SM-liiga); Phoenix Roadrunners (WHA); SC Bern (NLA)
- Playing career: 1969–1985

Lauri Ilmari Mononen (22 March 1950 – 5 August 2018) was a Finnish professional ice hockey winger. While playing for Phoenix Roadrunners in the World Hockey Association he was one of the first Finns to play professional hockey in North America. He played for a total of two seasons in the WHA. He also won the Finnish Championship once and the Swiss Championship once. He was twice chosen as best forward in the Finnish League and selected to the All-Star five three times (1969, 1972, 1975). He also competed in the men's tournament at the 1972 Winter Olympics.

His number 15 has been frozen by his former club, Jokipojat. He was inducted into the Finnish Hockey Hall of Fame as number 75.

== Career statistics ==
=== Regular season and playoffs ===
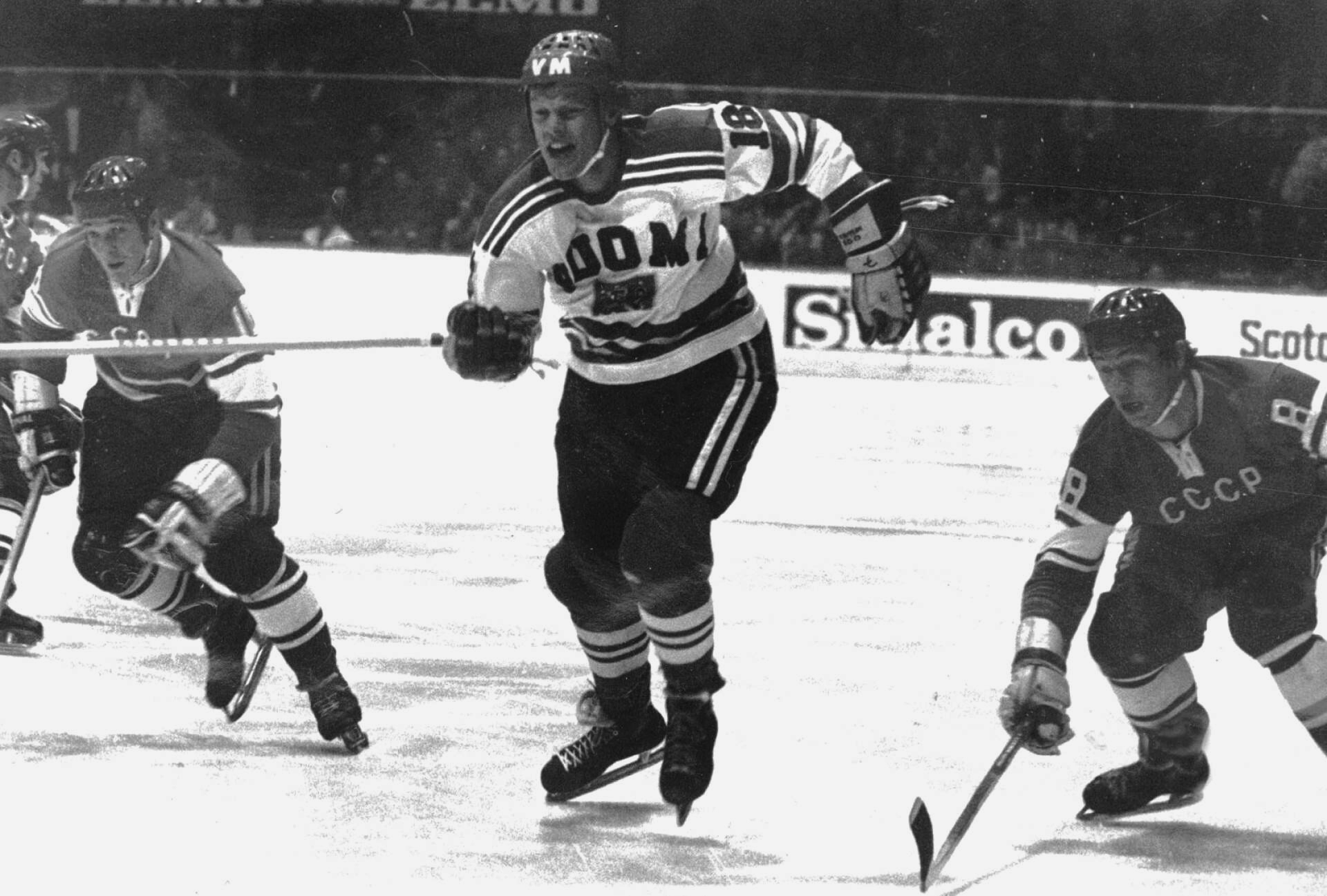
Mononen in 1972 for Finnish team

			Regular season					Playoffs
Season	Team	League	GP	G	A	Pts	PIM	GP	G	A	Pts	PIM
1970-71	Jokerit Helsinki	SM-sarja	26	16	10	26	14	—	—	—	—	—
1971-72	Karhu-Kissat Helsinki	SM-sarja	31	21	15	36	24	—	—	—	—	—
1972-73	Jokerit Helsinki	SM-sarja	36	20	16	36	27	—	—	—	—	—
1974-75	TPS Turku	SM-sarja	35	30	21	51	35	—	—	—	—	—
1975-76	Phoenix Roadrunners	WHA	75	15	21	36	19	5	1	3	4	2
1976-77	Oklahoma City Blazers	CHL	7	1	2	3	2	—	—	—	—	—
1976-77	Phoenix Roadrunners	WHA	67	21	29	50	10	—	—	—	—	—
1977-78	HIFK Helsinki	SM-liiga	34	27	12	39	41	—	—	—	—	—
1978-79	HIFK Helsinki	SM-liiga	16	1	0	1	28	—	—	—	—	—
1979-80	Bern SC	Swiss-A	?	28	9	37	0	—	—	—	—	—
1982-83	Kiekkoreipas Lahti	SM-liiga	8	1	3	4	12	—	—	—	—	—
WHA totals			142	36	50	86	29	5	1	3	4	2
