= Mike Stevens (ice hockey, born 1950) =

Canadian ice hockey player

- Born: October 13, 1950 (age 75) Winnipeg, Manitoba, Canada
- Height: 5 ft 11 in (180 cm)
- Weight: 188 lb (85 kg; 13 st 6 lb)
- Position: Defence
- Shot: Left
- Played for: Phoenix Roadrunners; Houston Aeros
- NHL draft: 65th overall, 1970; St. Louis Blues
- Playing career: 1974–1977

Mike Stevens (born October 13, 1950) is a Canadian former professional ice hockey defenseman who played in the World Hockey Association (WHA).

== Early life ==
Stevens was born in Winnipeg, Manitoba. He played college hockey for the Minnesota Duluth Bulldogs at the University of Minnesota Duluth.

== Career ==
Stevens was drafted in the fifth round of the 1970 NHL Amateur Draft by the St. Louis Blues. He played parts of two WHA seasons with the Phoenix Roadrunners and Houston Aeros. Stevens ended his career with the Oklahoma City Blazers.

== Career statistics ==
=== Regular season and playoffs ===
			Regular season					Playoffs
Season	Team	League	GP	G	A	Pts	PIM	GP	G	A	Pts	PIM
1970–71	University of Minnesota–Duluth	WCHA	32	0	12	12	55	––	––	––	––	––
1972–73	Denver Spurs	WHL	69	3	15	18	41	5	0	5	5	0
1973–74	Denver Spurs	WHL	71	3	25	28	67	––	––	––	––	––
1974–75	Phoenix Roadrunners	WHA	70	2	16	18	69	5	0	1	1	0
1975–76	Tucson Mavericks	CHL	68	3	15	18	163	––	––	––	––	––
1975–76	Houston Aeros	WHA	4	0	0	0	2	––	––	––	––	––
1976–77	Oklahoma City Blazers	CHL	23	4	12	16	33	––	––	––	––	––
WHA totals			74	2	16	18	71	5	0	1	1	0
