= Wendell Bennett =

Canadian ice hockey player

- Born: March 24, 1950 (age 75); Loon Lake, Saskatchewan, Canada
- Height: 6 ft 2 in (188 cm)
- Weight: 185 lb (84 kg; 13 st 3 lb)
- Position: Defence
- Shot: Right
- Played for: Phoenix Roadrunners
- NHL draft: 39th overall, 1970; New York Rangers
- Playing career: 1970–1979

Wendell James Bennett (born March 24, 1950) is a Canadian former professional ice hockey player who played in the World Hockey Association (WHA). Bennett played with the Phoenix Roadrunners during the 1974–75 WHA season. He was drafted in the third round of the 1970 NHL Amateur Draft by the New York Rangers.

== Career statistics ==
			Regular season					Playoffs
Season	Team	League	GP	G	A	Pts	PIM	GP	G	A	Pts	PIM
1967–68	Weyburn Red Wings	WCHL	42	1	7	8	34	—	—	—	—	—
1967–68	Saskatoon Blades	WCHL	1	0	0	0	0	—	—	—	—	—
1968–69	Weyburn Red Wings	SJHL	—	—	—	—	—	—	—	—	—	—
1969–70	Weyburn Red Wings	SJHL	—	7	21	28	86	—	—	—	—	—
1970–71	Kansas City Blues	CHL	43	9	11	20	55	—	—	—	—	—
1970–71	Omaha Knights	CHL	6	0	0	0	0	—	—	—	—	—
1971–72	Omaha Knights	CHL	70	13	13	26	89	—	—	—	—	—
1972–73	Omaha Knights	CHL	66	9	13	22	116	11	4	1	5	8
1973–74	Phoenix Roadrunners	WHL-Sr.	69	4	6	10	105	9	0	3	3	28
1974–75	Tulsa Oilers	CHL	11	0	1	1	2	—	—	—	—	—
1974–75	Phoenix Roadrunners	WHA	67	4	15	19	92	5	1	2	3	6
1977–78	Fort St. John Flyers	NorthPHL	—	—	—	—	—	—	—	—	—	—
1978–79	Phoenix Roadrunners	PHL-Sr.	59	3	22	25	209	—	—	—	—	—
WHA totals			67	4	15	19	92	5	1	2	3	6
CHL totals			196	31	38	69	262	11	4	1	5	8
