= Clay Hebenton =

Canadian ice hockey player

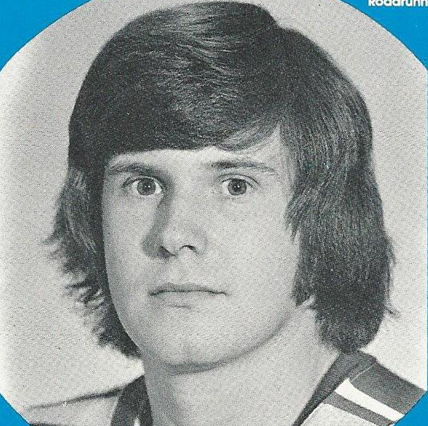
- Hebenton in 1976 card
- Born: February 20, 1953 (age 73) Victoria, British Columbia, Canada
- Height: 5 ft 10 in (178 cm)
- Weight: 200 lb (91 kg; 14 st 4 lb)
- Position: Goalie
- Played for: Phoenix Roadrunners
- NHL draft: 99th overall, 1973; Vancouver Canucks
- Playing career: 1973–1980

Clayton Andrew Hebenton (born February 20, 1953) is a Canadian former professional ice hockey goaltender.

Born in Victoria, British Columbia, Hebenton was drafted 99th overall by the Vancouver Canucks in the 1973 NHL Amateur Draft but never played in the National Hockey League. He played two seasons in the World Hockey Association with the Phoenix Roadrunners.

He is the son of Andy Hebenton, who played 630 consecutive games in the National Hockey League for the New York Rangers and the Boston Bruins.

== Career statistics ==
=== Regular season and playoffs ===
			Regular season									Playoffs
Season	Team	League	GP	W	L	T	MIN	GA	SO	GAA	SV%	GP	W	L	MIN	GA	SO	GAA	SV%
1973–74	Albuquerque Six-Guns	CHL	1	Statistics Unavailable
1975–76	Tucson Mavericks	CHL	7	1	5	0	379	40	0	6.33	–	–	–	–	–	–	–	–	–
1975–76	Phoenix Roadrunners	WHA	2	0	1	0	80	9	0	6.75	.813	–	–	–	–	–	–	–	–
1975–76	C.P.L. Luik	Hlnd	Statistics Unavailable
1976–77	Phoenix Roadrunners	WHA	56	17	29	3	3129	220	0	4.22	.875	–	–	–	–	–	–	–	–
1977–78	San Diego Mariners	PHL	37	Statistics Unavailable
1977–78	Broome Dusters	AHL	4	0	4	0	219	28	0	7.67	.804	–	–	–	–	–	–	–	–
1978–79	San Diego Hawks	PHL	41	Statistics Unavailable
1979–80	Syracuse Firebirds	AHL	3	0	2	0	127	12	0	5.67	.824	3	–	–	–	–	–	–	–
1979-80	Houston Apollos	CHL	18	6	8	3	1084	76	0	4.21	.858	–	–	–	–	–	–	–	–
1979-80	Baltimore Clippers	EHL	15	6	8	3	769	35	1	2.73	–	–	–	–	–	–	–	–	–
WHA totals			58	17	30	3	3209	229	0	4.28	.873	–	–	–	–	–	–	–	–
