= Hockey Talks =

Hockey Talks is an initiative within the National Hockey League (NHL) raising awareness of mental health issues. It was started by the Vancouver Canucks, after the death of Rick Rypien, a forward for the Canucks. The first year of Hockey Talks was held in 2013 and included seven Canadian NHL teams participating in the initiative. Currently 18 NHL clubs participate, hosting one home game in February to dedicating to sharing resources, and breaking the stigma around mental health.

== Overview ==
The program was created following the death of Rick Rypien, a forward for the Vancouver Canucks who died by suicide in August 2011. Rypien's death marked the third instance of an NHL player dying in 2011 due to issues related to mental health and substance abuse. In 2012, the NHL introduced the Hockey Talks initiative, aimed at promoting awareness and fostering discussions on mental health while reducing the stigma associated with the topic. The initiative was launched in collaboration with the Vancouver Canucks, who dedicated a home game to support mental health advocacy. Since its creation, multiple other teams have participated yearly by dedicating a game to the initiative.

== Participating teams ==
The following teams have participated in the Hockey Talks campaign, typically with a dedicated home game. These games typically feature on-ice ceremonies, moments of silence, mental health resource tables, and sometimes custom warm-up jerseys or helmets with Hockey Talks decals.

- Calgary Flames
- Carolina Hurricanes
- Minnesota Wild
- Ottawa Senators
- Pittsburgh Penguins
- Seattle Kraken
- Tampa Bay Lightning
- Vancouver Canucks
- Washington Capitals
- Winnipeg Jets
- Toronto Maple Leafs
- Edmonton Oilers
- Ottawa Senators
- Anaheim Ducks

== See also ==
- Rick Rypien
- Derek Boogaard
- Wade Belak
- You Can Play
- Bell Let's Talk
- Hockey Fights Cancer
