= Barry Merrell =

Canadian ice hockey player

- Born: May 16, 1945 (age 80) Dauphin, Manitoba, Canada
- Height: 6 ft 1 in (185 cm)
- Weight: 180 lb (82 kg; 12 st 12 lb)
- Position: Right wing
- Shot: Left
- Played for: Edmonton Oilers (WHA)
- Playing career: 1965–1977

Barry Lee Merrell (born May 16, 1945) is a former professional ice hockey right winger. He played ten games in the World Hockey Association with the Edmonton Oilers in the 1976–77 season.

== Career statistics ==
=== Regular season and playoffs ===
			Regular season					Playoffs
Season	Team	League	GP	G	A	Pts	PIM	GP	G	A	Pts	PIM
1963–64	Winnipeg Braves	MJHL	Statistics Unavailable
1964–65	Winnipeg Braves	MJHL	Statistics Unavailable
1965–66	Des Moines Oak Leafs	IHL	63	21	43	64	47	—	—	—	—	—
1965–66	Oklahoma City Blazers	CPHL	4	0	0	0	2	—	—	—	—	—
1966–67	Des Moines Oak Leafs	IHL	71	15	25	40	27	7	1	2	3	0
1967–68	Dayton Gems	IHL	56	37	37	74	12	10	6	3	9	0
1968–69	Dayton Gems	IHL	51	19	31	50	10	9	2	10	12	0
1969–70	Dayton Gems	IHL	72	33	49	82	8	13	3	10	13	0
1970–71	Dayton Gems	IHL	68	28	43	71	22	10	6	5	11	0
1971–72	Boston Braves	AHL	69	4	7	11	4	9	0	2	2	6
1972–73	Rochester Americans	AHL	74	32	40	72	51	6	2	8	10	2
1973–74	Rochester Americans	AHL	75	28	59	87	49	6	4	1	5	0
1974–75	Rochester Americans	AHL	74	44	41	85	32	12	4	9	13	4
1975–76	Rochester Americans	AHL	70	28	41	69	20	7	3	2	5	2
1976–77	Rochester Americans	AHL	29	2	6	8	6	12	2	7	9	4
1976–77	Edmonton Oilers	WHA	10	1	3	4	0	—	—	—	—	—
1977–78	Elmwood Millionaires	CSHL	--	8	8	16	4	—	—	—	—	—
WHA totals			10	1	3	4	0	—	—	—	—	—

Preceded by Murray Kuntz	American Hockey League leading goal scorer 1974–75 (tied with Doug Gibson, Peter Sullivan, and Jerry Holland)	Succeeded by Ron Andruff
