= Barry Wilkins =

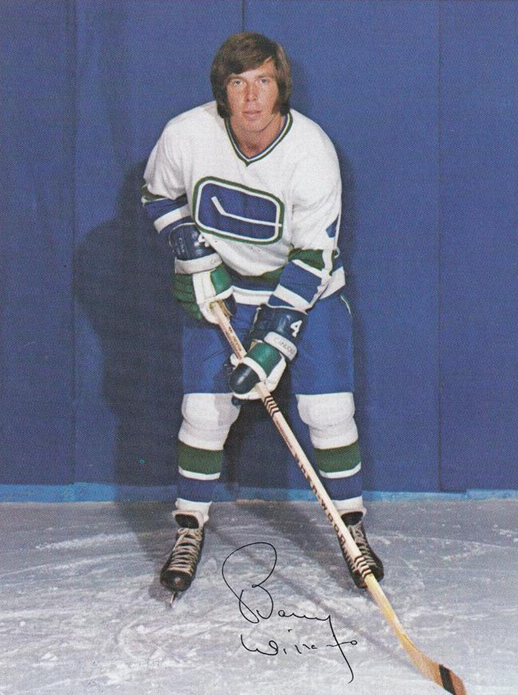
- Born: February 28, 1947 Toronto, Ontario, Canada
- Died: June 26, 2011 (aged 64) Chandler, Arizona, U.S.
- Height: 5 ft 11 in (180 cm)
- Weight: 190 lb (86 kg; 13 st 8 lb)
- Position: Defence
- Shot: Left
- Played for: Boston Bruins; Vancouver Canucks; Pittsburgh Penguins; Edmonton Oilers (WHA)
- Playing career: 1967–1976

Barry James Wilkins (February 28, 1947 – June 26, 2011) was a professional ice hockey player who played in the National Hockey League and the World Hockey Association during the 1960s and 1970s. He is best known for scoring the first-ever goal for the Vancouver Canucks in the NHL on October 9, 1970. Wilkins was born in Toronto, Ontario, and died at the age of 64 from lung cancer.

== Playing career ==
Wilkins was signed by the Boston Bruins as a teenager and came through their junior system where he was a teammate of Bobby Orr and Wayne Cashman with the Oshawa Generals. He was recalled from junior to make his NHL debut in 1966–67, playing a single game for the Bruins, and turned pro the following season. He would spend most of the next three seasons with the Oklahoma City Blazers, Boston's top minor-league affiliate, but found it difficult to crack an increasingly deep Bruin roster. He scored his first NHL goal in his only appearance during the 1968–69 season, and appeared in 6 games for the 1969–70 Bruin team which would ultimately win the Stanley Cup.

By the 1969–70 season, Wilkins was a dominant defender in the CHL with Oklahoma City, finishing the year with 52 points and 204 penalty minutes, and he would receive his big break when he was selected by the Vancouver Canucks in the 1970 NHL Expansion Draft. He started his Canuck career with a bang, scoring the team's first-ever goal (one of only five he scored all season) in their first game, against the Los Angeles Kings on October 9, 1970.

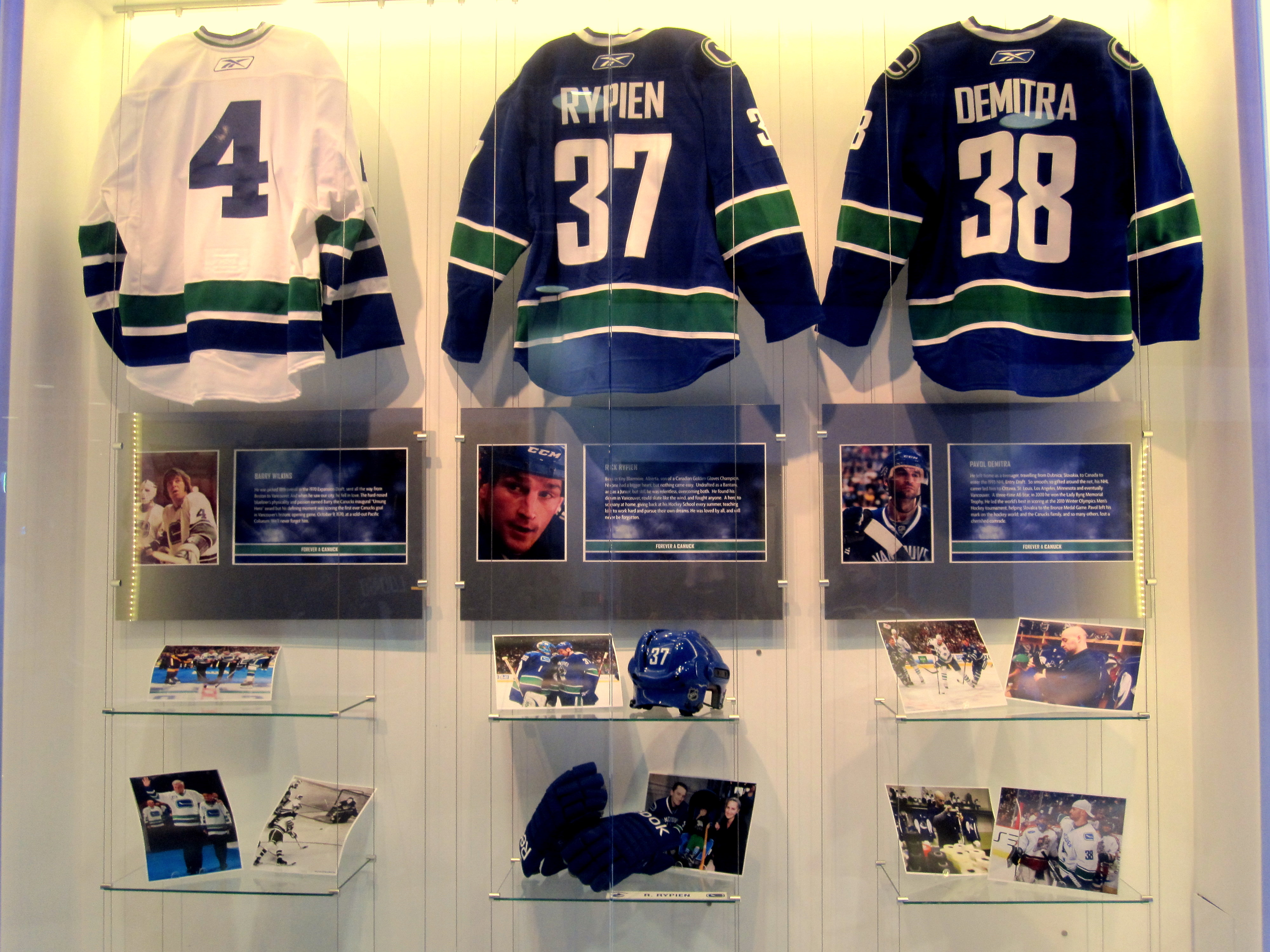
Following Wilkins' death in June 2011, the Canucks assembled a display, featuring his jersey (left), alongside former Vancouver players Rick Rypien and Pavol Demitra, both of whom also died that year.

Wilkins would be one of Vancouver's top defenders for the first several years of the franchise's history. After a disappointing 1971–72 campaign, he bounced back in 1972–73 to record a career-high 11 goals and 28 points, and he was named the club's top defender. In 1973–74, he recorded three goals and 28 assists for 31 points while continuing to provide his usual high level of hard-nosed defensive play.

Early in the 1974–75 NHL season, Wilkins was dealt to the Pittsburgh Penguins for Ab DeMarco, Jr., leaving André Boudrias as the last remaining original Canuck (Wilkins was also the last remaining player selected by the team in the 1970 Expansion Draft). In Pittsburgh, Wilkins would have the best offensive year of his career, finishing the season with five goals and 35 points in just 66 games between the Canucks and Penguins. He would have another solid year in 1975–76, registering 27 points for the Penguins.

Wilkins' NHL career came to an abrupt end when he jumped to the rival WHA for the 1976–77 season to play for the Edmonton Oilers. After a year with the Oilers, he was dealt to the Indianapolis Racers for 1977–78. After spending one last professional season in the AHL, Wilkins retired in 1979.

Wilkins appeared in 418 NHL games, recording 27 goals and 125 assists for 152 points, along with 663 penalty minutes. He also appeared in 130 WHA contests, notching six goals and 45 assists for 51 points, along with 154 penalty minutes.

== Career statistics ==
			Regular season					Playoffs
Season	Team	League	GP	G	A	Pts	PIM	GP	G	A	Pts	PIM
1964–65	Niagara Falls Flyers	OHA-Jr.	51	2	12	14	45	9	0	0	0	2
1964–65	Niagara Falls Flyers	M-Cup	—	—	—	—	—	3	0	2	2	0
1965–66	Oshawa Generals	OHA-Jr.	47	8	11	19	128	17	3	7	10	36
1965–66	Oshawa Generals	M-Cup	—	—	—	—	—	14	2	6	8	37
1966–67	Oshawa Generals	OHA-Jr.	40	8	21	29	69	—	—	—	—	—
1966–67	Boston Bruins	NHL	1	0	0	0	0	—	—	—	—	—
1967–68	Oklahoma City Blazers	CPHL	69	6	27	33	146	7	1	0	1	12
1968–69	Boston Bruins	NHL	1	1	0	1	0	—	—	—	—	—
1968–69	Oklahoma City Blazers	CHL	69	14	32	46	164	12	3	7	10	26
1969–70	Boston Bruins	NHL	6	0	0	0	2	—	—	—	—	—
1969–70	Oklahoma City Blazers	CHL	61	11	41	52	204	—	—	—	—	—
1970–71	Vancouver Canucks	NHL	70	5	18	23	131	—	—	—	—	—
1971–72	Vancouver Canucks	NHL	45	2	5	7	65	—	—	—	—	—
1972–73	Vancouver Canucks	NHL	76	11	17	28	133	—	—	—	—	—
1973–74	Vancouver Canucks	NHL	78	3	28	31	123	—	—	—	—	—
1974–75	Vancouver Canucks	NHL	7	0	1	1	6	—	—	—	—	—
1974–75	Pittsburgh Penguins	NHL	59	5	29	34	97	3	0	0	0	0
1975–76	Pittsburgh Penguins	NHL	75	0	27	27	106	3	0	1	1	4
1976–77	Edmonton Oilers	WHA	51	4	24	28	75	4	0	1	1	2
1977–78	Indianapolis Racers	WHA	79	2	21	23	79	—	—	—	—	—
1978–79	Philadelphia Firebirds	AHL	46	5	12	17	51	—	—	—	—	—
CPHL/CHL totals			199	31	100	131	514	19	4	7	11	38
NHL totals			418	27	125	152	663	6	0	1	1	4
WHA totals			130	6	45	51	154	4	0	1	1	2
