= Don Borgeson =

Canadian ice hockey player

- Born: May 20, 1945 (age 81) North Battleford, Saskatchewan, Canada
- Height: 5 ft 11 in (180 cm)
- Weight: 175 lb (79 kg; 12 st 7 lb)
- Position: Left wing
- Shot: Left
- Played for: WHA; New England Whalers; Denver Spurs; Ottawa Civics; Phoenix Roadrunners.
- NHL draft: Undrafted
- Playing career: 1965–1979

Donald Gary Borgeson (born May 20, 1945) is a Canadian retired professional ice hockey forward. He would play 145 games in the World Hockey Association with the New England Whalers and Phoenix Roadrunners.

== Career statistics ==
=== Regular season and playoffs ===
			Regular season					Playoffs
Season	Team	League	GP	G	A	Pts	PIM	GP	G	A	Pts	PIM
1965–66	Nelson Maple Leafs	WIHL	Statistics Unavailable
1967–68	Nelson Maple Leafs	WIHL	44	25	15	40	83	––	––	––	––	––
1968–69	Nashville Dixie Flyers	EHL	72	37	39	76	90	14	9	4	13	10
1969–70	Nashville Dixie Flyers	EHL	74	40	38	78	101	––	––	––	––	––
1970–71	Nashville Dixie Flyers	EHL	71	50	45	95	52	4	3	1	4	2
1970–71	Kansas City Blues	CHL	4	1	1	2	0	––	––	––	––	––
1971–72	Denver Spurs	WHL	72	16	21	37	50	9	2	3	5	25
1972–73	Denver Spurs	WHL	71	31	41	72	66	5	2	3	5	2
1973–74	Providence Reds	AHL	72	21	29	50	28	14	2	4	6	4
1974–75	Phoenix Roadrunners	WHA	74	29	28	57	38	5	0	1	1	2
1975–76	Denver Spurs/Ottawa Civics	WHA	40	21	16	37	24	––	––	––	––	––
1975–76	New England Whalers	WHA	31	9	8	17	4	3	1	1	2	0
1976–77	Spokane Flyers	WIHL	––	33	23	56	44	––	––	––	––	––
1977–78	Spokane Flyers	WIHL	––	29	47	76	0	––	––	––	––	––
1978–79	Phoenix Roadrunners	PHL	60	37	28	65	43	––	––	––	––	––
WHA totals			145	59	52	111	66	8	1	2	3	2
