= Phoenix Roadrunners (WHA) =

Former ice hockey team of the World Hockey Association

- City: Phoenix, Arizona
- League: Western Hockey League (1967–74); World Hockey Association (1974–77)
- Operated: 1974–1977
- Home arena: Arizona Veterans Memorial Coliseum
- Media: KPHO-TV; KOY

Franchise history
- 1958–1959: Spokane Spokes
- 1959–1963: Spokane Comets
- 1963–1964: Denver Invaders
- 1964–1967: Victoria Maple Leafs
- 1967–1974: Phoenix Roadrunners (WHL)
- 1974–1977: Phoenix Roadrunners (WHA)

The Phoenix Roadrunners were a professional ice hockey team in the World Hockey Association (WHA) from 1974 to 1977. They played at Arizona Veterans Memorial Coliseum in Phoenix, Arizona. The organization folded for financial reasons before the remaining teams in the WHA merged with the NHL in 1979. The colors of the team were blue and gold.

In 1996 the Winnipeg Jets, a former WHA franchise, moved to Phoenix and became the Phoenix Coyotes. In 2016, the Coyotes purchased their AHL affiliate (the Springfield Falcons), and moved them to Tucson. The Tucson Roadrunners use a logo very similar to the WHA Roadrunners.

== History ==
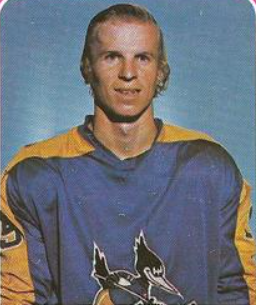
Ftorek with the Roadrunners in 1975.

The franchise originally competed in the Western Hockey League (WHL) from 1967 to 1974 after being moved from Victoria, British Columbia, where they had played for the three previous seasons as the Maple Leafs.

In 1974, the Roadrunners joined the WHA with their roster mostly intact when the WHL ceased operations. The Roadrunners achieved relative success during their first two WHA seasons, but lack of financial success resulted in the removal of local favorite Sandy Hucul as coach and his replacement with Al Rollins, who was disliked by Phoenix hockey fans. Rollins did not succeed in improving the team's fortunes. At one point, the team was forced to sell players just to pay the bills. The Roadrunners finally gave up and folded at the end of its third season. The last active WHA Roadrunner in major professional hockey was the team's star player, Robbie Ftorek, who retired from the NHL after the 1984–85 season.

== Notable players ==
- Robbie Ftorek – (WHA MVP 1977)

== Season-by-season record ==
Note: GP = Games played, W = Wins, L = Losses, T = Ties, Pts = Points, GF = Goals for, GA = Goals against, PIM = Penalties in minutes

Season	GP	W	L	T	Pts	GF	GA	PIM	Finish	Playoffs
1974–75	78	39	31	8	86	300	265	1388	4th, Western	Lost quarterfinals (Nordiques)
1975–76	78	39	35	4	82	302	287	1292	2nd, Western	Lost preliminaries (Mariners)
1976–77	80	28	48	4	60	281	383	915	6th, Western	Did not qualify
Totals	236	106	114	16	228	883	935	3595		

== See also ==
- List of Phoenix Roadrunners (WHA) players
