= 1975–76 Denver Spurs/Ottawa Civics season =

1975–76 Denver Spurs/Ottawa Civics
- Division: 6th Canadian
- 1975–76 record: 14–26–1
- Home record: 8–14–1
- Road record: 6–12–0
- Goals for: 134
- Goals against: 172

Team information
- General manager: Jean-Guy Talbot
- Coach: Jean-Guy Talbot
- Captain: Ralph Backstrom
- Alternate captains: Jean-Paul LeBlanc; Darryl Maggs; Larry Bignell
- Arena: McNichols Sports Arena (Oct.–Dec.); Ottawa Civic Centre (Jan.)

Team leaders
- Goals: Ralph Backstrom; Don Borgeson (21)
- Assists: Ralph Backstrom (29)
- Points: Ralph Backstrom (50)
- Penalty minutes: Rick Morris (58)
- Wins: Bob Johnson (8)
- Goals against average: Cam Newton (3.66)

The 1975–76 Denver Spurs/Ottawa Civics season was the ill-fated single season of operation of the Denver Spurs/Ottawa Civics in the World Hockey Association (WHA). The Spurs began the season in Denver, Colorado but relocated to Ottawa, Ontario before giving up for good after 41 games.

== Regular season ==
=== Final standings ===
Canadian Division	GP	W	L	T	Pts	GF	GA	PIM
Winnipeg Jets	81	52	27	2	106	345	254	940
Quebec Nordiques	81	50	27	4	104	371	316	1654
Calgary Cowboys	80	41	35	4	86	307	282	1064
Edmonton Oilers	81	27	49	5	59	268	345	991
Toronto Toros	81	24	52	5	53	335	398	1099
Denver Spurs / Ottawa Civics+	41	14	26	1	29	134	172	536

+team started season in Western Division when playing in Denver; transferred by league to Canadian Division shortly after moving to Ottawa.

== Schedule and results ==
1975–76 regular season
October

Game	Result	Date	Score	Opponent	Record
1	L	October 10, 1975	1–7	Indianapolis Racers (1975–76)	0–1–0
2	L	October 16, 1975	3–7	Winnipeg Jets (1975–76)	0–2–0
3	W	October 17, 1975	5–4	@ Phoenix Roadrunners (1975–76)	1–2–0
4	W	October 18, 1975	6–4	@ Indianapolis Racers (1975–76)	2–2–0
5	W	October 22, 1975	2–1	@ Calgary Cowboys (1975–76)	3–2–0
6	L	October 24, 1975	2–5	@ Winnipeg Jets (1975–76)	3–3–0
7	L	October 30, 1975	2–3	Phoenix Roadrunners (1975–76)	3–4–0

November

Game	Result	Date	Score	Opponent	Record
8	L	November 1, 1975	2–3	Houston Aeros (1975–76)	3–5–0
9	T	November 4, 1975	2–2	Cleveland Crusaders (1975–76)	3–5–1
10	L	November 6, 1975	3–5	Quebec Nordiques (1975–76)	3–6–1
11	L	November 7, 1975	2–3 OT	San Diego Mariners (1975–76)	3–7–1
12	L	November 9, 1975	2–3	@ Houston Aeros (1975–76)	3–8–1
13	L	November 13, 1975	8–11	Toronto Toros (1975–76)	3–9–1
14	W	November 15, 1975	5–4 OT	Cleveland Crusaders (1975–76)	4–9–1
15	W	November 18, 1975	6–3	Edmonton Oilers (1975–76)	5–9–1
16	L	November 20, 1975	1–5	@ San Diego Mariners (1975–76)	5–10–1
17	L	November 21, 1975	2–6	Calgary Cowboys (1975–76)	5–11–1
18	W	November 23, 1975	5–3	Cincinnati Stingers (1975–76)	6–11–1
19	W	November 26, 1975	3–0	@ Cleveland Crusaders (1975–76)	7–11–1
20	L	November 28, 1975	3–7	@ New England Whalers (1975–76)	7–12–1
21	W	November 30, 1975	4–2	@ Indianapolis Racers (1975–76)	8–12–1

December

Game	Result	Date	Score	Opponent	Record
22	L	December 2, 1975	3–4 OT	Winnipeg Jets (1975–76)	8–13–1
23	L	December 5, 1975	3–4	@ Minnesota Fighting Saints (1975–76)	8–14–1
24	L	December 6, 1975	2–3	@ Cincinnati Stingers (1975–76)	8–15–1
25	W	December 7, 1975	5–1	New England Whalers (1975–76)	9–15–1
26	W	December 9, 1975	6–3	Cleveland Crusaders (1975–76)	10–15–1
27	L	December 13, 1975	1–4	Phoenix Roadrunners (1975–76)	10–16–1
28	W	December 16, 1975	3–2 OT	Cincinnati Stingers (1975–76)	11–16–1
29	W	December 19, 1975	6–3	San Diego Mariners (1975–76)	12–16–1
30	L	December 23, 1975	4–5	Minnesota Fighting Saints (1975–76)	12–17–1
31	L	December 26, 1975	4–9	@ Houston Aeros (1975–76)	12–18–1
32	L	December 27, 1975	0–10	@ Phoenix Roadrunners (1975–76)	12–19–1
33	L	December 28, 1975	2–5	Phoenix Roadrunners (1975–76)	12–20–1
34	W	December 30, 1975	2–1 OT	Indianapolis Racers (1975–76)	13–20–1

January

Game	Result	Date	Score	Opponent	Record
35	L	January 2, 1976	1–2	@ Cincinnati Stingers (1975–76)	13–21–1
36	L	January 3, 1976	2–4	@ Houston Aeros (1975–76)	13–22–1
37	W	January 4, 1976	5–2	@ Minnesota Fighting Saints (1975–76)	14–22–1
38	L	January 7, 1976	2–3	New England Whalers (1975–76)	14–23–1
39	L	January 10, 1976	5–8	@ Phoenix Roadrunners (1975–76)	14–24–1
40	L	January 11, 1976	5–6 OT	@ Winnipeg Jets (1975–76)	14–25–1
41	L	January 15, 1976	4–5 OT	Houston Aeros (1975–76)	14–26–1

Legend: Win (2 points) Loss (0 points) Tie (1 point)

== Player statistics ==
Regular season
Scoring

Player	Pos	GP	G	A	Pts	PIM	+/-	PPG	SHG	GWG
Ralph Backstrom	C	41	21	29	50	14	9	8	0	4
Don Borgeson	LW	40	21	16	37	24	7	5	0	1
Gary MacGregor	C	38	16	14	30	18	-2	3	0	0
Jim Sherrit	C	40	11	19	30	16	-4	0	0	0
Darryl Maggs	D	41	4	23	27	42	-9	1	0	1
Mark Lomenda	RW	37	6	16	22	11	-6	5	0	0
Frank Rochon	LW	41	11	10	21	10	-18	3	0	0
Rick Morris	LW	41	9	6	15	58	-19	0	2	1
Bob Liddington	LW	35	7	8	15	14	-2	1	0	0
John Arbour	D	35	2	13	15	49	-14	0	0	0
Barry Legge	D	40	6	8	14	15	-11	4	0	1
Brian Lavender	LW	37	5	6	11	35	-15	0	0	0
Larry Bignell	D	41	5	5	10	43	-4	0	0	0
Peter Mara	C	40	3	7	10	8	-15	0	0	0
Bryon Baltimore	D	41	1	8	9	32	-13	0	0	0
Gary Bredin	RW	17	4	3	7	2	-7	1	0	0
Jean-Paul LeBlanc	C	15	1	5	6	25	-7	0	0	0
Ron Delorme	C	22	1	3	4	28	-3	0	0	0
Larry Mavety	D	14	0	4	4	14	-12	0	0	0
Keith Kokkola	D	16	0	3	3	40	-2	0	0	0
Bob Johnson	G	24	0	1	1	7	0	0	0	0
Lynn Zimmerman	G	8	0	1	1	0	0	0	0	0
Brian Gibbons	D	2	0	0	0	0	-2	0	0	0
Bill Goldthorpe	LW	12	0	0	0	31	-5	0	0	0
Chris Grigg	G	2	0	0	0	0	0	0	0	0
Cam Newton	G	10	0	0	0	0	0	0	0	0
Ed Pizunski	RW	1	0	0	0	0	0	0	0	0
Jan Popiel	LW	1	0	0	0	2	0	0	0	0
Nick Sanza	G	1	0	0	0	0	0	0	0	0

Goaltending

Player	MIN	GP	W	L	T	GA	GAA	SO
Bob Johnson	1345	24	8	14	1	88	3.93	0
Cam Newton	573	10	4	6	0	35	3.66	1
Lynn Zimmerman	495	8	2	6	0	31	3.76	0
Chris Grigg	80	2	0	0	0	13	9.75	0
Nick Sanza	20	1	0	0	0	5	15.00	0
Team:	2513	41	14	26	1	172	4.11	1

Note: Pos = Position; GP = Games played; G = Goals; A = Assists; Pts = Points; +/- = plus/minus; PIM = Penalty minutes; PPG = Power-play goals; SHG = Short-handed goals; GWG = Game-winning goals
MIN = Minutes played; W = Wins; L = Losses; T = Ties; GA = Goals-against; GAA = Goals-against average; SO = Shutouts;

== Draft picks ==
Denver's draft picks at the 1975 WHA Amateur Draft.

Round	#	Player	Nationality	College/Junior/Club team (League)
1	4	Mel Bridgman (C)	Canada	Victoria Cougars (WCHL)
3	34	Ron Delorme (RW)	Canada	Lethbridge Broncos (WCHL)
4	49	Andre Leduc (D)	Canada	Sherbrooke Castors (QMJHL)
5	64	Nick Sanza (G)	Canada	Sherbrooke Castors (QMJHL)
6	77	Greg Miazga (F)	Canada	Victoria Cougars (WCHL)
7	91	Rick Martin (RW)	Canada	London Knights (OHA)
10	128	Dave Bossy (D)	Canada	University of Notre Dame (WCHA)
11	141	Andy Whitby (F)	Canada	Oshawa Generals (OHA)

== See also ==
- 1975–76 WHA season
