= 1975–76 Indianapolis Racers season =

1975–76 Indianapolis Racers
- Division: 1st East
- 1975–76 record: 35–39–6
- Home record: 21–17–2
- Road record: 14–22–4
- Goals for: 245
- Goals against: 247

Team information
- Coach: Gerry Moore (1–4–0); Jacques Demers (34–35–6)
- Captain: Ken Block
- Alternate captains: Dick Proceviat; Bob Sicinski; Frank Rochon
- Arena: Market Square Arena

Team leaders
- Goals: Nick Harbaruk; Reg Thomas (23)
- Assists: Pat Stapleton (40)
- Points: Pat Stapleton (45)
- Penalty minutes: Kim Clackson (351)
- Wins: Michel Dion (14)
- Goals against average: Jim Park (2.41)

The 1975–76 Indianapolis Racers season was the Indianapolis Racers' second season of operation in the World Hockey Association (WHA). The Racers made the playoffs this season, losing in the first round to the New England Whalers.

== Regular season ==
=== Final standings ===
Eastern Division	GP	W	L	T	Pts	GF	GA	PIM
Indianapolis Racers	80	35	39	6	76	245	247	1301
Cleveland Crusaders	80	35	40	5	75	273	279	1356
New England Whalers	80	33	40	7	73	255	290	1012
Cincinnati Stingers	80	35	44	1	71	285	340	1344

== Schedule and results ==
1975–76 regular season
October

Game	Result	Date	Score	Opponent	Record
1	W	October 10, 1975	7–1	@ Denver Spurs/Ottawa Civics (1975–76)	1–0–0
2	L	October 12, 1975	5–6	@ Edmonton Oilers (1975–76)	1–1–0
3	L	October 14, 1975	3–5	@ Calgary Cowboys (1975–76)	1–2–0
4	L	October 16, 1975	0–3	@ San Diego Mariners (1975–76)	1–3–0
5	L	October 18, 1975	4–6	Denver Spurs/Ottawa Civics (1975–76)	1–4–0
6	L	October 21, 1975	1–2	Minnesota Fighting Saints (1975–76)	1–5–0
7	W	October 23, 1975	4–0	Houston Aeros (1975–76)	2–5–0
8	W	October 26, 1975	4–3	Edmonton Oilers (1975–76)	3–5–0
9	L	October 30, 1975	5–7	Calgary Cowboys (1975–76)	3–6–0

November

Game	Result	Date	Score	Opponent	Record
10	L	November 1, 1975	2–5	Quebec Nordiques (1975–76)	3–7–0
11	W	November 4, 1975	4–3	Toronto Toros (1975–76)	4–7–0
12	L	November 8, 1975	2–3 OT	@ Quebec Nordiques (1975–76)	4–8–0
13	L	November 15, 1975	7–9	@ Minnesota Fighting Saints (1975–76)	4–9–0
14	L	November 16, 1975	1–2	@ Winnipeg Jets (1975–76)	4–10–0
15	W	November 17, 1975	6–2	@ Toronto Toros (1975–76)	5–10–0
16	W	November 19, 1975	3–1	New England Whalers (1975–76)	6–10–0
17	L	November 25, 1975	1–4	@ Houston Aeros (1975–76)	6–11–0
18	W	November 27, 1975	3–1	Winnipeg Jets (1975–76)	7–11–0
19	W	November 28, 1975	3–1	@ Cleveland Crusaders (1975–76)	8–11–0
20	W	November 29, 1975	3–2	@ New England Whalers (1975–76)	9–11–0
21	L	November 30, 1975	2–4	Denver Spurs/Ottawa Civics (1975–76)	9–12–0

December

Game	Result	Date	Score	Opponent	Record
22	W	December 4, 1975	7–1	Cincinnati Stingers (1975–76)	10–12–0
23	W	December 6, 1975	3–2	Cleveland Crusaders (1975–76)	11–12–0
24	W	December 10, 1975	2–1	@ Phoenix Roadrunners (1975–76)	12–12–0
25	T	December 11, 1975	3–3	@ San Diego Mariners (1975–76)	12–12–1
26	L	December 12, 1975	2–4	@ Houston Aeros (1975–76)	12–13–1
27	T	December 14, 1975	2–2	New England Whalers (1975–76)	12–13–2
28	L	December 16, 1975	1–3	Edmonton Oilers (1975–76)	12–14–2
29	L	December 18, 1975	1–7	@ Phoenix Roadrunners (1975–76)	12–15–2
30	W	December 19, 1975	5–4 OT	Cleveland Crusaders (1975–76)	13–15–2
31	L	December 20, 1975	3–5	@ Cleveland Crusaders (1975–76)	13–16–2
32	W	December 27, 1975	2–1	Cincinnati Stingers (1975–76)	14–16–2
33	L	December 28, 1975	1–4	@ Cincinnati Stingers (1975–76)	14–17–2
34	L	December 30, 1975	1–2 OT	@ Denver Spurs/Ottawa Civics (1975–76)	14–18–2

January

Game	Result	Date	Score	Opponent	Record
35	L	January 2, 1976	0–2	San Diego Mariners (1975–76)	14–19–2
36	L	January 3, 1976	1–3	@ Minnesota Fighting Saints (1975–76)	14–20–2
37	W	January 4, 1976	3–2	New England Whalers (1975–76)	15–20–2
38	L	January 6, 1976	0–3	@ Edmonton Oilers (1975–76)	15–21–2
39	L	January 7, 1976	1–3	@ Calgary Cowboys (1975–76)	15–22–2
40	W	January 9, 1976	2–1 OT	@ Winnipeg Jets (1975–76)	16–22–2
41	L	January 11, 1976	3–4	@ Cleveland Crusaders (1975–76)	16–23–2
42	L	January 15, 1976	1–3	Cleveland Crusaders (1975–76)	16–24–2
43	L	January 17, 1976	0–4	Cincinnati Stingers (1975–76)	16–25–2
44	L	January 21, 1976	2–3	@ Quebec Nordiques (1975–76)	16–26–2
45	W	January 23, 1976	4–3	Cincinnati Stingers (1975–76)	17–26–2
46	W	January 25, 1976	4–2	Cleveland Crusaders (1975–76)	18–26–2
47	L	January 28, 1976	4–6	@ New England Whalers (1975–76)	18–27–2
48	L	January 29, 1976	5–6 OT	Minnesota Fighting Saints (1975–76)	18–28–2
49	W	January 30, 1976	2–1	Houston Aeros (1975–76)	19–28–2

February

Game	Result	Date	Score	Opponent	Record
50	L	February 1, 1976	1–2	Winnipeg Jets (1975–76)	19–29–2
51	W	February 5, 1976	4–2	Quebec Nordiques (1975–76)	20–29–2
52	L	February 6, 1976	3–4	@ Houston Aeros (1975–76)	20–30–2
53	W	February 7, 1976	5–1	Cincinnati Stingers (1975–76)	21–30–2
54	W	February 11, 1976	2–1	Phoenix Roadrunners (1975–76)	22–30–2
55	L	February 13, 1976	3–4 OT	Calgary Cowboys (1975–76)	22–31–2
56	L	February 14, 1976	2–3	@ Cincinnati Stingers (1975–76)	22–32–2
57	L	February 15, 1976	2–3	San Diego Mariners (1975–76)	22–33–2
58	W	February 19, 1976	10–3	New England Whalers (1975–76)	23–33–2
59	L	February 21, 1976	2–3	@ Cleveland Crusaders (1975–76)	23–34–2
60	L	February 22, 1976	5–6	Phoenix Roadrunners (1975–76)	23–35–2
61	T	February 28, 1976	4–4	@ New England Whalers (1975–76)	23–35–3
62	W	February 29, 1976	5–2	@ Cincinnati Stingers (1975–76)	24–35–3

March

Game	Result	Date	Score	Opponent	Record
63	L	March 2, 1976	2–5	@ Phoenix Roadrunners (1975–76)	24–36–3
64	W	March 4, 1976	3–1	Cincinnati Stingers (1975–76)	25–36–3
65	W	March 6, 1976	3–2	@ Cincinnati Stingers (1975–76)	26–36–3
66	L	March 7, 1976	1–5	Cleveland Crusaders (1975–76)	26–37–3
67	W	March 11, 1976	3–1	Toronto Toros (1975–76)	27–37–3
68	W	March 12, 1976	6–3	@ Cincinnati Stingers (1975–76)	28–37–3
69	W	March 13, 1976	6–4	Phoenix Roadrunners (1975–76)	29–37–3
70	W	March 17, 1976	5–2	@ New England Whalers (1975–76)	30–37–3
71	T	March 18, 1976	4–4	San Diego Mariners (1975–76)	30–37–4
72	T	March 20, 1976	1–1	@ New England Whalers (1975–76)	30–37–5
73	T	March 23, 1976	8–8	@ San Diego Mariners (1975–76)	30–37–6
74	W	March 25, 1976	4–3 OT	Houston Aeros (1975–76)	31–37–6
75	W	March 26, 1976	3–2	@ Cleveland Crusaders (1975–76)	32–37–6
76	W	March 28, 1976	3–1	@ New England Whalers (1975–76)	33–37–6

April

Game	Result	Date	Score	Opponent	Record
77	L	April 1, 1976	1–4	Houston Aeros (1975–76)	33–38–6
78	W	April 2, 1976	3–1	@ Toronto Toros (1975–76)	34–38–6
79	L	April 3, 1976	2–5	New England Whalers (1975–76)	34–39–6
80	W	April 4, 1976	4–2	@ New England Whalers (1975–76)	35–39–6

Legend: Win (2 points) Loss (0 points) Tie (1 point)

== Playoffs ==
1976 Avco Cup playoffs
Quarterfinals vs. New England Whalers – Whalers win 4–3

Game	Date	Visitor	Score	Home	Series
1	April 16	New England Whalers	4 – 1	Indianapolis Racers	0–1
2	April 17	New England Whalers	0 – 4	Indianapolis Racers	1–1
3	April 21	Indianapolis Racers	0 – 3	New England Whalers	1–2
4	April 23	Indianapolis Racers	1 – 2	New England Whalers	1–3
5	April 24	New England Whalers	0 – 4	Indianapolis Racers	2–3
6	April 27	Indianapolis Racers	5 – 3	New England Whalers	3–3
7	April 29	New England Whalers	6 – 0	Indianapolis Racers	3–4

Legend: Win Loss

== Player statistics ==
Regular season
Scoring

Player	Pos	GP	G	A	Pts	PIM	+/-	PPG	SHG	GWG
Pat Stapleton	D	80	5	40	45	48	-7	3	0	1
Al Karlander	C	79	16	28	44	36	15	4	0	3
Bob Sicinski	C	70	9	34	43	4	-2	3	0	2
Nick Harbaruk	RW	76	23	19	42	26	10	2	2	4
Reg Thomas	LW	80	23	17	40	23	1	4	0	2
Hugh Harris	C	41	12	28	40	23	1	3	0	1
Rene Leclerc	RW	40	18	21	39	52	1	7	0	3
Brian McDonald	C	62	16	17	33	54	-6	1	2	4
Bob Fitchner	C	52	15	16	31	112	0	5	0	2
Blair MacDonald	RW	56	19	11	30	14	2	1	0	1
Michel Parizeau	C	23	13	15	28	20	9	8	0	1
Brian Coates	LW	59	11	16	27	24	-5	2	1	2
Ken Block	D	79	1	25	26	28	4	0	0	1
Randy Wyrozub	C	55	11	14	25	8	-4	5	1	2
Bob Whitlock	C	30	7	15	22	16	1	2	0	1
Dick Proceviat	D	73	7	14	21	31	7	0	0	2
Ted Scharf	RW	74	7	14	21	56	-8	2	0	0
Daryl Maggs	D	36	5	16	21	40	5	1	0	0
Kim Clackson	D	77	1	12	13	351	-10	1	0	0
Ron Buchanan	C	23	4	7	11	4	-5	1	0	0
Bryon Baltimore	D	37	1	10	11	30	8	0	0	1
Dave Keon	C	12	3	7	10	2	2	1	0	0
Frank Rochon	LW	19	6	2	8	31	0	2	0	0
Bob Woytowich	D	42	1	7	8	14	0	0	0	0
Murray Heatley	RW	34	2	5	7	7	-7	0	0	0
Bill Prentice	D	38	4	2	6	92	-5	0	0	2
Michel Dubois	D	34	2	2	4	104	-11	1	0	0
John Sheridan	C	11	1	2	3	0	-5	0	0	1
Andy Brown	G	24	0	3	3	17	0	0	0	0
Kerry Bond	LW	15	2	0	2	9	-7	0	0	0
Jim Wiste	C	7	0	2	2	0	-2	0	0	0
Jim Park	G	11	0	1	1	2	0	0	0	0
Glenn Critch	D	3	0	0	0	0	0	0	0	0
Michel Dion	G	31	0	0	0	2	0	0	0	0
Leif Holmquist	G	19	0	0	0	4	0	0	0	0
Bob Jones	LW	2	0	0	0	0	-1	0	0	0
Mark Lomenda	RW	2	0	0	0	0	-1	0	0	0
Bob Roselle	LW	1	0	0	0	0	-1	0	0	0

Goaltending

Player	MIN	GP	W	L	T	GA	GAA	SO
Michel Dion	1860	31	14	15	1	85	2.74	0
Andy Brown	1368	24	9	11	2	82	3.60	1
Leif Holmquist	1079	19	6	9	3	54	3.00	0
Jim Park	572	11	6	4	0	23	2.41	0
Team:	4879	80	35	39	6	244	3.00	1

Playoffs
Scoring

Player	Pos	GP	G	A	Pts	PIM	PPG	SHG	GWG
Michel Parizeau	C	7	4	4	8	6	0	0	0
Hugh Harris	C	7	2	5	7	8	0	0	0
Rene Leclerc	RW	7	2	3	5	7	0	0	0
Dave Keon	C	7	2	2	4	2	0	0	0
Ken Block	D	7	0	4	4	2	0	0	0
Nick Harbaruk	RW	7	2	0	2	10	0	0	0
Pat Stapleton	D	7	0	2	2	2	0	0	0
Kerry Bond	LW	7	1	0	1	11	0	0	0
Daryl Maggs	D	7	1	0	1	20	0	0	0
Reg Thomas	LW	7	1	0	1	4	0	0	0
Bryon Baltimore	D	7	0	1	1	4	0	0	0
Brian McDonald	C	7	0	1	1	12	0	0	0
Jim Park	G	6	0	1	1	0	0	0	0
Kim Clackson	D	6	0	0	0	25	0	0	0
Brian Coates	LW	4	0	0	0	6	0	0	0
Michel Dion	G	3	0	0	0	0	0	0	0
Al Karlander	C	3	0	0	0	4	0	0	0
Blair MacDonald	RW	7	0	0	0	0	0	0	0
Dick Proceviat	D	7	0	0	0	2	0	0	0
Ted Scharf	RW	7	0	0	0	5	0	0	0
Bob Sicinski	C	7	0	0	0	2	0	0	0

Goaltending

Player	MIN	GP	W	L	GA	GAA	SO
Jim Park	293	6	3	2	12	2.46	2
Michel Dion	126	3	0	2	5	2.38	0
Team:	419	7	3	4	17	2.43	2

Note: Pos = Position; GP = Games played; G = Goals; A = Assists; Pts = Points; +/- = plus/minus; PIM = Penalty minutes; PPG = Power-play goals; SHG = Short-handed goals; GWG = Game-winning goals
MIN = Minutes played; W = Wins; L = Losses; T = Ties; GA = Goals-against; GAA = Goals-against average; SO = Shutouts;

== Draft picks ==
Indianapolis's draft picks at the 1975 WHA Amateur Draft.

Round	#	Player	Nationality	College/Junior/Club team (League)
1	2	Bryan Maxwell (D)	Canada	Medicine Hat Tigers (WCHL)
3	32	Clark Hamilton (C)	United States	University of Notre Dame (WCHA)
4	47	Blair MacKasey (D)	Canada	Montreal Red White and Blue (QMJHL)
5	62	Rick Bowness (C)	Canada	Montreal Red White and Blue (QMJHL)
6	76	Eric Sanderson (LW)	Canada	Victoria Cougars (WCHL)
7	90	Doug Young (D)	Canada	Michigan Tech University (WCHA)
8	103	Stan Jonathan (LW)	Canada	Peterborough Petes (OHA)
9	115	Larry Huras (D)	Canada	Kitchener Rangers (OHA)
10	127	Kari Makkonen (F)	Finland	Assat Pori (SM-sarja)
11	140	Michel Blais (D)	Canada	Kingston Canadians (OHA)
12	152	Anders Steen (F)	Sweden	Farjestads BK (Sweden)
13	162	Paul Evans (RW)	Canada	Peterborough Petes (OHA)

== See also ==
- 1975–76 WHA season
