= 1975–76 Minnesota Fighting Saints season =

World Hockey Association team season

1975–76 Minnesota Fighting Saints
- Division: 4th West
- 1975–76 record: 30–25–4
- Home record: 16–11–2
- Road record: 14–14–2
- Goals for: 211
- Goals against: 212

Team information
- Coach: Harry Neale
- Captain: Ted Hampson
- Arena: St. Paul Civic Center

Team leaders
- Goals: Mike Walton (31)
- Assists: Mike Walton (40)
- Points: Mike Walton (71)
- Penalty minutes: Curt Brackenbury (254)
- Wins: John Garrett (26)
- Goals against average: John Garrett (3.34)

The 1975–76 Minnesota Fighting Saints season was the original Minnesota Fighting Saints' fourth and final season of operation in the World Hockey Association (WHA). The Saints did not finish the season, folding after 59 games. However the 1975–76 Cleveland Crusaders would relocate to Minnesota the following season and play as the new Fighting Saints.

== Regular season ==
=== Final standings ===
Western Division	GP	W	L	T	Pts	GF	GA	PIM
Houston Aeros	80	53	27	0	106	341	263	1093
Phoenix Roadrunners	80	39	35	6	84	302	287	1292
San Diego Mariners	80	36	38	6	78	303	290	716
Minnesota Fighting Saints	59	30	25	4	64	211	212	1354

== Schedule and results ==
1975–76 regular season
October

Game	Result	Date	Score	Opponent	Record
1	W	October 10, 1975	4–1	@ Edmonton Oilers (1975–76)	1–0–0
2	W	October 12, 1975	2–0	@ Calgary Cowboys (1975–76)	2–0–0
3	L	October 15, 1975	4–8	Cleveland Crusaders (1975–76)	2–1–0
4	L	October 18, 1975	1–3	Edmonton Oilers (1975–76)	2–2–0
5	W	October 21, 1975	2–1	@ Indianapolis Racers (1975–76)	3–2–0
6	T	October 23, 1975	4–4	@ San Diego Mariners (1975–76)	3–2–1
7	L	October 25, 1975	1–6	@ San Diego Mariners (1975–76)	3–3–1
8	L	October 29, 1975	4–6	Cincinnati Stingers (1975–76)	3–4–1

November

Game	Result	Date	Score	Opponent	Record
9	W	November 1, 1975	3–2	Phoenix Roadrunners (1975–76)	4–4–1
10	L	November 5, 1975	4–6	@ Houston Aeros (1975–76)	4–5–1
11	W	November 8, 1975	4–3	Toronto Toros (1975–76)	5–5–1
12	L	November 11, 1975	6–8	@ Quebec Nordiques (1975–76)	5–6–1
13	W	November 15, 1975	9–7	Indianapolis Racers (1975–76)	6–6–1
14	W	November 16, 1975	3–2	@ Cincinnati Stingers (1975–76)	7–6–1
15	L	November 19, 1975	3–4 OT	@ Cleveland Crusaders (1975–76)	7–7–1
16	W	November 20, 1975	2–0	@ New England Whalers (1975–76)	8–7–1
17	L	November 22, 1975	4–6	Calgary Cowboys (1975–76)	8–8–1
18	W	November 25, 1975	3–2 OT	New England Whalers (1975–76)	9–8–1
19	W	November 27, 1975	5–3	Cincinnati Stingers (1975–76)	10–8–1
20	L	November 30, 1975	3–5	@ Winnipeg Jets (1975–76)	10–9–1

December

Game	Result	Date	Score	Opponent	Record
21	W	December 5, 1975	4–3	Denver Spurs/Ottawa Civics (1975–76)	11–9–1
22	W	December 9, 1975	5–3	@ Toronto Toros (1975–76)	12–9–1
23	L	December 10, 1975	2–3	@ New England Whalers (1975–76)	12–10–1
24	L	December 12, 1975	0–1	@ Cleveland Crusaders (1975–76)	12–11–1
25	W	December 13, 1975	4–3	Houston Aeros (1975–76)	13–11–1
26	T	December 17, 1975	0–0	New England Whalers (1975–76)	13–11–2
27	W	December 20, 1975	6–3	Winnipeg Jets (1975–76)	14–11–2
28	W	December 21, 1975	3–1	@ Winnipeg Jets (1975–76)	15–11–2
29	W	December 23, 1975	5–4	@ Denver Spurs/Ottawa Civics (1975–76)	16–11–2
30	L	December 27, 1975	0–5	@ Houston Aeros (1975–76)	16–12–2
31	L	December 28, 1975	1–2	San Diego Mariners (1975–76)	16–13–2
32	T	December 30, 1975	4–4	Quebec Nordiques (1975–76)	16–13–3

January

Game	Result	Date	Score	Opponent	Record
33	W	January 3, 1976	3–1	Indianapolis Racers (1975–76)	17–13–3
34	L	January 4, 1976	2–5	Denver Spurs/Ottawa Civics (1975–76)	17–14–3
35	W	January 7, 1976	7–6 OT	Phoenix Roadrunners (1975–76)	18–14–3
36	L	January 10, 1976	1–4	Houston Aeros (1975–76)	18–15–3
37	W	January 11, 1976	7–4	@ Cincinnati Stingers (1975–76)	19–15–3
38	L	January 15, 1976	4–5 OT	@ San Diego Mariners (1975–76)	19–16–3
39	L	January 16, 1976	1–3	@ Phoenix Roadrunners (1975–76)	19–17–3
40	W	January 17, 1976	4–2	@ Phoenix Roadrunners (1975–76)	20–17–3
41	W	January 21, 1976	6–5 OT	San Diego Mariners (1975–76)	21–17–3
42	L	January 23, 1976	1–7	San Diego Mariners (1975–76)	21–18–3
43	W	January 25, 1976	5–2	Toronto Toros (1975–76)	22–18–3
44	W	January 28, 1976	6–2	Winnipeg Jets (1975–76)	23–18–3
45	W	January 29, 1976	6–5 OT	@ Indianapolis Racers (1975–76)	24–18–3
46	W	January 31, 1976	4–1	Houston Aeros (1975–76)	25–18–3

February

Game	Result	Date	Score	Opponent	Record
47	L	February 1, 1976	5–6	Cleveland Crusaders (1975–76)	25–19–3
48	L	February 3, 1976	4–8	@ Houston Aeros (1975–76)	25–20–3
49	L	February 4, 1976	1–4	@ San Diego Mariners (1975–76)	25–21–3
50	L	February 7, 1976	2–4	@ Phoenix Roadrunners (1975–76)	25–22–3
51	T	February 8, 1976	3–3	@ Phoenix Roadrunners (1975–76)	25–22–4
52	W	February 10, 1976	6–3	San Diego Mariners (1975–76)	26–22–4
53	W	February 11, 1976	4–2	@ San Diego Mariners (1975–76)	27–22–4
54	W	February 12, 1976	6–4	Quebec Nordiques (1975–76)	28–22–4
55	L	February 14, 1976	2–5	Phoenix Roadrunners (1975–76)	28–23–4
56	W	February 17, 1976	6–3	@ Toronto Toros (1975–76)	29–23–4
57	W	February 20, 1976	6–3	@ Calgary Cowboys (1975–76)	30–23–4
58	L	February 22, 1976	3–4	@ Edmonton Oilers (1975–76)	30–24–4
59	L	February 25, 1976	1–2 OT	San Diego Mariners (1975–76)	30–25–4

Legend: Win (2 points) Loss (0 points) Tie (1 point)

== Player statistics ==
Regular season
Scoring

Player	Pos	GP	G	A	Pts	PIM	+/-	PPG	SHG	GWG
Mike Walton	C	58	31	40	71	27	7	0	0	0
Dave Keon	C	57	26	38	64	4	14	5	2	3
Fran Huck	C	59	17	32	49	27	9	0	0	0
Wayne Connelly	C	59	24	23	47	19	9	4	0	2
John McKenzie	RW	57	21	26	47	48	10	4	2	6
Mike Antonovich	C	57	25	21	46	18	21	0	0	0
Henry Boucha	C	36	15	20	35	47	3	0	0	0
Rick Smith	D	51	1	32	33	50	1	0	0	0
Paul Holmgren	RW	51	14	16	30	121	-7	0	0	0
Ted Hampson	C	59	5	14	19	14	-3	0	1	0
Jack Carlson	LW	58	8	10	18	189	-14	0	0	1
Gary Gambucci	C	45	10	6	16	14	5	0	0	0
Bill Butters	D	59	0	15	15	170	19	0	0	0
Curt Brackenbury	RW	59	4	9	13	254	7	0	0	0
Pat Westrum	D	54	3	10	13	98	0	0	0	0
Ron Busniuk	RW	59	2	11	13	150	9	2	0	0
Gerry Odrowski	D	37	1	12	13	10	-9	0	0	0
Bruce Boudreau	C	30	3	6	9	4	-1	0	0	0
Jerry Zrymiak	D	22	0	8	8	16	2	0	0	0
Perry Miller	D	13	1	4	5	11	-5	0	0	0
John Arbour	D	7	0	4	4	14	4	0	0	0
Francois Ouimet	D	9	0	2	2	2	0	0	0	0
Jeff Carlson	RW	7	0	1	1	14	0	0	0	0
Steve Carlson	C	10	0	1	1	23	-1	0	0	0
Mike Curran	G	5	0	0	0	2	0	0	0	0
John Garrett	G	52	0	0	0	6	0	0	0	0
Jean-Louis Levasseur	G	4	0	0	0	0	0	0	0	0
Craig Sarner	RW	1	0	0	0	0	0	0	0	0
Jean Tetreault	LW	3	0	0	0	0	0	0	0	0

Goaltending

Player	MIN	GP	W	L	T	GA	GAA	SO
John Garrett	3179	52	26	22	4	177	3.34	2
Mike Curran	240	5	2	2	0	22	5.50	1
Jean-Louis Levasseur	193	4	2	1	0	10	3.11	0
Team:	3612	59	30	25	4	209	3.47	3

Note: Pos = Position; GP = Games played; G = Goals; A = Assists; Pts = Points; +/- = plus/minus; PIM = Penalty minutes; PPG = Power-play goals; SHG = Short-handed goals; GWG = Game-winning goals
MIN = Minutes played; W = Wins; L = Losses; T = Ties; GA = Goals-against; GAA = Goals-against average; SO = Shutouts;

== Draft picks ==
Minnesota's draft picks at the 1975 WHA Amateur Draft.

Round	#	Player	Nationality	College/Junior/Club team (League)
1	10	Greg Hickey (LW)	Canada	Hamilton Fincups (OHA)
2	25	Kim Clackson (D)	Canada	Victoria Cougars (WCHL)
3	40	Greg Neeld (D)	Canada	Calgary Centennials (WCHL)
4	55	Bob Hoffmeyer (D)	Canada	Saskatoon Blades (WCHL)
5	69	Jim Minor (C)	Canada	Regina Pats (WCHL)
6	83	Brian Shmyr (C)	Canada	New Westminster Bruins (WCHL)
7	96	Marc Tessier (C)	Canada	Sherbrooke Castors (QMJHL)
8	108	Bob McNeice (LW)	Canada	New Westminster Bruins (WCHL)
9	120	Dave Faulkner (C)	Canada	Regina Pats (WCHL)
10	133	Denis Daigle (LW)	Canada	Montreal Red White and Blue (QMJHL)
11	146	Earl Sargent (W)	United States	Fargo-Moorhead Sugar Kings (MidJHL)
12	157	Richard Dutton (D)	Canada	Laval National (QMJHL)
13	167	Tom Ulseth (C)	United States	University of Wisconsin (WCHA)
14	173	Henry Taylor (RW)	United States	St. Paul Vulcans (MidJHL)

== See also ==
- 1975–76 WHA season
