= 1975–76 Phoenix Roadrunners season =

Professional hockey season

1975–76 Phoenix Roadrunners
- Division: 2nd Western
- 1975–76 record: 39–35–6
- Home record: 20–14–6
- Road record: 19–21–0
- Goals for: 302
- Goals against: 287

Team information
- Coach: Sandy Hucul
- Captain: Al McLeod
- Alternate captains: Jim Niekamp; Robbie Ftorek
- Arena: Arizona Veterans Memorial Coliseum

Team leaders
- Goals: Del Hall (47)
- Assists: Robbie Ftorek (72)
- Points: Robbie Ftorek (113)
- Penalty minutes: Cam Connor (295)
- Wins: Jack Norris (21)
- Goals against average: Jack Norris (3.18)

The 1975–76 Phoenix Roadrunners season was the second season of operation of the Phoenix Roadrunners in the World Hockey Association (WHA). The Roadrunners qualified for the playoffs but lost in the first round to the San Diego Mariners.

== Regular season ==
=== Final standings ===
Western Division	GP	W	L	T	Pts	GF	GA	PIM
Houston Aeros	80	53	27	0	106	341	263	1093
Phoenix Roadrunners	80	39	35	6	84	302	287	1292
San Diego Mariners	80	36	38	6	78	303	290	716
Minnesota Fighting Saints	59	30	25	4	64	211	212	1354

== Schedule and results ==
1975–76 regular season
October

Game	Result	Date	Score	Opponent	Record
1	W	October 10, 1975	6–5	San Diego Mariners (1975–76)	1–0–0
2	W	October 11, 1975	4–2	@ San Diego Mariners (1975–76)	2–0–0
3	L	October 12, 1975	0–4	Winnipeg Jets (1975–76)	2–1–0
4	L	October 17, 1975	4–5	Denver Spurs/Ottawa Civics (1975–76)	2–2–0
5	W	October 19, 1975	6–5	Winnipeg Jets (1975–76)	3–2–0
6	W	October 24, 1975	4–3	@ Calgary Cowboys (1975–76)	4–2–0
7	L	October 26, 1975	0–5	@ Winnipeg Jets (1975–76)	4–3–0
8	L	October 28, 1975	3–7	@ Edmonton Oilers (1975–76)	4–4–0
9	W	October 30, 1975	3–2	@ Denver Spurs/Ottawa Civics (1975–76)	5–4–0

November

Game	Result	Date	Score	Opponent	Record
10	L	November 1, 1975	2–3	@ Minnesota Fighting Saints (1975–76)	5–5–0
11	L	November 2, 1975	2–5	@ Cleveland Crusaders (1975–76)	5–6–0
12	L	November 7, 1975	3–5	@ Houston Aeros (1975–76)	5–7–0
13	W	November 8, 1975	3–2	@ New England Whalers (1975–76)	6–7–0
14	L	November 9, 1975	3–7	@ Quebec Nordiques (1975–76)	6–8–0
15	T	November 14, 1975	2–2	Toronto Toros (1975–76)	6–8–1
16	T	November 16, 1975	4–4	Cleveland Crusaders (1975–76)	6–8–2
17	W	November 20, 1975	3–1	Edmonton Oilers (1975–76)	7–8–2
18	L	November 22, 1975	5–7	@ New England Whalers (1975–76)	7–9–2
19	L	November 27, 1975	1–5	Calgary Cowboys (1975–76)	7–10–2
20	T	November 29, 1975	4–4	Quebec Nordiques (1975–76)	7–10–3
21	L	November 30, 1975	1–2	Quebec Nordiques (1975–76)	7–11–3

December

Game	Result	Date	Score	Opponent	Record
22	W	December 4, 1975	5–4	New England Whalers (1975–76)	8–11–3
23	W	December 6, 1975	6–5 OT	Houston Aeros (1975–76)	9–11–3
24	L	December 10, 1975	1–2	Indianapolis Racers (1975–76)	9–12–3
25	L	December 12, 1975	2–4	Cincinnati Stingers (1975–76)	9–13–3
26	W	December 13, 1975	4–1	@ Denver Spurs/Ottawa Civics (1975–76)	10–13–3
27	W	December 14, 1975	4–2	San Diego Mariners (1975–76)	11–13–3
28	W	December 18, 1975	7–1	Indianapolis Racers (1975–76)	12–13–3
29	L	December 20, 1975	3–4	Houston Aeros (1975–76)	12–14–3
30	W	December 23, 1975	5–3	@ Cincinnati Stingers (1975–76)	13–14–3
31	L	December 26, 1975	2–4	@ San Diego Mariners (1975–76)	13–15–3
32	W	December 27, 1975	10–0	Denver Spurs/Ottawa Civics (1975–76)	14–15–3
33	W	December 28, 1975	5–2	@ Denver Spurs/Ottawa Civics (1975–76)	15–15–3

January

Game	Result	Date	Score	Opponent	Record
34	L	January 2, 1976	1–4	@ Toronto Toros (1975–76)	15–16–3
35	W	January 3, 1976	4–1	@ Quebec Nordiques (1975–76)	16–16–3
36	L	January 4, 1976	2–3	@ Cleveland Crusaders (1975–76)	16–17–3
37	L	January 7, 1976	6–7 OT	@ Minnesota Fighting Saints (1975–76)	16–18–3
38	W	January 8, 1976	7–1	Cincinnati Stingers (1975–76)	17–18–3
39	W	January 10, 1976	8–5	Denver Spurs/Ottawa Civics (1975–76)	18–18–3
40	W	January 16, 1976	3–1	Minnesota Fighting Saints (1975–76)	19–18–3
41	L	January 17, 1976	2–4	Minnesota Fighting Saints (1975–76)	19–19–3
42	T	January 20, 1976	4–4	New England Whalers (1975–76)	19–19–4
43	W	January 22, 1976	6–4	Toronto Toros (1975–76)	20–19–4
44	W	January 25, 1976	7–5	San Diego Mariners (1975–76)	21–19–4
45	W	January 27, 1976	4–3 OT	@ San Diego Mariners (1975–76)	22–19–4
46	W	January 28, 1976	5–0	Calgary Cowboys (1975–76)	23–19–4
47	T	January 30, 1976	4–4	Cleveland Crusaders (1975–76)	23–19–5
48	L	January 31, 1976	1–6	@ San Diego Mariners (1975–76)	23–20–5

February

Game	Result	Date	Score	Opponent	Record
49	W	February 4, 1976	5–1	Cleveland Crusaders (1975–76)	24–20–5
50	W	February 5, 1976	5–1	Edmonton Oilers (1975–76)	25–20–5
51	W	February 7, 1976	4–2	Minnesota Fighting Saints (1975–76)	26–20–5
52	T	February 8, 1976	3–3	Minnesota Fighting Saints (1975–76)	26–20–6
53	L	February 11, 1976	1–2	@ Indianapolis Racers (1975–76)	26–21–6
54	L	February 12, 1976	1–4	Houston Aeros (1975–76)	26–22–6
55	W	February 14, 1976	5–2	@ Minnesota Fighting Saints (1975–76)	27–22–6
56	W	February 15, 1976	4–2	@ Edmonton Oilers (1975–76)	28–22–6
57	L	February 18, 1976	3–4	@ Winnipeg Jets (1975–76)	28–23–6
58	L	February 20, 1976	1–4	@ Cincinnati Stingers (1975–76)	28–24–6
59	W	February 22, 1976	6–5	@ Indianapolis Racers (1975–76)	29–24–6
60	W	February 27, 1976	4–3	San Diego Mariners (1975–76)	30–24–6
61	W	February 29, 1976	5–2	@ Calgary Cowboys (1975–76)	31–24–6

March

Game	Result	Date	Score	Opponent	Record
62	W	March 2, 1976	5–2	Indianapolis Racers (1975–76)	32–24–6
63	L	March 5, 1976	3–6	@ Houston Aeros (1975–76)	32–25–6
64	L	March 6, 1976	3–5	New England Whalers (1975–76)	32–26–6
65	L	March 7, 1976	2–5	@ San Diego Mariners (1975–76)	32–27–6
66	W	March 10, 1976	3–2	@ New England Whalers (1975–76)	33–27–6
67	W	March 12, 1976	5–2	@ Toronto Toros (1975–76)	34–27–6
68	L	March 13, 1976	4–6	@ Indianapolis Racers (1975–76)	34–28–6
69	W	March 14, 1976	3–2 OT	@ Cleveland Crusaders (1975–76)	35–28–6
70	L	March 17, 1976	4–7	Houston Aeros (1975–76)	35–29–6
71	L	March 19, 1976	5–6 OT	Cleveland Crusaders (1975–76)	35–30–6
72	W	March 20, 1976	4–3 OT	@ San Diego Mariners (1975–76)	36–30–6
73	L	March 21, 1976	3–4	@ Houston Aeros (1975–76)	36–31–6
74	L	March 24, 1976	4–5	Cincinnati Stingers (1975–76)	36–32–6
75	W	March 26, 1976	3–1	San Diego Mariners (1975–76)	37–32–6
76	W	March 27, 1976	5–2	@ San Diego Mariners (1975–76)	38–32–6
77	L	March 28, 1976	4–7	@ Houston Aeros (1975–76)	38–33–6
78	W	March 31, 1976	7–2	@ Cincinnati Stingers (1975–76)	39–33–6

April

Game	Result	Date	Score	Opponent	Record
79	L	April 3, 1976	2–8	Houston Aeros (1975–76)	39–34–6
80	L	April 6, 1976	5–8	@ Houston Aeros (1975–76)	39–35–6

Legend: Win (2 points) Loss (0 points) Tie (1 point)

== Playoffs ==
1976 Avco Cup playoffs
Preliminary round vs. San Diego Mariners – Mariners win 3–2

Game	Date	Visitor	Score	Home	Series
1	April 9	San Diego Mariners	2–3 OT	Phoenix Roadrunners	0–1
2	April 10	Phoenix Roadrunners	2–4	San Diego Mariners	1-1
3	April 13	San Diego Mariners	4–6	Phoenix Roadrunners	1–2
4	April 15	Phoenix Roadrunners	1–5	San Diego Mariners	2-2
5	April 17	San Diego Mariners	2–1	Phoenix Roadrunners	3–2

Legend: Win Loss

== Player statistics ==
=== Players ===
Regular season
Player	Position	GP	G	A	Pts	PIM	+/-	PPG	SHG	GWG
Robbie Ftorek	C/LW	80	41	72	113	109	36	10	0	4
Del Hall	C	80	47	44	91	10	21	12	0	7
John Gray	RW	79	35	45	80	136	22	6	0	5
Ron Huston	C	79	22	44	66	4	0	4	4	2
Jim Boyd	C	80	23	34	57	44	3	7	2	4
Pekka Rautakallio	D	73	11	39	50	8	25	3	0	2
Gary Veneruzzo	W	61	19	24	43	27	22	3	1	3
Cam Connor	RW	73	18	21	39	295	23	1	0	0
Michel Cormier	LW	46	21	15	36	4	5	4	0	1
Lauri Mononen	RW	75	15	21	36	19	9	2	0	2
Barry Dean	LW	71	9	25	34	110	17	1	0	4
Dave Gorman	RW	67	11	20	31	28	0	1	0	1
Garry Lariviere	D	79	7	17	24	100	15	1	0	0
Serge Beaudoin	D	76	0	21	21	102	4	0	0	0
John Migneault	LW	68	8	12	20	14	-9	0	0	2
Al McLeod	D	80	2	18	20	82	12	1	0	0
Jim Niekamp	D	79	4	14	18	77	21	1	0	1
Grant Erickson	LW	33	4	7	11	6	0	0	1	0
Jim Clarke	D	59	1	9	10	57	3	0	0	0
Gary Kurt	G	40	0	4	4	2	0	0	0	0
Peter McNamee	D	14	1	2	3	32	-6	0	0	0
Mike Sleep	RW	9	2	0	2	0	-4	0	0	1
Mike Hobin	C	9	1	1	2	2	1	0	0	0
Murray Keogan	C	8	0	2	2	4	0	0	0	0
Jack Norris	G	41	0	2	2	6	0	0	0	0
Clay Hebenton	G	2	0	0	0	0	0	0	0	0

Avco Cup playoffs
Player	Position	GP	G	A	Pts	PIM	PPG	SHG	GWG
Jim Boyd	C	5	3	2	5	2	0	0	0
Del Hall	C	5	2	3	5	0	0	0	0
Robbie Ftorek	C/LW	5	1	3	4	2	0	0	0
Lauri Mononen	RW	5	1	3	4	2	0	0	0
Gary Veneruzzo	W	5	2	0	2	7	0	0	0
John Gray	RW	5	1	1	2	7	0	0	0
Ron Huston	C	5	1	1	2	0	0	0	0
Grant Erickson	LW	5	0	2	2	0	0	0	0
Dave Gorman	RW	5	0	2	2	24	0	0	0
Garry Lariviere	D	5	0	2	2	2	0	0	0
Al McLeod	D	5	0	2	2	4	0	0	0
Pekka Rautakallio	D	5	0	2	2	0	0	0	0
Serge Beaudoin	D	5	1	0	1	10	0	0	0
Cam Connor	RW	5	1	0	1	21	0	0	0
Jim Niekamp	D	5	0	1	1	0	0	0	0
John Migneault	LW	3	0	0	0	0	0	0	0
Jack Norris	G	5	0	0	0	0	0	0	0
Mike Sleep	RW	3	0	0	0	0	0	0	0

=== Goaltending ===
Regular season
Player	MIN	GP	W	L	T	GA	GAA	SO
Jack Norris	2412	41	21	14	4	128	3.18	1
Gary Kurt	2369	40	18	20	2	147	3.72	1
Clay Hebenton	80	2	0	1	0	9	6.75	0
Team:	4861	80	39	35	6	284	3.51	2

Avco Cup playoffs
Player	MIN	GP	W	L	GA	GAA	SO
Jack Norris	298	5	2	3	17	3.42	0
Team:	298	5	2	3	17	3.42	0

Note: Pos = Position; GP = Games played; G = Goals; A = Assists; Pts = Points; +/- = plus/minus; PIM = Penalty minutes; PPG = Power-play goals; SHG = Short-handed goals; GWG = Game-winning goals
MIN = Minutes played; W = Wins; L = Losses; T = Ties; GA = Goals-against; GAA = Goals-against average; SO = Shutouts;

== Draft picks ==
Phoenix's draft picks at the 1975 WHA Amateur Draft.

Round	#	Player	Nationality	College/Junior/Club team (League)
1	9	Greg Vaydik (F)	Canada	Medicine Hat Tigers (WCHL)
2	23	Neil Lyseng (RW)	Canada	Kamloops Chiefs (WCHL)
2	24	Mike O'Connell (D)	United States	Kingston Canadians (OHA)
3	39	Blair Davidson (D)	Canada	Flin Flon Bombers (WCHL)
4	54	Roger Swanson (G)	Canada	Flin Flon Bombers (WCHL)
5	68	Mike Sleep (RW)	Canada	New Westminster Bruins (WCHL)
6	82	Dana Decker (LW)	United States	Michigan Tech University (WCHA)
7	95	Dale McMullin (LW)	Canada	Brandon Wheat Kings (WCHL)
8	107	Gary Morrison (F)	United States	University of Michigan (WCHA)

== See also ==
- 1975–76 WHA season
