= 1975–76 Houston Aeros season =

1975–76 Houston Aeros
- Division: 1st West
- 1975–76 record: 53–27–0
- Home record: 33–7–0
- Road record: 20–20–0
- Goals for: 341
- Goals against: 263

Team information
- Coach: Bill Dineen
- Captain: Ted Taylor
- Alternate captains: Gordie Howe; Gord Labossiere; Poul Popiel
- Arena: The Summit

Team leaders
- Goals: Mark Howe (39)
- Assists: Gordie Howe (70)
- Points: Gordie Howe (102)
- Penalty minutes: Glen Irwin (116)
- Wins: Ron Grahame (39)
- Goals against average: Wayne Rutledge (3.17)

The 1975–76 Houston Aeros season was the Houston Aeros' fourth season of operation in the World Hockey Association (WHA). The Aeros again qualified first for the playoffs and made it to the Avco Cup Final but lost the championship to the Winnipeg Jets. This was the first season that the Aeros played in the Summit after three seasons at Sam Houston Coliseum.

== Regular season ==
Gordie Howe scored 102 points, while his son Mark led the team with 39 goals.

=== Final standings ===
Western Division	GP	W	L	T	Pts	GF	GA	PIM
Houston Aeros	80	53	27	0	106	341	263	1093
Phoenix Roadrunners	80	39	35	6	84	302	287	1292
San Diego Mariners	80	36	38	6	78	303	290	716
Minnesota Fighting Saints	59	30	25	4	64	211	212	1354

== Schedule and results ==
1975–76 regular season
October: 3–4–0, 6 points (home: 0–0–0; road: 3–4–0)

Game	Result	Date	Score	Opponent	Record
1	W	October 11, 1975	5–0	@ New England Whalers (1975–76)	1–0–0
2	L	October 14, 1975	3–6	@ Toronto Toros (1975–76)	1–1–0
3	L	October 18, 1975	2–3	@ Quebec Nordiques (1975–76)	1–2–0
4	W	October 19, 1975	6–5	@ Cleveland Crusaders (1975–76)	2–2–0
5	L	October 23, 1975	0–4	@ Indianapolis Racers (1975–76)	2–3–0
6	L	October 25, 1975	4–7	@ Cincinnati Stingers (1975–76)	2–4–0
7	W	October 30, 1975	4–2	@ San Diego Mariners (1975–76)	3–4–0

November: 11–3–0, 22 points (home: 9–0–0; road: 2–3–0)

Game	Result	Date	Score	Opponent	Record
8	W	November 1, 1975	3–2	@ Denver Spurs/Ottawa Civics (1975–76)	4–4–0
9	W	November 5, 1975	6–4	Minnesota Fighting Saints (1975–76)	5–4–0
10	W	November 7, 1975	5–3	Phoenix Roadrunners (1975–76)	6–4–0
11	W	November 9, 1975	3–2	Denver Spurs/Ottawa Civics (1975–76)	7–4–0
12	W	November 11, 1975	5–4	Toronto Toros (1975–76)	8–4–0
13	L	November 12, 1975	1–4	@ New England Whalers (1975–76)	8–5–0
14	L	November 15, 1975	5–8	@ Cincinnati Stingers (1975–76)	8–6–0
15	L	November 16, 1975	3–5	@ Calgary Cowboys (1975–76)	8–7–0
16	W	November 18, 1975	3–2	@ Winnipeg Jets (1975–76)	9–7–0
17	W	November 21, 1975	4–2	Edmonton Oilers (1975–76)	10–7–0
18	W	November 23, 1975	4–0	Quebec Nordiques (1975–76)	11–7–0
19	W	November 25, 1975	4–1	Indianapolis Racers (1975–76)	12–7–0
20	W	November 28, 1975	7–4	Edmonton Oilers (1975–76)	13–7–0
21	W	November 30, 1975	8–4	San Diego Mariners (1975–76)	14–7–0

December: 7–6–0, 14 points (home: 5–3–0; road: 2–3–0)

Game	Result	Date	Score	Opponent	Record
22	L	December 2, 1975	2–5	New England Whalers (1975–76)	14–8–0
23	W	December 5, 1975	5–4	Winnipeg Jets (1975–76)	15–8–0
24	L	December 6, 1975	5–6 OT	@ Phoenix Roadrunners (1975–76)	15–9–0
25	W	December 9, 1975	6–4	Cincinnati Stingers (1975–76)	16–9–0
26	W	December 12, 1975	4–2	Indianapolis Racers (1975–76)	17–9–0
27	L	December 13, 1975	3–4	@ Minnesota Fighting Saints (1975–76)	17–10–0
28	W	December 14, 1975	4–3	@ Cleveland Crusaders (1975–76)	18–10–0
29	L	December 16, 1975	2–4	San Diego Mariners (1975–76)	18–11–0
30	W	December 20, 1975	4–3	@ Phoenix Roadrunners (1975–76)	19–11–0
31	L	December 21, 1975	1–3	@ San Diego Mariners (1975–76)	19–12–0
32	W	December 26, 1975	9–4	Denver Spurs/Ottawa Civics (1975–76)	20–12–0
33	W	December 27, 1975	5–0	Minnesota Fighting Saints (1975–76)	21–12–0
34	L	December 30, 1975	3–5	Winnipeg Jets (1975–76)	21–13–0

January: 10–5–0, 20 points (home: 6–1–0; road: 4–4–0)

Game	Result	Date	Score	Opponent	Record
35	W	January 3, 1976	4–2	Denver Spurs/Ottawa Civics (1975–76)	22–13–0
36	W	January 6, 1976	7–3	Cincinnati Stingers (1975–76)	23–13–0
37	W	January 9, 1976	6–5	Cleveland Crusaders (1975–76)	24–13–0
38	W	January 10, 1976	4–1	@ Minnesota Fighting Saints (1975–76)	25–13–0
39	W	January 11, 1976	5–3	@ Edmonton Oilers (1975–76)	26–13–0
40	L	January 14, 1976	1–4	@ Winnipeg Jets (1975–76)	26–14–0
41	W	January 15, 1976	5–4 OT	@ Denver Spurs/Ottawa Civics (1975–76)	27–14–0
42	L	January 17, 1976	2–4	@ Calgary Cowboys (1975–76)	27–15–0
43	L	January 20, 1976	5–7	Toronto Toros (1975–76)	27–16–0
44	W	January 21, 1976	9–3	New England Whalers (1975–76)	28–16–0
45	W	January 23, 1976	2–0	Calgary Cowboys (1975–76)	29–16–0
46	W	January 25, 1976	5–3	Calgary Cowboys (1975–76)	30–16–0
47	W	January 28, 1976	6–5	@ Edmonton Oilers (1975–76)	31–16–0
48	L	January 30, 1976	1–2	@ Indianapolis Racers (1975–76)	31–17–0
49	L	January 31, 1976	1–4	@ Minnesota Fighting Saints (1975–76)	31–18–0

February: 9–4–0, 18 points (home: 5–1–0; road: 4–3–0)

Game	Result	Date	Score	Opponent	Record
50	W	February 3, 1976	8–4	Minnesota Fighting Saints (1975–76)	32–18–0
51	W	February 6, 1976	4–3	Indianapolis Racers (1975–76)	33–18–0
52	W	February 8, 1976	5–2	San Diego Mariners (1975–76)	34–18–0
53	W	February 12, 1976	4–1	@ Phoenix Roadrunners (1975–76)	35–18–0
54	L	February 14, 1976	1–5	@ San Diego Mariners (1975–76)	35–19–0
55	L	February 15, 1976	2–4	Quebec Nordiques (1975–76)	35–20–0
56	W	February 17, 1976	4–3	New England Whalers (1975–76)	36–20–0
57	W	February 19, 1976	5–3	Cleveland Crusaders (1975–76)	37–20–0
58	L	February 22, 1976	1–2	@ Cleveland Crusaders (1975–76)	37–21–0
59	L	February 24, 1976	1–4	@ Quebec Nordiques (1975–76)	37–22–0
60	W	February 26, 1976	5–2	@ New England Whalers (1975–76)	38–22–0
61	W	February 27, 1976	7–6 OT	@ Toronto Toros (1975–76)	39–22–0
62	W	February 28, 1976	4–2	@ Cincinnati Stingers (1975–76)	40–22–0

March: 9–5–0, 18 points (home: 6–2–0; road: 3–3–0)

Game	Result	Date	Score	Opponent	Record
63	W	March 5, 1976	6–3	Phoenix Roadrunners (1975–76)	41–22–0
64	L	March 6, 1976	4–5	Cleveland Crusaders (1975–76)	41–23–0
65	W	March 9, 1976	9–2	San Diego Mariners (1975–76)	42–23–0
66	L	March 11, 1976	1–4	@ San Diego Mariners (1975–76)	42–24–0
67	W	March 13, 1976	3–2	@ San Diego Mariners (1975–76)	43–24–0
68	W	March 17, 1976	7–4	@ Phoenix Roadrunners (1975–76)	44–24–0
69	W	March 19, 1976	8–3	San Diego Mariners (1975–76)	45–24–0
70	L	March 20, 1976	1–2	@ Cincinnati Stingers (1975–76)	45–25–0
71	W	March 21, 1976	4–3	Phoenix Roadrunners (1975–76)	46–25–0
72	W	March 24, 1976	3–2	@ Cleveland Crusaders (1975–76)	47–25–0
73	L	March 25, 1976	3–4 OT	@ Indianapolis Racers (1975–76)	47–26–0
74	W	March 26, 1976	5–1	Cincinnati Stingers (1975–76)	48–26–0
75	W	March 28, 1976	7–4	Phoenix Roadrunners (1975–76)	49–26–0
76	L	March 30, 1976	3–4	San Diego Mariners (1975–76)	49–27–0

April: 4–0–0, 8 points (home: 2–0–0; road: 2–0–0)

Game	Result	Date	Score	Opponent	Record
77	W	April 1, 1976	4–1	@ Indianapolis Racers (1975–76)	50–27–0
78	W	April 3, 1976	8–2	@ Phoenix Roadrunners (1975–76)	51–27–0
79	W	April 4, 1976	5–2	San Diego Mariners (1975–76)	52–27–0
80	W	April 6, 1976	8–5	Phoenix Roadrunners (1975–76)	53–27–0

Legend: Win (2 points) Loss (0 points) Tie (1 point)

== Playoffs ==
The Aeros defeated the San Diego Mariners in the quarter-final round 4–2. The Aeros next defeated the New England Whalers 4–3 in the semi-final round to advance to the Final. While the Aeros won the series, they had nothing left for the Final and the Winnipeg Jets defeated the Aeros 4–0 to win the Avco Cup.

1976 Avco Cup playoffs
Quarterfinals vs. San Diego Mariners – Aeros win 4–2

Game	Date	Visitor	Score	Home	Series
1	April 21	San Diego Mariners	6–8	Houston Aeros	1–0
2	April 23	San Diego Mariners	1–3	Houston Aeros	2–0
3	April 25	Houston Aeros	8–4	San Diego Mariners	3–0
4	April 27	Houston Aeros	2–3	San Diego Mariners	3–1
5	April 28	San Diego Mariners	3–2	Houston Aeros	3–2
6	April 30	Houston Aeros	3–2	San Diego Mariners	4–2

Semifinals vs. New England Whalers – Aeros win 4–3

Game	Date	Visitor	Score	Home	Series
1	May 5	New England Whalers	4–2	Houston Aeros	0–1
2	May 7	New England Whalers	2–5	Houston Aeros	1–1
3	May 9	Houston Aeros	1–4	New England Whalers	1–2
4	May 11	Houston Aeros	4–3	New England Whalers	2–2
5	May 13	New England Whalers	2–4	Houston Aeros	3–2
6	May 15	Houston Aeros	1–6	New England Whalers	3–3
5	May 16	New England Whalers	0–2	Houston Aeros	4–3

Avco Cup Finals vs. Winnipeg Jets – Jets win 4–0

Game	Date	Visitor	Score	Home	Series
1	May 20	Winnipeg Jets	4–3	Houston Aeros	0–1
2	May 23	Winnipeg Jets	5–4	Houston Aeros	0–2
3	May 25	Houston Aeros	3–6	Winnipeg Jets	0–3
4	May 27	Houston Aeros	1–9	Winnipeg Jets	0–4

Legend: Win Loss

== Player statistics ==
Scoring

Regular season
Player	Pos	GP	G	A	Pts	PIM	+/-	PPG	SHG	GWG
Gordie Howe	RW	78	32	70	102	76	14	12	1	4
Mark Howe	LW	72	39	37	76	38	29	13	6	8
Frank Hughes	LW	80	31	45	76	26	12	12	0	6
Andre Hinse	LW	70	35	38	73	6	12	12	0	6
Larry Lund	C	73	24	49	73	50	3	6	1	1
Gord Labossiere	C	80	23	32	55	18	-1	4	0	3
Rich Preston	RW	77	22	33	55	33	30	1	2	4
Don Larway	RW	79	30	20	50	56	9	3	0	3
Terry Ruskowski	C	65	14	35	49	100	18	3	0	2
Murray Hall	RW	80	20	26	46	18	-3	3	0	8
Poul Popiel	D	78	10	36	46	71	29	2	2	2
Ted Taylor	LW	68	15	26	41	88	-10	3	0	0
John Schella	D	74	6	32	38	106	8	0	0	0
Marty Howe	D	80	14	23	37	81	40	0	0	2
John Tonelli	LW	79	17	14	31	66	11	3	1	2
Larry Hale	D	77	2	12	14	30	7	0	0	1
Jan Popiel	LW	67	4	7	11	59	-13	0	0	0
Glen Irwin	D	72	3	8	11	116	3	0	0	0
Bill Butters	D	14	0	4	4	18	8	0	0	0
Ron Grahame	G	57	0	1	1	22	0	0	0	0
Bob Liddington	LW	2	0	0	0	2	0	0	0	0
Wayne Rutledge	G	25	0	0	0	6	0	0	0	0
Mike Stevens	D	6	0	0	0	2	-2	0	0	0

Goaltending
Player	MIN	GP	W	L	T	GA	GAA	SO
Ron Grahame	3343	57	39	17	0	182	3.27	3
Wayne Rutledge	1456	25	14	10	0	77	3.17	1
Team:	4799	80	53	27	0	259	3.24	4

Player	Pos	GP	G	A	Pts	PIM	PPG	SHG	GWG
Mark Howe	D	17	6	10	16	18	0	0	0
Terry Ruskowski	C	16	6	10	16	64	0	0	0
John Tonelli	LW	17	7	7	14	8	0	0	0
Don Larway	RW	16	7	5	12	21	0	0	0
Gordie Howe	RW	17	4	8	12	31	0	0	0
Rich Preston	RW	17	4	6	10	8	0	0	0
Gord Labossiere	C	17	2	8	10	14	0	0	0
Marty Howe	D	16	4	4	8	12	0	0	0
Poul Popiel	D	17	3	5	8	16	0	0	0
John Schella	D	17	1	6	7	38	0	0	0
Frank Hughes	LW	17	5	1	6	20	0	0	0
Andre Hinse	LW	17	2	3	5	2	0	0	0
Murray Hall	RW	17	1	4	5	0	0	0	0
Larry Hale	D	17	0	5	5	8	0	0	0
Ted Taylor	LW	11	2	2	4	17	0	0	0
Bill Butters	D	17	0	3	3	51	0	0	0
Larry Lund	C	5	1	1	2	4	0	0	0
Jan Popiel	LW	8	1	1	2	4	0	0	0
Steve West	C	7	0	1	1	0	0	0	0
Ron Grahame	G	14	0	0	0	0	0	0	0
Glen Irwin	D	5	0	0	0	9	0	0	0
Wayne Rutledge	G	4	0	0	0	0	0	0	0

Player	MIN	GP	W	L	GA	GAA	SO
Ron Grahame	817	14	6	8	54	3.97	1
Wayne Rutledge	200	4	2	1	10	3.00	0
Team:	1017	17	8	9	64	3.78	1

Note: Pos = Position; GP = Games played; G = Goals; A = Assists; Pts = Points; +/- = plus/minus; PIM = Penalty minutes; PPG = Power-play goals; SHG = Short-handed goals; GWG = Game-winning goals
MIN = Minutes played; W = Wins; L = Losses; T = Ties; GA = Goals-against; GAA = Goals-against average; SO = Shutouts;

== Awards and records ==
- Ron Grahame, WHA All-Star Team (Second Team)

=== WHA All-Star Game (January 13, 1976) ===
- John Schella
- Marty Howe
- Gordie Howe
- Mark Howe

== Draft picks ==
Houston's draft picks at the 1975 WHA Amateur Draft.

Round	#	Player	Nationality	College/Junior/Club team (League)
1	15	Richard Mulhern (D)	Canada	Sherbrooke Castors (QMJHL)
2	30	Doug Jarvis (C)	Canada	Peterborough Petes (OHA)
3	45	Kevin Campbell (D)	Canada	St. Lawrence University (ECAC)
4	60	Dave Salvian (LW)	Canada	St. Catharines Black Hawks (OHA)
5	74	Paul Crowley (RW)	Canada	Sudbury Wolves (OHA)
6	88	Bill Cheropita (G)	Canada	St. Catharines Black Hawks (OHA)
7	101	John Glynne (D)	United States	University of Vermont (ECAC)
8	113	Dave Taylor (F)	Canada	Clarkson University (ECAC)
9	125	Jim Maxfield (D)	Canada	Sudbury Wolves (OHA)
10	138	Chad Campbell (LW)	Canada	University of Denver (WCHA)
11	150	Bill Oleschuk (G)	Canada	Saskatoon Blades (WCHL)
12	160	Jim Lundquist (D)	United States	Brown University (ECAC)
13	169	Rick St. Croix (G)	Canada	Oshawa Generals (OHA)
14	175	Paul Jensen (D)	United States	Michigan Tech University (WCHA)

== See also ==
- 1975–76 WHA season
