= 1975–76 San Diego Mariners season =

World Hockey Association team season

1975–76 San Diego Mariners
- Division: 3rd West
- 1975–76 record: 36–38–6
- Home record: 24–12–4
- Road record: 12–26–2
- Goals for: 303
- Goals against: 290

Team information
- Coach: Ron Ingram
- Captain: Norm Ferguson
- Alternate captains: Ken Block; Andre Lacroix
- Arena: San Diego Sports Arena

Team leaders
- Goals: Norm Ferguson; Gene Peacosh (37)
- Assists: Andre Lacroix (72)
- Points: Andre Lacroix (101)
- Penalty minutes: Kevin Devine (102)
- Wins: Ernie Wakely (35)
- Goals against average: Ernie Wakely (3.26)

The 1975–76 San Diego Mariners season was the second season of operation of the San Diego Mariners in the World Hockey Association (WHA). The Mariners placed third in the Western Division to qualify for the playoffs, losing in the second round to the Houston Aeros.

== Regular season ==
=== Final standings ===
Western Division	GP	W	L	T	Pts	GF	GA	PIM
Houston Aeros	80	53	27	0	106	341	263	1093
Phoenix Roadrunners	80	39	35	6	84	302	287	1292
San Diego Mariners	80	36	38	6	78	303	290	716
Minnesota Fighting Saints	59	30	25	4	64	211	212	1354

== Schedule and results ==
1975–76 regular season
October

Game	Result	Date	Score	Opponent	Record
1	L	October 10, 1975	5–6	@ Phoenix Roadrunners (1975–76)	0–1–0
2	L	October 11, 1975	2–4	Phoenix Roadrunners (1975–76)	0–2–0
3	W	October 16, 1975	3–0	Indianapolis Racers (1975–76)	1–2–0
4	W	October 18, 1975	2–1	Winnipeg Jets (1975–76)	2–2–0
5	T	October 23, 1975	4–4	Minnesota Fighting Saints (1975–76)	2–2–1
6	W	October 25, 1975	6–1	Minnesota Fighting Saints (1975–76)	3–2–1
7	L	October 30, 1975	2–4	Houston Aeros (1975–76)	3–3–1

November

Game	Result	Date	Score	Opponent	Record
8	L	November 2, 1975	3–5	@ Edmonton Oilers (1975–76)	3–4–1
9	T	November 4, 1975	4–4	@ Calgary Cowboys (1975–76)	3–4–2
10	W	November 7, 1975	3–2 OT	@ Denver Spurs/Ottawa Civics (1975–76)	4–4–2
11	L	November 8, 1975	4–7	@ Cincinnati Stingers (1975–76)	4–5–2
12	W	November 13, 1975	3–1	Cleveland Crusaders (1975–76)	5–5–2
13	L	November 15, 1975	4–6	Toronto Toros (1975–76)	5–6–2
14	L	November 17, 1975	3–6	@ Edmonton Oilers (1975–76)	5–7–2
15	W	November 18, 1975	6–2	@ Calgary Cowboys (1975–76)	6–7–2
16	W	November 20, 1975	5–1	Denver Spurs/Ottawa Civics (1975–76)	7–7–2
17	L	November 22, 1975	2–3 OT	Edmonton Oilers (1975–76)	7–8–2
18	W	November 25, 1975	7–2	Edmonton Oilers (1975–76)	8–8–2
19	W	November 27, 1975	5–1	Quebec Nordiques (1975–76)	9–8–2
20	L	November 29, 1975	4–5 OT	Calgary Cowboys (1975–76)	9–9–2
21	L	November 30, 1975	4–8	@ Houston Aeros (1975–76)	9–10–2

December

Game	Result	Date	Score	Opponent	Record
22	L	December 4, 1975	4–5	Winnipeg Jets (1975–76)	9–11–2
23	W	December 6, 1975	4–1	New England Whalers (1975–76)	10–11–2
24	T	December 11, 1975	3–3	Indianapolis Racers (1975–76)	10–11–3
25	T	December 13, 1975	3–3	Cincinnati Stingers (1975–76)	10–11–4
26	L	December 14, 1975	2–4	@ Phoenix Roadrunners (1975–76)	10–12–4
27	W	December 16, 1975	4–2	@ Houston Aeros (1975–76)	11–12–4
28	W	December 18, 1975	7–3	Cincinnati Stingers (1975–76)	12–12–4
29	L	December 19, 1975	3–6	@ Denver Spurs/Ottawa Civics (1975–76)	12–13–4
30	W	December 21, 1975	3–1	Houston Aeros (1975–76)	13–13–4
31	W	December 23, 1975	10–4	Quebec Nordiques (1975–76)	14–13–4
32	W	December 26, 1975	4–2	Phoenix Roadrunners (1975–76)	15–13–4
33	W	December 28, 1975	2–1	@ Minnesota Fighting Saints (1975–76)	16–13–4
34	L	December 30, 1975	3–5	@ New England Whalers (1975–76)	16–14–4

January

Game	Result	Date	Score	Opponent	Record
35	W	January 2, 1976	2–0	@ Indianapolis Racers (1975–76)	17–14–4
36	L	January 3, 1976	3–5	@ Cincinnati Stingers (1975–76)	17–15–4
37	L	January 6, 1976	4–6	@ Toronto Toros (1975–76)	17–16–4
38	L	January 7, 1976	3–8	@ Cleveland Crusaders (1975–76)	17–17–4
39	W	January 9, 1976	5–3	@ New England Whalers (1975–76)	18–17–4
40	L	January 10, 1976	3–4 OT	@ Quebec Nordiques (1975–76)	18–18–4
41	L	January 11, 1976	4–8	@ New England Whalers (1975–76)	18–19–4
42	W	January 15, 1976	5–4 OT	Minnesota Fighting Saints (1975–76)	19–19–4
43	W	January 17, 1976	5–4	Cleveland Crusaders (1975–76)	20–19–4
44	L	January 21, 1976	5–6 OT	@ Minnesota Fighting Saints (1975–76)	20–20–4
45	W	January 23, 1976	7–1	@ Minnesota Fighting Saints (1975–76)	21–20–4
46	W	January 24, 1976	6–4	Toronto Toros (1975–76)	22–20–4
47	L	January 25, 1976	5–7	@ Phoenix Roadrunners (1975–76)	22–21–4
48	L	January 27, 1976	3–4 OT	Phoenix Roadrunners (1975–76)	22–22–4
49	W	January 29, 1976	1–0	Calgary Cowboys (1975–76)	23–22–4
50	W	January 31, 1976	6–1	Phoenix Roadrunners (1975–76)	24–22–4

February

Game	Result	Date	Score	Opponent	Record
51	W	February 4, 1976	4–1	Minnesota Fighting Saints (1975–76)	25–22–4
52	W	February 5, 1976	3–2	Cleveland Crusaders (1975–76)	26–22–4
53	L	February 8, 1976	2–5	@ Houston Aeros (1975–76)	26–23–4
54	L	February 10, 1976	3–6	@ Minnesota Fighting Saints (1975–76)	26–24–4
55	L	February 11, 1976	2–4	Minnesota Fighting Saints (1975–76)	26–25–4
56	W	February 14, 1976	5–1	Houston Aeros (1975–76)	27–25–4
57	W	February 15, 1976	3–2	@ Indianapolis Racers (1975–76)	28–25–4
58	L	February 17, 1976	2–5	@ Quebec Nordiques (1975–76)	28–26–4
59	W	February 20, 1976	6–4	@ Toronto Toros (1975–76)	29–26–4
60	L	February 21, 1976	2–3	@ Cincinnati Stingers (1975–76)	29–27–4
61	W	February 25, 1976	2–1 OT	@ Minnesota Fighting Saints (1975–76)	30–27–4
62	L	February 27, 1976	3–4	@ Phoenix Roadrunners (1975–76)	30–28–4

March

Game	Result	Date	Score	Opponent	Record
63	L	March 2, 1976	3–4	New England Whalers (1975–76)	30–29–4
64	W	March 4, 1976	8–2	New England Whalers (1975–76)	31–29–4
65	W	March 7, 1976	5–2	Phoenix Roadrunners (1975–76)	32–29–4
66	L	March 9, 1976	2–9	@ Houston Aeros (1975–76)	32–30–4
67	W	March 11, 1976	4–1	Houston Aeros (1975–76)	33–30–4
68	L	March 13, 1976	2–3	Houston Aeros (1975–76)	33–31–4
69	T	March 18, 1976	4–4	@ Indianapolis Racers (1975–76)	33–31–5
70	L	March 19, 1976	3–8	@ Houston Aeros (1975–76)	33–32–5
71	L	March 20, 1976	3–4 OT	Phoenix Roadrunners (1975–76)	33–33–5
72	T	March 23, 1976	8–8	Indianapolis Racers (1975–76)	33–33–6
73	W	March 25, 1976	9–1	Cincinnati Stingers (1975–76)	34–33–6
74	L	March 26, 1976	1–3	@ Phoenix Roadrunners (1975–76)	34–34–6
75	L	March 27, 1976	2–5	Phoenix Roadrunners (1975–76)	34–35–6
76	L	March 28, 1976	1–6	@ Winnipeg Jets (1975–76)	34–36–6
77	W	March 30, 1976	4–3	@ Houston Aeros (1975–76)	35–36–6

April

Game	Result	Date	Score	Opponent	Record
78	L	April 3, 1976	2–4	@ Cleveland Crusaders (1975–76)	35–37–6
79	L	April 4, 1976	2–5	@ Houston Aeros (1975–76)	35–38–6
80	W	April 6, 1976	3–2 OT	@ Cleveland Crusaders (1975–76)	36–38–6

Legend: Win (2 points) Loss (0 points) Tie (1 point)

== Playoffs ==
1976 Avco Cup playoffs
Preliminary round vs. Phoenix Roadrunners – Mariners win 3–2

Game	Date	Visitor	Score	Home	Series
1	April 9	San Diego Mariners	2–3 OT	Phoenix Roadrunners	0–1
2	April 10	Phoenix Roadrunners	2–4	San Diego Mariners	1–1
3	April 13	San Diego Mariners	4–6	Phoenix Roadrunners	1–2
4	April 15	Phoenix Roadrunners	1–5	San Diego Mariners	2–2
5	April 17	San Diego Mariners	2–1	Phoenix Roadrunners	3–2

Quarterfinals vs. Houston Aeros – Aeros win 4–2

Game	Date	Visitor	Score	Home	Series
1	April 21	San Diego Mariners	6–8	Houston Aeros	0–1
2	April 23	San Diego Mariners	1–3	Houston Aeros	0–2
3	April 25	Houston Aeros	8–4	San Diego Mariners	0–3
4	April 27	Houston Aeros	2–3	San Diego Mariners	1–3
5	April 28	San Diego Mariners	3–2	Houston Aeros	2–3
6	April 30	Houston Aeros	3–2	San Diego Mariners	2–4

Legend: Win Loss

== Player statistics ==
Regular season
Scoring

Player	Pos	GP	G	A	Pts	PIM	+/-	PPG	SHG	GWG
Andre Lacroix	C	80	29	72	101	42	-29	12	3	3
Ray Adduono	C	80	23	67	90	22	29	6	0	2
Norm Ferguson	RW	79	37	37	74	12	14	4	0	4
Gene Peacosh	LW	79	37	33	70	35	-5	8	0	6
Joe Noris	C/D	80	28	40	68	24	4	5	3	3
Kevin Morrison	D	80	22	43	65	56	0	7	0	2
John French	C/LW	76	25	39	64	16	-2	6	0	3
Kevin Devine	LW	80	21	28	49	102	2	3	0	2
Wayne Rivers	RW	71	19	25	44	24	-18	10	0	5
Brent Hughes	D	78	7	28	35	63	6	1	0	0
Alex Tidey	RW	74	16	11	27	46	7	2	0	2
Don Burgess	LW	73	14	11	25	35	-17	2	0	1
Bob Wall	D	68	1	20	21	32	3	0	0	0
Bob Falkenberg	D	79	3	13	16	31	-18	0	0	0
Mike McMahon	D	69	2	12	14	38	-5	0	0	0
Brian Morenz	C	40	6	7	13	22	-9	0	0	2
Gary Bredin	RW	50	4	5	9	10	-12	0	0	1
Peter McNamee	D	51	2	3	5	27	-10	0	0	0
Bob Dobek	C	14	3	1	4	2	1	0	0	0
Dave Walter	C	16	1	2	3	6	2	0	0	0
Jim Hargreaves	D	43	1	1	2	26	-3	0	0	0
Ernie Wakely	G	67	0	2	2	6	0	0	0	0
Jamie Bateman	LW	7	1	0	1	4	-1	0	0	0
Bill Goldthorpe	LW	14	1	0	1	30	0	0	0	0
Bob Blanchet	G	1	0	0	0	0	0	0	0	0
Brian Bye	C	1	0	0	0	0	0	0	0	0
Russ Gillow	G	23	0	0	0	0	0	0	0	0
Gary Jacquith	D	2	0	0	0	0	0	0	0	0
Rick Lalonde	D	2	0	0	0	0	-1	0	0	0

Goaltending

Player	MIN	GP	W	L	T	GA	GAA	SO
Ernie Wakely	3823	67	35	27	4	208	3.26	3
Russ Gillow	1037	23	1	10	2	74	4.28	0
Bob Blanchet	32	1	0	1	0	4	7.50	0
Team:	4892	80	36	38	6	286	3.51	3

Playoffs
Scoring

Player	Pos	GP	G	A	Pts	PIM	PPG	SHG	GWG
Ray Adduono	C	11	4	7	11	6	0	0	0
John French	C/LW	11	4	7	11	0	0	0	0
Andre Lacroix	C	11	4	6	10	4	0	0	0
Alex Tidey	RW	11	3	6	9	10	0	0	0
Wayne Rivers	RW	11	4	4	8	4	0	0	0
Don Burgess	LW	11	1	7	8	4	0	0	0
Joe Noris	C/D	11	2	4	6	6	0	0	0
Brent Hughes	D	10	1	5	6	6	0	0	0
Kevin Morrison	D	11	1	5	6	12	0	0	0
Kevin Devine	LW	11	3	1	4	36	0	0	0
Bob Wall	D	11	1	3	4	4	0	0	0
Brian Morenz	C	11	2	1	3	11	0	0	0
Gene Peacosh	LW	11	2	1	3	21	0	0	0
Bob Dobek	C	11	1	2	3	0	0	0	0
Bob Falkenberg	D	11	1	2	3	6	0	0	0
Norm Ferguson	RW	4	2	0	2	9	0	0	0
Mike McMahon	D	9	0	1	1	2	0	0	0
Peter McNamee	D	11	0	1	1	28	0	0	0
Russ Gillow	G	1	0	0	0	0	0	0	0
Jim Hargreaves	D	5	0	0	0	2	0	0	0
Ernie Wakely	G	11	0	0	0	4	0	0	0

Goaltending

Player	MIN	GP	W	L	GA	GAA	SO
Ernie Wakely	640	11	5	6	39	3.66	0
Russ Gillow	20	1	0	0	0	0.00	0
Team:	660	11	5	6	39	3.55	0

Note: Pos = Position; GP = Games played; G = Goals; A = Assists; Pts = Points; +/- = plus/minus; PIM = Penalty minutes; PPG = Power-play goals; SHG = Short-handed goals; GWG = Game-winning goals
MIN = Minutes played; W = Wins; L = Losses; T = Ties; GA = Goals-against; GAA = Goals-against average; SO = Shutouts;

== Draft picks ==
San Diego's draft picks at the 1975 WHA Amateur Draft.

Round	#	Player	Nationality	College/Junior/Club team (League)
1	12	Jamie Masters (D)	Canada	Ottawa 67's (OHA)
2	27	Rick Adduono (C)	Canada	St. Catharines Black Hawks (OHA)
3	42	Bob Watson (RW)	Canada	Flin Flon Bombers (WCHL)
4	57	Dan Blair (RW)	Canada	Ottawa 67's (OHA)
5	71	Craig Crawford (C)	Canada	Toronto Marlboros (OHA)
6	85	Alex Tidey (RW)	Canada	Lethbridge Broncos (WCHL)
7	98	Rick Lalonde (D)	Canada	Calgary Centennials (WCHL)
8	110	Kelly Secord (F)	Canada	New Westminster Bruins (WCHL)
9	122	Alex Forsyth (F)	Canada	Kingston Canadians (OHA)
10	135	Don Edwards (G)	Canada	Kitchener Rangers (OHA)
11	148	Dale Anderson (D)	Canada	Brandon Wheat Kings (WCHL)
12	159	Bruce O'Grady (F)	Canada	Sault Ste. Marie Greyhounds (OHA)

== See also ==
- 1975–76 WHA season
