= 1975–76 Cincinnati Stingers season =

1975–76 Cincinnati Stingers
- Division: 4th East
- 1975–76 record: 35–44–1
- Home record: 26–14–0
- Road record: 9–30–1
- Goals for: 285
- Goals against: 340

Team information
- Coach: Terry Slater
- Captain: Mike Pelyk
- Alternate captains: Bryan Campbell; Rick Dudley
- Arena: Riverfront Coliseum

Team leaders
- Goals: Rick Dudley (43)
- Assists: Bryan Campbell (50)
- Points: Rick Dudley (81)
- Penalty minutes: John Hughes (204)
- Wins: Paul Hoganson (19)
- Goals against average: Paul Hoganson (3.64)

The 1975–76 Cincinnati Stingers season was the Stingers' first season of operation in the World Hockey Association (WHA).

== Regular season ==
=== Final standings ===
Eastern Division	GP	W	L	T	Pts	GF	GA	PIM
Indianapolis Racers	80	35	39	6	76	245	247	1301
Cleveland Crusaders	80	35	40	5	75	273	279	1356
New England Whalers	80	33	40	7	73	255	290	1012
Cincinnati Stingers	80	35	44	1	71	285	340	1344

== Schedule and results ==
1975–76 regular season
October

Game	Result	Date	Score	Opponent	Record
2	W	October 17, 1975	6–2	@ Calgary Cowboys (1975–76)	2–0–0
3	L	October 19, 1975	2–4	@ Edmonton Oilers (1975–76)	2–1–0
4	L	October 21, 1975	0–7	@ Winnipeg Jets (1975–76)	2–2–0
5	W	October 23, 1975	6–4	Edmonton Oilers (1975–76)	3–2–0
6	W	October 25, 1975	7–4	Houston Aeros (1975–76)	4–2–0
7	W	October 29, 1975	6–4	@ Minnesota Fighting Saints (1975–76)	5–2–0
8	L	October 30, 1975	0–4	@ Winnipeg Jets (1975–76)	5–3–0

November

Game	Result	Date	Score	Opponent	Record
9	W	November 1, 1975	3–2	Calgary Cowboys (1975–76)	6–3–0
10	L	November 6, 1975	3–8	@ New England Whalers (1975–76)	6–4–0
11	W	November 8, 1975	7–4	San Diego Mariners (1975–76)	7–4–0
12	W	November 9, 1975	4–2	New England Whalers (1975–76)	8–4–0
13	W	November 15, 1975	8–5	Houston Aeros (1975–76)	9–4–0
14	L	November 16, 1975	2–3	Minnesota Fighting Saints (1975–76)	9–5–0
15	L	November 18, 1975	4–6	@ Quebec Nordiques (1975–76)	9–6–0
16	L	November 21, 1975	7–8	@ Toronto Toros (1975–76)	9–7–0
17	L	November 22, 1975	6–9	Quebec Nordiques (1975–76)	9–8–0
18	L	November 23, 1975	3–5	@ Denver Spurs/Ottawa Civics (1975–76)	9–9–0
19	L	November 26, 1975	3–11	Winnipeg Jets (1975–76)	9–10–0
20	L	November 27, 1975	3–5	@ Minnesota Fighting Saints (1975–76)	9–11–0
21	L	November 29, 1975	5–9	Toronto Toros (1975–76)	9–12–0

December

Game	Result	Date	Score	Opponent	Record
22	W	December 3, 1975	5–3	@ Cleveland Crusaders (1975–76)	10–12–0
23	L	December 4, 1975	1–7	@ Indianapolis Racers (1975–76)	10–13–0
24	W	December 6, 1975	3–2	Denver Spurs/Ottawa Civics (1975–76)	11–13–0
25	W	December 7, 1975	3–1	Cleveland Crusaders (1975–76)	12–13–0
26	L	December 9, 1975	4–6	@ Houston Aeros (1975–76)	12–14–0
27	W	December 12, 1975	4–2	@ Phoenix Roadrunners (1975–76)	13–14–0
28	T	December 13, 1975	3–3	@ San Diego Mariners (1975–76)	13–14–1
29	L	December 16, 1975	2–3 OT	@ Denver Spurs/Ottawa Civics (1975–76)	13–15–1
30	L	December 18, 1975	3–7	@ San Diego Mariners (1975–76)	13–16–1
31	W	December 20, 1975	4–2	New England Whalers (1975–76)	14–16–1
32	W	December 21, 1975	11–7	Quebec Nordiques (1975–76)	15–16–1
33	L	December 23, 1975	3–5	Phoenix Roadrunners (1975–76)	15–17–1
34	L	December 26, 1975	3–4	@ New England Whalers (1975–76)	15–18–1
35	L	December 27, 1975	1–2	@ Indianapolis Racers (1975–76)	15–19–1
36	W	December 28, 1975	4–1	Indianapolis Racers (1975–76)	16–19–1

January

Game	Result	Date	Score	Opponent	Record
37	W	January 2, 1976	2–1	Denver Spurs/Ottawa Civics (1975–76)	17–19–1
38	W	January 3, 1976	5–3	San Diego Mariners (1975–76)	18–19–1
39	L	January 6, 1976	3–7	@ Houston Aeros (1975–76)	18–20–1
40	L	January 8, 1976	1–7	@ Phoenix Roadrunners (1975–76)	18–21–1
41	L	January 11, 1976	4–7	Minnesota Fighting Saints (1975–76)	18–22–1
42	L	January 15, 1976	2–5	@ New England Whalers (1975–76)	18–23–1
43	W	January 17, 1976	4–0	@ Indianapolis Racers (1975–76)	19–23–1
44	W	January 21, 1976	8–2	Cleveland Crusaders (1975–76)	20–23–1
45	L	January 23, 1976	3–4	@ Indianapolis Racers (1975–76)	20–24–1
46	W	January 24, 1976	6–3	New England Whalers (1975–76)	21–24–1
47	L	January 27, 1976	1–9	@ Quebec Nordiques (1975–76)	21–25–1
48	L	January 28, 1976	4–6	Cleveland Crusaders (1975–76)	21–26–1
49	L	January 31, 1976	2–5	Winnipeg Jets (1975–76)	21–27–1

February

Game	Result	Date	Score	Opponent	Record
50	L	February 1, 1976	2–5	@ Edmonton Oilers (1975–76)	21–28–1
51	L	February 3, 1976	2–3	@ Calgary Cowboys (1975–76)	21–29–1
52	W	February 6, 1976	7–0	Edmonton Oilers (1975–76)	22–29–1
53	L	February 7, 1976	1–5	@ Indianapolis Racers (1975–76)	22–30–1
54	L	February 11, 1976	2–4	@ Cleveland Crusaders (1975–76)	22–31–1
55	W	February 13, 1976	5–1	@ New England Whalers (1975–76)	23–31–1
56	W	February 14, 1976	3–2	Indianapolis Racers (1975–76)	24–31–1
57	W	February 15, 1976	5–4 OT	Calgary Cowboys (1975–76)	25–31–1
58	W	February 20, 1976	4–1	Phoenix Roadrunners (1975–76)	26–31–1
59	W	February 21, 1976	3–2	San Diego Mariners (1975–76)	27–31–1
60	W	February 24, 1976	9–6	@ Toronto Toros (1975–76)	28–31–1
61	W	February 25, 1976	5–2	New England Whalers (1975–76)	29–31–1
62	L	February 28, 1976	2–4	Houston Aeros (1975–76)	29–32–1
63	L	February 29, 1976	2–5	Indianapolis Racers (1975–76)	29–33–1

March

Game	Result	Date	Score	Opponent	Record
64	W	March 3, 1976	4–3 OT	Cleveland Crusaders (1975–76)	30–33–1
65	L	March 4, 1976	1–3	@ Indianapolis Racers (1975–76)	30–34–1
66	L	March 6, 1976	2–3	Indianapolis Racers (1975–76)	30–35–1
67	W	March 7, 1976	5–3	New England Whalers (1975–76)	31–35–1
68	L	March 10, 1976	2–5	@ Cleveland Crusaders (1975–76)	31–36–1
69	L	March 12, 1976	3–6	Indianapolis Racers (1975–76)	31–37–1
70	L	March 13, 1976	1–5	New England Whalers (1975–76)	31–38–1
71	W	March 17, 1976	5–4	Toronto Toros (1975–76)	32–38–1
72	L	March 19, 1976	5–6 OT	@ New England Whalers (1975–76)	32–39–1
73	W	March 20, 1976	2–1	Houston Aeros (1975–76)	33–39–1
74	L	March 21, 1976	1–4	@ Cleveland Crusaders (1975–76)	33–40–1
75	W	March 24, 1976	5–4	@ Phoenix Roadrunners (1975–76)	34–40–1
76	L	March 25, 1976	1–9	@ San Diego Mariners (1975–76)	34–41–1
77	L	March 26, 1976	1–5	@ Houston Aeros (1975–76)	34–42–1
78	L	March 31, 1976	2–7	Phoenix Roadrunners (1975–76)	34–43–1

April

Game	Result	Date	Score	Opponent	Record
79	W	April 2, 1976	5–2	Cleveland Crusaders (1975–76)	35–43–1
80	L	April 4, 1976	3–6	@ Cleveland Crusaders (1975–76)	35–44–1

Legend: Win (2 points) Loss (0 points) Tie (1 point)

== Draft picks ==
Cincinnati's draft picks at the 1975 WHA Amateur Draft.

Round	#	Player	Nationality	College/Junior/Club team (League)
1	1	Claude Larose (LW)	Canada	Sherbrooke Castors (QMJHL)
2	16	Bob Sauve (G)	Canada	Laval National (QMJHL)
3	31	Larry Hendrick (G)	Canada	Calgary Centennials (WCHL)
4	46	Norm LaPointe (G)	Canada	Trois-Rivieres Draveurs (QMJHL)
5	61	Paul Harrison (G)	Canada	Oshawa Generals (OHA)
6	75	Jackie Laine (F)	Canada	Bowling Green State University (CCHA)
7	89	Gary Carr (G)	Canada	Toronto Marlboros (OHA)
8	102	Greg Clause (RW)	Canada	Hamilton Fincups (OHA)
9	114	Yvon Disotell (F)	Canada	Cornwall Royals (QMJHL)
10	126	Gary Burns (F)	United States	University of New Hampshire (ECAC)
11	139	Bill Reber (RW)	United States	University of Vermont (ECAC)
12	151	David McNab (G)	Canada	University of Wisconsin (WCHA)
13	161	Peter Shier (D)	Canada	Cornell University (ECAC)
14	170	Francois Robert (D)	Canada	Sherbrooke Castors (QMJHL)

== See also ==
- 1975–76 WHA season
