= Chris Grigg (ice hockey) =

Canadian ice hockey player

- Born: February 2, 1953 (age 73) Hamilton, Ontario, Canada
- Height: 6 ft 1 in (185 cm)
- Weight: 180 lb (82 kg; 12 st 12 lb)
- Position: Goaltender
- Caught: Left
- Played for: WHA; Denver Spurs; Ottawa Civics; NAHL; Long Island Cougars; Syracuse Blazers
- NHL draft: Undrafted
- Playing career: 1974–1976

Christopher Robert William Grigg (born February 2, 1953) is a Canadian former professional ice hockey goaltender.

== Career ==
During the 1975–76 season, Grigg played two games in the World Hockey Association with the Denver Spurs/Ottawa Civics. In the North American Hockey League, he played for the Long Island Cougars and Syracuse Blazers.

== Career statistics ==
=== Regular season and playoffs ===
			Regular season									Playoffs
Season	Team	League	GP	W	L	T	MIN	GA	SO	GAA	SV%	GP	W	L	MIN	GA	SO	GAA	SV%
1971–72	Colgate University	ECAC	9	Statistics Unavailable
1972–73	Colgate University	ECAC	16	—	—	—	900	82	0	5.46	.873	—	—	—	—	—	—	—	—
1973–74	Colgate University	ECAC	28	—	—	—	1670	129	0	4.63	.879	—	—	—	—	—	—	—	—
1974–75	Long Island Cougars	NAHL	33	9	18	2	1709	121	2	4.25	—	—	—	—	—	—	—	—	—
1975–76	Denver Spurs/Ottawa Civics	WHA	2	—	—	—	80	13	0	9.75	.780	—	—	—	—	—	—	—	—
1975–76	Syracuse Blazers	NAHL	11	4	5	0	499	41	0	4.93	—	—	—	—	—	—	—	—	—
WHA totals			2	—	—	—	80	13	0	9.75	.780	—	—	—	—	—	—	—	—
