= Del Hall =

Canadian ice hockey player

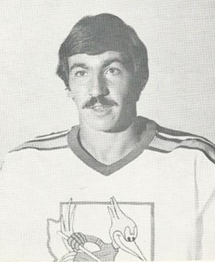
- Born: May 7, 1949 (age 76) Peterborough, Ontario, Canada
- Height: 5 ft 10 in (178 cm)
- Weight: 175 lb (79 kg; 12 st 7 lb)
- Position: Left wing
- Shot: Left
- Played for: NHL; California Golden Seals; WHA; Phoenix Roadrunners; Cincinnati Stingers; Edmonton Oilers
- Playing career: 1971–1978

Del Allison Hall (born May 7, 1949) is a Canadian former professional ice hockey left wing.

Hall started his professional career with the California Golden Seals of the National Hockey League (NHL) in the 1971–72 NHL season, but played only nine games in the NHL over four seasons, spending the majority of those years with the organization's minor league farm teams in the IHL, WHL and CHL.

Hall moved to the rival World Hockey Association (WHA) for the 1975–76 WHA season, recording two extremely productive offensive seasons with the Phoenix Roadrunners. He started the 1977–78 WHA season with the Cincinnati Stingers, playing 25 games before being traded to the Edmonton Oilers mid-season, where he played one more game before retiring.

== Career statistics ==
=== Regular season and playoffs ===
| | | | Regular season | | | | | Playoffs |
| Season | Team | League | GP | G | A | Pts | PIM | GP | G | A | Pts | PIM |
|---|---|---|---|---|---|---|---|---|---|---|---|---|
| 1969–70 | Chatham Maroons | WOJHL | 40 | 53 | 46 | 99 | — | — | — | — | — | — |
| 1970–71 | St. Clair College | OCAA | 22 | 23 | 30 | 53 | 26 | — | — | — | — | — |
| 1971–72 | California Golden Seals | NHL | 1 | 0 | 0 | 0 | 0 | — | — | — | — | — |
| 1971–72 | Columbus Golden Seals | IHL | 64 | 26 | 27 | 53 | 18 | — | — | — | — | — |
| 1972–73 | California Golden Seals | NHL | 6 | 0 | 0 | 0 | 0 | — | — | — | — | — |
| 1972–73 | Salt Lake Golden Eagles | WHL | 63 | 24 | 18 | 42 | 23 | 9 | 5 | 4 | 9 | 0 |
| 1973–74 | California Golden Seals | NHL | 2 | 2 | 0 | 2 | 2 | — | — | — | — | — |
| 1973–74 | Salt Lake Golden Eagles | WHL | 71 | 38 | 41 | 79 | 30 | 5 | 1 | 0 | 1 | 0 |
| 1974–75 | Salt Lake Golden Eagles | CHL | 70 | 32 | 32 | 64 | 4 | 11 | 7 | 8 | 15 | 6 |
| 1975–76 | Phoenix Roadrunners | WHA | 80 | 47 | 44 | 91 | 10 | 5 | 2 | 3 | 5 | 0 |
| 1976–77 | Phoenix Roadrunners | WHA | 80 | 38 | 41 | 79 | 30 | — | — | — | — | — |
| 1977–78 | Cincinnati Stingers | WHA | 25 | 4 | 3 | 7 | 4 | — | — | — | — | — |
| 1977–78 | Edmonton Oilers | WHA | 1 | 0 | 0 | 0 | 0 | — | — | — | — | — |
| WHA totals | | | 186 | 89 | 88 | 177 | 44 | 5 | 2 | 3 | 5 | 0 |
| NHL totals | | | 9 | 2 | 0 | 2 | 2 | — | — | — | — | — |
