= Bryon Baltimore =

Canadian ice hockey player (born 1952)

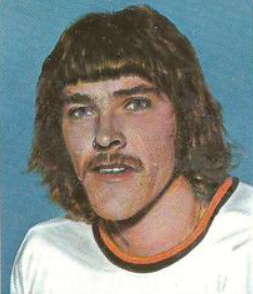
- Born: August 26, 1952 (age 74) Whitehorse, Yukon, Canada
- Height: 6 ft 2 in (188 cm)
- Weight: 190 lb (86 kg; 13 st 8 lb)
- Position: Defence
- Shot: Right
- Played for: Chicago Cougars; Denver Spurs; Ottawa Civics; Indianapolis Racers; Cincinnati Stingers; Edmonton Oilers
- NHL draft: Undrafted
- WHA draft: Undrafted
- Playing career: 1972–1981

Bryon Donald Baltimore (born August 26, 1952) is a Canadian former professional ice hockey player, who played in the NHL and WHA.

Baltimore started his hockey career playing two seasons for the University of Alberta. He then joined the AHL's Springfield Kings. He was called up by the Los Angeles Kings for the 1974 playoffs but he did not see any ice time. In 1974, he signed with the Chicago Cougars of the WHA, and he played in the WHA until it folded. In the ensuing dispersal draft, he was picked up by the Edmonton Oilers, with whom he played two games in the 1979–80 season. Baltimore is one of only three Yukon-raised players to participate in an NHL game, the others being Jarrett Deuling and Dylan Cozens.

After his hockey career ended, Baltimore became a litigation lawyer in Edmonton, Alberta, practicing at McCuaig Desrochers LLP where he served as managing partner. Baltimore coached the now defunct Montana Magic in 1983–84 in the CHL. The team had a 20–52–4 record. The league folded after this season.

== Career statistics ==
=== Regular season and playoffs ===
			Regular season					Playoffs
Season	Team	League	GP	G	A	Pts	PIM	GP	G	A	Pts	PIM
1970–71	University of Alberta	CIAU	35	8	15	23	82	—	—	—	—	—
1971–72	University of Alberta	CIAU	34	5	23	28	78	—	—	—	—	—
1972–73	Springfield Kings	AHL	73	15	12	27	36	—	—	—	—	—
1973–74	Springfield Kings	AHL	68	4	21	25	72	—	—	—	—	—
1974–75	Chicago Cougars	WHA	77	8	12	20	110	12	7	9	16	15
1975–76	Denver Spurs/Ottawa Civics	WHA	41	1	8	9	32	—	—	—	—	—
1975–76	Indianapolis Racers	WHA	37	1	10	11	30	7	0	1	1	4
1976–77	Indianapolis Racers	WHA	55	0	15	15	63	9	0	0	0	5
1977–78	Indianapolis Racers	WHA	22	1	7	8	23	—	—	—	—	—
1977–78	Cincinnati Stingers	WHA	28	2	9	11	47	—	—	—	—	—
1978–79	Indianapolis Racers	WHA	14	5	3	8	18	—	—	—	—	—
1978–79	Cincinnati Stingers	WHA	69	4	10	14	83	3	0	0	0	2
1979–80	Edmonton Oilers	NHL	2	0	0	0	4	—	—	—	—	—
1979–80	Houston Apollos	CHL	61	1	25	26	76	6	0	1	1	11
1980–81	Wichita Wind	CHL	46	1	10	11	66	16	0	8	8	20
WHA totals			331	18	72	90	390	19	0	1	1	11
NHL totals			2	0	0	0	2	—	—	—	—	—
