= CKOY =

CKOY may refer to:

- CKOY-FM in Sherbrooke, Quebec,
- a former call sign of CIWW in Ottawa, Ontario,
- a former call sign of CHYK-FM in Timmins, Ontario.
