= Wayne Rutledge =

Canadian ice hockey player

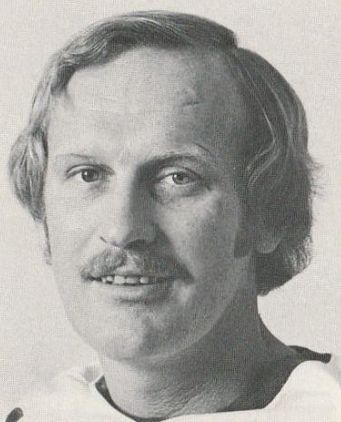
- Born: January 5, 1942 Barrie, Ontario, Canada
- Died: October 5, 2004 (aged 62) Huntsville, Ontario, Canada
- Height: 6 ft 2 in (188 cm)
- Weight: 200 lb (91 kg; 14 st 4 lb)
- Position: Goaltender
- Caught: Left
- Played for: Los Angeles Kings; Houston Aeros
- Playing career: 1962–1978

Wayne Alvin Rutledge (January 5, 1942 – October 5, 2004) was a Canadian professional ice hockey goaltender who played in the National Hockey League (NHL) for the Los Angeles Kings between 1967 and 1970, and the World Hockey Association (WHA) for the Houston Aeros between 1972 and 1978.

He died of stomach cancer in 2004.

== Career statistics ==
=== Regular season and playoffs ===
			Regular season									Playoffs
Season	Team	League	GP	W	L	T	MIN	GA	SO	GAA	SV%	GP	W	L	MIN	GA	SO	GAA	SV%
1959–60	Barrie Flyers	OHA	48	24	18	6	2840	168	3	3.55	—	6	—	—	300	30	0	5.00	—
1960–61	Niagara Falls Flyers	OHA	47	22	20	5	2790	159	2	3.42	—	6	—	—	300	37	0	6.17	—
1961–62	Niagara Falls Flyers	OHA	43	—	—	—	2580	163	2	3.79	—	10	—	—	600	36	0	3.60	—
1962–63	Windsor Bulldogs	OHA Sr	30	—	—	—	1800	95	2	3.17	—	11	—	—	660	22	3	2.00	—
1962–63	Clinton Comets	EHL	5	—	—	—	300	20	1	4.00	—	—	—	—	—	—	—	—	—
1962–63	Kingston Frontenacs	EPHL	4	3	1	0	240	9	0	2.25	—	—	—	—	—	—	—	—	—
1962–63	Windsor Bulldogs	Al-Cup	—	—	—	—	—	—	—	—	—	13	11	2	790	34	1	2.58	—
1963–64	Windsor Bulldogs	IHL	65	—	—	—	3900	243	0	3.74	—	6	2	4	360	20	0	3.33	—
1964–65	St. Paul Rangers	CHL	39	22	16	1	2320	134	2	3.47	—	—	—	—	—	—	—	—	—
1965–66	Minnesota Rangers	CHL	70	34	25	11	4200	197	7	2.81	—	7	3	4	454	19	1	2.51	—
1966–67	Omaha Knights	CHL	70	36	24	10	4200	203	2	2.90	—	12	5	7	742	36	1	2.91	—
1967–68	Los Angeles Kings	NHL	45	21	15	5	2441	117	2	2.88	.897	3	1	2	150	8	0	3.22	.890
1968–69	Los Angeles Kings	NHL	17	5	11	1	922	57	0	3.71	.883	5	1	3	229	12	0	3.15	.894
1969–70	Los Angeles Kings	NHL	20	2	12	1	956	68	0	4.27	.891	—	—	—	—	—	—	—	—
1969–70	Springfield Kings	AHL	6	—	—	—	340	23	0	4.06	—	—	—	—	—	—	—	—	—
1969–70	Long Island Ducks	EHL	3	—	—	—	180	21	0	7.00	—	—	—	—	—	—	—	—	—
1970–71	Denver Spurs	WHL	47	15	18	12	2648	142	3	3.22	—	3	1	2	198	13	0	3.94	—
1971–72	Salt Lake Golden Eagles	WHL	60	24	27	8	3517	206	1	3.51	—	—	—	—	—	—	—	—	—
1972–73	Houston Aeros	WHA	36	20	14	2	2163	110	0	3.05	.908	7	4	3	422	20	0	2.84	—
1973–74	Houston Aeros	WHA	25	12	12	1	1509	84	0	3.34	.86	—	—	—	—	—	—	—	—
1974–75	Houston Aeros	WHA	35	20	15	0	2098	113	2	3.23	.892	—	—	—	—	—	—	—	—
1975–76	Houston Aeros	WHA	25	14	10	0	1456	77	1	3.17	.901	4	1	2	200	10	0	3.00	—
1976–77	Houston Aeros	WHA	42	23	14	4	2512	132	3	3.15	.891	2	2	0	120	4	0	2.00	—
1977–78	Houston Aeros	WHA	12	4	7	0	634	47	0	4.45	.869	3	1	2	131	8	0	3.66	—
1978–79	Orillia Terriers	OHA Sr	17	—	—	—	1020	119	0	7.00	—	—	—	—	—	—	—	—	—
WHA totals			176	94	72	7	10,372	682	6	3.24	.894	—	—	—	—	—	—	—	—
NHL totals			82	28	38	7	4318	242	2	3.36	.892	8	2	5	378	20	0	3.18	.892
