= Kim Clackson =

Canadian ice hockey player (born 1955)

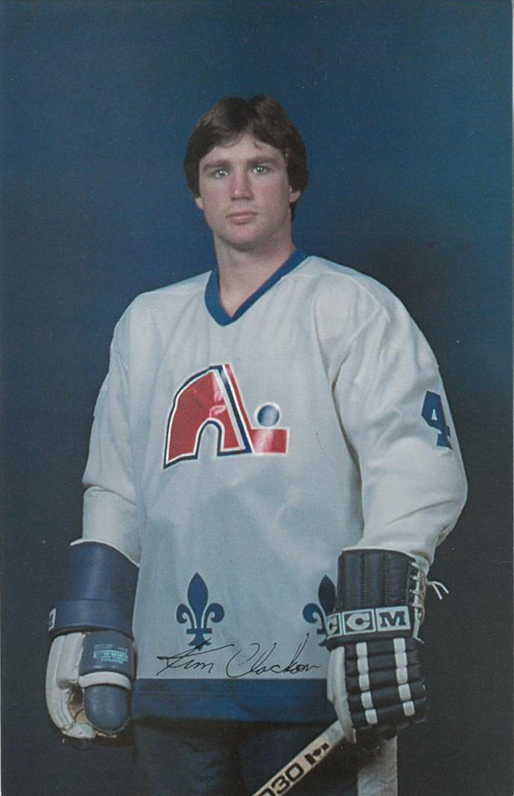
- Born: February 13, 1955 (age 71) Saskatoon, Saskatchewan, Canada
- Height: 5 ft 10 in (178 cm)
- Weight: 195 lb (88 kg; 13 st 13 lb)
- Position: Defence
- Shot: Right
- Played for: Indianapolis Racers; Winnipeg Jets; Pittsburgh Penguins; Quebec Nordiques
- National team: Canada
- NHL draft: 85th overall, 1975; Pittsburgh Penguins
- WHA draft: 25th overall, 1975; Minnesota Fighting Saints
- Playing career: 1975–1981

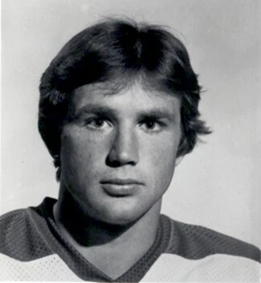
Clackson in 1978 photo for Winnipeg Jets

Kimbel Gerald Clackson (born February 13, 1955) is a Canadian former professional ice hockey defenceman who played 106 games in the National Hockey League (NHL) and 271 games in the World Hockey Association (WHA). Clackson played for the Winnipeg Jets, Quebec Nordiques, Pittsburgh Penguins, and Indianapolis Racers. He shares the NHL record for most penalties in a single playoff game (alongside Forbes Kennedy and Dale Hunter), having committed eight on April 14, 1980, against the Boston Bruins.

Clackson's elder son, Matt, was drafted by the Philadelphia Flyers and played 270 games in the American Hockey League (AHL). Another son, Chris, played in the AHL and the ECHL.

== Career statistics ==
			Regular Season					Playoffs
Season	Team	League	GP	G	A	Pts	PIM	GP	G	A	Pts	PIM
1972–73	Victoria Cougars	WCHL	64	1	1	2	235	—	—	—	—	—
1973–74	Victoria Cougars	WCHL	1	0	0	0	0	—	—	—	—	—
1973–74	Flin Flon Bombers	WCHL	47	2	6	8	263	—	—	—	—	—
1974–75	Victoria Cougars	WCHL	58	7	26	33	359	12	0	6	6	99
1975–76	Indianapolis Racers	WHA	77	1	12	13	351	—	—	—	—	—
1976–77	Indianapolis Racers	WHA	71	3	8	11	168	9	0	1	1	24
1977–78	Winnipeg Jets	WHA	52	2	7	9	203	9	0	1	1	61
1978–79	Winnipeg Jets	WHA	71	0	12	12	210	9	0	5	5	28
1979–80	Pittsburgh Penguins	NHL	45	0	3	3	166	3	0	0	0	37
1980–81	Quebec Nordiques	NHL	61	0	5	5	204	5	0	0	0	33
NHL totals			106	0	8	8	370	8	0	0	0	70
WHA totals			271	6	39	45	932	27	0	7	7	113
