= 1975–76 Toronto Toros season =

Canadian ice hockey team season

1975–76 Toronto Toros
- League: 12th WHA
- Division: 5th Canadian
- 1975–76 record: 24–52–5
- Home record: 16–20–4
- Road record: 8–32–1
- Goals for: 335
- Goals against: 398

Team information
- Coach: Bob Baun; Gilles Leger
- Captain: Frank Mahovlich
- Alternate captains: Jim Dorey; Gavin Kirk
- Arena: Maple Leaf Gardens
- Average attendance: 8,983

Team leaders
- Goals: Vaclav Nedomansky (56)
- Assists: Frank Mahovlich (55)
- Points: Vaclav Nedomansky (98)
- Penalty minutes: Jerry Rollins (185)
- Wins: Dave Tataryn (7)
- Goals against average: John Garrett (3.59)

The 1975–76 Toronto Toros season was the team's third season in Toronto, fourth of the franchise. The Toros missed the playoffs.

Bob Baun was relieved of his head coaching duties on February 16 after a 7-6 away loss to the Jets. He was replaced by general manager Gilles Leger.

== Regular season ==
=== Season standings ===
Canadian Division	GP	W	L	T	Pts	GF	GA	PIM
Winnipeg Jets	81	52	27	2	106	345	254	940
Quebec Nordiques	81	50	27	4	104	371	316	1654
Calgary Cowboys	80	41	35	4	86	307	282	1064
Edmonton Oilers	81	27	49	5	59	268	345	991
Toronto Toros	81	24	52	5	53	335	398	1099
Denver Spurs / Ottawa Civics+	41	14	26	1	29	134	172	536

+team started season in Western Division when playing in Denver; transferred by league to Canadian Division shortly after moving to Ottawa.

== Schedule and results ==
1975–76 regular season
October

Game	Date	Visitor	Score	Home	Record	Pts
1	October 11	Toronto Toros	3–7	Quebec Nordiques	0–1–0	0
2	October 14	Houston Aeros	3–6	Toronto Toros	1–1–0	2
3	October 17	Edmonton Oilers	4–4	Toronto Toros	1–1–1	3
4	October 18	Toronto Toros	1–3	New England Whalers	1–2–1	3
5	October 24	New England Whalers	5–4	Toronto Toros	1–3–1	3
6	October 25	Toronto Toros	2–3	Quebec Nordiques	1–4–1	3
7	October 28	Quebec Nordiques	4–6	Toronto Toros	2–4–1	5

November

Game	Date	Visitor	Score	Home	Record	Pts
8	November 4	Toronto Toros	3–4	Indianapolis Racers	2–5–1	5
9	November 7	Toronto Toros	4–5 OT	Edmonton Oilers	2–6–1	5
10	November 8	Toronto Toros	3–4	Minnesota Fighting Saints	2–7–1	5
11	November 9	Toronto Toros	3–5	Winnipeg Jets	2–8–1	5
12	November 11	Toronto Toros	4–5	Houston Aeros	2–9–1	5
13	November 13	Toronto Toros	11–8	Denver Spurs/Ottawa Civics	3–9–1	7
14	November 14	Toronto Toros	2–2	Phoenix Roadrunners	3–9–2	8
15	November 15	Toronto Toros	6–4	San Diego Mariners	4–9–2	10
16	November 17	Indianapolis Racers	6–2	Toronto Toros	4–10–2	10
17	November 21	Cincinnati Stingers	7–8	Toronto Toros	5–10–2	12
18	November 25	Cleveland Crusaders	4–3 OT	Toronto Toros	5–11–2	12
19	November 28	Winnipeg Jets	5–3	Toronto Toros	5–12–2	12
20	November 29	Toronto Toros	9–5	Cincinnati Stingers	6–12–2	14
21	November 30	Toronto Toros	9–10	Cleveland Crusaders	6–13–2	14

December

Game	Date	Visitor	Score	Home	Record	Pts
22	December 2	Toronto Toros	2–7	Edmonton Oilers	6–14–2	14
23	December 3	Toronto Toros	4–3	Calgary Cowboys	7–14–2	16
24	December 5	Quebec Nordiques	4–7	Toronto Toros	8–14–2	18
25	December 9	Minnesota Fighting Saints	5–3	Toronto Toros	8–15–2	18
26	December 10	Toronto Toros	5–6 OT	Winnipeg Jets	8–16–2	18
27	December 12	Quebec Nordiques	4–6	Toronto Toros	9–16–2	20
28	December 13	Toronto Toros	3–6	Quebec Nordiques	9–17–2	20
29	December 14	Calgary Cowboys	3–3	Toronto Toros	9–17–3	21
30	December 16	Winnipeg Jets	4–3	Toronto Toros	9–18–3	21
31	December 19	Calgary Cowboys	5–3	Toronto Toros	9–19–3	21
32	December 21	Toronto Toros	4–2	Edmonton Oilers	10–19–3	23
33	December 23	Toronto Toros	1–10	Calgary Cowboys	10–20–3	23
34	December 26	Edmonton Oilers	6–8	Toronto Toros	11–20–3	25
35	December 27	Toronto Toros	0–5	Cleveland Crusaders	11–21–3	25
36	December 28	Quebec Nordiques	6–1	Toronto Toros	11–22–3	25
37	December 30	Edmonton Oilers	3–6	Toronto Toros	12–22–3	27

January

Game	Date	Visitor	Score	Home	Record	Pts
38	January 2	Phoenix Roadrunners	1–4	Toronto Toros	13–22–3	29
39	January 6	San Diego Mariners	4–6	Toronto Toros	14–22–3	31
40	January 7	Toronto Toros	2–8	Winnipeg Jets	14–23–3	31
41	January 9	Toronto Toros	3–5	Edmonton Oilers	14–24–3	31
42	January 17	Toronto Toros	3–4 OT	Quebec Nordiques	14–25–3	31
43	January 20	Toronto Toros	7–5	Houston Aeros	15–25–3	33
44	January 22	Toronto Toros	4–6	Phoenix Roadrunners	15–26–3	33
45	January 24	Toronto Toros	4–6	San Diego Mariners	15–27–3	33
46	January 25	Toronto Toros	2–5	Minnesota Fighting Saints	15–28–3	33
47	January 27	Edmonton Oilers	4–4	Toronto Toros	15–28–4	34
48	January 30	Quebec Nordiques	3–3	Toronto Toros	15–28–5	35
49	January 31	Toronto Toros	4–8	Quebec Nordiques	15–29–5	35

February

Game	Date	Visitor	Score	Home	Record	Pts
50	February 1	New England Whalers	7–5	Toronto Toros	15–30–5	35
51	February 6	Winnipeg Jets	7–6	Toronto Toros	15–31–5	35
52	February 7	Toronto Toros	3–7	New England Whalers	15–32–5	35
53	February 10	Toronto Toros	3–4	Calgary Cowboys	15–33–5	35
54	February 13	Toronto Toros	3–5	Edmonton Oilers	15–34–5	35
55	February 15	Toronto Toros	6–7	Winnipeg Jets	15–35–5	35
56	February 17	Minnesota Fighting Saints	6–3	Toronto Toros	15–36–5	35
57	February 20	San Diego Mariners	6–4	Toronto Toros	15–37–5	35
58	February 22	Toronto Toros	2–4	Calgary Cowboys	15–38–5	35
59	February 24	Cincinnati Stingers	9–6	Toronto Toros	15–39–5	35
60	February 27	Houston Aeros	7–6 OT	Toronto Toros	15–40–5	35
61	February 29	Winnipeg Jets	7–11	Toronto Toros	16–40–5	37

March

Game	Date	Visitor	Score	Home	Record	Pts
62	March 2	Quebec Nordiques	2–5	Toronto Toros	17–40–5	39
63	March 6	Calgary Cowboys	2–5	Toronto Toros	18–40–5	41
64	March 9	Winnipeg Jets	5–2	Toronto Toros	18–41–5	41
65	March 11	Toronto Toros	1–3	Indianapolis Racers	18–42–5	41
66	March 12	Phoenix Roadrunners	5–2	Toronto Toros	18–43–5	41
67	March 14	Toronto Toros	3–1	Quebec Nordiques	19–43–5	43
68	March 16	Cleveland Crusaders	0–6	Toronto Toros	20–43–5	45
69	March 17	Toronto Toros	4–5	Cincinnati Stingers	20–44–5	45
70	March 19	Quebec Nordiques	4–3 OT	Toronto Toros	20–45–5	45
71	March 20	Toronto Toros	6–5	Cleveland Crusaders	21–45–5	47
72	March 21	Winnipeg Jets	2–5	Toronto Toros	22–45–5	49
73	March 23	Calgary Cowboys	5–6 OT	Toronto Toros	23–45–5	51
74	March 26	Edmonton Oilers	3–7	Toronto Toros	24–45–5	53
75	March 28	Calgary Cowboys	5–4	Toronto Toros	24–46–5	53
76	March 30	Toronto Toros	2–6	Calgary Cowboys	24–47–5	53
77	March 31	Toronto Toros	3–5	Winnipeg Jets	24–48–5	53

April

Game	Date	Visitor	Score	Home	Record	Pts
78	April 2	Indianapolis Racers	3–1	Toronto Toros	24–49–5	53
79	April 3	Toronto Toros	1–5	Quebec Nordiques	24–50–5	53
80	April 4	Quebec Nordiques	5–4 OT	Toronto Toros	24–51–5	53
81	April 6	Toronto Toros	6–10	Quebec Nordiques	24–52–5	53

Legend: Win (2 points) Loss (0 points) Tie (1 point)

== Player statistics ==
=== Scoring leaders ===
Player	GP	G	A	Pts	PIM
Vaclav Nedomansky	81	56	42	98	8
Mark Napier	78	43	50	93	20
Frank Mahovlich	75	34	55	89	14
Gavin Kirk	62	28	38	66	32
Jim Dorey	74	9	51	60	134

=== Goaltending ===
Player	GP	TOI	W	L	T	GA	SO	GAA	Save %
John Garrett	9	551	3	6	0	33	1	3.59	.905
Dave Tataryn	23	1261	7	12	1	100	0	4.76	.873
Wayne Wood	13	781	6	7	0	62	0	4.76	.869
Jim Shaw	16	777	4	7	1	63	0	4.86	.875
Mario Viens	26	1228	4	14	3	105	0	5.13	.873
Les Binkley	7	335	0	6	0	32	0	5.73	.849

== Draft picks ==
Toronto's draft picks at the 1975 WHA Amateur Draft.

Round	#	Player	Nationality	College/Junior/Club team (League)
1	11	Rick Lapointe	Canada	Victoria Cougars (WCHL)
2	26	Jerry Rollins	Canada	Winnipeg Clubs (WCHL)
3	41	Paul Heaver	Canada	Oshawa Generals (OHA)
4	56	Ken Breitenbach	Canada	St. Catharines Black Hawks (OHA)
5	70	Mario Viens	Canada	Cornwall Royals (QMJHL)
6	84	Paul Woods	Canada	Sault Ste. Marie Greyhounds (OHA)
7	97	Byron Shutt	Canada	Bowling Green State University (CCHA)
8	109	Jean-Luc Phaneuf	Canada	Montreal Red White and Blue (QMJHL)
9	121	Gilles Bilodeau	Canada	Sorel Black Hawks (QMJHL)
10	134	Roger Dorey	Canada	Kingston Canadians (OHA)
11	147	Bob Ritchie	Canada	Sorel Black Hawks (QMJHL)
12	158	Bob Shaw	Canada	Clarkson University (ECAC)
13	168	Wayne Morrin	Canada	Kamloops Chiefs (WCHL)
14	174	Dave Hanson	United States	Colorado College (WCHA)

== See also ==
- 1975–76 WHA season
