= 1975–76 WHA season =

Professional ice hockey league season

- League: World Hockey Association
- Sport: Ice hockey
- Duration: October 9, 1975 – May 27, 1976

Draft
- Top draft pick: Claude Larose
- Picked by: Cincinnati Stingers

Regular season
- Season champions: Houston Aeros
- Season MVP: Marc Tardif (Quebec)
- Top scorer: Marc Tardif (Quebec)

Playoffs
- Playoffs MVP: Ulf Nilsson (Jets)

Avco Cup Final
- Champions: Winnipeg Jets
- Runners-up: Houston Aeros

WHA seasons
- 1974–75 1976–77

The 1975–76 WHA season was the fourth season of the World Hockey Association. After the Baltimore Blades and Chicago Cougars folded, the league stayed at 14 teams by adding the Cincinnati Stingers and Denver Spurs. In addition, the Vancouver Blazers franchise moved to Calgary and became the Cowboys. Midway through the season, the Spurs moved to Ottawa and became the Civics, though the team folded shortly thereafter when the sale of the franchise fell through. The Minnesota Fighting Saints became the second team to fold mid-season when the franchise was not financially successful, despite having a winning record at the time. Theoretically, fourteen teams would play 80 games each, but only twelve teams finished the season, with cancelled games involving the Civics or Saints being rescheduled on the fly, and four of five Canadian Division teams played 81 games, as a result.

== Regular season ==
=== Final standings ===
Canadian Division	GP	W	L	T	Pts	GF	GA	PIM
Winnipeg Jets	81	52	27	2	106	345	254	940
Quebec Nordiques	81	50	27	4	104	371	316	1654
Calgary Cowboys	80	41	35	4	86	307	282	1064
Edmonton Oilers	81	27	49	5	59	268	345	991
Toronto Toros	81	24	52	5	53	335	398	1099
Denver Spurs / Ottawa Civics+	41	14	26	1	29	134	172	536

+team started season in Western Division when playing in Denver; transferred by league to Canadian Division shortly after moving to Ottawa.

Eastern Division	GP	W	L	T	Pts	GF	GA	PIM
Indianapolis Racers	80	35	39	6	76	245	247	1301
Cleveland Crusaders	80	35	40	5	75	273	279	1356
New England Whalers	80	33	40	7	73	255	290	1012
Cincinnati Stingers	80	35	44	1	71	285	340	1344

Western Division	GP	W	L	T	Pts	GF	GA	PIM
Houston Aeros	80	53	27	0	106	341	263	1093
Phoenix Roadrunners	80	39	35	6	84	302	287	1292
San Diego Mariners	80	36	38	6	78	303	290	716
Minnesota Fighting Saints	59	30	25	4	64	211	212	1354

== Player stats ==
=== Scoring leaders ===
GP = Games played; G = Goals; A = Assists; Pts = Points; PIM = Penalty minutes

Player	Team	GP	G	A	Pts	PIM
Marc Tardif	Quebec Nordiques	81	71	77	148	79
Bobby Hull	Winnipeg Jets	80	53	70	123	30
Real Cloutier	Quebec Nordiques	80	60	54	114	27
Ulf Nilsson	Winnipeg Jets	78	38	76	114	54
Robbie Ftorek	Phoenix Roadrunners	80	41	72	113	109
Chris Bordeleau	Quebec Nordiques	74	37	72	109	42
Anders Hedberg	Winnipeg Jets	76	50	55	105	48
Rejean Houle	Quebec Nordiques	81	51	52	103	61
Serge Bernier	Quebec Nordiques	70	34	68	102	91
Gordie Howe	Houston Aeros	78	32	70	102	76

=== Leading goaltenders ===
_{Bolded numbers indicate season leaders}

GP = Games played; Min = Minutes played; W = Wins; L = Losses; T = Ties, GA = Goals against; GA = Goals against; SO = Shutouts; SV% = Save percentage; GAA = Goals against average

Player	Team	GP	Min	W	L	T	GA	SO	SV%	GAA
Michel Dion	Indianapolis Racers	31	1860	14	15	1	85	0	**91.0**	**2.74**
Joe Daley	Winnipeg Jets	62	3612	41	17	1	171	**5**	90.3	2.84
Wayne Rutledge	Houston Aeros	25	1456	14	10	0	77	1	90.1	3.17
Jack Norris	Phoenix Roadrunners	41	2412	21	14	4	128	1	89.1	3.18
Ernie Wakely	San Diego Mariners	67	3824	35	27	4	208	3	89.5	3.25

== All-Star game ==
The 4th annual WHA All-Star Game featured a Canadian-based All-Star team vs a United States-based All-Star team, with the game taking place in Richfield Coliseum in Cleveland, Ohio. The Canadians won the game 6–1, with Real Cloutier and Paul Shmyr being named MVPs.

== Avco World Trophy playoffs ==
For the only time, the World Hockey Association had ten teams compete in a postseason. New England played Cleveland in order to play Indianapolis while San Diego played Phoenix to play Houston. The team reverted to the 8-team format for next season. The fragmented scheduling led to Winnipeg, who beat Calgary in the Semifinals on May 2, having to wait 18 days to play Houston in the Avco Cup Final. It did not affect them, however, as they swept Houston in four games.

Quarterfinals; April 9-30
W1	Houston Aeros	4
W3	San Diego Mariners	2
E3	New England Whalers	4
E1	Indianapolis Racers	3
C3	Calgary Cowboys	4
C2	Quebec Nordiques	1
C1	Winnipeg Jets	4
C4	Edmonton Oilers	0
Preliminary Round
New England Whalers	3
Cleveland Crusaders	0

Semifinals; April 23 - May 16
W1	Houston Aeros	4
E3	New England Whalers	3
C1	Winnipeg Jets	4
C3	Calgary Cowboys	1
Preliminary Round
San Diego Mariners	3
Phoenix Roadrunners	2

Avco Cup; May 20-27
'
C1	Winnipeg Jets	4
W1	Houston Aeros	0

== AVCO World Trophy finals ==
(1) Winnipeg Jets VS. (1) Houston Aeros: Jets sweep series 4–0

- Game 1 (May 20) @ Houston: Winnipeg 4, Houston 3
- Game 2 (May 23) @ Houston: Winnipeg 5, Houston 4
- Game 3 (May 25) @ Winnipeg: Winnipeg 6, Houston 3
- Game 4 (May 27) @ Winnipeg: Winnipeg 9, Houston 1

== WHA awards ==
=== Trophies ===
Avco World Trophy:	Winnipeg Jets
Gordie Howe Trophy:	Marc Tardif
Bill Hunter Trophy:	Marc Tardif
Lou Kaplan Trophy:	Mark Napier
Ben Hatskin Trophy:	Michel Dion
Dennis A. Murphy Trophy:	Paul Shmyr
Paul Deneau Trophy:	Vaclav Nedomansky
Howard Baldwin Trophy:	Bobby Kromm
WHA Playoff MVP:	Ulf Nilsson

=== All-Star Team ===
Position	First Team	Second Team
Centre	Ulf Nilsson, Winnipeg	Robbie Ftorek, Phoenix
Right Wing	Anders Hedberg, Winnipeg	Real Cloutier, Quebec
Left Wing	Marc Tardif, Quebec	Bobby Hull, Winnipeg
Defence	Paul Shmyr, Cleveland	Kevin Morrison, San Diego
Defence	J. C. Tremblay, Quebec	Pat Stapleton, Indianapolis
Goaltender	Joe Daley, Winnipeg	Ron Grahame, Houston

== See also ==
- 1975 WHA Amateur Draft
- 1975 in sports
- 1976 in sports
