= 1975–76 Quebec Nordiques season =

World Hockey Association team season

1975–76 Quebec Nordiques
- Division: 2nd Canadian
- 1975–76 record: 50–27–4
- Home record: 33–7–0
- Road record: 17–20–4
- Goals for: 371
- Goals against: 316

Team information
- General manager: Maurice Filion
- Coach: Jean-Guy Gendron
- Captain: Michel Parizeau
- Arena: Colisée de Québec

Team leaders
- Goals: Marc Tardif (71)
- Assists: Marc Tardif and J. C. Tremblay (77)
- Points: Marc Tardif (148)
- Penalty minutes: Gord Gallant (297)
- Wins: Richard Brodeur (44)
- Goals against average: Richard Brodeur (3.69)

The 1975–76 Quebec Nordiques season was the Nordiques fourth season, as they were coming off their best season to date in 1974–75, earning 92 points and finishing on top of the Canadian Division in the regular season, and making it to the Avco Cup finals in the playoffs, where they were swept by the Houston Aeros.

Quebec would have a very strong start to the season, and would battle with the Winnipeg Jets all season long on top of the Canadian Division. Quebec would finish the season with a franchise record 50 wins and 104 points, but would finish behind the Jets, who tied the Houston Aeros with the most points in the league at 106. The Nordiques scored a league high 371 goals, and finished with a very impressive record of 33–7–0 at home, tying the Aeros for the best home record in the league.

Offensively, Quebec was led by Marc Tardif, who had the most goals and points in the league with 71 and 148 respectively, while his 77 assists tied teammate J. C. Tremblay for the most in the WHA. Tremblay would finish the year with 89 points, leading the Nordiques blueline. Real Cloutier had a breakout season, scoring 60 goals and earning 114 points, as did Chris Bordeleau, who had 37 goals and 109 points. Rejean Houle and Serge Bernier also finished with over 100 points, as they earned 103 and 102 respectively. Gord Gallant had a team high 297 penalty minutes, while Pierre Roy was not too far behind with 259.

In goal, Richard Brodeur shattered the Nordiques record for wins, earning 44, while he posted a 3.69 GAA and earned 2 shutouts in 69 games. Michel DeGuise backed him up, winning 6 games.

In the opening round of the playoffs, Quebec would face the Calgary Cowboys, who finished the season 3rd in the Canadian Division with 86 points, which was 18 fewer than the Nordiques. Calgary would quiet the Nordiques home crowd in the first game, beating Quebec 3–1, then the Cowboys would win the second game by a score of 8–4 to take a 2–0 series lead. Quebec would fall behind 3–0 in the series after Calgary took the third game by a 3–2 score. The Nordiques managed to squeak out a 4–3 win in the fourth game, however, Calgary would end the series with a 6–4 win at Le Colisée in the fifth game, ending the Nordiques season much sooner than anyone expected.

== Season standings ==
Canadian Division	GP	W	L	T	GF	GA	Pts
Winnipeg Jets	81	52	27	2	345	254	106
Quebec Nordiques	81	50	27	4	371	316	104
Calgary Cowboys	80	41	35	4	307	282	86
Edmonton Oilers	81	27	49	5	268	345	59
Toronto Toros	81	24	52	5	335	398	53

== Schedule and results ==
1975–76 regular season
October

Game	Date	Visitor	Score	Home	Record	Points
1	October 9	Winnipeg Jets	5–3	Quebec Nordiques	0–1–0	0
2	October 11	Toronto Toros	3–7	Quebec Nordiques	1–1–0	2
3	October 14	Edmonton Oilers	5–8	Quebec Nordiques	2–1–0	4
4	October 18	Houston Aeros	2–3	Quebec Nordiques	3–1–0	6
5	October 21	New England Whalers	1–6	Quebec Nordiques	4–1–0	8
6	October 25	Toronto Toros	2–3	Quebec Nordiques	5–1–0	10
7	October 28	Quebec Nordiques	2–5	Toronto Toros	5–2–0	10
8	October 29	Quebec Nordiques	2–4	New England Whalers	5–3–0	10
9	October 31	Quebec Nordiques	2–6	Cleveland Crusaders	5–4–0	10

November

Game	Date	Visitor	Score	Home	Record	Points
10	November 1	Quebec Nordiques	5–4	Indianapolis Racers	6–4–0	12
11	November 2	Quebec Nordiques	1–0	Winnipeg Jets	7–4–0	14
12	November 4	Quebec Nordiques	4–3	Edmonton Oilers	8–4–0	16
13	November 5	Quebec Nordiques	2–4	Calgary Cowboys	8–5–0	16
14	November 6	Quebec Nordiques	5–3	Denver Spurs	9–5–0	18
15	November 8	Indianapolis Racers	2–3	Quebec Nordiques	10–5–0	20
16	November 9	Phoenix Roadrunners	3–7	Quebec Nordiques	11–5–0	22
17	November 11	Minnesota Fighting Saints	6–8	Quebec Nordiques	12–5–0	24
18	November 15	Quebec Nordiques	3–1	New England Whalers	13–5–0	26
19	November 18	Cincinnati Stingers	4–6	Quebec Nordiques	14–5–0	28
20	November 20	Winnipeg Jets	3–2	Quebec Nordiques	14–6–0	28
21	November 22	Quebec Nordiques	9–6	Cincinnati Stingers	15–6–0	30
22	November 23	Quebec Nordiques	0–4	Houston Aeros	15–7–0	30
23	November 27	Quebec Nordiques	1–5	San Diego Mariners	15–8–0	30
24	November 29	Quebec Nordiques	4–4	Phoenix Roadrunners	15–8–1	31
25	November 30	Quebec Nordiques	2–1	Phoenix Roadrunners	16–8–1	33

December

Game	Date	Visitor	Score	Home	Record	Points
26	December 2	Cleveland Crusaders	2–9	Quebec Nordiques	17–8–1	35
27	December 5	Quebec Nordiques	4–7	Toronto Toros	17–9–1	35
28	December 7	Quebec Nordiques	3–2	Winnipeg Jets	18–9–1	37
29	December 9	Quebec Nordiques	1–4	Calgary Cowboys	18–10–1	37
30	December 10	Quebec Nordiques	4–7	Edmonton Oilers	18–11–1	37
31	December 12	Quebec Nordiques	4–6	Toronto Toros	18–12–1	37
32	December 13	Toronto Toros	3–6	Quebec Nordiques	19–12–1	39
33	December 16	Calgary Cowboys	3–7	Quebec Nordiques	20–12–1	41
34	December 18	Winnipeg Jets	4–5	Quebec Nordiques	21–12–1	43
35	December 20	Calgary Flames	7–8	Quebec Nordiques	22–12–1	45
36	December 21	Quebec Nordiques	7–11	Cincinnati Stingers	22–13–1	45
37	December 23	Quebec Nordiques	4–10	San Diego Mariners	22–14–1	45
38	December 27	Edmonton Oilers	3–6	Quebec Nordiques	23–14–1	47
39	December 28	Quebec Nordiques	6–1	Toronto Toros	24–14–1	49
40	December 30	Quebec Nordiques	4–4	Minnesota Fighting Saints	24–14–2	50

January

Game	Date	Visitor	Score	Home	Record	Points
41	January 2	Quebec Nordiques	4–5	Cleveland Crusaders	24–15–2	50
42	January 3	Phoenix Roadrunners	4–1	Quebec Nordiques	24–16–2	50
43	January 10	San Diego Mariners	3–4	Quebec Nordiques	25–16–2	52
44	January 15	Calgary Cowboys	3–5	Quebec Nordiques	26–16–2	54
45	January 17	Toronto Toros	3–4	Quebec Nordiques	27–16–2	56
46	January 21	Indianapolis Racers	2–3	Quebec Nordiques	28–16–2	58
47	January 25	Edmonton Oilers	6–7	Quebec Nordiques	29–16–2	60
48	January 27	Cincinnati Stingers	1–9	Quebec Nordiques	30–16–2	62
49	January 30	Quebec Nordiques	3–3	Toronto Toros	30–16–3	63
50	January 31	Toronto Toros	4–8	Quebec Nordiques	31–16–3	65

February

Game	Date	Visitor	Score	Home	Record	Points
51	February 3	Winnipeg Jets	4–5	Quebec Nordiques	32–16–3	67
52	February 5	Quebec Nordiques	2–4	Indianapolis Racers	32–17–3	67
53	February 7	Quebec Nordiques	4–4	Calgary Cowboys	32–17–4	68
54	February 8	Quebec Nordiques	5–4	Edmonton Oilers	33–17–4	70
55	February 11	Quebec Nordiques	6–4	Winnipeg Jets	34–17–4	72
56	February 12	Quebec Nordiques	4–6	Minnesota Fighting Saints	34–18–4	72
57	February 15	Quebec Nordiques	4–2	Houston Aeros	35–18–4	74
58	February 17	San Diego Mariners	2–5	Quebec Nordiques	36–18–4	76
59	February 22	New England Whalers	0–4	Quebec Nordiques	37–18–4	78
60	February 24	Houston Aeros	1–4	Quebec Nordiques	38–18–4	80
61	February 28	Winnipeg Jets	4–3	Quebec Nordiques	38–19–4	80

March

Game	Date	Visitor	Score	Home	Record	Points
62	March 2	Quebec Nordiques	2–5	Toronto Toros	38–20–4	80
63	March 4	Quebec Nordiques	1–4	Calgary Cowboys	38–21–4	80
64	March 5	Quebec Nordiques	5–4	Edmonton Oilers	39–21–4	82
65	March 7	Quebec Nordiques	2–4	Edmonton Oilers	39–22–4	82
66	March 9	Quebec Nordiques	4–7	Calgary Cowboys	39–23–4	82
67	March 10	Quebec Nordiques	3–10	Winnipeg Jets	39–24–4	82
68	March 12	Quebec Nordiques	10–8	Winnipeg Jets	40–24–4	84
69	March 14	Toronto Toros	3–1	Quebec Nordiques	40–25–4	84
70	March 16	New England Whalers	1–5	Quebec Nordiques	41–25–4	86
71	March 19	Quebec Nordiques	4–3	Toronto Toros	42–25–4	88
72	March 20	Calgary Cowboys	8–7	Quebec Nordiques	42–26–4	88
73	March 21	Quebec Nordiques	6–3	Edmonton Oilers	43–26–4	90
74	March 23	Cleveland Crusaders	3–1	Quebec Nordiques	43–27–4	90
75	March 25	Edmonton Oilers	5–7	Quebec Nordiques	44–27–4	92
76	March 27	Calgary Cowboys	4–6	Quebec Nordiques	45–27–4	94
77	March 30	Edmonton Oilers	3–8	Quebec Nordiques	46–27–4	96

April

Game	Date	Visitor	Score	Home	Record	Points
78	April 1	Edmonton Oilers	2–7	Quebec Nordiques	47–27–4	98
79	April 3	Toronto Toros	1–5	Quebec Nordiques	48–27–4	100
80	April 4	Quebec Nordiques	5–4	Toronto Toros	49–27–4	102
81	April 6	Toronto Toros	6–10	Quebec Nordiques	50–27–4	104

Legend: Win (2 points) Loss (0 points) Tie (1 point)

== Playoffs ==
1976 Avco Cup playoffs
Quarterfinals vs. (C3) Calgary Cowboys – Cowboys win 4–1

Game	Date	Visitor	Score	Home	Series
1	April 10	Calgary Cowboys	3–1	Quebec Nordiques	0–1
2	April 11	Calgary Cowboys	8–4	Quebec Nordiques	0–2
3	April 14	Quebec Nordiques	2–3	Calgary Cowboys	0–3
4	April 16	Quebec Nordiques	4–3	Calgary Cowboys	1–3
5	April 18	Calgary Cowboys	6–4	Quebec Nordiques	1–4

Legend: Win Loss

== Season stats ==
=== Scoring leaders ===
Player	GP	G	A	Pts	PIM
Marc Tardif	81	71	77	148	79
Real Cloutier	80	60	54	114	27
Chris Bordeleau	74	37	72	109	42
Rejean Houle	81	51	52	103	61
Serge Bernier	70	34	68	102	91

=== Goaltending ===
Player	GP	TOI	W	L	T	GA	SO	GAA	Save %
Richard Brodeur	69	3967	44	21	2	244	2	3.69	.890
Michel DeGuise	18	835	6	5	2	60	0	4.35	.870
Pete Donnelly	4	129	0	1	0	10	0	4.65	.846

== Playoff stats ==
=== Scoring leaders ===
Player	GP	G	A	Pts	PIM
Real Cloutier	5	4	5	9	0
Serge Bernier	5	2	6	8	6
Dale Hoganson	5	1	3	4	2
Steve Sutherland	5	2	1	3	17
Pierre Roy	5	1	2	3	29

=== Goaltending ===
Player	GP	TOI	W	L	GA	SO	GAA
Richard Brodeur	5	299	1	4	22	0	4.41

== Draft picks ==
Quebec's draft picks at the 1975 WHA Amateur Draft.

Round	#	Player	Nationality	College/Junior/Club team (League)
1	14	Pierre Mondou	Canada	Montreal Bleu Blanc Rouge (QMJHL)
2	29	Doug Halward	Canada	Peterborough Petes (OHA)
3	44	Pierre Giroux	Canada	Hull Festivals (QMJHL)
4	59	Ted Bulley	Canada	Hull Festivals (QMJHL)
5	73	Andre LePage	Canada	Montreal Bleu Blanc Rouge (QMJHL)
6	87	Jean Trottier	Canada	Laval National (QMJHL)
7	100	Mike Backman	Canada	Montreal Bleu Blanc Rouge (QMJHL)
8	112	Michel Brisebois	Canada	Sherbrooke Castors (QMJHL)
9	124	Michel Hamel	Canada	Laval National (QMJHL)
10	137	Florent Fortier	Canada	Quebec Remparts (QMJHL)
