= Ottawa Civics =

Former ice hockey team of the World Hockey Association

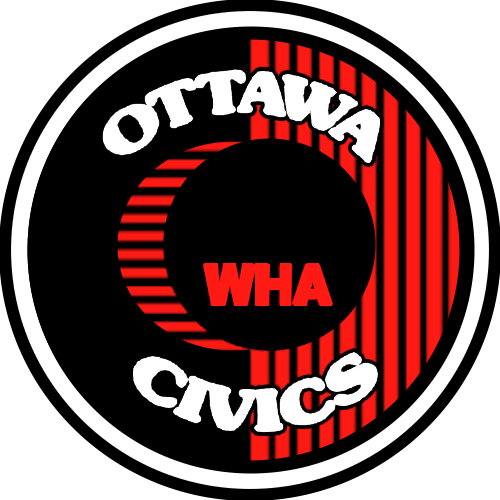
- City: Ottawa, Ontario
- League: WHA
- Founded: 1975
- Operated: 1976
- Home arena: Ottawa Civic Centre
- Colours: Red, black, white
- Owner: Ivan Mullenix
- Media: TVOntario; CKOY

Franchise history
- 1975–1976: Denver Spurs
- 1976: Ottawa Civics

The Ottawa Civics were a professional ice hockey team based out of Ottawa that played in the World Hockey Association. The team, which hastily adopted its identity in midseason when the Denver Spurs announced plans to sell the team and relocate to Ottawa, existed for approximately two weeks, folding after only seven games (two at home).

== Move to Ottawa ==
The Denver Spurs began play in the Western Hockey League in 1968, and had been modestly successful in the minors before moving to the WHA in 1975. However, fans in Denver had been expecting a National Hockey League team after Spurs owner Ivan Mullenix won a conditional NHL expansion franchise to begin play in 1976-77, only to see those plans fizzle out.

The Spurs were plagued by financial difficulties and poor attendance (fewer than 3,000 per game), widely attributed to the Denver fanbase rejecting the WHA as a major league. However, they were also dogged by rumours that the NHL was planning to move either the Kansas City Scouts or the league-owned California Golden Seals to Denver; the Scouts would indeed eventually move to Denver as the Colorado Rockies in the 1976 offseason. Mullenix knew that he could not possibly compete with an NHL team. The team unofficially folded in December when Mullenix wanted out, and the league stepped in to broker a deal with an Ottawa group called the Founders Club. In an unusual move, the Founders Club insisted that Mullenix move the Spurs to Ottawa immediately as a condition of beginning negotiations.

While the Spurs were on a road trip in January 1976, the team was quietly moved to Ottawa without even a press release and renamed the Civics. The players had heard talk a move out of Denver was imminent, but only learned of move at their next road game that night in Cincinnati, when they took the ice in their Denver jerseys, saw the name "Civics" on the scoreboard at Riverfront Coliseum, and heard O Canada being played before a game they believed was still between two American teams. They lost that night and again the following night in Houston, then knocked off the Minnesota Fighting Saints (another squad headed for oblivion before the season was over) in Minnesota, 5-2, on January 4. It would be the only victory in the Civics' short life. With the move to Ottawa, the league moved the team from the Western Division to the Canadian Division.

The Civics played two home games at the Ottawa Civic Centre in front of sellout crowds–against the New England Whalers on January 7, and against Gordie Howe's Aeros on January 15. However, the Founders Club was not willing to meet Mullenix' asking price for the team, and Mullenix was not interested in operating a team in Ottawa. After the first home game, he gave the Founders Club an ultimatum: come up with $1.5 million within 10 days, or he would fold the team. When the Founders Club only offered $1 million, the Civics folded on January 17, 1976 after only playing 7 games as Ottawa.

Because of the rushed nature of the move, the Civics did not adopt a logo or colours, and continued to wear the Spurs' orange road uniforms for all seven of their games including their two home games. However, the NHL's first foray in Colorado did not fare much better. An ownership group in Ottawa made a serious bid to move the Colorado Rockies to the Canadian capital, however the Rockies eventually moved to New Jersey and became the New Jersey Devils. Major league hockey returned to Ottawa when the reborn Senators joined the NHL as an expansion team in the 1992-93 season. The last active Spurs/Civics player in the NHL was Ron Delorme, who retired after the 1984-85 season.

The Spurs/Civics only played 41 games, making them easily the shortest-lived franchise in the WHA's seven-year history and one of the shortest-lived franchises in North American major league history. The Civics' 7-game, two-week existence made them easily the shortest-lived team in the WHA's seven-year history. Only the Tonawanda Kardex Lumbermen, who played only one week in the American Professional Football Association, forerunner of the National Football League, in 1921, are known to have a shorter existence.

== Season-by-season record ==
This listing includes 34 games played as the Denver Spurs. Note: GP = Games played, W = Wins, L = Losses, T = Ties, Pts = Points, GF = Goals for, GA = Goals against, PIM = Penalties in minutes

Season	GP	W	L	T	Pts	GF	GA	PIM	Finish	Playoffs
1975–76	41	14	26	1	29	134	172	535	5th, Canadian	Folded mid-season

== See also ==
- Ice hockey in Ottawa
- List of ice hockey teams in Ontario
- Ottawa Nationals
