= Gary Morrison =

American ice hockey player (born 1955)

- Born: November 8, 1955 (age 70) Farmington, Michigan, United States
- Height: 6 ft 2 in (188 cm)
- Weight: 200 lb (91 kg; 14 st 4 lb)
- Position: Right wing
- Shot: Right
- Played for: Philadelphia Flyers
- NHL draft: 90th overall, 1975; Philadelphia Flyers
- WHA draft: 107th overall, 1975; Phoenix Roadrunners
- Playing career: 1977–1982

Gary Lee Morrison (born November 8, 1955) is an American retired professional ice hockey player. He played 43 games in the National Hockey League (NHL) with the Philadelphia Flyers over parts of three seasons from 1980 to 1982.

== Personal life ==
Morrison met his wife Liza Pederson at the University of Michigan in 1973. They were both competing as athletes for the University of Michigan; Pederson as a swimmer and Morrison as a hockey player. After marrying in 1982 they had three children together.

== Career statistics ==
=== Regular season and playoffs ===
			Regular season					Playoffs
Season	Team	League	GP	G	A	Pts	PIM	GP	G	A	Pts	PIM
1973–74	University of Michigan	WCHA	15	7	0	7	25	—	—	—	—	—
1974–75	University of Michigan	WCHA	34	8	6	14	31	—	—	—	—	—
1975–76	University of Michigan	WCHA	25	5	5	10	27	—	—	—	—	—
1976–77	University of Michigan	WCHA	38	6	5	11	25	—	—	—	—	—
1977–78	Milwaukee Admirals	IHL	76	21	21	42	203	4	0	3	3	7
1978–79	Maine Mariners	AHL	62	14	15	29	73	10	0	8	8	35
1979–80	Philadelphia Flyers	NHL	3	0	2	2	0	5	0	1	1	2
1979–80	Maine Mariners	AHL	75	29	23	52	151	2	1	0	1	4
1980–81	Philadelphia Flyers	NHL	33	1	13	14	68	—	—	—	—	—
1980–81	Maine Mariners	AHL	34	9	6	15	53	17	4	5	9	80
1981–82	Philadelphia Flyers	NHL	7	0	0	0	2	—	—	—	—	—
1981–82	Maine Mariners	AHL	46	13	10	23	52	3	1	0	1	4
NHL totals			43	1	15	16	70	5	0	1	1	2
