= Blair MacKasey =

Canadian ice hockey player

- Born: December 13, 1955 (age 70) Hamilton, Ontario, Canada
- Height: 6 ft 2 in (188 cm)
- Weight: 185 lb (84 kg; 13 st 3 lb)
- Position: Defence
- Shot: Right
- Played for: Toronto Maple Leafs
- NHL draft: 55th overall, 1975; Washington Capitals
- WHA draft: 47th overall, 1975; Indianapolis Racers
- Playing career: 1975–1978

Blair David MacKasey (born December 13, 1955) is a Canadian former professional ice hockey defenceman. He played one game in the National Hockey League, with the Toronto Maple Leafs during the 1976–77 season, on October 5, 1976 against the Colorado Rockies. He was drafted in the fourth round, 55th overall, by the Washington Capitals in the 1975 NHL entry draft. He was also drafted by the Indianapolis Racers (fourth round, 47th overall) of the World Hockey Association in the 1975 WHA Amateur Draft. MacKasey was born in Hamilton, Ontario.

== Playing career ==
As a youth, he played in the 1967 Quebec International Pee-Wee Hockey Tournament with a minor ice hockey team from Verdun, Quebec.

MacKasey played one game in the National Hockey League, with the Toronto Maple Leafs during the 1976–77 season. He also played minor-league baseball for two seasons in the Montreal Expos organization.

== Post-playing career ==
After his playing career ended, MacKasey was head scout for the Phoenix Coyotes from 1996, and then head scout for Hockey Canada from June 2002 until July 2005, when he became Director of Player Personnel. From January 2006 to 2013 MacKasey held the position of Director of Professional Scouting for the Minnesota Wild, and then served as their Director of Player Personal from 2013 to 2018.

== Career statistics ==
=== Regular season and playoffs ===
			Regular season					Playoffs
Season	Team	League	GP	G	A	Pts	PIM	GP	G	A	Pts	PIM
1970–71	Montreal Junior Canadiens	OHA	57	1	5	6	38	—	—	—	—	—
1971–72	Montreal Junior Canadiens	OHA	59	2	25	27	85	—	—	—	—	—
1972–73	Montreal Bleu Blanc Rouge	QMJHL	52	1	23	24	108	4	0	1	1	2
1973–74	Montreal Bleu Blanc Rouge	QMJHL	60	13	41	54	70	9	1	4	5	12
1974–75	Montreal Bleu Blanc Rouge	QMJHL	62	12	40	52	100	9	2	8	10	6
1975–76	Richmond Robins	AHL	9	1	0	1	4	—	—	—	—	—
1975–76	Dayton Gems	IHL	50	6	21	27	69	12	1	2	3	9
1976–77	Toronto Maple Leafs	NHL	1	0	0	0	2	—	—	—	—	—
1976–77	Dallas Black Hawks	CHL	24	1	11	12	51	—	—	—	—	—
1977–78	Dallas Black Hawks	CHL	54	1	8	9	58	11	0	0	0	8
CHL totals			78	2	19	21	109	11	0	0	0	8
NHL totals			1	0	0	0	2	—	—	—	—	—

== See also ==
- List of players who played only one game in the NHL
