= Viktors Hatuļevs =

- Born: 17 February 1955 Riga, Latvian SSR, Soviet Union
- Died: 7 October 1994 (aged 39) Riga, Latvia
- Height: 6 ft 2 in (188 cm)
- Weight: 217 lb (98 kg; 15 st 7 lb)
- Position: Defence / Left Wing
- Shot: Left
- Played for: Dynamo Riga
- NHL draft: 160th overall, 1975; Philadelphia Flyers
- WHA draft: 116th overall, 1975; Cleveland Crusaders
- Playing career: 1974–1981
Medal record
Representing Soviet Union
Ice hockey
World Junior Championships
Gold medal – first place	1975 Canada and USA
Gold medal – first place	1974 Leningrad

Viktors Hatuļevs (Russian: Ви́ктор Ви́кторович Ха́тулев, Viktor Viktorovich Khatulev; 17 February 1955 – 7 October 1994) was a Soviet Latvian ice hockey defenseman and left winger who played for Dinamo Riga in the Soviet Hockey League. He was the first Soviet player drafted into the National Hockey League (NHL) Amateur Draft but never played for a North American team.

== Playing career ==
Hatuļevs played for Dinamo Riga in the 1970s. In Latvia, then a part of the USSR, ice hockey was the number one sport. Riga's Dinamo, under Viktor Tikhonov, rocketed into the big league and competed with Moscow teams as an equal.

Hatuļevs played in the first World Junior Championships in Leningrad and the second World Junior Championships in Winnipeg and Brandon, Manitoba. The two unofficial tournaments helped set the stage for the first official World Juniors in 1977. He was the best player in the World Youth Hockey Championship in 1974/75, and in 1973/74 he was the best goal scorer.

At the age of 20, Hatuļevs became the first Soviet-born and trained player ever drafted by an NHL team. The Philadelphia Flyers made the historic selection at the 1975 NHL Amateur Draft in the ninth round, 160th overall, even though there was no chance of getting him out of the USSR. Hatuļevs was also selected by the Cleveland Crusaders in the ninth round, 116th overall, of the 1975 WHA Amateur Draft.

But instead of being allowed to play in North America, he was banned for life in 1979 for hitting a referee during a fight with another player, though the ban was later lifted and he returned to hockey after one year.

Hatuļevs himself learned that he had been drafted only in 1978. He also played 6 games for Team USSR in 1977-1978 in the Izvestia Cup in Moscow.

He turned down an offer to move to Moscow and play for the USSR Central Red Army hockey club, instead preferring to remain in his native Latvia. (It should be mentioned that in Soviet times most of the best players were transferred to the Central Red Army club.)

In 1981 Hatuļevs was banned for life from the Soviet Hockey League.

== Banishment and death ==
After he was banned for life from the Soviet Hockey League in 1981, Hatuļevs became a taxi driver. He later worked in a warehouse and struggled with alcoholism.

Hatuļevs was found dead in the street in mysterious circumstances at age 39 on 7 October 1994.

== Awards ==
- World Junior Championships — Gold (1974) (Unofficial Tournament)
- World Junior Championships Points Leader (1974)
- World Junior Championships — Gold (1975) (Unofficial Tournament)
- World Junior Championships Best Forward (1975)
- World Junior Championships All-Star First Team (1975)

== Career statistics ==
GP = Games played; G = Goals; A = Assists; Pts = Points; PIM = Penalty minutes;

			Regular season					Playoffs
Season	Team	League	GP	G	A	Pts	PIM	GP	G	A	Pts	PIM
1973–74	Dynamo Riga	Soviet	18	7				—	—	—	—	—
1974–75	Dynamo Riga	Soviet	16	2				—	—	—	—	—
1975–76	Dynamo Riga	Soviet	27	6	5	11		—	—	—	—	—
1976–77	Dynamo Riga	Soviet	32	4	4	8		—	—	—	—	—
1977–78	Dynamo Riga	Soviet	29	7	12	19		—	—	—	—	—
1978–79	Dynamo Riga	Soviet	34	8	12	20	48	—	—	—	—	—
1979–80	Dynamo Riga	Soviet	19	3	6	9	12	—	—	—	—	—
1980–81	Dynamo Riga	Soviet	24	4	3	7	24	—	—	—	—	—
Soviet totals			199	33				—	—	—	—	—

=== Super Series statistics ===
The Super Series were exhibition games between an NHL team and Soviet teams (usually a club from the Soviet Championship League). Khatulev competed in one such series.

Year	Team	League	GP	G	A	Pts	PIM
1978-79	Krylia Sovetov	Soviet	4	2	0	2
