= Jamie Masters =

Canadian ice hockey player

- Born: April 14, 1955 (age 69); Toronto, Ontario, Canada
- Height: 6 ft 1 in (185 cm)
- Weight: 190 lb (86 kg; 13 st 8 lb)
- Position: Defence
- Shot: Right
- Played for: St. Louis Blues; Sportbund DJK Rosenheim; Villacher SV
- NHL draft: 36th overall, 1975; St. Louis Blues
- WHA draft: 12th overall, 1975; San Diego Mariners
- Playing career: 1975–1986

Jamie Masters (born April 14, 1955) is a Canadian former professional ice hockey player. He played 33 games in the National Hockey League with the St. Louis Blues over parts of three seasons from 1975 to 1978. The rest of his career, which lasted from 1975 to 1987, was spent in the minor leagues and then in Europe.

== Career statistics ==
=== Regular season and playoffs ===
| | | | Regular season | | | | | Playoffs |
| Season | Team | League | GP | G | A | Pts | PIM | GP | G | A | Pts | PIM |
|---|---|---|---|---|---|---|---|---|---|---|---|---|
| 1972–73 | Ottawa 67's | OHA | 59 | 9 | 19 | 28 | 44 | 9 | 1 | 4 | 5 | 10 |
| 1973–74 | Ottawa 67's | OHA | 61 | 6 | 29 | 35 | 28 | 6 | 1 | 0 | 1 | 14 |
| 1974–75 | Ottawa 67's | OMJHL | 69 | 26 | 69 | 95 | 80 | 7 | 0 | 8 | 8 | 14 |
| 1975–76 | St. Louis Blues | NHL | 7 | 0 | 0 | 0 | 0 | 1 | 0 | 0 | 0 | 0 |
| 1975–76 | Providence Reds | AHL | 62 | 7 | 27 | 34 | 86 | 1 | 1 | 0 | 1 | 2 |
| 1976–77 | St. Louis Blues | NHL | 16 | 1 | 7 | 8 | 2 | 1 | 0 | 0 | 0 | 0 |
| 1976–77 | Kansas City Blues | CHL | 58 | 7 | 21 | 28 | 46 | — | — | — | — | — |
| 1977–78 | Salt Lake Golden Eagles | CHL | 76 | 4 | 20 | 24 | 73 | 6 | 0 | 3 | 3 | 0 |
| 1978–79 | St. Louis Blues | NHL | 10 | 0 | 6 | 6 | 0 | — | — | — | — | — |
| 1978–79 | Salt Lake Golden Eagles | CHL | 62 | 2 | 24 | 26 | 98 | 10 | 0 | 1 | 1 | 13 |
| 1979–80 | Cincinnati Stingers | CHL | 33 | 9 | 13 | 22 | 24 | — | — | — | — | — |
| 1979–80 | Syracuse Firebirds | AHL | 46 | 6 | 17 | 23 | 26 | 4 | 0 | 3 | 3 | 0 |
| 1980–81 | Sportbund DJK Rosenheim | GER | 44 | 15 | 14 | 29 | 61 | 6 | 2 | 1 | 3 | 20 |
| 1981–82 | Sportbund DJK Rosenheim | GER | 44 | 11 | 29 | 40 | 51 | 7 | 1 | 7 | 8 | 4 |
| 1982–83 | Sportbund DJK Rosenheim | GER | 35 | 5 | 16 | 21 | 22 | — | — | — | — | — |
| 1983–84 | Sportbund DJK Rosenheim | GER | 46 | 29 | 24 | 53 | 38 | — | — | — | — | — |
| 1984–85 | Sportbund DJK Rosenheim | GER | 36 | 7 | 12 | 19 | 22 | 9 | 0 | 6 | 6 | 9 |
| 1985–86 | Villacher SV | AUT | 40 | 19 | 46 | 65 | 66 | — | — | — | — | — |
| 1986–87 | Villacher SV | AUT | 23 | 8 | 31 | 39 | 12 | — | — | — | — | — |
| GER totals | | | 205 | 67 | 95 | 162 | 194 | 22 | 3 | 14 | 17 | 33 |
| NHL totals | | | 33 | 1 | 13 | 14 | 2 | 2 | 0 | 0 | 0 | 0 |
