= Mario Viens =

Canadian ice hockey player

- Born: August 7, 1955 (age 70) Cornwall, Ontario, Canada
- Height: 5 ft 7 in (170 cm)
- Weight: 166 lb (75 kg; 11 st 12 lb)
- Position: Goaltender
- Played for: Toronto Toros
- NHL draft: 197th overall, 1975; Los Angeles Kings
- WHA draft: 70th overall, 1975; Toronto Toros
- Playing career: 1975–1977

Mario Viens (born August 7, 1955) is a Canadian former professional ice hockey goaltender. He won the Michel Brière Memorial Trophy as the Most Valuable Player in the Quebec Major Junior Hockey League for his outstanding play with the Cornwall Royals during the 1974–75 QMJHL season.

== Career statistics ==
=== Regular season and playoffs ===
			Regular season									Playoffs
Season	Team	League	GP	W	L	T	MIN	GA	SO	GAA	SV%	GP	W	L	MIN	GA	SO	GAA	SV%
1970–71	Cornwall Royals	QMJHL	—	—	—	—	—	3	0	9.00	.750	—	—	—	—	—	—	—	—
1972–73	Cornwall Royals	QMJHL	43	—	—	—	1530	164	0	3.73	—	16	—	—	—	—	—	—	—
1973–74	Cornwall Royals	QMJHL	36	—	—	—	—	172	2	4.83	—	5	—	—	—	—	—	—	—
1974–75	Cornwall Royals	QMJHL	71	—	—	—	4201	280	1	3.99	—	4	—	—	—	—	—	—	—
1975–76	Buffalo Norseman	NAHL	15	4	10	0	800	65	0	4.88	—	3	1	1	98	6	0	3.68
1975–76	Toronto Toros	WHA	26	4	14	3	1228	105	0	5.13	.873	—	—	—	—	—	—	—	—
1976–77	Maine Nordiques	NAHL	28	13	9	1	1452	102	1	4.21	.879	—	1	—	—	—	—	—	—
WHA totals			26	4	14	3	1228	105	0	5.13	.873	—	—	—	—	—	—	—	—
