= 1975 NHL amateur draft =

1975 North American ice hockey draft

General information
- Date: June 3, 1975
- Location: NHL offices Montreal, Quebec, Canada

Overview
- 217 total selections in 18 rounds
- First selection: (Canada) Mel Bridgman (Philadelphia Flyers)

The 1975 NHL amateur draft was the 13th draft for the National Hockey League. It was held at the NHL office in Montreal. The two-time defending Stanley Cup champion Philadelphia Flyers made the most noise at the draft, trading Bill Clement, Don McLean, and the 18th overall pick to the Washington Capitals for the number one overall selection, which they used to select Mel Bridgman. Later in round nine the Flyers became the first NHL team to select a Soviet-born and trained player in the amateur draft, selecting Latvian Viktor Khatulev with the 160th overall pick.

The last active player in the NHL from this draft class was Dave Taylor, who retired after the 1993–94 season.

== Selections by round ==
Below are listed the selections in the 1975 NHL amateur draft.

= NHL All-Star team ·	= NHL All-Star (Note: Players are identified as an All-Star if they were selected for the All-Star game at any time in their career.) ·	= NHL All-Star and NHL All-Star team ·

=== Round one ===
#	Player	Nationality	NHL team	College/junior/club team
1	Mel Bridgman (C)	Canada	Philadelphia Flyers (from Washington)^{1}	Victoria Cougars (WCHL)
2	Barry Dean (LW)	Canada	Kansas City Scouts	Medicine Hat Tigers (WCHL)
3	Ralph Klassen (F)	Canada	California Golden Seals	Saskatoon Blades (WCHL)
4	Bryan Maxwell (D)	Canada	Minnesota North Stars	Medicine Hat Tigers (WCHL)
5	Rick Lapointe (D)	Canada	Detroit Red Wings	Victoria Cougars (WCHL)
6	Don Ashby (C)	Canada	Toronto Maple Leafs	Calgary Centennials (WCHL)
7	Greg Vaydik (F)	Canada	Chicago Black Hawks	Medicine Hat Tigers (WCHL)
8	Richard Mulhern (D)	Canada	Atlanta Flames	Sherbrooke Castors (QMJHL)
9	Robin Sadler (D)	Canada	Montreal Canadiens (from St. Louis)^{2}	Edmonton Oil Kings (WCHL)
10	Rick Blight (RW)	Canada	Vancouver Canucks	Brandon Wheat Kings (WCHL)
11	Pat Price (D)	Canada	New York Islanders	Vancouver Blazers (WHA)
12	Wayne Dillon (C)	Canada	New York Rangers	Toronto Toros (WHA)
13	Gordon Laxton (G)	Canada	Pittsburgh Penguins	New Westminster Bruins (WCHL)
14	Doug Halward (D)	Canada	Boston Bruins	Peterborough Petes (OMJHL)
15	Pierre Mondou (F)	Canada	Montreal Canadiens (from Los Angeles)^{3}	Montreal Bleu Blanc Rouge (QMJHL)
16	Tim Young (F)	Canada	Los Angeles Kings (from Montreal)^{4}	Ottawa 67's (OMJHL)
17	Bob Sauve (G)	Canada	Buffalo Sabres	Laval National (QMJHL)
18	Alex Forsyth (F)	Canada	Washington Capitals (from Philadelphia)^{5}	Kingston Canadians (OMJHL)

1. The Washington Capitals' first-round pick went to the Philadelphia Flyers as the result of a trade on June 3, 1975 that sent Bill Clement, Don McLean and Philadelphia's first-round pick in 1975 to Washington in exchange for this pick.
2. The St. Louis Blues' first-round pick went to the Montreal Canadiens as the result of a trade on May 15, 1973 that sent Montreal's first-round pick and third-round pick in 1973 to St. Louis in exchange for St. Louis' first-round pick and fourth-round pick in 1973 and this pick.
3. The Los Angeles Kings' first-round pick went to the Montreal Canadiens as the result of a trade on November 4, 1971 that sent Denis DeJordy, Dale Hoganson, Noel Price and Doug Robinson to Montreal in exchange for Rogatien Vachon and Montreal's option to swap 1975 1st round picks with Los Angeles.
4. The Montreal Canadiens' first-round pick went to the Los Angeles Kings as the result of a trade on November 4, 1971 that sent Denis DeJordy, Dale Hoganson, Noel Price and Doug Robinson to Montreal in exchange for Rogatien Vachon and Montreal's option to swap 1975 1st round picks with Los Angeles.
5. The Philadelphia Flyers' first-round pick went to the Washington Capitals as the result of a trade on June 3, 1975 that sent Washington's first-round pick in 1975 NHL Amateur Draft in exchange for Bill Clement, Don McLean and this pick.

=== Round two ===
#	Player	Nationality	NHL team	College/junior/club team
19	Peter Scamurra (D)	United States	Washington Capitals	Peterborough Petes (OMJHL)
20	Don Cairns (LW)	Canada	Kansas City Scouts	Victoria Cougars (WCHL)
21	Dennis Maruk (C)	Canada	California Golden Seals	London Knights (OMJHL)
22	Brian Engblom (D)	Canada	Montreal Canadiens (from Minnesota)^{1}	University of Wisconsin (WCHA)
23	Jerry Rollins (D)	Canada	Detroit Red Wings	Winnipeg Clubs (WCHL)
24	Doug Jarvis (C)	Canada	Toronto Maple Leafs	Peterborough Petes (OMJHL)
25	Danny Arndt (LW)	Canada	Chicago Black Hawks	Saskatoon Blades (WCHL)
26	Rick Bowness (RW)	Canada	Atlanta Flames	Montreal Blue Blanc Rouge (QMJHL)
27	Ed Staniowski (G)	Canada	St. Louis Blues	Regina Pats (WCHL)
28	Brad Gassoff (LW)	Canada	Vancouver Canucks	Kamloops Chiefs (WCHL)
29	Dave Salvian (LW)	Canada	New York Islanders	St. Catharines Black Hawks (OMJHL)
30	Doug Soetaert (G)	Canada	New York Rangers	Edmonton Oil Kings (WCHL)
31	Russ Anderson (D)	United States	Pittsburgh Penguins	University of Minnesota (WCHA)
32	Barry Smith (C)	Canada	Boston Bruins	New Westminster Bruins (WCHL)
33	Terry Bucyk (RW)	Canada	Los Angeles Kings	Lethbridge Broncos (WCHL)
34	Kelly Greenbank (RW)	Canada	Montreal Canadiens	Winnipeg Clubs (WCHL)
35	Ken Breitenbach (D)	Canada	Buffalo Sabres	St. Catharines Black Hawks (OMJHL)
36	Jamie Masters (D)	Canada	St. Louis Blues (from Philadelphia)^{2}	Ottawa 67's (OMJHL)

1. The Minnesota North Stars' second-round pick went to the Montreal Canadiens as the result of a trade on May 15, 1973 that sent Montreal's second-round pick in 1973 NHL amateur draft to Minnesota in exchange for this pick.
2. The Philadelphia Flyers' second-round pick went to the St. Louis Blues as the result of a trade on September 16, 1974 that sent Wayne Stephenson to Philadelphia in exchange for the rights to Randy Andreachuk and this pick.

=== Round three ===
#	Player	Nationality	NHL team	College/junior/club team
37	Al Cameron (D)	Canada	Detroit Red Wings (from Washington)^{1}	New Westminster Bruins (WCHL)
38	Neil Lyseng (RW)	Canada	Kansas City Scouts	Kamloops Chiefs (WCHL)
39	John Tweedle (C)	Canada	California Golden Seals	Lake Superior State University (CCHA)
40	Paul Harrison (G)	Canada	Minnesota North Stars	Oshawa Generals (OMJHL)
41	Alex Pirus (RW)	Canada	Minnesota North Stars (from Detroit)^{2}	University of Notre Dame (WCHA)
42	Bruce Boudreau (C)	Canada	Toronto Maple Leafs	Toronto Marlboros (OMJHL)
43	Mike O'Connell (D)	United States	Chicago Black Hawks	Kingston Canadians (OMJHL)
44	Terry Martin (LW)	Canada	Buffalo Sabres (from Atlanta)^{3}	London Knights (OMJHL)
45	Blair Davidson (D)	Canada	Detroit Red Wings (from St. Louis)^{4}	Flin Flon Bombers (WCHL)
46	Norm LaPointe (G)	Canada	Vancouver Canucks	Trois-Rivières Draveurs (QMJHL)
47	Joe Fortunato (LW)	Canada	New York Islanders	Kitchener Rangers (OMJHL)
48	Greg Hickey (LW)	Canada	New York Rangers	Hamilton Fincups (OMJHL)
49	Paul Baxter (D)	Canada	Pittsburgh Penguins	Cleveland Crusaders (WHA)
50	Clark Hamilton (LW)	Canada	Detroit Red Wings (from Boston)^{5}	University of Notre Dame (WCHA)
51	Paul Woods (C)	Canada	Montreal Canadiens (from Los Angeles)^{6}	Sault Ste. Marie Greyhounds (OMJHL)
52	Pat Hughes (RW)	Canada	Montreal Canadiens	University of Michigan (WCHA)
53	Gary McAdam (RW)	Canada	Buffalo Sabres	St. Catharines Black Hawks (OMJHL)
54	Bob Ritchie (LW)	Canada	Philadelphia Flyers	Sorel Eperviers (QMJHL)

1. The Washington Capitals' third-round pick went to the Detroit Red Wings as the result of a trade on February 28, 1975 that sent Nelson Pyatt to Washington's in exchange for this pick.
2. The Detroit Red Wings' third-round pick went to the Minnesota North Stars as the result of a trade on October 1, 1974 that sent Gary Bergman to Detroit in exchange for this pick.
3. The Atlanta Flames' third-round pick went to the Buffalo Sabres as the result of a trade on May 21, 1974 that sent the rights to Jim McMasters to Atlanta in exchange for this pick.
4. The St. Louis Blues' third-round pick went to the Detroit Red Wings as the result of a trade on December 30, 1974 that sent Red Berenson St. Louis in exchange for Phil Roberto and this pick.
5. The Boston Bruins' third-round pick went to the Detroit Red Wings as the result of a trade on February 18, 1975 that sent Earl Anderson and Hank Nowak to Boston in exchange for Walt McKechnie and this pick.
6. The Los Angeles Kings' third-round pick went to the Montreal Canadiens as the result of a trade on August 22, 1972 that sent Terry Harper to Los Angeles in exchange for Los Angeles' second-round pick in 1974 NHL amateur draft, first-round pick in 1976 NHL amateur draft and this pick.

=== Round four ===
#	Player	Nationality	NHL team	College/junior/club team
55	Blair MacKasey (D)	Canada	Washington Capitals	Montreal Bleu Blanc Rouge (QMJHL)
56	Ron Delorme (C)	Canada	Kansas City Scouts	Lethbridge Broncos (WCHL)
57	Greg Smith (D)	Canada	California Golden Seals	Colorado College (WCHA)
58	Steve Jensen (LW)	United States	Minnesota North Stars	Michigan Technological University (WCHA)
59	Mike Wirachowsky (D)	Canada	Detroit Red Wings	Regina Pats (WCHL)
60	Rick Adduono (C)	Canada	Boston Bruins (from Toronto)^{1}	St. Catharines Black Hawks (OMJHL)
61	Pierre Giroux (C)	Canada	Chicago Black Hawks	Hull Festivals (QMJHL)
62	Dale Ross (C)	Canada	Atlanta Flames	Ottawa 67's (OMJHL)
63	Rick Bourbonnais (RW)	Canada	St. Louis Blues	Ottawa 67's (OMJHL)
64	Glen Richardson (LW)	Canada	Vancouver Canucks	Hamilton Fincups (OMJHL)
65	Andre Lepage (G)	Canada	New York Islanders	Montreal Bleu Blanc Rouge (QMJHL)
66	Bill Cheropita (G)	Canada	New York Rangers	St. Catharines Black Hawks (OMJHL)
67	Stu Younger (LW)	Canada	Pittsburgh Penguins	Michigan Technological University (WCHA)
68	Denis Daigle (LW)	Canada	Boston Bruins	Montreal Bleu Blanc Rouge (QMJHL)
69	Andre Leduc (D)	Canada	Los Angeles Kings	Sherbrooke Castors (QMJHL)
70	Dave Gorman (RW)	Canada	Montreal Canadiens	Phoenix Roadrunners (WHA)
71	Greg Neeld (RW)	Canada	Buffalo Sabres	Calgary Centennials (WCHL)
72	Rick St. Croix (G)	Canada	Philadelphia Flyers	Oshawa Generals (OMJHL)

1. The Toronto Maple Leafs' fourth-round pick went to the Boston Bruins as the result of a trade on June 3, 1975 that sent Boston's third-round pick in 1976 NHL amateur draft to Toronto in exchange for this pick.

=== Round five ===
#	Player	Nationality	NHL team	College/junior/club team
73	Craig Crawford (RW)	Canada	Washington Capitals	Toronto Marlboros (OMJHL)
74	Terry McDonald (D)	Canada	Kansas City Scouts	Kamloops Chiefs (WCHL)
75	Doug Young (D)	Canada	California Golden Seals	Michigan Technological University (WCHA)
76	Dave Norris (LW)	Canada	Minnesota North Stars	Hamilton Fincups (OMJHL)
77	Mike Wong (C)	United States	Detroit Red Wings	Montreal Bleu Blanc Rouge (QMJHL)
78	Ted Long (D)	Canada	Toronto Maple Leafs	Hamilton Fincups (OMJHL)
79	Bob Hoffmeyer (D)	Canada	Chicago Black Hawks	Saskatoon Blades (WCHL)
80	Willi Plett (RW)	Canada	Atlanta Flames	St. Catharines Black Hawks (OMJHL)
81	Jim Gustafson (C)	Canada	St. Louis Blues	Victoria Cougars (WCHL)
82	Doug Murray (LW)	Canada	Vancouver Canucks	Brandon Wheat Kings (WCHL)
83	Denny McLean (LW)	Canada	New York Islanders	Calgary Centennials (WCHL)
84	Larry Huras (D)	Canada	New York Rangers	Kitchener Rangers (OMJHL)
85	Kim Clackson (D)	Canada	Pittsburgh Penguins	Victoria Cougars (WCHL)
86	Stan Jonathan (LW)	Canada	Boston Bruins	Peterborough Petes (OMJHL)
87	Dave Miglia (D)	Canada	Los Angeles Kings	Trois-Rivières Draveurs (QMJHL)
88	Jim Turkiewicz (D)	Canada	Montreal Canadiens	Toronto Marlboros (WHA)
89	Don Edwards (G)	Canada	Buffalo Sabres	Kitchener Rangers (OMJHL)
90	Gary Morrison (RW)	United States	Philadelphia Flyers	University of Michigan (WCHA)

=== Round six ===
#	Player	Nationality	NHL team	College/junior/club team
91	Roger Swanson (G)	Canada	Washington Capitals	Flin Flon Bombers (WCHL)
92	Eric Sanderson (LW)	Canada	Kansas City Scouts	Victoria Cougars (WCHL)
93	Larry Hendrick (G)	Canada	California Golden Seals	Calgary Centennials (WCHL)
94	Greg Clause (RW)	Canada	Minnesota North Stars	Hamilton Fincups (OMJHL)
95	Mike Harazny (D)	Canada	Detroit Red Wings	Regina Pats (WCHL)
96	Kevin Campbell (D)	Canada	Toronto Maple Leafs	St. Lawrence University (ECAC)
97	Tom Ulseth (RW)	United States	Chicago Black Hawks	University of Wisconsin (WCHA)
98	Paul Heaver (D)	Canada	Atlanta Flames	Oshawa Generals (OMJHL)
99	Jack Brownschidle (D)	United States	St. Louis Blues	University of Notre Dame (WCHA)
100	Bob Watson (RW)	Canada	Vancouver Canucks	Flin Flon Bombers (WCHL)
101	Mike Sleep (RW)	Canada	New York Islanders	New Westminster Bruins (WCHL)
102	Randy Koch (LW)	United States	New York Rangers	University of Vermont (ECAC)
103	Peter Morris (LW)	Canada	Pittsburgh Penguins	Victoria Cougars (WCHL)
104	Matti Hagman (C)	Finland	Boston Bruins	HIFK (Finland)
105	Bob Russell (C)	Canada	Los Angeles Kings	Sudbury Wolves (OMJHL)
106	Michel Lachance (D)	Canada	Montreal Canadiens	Montreal Bleu Blanc Rouge (QMJHL)
107	Jim Minor (LW)	Canada	Buffalo Sabres	Regina Pats (WCHL)
108	Paul Holmgren (RW)	United States	Philadelphia Flyers	University of Minnesota (WCHA)

=== Round seven ===
#	Player	Nationality	NHL team	College/junior/club team
109	Clark Jantzie (LW)	Canada	Washington Capitals	University of Alberta (CIAU)
110	Bill Oleschuk (G)	Canada	Kansas City Scouts	Saskatoon Blades (WCHL)
111	Rick Shinske (C)	Canada	California Golden Seals	New Westminster Bruins (WCHL)
112	Francois Robert (D)	Canada	Minnesota North Stars	Sherbrooke Castors (QMJHL)
113	Jean-Luc Phaneuf (C)	Canada	Detroit Red Wings	Montreal Bleu Blanc Rouge (QMJHL)
114	Mario Rouillard (RW)	Canada	Toronto Maple Leafs	Trois-Rivières Draveurs (QMJHL)
115	Ted Bulley (LW)	Canada	Chicago Black Hawks	Hull Festivals (QMJHL)
116	Dale McMullin (LW)	Canada	Atlanta Flames	Brandon Wheat Kings (WCHL)
117	Doug Lindskog (LW)	Canada	St. Louis Blues	University of Michigan (WCHA)
118	Brian Shmyr (C)	Canada	Vancouver Canucks	New Westminster Bruins (WCHL)
119	Richie Hansen (C)	United States	New York Islanders	Sudbury Wolves (OMJHL)
120	Claude Larose (LW)	Canada	New York Rangers	Sherbrooke Castors (QMJHL)
121	Mike Will (C)	Canada	Pittsburgh Penguins	Edmonton Oil Kings (WCHL)
122	Gary Carr (G)	Canada	Boston Bruins	Toronto Marlboros (OMJHL)
123	Dave Faulkner (C)	Canada	Los Angeles Kings	Regina Pats (WCHL)
124	Tim Burke (D)	United States	Montreal Canadiens	University of New Hampshire (ECAC)
125	Grant Rowe (D)	Canada	Buffalo Sabres	Ottawa 67's (OMJHL)
126	Dana Decker (LW)	United States	Philadelphia Flyers	Michigan Technological University (WCHA)

=== Round eight ===
#	Player	Nationality	NHL team	College/junior/club team
127	Mike Fryia (LW)	Canada	Washington Capitals	Peterborough Petes (OMJHL)
128	Joe Baker (D)	United States	Kansas City Scouts	University of Minnesota (WCHA)
129	Doug Schoenfeld (D)	Canada	California Golden Seals	Cambridge Hornets (OSAHA)
130	Dean Magee (LW)	Canada	Minnesota North Stars	Colorado College (WCHA)
131	Steve Carlson (C)	United States	Detroit Red Wings	Johnstown Jets (NAHL)
132	Ron Wilson (D)	United States/ Canada	Toronto Maple Leafs	Providence College (ECAC)
133	Paul Jensen (D)	United States	Chicago Black Hawks	Michigan Technological University (WCHA)
134	Rick Piche (D)	Canada	Atlanta Flames	Brandon Wheat Kings (WCHL)
135	Dick Lamby (D)	United States	St. Louis Blues	Salem State University (ECAC)
136	Allan Fleck (LW)	Canada	Vancouver Canucks	New Westminster Bruins (WCHL)
137	Bob Sunderland (D)	United States	New York Islanders	Boston University (ECAC)
138	Bill Hamilton (C)	Canada	New York Rangers	St. Catharines Black Hawks (OMJHL)
139	Tapio Levo (D)	Finland	Pittsburgh Penguins	Ässät (Finland)
140	Bo Berglund (LW)	Sweden	Boston Bruins	Modo AIK (Sweden)
141	Bill Reber (RW)	United States	Los Angeles Kings	University of Vermont (ECAC)
142	Craig Norwich (D)	United States	Montreal Canadiens	University of Wisconsin (WCHA)
143	Alec Tidey (RW)	Canada	Buffalo Sabres	Lethbridge Broncos (WCHL)

=== Round nine ===
#	Player	Nationality	NHL team	College/junior/club team
144	Jim Ofrim (C)	Canada	Washington Capitals	University of Alberta (CIAU)
145	Scott Williams (LW)	Canada	Kansas City Scouts	Flin Flon Bombers (WCHL)
146	Jim Weaver (G)	Canada	California Golden Seals	Kingston Canadians (OMJHL)
147	Terry Angel (RW)	Canada	Minnesota North Stars	Oshawa Generals (OMJHL)
148	Gary Vaughan (RW)	Canada	Detroit Red Wings	Medicine Hat Tigers (WCHL)
149	Paul Evans (LW)	Canada	Toronto Maple Leafs	Peterborough Petes(OMJHL)
150	Nick Sanza (G)	Canada	Atlanta Flames	Sherbrooke Castors (QMJHL)
151	David McNab (G)	Canada/ United States	St. Louis Blues	University of Wisconsin (WCHA)
152	Bob McNeice (D)	Canada	Vancouver Canucks	New Westminster Bruins (WCHL)
153	Dan Blair (RW)	Canada	New York Islanders	Ottawa 67's (OMJHL)
154	Bud Stefanski (C)	Canada	New York Rangers	Oshawa 67's (OMJHL)
155	Byron Shutt (LW)	Canada	Pittsburgh Penguins	Bowling Green University (CCHA)
156	Joe Rando (D)	United States	Boston Bruins	University of New Hampshire (ECAC)
157	Sean Sullivan (D)	Canada	Los Angeles Kings	Hamilton Fincups (OMJHL)
158	Paul Clarke (D)	Canada	Montreal Canadiens	University of Notre Dame (WCHA)
159	Andy Whitby (RW)	Canada	Buffalo Sabres	Oshawa Generals (OMJHL)
160	Viktors Hatulevs (LW)	Soviet Union	Philadelphia Flyers	Riga Dynamo (USSR)

=== Round ten ===
#	Player	Nationality	NHL team	College/junior/club team
161	Mal Zinger (RW)	Canada	Washington Capitals	Kamloops Chiefs (WCHL)
162	Greg Agar (RW)	Canada	California Golden Seals	Merritt Centennials (BCJHL)
163	Michel Blais (D)	Canada	Minnesota North Stars	Kingston Canadians (OMJHL)
164	Jean Thibodeau (C)	Canada	Detroit Red Wings	Shawinigan Dynamos (QMJHL)
165	Jean Latendresse (D)	Canada	Toronto Maple Leafs	Shawinigan Dynamos (QMJHL)
166	Paul Crowley (RW)	Canada	Toronto Maple Leafs (from Chicago)^{1}	Sudbury Wolves (OMJHL)
167	Brian O'Connell (G)	Canada	Atlanta Flames	Saint Louis University (CCHA)
168	Joey Girardin (D)	Canada	New York Islanders	Winnipeg Clubs (WCHL)
169	Daniel Beaulieu (LW)	Canada	New York Rangers	Quebec Remparts (QMJHL)
170	Frank Salive (G)	Canada	Pittsburgh Penguins	Peterborough Petes (OMJHL)
171	Kevin Nugent (RW)	United States	Boston Bruins	University of Notre Dame (WCHA)
172	Brian Petrovek (G)	United States	Los Angeles Kings	Harvard University (ECAC)
173	Bob Ferriter (C)	United States	Montreal Canadiens	Boston College (ECAC)
174	Len Moher (G)	United States	Buffalo Sabres	University of Notre Dame (WCHA)
175	Duffy Smith (D)	Canada	Philadelphia Flyers	Bowling Green University (CCHA)

1. The Chicago Black Hawks' tenth-round pick went to the Toronto Maple Leafs as the result of a trade on June 3, 1975 that sent cash to Chicago in exchange for this pick.

=== Round eleven ===
#	Player	Nationality	NHL team	College/junior/club team
176	Dave Hanson (D)	United States	Detroit Red Wings (from Washington)^{1}	Colorado College (WCHA)
177	Earl Sargent (RW)	United States	Minnesota North Stars	Fargo Sugar Kings (MWJHL)
178	Rob Larson (D)	United States	Detroit Red Wings	University of Minnesota (WCHA)
179	Dan D'Alvise (C)	Canada	Toronto Maple Leafs	Royal York Rangers (OPJHL)
180	Jack Laine (RW)	Canada	Toronto Maple Leafs (from Chicago)^{2}	Bowling Green University (CCHA)
181	Joe Augustine (D)	United States	Atlanta Flames	Austin Mavericks (MWJHL)
182	Sidney Veysey (C)	Canada	Vancouver Canucks	Sherbrooke Castors (QMJHL)
183	Geoff Green (RW)	Canada	New York Islanders	Sudbury Wolves (OMJHL)
184	John McMorrow (C)	United States	New York Rangers	Providence College (ECAC)
185	John Glynne (D)	United States	Pittsburgh Penguins	University of Vermont (ECAC)
186	Tom Goddard (RW)	United States	Los Angeles Kings	University of North Dakota (WCHA)
187	Dave Bell (C)	Canada	Montreal Canadiens	Harvard University (ECAC)

1. The Washington Capitals' eleventh-round pick went to the Detroit Red Wings as the result of a trade on June 3, 1975 that sent cash to Washington in exchange for this pick.
2. The Chicago Black Hawks' eleventh-round pick went to the Toronto Maple Leafs as the result of a trade on June 3, 1975 that sent cash to Chicago in exchange for this pick.

=== Round twelve ===
#	Player	Nationality	NHL team	College/junior/club team
188	Ken Holland (G)	Canada	Toronto Maple Leafs (from Washington)^{1}	Medicine Hat Tigers (WCHL)
189	Bob Barnes (D)	Canada	Toronto Maple Leafs (from Kansas City)^{2}	Hamilton Fincups (OMJHL)
190	Gilles Cloutier (G)	Canada	Minnesota North Stars	Shawinigan Dynamos (QMJHL)
191	Gary Burns (LW)	United States	Toronto Maple Leafs	University of New Hampshire (ECAC)
192	Torbjorn Nilsson (RW)	Sweden	Atlanta Flames	Skelleftea (Sweden)
193	Jim Montgomery (C)	Canada	Toronto Maple Leafs (from St. Louis)^{3}	Hull Festivals (QMJHL)
194	Kari Makkonen (RW)	Finland	New York Islanders	Pori (Finland)
195	Tom McNamara (G)	United States	New York Rangers	University ofVermont (ECAC)
196	Lex Hudson (D)	Canada	Pittsburgh Penguins	University of Denver (WCHA)
197	Mario Viens (G)	Canada	Los Angeles Kings	Cornwall Royals (QMJHL)
198	Carl Jackson (G)	Canada	Montreal Canadiens	University of Pennsylvania (ECAC)

1. The Washington Capitals' twelfth-round pick went to the Toronto Maple Leafs as the result of a trade on June 3, 1975 that sent cash to Washington in exchange for this pick.
2. The Kansas City Scouts' twelfth-round pick went to the Toronto Maple Leafs as the result of a trade on June 3, 1975 that sent cash to Kansas City in exchange for this pick.
3. The St. Louis Blues' twelfth-round pick went to the Toronto Maple Leafs as the result of a trade on June 3, 1975 that sent cash to St. Louis in exchange for this pick.

=== Round thirteen ===
#	Player	Nationality	NHL team	College/junior/club team
199	Rick Martin (RW)	Canada	Toronto Maple Leafs	London Knights (OMJHL)
200	Steve Roberts (D)	United States	New York Rangers (from St. Louis)^{1}	Providence College (ECAC)
201	Paul Dionne (D)	Canada	New York Rangers	Princeton University (ECAC)
202	Dan Tsubouchi (RW)	Canada	Pittsburgh Penguins	Saint Louis University (CCHA)
203	Chuck Carpenter (C)	United States	Los Angeles Kings	Yale University (ECAC)
204	Michel Brisebois (C)	Canada	Montreal Canadiens	Sherbrooke Castors (QMJHL)

1. The St. Louis Blues' thirteenth-round pick went to the New York Rangers as the result of a trade on June 3, 1975 that sent cash to St. Louis in exchange for this pick.

=== Round fourteen ===
#	Player	Nationality	NHL team	College/junior/club team
205	Cecil Luckern (LW)	United States	New York Rangers	University of New Hampshire (ECAC)
206	Brano Stankovsky (LW)	United States	Pittsburgh Penguins	Fargo Sugar Kings (MWJHL)
207	Bob Fish (LW)	United States	Los Angeles Kings	Fargo Sugar Kings (MWJHL)
208	Roger Bourque (D)	Canada	Montreal Canadiens	University of Notre Dame (WCHA)

=== Round fifteen ===
#	Player	Nationality	NHL team	College/junior/club team
209	John Corriveau (RW)	United States	New York Rangers	University of New Hampshire (ECAC)
210	Dave Taylor (RW)	Canada	Los Angeles Kings	Clarkson University (ECAC)
211	Jim Lundquist (D)	United States	Montreal Canadiens	Brown University (ECAC)

=== Round sixteen ===
#	Player	Nationality	NHL team	College/junior/club team
212	Tom Funke (LW)	United States	New York Rangers	Fargo Sugar Kings (MWJHL)
213	Bob Shaw (D)	Canada	Los Angeles Kings	Clarkson University (ECAC)
214	Don Madson (C)	United States	Montreal Canadiens	Fargo Sugar Kings (MWJHL)

=== Round seventeen ===
#	Player	Nationality	NHL team	College/junior/club team
215	Bob Bain (D)	Canada	Montreal Canadiens	University of New Hampshire (ECAC)

=== Round eighteen ===
#	Player	Nationality	NHL team	College/junior/club team
216	Gary Gill (LW)	Canada	Atlanta Flames	Sault Ste. Marie Greyhounds (OMJHL)
217	Kelly Secord (RW)	Canada	Pittsburgh Penguins	New Westminster Bruins (WCHL)

= NHL All-Star team ·	= NHL All-Star ·	= NHL All-Star and NHL All-Star team ·

== Draftees based on nationality ==
Rank	Country	Amount
	North America	212
1	Canada	167
2	United States	45
	Europe	5
3	Finland	3
4	Sweden	2
5	Soviet Union	1

== See also ==
- 1975–76 NHL season
- 1975 WHA amateur draft
- List of NHL players
