= Dave Salvian =

Canadian ice hockey player (born 1955)

- Born: September 9, 1955 (age 69); Toronto, Ontario, Canada
- Height: 5 ft 10 in (178 cm)
- Weight: 170 lb (77 kg; 12 st 2 lb)
- Position: Right wing
- Shot: Left
- Played for: New York Islanders
- NHL draft: 29th overall, 1975; New York Islanders
- WHA draft: 60th overall, 1975; Houston Aeros
- Playing career: 1975–1980

David Clifford Salvian (born September 9, 1955) is a Canadian retired professional ice hockey right winger who played in one National Hockey League playoff game for the New York Islanders during the 1976–77 NHL season, a playoff game on April 7, 1977 against the Chicago Black Hawks.

== Career statistics ==
=== Regular season and playoffs ===
			Regular season					Playoffs
Season	Team	League	GP	G	A	Pts	PIM	GP	G	A	Pts	PIM
1972–73	St. Catharines Black Hawks	OHA	51	12	12	24	66	—	—	—	—	—
1973–74	St. Catharines Black Hawks	OHA	66	36	61	97	113	—	—	—	—	—
1974–75	St. Catharines Black Hawks	OMJHL	57	44	48	92	81	1	0	0	0	2
1975–76	Fort Worth Texans	CHL	74	38	21	59	72	—	—	—	—	—
1976–77	Fort Worth Texans	CHL	75	36	24	60	57	6	1	2	3	2
1976–77	New York Islanders	NHL	—	—	—	—	—	1	0	1	1	2
1977–78	Fort Worth Texans	CHL	68	12	22	34	58	14	3	3	6	10
1978–79	Fort Worth Texans	CHL	56	11	13	24	45	—	—	—	—	—
1978–79	Fort Wayne Komets	IHL	14	1	2	3	2	13	3	3	6	6
1979–80	Dallas Black Hawks	CHL	76	24	19	43	22	—	—	—	—	—
CHL totals			349	121	99	220	254	20	4	5	9	12
NHL totals			—	—	—	—	—	1	0	1	1	2

== See also ==
- List of players who played only one game in the NHL
