= Alex Pirus =

Canadian ice hockey player

- Born: January 12, 1955 (age 70) Toronto, Ontario, Canada
- Height: 6 ft 1 in (185 cm)
- Weight: 195 lb (88 kg; 13 st 13 lb)
- Position: Centre
- Played for: Minnesota North Stars; Detroit Red Wings
- NHL draft: 41st overall, 1975; Minnesota North Stars
- WHA draft: 37th overall, 1975; Calgary Cowboys
- Playing career: 1976–1981

Joseph Alexander Pirus (born January 12, 1955) is a Canadian retired professional ice hockey centre who played 159 NHL games for the Minnesota North Stars and Detroit Red Wings. He was drafted 41st overall in the 1975 NHL Amateur Draft from the University of Notre Dame by the North Stars. Pirus was also drafted 37th overall in the 1975 WHA Amateur Draft by the Calgary Cowboys but never played in the WHA.

Pirus was born in Toronto, Ontario. He is currently a member of Hockey Ministries International

== Career statistics ==
=== Regular season and playoffs ===
			Regular season					Playoffs
Season	Team	League	GP	G	A	Pts	PIM	GP	G	A	Pts	PIM
1972–73	Richmond Hill Rams	OPJAHL	44	40	44	84	97	—	—	—	—	—
1973–74	University of Notre Dame	WCHA	28	8	16	24	22	—	—	—	—	—
1974–75	University of Notre Dame	WCHA	37	23	32	55	94	—	—	—	—	—
1975–76	University of Notre Dame	WCHA	30	26	18	44	65	—	—	—	—	—
1976–77	Minnesota North Stars	NHL	79	20	17	37	47	2	0	1	1	2
1977–78	Fort Worth Texans	CHL	18	9	6	15	4	14	6	2	8	11
1977–78	Minnesota North Stars	NHL	61	9	6	15	38	—	—	—	—	—
1978–79	Oklahoma City Stars	CHL	51	16	16	32	33	—	—	—	—	—
1978–79	Minnesota North Stars	NHL	15	1	3	4	9	—	—	—	—	—
1979–80	Oklahoma City Stars	CHL	62	23	23	46	49	—	—	—	—	—
1979–80	Detroit Red Wings	NHL	4	0	2	2	0	—	—	—	—	—
1980–81	Indianapolis Checkers	CHL	79	25	46	71	78	5	3	2	5	4
NHL totals			159	30	28	58	94	2	0	1	1	2
