= Jean-Luc Phaneuf =

Canadian ice hockey player (1955–2021)

- Born: October 26, 1955 Montreal, Quebec, Canada
- Died: May 8, 2021 (aged 65)
- Height: 5 ft 8 in (173 cm)
- Weight: 160 lb (73 kg; 11 st 6 lb)
- Position: Centre
- Shot: Right
- Played for: Toronto Toros; Birmingham Bulls
- NHL draft: 113th overall, 1975; Detroit Red Wings
- WHA draft: 109th overall, 1975; Toronto Toros
- Playing career: 1975–1977

Jean-Luc Phaneuf (October 26, 1955 – May 8, 2021) was a Canadian professional ice hockey centre who played in the World Hockey Association (WHA).

== Career ==
Drafted in the seventh round of the 1975 NHL Amateur Draft by the Detroit Red Wings, Phaneuf opted to play in the WHA after being selected by the Toronto Toros in the eighth round of the 1975 WHA Amateur Draft. He played parts of two WHA seasons for the Toros and Birmingham Bulls.

== Career statistics ==
=== Regular season and playoffs ===
			Regular season					Playoffs
Season	Team	League	GP	G	A	Pts	PIM	GP	G	A	Pts	PIM
1972–73	Montreal Red White and Blue	QMJHL	50	16	24	40	13	4	1	1	2	0
1973–74	Montreal Red White and Blue	QMJHL	66	37	48	85	2	9	4	5	9	0
1974–75	Montreal Red White and Blue	QMJHL	71	51	100	151	13	9	4	6	10	4
1975–76	Buffalo Norsemen	NAHL	2	0	1	1	0	––	––	––	––	––
1975–76	Toronto Toros	WHA	48	8	8	16	4	––	––	––	––	––
1976–77	Birmingham Bulls	WHA	30	2	7	9	2	––	––	––	––	––
1976–77	Charlotte Checkers	SHL	4	0	0	0	0	––	––	––	––	––
WHA totals			78	10	15	25	6	—	—	—	—	—

== Awards ==
- 1974–75 QMJHL First All-Star Team
- 1974–75 QMJHL Frank J. Selke Memorial Trophy
