= Joe Augustine =

American ice hockey player

- Born: December 17, 1955 (age 70) Chicago, IL, USA
- Height: 6 ft 3 in (191 cm)
- Weight: 209 lb (95 kg; 14 st 13 lb)
- Position: Defence
- Shot: Left
- Played for: IHL; Muskegon Mohawks; CHL; Tulsa Oilers; Wichita Wind; Birmingham South Stars; AHL; New Haven Nighthawks; Springfield Indians; EHL; Richmond Rifles
- NHL draft: 181st overall, 1975; Atlanta Flames
- WHA draft: 78th overall, 1975; Cleveland Crusaders
- Playing career: 1978–1983

Joe Augustine (born December 17, 1955) is an American former professional ice hockey defenceman. He is currently the head coach of the ACHA Division 1 Rhode Island Rams. Augustine was selected by the Atlanta Flames in the 11th round (181st overall) of the 1975 NHL Amateur Draft, and was also drafted by the Cleveland Crusaders in the 6th round (78th overall) of the 1975 WHA Amateur Draft.

== Playing career ==
Augustine attended Boston College where he played NCAA Division I hockey with the Boston College Eagles of the ECAC Hockey conference, but left after his junior year to play professionally. He was inducted into the Boston College Athletic Hall of Fame in 2005

== Coaching career ==
Following his playing career, Augustine spent three seasons as a high school coach, and then two seasons as an assistant coach with Brown University, before joining Rhode Island as their head coach in 1989. In 2013, Augustine recorded his 500th career win with the Rams, the second highest of all time for a University of Rhode Island coach in a single sport. Augustine was named ACHA Coach of the Year in both 2005 and 2006. Augustine won the 700th game of his coaching career on March 3, 2023 as the Rhode Island Rams defeated Drexel University 4-3 in a come from behind victory in the quarterfinals of the Eastern States Collegiate Hockey League quarterfinals. He was inducted into the RI Hockey Hall of Fame in 2024.

== Career statistics ==
			Regular season					Playoffs
Season	Team	League	GP	G	A	Pts	PIM	GP	G	A	Pts	PIM
1975–76	Boston College	NCAA	29	12	15	27	52	—	—	—	—	—
1976–77	Boston College	NCAA	30	7	26	33	90	—	—	—	—	—
1977–78	Boston College	NCAA	34	8	36	44	54	—	—	—	—	—
1978–79	Tulsa Oilers	CenHL	7	0	1	1	4	—	—	—	—	—
1978–79	Muskegon Mohawks	IHL	38	6	16	22	25	—	—	—	—	—
1979–80	New Haven Nighthawks	AHL	44	0	8	8	41	—	—	—	—	—
1979–80	Richmond Rifles	EHL-Pro	24	5	19	24	40	5	1	2	3	28
1980–81	New Haven Nighthawks	AHL	3	0	0	0	2	—	—	—	—	—
1980–81	Richmond Rifles	EHL-Pro	64	13	42	55	122	10	3	4	7	6
1981–82	Springfield Indians	AHL	73	4	12	16	75	—	—	—	—	—
1982–83	Wichita Wind	CenHL	10	1	2	3	8	—	—	—	—	—
1982–83	Birmingham South Stars	CenHL	3	0	0	0	2	—	—	—	—	—
1982–83	Muskegon Mohawks	IHL	29	5	15	20	28	4	0	1	1	11
AHL totals			120	4	20	24	118	—	—	—	—	—
CenHL totals			20	1	3	4	14	—	—	—	—	—
IHL totals			67	11	31	42	53	4	0	1	1	11
EHL-Pro totals			88	18	61	79	162	15	4	6	10	34
