= Paul Crowley (ice hockey) =

Canadian ice hockey player

- Born: December 26, 1955 (age 70) Montreal, Quebec, Canada
- Height: 5 ft 9 in (175 cm)
- Weight: 180 lb (82 kg; 12 st 12 lb)
- Position: Right wing
- Shot: Right
- Played for: Toronto Toros
- NHL draft: 166th overall, 1975; Toronto Maple Leafs
- WHA draft: 74th overall, 1975; Houston Aeros
- Playing career: 1975–1984

Paul Crowley (born December 26, 1955) is a Canadian former professional ice hockey winger who played in the World Hockey Association (WHA).

== Career ==
Drafted in the tenth round of the 1975 NHL Amateur Draft by the Toronto Maple Leafs, Crowley was also selected by the Houston Aeros in the fifth round of the 1975 WHA Amateur Draft. He played in four games for the Toronto Toros during the 1975–76 WHA season. He spent his final seven professional seasons playing for four teams in the American Hockey League (AHL).

== Career statistics ==
			Regular season					Playoffs
Season	Team	League	GP	G	A	Pts	PIM	GP	G	A	Pts	PIM
1973–74	Sudbury Wolves	OHA-Jr.	67	17	21	38	92	—	—	—	—	—
1974–75	Sudbury Wolves	OMJHL	68	29	45	74	110	—	—	—	—	—
1975–76	Toronto Toros	WHA	4	0	0	0	0	—	—	—	—	—
1975–76	Buffalo Norsemen	NAHL-Sr.	72	26	34	60	138	4	0	4	4	4
1976–77	Mohawk Valley Comets	NAHL-Sr.	4	1	2	3	2	—	—	—	—	—
1976–77	Charlotte Checkers	SHL-Sr.	50	19	26	45	73	—	—	—	—	—
1977–78	Hershey Bears	AHL	74	13	23	36	57	—	—	—	—	—
1978–79	Binghamton Dusters	AHL	75	27	20	47	77	10	2	2	4	26
1979–80	Rochester Americans	AHL	80	24	37	61	171	4	1	0	1	6
1980–81	Rochester Americans	AHL	80	24	19	43	144	—	—	—	—	—
1981–82	Binghamton Whalers	AHL	80	28	28	56	135	15	4	5	9	6
1982–83	Binghamton Whalers	AHL	80	23	28	51	97	5	1	1	2	4
1983–84	Binghamton Whalers	AHL	80	14	14	28	90	—	—	—	—	—
WHA totals			4	0	0	0	0	—	—	—	—	—
AHL totals			549	153	169	322	771	34	8	8	16	42
