= Bob Ritchie (ice hockey) =

Canadian ice hockey player (born 1955)

- Born: February 20, 1955 (age 71) Laverlochère, Quebec, Canada
- Height: 5 ft 8 in (173 cm)
- Weight: 212 lb (96 kg; 15 st 2 lb)
- Position: Left wing
- Shot: Right
- Played for: Philadelphia Flyers; Detroit Red Wings
- NHL draft: 54th overall, 1975; Philadelphia Flyers
- WHA draft: 147th overall, 1975; Toronto Toros
- Playing career: 1975–1978

Robert Ritchie (born February 20, 1955) is a Canadian former professional ice hockey left winger who played 29 National Hockey League (NHL) games with the Philadelphia Flyers and Detroit Red Wings during the 1976–77 and 1977–78 seasons.

== Career statistics ==
=== Regular season and playoffs ===
			Regular season					Playoffs
Season	Team	League	GP	G	A	Pts	PIM	GP	G	A	Pts	PIM
1971–72	Sorel Eperviers	QMJHL	62	18	24	42	31	4	1	1	2	15
1972–73	Sorel Eperviers	QMJHL	50	13	30	43	20	10	2	5	7	9
1973–74	Sorel Eperviers	QMJHL	70	37	58	95	23	14	7	10	17	14
1974–75	Sorel Eperviers	QMJHL	71	55	56	111	48	—	—	—	—	—
1975–76	Richmond Robins	AHL	42	12	10	22	19	—	—	—	—	—
1976–77	Springfield Indians	AHL	54	19	25	44	20	—	—	—	—	—
1976–77	Philadelphia Flyers	NHL	1	0	0	0	0	—	—	—	—	—
1976–77	Detroit Red Wings	NHL	17	6	2	8	10	—	—	—	—	—
1977–78	Kansas City Red Wings	CHL	52	15	21	36	16	—	—	—	—	—
1977–78	Detroit Red Wings	NHL	11	2	2	4	0	—	—	—	—	—
NHL totals			29	8	4	12	10	—	—	—	—	—
