= Ken Breitenbach =

Canadian ice hockey player (1955–2017)

- Born: January 9, 1955 Welland, Ontario, Canada
- Died: April 28, 2017 (aged 62) Ontario, Canada
- Height: 6 ft 1 in (185 cm)
- Weight: 190 lb (86 kg; 13 st 8 lb)
- Position: Defence
- Shot: Left
- Played for: Buffalo Sabres
- NHL draft: 35th overall, 1975; Buffalo Sabres
- WHA draft: 56th overall, 1975; Toronto Toros
- Playing career: 1975–1979

Kenneth Breitenbach (January 9, 1955 — April 28, 2017) was a Canadian ice hockey defenceman. He was drafted in the second round, 35th overall, of the 1975 NHL Amateur Draft by the Buffalo Sabres. In his National Hockey League career, which lasted from 1976 to 1979, Breitenbach played in 68 games, all with Buffalo, scoring one goal and adding thirteen assists. He died of cancer in 2017 at the age of 62.

== Career statistics ==
=== Regular season and playoffs ===
			Regular season					Playoffs
Season	Team	League	GP	G	A	Pts	PIM	GP	G	A	Pts	PIM
1971–72	Welland Sabres	SOJHL	34	6	18	24	44	—	—	—	—	—
1972–73	St. Catharines Black Hawks	OHA	37	1	8	9	0	—	—	—	—	—
1973–74	St. Catharines Black Hawks	OHA	68	4	34	38	46	—	—	—	—	—
1974–75	St. Catharines Black Hawks	OMJHL	65	7	30	37	143	4	0	1	1	9
1975–76	Buffalo Sabres	NHL	7	0	0	0	6	1	0	0	0	0
1975–76	Hershey Bears	AHL	57	1	19	20	58	10	1	2	3	6
1976–77	Buffalo Sabres	NHL	31	0	5	5	18	4	0	0	0	0
1976–77	Hershey Bears	AHL	37	3	8	11	29	—	—	—	—	—
1978–79	Buffalo Sabres	NHL	30	1	8	9	25	3	0	1	1	4
1978–79	Hershey Bears	AHL	17	3	2	5	14	—	—	—	—	—
AHL totals			111	7	29	36	101	10	1	2	3	6
NHL totals			68	1	13	14	49	8	0	1	1	4
