= Greg Vaydik =

Canadian ice hockey player

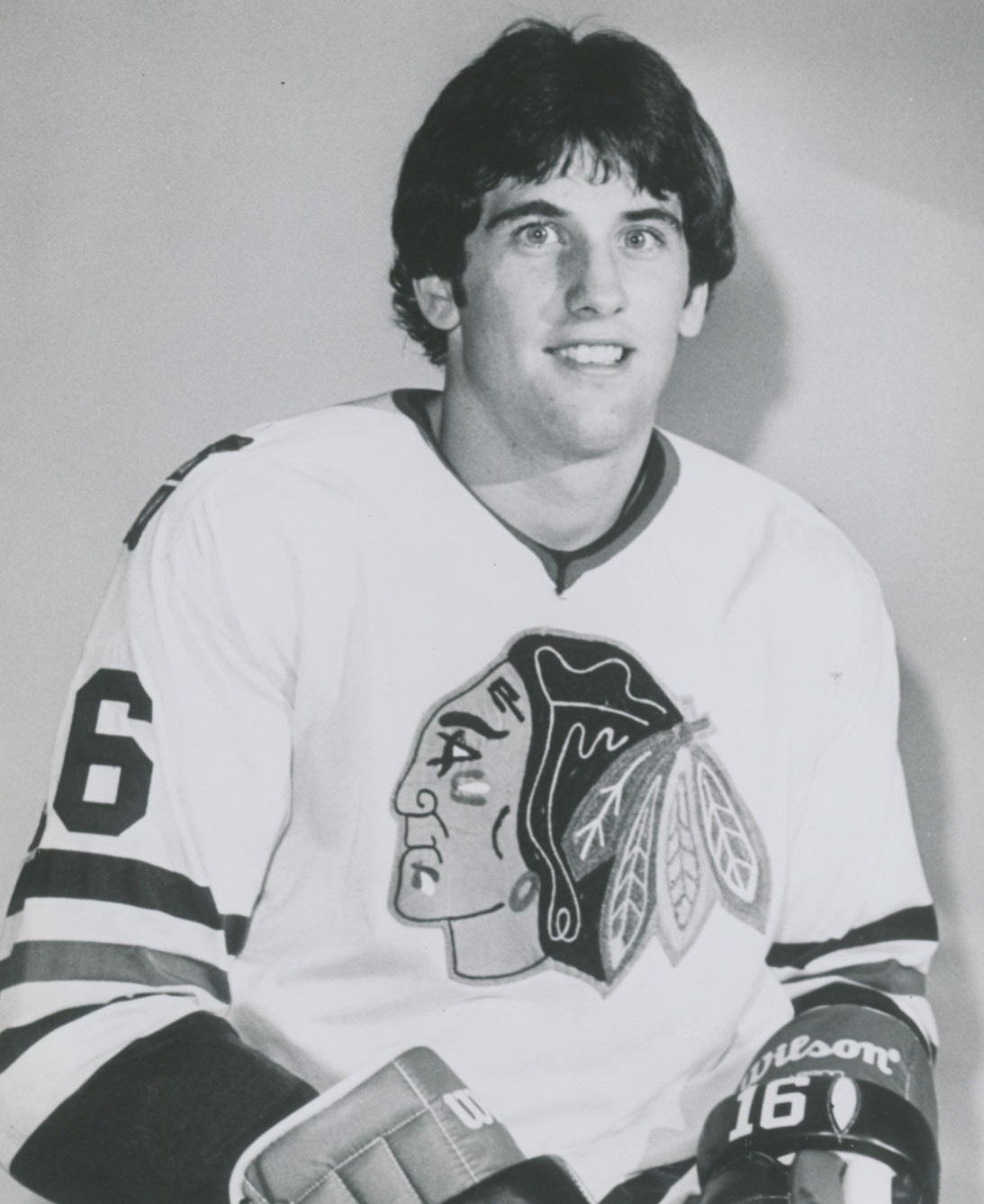
- Vaydik in 1976
- Born: October 9, 1955 (age 70) Yellowknife, Northwest Territories, Canada
- Height: 6 ft 0 in (183 cm)
- Weight: 185 lb (84 kg; 13 st 3 lb)
- Position: Centre
- Shot: Left
- Played for: Chicago Black Hawks
- NHL draft: 7th overall, 1975; Chicago Black Hawks
- WHA draft: 9th overall, 1975; Phoenix Roadrunners
- Playing career: 1975–1982

Gregory Brooks Vaydik (born October 9, 1955) is a Canadian former ice hockey player. He played 5 games in the National Hockey League (NHL) with the Chicago Black Hawks during the 1976–77 season. The rest of his career, which lasted from 1975 to 1982, was spent in the minor leagues.

== Biography ==
Vaydik was born in Yellowknife, Northwest Territories. As a youth, he played in the 1966 and 1967 Quebec International Pee-Wee Hockey Tournaments with a minor ice hockey team from Yellowknife. He was selected with the seventh overall pick in the 1975 NHL Amateur Draft by the Chicago Black Hawks, and played five games with them during the 1976–77 season without scoring any points.

== Career statistics ==
=== Regular season and playoffs ===
			Regular season					Playoffs
Season	Team	League	GP	G	A	Pts	PIM	GP	G	A	Pts	PIM
1972–73	Drumheller Falcons	AJHL	—	—	—	—	—	—	—	—	—	—
1972–73	Medicine Hat Tigers	WCHL	38	5	3	8	6	17	0	0	0	0
1973–74	Medicine Hat Tigers	WCHL	68	33	41	74	24	6	4	4	8	7
1974–75	Medicine Hat Tigers	WCHL	61	55	51	106	37	5	4	7	11	4
1975–76	Dallas Black Hawks	CHL	17	5	5	10	2	—	—	—	—	—
1976–77	Chicago Black Hawks	NHL	5	0	0	0	0	—	—	—	—	—
1976–77	Dallas Black Hawks	CHL	68	29	32	61	10	5	0	3	3	0
1977–78	Dallas Black Hawks	CHL	73	26	18	44	8	13	3	3	6	4
1978–79	Rochester Americans	AHL	80	16	25	41	10	—	—	—	—	—
1979–80	New Brunswick Hawks	AHL	60	12	19	31	0	—	—	—	—	—
1980–81	Dallas Black Hawks	CHL	26	6	5	11	6	—	—	—	—	—
1981–82	Dallas Black Hawks	CHL	65	20	30	50	20	16	3	6	9	8
CHL totals			249	86	90	176	46	34	6	12	18	12
NHL totals			5	0	0	0	0	—	—	—	—	—

=== International ===
Year	Team	Event	GP	G	A	Pts	PIM
1975	Canada	WJC	3	0	1	1	0
Junior totals			3	0	1	1	0

Preceded by Grant Mulvey	Chicago Blackhawks first-round draft pick 1975	Succeeded by Real Cloutier
Preceded by Dennis Olmstead	Phoenix Roadrunners first round draft pick 1975	Succeeded by None
