= Paul Heaver =

British-Canadian ice hockey player

- Born: February 15, 1955 (age 71) Paddington, England, UK
- Height: 6 ft 1 in (185 cm)
- Weight: 190 lb (86 kg; 13 st 8 lb)
- Position: Defence
- Shot: Right
- Played for: Toronto Toros; Birmingham Bulls
- NHL draft: 98th overall, 1975; Atlanta Flames
- WHA draft: 41st overall, 1975; Toronto Toros
- Playing career: 1975–1977

Paul Gerhard Heaver (born February 15, 1955) is a British-Canadian former professional ice hockey player who played in the World Hockey Association (WHA). Drafted in the sixth round of the 1975 NHL Amateur Draft by the Atlanta Flames, Heaver opted to play in the WHA after being selected by the Toronto Toros in the third round of the 1975 WHA Amateur Draft. He played parts of two WHA seasons for the Toros and Birmingham Bulls.

Heaver was born in Paddington, England, United Kingdom, but grew up in Toronto, Ontario. As a youth, he played in the 1967 Quebec International Pee-Wee Hockey Tournament with the Toronto Swiss Chalet minor ice hockey team.

== Career statistics ==
=== Regular season and playoffs ===
			Regular season					Playoffs
Season	Team	League	GP	G	A	Pts	PIM	GP	G	A	Pts	PIM
1972–73	Oshawa Generals	OHA	51	4	7	11	100	––	––	––	––	––
1973–74	Oshawa Generals	OHA	70	3	16	19	131	––	––	––	––	––
1974–75	Oshawa Generals	OHA	67	10	24	34	163	––	––	––	––	––
1975–76	Buffalo Norsemen	NAHL	11	2	5	7	21	––	––	––	––	––
1975–76	Toronto Toros	WHA	66	2	12	14	83	––	––	––	––	––
1976–77	Birmingham Bulls	WHA	5	0	0	0	0	––	––	––	––	––
1976–77	Mohawk Valley Comets	NAHL	17	2	5	7	19	4	0	1	1	0
1976–77	Charlotte Checkers	SHL	37	4	6	10	54	––	––	––	––	––
WHA totals			71	2	12	14	83	—	—	—	—	—
