= Gary Burns (ice hockey) =

American ice hockey player

- Born: January 16, 1955 (age 70); Cambridge, Massachusetts, U.S.
- Height: 6 ft 1 in (185 cm)
- Weight: 190 lb (86 kg; 13 st 8 lb)
- Position: Forward
- Shot: Left
- Played for: New York Rangers
- NHL draft: 191st overall, 1975; Toronto Maple Leafs
- WHA draft: 126th overall, 1975; Cincinnati Stingers
- Playing career: 1978–1986

Gary Burns (born January 16, 1955) is an American former professional ice hockey forward. He played 11 games in the National Hockey League for the New York Rangers during the 1980–81 season, and 5 playoff games with the Rangers in 1981 and 1982. The rest of his career, which lasted from 1978 to 1986, was spent in the minor leagues.

== Early life ==
Burns was born in Cambridge, Massachusetts, and raised in Arlington, Massachusetts. From 1974 to 1978, he played for the New Hampshire Wildcats at the University of New Hampshire.

== Career ==
Burns was drafted 191st overall by the Toronto Maple Leafs in the 1975 NHL Amateur Draft and 126th overall by the Cincinnati Stingers in the 1975 WHA Amateur Draft. He made his NHL debut with the New York Rangers during the 1980–81 season, playing in eleven regular season games, scoring two goals and two assists, as well as in one playoff game. He also played in four playoff games for the Rangers the following season.

He won the 1983-84 CHL Championship (Adams Cup) as a member of the Tulsa Oilers team coached by Tom Webster.

== Career statistics ==
=== Regular season and playoffs ===
			Regular season					Playoffs
Season	Team	League	GP	G	A	Pts	PIM	GP	G	A	Pts	PIM
1973–74	Arlington North Shore	HS-MA	—	—	—	—	—	—	—	—	—	—
1974–75	University of New Hampshire	ECAC	31	17	15	32	42	—	—	—	—	—
1975–76	University of New Hampshire	ECAC	29	6	12	18	36	—	—	—	—	—
1976–77	University of New Hampshire	ECAC	38	9	6	15	24	—	—	—	—	—
1977–78	University of New Hampshire	ECAC	29	9	19	28	55	—	—	—	—	—
1978–79	Rochester Americans	AHL	79	16	30	46	99	—	—	—	—	—
1979–80	Binghamton Dusters	AHL	79	30	29	59	105	—	—	—	—	—
1980–81	New York Rangers	NHL	11	2	2	4	18	1	0	0	0	2
1980–81	New Haven Nighthawks	AHL	69	25	29	54	137	4	1	0	1	2
1981–82	Springfield Indians	AHL	78	27	39	66	71	—	—	—	—	—
1981–82	New York Rangers	NHL	—	—	—	—	—	4	0	0	0	4
1982–83	Tulsa Oilers	CHL	80	21	33	54	61	—	—	—	—	—
1983–84	Tulsa Oilers	CHL	68	28	30	58	95	9	3	9	12	2
1984–85	Rochester Americans	AHL	76	22	27	49	64	2	0	1	1	6
1985–86	Salt Lake Golden Eagles	IHL	78	23	35	58	85	4	1	0	1	6
NHL totals			11	2	2	4	18	5	0	0	0	0
