= Michel Lachance =

Canadian ice hockey player

- Born: April 11, 1955 (age 70) Quebec City, Quebec, Canada
- Height: 6 ft 0 in (183 cm)
- Weight: 190 lb (86 kg; 13 st 8 lb)
- Position: Defence
- Shot: Right
- Played for: Colorado Rockies
- NHL draft: 106th overall, 1975; Montreal Canadiens
- WHA draft: 92nd overall, 1975; Cleveland Crusaders
- Playing career: 1976–1980

Michel Lachance (born April 11, 1955) is a Canadian former professional ice hockey defenceman who played 21 games in the National Hockey League for the Colorado Rockies. As a youth, he played in the 1967 Quebec International Pee-Wee Hockey Tournament with the Quebec Citadelle minor ice hockey team.

== Career statistics ==
=== Regular season and playoffs ===
			Regular season					Playoffs
Season	Team	League	GP	G	A	Pts	PIM	GP	G	A	Pts	PIM
1971–72	Quebec Remparts	QMJHL	5	0	2	2	6	—	—	—	—	—
1972–73	Quebec Remparts	QMJHL	51	1	8	9	49	15	0	2	2	29
1973–74	Quebec Remparts	QMJHL	70	9	63	72	170	16	1	7	8	38
1973–74	Quebec Remparts	M-Cup	—	—	—	—	—	4	1	4	5	4
1974–75	Quebec Remparts	QMJHL	30	7	14	21	81	—	—	—	—	—
1974–75	Montreal Bleu Blanc Rouge	QMJHL	34	6	30	36	77	9	2	8	10	36
1976–77	Greensboro Generals	SHL	40	7	10	17	108	—	—	—	—	—
1976–77	Baltimore Clippers	SHL	10	0	4	4	16	—	—	—	—	—
1976–77	Maine Nordiques	NAHL	4	1	0	1	5	—	—	—	—	—
1976–77	Milwaukee Admirals	USHL	7	1	2	3	33	—	—	—	—	—
1977–78	Milwaukee Admirals	IHL	72	19	23	42	210	—	—	—	—	—
1978–79	Colorado Rockies	NHL	21	0	4	4	22	—	—	—	—	—
1978–79	Philadelphia Firebirds	AHL	22	1	5	6	42	—	—	—	—	—
1978–79	Tulsa Oilers	CHL	22	2	5	7	35	—	—	—	—	—
1978–79	New Brunswick Hawks	AHL	10	4	1	5	0	5	0	2	2	4
1979–80	Fort Worth Texans	CHL	76	12	25	37	95	—	—	—	—	—
1980–81	HC Caen	FRA	26	11	4	15	—	—	—	—	—	—
NHL totals			21	0	4	4	22	—	—	—	—	—
