= Dale McMullin =

Canadian ice hockey player

- Born: March 13, 1955 (age 71) Procter, British Columbia, Canada
- Height: 5 ft 10 in (178 cm)
- Weight: 175 lb (79 kg; 12 st 7 lb)
- Position: Left wing
- Shot: Left
- Played for: Edmonton Oilers
- NHL draft: 116th overall, 1975; Atlanta Flames
- WHA draft: 95th overall, 1975; Phoenix Roadrunners
- Playing career: 1976–1979

Dale McMullin (born March 13, 1955) is a Canadian former ice hockey player. McMullin was born in Procter, British Columbia, but grew up in Nelson, British Columbia.

McMullin played at the junior level with the Brandon Wheat Kings at scored over 100 points in a season twice. In the 1975 World Junior Ice Hockey Championships, he tied for the most points (8) with three other players with three goals and five assists as Canada finished second. He was drafted 116th overall in the 1975 NHL Amateur Draft by the Atlanta Flames and 95th overall in the 1975 WHA Amateur Draft by the Phoenix Roadrunners. He however never played in the National Hockey League and played just one game in the World Hockey Association for the Edmonton Oilers. He made two shots on net and didn't play in the WHA, although McMullin harbored no ill feelings, stating “I guess you could say it was a cup of coffee. I was right on the doorstep of getting in but I just wasn’t good enough obviously.” He continued to play in other leagues, most notably winning the 1982 Allan Cup with the Cranbrook Royals. By the time he left hockey in 1985, he was already working a job with a dairy distributor that saw him work 36 hours a week; he stayed there for twenty years. McMullin had two sons participate in hockey. McMullin scouted for the Red Deer Rebels from 2002 to 2011 before being hired to scout the Regina Pats in 2011.

== Career statistics ==
=== Regular season and playoffs ===
			Regular season					Playoffs
Season	Team	League	GP	G	A	Pts	PIM	GP	G	A	Pts	PIM
1970–71	Brandon Wheat Kings	WCHL	1	0	0	0	0	—	—	—	—	—
1971–72	Brandon Wheat Kings	WCHL	59	12	12	24	4	—	—	—	—	—
1972–73	Brandon Wheat Kings	WCHL	64	28	41	69	19	—	—	—	—	—
1973–74	Brandon Wheat Kings	WCHL	48	35	65	100	6	—	—	—	—	—
1974–75	Brandon Wheat Kings	WCHL	65	37	58	95	19	5	5	1	6	0
1975–76	Brandon Wheat Kings	WCHL	72	56	74	130	28	5	3	3	6	5
1976–77	Spokane Flyers	WIHL	––	31	29	60	20	—	—	—	—	—
1976–77	Tulsa Oilers	CHL	3	1	1	2	0	—	—	—	—	—
1977–78	Edmonton Oilers	WHA	1	0	0	0	0	—	—	—	—	—
1977–78	Spokane Flyers	WIHL	––	33	30	63	13	—	—	—	—	—
1978–79	Tucson Rustlers	PHL	29	6	7	13	13	—	—	—	—	—
WHA totals			1	0	0	0	0	–	–	–	–	–

=== International ===
Year	Team	Event	GP	G	A	Pts	PIM
1975	Canada	WJC	7	3	5	8	—
Junior totals			7	3	5	8	—
