= Mike Sleep =

Canadian ice hockey player

- Born: March 13, 1955 (age 70) Montreal, Quebec, Canada
- Height: 6 ft 0 in (183 cm)
- Weight: 180 lb (82 kg; 12 st 12 lb)
- Position: Right wing
- Shot: Right
- Played for: Phoenix Roadrunners
- NHL draft: 101st overall, 1975; New York Islanders
- WHA draft: 68th overall, 1975; Phoenix Roadrunners
- Playing career: 1975–1979

Michael William Sleep (born March 13, 1955) is a Canadian former professional ice hockey player who played in the World Hockey Association (WHA). Drafted in the sixth round of the 1975 NHL Amateur Draft by the New York Islanders, Sleep opted to play in the WHA after being selected by the Phoenix Roadrunners in the fifth round of the 1975 WHA Amateur Draft. He played parts of two WHA seasons for the Roadrunners. Sleep was born in Montreal, Quebec.

== Career statistics ==
| | | | Regular season | | | | | Playoffs |
| Season | Team | League | GP | G | A | Pts | PIM | GP | G | A | Pts | PIM |
|---|---|---|---|---|---|---|---|---|---|---|---|---|
| 1970–71 | St. James Canadians | MJHL | 15 | 5 | 6 | 11 | 9 | — | — | — | — | — |
| 1971–72 | St. James Canadians | MJHL | 34 | 21 | 24 | 45 | 45 | — | — | — | — | — |
| 1972–73 | St. James Canadians | MJHL | 43 | 19 | 30 | 49 | 34 | — | — | — | — | — |
| 1973–74 | Flin Flon Bombers | WCHL | 11 | 2 | 2 | 4 | 2 | — | — | — | — | — |
| 1973–74 | New Westminster Bruins | WCHL | 39 | 8 | 13 | 21 | 17 | — | — | — | — | — |
| 1974–75 | New Westminster Bruins | WCHL | 70 | 28 | 34 | 62 | 91 | 16 | 2 | 5 | 7 | 22 |
| 1975–76 | Phoenix Roadrunners | WHA | 9 | 2 | 0 | 2 | 0 | 3 | 0 | 0 | 0 | 0 |
| 1975–76 | Tucson Mavericks | CHL | 69 | 23 | 30 | 53 | 46 | — | — | — | — | — |
| 1976–77 | Phoenix Roadrunners | WHA | 13 | 2 | 2 | 4 | 6 | — | — | — | — | — |
| 1976–77 | Oklahoma City Blazers | CHL | 66 | 21 | 35 | 56 | 48 | — | — | — | — | — |
| 1977–78 | Green Bay Bobcats | USHL-Sr. | 39 | 17 | 22 | 39 | 112 | — | — | — | — | — |
| WHA totals | | | 22 | 4 | 2 | 6 | 6 | 3 | 0 | 0 | 0 | 0 |
| CHL totals | | | 135 | 44 | 65 | 109 | 94 | — | — | — | — | — |
