= Joe Fortunato (ice hockey) =

Canadian ice hockey player

- Born: January 1, 1955 (age 71) Bari, Italy
- Height: 5 ft 9 in (175 cm)
- Weight: 170 lb (77 kg; 12 st 2 lb)
- Position: Left wing
- Shot: Left
- Played for: WHA; Edmonton Oilers; NAHL; Erie Blades; Cape Codders; Maine Nordiques; IHL; Dayton Gems
- NHL draft: 47th overall, 1975; New York Islanders
- WHA draft: 104th overall, 1975; Cleveland Crusaders
- Playing career: 1975–1977

Joe Fortunato (born January 1, 1955) is a Canadian former professional ice hockey player.

== Career ==
Fortunato was selected by the New York Islanders in the third round (47th overall) of the 1975 NHL Amateur Draft and was also drafted by the Cleveland Crusaders in the 8th round (104th overall) of the 1975 WHA Amateur Draft.

Fortunato played professional hockey for two seasons (1975–76 and 1976–77), recording 68 games in the minor leagues and one game in the World Hockey Association with the Edmonton Oilers, in 1976–77.

== Career statistics ==
=== Regular season and playoffs ===
			Regular season					Playoffs
Season	Team	League	GP	G	A	Pts	PIM	GP	G	A	Pts	PIM
1972–73	Kitchener Rangers	OHA	62	35	34	69	45	—	—	—	—	—
1973–74	Kitchener Rangers	OHA	66	31	49	80	27	—	—	—	—	—
1974–75	Kitchener Rangers	OHA	53	28	38	66	43	—	—	—	—	—
1975–76	Erie Blades	NAHL	45	10	19	29	49	—	—	—	—	—
1975–76	Cape Codders	NAHL	4	2	2	4	0	—	—	—	—	—
1976–77	Dayton Gems	IHL	4	0	1	1	2	—	—	—	—	—
1976–77	Edmonton Oilers	WHA	1	0	0	0	0	—	—	—	—	—
1976–77	Maine Nordiques	NAHL	15	3	7	10	17	—	—	—	—	—
WHA totals			1	0	0	0	0	–	–	–	–	–
