= 1975 WHA amateur draft =

General information
- Date: May 22, 1975

Overview
- 175 total selections in 14 rounds
- First selection: (Canada) Claude Larose; Selected by: Cincinnati Stingers

The 1975 WHA amateur draft was the third draft held by the World Hockey Association.

== Selections by round ==
Below are listed the selections in the 1975 WHA amateur draft.

Selections by round

Round 1 | Round 2 | Round 3 | Round 4 | Round 5 | Round 6 | Round 7 | Round 8 | Round 9 | Round 10 | Round 11 | Round 12 | Round 13 | Round 14

=== Round 1 ===
#	Player	Nationality	WHA team	College/junior/club team
1	Claude Larose (LW)	Canada	Cincinnati Stingers	Sherbrooke Castors (QMJHL)
2	Bryan Maxwell (D)	Canada	Indianapolis Racers	Medicine Hat Tigers (WCHL)
3	Don Ashby (C)	Canada	Michigan Stags	Calgary Centennials (WCHL)
4	Mel Bridgman (C)	Canada	Denver Spurs	Victoria Cougars (WCHL)
5	Ralph Klassen (F)	Canada	Cleveland Crusaders	Saskatoon Blades (WCHL)
6	Barry Dean (LW)	Canada	Edmonton Oilers	Medicine Hat Tigers (WCHL)
7	Denny McLean (LW)	Canada	Calgary Cowboys	Calgary Centennials (WCHL)
8	Brad Gassoff (LW)	Canada	Winnipeg Jets	Kamloops Chiefs (WCHL)
9	Greg Vaydik (F)	Canada	Phoenix Roadrunners	Medicine Hat Tigers (WCHL)
10	Greg Hickey (LW)	Canada	Minnesota Fighting Saints	Hamilton Fincups (OHA)
11	Rick Lapointe (D)	Canada	Toronto Toros	Victoria Cougars (WCHL)
12	Jamie Masters (D)	Canada	San Diego Mariners	Ottawa 67's (OHA)
13	Terry McDonald (C)	Canada	New England Whalers	Edmonton Oil Kings (WCHL)
14	Pierre Mondou (F)	Canada	Quebec Nordiques	Montreal Red White and Blue (QMJHL)
15	Richard Mulhern (D)	Canada	Houston Aeros	Sherbrooke Castors (QMJHL)

=== Round 2 ===
#	Player	Nationality	WHA team	College/junior/club team
16	Bob Sauve (G)	Canada	Cincinnati Stingers	Laval National (QMJHL)
17	Don Cairns (LW)	Canada	Michigan Stags (from Indianapolis)	Victoria Cougars (WCHL)
18	Robin Sadler (D)	Austria	Michigan Stags	Edmonton Oil Kings (WCHL)
19	Mal Zinger (F)	Canada	Cleveland Crusaders (from Denver)	Kamloops Chiefs (WCHL)
20	Kelly Greenbank (RW)	Austria	Cleveland Crusaders	Winnipeg Clubs (WCHL)
21	Peter Morris (LW)	Canada	Edmonton Oilers	Victoria Cougars (WCHL)
22	Russ Anderson (D)	United States	Winnipeg Jets (from Calgary)	University of Minnesota (WCHA)
23	Neil Lyseng (RW)	Canada	Phoenix Roadrunners (Winnipeg)	Kamloops Chiefs (WCHL)
24	Mike O'Connell (D)	United States	Phoenix Roadrunners	Kingston Canadians (OHA)
25	Kim Clackson (D)	Canada	Minnesota Fighting Saints	Victoria Cougars (WCHL)
26	Jerry Rollins (D)	Canada	Toronto Toros	Winnipeg Clubs (WCHL)
27	Rick Adduono (C)	Canada	San Diego Mariners	St. Catharines Black Hawks (OHA)
28	Danny Arndt (LW)	Canada	New England Whalers	Saskatoon Blades (WCHL)
29	Doug Halward (D)	Canada	Quebec Nordiques	Peterborough Petes (OHA)
30	Doug Jarvis (C)	Canada	Houston Aeros	Peterborough Petes (OHA)

=== Round 3 ===
#	Player	Nationality	WHA team	College/junior/club team
31	Larry Hendrick (G)	Canada	Cincinnati Stingers	Calgary Centennials (WCHL)
32	Clark Hamilton (C)	United States	Indianapolis Racers	University of Notre Dame (WCHA)
33	Gordon Laxton (G)	Canada	Michigan Stags	New Westminster Bruins (WCHL)
34	Ron Delorme (RW)	Canada	Denver Spurs	Lethbridge Broncos (WCHL)
35	Ed Staniowski (G)	Canada	Cleveland Crusaders	Regina Pats (WCHL)
36	Barry Smith (C)	Canada	Edmonton Oilers	New Westminster Bruins (WCHL)
37	Alex Pirus (C)	Canada	Calgary Cowboys	University of Notre Dame (WCHA)
38	Glen Richardson (LW)	Canada	Winnipeg Jets	Hamilton Fincups (OHA)
39	Blair Davidson (D)	Canada	Phoenix Roadrunners	Flin Flon Bombers (WCHL)
40	Greg Neeld (D)	Canada	Minnesota Fighting Saints	Calgary Centennials (WCHL)
41	Paul Heaver (D)	Canada	Toronto Toros	Oshawa Generals (OHA)
42	Bob Watson (RW)	Canada	San Diego Mariners	Flin Flon Bombers (WCHL)
43	Matti Hagman (C)	Finland	New England Whalers	HIFK (SM-sarja)
44	Pierre Giroux (LW)	Canada	Quebec Nordiques	Hull Festivals (QMJHL)
45	Kevin Campbell (D)	Canada	Houston Aeros	St. Lawrence University (ECAC)

=== Round 4 ===
#	Player	Nationality	WHA team	College/junior/club team
46	Norm LaPointe (G)	Canada	Cincinnati Stingers	Trois-Rivieres Draveurs (QMJHL)
47	Blair MacKasey (D)	Canada	Indianapolis Racers	Montreal Red White and Blue (QMJHL)
48	Rick Bourbonnais (RW)	Canada	Michigan Stags	Ottawa 67's (OHA)
49	Andre Leduc (D)	Canada	Denver Spurs	Sherbrooke Castors (QMJHL)
50	Peter Scamurra (D)	Canada	Cleveland Crusaders	Peterborough Petes (OHA)
51	Stu Younger (F)	Canada	Edmonton Oilers	Michigan Tech University (WCHA)
52	Rick Piche (D)	Canada	Calgary Cowboys	Brandon Wheat Kings (WCHL)
53	Ted Long (LW)	Canada	Winnipeg Jets	Hamilton Fincups (OHA)
54	Roger Swanson (G)	Canada	Phoenix Roadrunners	Flin Flon Bombers (WCHL)
55	Bob Hoffmeyer (D)	Canada	Minnesota Fighting Saints	Saskatoon Blades (WCHL)
56	Ken Breitenbach (D)	Canada	Toronto Toros	St. Catharines Black Hawks (OHA)
57	Dan Blair (RW)	Canada	San Diego Mariners	Ottawa 67's (OHA)
58	Derek Spring (F)	Canada	New England Whalers	Brandon Wheat Kings (WCHL)
59	Ted Bulley (LW)	Canada	Quebec Nordiques	Hull Festivals (QMJHL)
60	Dave Salvian (LW)	Canada	Houston Aeros	St. Catharines Black Hawks (OHA)

=== Round 5 ===
#	Player	Nationality	WHA team	College/junior/club team
61	Paul Harrison (G)	Canada	Cincinnati Stingers	Oshawa Generals (OHA)
62	Rick Bowness (C)	Canada	Indianapolis Racers	Montreal Red White and Blue (QMJHL)
63	Dale Ross (F)	Canada	Michigan Stags	Ottawa 67's (OHA)
64	Nick Sanza (G)	Canada	Denver Spurs	Sherbrooke Castors (QMJHL)
65	Dennis Maruk (F)	Canada	Cleveland Crusaders	London Knights (OHA)
66	Jim Ofrim (F)	Canada	Edmonton Oilers	University of Alberta (CWUAA)
67	Terry Bucyk (RW)	Canada	Calgary Cowboys	Lethbridge Broncos (WCHL)
68	Mike Sleep (RW)	Canada	Phoenix Roadrunners	New Westminster Bruins (WCHL)
69	Jim Minor (C)	Canada	Minnesota Fighting Saints	Regina Pats (WCHL)
70	Mario Viens (G)	Canada	Toronto Toros	Cornwall Royals (QMJHL)
71	Craig Crawford (C)	Canada	San Diego Mariners	Toronto Marlboros (OHA)
72	Gary McFadyen (RW)	Canada	New England Whalers	Hull Festivals (QMJHL)
73	Andre LePage (G)	Canada	Quebec Nordiques	Montreal Red White and Blue (QMJHL)
74	Paul Crowley (RW)	Canada	Houston Aeros	Sudbury Wolves (OHA)

=== Round 6 ===
#	Player	Nationality	WHA team	College/junior/club team
75	Jackie Laine (F)	Canada	Cincinnati Stingers	Bowling Green State University (CCHA)
76	Eric Sanderson (LW)	Canada	Indianapolis Racers	Victoria Cougars (WCHL)
77	Greg Miazga (F)	Canada	Denver Spurs	Victoria Cougars (WCHL)
78	Joe Augustine (D)	United States	Cleveland Crusaders	Austin Mavericks (MidJHL)
79	Bob Sunderland (D)	United States	Edmonton Oilers	Boston University (ECAC)
80	Pat Hughes (F)	Canada	Calgary Cowboys	University of Michigan (WCHA)
81	Nick Bobstock	Canada	Winnipeg Jets	Acadia University
82	Dana Decker (LW)	United States	Phoenix Roadrunners	Michigan Tech University (WCHA)
83	Brian Shmyr (C)	Canada	Minnesota Fighting Saints	New Westminster Bruins (WCHL)
84	Paul Woods (F)	Canada	Toronto Toros	Sault Ste. Marie Greyhounds (OHA)
85	Alex Tidey (RW)	Canada	San Diego Mariners	Lethbridge Broncos (WCHL)
86	Terry Martin (F)	Canada	New England Whalers	London Knights (OHA)
87	Jean Trottier (C)	Canada	Quebec Nordiques	Laval National (QMJHL)
88	Bill Cheropita (G)	Canada	Houston Aeros	St. Catharines Black Hawks (OHA)

=== Round 7 ===
#	Player	Nationality	WHA team	College/junior/club team
89	Gary Carr (G)	Canada	Cincinnati Stingers	Toronto Marlboros (OHA)
90	Doug Young (D)	Canada	Indianapolis Racers	Michigan Tech University (WCHA)
91	Rick Martin (C)	Canada	Denver Spurs	Victoria Cougars (WCHL)
92	Michel Lachance (D)	Canada	Cleveland Crusaders	Montreal Red White and Blue (QMJHL)
93	Dave Bell (F)	Canada	Edmonton Oilers	Harvard University (ECAC)
94	Greg Smith (D)	Canada	Calgary Cowboys	Colorado College (WCHA)
95	Dale McMullin (LW)	Canada	Phoenix Roadrunners	Brandon Wheat Kings (WCHL)
96	Marc Tessier (C)	Canada	Minnesota Fighting Saints	Sherbrooke Castors (QMJHL)
97	Byron Shutt (F)	Canada	Toronto Toros	Bowling Green State University (CCHA)
98	Rick Lalonde (D)	Canada	San Diego Mariners	Calgary Centennials (WCHL)
99	John Tweedle (F)	Canada	New England Whalers	Lake Superior State University (CCHA)
100	Mike Backman (RW)	Canada	Quebec Nordiques	Montreal Red White and Blue (QMJHL)
101	John Glynne (D)	United States	Houston Aeros	University of Vermont (ECAC)

=== Round 8 ===
#	Player	Nationality	WHA team	College/junior/club team
102	Greg Clause (RW)	Canada	Cincinnati Stingers	Hamilton Fincups (OHA)
103	Stan Jonathan (LW)	Canada	Indianapolis Racers	Peterborough Petes (OHA)
104	Joe Fortunato (LW)	Canada	Cleveland Crusaders	Kitchener Rangers (OHA)
105	Sidney Veysey (C)	Canada	Edmonton Oilers	Sherbrooke Castors (QMJHL)
106	Doug Lindskog (LW)	Canada	Calgary Cowboys	University of Michigan (WCHA)
107	Gary Morrison (F)	United States	Phoenix Roadrunners	University of Michigan (WCHA)
108	Bob McNeice (LW)	Canada	Minnesota Fighting Saints	New Westminster Bruins (WCHL)
109	Jean-Luc Phaneuf (C)	Canada	Toronto Toros	Montreal Red White and Blue (QMJHL)
110	Kelly Secord (F)	Canada	San Diego Mariners	New Westminster Bruins (WCHL)
111	Mike Harazny (D)	Canada	New England Whalers	Regina Pats (WCHL)
112	Michel Brisebois (F)	Canada	Quebec Nordiques	Sherbrooke Castors (QMJHL)
113	Dave Taylor (F)	Canada	Houston Aeros	Clarkson University (ECAC)

=== Round 9 ===
#	Player	Nationality	WHA team	College/junior/club team
114	Yvon Disotell (F)	Canada	Cincinnati Stingers	Cornwall Royals (QMJHL)
115	Larry Huras (D)	Canada	Indianapolis Racers	Kitchener Rangers (OHA)
116	Viktor Khatulev (F)	Latvia	Cleveland Crusaders	Dynamo Riga (USSR)
117	Bob Russell (C)	Canada	Edmonton Oilers	Sudbury Wolves (OHA)
118	Paul Clarke (RW)	Canada	Calgary Cowboys	University of Notre Dame (WCHA)
119	Jim Gustafson (LW)	Canada	Winnipeg Jets	Victoria Cougars (WCHL)
120	Dave Faulkner (C)	Canada	Minnesota Fighting Saints	Regina Pats (WCHL)
121	Gilles Bilodeau (LW)	Canada	Toronto Toros	Sorel Black Hawks (QMJHL)
122	Alex Forsyth (F)	Canada	San Diego Mariners	Kingston Canadians (OHA)
123	Dave Norris (LW)	Canada	New England Whalers	Hamilton Fincups (OHA)
124	Michel Hamel (C)	Canada	Quebec Nordiques	Laval National (QMJHL)
125	Jim Maxfield (D)	Canada	Houston Aeros	Sudbury Wolves (OHA)

=== Round 10 ===
#	Player	Nationality	WHA team	College/junior/club team
126	Gary Burns (F)	United States	Cincinnati Stingers	University of New Hampshire (ECAC)
127	Kari Makkonen (F)	Finland	Indianapolis Racers	Assat Pori (SM-sarja)
128	Dave Bossy (D)	Canada	Denver Spurs	University of Notre Dame (WCHA)
129	Ari Kankaanpera (D)	Finland	Cleveland Crusaders	Ilves Tampere (SM-sarja)
130	Jean Thibodeau (F)	Canada	Edmonton Oilers	Shawinigan Dynamos (QMJHL)
131	Randy Koch (F)	United States	Calgary Cowboys	University of Vermont (ECAC)
132	Dag Bredberg (F)	Sweden	Winnipeg Jets	Farjestads BK (Sweden)
133	Denis Daigle (LW)	Canada	Minnesota Fighting Saints	Montreal Red White and Blue (QMJHL)
134	Roger Dorey (F)	Canada	Toronto Toros	Kingston Canadians (OHA)
135	Don Edwards (G)	Canada	San Diego Mariners	Kitchener Rangers (OHA)
136	Paul Stevenson (F)	United States	New England Whalers	Brown University (ECAC)
137	Florent Fortier (F)	Canada	Quebec Nordiques	Quebec Remparts (QMJHL)
138	Chad Campbell (LW)	Canada	Houston Aeros	University of Denver (WCHA)

=== Round 11 ===
#	Player	Nationality	WHA team	College/junior/club team
139	Bill Reber (RW)	United States	Cincinnati Stingers	University of Vermont (ECAC)
140	Michel Blais (D)	Canada	Indianapolis Racers	Kingston Canadians (OHA)
141	Andy Whitby (F)	Canada	Denver Spurs	Oshawa Generals (OHA)
142	Tom McNamara (G)	United States	Cleveland Crusaders	University of Vermont (ECAC)
143	Brian Petrovek (G)	United States	Edmonton Oilers	Harvard University (ECAC)
144	Dan Tsubouchi (RW)	Canada	Calgary Cowboys	St. Louis University (CCHA)
145	Emil Meszaros (F)	Sweden	Winnipeg Jets	Vastra Frolunda (Sweden)
146	Earl Sargent (W)	United States	Minnesota Fighting Saints	Fargo-Moorhead Sugar Kings (MidJHL)
147	Bob Ritchie (LW)	Canada	Toronto Toros	Sorel Black Hawks (QMJHL)
148	Dale Anderson (D)	Canada	San Diego Mariners	Brandon Wheat Kings (WCHL)
149	Clark Jantzie (F)	Canada	New England Whalers	University of Alberta (CWUAA)
150	Bill Oleschuk (G)	Canada	Houston Aeros	Saskatoon Blades (WCHL)

=== Round 12 ===
#	Player	Nationality	WHA team	College/junior/club team
151	David McNab (G)	Canada	Cincinnati Stingers	University of Wisconsin (WCHA)
152	Anders Steen (F)	Sweden	Indianapolis Racers	Farjestads BK (Sweden)
153	Rick Marsh (D)	Canada	Cleveland Crusaders	R.P.I. (ECAC)
154	Jim Montgomery (C)	Canada	Edmonton Oilers	Hull Festivals (QMJHL)
155	Bill Anderson (D)	Canada	Calgary Cowboys	St. Louis University (CCHA)
156	Torbjorn Nilsson (F)	Sweden	Winnipeg Jets	Skelleftea AIK (Sweden)
157	Richard Dutton (D)	Canada	Minnesota Fighting Saints	Laval National (QMJHL)
158	Bob Shaw (D)	Canada	Toronto Toros	Clarkson University (ECAC)
159	Bruce O'Grady (F)	Canada	San Diego Mariners	Sault Ste. Marie Greyhounds (OHA)
160	Jim Lundquist (D)	United States	Houston Aeros	Brown University (ECAC)

=== Round 13 ===
#	Player	Nationality	WHA team	College/junior/club team
161	Peter Shier (D)	Canada	Cincinnati Stingers	Cornell University (ECAC)
162	Paul Evans (RW)	Canada	Indianapolis Racers	Peterborough Petes (OHA)
163	Dan Shearer (G)	Canada	Cleveland Crusaders	Drumheller Falcons (AJHL)
164	Terry Angel (F)	Canada	Edmonton Oilers	Oshawa Generals (OHA)
165	Doug Hanson	Canada	Calgary Cowboys	
166	Bengt Lundholm (F)	Sweden	Winnipeg Jets	AIK IF (Sweden)
167	Tom Ulseth (C)	United States	Minnesota Fighting Saints	University of Wisconsin (WCHA)
168	Wayne Morrin (D)	Canada	Toronto Toros	Kamloops Chiefs (WCHL)
169	Rick St. Croix (G)	Canada	Houston Aeros	Oshawa Generals (OHA)

=== Round 14 ===
#	Player	Nationality	WHA team	College/junior/club team
170	Francois Robert (D)	Canada	Cincinnati Stingers	Sherbrooke Castors (QMJHL)
171	Rick Shinske (C)	Canada	Edmonton Oilers	New Westminster Bruins (WCHL)
172	Darrell Ferner (C)	Canada	Calgary Cowboys	Kamloops Chiefs (WCHL)
173	Henry Taylor (RW)	United States	Minnesota Fighting Saints	St. Paul Vulcans (MidJHL)
174	Dave Hanson (D)	United States	Toronto Toros	Colorado College (WCHA)
175	Paul Jensen (D)	United States	Houston Aeros	Michigan Tech University (WCHA)

== Draftees based on nationality ==
Rank	Country	Amount
	North America	164
1	Canada	144
2	United States	20
	Europe	11
3	Sweden	5
4	Finland	3
5	Austria	2
6	Latvia	1

== See also ==
- 1975 NHL Amateur Draft
- 1975–76 WHA season

Preceded by 1974 WHA amateur draft	WHA Draft; 1975	Succeeded by 1976 WHA amateur draft
