= Claude Larose (ice hockey, born 1955) =

Canadian ice hockey player

- Born: May 17, 1955 (age 71) Saint-Jean-sur-Richelieu, Quebec, Canada
- Height: 5 ft 10 in (178 cm)
- Weight: 175 lb (79 kg; 12 st 7 lb)
- Position: Left wing
- Shot: Left
- Played for: Cincinnati Stingers; Indianapolis Racers; New York Rangers
- NHL draft: 120th overall, 1975; New York Rangers
- WHA draft: 1st overall, 1975; Cincinnati Stingers
- Playing career: 1975–1986; 1996–1998

Claude Andre Larose (born May 17, 1955) is a Canadian former professional ice hockey winger.

== Career ==
Larose was drafted first overall in the 1975 WHA Amateur Draft and played 252 games in the World Hockey Association (WHA) for the Cincinnati Stingers and Indianapolis Racers.

After the dissolution of the WHA, he played 25 games for the New York Rangers of the National Hockey League. In 1983–84, he won the John B. Sollenberger Trophy for leading the AHL in scoring. He ultimately retired in 1998 after playing a few seasons for the Windsor Papetiers of the LNAH.

== Career statistics ==
			Regular season					Playoffs
Season	Team	League	GP	G	A	Pts	PIM	GP	G	A	Pts	PIM
1971–72	Drummondville Rangers	QMJHL	61	9	10	19	2	9	0	2	2	0
1972–73	Drummondville Rangers	QMJHL	61	63	50	113	12	—	—	—	—	—
1973–74	Drummondville Rangers	QMJHL	70	56	77	133	16	—	—	—	—	—
1974–75	Shawinigan Dynamos	QMJHL	35	29	31	60	6	—	—	—	—	—
1974–75	Sherbrooke Castors	QMJHL	39	40	44	84	4	13	12	16	28	2
1974–75	Sherbrooke Castors	MC	—	—	—	—	—	3	5	3	8	2
1975–76	Cincinnati Stingers	WHA	79	28	24	52	19	—	—	—	—	—
1976–77	Cincinnati Stingers	WHA	81	30	46	76	8	4	2	1	3	0
1977–78	Cincinnati Stingers	WHA	51	11	20	31	6	—	—	—	—	—
1977–78	Indianapolis Racers	WHA	28	14	16	30	12	—	—	—	—	—
1978–79	Indianapolis Racers	WHA	13	5	8	13	0	—	—	—	—	—
1978–79	New Haven Nighthawks	AHL	42	25	25	50	7	10	7	5	12	2
1979–80	New York Rangers	NHL	25	4	7	11	2	—	—	—	—	—
1979–80	New Haven Nighthawks	AHL	31	16	27	43	4	—	—	—	—	—
1980–81	New Haven Nighthawks	AHL	80	30	27	57	12	4	1	2	3	0
1981–82	Springfield Indians	AHL	76	30	36	66	12	—	—	—	—	—
1981–82	New York Rangers	NHL	—	—	—	—	—	2	0	0	0	0
1982–83	EHC Wetzikon	CHE II	—	44	17	61	—	—	—	—	—	—
1983–84	Sherbrooke Jets	AHL	80	53	67	120	6	—	—	—	—	—
1984–85	Sherbrooke Canadiens	AHL	77	36	43	79	4	17	10	6	16	8
1985–86	Sherbrooke Canadiens	AHL	65	38	39	77	2	—	—	—	—	—
1996–97	Windsor Papetiers	QSPHL	29	25	19	44	14	—	—	—	—	—
1997–98	Windsor Papetiers	QSPHL	35	20	29	49	4	—	—	—	—	—
WHA totals			252	88	114	202	45	4	2	1	3	0
AHL totals			451	228	264	492	47	31	18	13	31	10
NHL totals			25	4	7	11	2	2	0	0	0	0

Preceded by Pat Price	WHA First Overall Draft Pick; 1975	Succeeded by Blair Chapman
Preceded by Don Larway	Cincinnati Stingers first round draft pick 1975	Succeeded by Peter Marsh
