= Paul Woods (ice hockey) =

Canadian ice hockey player (born 1955)

- Born: April 12, 1955 (age 71) Hespeler, Ontario, Canada
- Height: 5 ft 8 in (173 cm)
- Weight: 175 lb (79 kg; 12 st 7 lb)
- Position: Left wing
- Shot: Left
- Played for: Detroit Red Wings; Adirondack Red Wings; Nova Scotia Voyageurs; Sault Ste. Marie Greyhounds
- NHL draft: 51st overall, 1975; Montreal Canadiens
- WHA draft: 84th overall, 1975; Toronto Toros
- Playing career: 1977–1984

Paul William Woods (born April 12, 1955) is a Canadian former professional ice hockey player who played for the Detroit Red Wings of the National Hockey League (NHL) from 1977 through 1984.

Woods has been the color commentator for Detroit Red Wings radio broadcasts since the 1987-1988 season, retiring on April 15, 2026.

== Career ==
Woods was born in Hespeler, Ontario. As a youth, he played in the 1966 Quebec International Pee-Wee Hockey Tournament with a minor ice hockey team from Hespeler. Woods spent his junior career with the Sault Ste. Marie Greyhounds, leading the team in scoring in 1974-75 with 121 points in 62 games. He was drafted in the 3rd round (51st overall) of the 1975 NHL Entry Draft by the Montreal Canadiens. Woods won two AHL Calder Cup titles with Montreal's farm team, the Nova Scotia Voyageurs in 1975–76 and 1976–77, scoring the Cup winning goal in 1976. After two seasons in Nova Scotia, he was claimed by Detroit in the 1977 NHL Waiver Draft. His entire NHL career would be spent with Detroit.

Woods was the youngest captain in team history prior to Steve Yzerman. He scored 19 goals in his rookie season and settled into a role as a defensive forward, shutting down the opposition's top players. This was a role he embraced, and Woods' work ethic and speed made him a fan favorite in Detroit. His career was shortened due to a hip injury, finishing his NHL career with 72 goals and 124 assists in 502 games played.

Woods finished his pro career with the AHL's Adirondack Red Wings in 1984–85.

In 1987, Woods began a career as the color commentator for the Detroit Red Wings radio broadcasts. On October 17, 2022, he called his 3,000th game. He is the longest-serving radio color commentator in Detroit sports history. In December 2027 Wood will be inducted into the Michigan Sports Hall of Fame.

== Career statistics ==
=== Regular season and playoffs ===
			Regular season					Playoffs
Season	Team	League	GP	G	A	Pts	PIM	GP	G	A	Pts	PIM
1972–73	Sault Ste. Marie Greyhounds	OHA-Jr.	60	30	34	64	65	—	—	—	—	—
1973–74	Sault Ste. Marie Greyhounds	OHA-Jr.	48	17	32	49	91	—	—	—	—	—
1974–75	Sault Ste. Marie Greyhounds	OMJHL	62	38	81	119	116	—	—	—	—	—
1975–76	Nova Scotia Voyageurs	AHL	67	17	21	38	38	9	2	1	3	0
1976–77	Nova Scotia Voyageurs	AHL	45	20	18	38	51	12	1	3	4	6
1977–78	Detroit Red Wings	NHL	80	19	23	42	52	7	0	5	5	4
1978–79	Detroit Red Wings	NHL	80	14	23	37	59	—	—	—	—	—
1979–80	Detroit Red Wings	NHL	79	6	20	26	24	—	—	—	—	—
1980–81	Detroit Red Wings	NHL	67	8	16	24	45	—	—	—	—	—
1981–82	Detroit Red Wings	NHL	75	10	17	27	48	—	—	—	—	—
1982–83	Detroit Red Wings	NHL	63	13	20	33	30	—	—	—	—	—
1983–84	Detroit Red Wings	NHL	57	2	5	7	18	—	—	—	—	—
1984–85	Adirondack Red Wings	AHL	26	2	11	13	8	—	—	—	—	—
NHL totals			501	72	124	196	276	7	0	5	5	4

=== International ===
Year	Team	Event	GP	G	A	Pts	PIM
1979	Canada	WC	8	0	0	0	2

Preceded by Dennis Hextall	Detroit Red Wings captain 1979 with Nick Libett	Succeeded by Dale McCourt
