= Alec Tidey =

Canadian ice hockey player

- Born: January 5, 1955 (age 70); Vancouver, British Columbia, Canada
- Height: 6 ft 0 in (183 cm)
- Weight: 180 lb (82 kg; 12 st 12 lb)
- Position: Right wing
- Shot: Right
- Played for: Buffalo Sabres; Edmonton Oilers; San Diego Mariners
- NHL draft: 143rd overall, 1975; Buffalo Sabres
- WHA draft: 85th overall, 1975; San Diego Mariners
- Playing career: 1975–1981

Alec Mansfield Tidey (born January 5, 1955) is a former professional ice hockey right wing. He was drafted in the eighth round, 143rd overall, by the Buffalo Sabres in the 1975 NHL Amateur Draft. He was also drafted by the San Diego Mariners (sixth round, 85th overall) in the 1975 WHA Amateur Draft, and he began his professional career in the World Hockey Association with San Diego. He then moved to the National Hockey League, playing four games in two seasons with the Sabres and five in 1979–80 with the Edmonton Oilers.

In his NHL career, Tidey appeared in nine games, going scoreless. He played in seventy-four games in his one WHA season, scoring sixteen goals and adding eleven assists.

== Career statistics ==
=== Regular season and playoffs ===
			Regular season					Playoffs
Season	Team	League	GP	G	A	Pts	PIM	GP	G	A	Pts	PIM
1972–73	Vancouver Nats	WCHL	1	0	1	1	0	—	—	—	—	—
1973–74	Kamloops Chiefs	WCHL	64	10	12	22	52	—	—	—	—	—
1974–75	Lethbridge Broncos	WCHL	68	42	54	96	78	6	4	2	6	0
1975–76	San Diego Mariners	WHA	74	16	11	27	46	11	3	6	9	10
1976–77	Buffalo Sabres	NHL	3	0	0	0	0	2	0	0	0	0
1976–77	Hershey Bears	AHL	74	25	38	63	55	6	1	5	6	4
1977–78	Buffalo Sabres	NHL	1	0	0	0	0	—	—	—	—	—
1977–78	Hershey Bears	AHL	49	14	19	33	36	—	—	—	—	—
1978–79	Hershey Bears	AHL	79	31	30	61	60	4	1	0	1	0
1979–80	Rochester Americans	AHL	9	2	3	5	6	—	—	—	—	—
1979–80	Edmonton Oilers	NHL	5	0	0	0	8	—	—	—	—	—
1979–80	Cincinnati Stingers	CHL	10	3	2	5	10	—	—	—	—	—
1979–80	Houston Apollos	CHL	40	20	29	49	29	6	5	4	9	6
1980–81	Houston Apollos	CHL	17	9	8	17	12	—	—	—	—	—
1980–81	Springfield Falcons	AHL	30	9	7	16	34	5	1	1	2	0
WHA totals			74	16	11	27	46	11	3	6	9	10
NHL totals			9	0	0	0	8	2	0	0	0	0
