= Alex Forsyth (ice hockey) =

Canadian ice hockey player (1955–2024)

- Born: January 6, 1955 Galt, Ontario, Canada
- Died: July 12, 2024 (aged 69) Kingston, Ontario, Canada
- Height: 6 ft 2 in (188 cm)
- Weight: 195 lb (88 kg; 13 st 13 lb)
- Position: Centre
- Shot: Left
- Played for: Washington Capitals
- NHL draft: 18th overall, 1975; Washington Capitals
- WHA draft: 122nd overall, 1975; San Diego Mariners
- Playing career: 1975–1978

James Alexander Forsyth (January 6, 1955 – July 12, 2024) was a Canadian professional ice hockey forward. He played one game in the National Hockey League (NHL) with the Washington Capitals during the 1976–77 season, on November 12, 1976 against the Chicago Black Hawks. He was selected by the Capitals 18th overall in the 1975 NHL entry draft and by the San Diego Mariners of the World Hockey Association in the ninth round of the 1975 WHA Amateur Draft, from the Kingston Canadians of the Ontario Major Junior Hockey League.

After retirement, Forsyth returned to Kingston, and became a police officer, spending 33 years with Kingston Police Force.

Forsyth died on July 12, 2024.

== Career statistics ==
=== Regular season and playoffs ===
			Regular season					Playoffs
Season	Team	League	GP	G	A	Pts	PIM	GP	G	A	Pts	PIM
1972–73	London Knights	OHA	2	0	0	0	0	—	—	—	—	—
1973–74	Kingston Canadians	OHA	58	11	11	22	17	—	—	—	—	—
1974–75	Kingston Canadians	OMJHL	64	27	31	58	72	8	6	4	10	2
1975–76	Richmond Robins	AHL	71	7	16	23	24	8	2	5	7	0
1976–77	Washington Capitals	NHL	1	0	0	0	0	—	—	—	—	—
1976–77	Springfield Indians	AHL	74	14	33	47	47	—	—	—	—	—
1977–78	Tulsa Oilers	CHL	69	15	16	31	29	7	0	0	0	0
AHL totals			145	21	49	70	71	8	2	5	7	0
NHL totals			1	0	0	0	0	—	—	—	—	—

== See also ==
- List of players who played only one game in the NHL

Preceded by Greg Joly	Washington Capitals first-round draft pick 1975	Succeeded by Rick Green
