= Don Cairns =

Canadian ice hockey player

- Born: October 8, 1955 (age 69); Red Deer, Alberta, Canada
- Height: 5 ft 9 in (175 cm)
- Weight: 190 lb (86 kg; 13 st 8 lb)
- Position: Left wing
- Shot: Left
- Played for: Kansas City Scouts; Colorado Rockies
- NHL draft: 20th overall, 1975; Kansas City Scouts
- WHA draft: 17th overall, 1975; Michigan Stags
- Playing career: 1975–1978

Donald Cairns (born October 8, 1955) is a Canadian former professional ice hockey player. He played 9 games in the National Hockey League (NHL) for the Kansas City Scouts and Colorado Rockies between 1975 and 1977, as well as several years in various minor leagues during his career, which lasted from 1975 to 1978. Selected by the Scouts in the 1975 NHL Amateur Draft and the Michigan Stags of the World Hockey Association in the 1975 WHA Amateur Draft, Cairns signed with the Scouts and made his NHL debut that year, playing 7 games in the NHL and 33 in and the minor leagues. He played a further 2 NHL games the following year with Colorado, where the Scouts had relocated to, again spending time in the minors, and briefly played one further season before retiring in 1978.

== Early life ==
Cairns was born in Red Deer, Alberta and was raised in the neighbourhood of Fairview and went to Lord Beaverbrook High School in south Calgary.

== Pro hockey career ==
Cairns was drafted by the Kansas City Scouts in the second round of the 1975 NHL Amateur Draft. He was also selected by the Michigan Stags in the second round of the World Hockey Association (WHA) Amateur Draft in that same year.

Despite having a respectable minor career his professional one was short lived he bounced around the minors and got called up playing just seven games in the National Hockey League wearing jersey #20 for the Kansas City Scouts. He would end up playing two more games for the Rockies after the Scouts moved after poor season ticket sales in Kansas City.

In Colorado, Cairns would attain his only NHL point, an assist. He retired from hockey after the 1977–1978 season.

== Career statistics ==
=== Regular season and playoffs ===
			Regular season					Playoffs
Season	Team	League	GP	G	A	Pts	PIM	GP	G	A	Pts	PIM
1973–74	Calgary Canucks	AJHL	54	30	31	61	180	—	—	—	—	—
1974–75	Victoria Cougars	WCHL	68	32	37	69	214	12	5	4	9	10
1975–76	Kansas City Scouts	NHL	7	0	0	0	0	—	—	—	—	—
1975–76	Springfield Indians	AHL	15	4	2	6	13	—	—	—	—	—
1975–76	Port Huron Flags	IHL	18	6	8	14	13	15	3	8	11	19
1976–77	Colorado Rockies	NHL	2	0	1	1	0	—	—	—	—	—
1976–77	Flint Generals	IHL	10	3	5	8	13	—	—	—	—	—
1976–77	Oklahoma City Blazers	CHL	21	1	2	3	34	—	—	—	—	—
1977–78	Phoenix Roadrunners	CHL	9	1	3	4	2	—	—	—	—	—
NHL totals			9	0	1	1	2	—	—	—	—	—
