= Pierre Giroux =

Canadian ice hockey player

- Born: November 17, 1955 (age 69); Hawkesbury, Ontario, Canada
- Height: 6 ft 0 in (183 cm)
- Weight: 190 lb (86 kg; 13 st 8 lb)
- Position: Left wing
- Shot: Left
- Played for: Los Angeles Kings
- NHL draft: 61st overall, 1975; Chicago Black Hawks
- WHA draft: 44th overall, 1975; Quebec Nordiques
- Playing career: 1975–1984

Pierre Yves Giroux (born November 17, 1955) is a Canadian former professional ice hockey left winger. He was drafted by the Chicago Black Hawks in the fourth round, 61st overall, of the 1975 NHL Amateur Draft. He played six games in the National Hockey League with the Los Angeles Kings during the 1982–83 season. He was also drafted by the Quebec Nordiques of the World Hockey Association; however, he never played in that league.

Giroux was born in Hawkesbury, Ontario and raised in Brownsburg, Quebec.

== Career statistics ==
=== Regular season and playoffs ===
| | | | Regular season | | | | | Playoffs |
| Season | Team | League | GP | G | A | Pts | PIM | GP | G | A | Pts | PIM |
|---|---|---|---|---|---|---|---|---|---|---|---|---|
| 1972–73 | Sorel Eperviers | QMJHL | 49 | 4 | 13 | 17 | 25 | 10 | 1 | 2 | 3 | 7 |
| 1973–74 | Sorel Eperviers | QMJHL | 42 | 4 | 11 | 15 | 23 | 14 | 4 | 11 | 15 | 5 |
| 1974–75 | Sorel Eperviers | QMJHL | 29 | 26 | 24 | 50 | 46 | — | — | — | — | — |
| 1974–75 | Hull Festivals | QMJHL | 46 | 31 | 37 | 68 | 79 | 4 | 1 | 3 | 4 | 0 |
| 1975–76 | Dallas Black Hawks | CHL | 62 | 8 | 14 | 22 | 69 | 10 | 0 | 1 | 1 | 0 |
| 1976–77 | Flint Generals | IHL | 73 | 21 | 36 | 57 | 87 | 5 | 2 | 0 | 2 | 0 |
| 1977–78 | Flint Generals | IHL | 40 | 25 | 23 | 48 | 121 | 5 | 0 | 0 | 0 | 56 |
| 1977–78 | Dallas Black Hawks | CHL | 16 | 2 | 5 | 7 | 2 | — | — | — | — | — |
| 1978–79 | Flint Generals | IHL | 70 | 41 | 42 | 83 | 146 | 11 | 4 | 9 | 13 | 9 |
| 1978–79 | New Brunswick Hawks | AHL | 8 | 0 | 2 | 2 | 20 | — | — | — | — | — |
| 1979–80 | Flint Generals | IHL | 80 | 33 | 38 | 71 | 197 | 5 | 2 | 1 | 3 | 16 |
| 1980–81 | Flint Generals | IHL | 81 | 55 | 47 | 102 | 303 | 7 | 5 | 5 | 10 | 0 |
| 1981–82 | New Haven Nighthawks | AHL | 38 | 6 | 11 | 17 | 114 | 3 | 0 | 1 | 1 | 25 |
| 1982–83 | Los Angeles Kings | NHL | 6 | 1 | 0 | 1 | 17 | — | — | — | — | — |
| 1982–83 | New Haven Nighthawks | AHL | 62 | 16 | 31 | 47 | 337 | 9 | 1 | 3 | 4 | 26 |
| 1983–84 | Flint Generals | IHL | 56 | 24 | 37 | 61 | 274 | — | — | — | — | — |
| IHL totals | | | 400 | 199 | 223 | 422 | 1128 | 33 | 13 | 15 | 28 | 81 |
| NHL totals | | | 6 | 1 | 0 | 1 | 17 | — | — | — | — | — |
