= Jerry Rollins =

Canadian ice hockey player (born 1955)

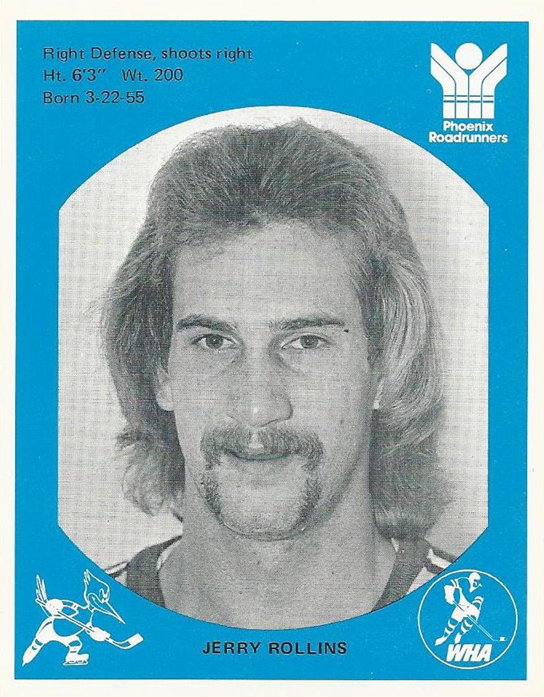
- Rollins in 1976 card
- Born: March 22, 1955 (age 71) New Westminster, BC, CAN
- Height: 6 ft 3 in (191 cm)
- Weight: 200 lb (91 kg; 14 st 4 lb)
- Position: Defence
- Played for: Toronto Toros; Birmingham Bulls; Phoenix Roadrunners; Indianapolis Racers
- NHL draft: 23rd overall, 1975; Detroit Red Wings
- WHA draft: 26th overall, 1975; Toronto Toros
- Playing career: 1975–1979

Jerry Allan Rollins (born March 22, 1955) is a Canadian retired professional ice hockey defenceman. He played in the World Hockey Association (WHA) for the Toronto Toros, Birmingham Bulls, Phoenix Roadrunners, and the Indianapolis Racers. Rollins is the son of former NHL, WHA, and WHL player and coach Al Rollins. After his playing career ended, Rollins became an entrepreneur and settled in San Diego.

== Career statistics ==
			Regular season					Playoffs
Season	Team	League	GP	G	A	Pts	PIM	GP	G	A	Pts	PIM
1972–73	Flin Flon Bombers	WCHL	32	0	3	3	99	—	—	—	—	—
1973–74	Flin Flon Bombers	WCHL	64	4	12	16	338	—	—	—	—	—
1974–75	Flin Flon Bombers	WCHL	9	1	4	5	72	—	—	—	—	—
1974–75	Winnipeg Clubs	WCHL	53	6	17	23	401	—	—	—	—	—
1975–76	Toronto Toros	WHA	52	5	7	12	185	—	—	—	—	—
1976–77	Birmingham Bulls	WHA	8	0	0	0	17	—	—	—	—	—
1976–77	Phoenix Roadrunners	WHA	63	4	10	14	169	—	—	—	—	—
1977–78	Kalamazoo Wings	IHL	12	0	1	1	68	—	—	—	—	—
1977–78	Toledo Goaldiggers	IHL	16	3	4	7	131	—	—	—	—	—
1977–78	Philadelphia Firebirds	AHL	29	2	2	4	73	3	0	0	0	4
1978–79	San Diego Hawks	PHL	39	2	9	11	145	—	—	—	—	—
1978–79	Indianapolis Racers	WHA	7	0	1	1	7	—	—	—	—	—
WHA totals			130	9	18	27	378	—	—	—	—	—
