= Sidney Veysey =

Canadian ice hockey player

- Born: July 30, 1955 (age 69); Woodstock, New Brunswick, Canada
- Height: 5 ft 11 in (180 cm)
- Weight: 175 lb (79 kg; 12 st 7 lb)
- Position: Centre
- Shot: Left
- Played for: NHL; Vancouver Canucks
- NHL draft: 182nd overall, 1975; Vancouver Canucks
- WHA draft: 105th overall, 1975; Edmonton Oilers
- Playing career: 1975–1983

Sidney G. "Sid" Veysey (born July 30, 1955) is a Canadian former professional ice hockey centre who played one game in the National Hockey League, with the Vancouver Canucks on October 14, 1977. The rest of his professional career was spent in the minor leagues, mainly in the Central Hockey League. Selected by the Canucks in the 1975 NHL Amateur Draft, Veysey made his professional debut that year and played hockey until retiring in 1983. He later became a scout for the Saint John Sea Dogs of the major junior Quebec Major Junior Hockey League

== Playing career ==
Veysey was selected 182nd overall in the 1975 NHL Amateur Draft by the Vancouver Canucks. Despite being an 11th-round pick, he would have a strong start to his pro career, being named the IHL Rookie of the Year in 1976, scoring 87 points for the Fort Wayne Komets. The following season, he led the Tulsa Oilers, Vancouver's top minor-pro affiliate in scoring with 80 points. He made his NHL debut on October 14, 1977, but after playing just one game was returned to Tulsa.

After returning to the minors and suffering through a disappointing season in Tulsa which was ruined by shoulder problems, Veysey retired from professional hockey to return to school at the University of New Brunswick, although he continued to play amateur hockey for the school. Following the completion of his degree, he made a brief comeback to pro hockey, suiting up for 17 games in the AHL in 1981–82 before retiring.

== Post-playing career ==
Veysey is now a regional scout for the Saint John Sea Dogs of the Quebec Major Junior Hockey League.

== Career statistics ==
=== Regular season and playoffs ===
			Regular season					Playoffs
Season	Team	League	GP	G	A	Pts	PIM	GP	G	A	Pts	PIM
1971–72	Riverview Reds	NBJHL	26	22	23	45	62	—	—	—	—	—
1972–73	Moncton Beavers	NBJHL	15	15	13	28	52	—	—	—	—	—
1973–74	Moncton Beavers	NBJHL	37	31	77	108	69	8	7	4	11	41
1973–74	Sherbrooke Castors	QMJHL	69	36	44	80	51	5	4	2	6	7
1974–75	Sherbrooke Castors	QMJHL	48	37	53	90	67	13	8	13	21	6
1975–76	Fort Wayne Komets	IHL	73	36	51	87	97	9	7	6	13	14
1975–76	Tulsa Oilers	CHL	1	0	0	0	0	—	—	—	—	—
1976–77	Tulsa Oilers	CHL	76	29	51	80	66	9	1	3	4	4
1977–78	Tulsa Oilers	CHL	54	16	17	33	64	—	—	—	—	—
1977–78	Vancouver Canucks	NHL	1	0	0	0	0	—	—	—	—	—
1978–79	Newcastle Northmen	NNBHL	—	—	—	—	—	—	—	—	—	—
1979–80	University of New Brunswick	CIAU	27	25	28	53	46	—	—	—	—	—
1980–81	University of New Brunswick	CIAU	20	17	20	37	46	2	0	5	5	2
1981–82	Fredericton Capitals	NBSHL	—	—	—	—	—	—	—	—	—	—
1981–82	Fredericton Express	AHL	17	2	10	12	17	—	—	—	—	—
1982–83	Saint John Gulls	NBIHA	24	17	19	36	39	11	4	11	15	18
CHL totals			131	45	68	113	130	9	1	3	4	4
NHL totals			1	0	0	0	0	—	—	—	—	—

== See also ==
- List of players who played only one game in the NHL
