= Florent Fortier =

Canadian ice hockey player

- Born: June 1, 1955 (age 70) Beauport, Quebec, Canada
- Height: 5 ft 9 in (175 cm)
- Weight: 165 lb (75 kg; 11 st 11 lb)
- Position: Forward
- Shot: Left
- Played for: Quebec Nordiques (WHA)
- WHA draft: 137th overall, 1975; Quebec Nordiques
- Playing career: 1975–1977

Florent Fortier (born June 1, 1955) is a Canadian former professional ice hockey forward. He was drafted by the World Hockey Association's Quebec Nordiques in the tenth round, 137th overall, of the 1975 WHA Amateur Draft. He played four games with the Nordiques during the 1975–76 season, scoring one goal and one assist. As a youth, he played in the 1968 Quebec International Pee-Wee Hockey Tournament with a minor ice hockey team in Beauport, Quebec City.

== Career statistics ==
=== Regular season and playoffs ===
| | | | Regular season | | | | | Playoffs |
| Season | Team | League | GP | G | A | Pts | PIM | GP | G | A | Pts | PIM |
|---|---|---|---|---|---|---|---|---|---|---|---|---|
| 1972–73 | Quebec Remparts | QMJHL | 8 | 0 | 0 | 0 | 2 | 1 | 0 | 0 | 0 | 0 |
| 1972–73 | Ste. Foy Couillard | QJAHL | Statistics Unavailable |
| 1973–74 | Quebec Remparts | QMJHL | 56 | 15 | 24 | 39 | 60 | 16 | 0 | 5 | 5 | 12 |
| 1974–75 | Quebec Remparts | QMJHL | 71 | 15 | 35 | 50 | 182 | 4 | 1 | 2 | 3 | 46 |
| 1975–76 | Quebec Nordiques | WHA | 4 | 1 | 1 | 2 | 0 | 1 | 0 | 0 | 0 | 0 |
| 1975–76 | Maine Nordiques | NAHL | 39 | 5 | 17 | 22 | 88 | 4 | 1 | 0 | 1 | 5 |
| 1976–77 | Maine Nordiques | NAHL | 12 | 1 | 5 | 6 | 2 | — | — | — | — | — |
| WHA totals | | | 4 | 1 | 1 | 2 | 0 | 1 | 0 | 0 | 0 | 0 |
