= Rick Bourbonnais =

Canadian retired ice hockey right winger

- Born: April 20, 1955 (age 70) Toronto, Ontario, Canada
- Height: 6 ft 0 in (183 cm)
- Weight: 186 lb (84 kg; 13 st 4 lb)
- Position: Right wing
- Shot: Right
- Played for: St. Louis Blues; Chamonix HC; Sportbund DJK Rosenheim; Innsbrucker EV
- NHL draft: 63rd overall, 1975; St. Louis Blues
- WHA draft: 48th overall, 1975; Michigan Stags
- Playing career: 1975–1989

Richard Ronald Bourbonnais (born April 20, 1955) is a Canadian retired ice hockey right winger. He played 71 games in the National Hockey League with the St. Louis Blues from 1975 to 1978. The rest of his career, which lasted from 1975 to 1989, was spent in the minor leagues and then in Europe.

== Playing career ==
Bourbonnais played junior hockey in the Ontario Hockey Association for the Kitchener Rangers and the Ottawa 67's. He was selected 63rd overall by the St. Louis Blues in the 1975 NHL Amateur Draft from the 67's and played 75 games for the Blues across three seasons from 1975 to 1978. He was also drafted 48th overall by the Michigan Stags of the World Hockey Association in the 1975 WHA Amateur Draft though he never played in that league.

Bourbonnais also played in the American Hockey League for the Providence Reds and Binghamton Dusters and the Central Hockey League for the Kansas City Blues and the Salt Lake Golden Eagles. He then moved to Europe in 1981, playing in France for Chamonix HC, Germany for Sportbund DJK Rosenheim and in Austria for Innsbrucker EV before moving to the German lower leagues.

== Career statistics ==
=== Regular season and playoffs ===
| | | | Regular season | | | | | Playoffs |
| Season | Team | League | GP | G | A | Pts | PIM | GP | G | A | Pts | PIM |
|---|---|---|---|---|---|---|---|---|---|---|---|---|
| 1972–73 | Kitchener Rangers | OHA | 56 | 7 | 13 | 20 | 53 | 4 | 1 | 1 | 2 | 0 |
| 1973–74 | Kitchener Rangers | OHA | 70 | 30 | 35 | 65 | 40 | 7 | 1 | 2 | 3 | 6 |
| 1974–75 | Ottawa 67's | OMJHL | 64 | 21 | 37 | 58 | 79 | 7 | 1 | 2 | 3 | 6 |
| 1975–76 | St. Louis Blues | NHL | 7 | 0 | 0 | 0 | 8 | — | — | — | — | — |
| 1975–76 | Providence Reds | AHL | 64 | 18 | 17 | 35 | 96 | 2 | 1 | 0 | 1 | 6 |
| 1976–77 | St. Louis Blues | NHL | 33 | 6 | 8 | 14 | 10 | 4 | 0 | 1 | 1 | 0 |
| 1976–77 | Kansas City Blades | CHL | 39 | 20 | 24 | 44 | 19 | — | — | — | — | — |
| 1977–78 | St. Louis Blues | NHL | 31 | 3 | 7 | 10 | 11 | — | — | — | — | — |
| 1977–78 | Salt Lake Golden Eagles | CHL | 40 | 18 | 21 | 39 | 12 | 6 | 3 | 2 | 5 | 2 |
| 1978–79 | Salt Lake Golden Eagles | CHL | 74 | 15 | 22 | 37 | 35 | 4 | 0 | 0 | 0 | 2 |
| 1979–80 | Binghamton Dusters | AHL | 49 | 8 | 11 | 19 | 20 | — | — | — | — | — |
| 1979–80 | Salt Lake Golden Eagles | CHL | 6 | 1 | 0 | 1 | 0 | — | — | — | — | — |
| 1981–82 | Chamonix HC | FRA | 32 | 15 | 13 | 28 | 26 | — | — | — | — | — |
| 1982–83 | Sportbund DJK Rosenheim | GER | 36 | 31 | 31 | 62 | 26 | — | — | — | — | — |
| 1983–84 | Sportbund DJK Rosenheim | GER | 29 | 13 | 14 | 27 | 8 | — | — | — | — | — |
| 1984–85 | Innsbrucker EV | AUT | 5 | 2 | 2 | 4 | 6 | — | — | — | — | — |
| 1984–85 | EHC Dübendorf | NLB | 3 | — | — | — | — | — | — | — | — | — |
| 1984–85 | EA Kempten | GER-2 | 15 | 22 | 7 | 29 | 20 | 12 | 16 | 17 | 33 | 50 |
| 1985–86 | EA Kempten | GER-2 | 28 | 30 | 19 | 49 | 46 | — | — | — | — | — |
| 1986–87 | Deggendorfer EC | GER-3 | 14 | 19 | 14 | 33 | 32 | — | — | — | — | — |
| 1988–89 | EA Kempten | GER-4 | 32 | 34 | 41 | 75 | 30 | — | — | — | — | — |
| NHL totals | | | 71 | 9 | 15 | 24 | 29 | 4 | 0 | 1 | 1 | 0 |
