= Byron Shutt =

Canadian ice hockey player

- Born: October 26, 1955 (age 70) Toronto, Ontario, Canada
- Height: 6 ft 1 in (185 cm)
- Weight: 195 lb (88 kg; 13 st 13 lb)
- Position: Left wing
- Shot: Left
- Played for: Cincinnati Stingers
- NHL draft: 155th overall, 1975; Pittsburgh Penguins
- WHA draft: 97th overall, 1975; Toronto Toros
- Playing career: 1978–1983

Byron Shutt (born October 26, 1955) is a Canadian former professional ice hockey player who played in the World Hockey Association (WHA). Drafted in the ninth round of the 1975 NHL Amateur Draft by the Pittsburgh Penguins, Shutt opted to play in the WHA after being selected by the Toronto Toros in the seventh round of the 1975 WHA Amateur Draft. He played for the Cincinnati Stingers during the 1978–79 WHA season. He is the younger brother of Hockey Hall of Famer Steve Shutt.

As a youth, he played in the 1968 Quebec International Pee-Wee Hockey Tournament with the Toronto Shopsy's minor ice hockey team. Shutt played junior ice hockey with the North York Rangers, before attending Bowling Green State University for four years. Drafted in 1975 by teams in the NHL and WHA, Shutt decided instead to remain at Bowling Green. In 1978, Shutt signed as a free agent with the Cincinnati Stingers, playing one season with the team and its affiliate Springfield Indians of the American Hockey League. The following season, the WHA folded and his rights were claimed by the Hartford Whalers in the WHA dispersal draft. The Whalers took over the affiliation with the Indians and formed a Cincinnati Stingers team in the Central Hockey League, and Shutt played for both teams in the 1979–80 season. In 1980, Shutt joined the Flint Generals of the International Hockey League (IHL), where he racked up 235 penalty minutes. Shutt played one more season of professional hockey in 1982–83 with the Saginaw Gears of the IHL before retiring.

After retiring from hockey, Shutt operated a landscaping firm and coached hockey for Bay High School in Ohio.

== Career statistics ==
			Regular season					Playoffs
Season	Team	League	GP	G	A	Pts	PIM	GP	G	A	Pts	PIM
1973–74	North York Rangers	OPJAHL	43	8	15	23	90	—	—	—	—	—
1974–75	Bowling Green University	NCAA	27	10	15	25	61	—	—	—	—	—
1975–76	Bowling Green University	NCAA	32	14	14	28	76	—	—	—	—	—
1976–77	Bowling Green University	NCAA	38	14	27	41	123	—	—	—	—	—
1977–78	Bowling Green University	NCAA	39	12	31	43	106	—	—	—	—	—
1978–79	Springfield Indians	AHL	6	0	0	0	2	—	—	—	—	—
1978–79	Cincinnati Stingers	WHA	65	10	7	17	115	3	1	1	2	14
1979–80	Springfield Indians	AHL	58	8	16	24	109	—	—	—	—	—
1979–80	Cincinnati Stingers	CHL	23	8	6	14	42	—	—	—	—	—
1980–81	Flint Generals	IHL	63	11	22	33	235	7	0	2	2	10
1982–83	Saginaw Gears	IHL	73	26	46	72	185	—	—	—	—	—
WHA totals			65	10	7	17	115	3	1	1	2	14

== Awards and honours ==
Award	Year
All-CCHA Second team	1977–78

- 1976–77 CCHA All-Star Honorable Mention
