= Danny Arndt =

Canadian ice hockey player (b. 1955)

- Born: March 26, 1955 (age 70) Saskatoon, Saskatchewan, Canada
- Height: 5 ft 10 in (178 cm)
- Weight: 170 lb (77 kg; 12 st 2 lb)
- Position: Left wing
- Shot: Left
- Played for: New England Whalers; Edmonton Oilers; Birmingham Bulls
- NHL draft: 25th overall, 1975; Chicago Black Hawks
- WHA draft: 28th overall, 1975; New England Whalers
- Playing career: 1975–1978

Daniel Henry Arndt (born March 26, 1955) is a Canadian former professional ice hockey left winger.

== Career ==
Arndt was selected in the second round of the 1975 NHL Amateur Draft, 35th overall, by the Chicago Blackhawks, as well as in the second round of the 1975 WHA Amateur Draft, 28th overall, by the New England Whalers. He played parts of three seasons in the WHA, primarily with the Whalers, and also played briefly for the Edmonton Oilers and the Birmingham Bulls. He also represented Canada at the 1975 World Junior Ice Hockey Championships, where Canada won the silver medal.

After retiring in 1978, Arndt proceeded to become an elementary school gym teacher in Saskatoon.

== Career statistics ==
			Regular season					Playoffs
Season	Team	League	GP	G	A	Pts	PIM	GP	G	A	Pts	PIM
1971–72	Saskatoon Blades	WCHL	4	5	0	5	0	6	0	3	3	0
1972–73	Saskatoon Blades	WCHL	68	38	21	59	4	7	3	2	5	0
1973–74	Saskatoon Blades	WCHL	68	42	39	81	33	6	4	2	6	6
1974–75	Saskatoon Blades	WCHL	57	44	34	78	19	17	9	8	17	0
1975–76	New England Whalers	WHA	69	8	8	16	10	8	0	0	0	0
1975–76	Cape Cod Codders	NAHL-Sr.	7	0	2	2	2	—	—	—	—	—
1976–77	Edmonton Oilers	WHA	1	0	0	0	0	—	—	—	—	—
1976–77	New England Whalers	WHA	46	8	14	22	11	—	—	—	—	—
1976–77	Rhode Island Reds	AHL	27	4	8	12	8	—	—	—	—	—
1977–78	Birmingham Bulls	WHA	4	0	1	1	0	—	—	—	—	—
1977–78	Springfield Indians	AHL	7	4	1	5	2	—	—	—	—	—
1977–78	Hampton Gulls	AHL	40	20	18	38	10	—	—	—	—	—
WHA totals			120	16	23	39	21	8	0	0	0	0
