= Nick Sanza =

Canadian ice hockey player (born 1955)

- Born: February 6, 1955 (age 71) LaSalle, Quebec, Canada
- Height: 5 ft 10 in (178 cm)
- Weight: 174 lb (79 kg; 12 st 6 lb)
- Position: Goaltender
- Caught: Left
- Played for: Denver Spurs; Ottawa Civics; HC Asiago; Milan Devils
- National team: Italy
- NHL draft: 150th overall, 1975; Atlanta Flames
- WHA draft: 64th overall, 1975; Denver Spurs
- Playing career: 1976–1991

Nick Sanza (born February 6, 1955) is a Canadian retired professional ice hockey goaltender.

== Playing career ==
Sanza played major junior in the Quebec Major Junior Hockey League (QMJHL) for three seasons with the Montreal Red White and Blue and Sherbrooke Beavers. He set a league record for most shutouts in a single season with seven in 1974–75 (later tied by Roberto Luongo and Adam Russo). He joined the North American Hockey League in 1975–76 and played with the Erie Blades and Beauce Jaros.

Sanza turned pro in 1975–76 with the Tucson Mavericks of the Central Hockey League (CHL). Having been drafted 64th overall by the Denver Spurs in the 1975 WHA Amateur Draft, he joined the club in 1975-76. He had also been drafted 150th overall in the 1975 NHL entry draft by the Atlanta Flames, but he never played a game in the NHL.

In 1976-77, Sanza returned to the minor leagues with the Greensboro Generals of the SHL. Two seasons later, he enrolled at the University of Alberta and played in the Canadian university circuit. In 1987-88, he went overseas to play in the Italian Serie A with HC Asiago and later with the Milan Devils.

== Career statistics ==
			Regular season									Playoffs
Season	Team	League	GP	W	L	T	MIN	GA	SO	GAA	SV%	GP	W	L	MIN	GA	SO	GAA	SV%
1971–72	Montreal Junior Canadiens	OHA	47	—	—	—	—	233	0	4.87	—	—	—	—	—	—	—	—	—
1972–73	Montreal Red White and Blue	QMJHL	53	—	—	—	1952	268	0	5.04	—	4	—	—	—	—	—	—	—
1973–74	Montreal Red White and Blue	QMJHL	39	—	—	—	—	179	2	4.63	—	9	—	—	—	—	—	—	—
1974–75	Sherbrooke Castors	QMJHL	66	—	—	—	3481	225	7	3.51	—	13	—	—	—	—	—	—	—
1975–76	Beauce Jaros	NAHL	5	1	2	0	239	22	0	5.53	—	1	—	—	—	—	—	—	—
1975–76	Tucson Mavericks	CHL	5	0	3	1	247	22	0	5.34	—	—	—	—	—	—	—	—	—
1975–76	Denver Spurs/Ottawa Civics	WHA	1	—	—	—	20	5	0	15.00	.583	—	—	—	—	—	—	—	—
1976–77	Greensboro Generals	SHL	13	3	7	1	592	40	0	4.05	.887	—	—	—	—	—	—	—	—
1978–79	University of Alberta	CWUAA	25	14	5	1	1213	69	0	3.41	.861	—	—	—	—	—	—	—	—
1986–87	Asiago HC	Italy-A	42	—	—	—	—	—	—	—	—	—	—	—	—	—	—	—	—
1987–88	Asiago HC	Italy-A	36	—	—	—	—	—	—	—	—	—	—	—	—	—	—	—	—
1990–91	Milan Devils	Italy-A	4	—	—	—	—	—	—	—	—	—	—	—	—	—	—	—	—
1991–92	Milan Devils	Italy-A	8	—	—	—	—	—	—	—	—	—	—	—	—	—	—	—	—
WHA totals			1	—	—	—	20	5	0	15.00	.583	—	—	—	—	—	—	—	—
