= Bob Russell (ice hockey) =

Canadian ice hockey player

- Born: February 5, 1955 (age 71) Toronto, Ontario, Canada
- Height: 5 ft 9 in (175 cm)
- Weight: 167 lb (76 kg; 11 st 13 lb)
- Position: Centre
- Shot: Left
- Played for: Edmonton Oilers
- NHL draft: 105th overall, 1975; Los Angeles Kings
- WHA draft: 117th overall, 1975; Edmonton Oilers
- Playing career: 1975–1978

Robert Russell (born February 5, 1955) is a Canadian former professional ice hockey player.

== Early life ==
Russell was born in Toronto, Ontario. As a youth, he played in the 1967 Quebec International Pee-Wee Hockey Tournament with the Toronto Faustina minor ice hockey team.

== Career ==
Russell is an alumnus of the Sudbury Wolves and was a member of their first-ever Ontario Hockey League team in 1972. He was selected in the sixth Round, 105th overall, in the 1975 NHL Amateur Draft by the Los Angeles Kings. He was also drafted in the ninth round, 117th overall in the 1975 WHA Amateur Draft by the Edmonton Oilers. He played two seasons in the World Hockey Association with the Edmonton Oilers. He is the current president of the Greater Metro Junior A Hockey League.

== Statistics ==
			Regular season					Playoffs
Season	Team	League	GP	G	A	Pts	PIM	GP	G	A	Pts	PIM
1972–73	Sudbury Wolves	OHA	61	16	15	31	34	--	--	--	--	--
1973–74	Sudbury Wolves	OHA	67	41	29	70	79	--	--	--	--	--
1974–75	Sudbury Wolves	OHA	69	51	54	105	18	--	--	--	--	--
1975–76	Greensboro Generals	SHL	19	11	9	20	4	--	--	--	--	--
1975–76	Edmonton Oilers	WHA	58	13	18	31	19	4	1	0	1	0
1976–77	Edmonton Oilers	WHA	57	7	6	13	41	1	0	0	0	0
1977–78	Transcona Chargers	CSHL	--	16	17	33	20	--	--	--	--	--
WHA Totals			115	20	24	44	60	5	1	0	1	0
