= Blair Davidson =

Canadian ice hockey player (born 1955)

- Born: April 10, 1955 (age 71) Cartwright, Manitoba, Canada
- Height: 5 ft 11 in (180 cm)
- Weight: 180 lb (82 kg; 12 st 12 lb)
- Position: Defence
- Shot: Left
- Played for: Phoenix Roadrunners
- NHL draft: 45th overall, 1975; Detroit Red Wings
- WHA draft: 39th overall, 1975; Phoenix Roadrunners
- Playing career: 1975–1980

Blair Murray Davidson (born April 10, 1955) is a Canadian former professional ice hockey player who played in the World Hockey Association (WHA). Drafted in the third round of the 1975 NHL Amateur Draft by the Detroit Red Wings, Davidson opted to play in the WHA after being selected by the Phoenix Roadrunners in the third round of the 1975 WHA Amateur Draft. He played in two games for the Roadrunners during the 1976–77 WHA season. His son, Matt Davidson, played in the National Hockey League (NHL).

== Career statistics ==
=== Regular season and playoffs ===
			Regular season					Playoffs
Season	Team	League	GP	G	A	Pts	PIM	GP	G	A	Pts	PIM
1971–72	Flin Flon Bombers	WCHL	11	2	1	3	28	—	—	—	—	—
1972–73	Flin Flon Bombers	WCHL	68	7	16	23	107	—	—	—	—	—
1973–74	Flin Flon Bombers	WCHL	55	4	12	16	64	—	—	—	—	—
1974–75	Flin Flon Bombers	WCHL	66	17	47	64	118	—	—	—	—	—
1975–76	Tucson Mavericks	CHL	75	6	20	26	59	—	—	—	—	—
1976–77	Oklahoma City Blazers	CHL	70	4	8	12	40	—	—	—	—	—
1976–77	Phoenix Roadrunners	WHA	2	0	0	0	2	—	—	—	—	—
1977–78	St. Boniface Mohawks	CSHL	––	8	7	15	55	—	—	—	—	—
1979–80	University of Manitoba	GPAC	26	10	18	28	48	—	—	—	—	—
WHA totals			2	0	0	0	0	–	–	–	–	–
