= List of WHA head coaches =

The list of the coaches of the World Hockey Association lists all head coaches of the World Hockey Association, which led the league during the period of 1972-1979 a team through at least a WHA game.

== Alphabetical Listing ==
Abbreviations:

W = Wins, L = Losses, T = Ties, Pts = Points, Win % = Points percentage

Comments: In this table, only the games of the regular season are listed.

Name	Seasons	Teams	Games	W	L	T	Pts	Win %
John F. Bassett	1977/78	Birmingham Bulls	3	0	3	0	0	0.000
Andy Bathgate	1973/74	Vancouver Blazers	59	21	37	1	43	0.364
Bobby Baun	1975/76	Toronto Toros	55	15	35	5	35	0.318
Don Blackburn	1975/76; 1978/79	New England Whalers	44	18	23	3	39	0.443
Marc Boileau	1976/77–1977/78	Quebec Nordiques	140	74	61	5	153	0.546
John Brophy	1978/79	Birmingham Bulls	80	32	42	6	70	0.438
Joe Crozier	1974/75; 1975/76–1976/77	Vancouver Blazers; Calgary Cowboys	239	109	117	13	231	0.483
Jacques Demers	1975/76–1976/77; 1977/78; 1978/79	Indianapolis Racers; Cincinnati Stingers; Quebec Nordiques	311	144	145	22	310	0.498
Bill Dineen	1972/73–1977/78; 1978/79	Houston Aeros; New England Whalers	545	318	199	28	664	0.609
Clare Drake	1975/76	Edmonton Oilers	48	18	28	2	38	0.396
Maurice Filion	1972/73; 1977/78	Quebec Nordiques	97	45	46	6	96	0.495
Jean-Guy Gendron	1974/75–1975/76	Quebec Nordiques	159	96	59	4	196	0.616
Bill Goldsworthy	1977/78	Indianapolis Racers	29	8	20	1	17	0.293
Bep Guidolin	1976/77	Edmonton Oilers	63	25	36	2	52	0.413
John Hanna	1974/75	Cleveland Crusaders	33	14	18	1	29	0.439
Billy Harris	1972/73; 1973/74–1974/75	Ottawa Nationals; Toronto Toros	197	99	89	9	207	0.525
Camille Henry	1972/73; 1973/74	New York Raiders; New York Golden Blades/Jersey Knights	97	38	55	4	80	0.412
Larry Hillman	1977/78–1978/79	Winnipeg Jets	141	78	55	8	164	0.582
Harry Howell	1973/74; 1974/75	New York Golden Blades/Jersey Knights; San Diego Mariners	136	69	61	6	144	0.529
Sandy Hucul	1974/75–1975/76	Phoenix Roadrunners	158	78	66	14	170	0.538
Bobby Hull	1972/73–1974/75	Winnipeg Jets	169	81	79	9	171	0.506
Bill Hunter	1974/75–1975/76	Edmonton Oilers	52	15	33	4	34	0.327
Ron Ingram	1975/76–1976/77; 1977/78	San Diego Mariners; Indianapolis Racers	212	92	106	14	198	0.467
Jack Kelley	1972/73; 1974/75–1975/76	New England Whalers	116	63	48	5	131	0.565
Pat Kelly	1976/77	Birmingham Bulls	57	24	30	3	51	0.447
Ray Kinasewich	1972/73	Alberta Oilers	78	38	37	3	79	0.506
Bobby Kromm	1975/76–1976/77	Winnipeg Jets	161	98	59	4	200	0.621
Bob Leduc	1974/75	Toronto Toros	37	20	16	1	41	0.554
Gilles Leger	1975/76; 1976/77	Toronto Toros; Birmingham Bulls	50	16	33	1	33	0.330
Boris Mayorov	1977/78–1978/79	Soviet All-Stars	14	7	5	2	16	0.571
Jack McCartan	1973/74; 1974/75	Minnesota Fighting Saints	3	2	1	0	4	0.667
Ted McCaskill	1973/74	Los Angeles Sharks	59	20	39	0	40	0.339
John McKenzie	1972/73; 1973/74	Philadelphia Blazers; Vancouver Blazers	14	4	10	0	8	0.286
Tom McVie	1978/79	Winnipeg Jets	19	11	8	0	22	0.579
Gerry Moore	1974/75–1975/76	Indianapolis Racers	83	19	61	3	41	0.247
Harry Neale	1972/73–1975/76; 1975/76–1977/78	Minnesota Fighting Saints; New England Whalers	404	208	175	21	437	0.541
Bill Needham	1972/73–1973/74	Cleveland Crusaders	156	80	64	12	172	0.551
Stanislav Nevesely	1977/78	Czechoslovakia	8	1	6	1	3	0.188
Rudy Pilous	1974/75	Winnipeg Jets	65	34	26	5	73	0.562
Jacques Plante	1973/74	Quebec Nordiques	78	38	36	4	80	0.513
Marcel Pronovost	1972/73	Chicago Cougars	78	26	50	2	54	0.346
Jerry Rafter	1977/78	Cincinnati Stingers	5	2	3	0	4	0.400
Maurice Richard	1972/73	Quebec Nordiques	2	1	1	0	2	0.500
Al Rollins	1976/77	Phoenix Roadrunners	80	28	48	4	60	0.375
Ron Ryan	1973/74–1974/75	New England Whalers	151	83	59	9	175	0.579
Glen Sather	1976/77–1978/79	Edmonton Oilers	178	95	76	7	197	0.553
Brian Shaw	1973/74–1974/75	Edmonton Oilers	137	68	63	6	142	0.518
Terry Slater	1972/73–1973/74; 1975/76–1976/77	Los Angeles Sharks; Cincinnati Stingers	258	116	130	12	244	0.473
Floyd Smith	1978/79	Cincinnati Stingers	80	33	41	6	72	0.450
Glen Sonmor	1972/73; 1976/77; 1977/78	Minnesota Fighting Saints; Birmingham Bulls	178	83	84	11	177	0.497
Pat Stapleton	1973/74–1974/75; 1978/79	Chicago Cougars; Indianapolis Racers	181	73	100	8	154	0.425
Jean-Guy Talbot	1975/76	Denver Spurs/Ottawa Civics	41	14	26	1	29	0.354
Jack Vivian	1974/75	Cleveland Crusaders	45	21	22	2	44	0.489
Phil Watson	1972/73; 1973/74	Philadelphia Blazers; Vancouver Blazers	80	40	43	0	80	0.482
Ian Wilkie	1972/73	New York Raiders	1	1	0	0	2	1.000
Johnny Wilson	1974/75; 1975/76	Michigan Stags/Baltimore Blades; Cleveland Crusaders	158	56	93	9	121	0.383

== Sources ==
- WHA Coach Register at hockey-reference.com
