= 1975–76 Edmonton Oilers season =

WHA hockey team season

1975–76 Edmonton Oilers
- Division: 4th Central
- 1975–76 record: 27–49–5
- Home record: 20–17–3
- Road record: 7–32–2
- Goals for: 268
- Goals against: 345

Team information
- General manager: Bill Hunter
- Coach: Clare Drake (18–28–2); Bill Hunter (9–21–3)
- Captain: Al Hamilton
- Alternate captains: Doug Barrie; Barry Long; Bruce MacGregor
- Arena: Northlands Coliseum
- Minor league affiliates: Spokane Flyers (WIHL); Greensboro Generals (SHL)

Team leaders
- Goals: Ed Patenaude (42)
- Assists: Norm Ullman (56)
- Points: Norm Ullman (87)
- Penalty minutes: Ed Patenaude (88)
- Plus/minus: Mike Rogers (+5)
- Wins: Dave Dryden (22)
- Goals against average: Dave Dryden (3.95)

The 1975–76 Edmonton Oilers season was the Oilers' fourth season of operation. The Oilers placed fourth to qualify for the playoffs, losing in the first round.

== Regular season ==
=== Final standings ===
Canadian Division	GP	W	L	T	Pts	GF	GA	PIM
Winnipeg Jets	81	52	27	2	106	345	254	940
Quebec Nordiques	81	50	27	4	104	371	316	1654
Calgary Cowboys	80	41	35	4	86	307	282	1064
Edmonton Oilers	81	27	49	5	59	268	345	991
Toronto Toros	81	24	52	5	53	335	398	1099
Denver Spurs / Ottawa Civics+	41	14	26	1	29	134	172	536

+team started season in Western Division when playing in Denver; transferred by league to Canadian Division shortly after moving to Ottawa.

== Schedule and results ==
1975–76 regular season
October

Game	Result	Date	Score	Opponent	Record
1	L	October 10, 1975	1–4	Minnesota Fighting Saints (1975–76)	0–1–0
2	W	October 12, 1975	6–5	Indianapolis Racers (1975–76)	1–1–0
3	L	October 14, 1975	5–8	@ Quebec Nordiques (1975–76)	1–2–0
4	L	October 15, 1975	4–5 OT	@ New England Whalers (1975–76)	1–3–0
5	T	October 17, 1975	4–4	@ Toronto Toros (1975–76)	1–3–1
6	W	October 18, 1975	3–1	@ Minnesota Fighting Saints (1975–76)	2–3–1
7	W	October 19, 1975	4–2	Cincinnati Stingers (1975–76)	3–3–1
8	L	October 23, 1975	4–6	@ Cincinnati Stingers (1975–76)	3–4–1
9	L	October 25, 1975	2–5	@ Cleveland Crusaders (1975–76)	3–5–1
10	L	October 26, 1975	3–4	@ Indianapolis Racers (1975–76)	3–6–1
11	W	October 28, 1975	7–3	Phoenix Roadrunners (1975–76)	4–6–1
12	T	October 31, 1975	2–2	New England Whalers (1975–76)	4–6–2

November

Game	Result	Date	Score	Opponent	Record
13	W	November 2, 1975	5–3	San Diego Mariners (1975–76)	5–6–2
14	L	November 4, 1975	3–4	Quebec Nordiques (1975–76)	5–7–2
15	W	November 7, 1975	5–4 OT	Toronto Toros (1975–76)	6–7–2
16	W	November 9, 1975	4–1	Cleveland Crusaders (1975–76)	7–7–2
17	L	November 11, 1975	3–6	@ Calgary Cowboys (1975–76)	7–8–2
18	L	November 14, 1975	1–6	@ Winnipeg Jets (1975–76)	7–9–2
19	W	November 17, 1975	6–3	San Diego Mariners (1975–76)	8–9–2
20	L	November 18, 1975	3–6	@ Denver Spurs/Ottawa Civics (1975–76)	8–10–2
21	L	November 20, 1975	1–3	@ Phoenix Roadrunners (1975–76)	8–11–2
22	L	November 21, 1975	2–4	@ Houston Aeros (1975–76)	8–12–2
23	W	November 22, 1975	3–2 OT	@ San Diego Mariners (1975–76)	9–12–2
24	L	November 25, 1975	2–7	@ San Diego Mariners (1975–76)	9–13–2
25	L	November 28, 1975	4–7	@ Houston Aeros (1975–76)	9–14–2
26	W	November 30, 1975	4–2	Calgary Cowboys (1975–76)	10–14–2

December

Game	Result	Date	Score	Opponent	Record
27	W	December 2, 1975	7–2	Toronto Toros (1975–76)	11–14–2
28	L	December 5, 1975	3–8	@ Calgary Cowboys (1975–76)	11–15–2
29	L	December 7, 1975	4–5	Calgary Cowboys (1975–76)	11–16–2
30	W	December 10, 1975	7–4	Quebec Nordiques (1975–76)	12–16–2
31	W	December 11, 1975	3–2	@ Calgary Cowboys (1975–76)	13–16–2
32	L	December 14, 1975	1–3	Winnipeg Jets (1975–76)	13–17–2
33	W	December 16, 1975	3–1	@ Indianapolis Racers (1975–76)	14–17–2
34	W	December 17, 1975	3–2	@ Cleveland Crusaders (1975–76)	15–17–2
35	L	December 19, 1975	2–4	@ New England Whalers (1975–76)	15–18–2
36	L	December 21, 1975	2–4	Toronto Toros (1975–76)	15–19–2
37	L	December 23, 1975	2–6	Winnipeg Jets (1975–76)	15–20–2
38	L	December 26, 1975	6–8	@ Toronto Toros (1975–76)	15–21–2
39	L	December 27, 1975	3–6	@ Quebec Nordiques (1975–76)	15–22–2
40	L	December 30, 1975	3–6	@ Toronto Toros (1975–76)	15–23–2

January

Game	Result	Date	Score	Opponent	Record
41	L	January 1, 1976	1–5	@ Calgary Cowboys (1975–76)	15–24–2
42	L	January 2, 1976	1–3	Calgary Cowboys (1975–76)	15–25–2
43	L	January 4, 1976	1–8	Winnipeg Jets (1975–76)	15–26–2
44	W	January 6, 1976	3–0	Indianapolis Racers (1975–76)	16–26–2
45	W	January 9, 1976	5–3	Toronto Toros (1975–76)	17–26–2
46	L	January 11, 1976	3–5	Houston Aeros (1975–76)	17–27–2
47	W	January 16, 1976	5–1	@ Winnipeg Jets (1975–76)	18–27–2
48	L	January 20, 1976	3–10	Calgary Cowboys (1975–76)	18–28–2
49	L	January 23, 1976	2–4	@ Winnipeg Jets (1975–76)	18–29–2
50	L	January 25, 1976	6–7	@ Quebec Nordiques (1975–76)	18–30–2
51	T	January 27, 1976	4–4	@ Toronto Toros (1975–76)	18–30–3
52	L	January 28, 1976	5–6	Houston Aeros (1975–76)	18–31–3

February

Game	Result	Date	Score	Opponent	Record
53	W	February 1, 1976	5–2	Cincinnati Stingers (1975–76)	19–31–3
54	W	February 3, 1976	4–0	New England Whalers (1975–76)	20–31–3
55	L	February 5, 1976	1–5	@ Phoenix Roadrunners (1975–76)	20–32–3
56	L	February 6, 1976	0–7	@ Cincinnati Stingers (1975–76)	20–33–3
57	L	February 8, 1976	4–5	Quebec Nordiques (1975–76)	20–34–3
58	W	February 13, 1976	5–3	Toronto Toros (1975–76)	21–34–3
59	L	February 15, 1976	2–4	Phoenix Roadrunners (1975–76)	21–35–3
60	T	February 17, 1976	4–4	Winnipeg Jets (1975–76)	21–35–4
61	L	February 20, 1976	2–4	@ Winnipeg Jets (1975–76)	21–36–4
62	W	February 22, 1976	4–3	Minnesota Fighting Saints (1975–76)	22–36–4
63	T	February 24, 1976	3–3	Calgary Cowboys (1975–76)	22–36–5
64	L	February 25, 1976	2–5	@ Calgary Cowboys (1975–76)	22–37–5
65	L	February 27, 1976	3–4	@ Winnipeg Jets (1975–76)	22–38–5
66	L	February 29, 1976	2–5	Cleveland Crusaders (1975–76)	22–39–5

March

Game	Result	Date	Score	Opponent	Record
67	L	March 2, 1976	3–6	@ Calgary Cowboys (1975–76)	22–40–5
68	W	March 3, 1976	6–4	Calgary Cowboys (1975–76)	23–40–5
69	L	March 5, 1976	4–5 OT	Quebec Nordiques (1975–76)	23–41–5
70	W	March 7, 1976	4–2	Quebec Nordiques (1975–76)	24–41–5
71	L	March 11, 1976	0–2	@ Calgary Cowboys (1975–76)	24–42–5
72	L	March 14, 1976	2–4	@ Winnipeg Jets (1975–76)	24–43–5
73	L	March 16, 1976	3–4 OT	Calgary Cowboys (1975–76)	24–44–5
74	W	March 19, 1976	2–1	Winnipeg Jets (1975–76)	25–44–5
75	L	March 21, 1976	3–6	Quebec Nordiques (1975–76)	25–45–5
76	W	March 24, 1976	3–2	@ Winnipeg Jets (1975–76)	26–45–5
77	L	March 25, 1976	5–7	@ Quebec Nordiques (1975–76)	26–46–5
78	L	March 26, 1976	3–7	@ Toronto Toros (1975–76)	26–47–5
79	L	March 30, 1976	3–8	@ Quebec Nordiques (1975–76)	26–48–5

April

Game	Result	Date	Score	Opponent	Record
80	L	April 1, 1976	2–7	@ Quebec Nordiques (1975–76)	26–49–5
81	W	April 4, 1976	5–2	Winnipeg Jets (1975–76)	27–49–5

Legend: Win (2 points) Loss (0 points) Tie (1 point)

== Playoffs ==
1976 Avco Cup playoffs
Division Semifinals vs. (C1) Winnipeg Jets – Jets win 4–0

Game	Date	Visitor	Score	Home	Series
1	April 9	Edmonton Oilers	3–7	Winnipeg Jets	1–0
2	April 11	Edmonton Oilers	4–5 OT	Winnipeg Jets	2–0
3	April 14	Winnipeg Jets	3–2	Edmonton Oilers	3–0
4	April 16	Winnipeg Jets	7–2	Edmonton Oilers	4–0

Legend: Win Loss

== Player statistics ==
Regular season
Scoring

Player	Pos	GP	G	A	Pts	PIM	+/-	PPG	SHG	GWG
Norm Ullman	C	77	31	56	87	12	-21	13	1	1
Rusty Patenaude	RW	77	42	30	72	88	-3	11	0	4
Tim Sheehy	RW	81	34	31	65	17	-4	6	0	6
Barry Long	D	78	10	32	42	66	-49	5	0	2
Ken Baird	D	48	13	24	37	87	-6	3	0	1
Al Hamilton	D	54	2	32	34	78	-8	1	0	0
Bob Russell	C	58	13	18	31	19	-12	0	0	0
Bob McAneeley	LW	71	12	16	28	60	-11	2	0	1
Mike Rogers	C	44	12	15	27	10	5	0	0	2
Rick Morris	LW	33	11	15	26	52	-14	0	4	2
Doug Barrie	D	79	4	21	25	81	-42	0	0	1
Bruce MacGregor	C	63	13	10	23	13	-33	2	1	0
Dan Spring	C	75	12	11	23	8	-25	1	0	1
Wayne Carleton	LW	26	5	16	21	6	-3	2	0	1
Bill Laing	LW	54	8	12	20	67	-10	0	1	1
Peter Morris	LW	75	7	13	20	34	-16	1	0	0
Ted McAneeley	D	79	2	17	19	71	-9	0	0	1
John Rogers	RW	44	9	8	17	34	-13	0	0	0
Skip Krake	C	41	8	8	16	55	-3	2	1	3
Blair MacDonald	RW	29	7	5	12	8	-8	3	0	0
Steve Carlyle	D	28	0	11	11	10	-3	0	0	0
Kerry Ketter	D	48	1	9	10	20	-12	0	0	0
Eddie Joyal	C	45	5	4	9	6	-19	0	0	0
Murray Kennett	D	28	3	4	7	14	-8	1	0	0
Paul Hurley	D	26	1	4	5	14	-5	0	0	0
Bill Evo	RW	8	0	4	4	0	0	0	0	0
Jack Carlson	LW	10	1	1	2	31	-2	0	0	0
Doug Kerslake	RW	13	1	1	2	4	-2	0	0	0
Wayne Muloin	D	10	1	1	2	0	-6	0	0	0
Dave Dryden	G	62	0	2	2	2	0	0	0	0
Frank Turnbull	G	3	0	0	0	0	0	0	0	0
Chris Worthy	G	24	0	0	0	2	0	0	0	0

Goaltending

Player	MIN	GP	W	L	T	GA	GAA	SO
Dave Dryden	3567	62	22	34	5	235	3.95	1
Chris Worthy	1256	24	5	14	0	98	4.68	1
Frank Turnbull	106	3	0	1	0	9	5.09	0
Team:	4929	81	27	49	5	342	4.16	2

Playoffs
Scoring

Player	Pos	GP	G	A	Pts	PIM	PPG	SHG	GWG
Rusty Patenaude	RW	4	1	4	5	12	0	0	0
Ken Baird	D	4	3	1	4	16	0	0	0
Tim Sheehy	RW	4	2	2	4	0	0	0	0
Norm Ullman	C	4	1	3	4	2	0	0	0
Wayne Carleton	LW	4	1	1	2	2	0	0	0
Dan Spring	C	2	1	1	2	0	0	0	0
Bob McAneeley	LW	3	1	0	1	0	0	0	0
Bob Russell	C	4	1	0	1	0	0	0	0
Doug Barrie	D	4	0	1	1	15	0	0	0
Al Hamilton	D	4	0	1	1	6	0	0	0
Bill Laing	LW	4	0	1	1	4	0	0	0
Bruce MacGregor	C	4	0	1	1	0	0	0	0
Peter Morris	LW	3	0	1	1	7	0	0	0
Rick Morris	LW	4	0	1	1	4	0	0	0
Jack Carlson	LW	4	0	0	0	4	0	0	0
Dave Dryden	G	3	0	0	0	0	0	0	0
Paul Hurley	D	4	0	0	0	0	0	0	0
Barry Long	D	4	0	0	0	4	0	0	0
Ted McAneeley	D	4	0	0	0	0	0	0	0
Wayne Muloin	D	1	0	0	0	0	0	0	0
Chris Worthy	G	1	0	0	0	0	0	0	0

Goaltending

Player	MIN	GP	W	L	GA	GAA	SO
Dave Dryden	180	3	0	3	15	5.00	0
Chris Worthy	60	1	0	1	7	7.00	0
Team:	240	4	0	4	22	5.50	0

Note: Pos = Position; GP = Games played; G = Goals; A = Assists; Pts = Points; +/- = plus/minus; PIM = Penalty minutes; PPG = Power-play goals; SHG = Short-handed goals; GWG = Game-winning goals
MIN = Minutes played; W = Wins; L = Losses; T = Ties; GA = Goals-against; GAA = Goals-against average; SO = Shutouts;

== Transactions ==
=== Trades ===
Date	To Edmonton Oilers	Traded to	Traded for
June 1975	Joe Fortunato	Cleveland Crusaders	John Stewart
June 1975	Future considerations	Winnipeg Jets	Bill Lesuk
June 2, 1975	Ted McAneeley	Houston Aeros	2nd-round pick in 1976 - Kent Nilsson
August 29, 1975	Skip Krake	Cleveland Crusaders	Ray McKay
September 1975	Cash	Denver Spurs	Brian Lavender
September 1975	Cash	Indianapolis Racers	Randy Wyrozub
September 11, 1975	1st-round pick in 1976 - Bernie Federko; 3rd-round pick in 1976 - Drew Callander	Phoenix Roadrunners	Barry Dean
December 8, 1975	3rd-round pick in 1976 - Harold Phillipoff	Indianapolis Racers	Blair MacDonald
January 4, 1976	Wayne Muloin	Cleveland Crusaders	Bill Evo; Future considerations
January 19, 1976	Wayne Carleton	New England Whalers	Mike Rogers; Future considerations
January 30, 1976	Paul Hurley; Clark Jantzie	New England Whalers	Steve Carlyle; Kerry Ketter
March 15, 1976	Jack Carlson	San Diego Mariners	2 WHA Amateur Draft picks

=== Players acquired ===
Date	Player	Former team	Term
June 2, 1975	Bob McAneeley	California Golden Seals (NHL)	2-year
June 2, 1975	Allie Sutherland	Omaha Knights (CHL)	
June 19, 1975	Dave Dryden	Chicago Cougars	
June 19, 1975	Bill Evo	Baltimore Blades	
June 19, 1975	Boris Mikhailov	Baltimore Blades	
June 19, 1975	Vladimir Petrov	Baltimore Blades	
September 1975	Steve McKnight	Alberta Golden Bears (CWUAA)	
September 1975	Dan Spring	Winnipeg Jets	2-year
January 22, 1976	Rick Morris	Ottawa Civics	1-year
February 8, 1976	Frank Turnbull	Spokane Chiefs (WIHL)	
March 1976	Jeff Carlson	Minnesota Fighting Saints	

=== Players lost ===
Date	Player	New team
1975	Tom Gilmore	Retired
1975	Don Herriman	Retired
June 1975	Leif Holmqvist	Indianapolis Racers
August 15, 1975	Ross Perkins	Retired
September 24, 1975	Bobby Sheehan	Chicago Black Hawks (NHL)
September 29, 1975	Ken Brown	Retired
October 21, 1975	Jacques Plante	Retired

=== Signings ===
Date	Player	Term
June 2, 1975	Kerry Ketter	
August 7, 1975	Peter Morris	3-year
August 7, 1975	Bob Russell	3-year
August 14, 1975	Ken Baird	2-year
August 14, 1975	Eddie Joyal	
September 17, 1975	Norm Ullman	1-year
November 26, 1975	John Rogers	

== Draft picks ==
Edmonton's draft picks at the 1975 WHA Amateur Draft.

Round	#	Player	Nationality	College/Junior/Club team (League)
1	6	Barry Dean (LW)	Canada	Medicine Hat Tigers (WCHL)
2	21	Peter Morris (LW)	Canada	Victoria Cougars (WCHL)
3	36	Barry Smith (C)	Canada	New Westminster Bruins (WCHL)
4	51	Stu Younger (F)	Canada	Michigan Tech University (WCHA)
5	66	Jim Ofrim (F)	Canada	University of Alberta (CWUAA)
6	79	Bob Sunderland (D)	United States	Boston University (ECAC)
7	93	Dave Bell (F)	Canada	Harvard University (ECAC)
8	105	Sidney Veysey (C)	Canada	Sherbrooke Castors (QMJHL)
9	117	Bob Russell (C)	Canada	Sudbury Wolves (OHA)
10	130	Jean Thibodeau (F)	Canada	Shawinigan Dynamos (QMJHL)
11	143	Brian Petrovek (G)	United States	Harvard University (ECAC)
12	154	Jim Montgomery (C)	Canada	Hull Festivals (QMJHL)
13	164	Terry Angel (F)	Canada	Oshawa Generals (OHA)
14	171	Rick Shinske (C)	Canada	New Westminster Bruins (WCHL)

== See also ==
- 1975–76 WHA season
