= 1975–76 Cleveland Crusaders season =

1975–76 Cleveland Crusaders
- Division: 2nd East
- 1975–76 record: 35–40–5
- Home record: 23–15–2
- Road record: 12–25–3
- Goals for: 273
- Goals against: 279

Team information
- Coach: Johnny Wilson
- Captain: Paul Shmyr
- Arena: Coliseum at Richfield

Team leaders
- Goals: Rich LeDuc (36)
- Assists: Ron Ward (50)
- Points: Ron Ward (82)
- Penalty minutes: Paul Baxter (201)
- Wins: Gerry Cheevers (11)
- Goals against average: Cam Newton (3.21)

The 1975–76 Cleveland Crusaders season was the Cleveland Crusaders' fourth season of operation in the World Hockey Association. It was the last season of the franchise in Cleveland, Ohio. It would relocate to Minnesota for the next season.

== Regular season ==
=== Final standings ===
Eastern Division	GP	W	L	T	Pts	GF	GA	PIM
Indianapolis Racers	80	35	39	6	76	245	247	1301
Cleveland Crusaders	80	35	40	5	75	273	279	1356
New England Whalers	80	33	40	7	73	255	290	1012
Cincinnati Stingers	80	35	44	1	71	285	340	1344

== Schedule and results ==
1975–76 regular season
October

Game	Result	Date	Score	Opponent	Record
1	L	October 11, 1975	0–1	Cincinnati Stingers (1975–76)	0–1–0
2	W	October 15, 1975	8–4	@ Minnesota Fighting Saints (1975–76)	1–1–0
3	L	October 19, 1975	5–6	Houston Aeros (1975–76)	1–2–0
4	W	October 25, 1975	5–2	Edmonton Oilers (1975–76)	2–2–0
5	L	October 29, 1975	1–3	Calgary Cowboys (1975–76)	2–3–0
6	W	October 31, 1975	6–2	Quebec Nordiques (1975–76)	3–3–0

November

Game	Result	Date	Score	Opponent	Record
7	W	November 2, 1975	5–2	Phoenix Roadrunners (1975–76)	4–3–0
8	T	November 4, 1975	2–2	@ Denver Spurs/Ottawa Civics (1975–76)	4–3–1
9	L	November 7, 1975	2–5	@ Calgary Cowboys (1975–76)	4–4–1
10	L	November 9, 1975	1–4	@ Edmonton Oilers (1975–76)	4–5–1
11	W	November 11, 1975	3–2	@ Winnipeg Jets (1975–76)	5–5–1
12	L	November 13, 1975	1–3	@ San Diego Mariners (1975–76)	5–6–1
13	L	November 15, 1975	4–5 OT	@ Denver Spurs/Ottawa Civics (1975–76)	5–7–1
14	T	November 16, 1975	4–4	@ Phoenix Roadrunners (1975–76)	5–7–2
15	W	November 19, 1975	4–3 OT	Minnesota Fighting Saints (1975–76)	6–7–2
16	W	November 22, 1975	6–3	Winnipeg Jets (1975–76)	7–7–2
17	W	November 25, 1975	4–3 OT	@ Toronto Toros (1975–76)	8–7–2
18	L	November 26, 1975	0–3	Denver Spurs/Ottawa Civics (1975–76)	8–8–2
19	L	November 28, 1975	1–3	Indianapolis Racers (1975–76)	8–9–2
20	W	November 30, 1975	10–9	Toronto Toros (1975–76)	9–9–2

December

Game	Result	Date	Score	Opponent	Record
21	L	December 2, 1975	2–9	@ Quebec Nordiques (1975–76)	9–10–2
22	L	December 3, 1975	3–5	Cincinnati Stingers (1975–76)	9–11–2
23	L	December 6, 1975	2–3	@ Indianapolis Racers (1975–76)	9–12–2
24	L	December 7, 1975	1–3	@ Cincinnati Stingers (1975–76)	9–13–2
25	L	December 9, 1975	3–6	@ Denver Spurs/Ottawa Civics (1975–76)	9–14–2
26	W	December 12, 1975	1–0	Minnesota Fighting Saints (1975–76)	10–14–2
27	L	December 13, 1975	4–5	@ New England Whalers (1975–76)	10–15–2
28	L	December 14, 1975	3–4	Houston Aeros (1975–76)	10–16–2
29	L	December 17, 1975	2–3	Edmonton Oilers (1975–76)	10–17–2
30	L	December 19, 1975	4–5 OT	@ Indianapolis Racers (1975–76)	10–18–2
31	W	December 20, 1975	5–3	Indianapolis Racers (1975–76)	11–18–2
32	L	December 22, 1975	1–4	New England Whalers (1975–76)	11–19–2
33	W	December 27, 1975	5–0	Toronto Toros (1975–76)	12–19–2
34	L	December 28, 1975	0–4	@ New England Whalers (1975–76)	12–20–2

January

Game	Result	Date	Score	Opponent	Record
35	W	January 2, 1976	5–4 OT	Quebec Nordiques (1975–76)	13–20–2
36	L	January 3, 1976	2–3	@ New England Whalers (1975–76)	13–21–2
37	W	January 4, 1976	3–2	Phoenix Roadrunners (1975–76)	14–21–2
38	W	January 7, 1976	8–3	San Diego Mariners (1975–76)	15–21–2
39	L	January 9, 1976	5–6	@ Houston Aeros (1975–76)	15–22–2
40	W	January 11, 1976	4–3	Indianapolis Racers (1975–76)	16–22–2
41	W	January 15, 1976	3–1	@ Indianapolis Racers (1975–76)	17–22–2
42	W	January 16, 1976	4–3	New England Whalers (1975–76)	18–22–2
43	L	January 17, 1976	4–5	@ San Diego Mariners (1975–76)	18–23–2
44	L	January 21, 1976	2–8	@ Cincinnati Stingers (1975–76)	18–24–2
45	T	January 23, 1976	2–2	New England Whalers (1975–76)	18–24–3
46	L	January 25, 1976	2–4	@ Indianapolis Racers (1975–76)	18–25–3
47	W	January 28, 1976	6–4	@ Cincinnati Stingers (1975–76)	19–25–3
48	T	January 30, 1976	4–4	@ Phoenix Roadrunners (1975–76)	19–25–4

February

Game	Result	Date	Score	Opponent	Record
49	W	February 1, 1976	6–5	@ Minnesota Fighting Saints (1975–76)	20–25–4
50	L	February 4, 1976	1–5	@ Phoenix Roadrunners (1975–76)	20–26–4
51	L	February 5, 1976	2–3	@ San Diego Mariners (1975–76)	20–27–4
52	T	February 7, 1976	4–4	Winnipeg Jets (1975–76)	20–27–5
53	W	February 8, 1976	6–1	@ New England Whalers (1975–76)	21–27–5
54	W	February 11, 1976	4–2	Cincinnati Stingers (1975–76)	22–27–5
55	L	February 15, 1976	2–3	New England Whalers (1975–76)	22–28–5
56	W	February 18, 1976	4–0	Calgary Cowboys (1975–76)	23–28–5
57	L	February 19, 1976	3–5	@ Houston Aeros (1975–76)	23–29–5
58	W	February 21, 1976	3–2	Indianapolis Racers (1975–76)	24–29–5
59	W	February 22, 1976	2–1	Houston Aeros (1975–76)	25–29–5
60	L	February 25, 1976	2–5	@ Winnipeg Jets (1975–76)	25–30–5
61	L	February 27, 1976	4–5	@ Calgary Cowboys (1975–76)	25–31–5
62	W	February 29, 1976	5–2	@ Edmonton Oilers (1975–76)	26–31–5

March

Game	Result	Date	Score	Opponent	Record
63	L	March 3, 1976	3–4 OT	@ Cincinnati Stingers (1975–76)	26–32–5
64	W	March 6, 1976	5–4	@ Houston Aeros (1975–76)	27–32–5
65	W	March 7, 1976	5–1	@ Indianapolis Racers (1975–76)	28–32–5
66	W	March 10, 1976	5–2	Cincinnati Stingers (1975–76)	29–32–5
67	L	March 12, 1976	2–8	@ New England Whalers (1975–76)	29–33–5
68	L	March 14, 1976	2–3 OT	Phoenix Roadrunners (1975–76)	29–34–5
69	L	March 16, 1976	0–6	@ Toronto Toros (1975–76)	29–35–5
70	W	March 19, 1976	6–5 OT	@ Phoenix Roadrunners (1975–76)	30–35–5
71	L	March 20, 1976	5–6	Toronto Toros (1975–76)	30–36–5
72	W	March 21, 1976	4–1	Cincinnati Stingers (1975–76)	31–36–5
73	W	March 23, 1976	3–1	@ Quebec Nordiques (1975–76)	32–36–5
74	L	March 24, 1976	2–3	Houston Aeros (1975–76)	32–37–5
75	L	March 26, 1976	2–3	Indianapolis Racers (1975–76)	32–38–5
76	W	March 31, 1976	5–1	New England Whalers (1975–76)	33–38–5

April

Game	Result	Date	Score	Opponent	Record
77	L	April 2, 1976	2–5	@ Cincinnati Stingers (1975–76)	33–39–5
78	W	April 3, 1976	4–2	San Diego Mariners (1975–76)	34–39–5
79	W	April 4, 1976	6–3	Cincinnati Stingers (1975–76)	35–39–5
80	L	April 6, 1976	2–3 OT	San Diego Mariners (1975–76)	35–40–5

Legend: Win (2 points) Loss (0 points) Tie (1 point)

== Playoffs ==
1976 Avco Cup playoffs
Preliminary round vs. New England Whalers – Whalers win 3–0

Game	Date	Visitor	Score	Home	Series
1	April 9	Cleveland Crusaders	3–5	New England Whalers	0–1
2	April 10	New England Whalers	6–1	Cleveland Crusaders	0–2
3	April 11	New England Whalers	3–2	Cleveland Crusaders	0–3

Legend: Win Loss

== Player statistics ==
=== Players ===
Regular season
Player	Position	GP	G	A	Pts	PIM	+/-	PPG	SHG	GWG
Ron Ward	C	75	32	50	82	24	14	11	2	2
Jim Harrison	C	59	34	38	72	62	4	9	2	5
Rich Leduc	C	79	36	22	58	76	7	8	2	6
Gerry Pinder	LW	79	21	30	51	118	-8	8	3	2
Danny Gruen	LW	80	26	24	50	72	9	5	0	4
Paul Shmyr	D	70	6	44	50	101	16	4	1	2
Al McDonough	RW	80	23	22	45	19	1	4	0	1
Russ Walker	RW	72	23	15	38	122	-7	5	0	2
Tom Edur	D	80	7	28	35	62	15	3	0	0
Gary Jarrett	LW	69	16	17	33	22	-4	1	0	1
John Stewart	LW	79	12	21	33	43	-3	0	0	3
Juhani Tamminen	RW	65	7	14	21	0	-8	2	0	0
Bryan Maxwell	D	73	3	14	17	177	-13	0	0	1
Terry Ball	D	23	2	15	17	18	-21	2	0	0
Ray McKay	D	68	3	10	13	44	-8	1	0	1
Lyle Moffat	LW	33	4	7	11	33	10	1	0	1
John Stewart	C	42	2	9	11	15	-2	0	0	0
Paul Baxter	D	67	3	7	10	201	-7	1	0	1
Randy Legge	D	44	1	8	9	28	-7	0	0	0
Gary MacGregor	C	35	5	3	8	6	-16	4	0	2
Wayne Connelly	C	12	5	2	7	4	-1	3	0	1
Barry Legge	D	35	0	7	7	22	-8	0	0	0
Bill Evo	RW	40	1	5	6	32	-15	0	0	0
Wayne Muloin	D	27	0	5	5	12	-7	0	0	0
Terry Holbrook	RW	15	1	2	3	6	-1	0	1	0
Mike Conroy	LW	4	0	1	1	0	0	0	0	0
Cam Newton	G	15	0	1	1	0	0	0	0	0
Brian Bowles	D	3	0	0	0	0	-2	0	0	0
Jacques Caron	G	2	0	0	0	0	0	0	0	0
Gerry Cheevers	G	28	0	0	0	15	0	0	0	0
Bob Johnson	G	18	0	0	0	2	0	0	0	0
Bob Whidden	G	21	0	0	0	2	0	0	0	0

Avco Cup playoffs
Player	Position	GP	G	A	Pts	PIM	PPG	SHG	GWG
Rich Leduc	C	3	2	1	3	2	0	0	0
Gary Jarrett	LW	3	0	3	3	2	0	0	0
Danny Gruen	LW	3	2	0	2	0	0	0	0
Tom Edur	D	3	0	2	2	0	0	0	0
Ron Ward	C	3	0	2	2	0	0	0	0
Wayne Connelly	C	3	1	0	1	2	0	0	0
Al McDonough	RW	3	1	0	1	2	0	0	0
Jim Harrison	C	3	0	1	1	9	0	0	0
Barry Legge	D	3	0	1	1	12	0	0	0
Bryan Maxwell	D	2	0	1	1	4	0	0	0
Paul Baxter	D	3	0	0	0	10	0	0	0
Terry Holbrook	RW	3	0	0	0	0	0	0	0
Bob Johnson	G	2	0	0	0	0	0	0	0
Randy Legge	D	3	0	0	0	0	0	0	0
Gary MacGregor	C	3	0	0	0	4	0	0	0
Ray McKay	D	3	0	0	0	4	0	0	0
Cam Newton	G	1	0	0	0	0	0	0	0
Gerry Pinder	LW	3	0	0	0	4	0	0	0
John Stewart	LW	3	0	0	0	0	0	0	0
Juhani Tamminen	RW	1	0	0	0	0	0	0	0
Russ Walker	RW	3	0	0	0	18	0	0	0

=== Goaltending ===
Regular season
Player	MIN	GP	W	L	T	GA	GAA	SO
Gerry Cheevers	1570	28	11	14	1	95	3.63	1
Bob Johnson	1043	18	9	8	0	56	3.22	1
Cam Newton	896	15	7	7	1	48	3.21	0
Bob Whidden	1230	21	7	11	2	70	3.41	1
Jacques Caron	130	2	1	0	1	8	3.69	0
Team:	4869	80	35	40	5	277	3.41	3

Avco Cup playoffs
Player	MIN	GP	W	L	GA	GAA	SO
Bob Johnson	120	2	0	2	8	4.00	0
Cam Newton	60	1	0	1	6	6.00	0
Team:	180	3	0	3	14	4.67	0

Note: Pos = Position; GP = Games played; G = Goals; A = Assists; Pts = Points; +/- = plus/minus; PIM = Penalty minutes; PPG = Power-play goals; SHG = Short-handed goals; GWG = Game-winning goals
MIN = Minutes played; W = Wins; L = Losses; T = Ties; GA = Goals-against; GAA = Goals-against average; SO = Shutouts;

== Draft picks ==
Cleveland's draft picks at the 1975 WHA Amateur Draft.

Round	#	Player	Nationality	College/Junior/Club team (League)
1	5	Ralph Klassen (F)	Canada	Saskatoon Blades (WCHL)
2	19	Mal Zinger (F)	Canada	Kamloops Chiefs (WCHL)
2	20	Kelly Greenbank (RW)	Austria	Winnipeg Clubs (WCHL)
3	35	Ed Staniowski (G)	Canada	Regina Pats (WCHL)
4	50	Peter Scamurra (D)	Canada	Peterborough Petes (OHA)
5	65	Dennis Maruk (F)	Canada	London Knights (OHA)
6	78	Joe Augustine (D)	United States	Austin Mavericks (MidJHL)
7	92	Michel Lachance (D)	Canada	Montreal Red White and Blue (QMJHL)
8	104	Joe Fortunato (LW)	Canada	Kitchener Rangers (OHA)
9	116	Viktor Khatulev (F)	Latvia	Dynamo Riga (USSR)
10	129	Ari Kankaanpera (D)	Finland	Ilves Tampere (SM-sarja)
11	142	Tom McNamara (G)	United States	University of Vermont (ECAC)
12	153	Rick Marsh (D)	Canada	R.P.I. (ECAC)
13	163	Dan Shearer (C)	Canada	Hamilton Fincups (OHA)

== See also ==
- 1975–76 WHA season
