= 1975–76 New England Whalers season =

1975–76 New England Whalers
- Division: 3rd East
- 1975–76 record: 33–40–7
- Home record: 22–16–2
- Road record: 11–24–5
- Goals for: 255
- Goals against: 290

Team information
- General manager: Jack Kelley (Oct–Dec); Ron Ryan (Dec–Apr)
- Coach: Jack Kelley (14–16–3); Don Blackburn (14–18–3); Harry Neale (5–6–1)
- Captain: Rick Ley
- Arena: Hartford Civic Center

Team leaders
- Goals: Tom Webster (33)
- Assists: Tom Webster (50)
- Points: Tom Webster (83)
- Penalty minutes: Gordie Roberts (102)
- Wins: Christer Abrahamsson (18)
- Goals against average: Christer Abrahamsson (3.42)

The 1975–76 New England Whalers season was the Whalers' fourth season of play in the World Hockey Association. On December 26, 1975, Jack Kelley resigned as general manager/coach to the acceptance of general partner Howard Baldwin. He was replaced on an interim basis by Don Blackburn. He won his first game on December 26th by a score of 4–3 over the Cincinnati Stingers before hitting a slump that saw him go 14–18–3; he resigned from his position on March 11 (with just twelve games remaining) which saw him replaced by Harry Neale, who had been coaching the Minnesota Fighting Saints before the team went under. The Whalers once again made the playoffs and reached the WHA Semifinals with the two-time defending champion Houston Aeros. The Whalers forced Game 7 but lost to the Aeros 2–0 to end their season.

== Regular season ==
=== Final standings ===
Eastern Division	GP	W	L	T	Pts	GF	GA	PIM
Indianapolis Racers	80	35	39	6	76	245	247	1301
Cleveland Crusaders	80	35	40	5	75	273	279	1356
New England Whalers	80	33	40	7	73	255	290	1012
Cincinnati Stingers	80	35	44	1	71	285	340	1344

== Schedule and results ==
1975–76 regular season
October

Game	Result	Date	Score	Opponent	Record
1	L	October 11, 1975	0–5	Houston Aeros (1975–76)	0–1–0
2	W	October 15, 1975	5–4 OT	Edmonton Oilers (1975–76)	1–1–0
3	W	October 18, 1975	3–1	Toronto Toros (1975–76)	2–1–0
4	L	October 21, 1975	1–6	@ Quebec Nordiques (1975–76)	2–2–0
5	W	October 24, 1975	5–4	@ Toronto Toros (1975–76)	3–2–0
6	W	October 26, 1975	3–1	Calgary Cowboys (1975–76)	4–2–0
7	W	October 29, 1975	4–2	Quebec Nordiques (1975–76)	5–2–0
8	T	October 31, 1975	2–2	@ Edmonton Oilers (1975–76)	5–2–1

November

Game	Result	Date	Score	Opponent	Record
9	L	November 2, 1975	3–4 OT	@ Calgary Cowboys (1975–76)	5–3–1
10	L	November 4, 1975	2–3 OT	@ Winnipeg Jets (1975–76)	5–4–1
11	W	November 6, 1975	8–3	Cincinnati Stingers (1975–76)	6–4–1
12	L	November 8, 1975	2–3	Phoenix Roadrunners (1975–76)	6–5–1
13	L	November 9, 1975	2–4	@ Cincinnati Stingers (1975–76)	6–6–1
14	W	November 12, 1975	4–1	Houston Aeros (1975–76)	7–6–1
15	L	November 15, 1975	1–3	Quebec Nordiques (1975–76)	7–7–1
16	L	November 19, 1975	1–3	@ Indianapolis Racers (1975–76)	7–8–1
17	L	November 20, 1975	0–2	Minnesota Fighting Saints (1975–76)	7–9–1
18	W	November 22, 1975	7–5	Phoenix Roadrunners (1975–76)	8–9–1
19	L	November 23, 1975	2–3	Winnipeg Jets (1975–76)	8–10–1
20	L	November 25, 1975	2–3 OT	@ Minnesota Fighting Saints (1975–76)	8–11–1
21	W	November 28, 1975	7–3	Denver Spurs/Ottawa Civics (1975–76)	9–11–1
22	L	November 29, 1975	2–3	Indianapolis Racers (1975–76)	9–12–1

December

Game	Result	Date	Score	Opponent	Record
23	W	December 2, 1975	5–2	@ Houston Aeros (1975–76)	10–12–1
24	L	December 4, 1975	4–5	@ Phoenix Roadrunners (1975–76)	10–13–1
25	L	December 6, 1975	1–4	@ San Diego Mariners (1975–76)	10–14–1
26	L	December 7, 1975	1–5	@ Denver Spurs/Ottawa Civics (1975–76)	10–15–1
27	W	December 10, 1975	3–2	Minnesota Fighting Saints (1975–76)	11–15–1
28	W	December 13, 1975	5–4	Cleveland Crusaders (1975–76)	12–15–1
29	T	December 14, 1975	2–2	@ Indianapolis Racers (1975–76)	12–15–2
30	T	December 17, 1975	0–0	@ Minnesota Fighting Saints (1975–76)	12–15–3
31	W	December 19, 1975	4–2	Edmonton Oilers (1975–76)	13–15–3
32	L	December 20, 1975	2–4	@ Cincinnati Stingers (1975–76)	13–16–3
33	W	December 22, 1975	4–1	@ Cleveland Crusaders (1975–76)	14–16–3
34	W	December 26, 1975	4–3	Cincinnati Stingers (1975–76)	15–16–3
35	W	December 28, 1975	4–0	Cleveland Crusaders (1975–76)	16–16–3
36	W	December 30, 1975	5–3	San Diego Mariners (1975–76)	17–16–3

January

Game	Result	Date	Score	Opponent	Record
37	W	January 3, 1976	3–2	Cleveland Crusaders (1975–76)	18–16–3
38	L	January 4, 1976	2–3	@ Indianapolis Racers (1975–76)	18–17–3
39	W	January 7, 1976	3–2	@ Denver Spurs/Ottawa Civics (1975–76)	19–17–3
40	L	January 9, 1976	3–5	San Diego Mariners (1975–76)	19–18–3
41	W	January 11, 1976	8–4	San Diego Mariners (1975–76)	20–18–3
42	W	January 15, 1976	5–2	Cincinnati Stingers (1975–76)	21–18–3
43	L	January 16, 1976	3–4	@ Cleveland Crusaders (1975–76)	21–19–3
44	L	January 18, 1976	0–8	@ Winnipeg Jets (1975–76)	21–20–3
45	T	January 20, 1976	4–4	@ Phoenix Roadrunners (1975–76)	21–20–4
46	L	January 21, 1976	3–9	@ Houston Aeros (1975–76)	21–21–4
47	T	January 23, 1976	2–2	@ Cleveland Crusaders (1975–76)	21–21–5
48	L	January 24, 1976	3–6	@ Cincinnati Stingers (1975–76)	21–22–5
49	W	January 28, 1976	6–4	Indianapolis Racers (1975–76)	22–22–5
50	L	January 30, 1976	3–6	Winnipeg Jets (1975–76)	22–23–5

February

Game	Result	Date	Score	Opponent	Record
51	W	February 1, 1976	7–5	@ Toronto Toros (1975–76)	23–23–5
52	L	February 3, 1976	0–4	@ Edmonton Oilers (1975–76)	23–24–5
53	W	February 5, 1976	6–4	@ Calgary Cowboys (1975–76)	24–24–5
54	W	February 7, 1976	7–3	Toronto Toros (1975–76)	25–24–5
55	L	February 8, 1976	1–6	Cleveland Crusaders (1975–76)	25–25–5
56	L	February 13, 1976	1–5	Cincinnati Stingers (1975–76)	25–26–5
57	W	February 15, 1976	3–2	@ Cleveland Crusaders (1975–76)	26–26–5
58	L	February 17, 1976	3–4	@ Houston Aeros (1975–76)	26–27–5
59	L	February 19, 1976	3–10	@ Indianapolis Racers (1975–76)	26–28–5
60	L	February 22, 1976	0–4	@ Quebec Nordiques (1975–76)	26–29–5
61	L	February 25, 1976	2–5	@ Cincinnati Stingers (1975–76)	26–30–5
62	L	February 26, 1976	2–5	Houston Aeros (1975–76)	26–31–5
63	T	February 28, 1976	4–4	Indianapolis Racers (1975–76)	26–31–6

March

Game	Result	Date	Score	Opponent	Record
64	W	March 2, 1976	4–3	@ San Diego Mariners (1975–76)	27–31–6
65	L	March 4, 1976	2–8	@ San Diego Mariners (1975–76)	27–32–6
66	W	March 6, 1976	5–3	@ Phoenix Roadrunners (1975–76)	28–32–6
67	L	March 7, 1976	3–5	@ Cincinnati Stingers (1975–76)	28–33–6
68	L	March 10, 1976	2–3	Phoenix Roadrunners (1975–76)	28–34–6
69	W	March 12, 1976	8–2	Cleveland Crusaders (1975–76)	29–34–6
70	W	March 13, 1976	5–1	@ Cincinnati Stingers (1975–76)	30–34–6
71	L	March 16, 1976	1–5	@ Quebec Nordiques (1975–76)	30–35–6
72	L	March 17, 1976	2–5	Indianapolis Racers (1975–76)	30–36–6
73	W	March 19, 1976	6–5 OT	Cincinnati Stingers (1975–76)	31–36–6
74	T	March 20, 1976	1–1	Indianapolis Racers (1975–76)	31–36–7
75	L	March 24, 1976	6–7	Calgary Cowboys (1975–76)	31–37–7
76	W	March 26, 1976	4–1	Calgary Cowboys (1975–76)	32–37–7
77	L	March 28, 1976	1–3	Indianapolis Racers (1975–76)	32–38–7
78	L	March 31, 1976	1–5	@ Cleveland Crusaders (1975–76)	32–39–7

April

Game	Result	Date	Score	Opponent	Record
79	W	April 3, 1976	5–2	@ Indianapolis Racers (1975–76)	33–39–7
80	L	April 4, 1976	2–4	Indianapolis Racers (1975–76)	33–40–7

Legend: Win (2 points) Loss (0 points) Tie (1 point)

== Playoffs ==
1976 Avco Cup playoffs
Preliminary Round vs. Cleveland Crusaders – Whalers win 3–0

Game	Date	Visitor	Score	Home	Series
1	April 9	Cleveland Crusaders	3–5	New England Whalers	1–0
2	April 10	New England Whalers	6–1	Cleveland Crusaders	2–0
3	April 11	New England Whalers	3–2	Cleveland Crusaders	3–0

Quarterfinals vs. Indianapolis Racers – Whalers win 4–3

Game	Date	Visitor	Score	Home	Series
1	April 16	New England Whalers	4–1	Indianapolis Racers	1–0
2	April 17	New England Whalers	0–4	Indianapolis Racers	1–1
3	April 21	Indianapolis Racers	0–3	New England Whalers	2–1
4	April 23	Indianapolis Racers	1–2	New England Whalers	3–1
5	April 24	New England Whalers	0–4	Indianapolis Racers	3–2
6	April 27	Indianapolis Racers	5–3	New England	3–3
7	April 29	New England Whalers	6–0	Indianapolis Racers	4–3

Semifinals vs. Houston Aeros – Aeros win 4–3

Game	Date	Visitor	Score	Home	Series
1	May 5	New England Whalers	4–2	Houston Aeros	1–0
2	May 7	New England Whalers	2–5	Houston Aeros	1–1
3	May 9	Houston Aeros	1–4	New England Whalers	2–1
4	May 11	Houston Aeros	4–3	New England Whalers	2–2
5	May 13	New England Whalers	2–4	Houston Aeros	3–2
6	May 15	Houston Aeros	1–6	New England Whalers	3–3
7	May 16	New England Whalers	0–2	Houston Aeros	3–4

Legend: Win Loss

== Roster ==
Updated June 5, 1976.

No.	Nat	Player	Pos	S/G	Age	Acquired	Birthplace
1	(Sweden)	Christer Abrahamsson	G	L	29	1974	Leksand, Sweden
6	(Sweden)	Thommy Abrahamsson	D	L	29	1974	Leksand, Sweden
19	(Canada)	Danny Arndt	LW	L	21	1975	Saskatoon, Saskatchewan
9	(Canada)	Ralph Backstrom	C	L	38	1975	Kirkland Lake, Ontario
22	(Canada)	Don Blackburn	LW	L	38	1973	Kirkland Lake, Ontario
21	(United States)	Dan Bolduc	RW	L	23	1975	Waterville, Maine
22	(Canada)	Don Borgeson	LW	L	31	1975	North Battleford, Saskatchewan
5	(Canada)	Ron Busniuk	D	R	27	1975	Fort William, Ontario
21	(Canada)	Mike Byers	RW	R	29	1973	Toronto, Ontario
7	(Canada)	Terry Caffery	C	R	27	1972	Toronto, Ontario
9	(Canada)	Wayne Carleton	C	L	29	1974	Sudbury, Ontario
18	(Canada)	Bob Charlebois	LW	L	32	1973	Cornwall, Ontario
15	(Canada)	Ron Climie	LW	L	26	1975	Hamilton, Ontario
12	(Canada)	John Danby	C	R	27	1972	Toronto, Ontario
27	(Canada)	Tommy Earl	LW	R	28	1972	Niagara Falls, Ontario
23	(United States)	Nick Fotiu	LW	L	27	1974	Staten Island, New York
26	(Canada)	Marty Gateman	D	L	23	1975	Southampton, Ontario
10	(United States)	Alan Hangsleben	D	L	23	1975	Warroad, Minnesota
29	(Canada)	Paul Hoganson	G	L	26	1975	Toronto, Ontario
5	(United States)	Paul Hurley	D	R	29	1972	Melrose, Massachusetts
30	(Canada)	Bruce Landon	G	L	26	1972	Kingston, Ontario
2	(Canada)	Rick Ley	D	L	27	1972	Orillia, Ontario
11	(United States)	Bob McManama	C	L	24	1975	Belmont, Massachusetts
16	(Canada)	Fred O'Donnell	RW	R	26	1974	Kingston, Ontario
12	(Canada)	Rosaire Paiement	C	R	27	1975	Earlton, Ontario
4	(United States)	Larry Pleau	LW	L	29	1972	Lynn, Massachusetts
35	(United States)	Cap Raeder	G	L	22	1975	Needham, Massachusetts
–	(Canada)	Steve Richardson	LW	L	27	1975	Olds, Alberta
14	(United States)	Doug Roberts	D	R	33	1975	Detroit, Michigan
7	(United States)	Gordie Roberts	D	L	18	1975	Detroit, Michigan
17	(Canada)	Mike Rogers	C	L	21	1975	Calgary, Alberta
3	(Canada)	Brad Selwood	D	L	28	1972	Leamington, Ontario
20	(Canada)	Garry Swain	C	L	28	1974	Welland, Ontario
25	(United States)	Jim Troy	RW	R	23	1975	Boston, Massachusetts
8	(Canada)	Tom Webster	RW	R	27	1972	Kirkland Lake, Ontario

== Draft picks ==
New England's draft picks at the 1975 WHA Amateur Draft.

Round	#	Player	Nationality	College/Junior/Club team (League)
1	13	Terry McDonald (C)	Canada	Edmonton Oil Kings (WCHL)
2	28	Danny Arndt (LW)	Canada	Saskatoon Blades (WCHL)
3	43	Matti Hagman (C)	Finland	HIFK (SM-sarja)
4	58	Derek Spring (F)	Canada	Brandon Wheat Kings (WCHL)
5	72	Gary McFadyen (RW)	Canada	Hull Festivals (QMJHL)
6	86	Terry Martin (F)	Canada	London Knights (OHA)
7	99	John Tweedle (F)	Canada	Lake Superior State University (CCHA)
8	111	Mike Harazny (D)	Canada	Regina Pats (WCHL)
9	123	Dave Norris (LW)	Canada	Hamilton Fincups (OHA)
10	136	Paul Stevenson (F)	United States	Brown University (ECAC)
11	149	Clark Jantzie (F)	Canada	University of Alberta (CWUAA)

== See also ==
- 1975–76 WHA season
