= List of Edmonton Oilers head coaches =

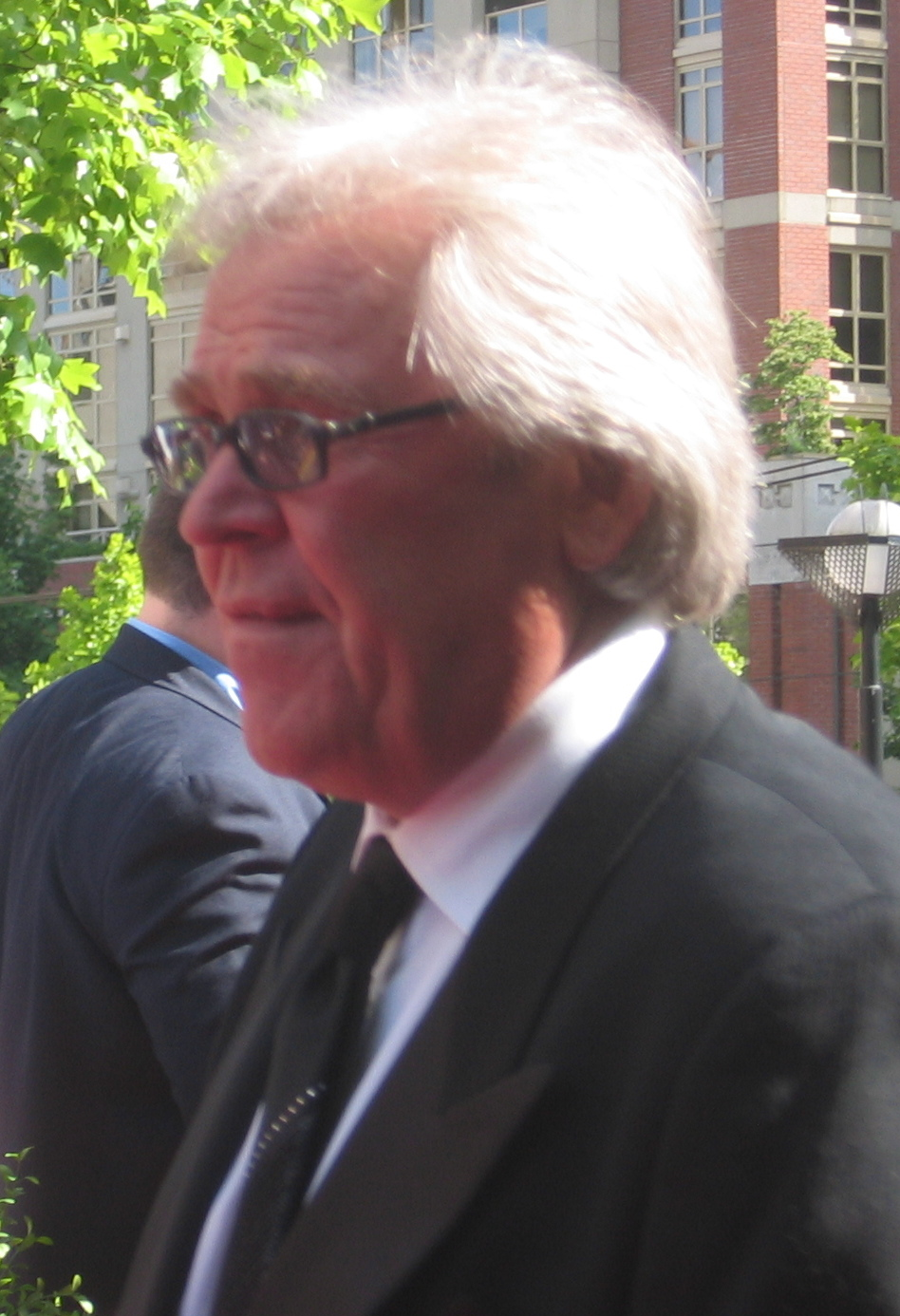
Glen Sather coached the Oilers for 842 regular games and 126 playoff games in the NHL.

The Edmonton Oilers are a professional ice hockey team based in Edmonton. They play in the Pacific Division of the Western Conference in the National Hockey League (NHL). The Oilers were established in 1972 as part of the World Hockey Association (WHA) and joined the NHL as one of four franchises during the 1979 NHL expansion. There have been 23 head coaches in their franchise history; seven during their time in the WHA (1972–1979) and seventeen during their time in the NHL (1979–present).

The Oilers had seven different head coaches during the seven seasons that they played in the WHA. Ray Kinasewich was the first head coach for over 30 games of the original Alberta Oilers, with Hall of Famer (and Top 100 Players of All Time) Glenn Hall as the team's first assistant coach. Bill Hunter, who was the team's owner and general manager at the time served three terms. Glen Sather became a player-coach during the 1976–77 season, but retired as a player at the end of the year. Sather then coached the team for two more seasons in the WHA, and maintained the position when the Oilers were admitted as an expansion franchise into the NHL.

Since joining the NHL for the 1979–80 season, the Oilers have had 19 different head coaches. Sather has the most games coached and most wins as head coach. Sather stepped down before the 1980–81 season, but after the Oilers started the season with only four wins in their first eighteen games he returned to the bench. Sather remained head coach for the remainder of that season plus eight more seasons, during which time the team won four Stanley Cups, in 1984, 1985, 1987 and 1988. For the 1985–86 NHL season, Sather won the Jack Adams Award for the NHL coach "adjudged to have contributed the most to his team's success". Sather stepped down as coach a second time after the 1988–89 season, and John Muckler coached the 1990 championship team. Sather would have one more stint as head coach, relieving Ted Green after the team posted just three victories in the first 24 games of the 1993–94 season. Sather was inducted into the Hockey Hall of Fame in 1997 in the builder category.

Former Oilers head coach, Craig MacTavish, played for the team from 1985 to 1994. He was a member of the 1987, 1988, and 1990 Stanley Cup winning teams, and he was team captain from 1992 to 1994. As of the 2025–26 season, he ranks second in the number of Oilers games coached.

The current head coach is Mike Babcock, who was hired on June 23, 2026.

== Key ==
GC	Games coached
W	Wins
L	Losses
T	Ties
OT	Overtime Loss

Win % and Pts %

Win–loss percentage = $\frac{W+\frac{1}{2}T}{GC}$ and Points percentage = $\frac{W+\frac{1}{2}T+\frac{1}{2}OT}{GC}$

- For the 1999–2000 to 2003–04 seasons, an extra point was awarded for overtime losses. These totals are included as losses for the purpose of calculating win–loss percentage.
- Since the 2005–06 NHL season, ties are no longer recorded, but single points for overtime or shootout losses are still awarded. These totals are included as ties for the purpose of calculating win–loss percentage.

== Coaches ==
=== WHA ===
No.	Name	Seasons	Regular season					Playoffs			
No.	Name	Seasons	GC	W	L	T	Win %	GC	W	L	Win %
1	Ray Kinasewich	1972–73	45	20	23	2	.467	—	—	—	—
2	Bill Hunter	1972–73	26	14	11	1	.558	1	0	1	.000
3	Brian Shaw	1973–74 to 1974–75	137	68	63	6	.518	5	1	4	.200
—	Bill Hunter	1974–75	19	6	12	1	.342	—	—	—	—
4	Clare Drake	1975–76	48	18	28	2	.396	—	—	—	—
—	Bill Hunter	1975–76	33	9	21	3	.318	4	0	4	.000
5	Bep Guidolin	1976–77	63	25	36	2	.413	—	—	—	—
6	Glen Sather	1976–77 to 1978–79	178	95	76	7	.553	23	8	15	.348

=== NHL ===
No.	Name	Seasons	Regular season						Playoffs			
No.	Name	Seasons	GC	W	L	T	OT	Pts %	GC	W	L	Win %
1	Glen Sather	1979–80	80	28	39	13	—	.431	3	0	3	.000
2	Bryan Watson	1980–81 (Note: Watson coached the first 18 games of the 1980–81 season and was replaced by Sather.)	18	4	9	5	—	.361	—	—	—	—
—	Glen Sather	1980–81 to 1988–89	702	414	202	86	—	.651	123	89	34	.724
3	John Muckler	1989–90 to 1990–91	160	75	65	20	—	.531	40	25	15	.625
4	Ted Green	1991–92 to 1993–94 (Note: Green coached the first 24 games of the 1993–94 season and was replaced by Sather.)	188	65	102	21	—	.402	16	8	8	.500
—	Glen Sather	1993–94	60	22	27	11	—	.458	—	—	—	—
5	George Burnett	1994–95 (Note: Burnett coached the first 35 games of the 1994–95 season and was replaced by Low.)	35	12	20	3	—	.386	—	—	—	—
6	Ron Low	1994–95 to 1998–99	341	139	162	40	—	.466	28	10	18	.357
7	Kevin Lowe	1999–2000	82	32	26	16	8	.537 (Note: Lowe's win/loss/tie record is 32–34–16 for a points percentage of .537.)	5	1	4	.200
8	Craig MacTavish	2000–01 to 2008–09	656	301	252	47	56	.537 (Note: MacTavish's win/loss/tie record is 301–273–82 for a points percentage of .537.)	36	19	17	.528
9	Pat Quinn	2009–10	82	27	47	—	8	.378	—	—	—	—
10	Tom Renney	2010–11 to 2011–12	164	57	85	—	22	.415	—	—	—	—
11	Ralph Krueger	2012–13	48	19	22	—	7	.469	—	—	—	—
12	Dallas Eakins	2013–14 to 2014–15 (Note: Eakins coached the first 31 games of the 2014–15 season and was replaced by Nelson.)	113	36	63	—	14	.381	—	—	—	—
13	Todd Nelson	2014–15	51	17	25	—	9	.422	—	—	—	—
14	Todd McLellan	2015–16 to 2018–19 (Note: McLellan coached the first 20 games of the 2018–19 season and was replaced by Hitchcock.)	266	123	119	—	24	.502	13	7	6	.538
15	Ken Hitchcock	2018–19	62	26	28	—	8	.484	—	—	—	—
16	Dave Tippett	2019–20 to 2021–22 (Note: Tippett coached the first 44 games of the 2021–22 season and was replaced by Woodcroft.)	171	95	62	—	14	.596	8	1	7	.125
17	Jay Woodcroft	2021–22 to 2023–24 (Note: Woodcroft coached the first 13 games of the 2023–24 season and was replaced by Knoblauch.)	133	79	41	—	13	.643	28	14	14	.500
18	Kris Knoblauch	2023–24 to 2025–26	233	135	77	—	21	.624	53	31	22	.585
19	Mike Babcock	2026–27 to present	—	—	—	—	—	—	—	—	—	—
