= Imperial, Saskatchewan =

Town in Saskatchewan, Canada

Imperial
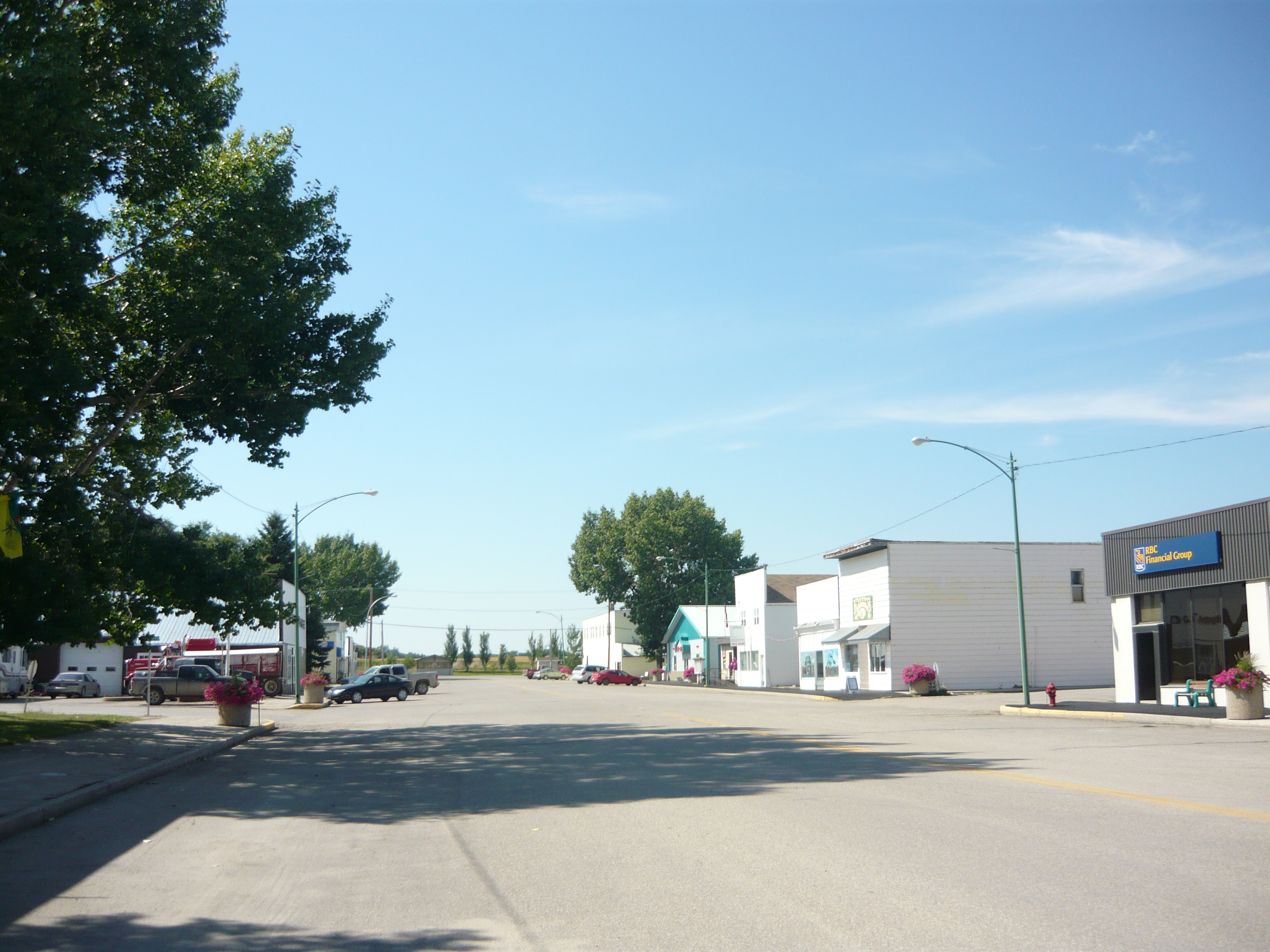
- Royal Street

- Location of Imperial Imperial (Canada)
- Coordinates: 51.344°N 105.443°W
- Country: Canada
- Province: Saskatchewan
- Census division: 11
- Rural Municipality: Big Arm
- Post office Founded: March 1, 1907
- Incorporated (Village): July 4, 1911
- Incorporated (Town): April 1, 1962

Government
  - Mayor: Ted Abrey
  - Town Administrator: Joslin Freeman
  - Governing body: Imperial Town Council

Area
  - Total: 1.20 km^{2} (0.46 sq mi)

Population (2021)
  - Total: 372
  - Density: 308.7/km^{2} (800/sq mi)
- Time zone: CST
- Postal code: S0G 2J0
- Area code: 306
- Highways: Highway 2
- Waterways: Last Mountain Lake
- Website: Town of Imperial

Imperial is a town in the Canadian province of Saskatchewan. The town is located along Highway 2.

== Demographics ==
In the 2021 Census of Population conducted by Statistics Canada, Imperial had a population of 372 living in 166 of its 183 total private dwellings, a change of 3.3% from its 2016 population of 360. With a land area of 1.2 km^{2} (0.46 sq mi), it had a population density of 310.0/km^{2} (802.9/sq mi) in 2021.

Canada census – Imperial community profile

	2021	2016	2011
Population	372 (+3.3% from 2016)	360 (3.2% from 2011)	349 (+8.7% from 2006)
Land area	1.20 km^{2} (0.46 sq mi)	1.23 km^{2} (0.47 sq mi)	1.23 km^{2} (0.47 sq mi)
Population density	308.7/km^{2} (800/sq mi)	292.4/km^{2} (757/sq mi)	283.5/km^{2} (734/sq mi)
Median age	50.0 (M: 48.8, F: 51.2)		52.5 (M: 50.8, F: 55.3)
Private dwellings	183 (total) 166 (occupied)	182 (total)	176 (total)
Median household income	$66,500

References: 2021 2016 2011

== Notable people ==
- Connor Ingram, National Hockey League goaltender for the Edmonton Oilers
- Kris Knoblauch, National Hockey League head coach for the Edmonton Oilers

== See also ==
- List of communities in Saskatchewan
- List of towns in Saskatchewan
