= Bep Guidolin =

Canadian ice hockey player

- Born: December 9, 1925 Thorold, Ontario, Canada
- Died: November 24, 2008 (aged 82) Barrie, Ontario, Canada
- Height: 5 ft 8 in (173 cm)
- Weight: 175 lb (79 kg; 12 st 7 lb)
- Position: Left wing
- Shot: Left
- Played for: Chicago Black Hawks; Detroit Red Wings; Boston Bruins
- Coached for: Boston Bruins; Edmonton Oilers; Kansas City Scouts
- Playing career: 1942–1952
- Coaching career: 1957–1982

Armand "Bep" Guidolin (December 9, 1925 – November 24, 2008) was a Canadian ice hockey player and coach. He is notable for being the youngest player in National Hockey League history.

Guidolin stood 5'8" at 175 lbs, and was a left-shooting left winger in the NHL. He later went on to a coaching career. He was nicknamed "Bep" because his mother spoke Italian and very little English. Armand was the baby of the family and his mother pronounced baby as "beppy". The nickname stuck and was shortened to "Bep". He is the cousin of fellow NHL player and coach Aldo Guidolin.

== Early life ==
Guidolin and his family moved to Timmins when he was young. It was there that he learned how to skate at the age of 13. His abilities excelled through practicing on local outdoor rinks. When the NHL lost many of its talented players to the Second World War, Guidolin's talents caught the eyes of pro scouts as being a viable replacement option.

== Playing career ==
Guidolin played junior hockey with the Oshawa Generals of the OHA, playing in the Memorial Cup in 1942. Later that year he became the youngest player (16 years, 11 months) to play in an NHL game, on November 12, 1942.

His quick rise to the NHL was a direct result of World War II. The Boston Bruins were in dire need of replacements to fill the roster holes created by so many players leaving for military service. In 1944, his eligibility for military service brought a one-year break from his NHL career.

Guidolin also played for the Detroit Red Wings and the Chicago Black Hawks. Armand was an ardent supporter of the formation of a players' union, which led to the early demise of his NHL career in 1952. He played for nine years in the minors, then retired to a coaching career.

== Coaching career ==
Guidolin coached the Belleville McFarlands, winning the Allan Cup in 1958, and the World Championship in 1959. In 1965 he became the coach of his former junior team the Oshawa Generals, featuring 17-year-old future Hockey Hall of Fame defenceman Bobby Orr. He led the Generals to the Memorial Cup final in 1966 versus the Edmonton Oil Kings. Guidolin later coached the London Knights of the OHL, Boston Bruins and the Kansas City Scouts of the NHL, the Edmonton Oilers of the World Hockey Association, and the Boston Braves and Philadelphia Firebirds of the American Hockey League. It was a dream of Guidolin's to coach in the NHL, which became a reality when he got the opportunity to coach the Boston Bruins midway through the 1972–73 season when he was bench boss for 26 games. He coached Boston again in 1973–74, leading the Bruins to the Stanley Cup Finals. Guidolin also coached the Kansas City Scouts for the 1974–75 and 1975–76 campaigns. (Legree, 2018).

Guidolin also coached the Timmins Northstars of the Northland Intermediate Hockey League which went on to the Hardy Cup Finals for the All Canadians.

He also coached a Junior C team for a short time out of Angus Ontario known as the Essa 80s at the end of his career.

== Career statistics ==
=== Regular season and playoffs ===
			Regular season					Playoffs
Season	Team	League	GP	G	A	Pts	PIM	GP	G	A	Pts	PIM
1941–42	Oshawa Generals	OHA Jr	21	4	13	17	38	11	0	3	3	22
1941–42	Oshawa Generals	M-Cup	—	—	—	—	—	11	5	5	10	56
1942–43	Boston Bruins	NHL	42	7	15	22	53	9	0	4	4	12
1943–44	Boston Bruins	NHL	47	17	25	42	58	—	—	—	—	—
1944–45	Newmarket Navy	TNDHL	7	11	12	23	18	8	9	8	17	23
1944–45	Toronto Army Shamrocks	TIHL	18	13	10	23	61	3	2	2	4	10
1944–45	Toronto Army Daggers	OHA Sr	2	1	1	2	0	—	—	—	—	—
1945–46	Boston Bruins	NHL	50	15	17	32	62	10	5	2	7	13
1946–47	Boston Bruins	NHL	56	10	13	23	73	3	0	1	1	6
1947–48	Detroit Red Wings	NHL	58	12	10	22	78	2	0	0	0	4
1948–49	Detroit Red Wings	NHL	4	0	0	0	0	—	—	—	—	—
1948–49	Chicago Black Hawks	NHL	56	4	17	21	116	—	—	—	—	—
1949–50	Chicago Black Hawks	NHL	70	17	34	51	42	—	—	—	—	—
1950–51	Chicago Black Hawks	NHL	69	12	22	34	56	—	—	—	—	—
1951–52	Chicago Black Hawks	NHL	67	13	18	31	78	—	—	—	—	—
1952–53	Syracuse Warriors	AHL	23	1	8	9	24	3	0	0	0	8
1952–53	Ottawa Senators	QSHL	43	9	24	33	54	—	—	—	—	—
1953–54	Ottawa Senators	QHL	71	18	38	56	148	—	—	—	—	—
1954–55	Ottawa Senators	QHL	19	5	12	17	77	—	—	—	—	—
1954–55	North Bay Trappers	NOHA	20	8	12	20	40	13	2	6	8	36
1955–56	Val d'Or Miners	QUE Sr	—	—	—	—	—	—	—	—	—	—
1955–56	North Bay Trappers	NOHA	1	1	2	3	2	—	—	—	—	—
1956–57	Bellville McFarlands	OHA Sr	48	16	29	45	156	—	—	—	—	—
1957–58	Windsor Bulldogs	OHASr	7	2	6	8	24	—	—	—	—	—
1957–58	Bellville McFarlands	OHA Sr	35	12	18	30	60	—	—	—	—	—
1958–59	Kingston Merchants	EAOHL	43	11	26	37	62	12	0	4	4	24
1960–61	Omaha Knights	IHL	64	14	33	47	62	—	—	—	—	—
NHL totals			519	107	171	278	616	24	5	7	12	35

== Coaching statistics ==
=== NHL ===
† - replaced mid-season
‡ – mid-season replacement

Team	Year	Regular season						Postseason				
Team	Year	G	W	L	T	Pts	Finish	G	W	L	Win%	Result
Boston Bruins	1972–73‡	26	20	6	0	(40)	2nd in East	5	1	4	.769	Lost in quarter-finals
Boston Bruins	1973–74	78	52	17	9	113	1st in East	16	14	10	.724	Lost in Cup Finals
Kansas City Scouts	1974–75	80	15	54	11	41	5th in Smythe	-	-	-	.256	Missed playoffs
Kansas City Scouts	1975–76 †	45	11	30	4	(26)	5th in Smythe	-	-	-	.289	(resigned)
Total		229	98	107	24	220		19	21	15	.480	2 playoff appearances

=== WHA ===
Team	Year	Regular season						Postseason
Team	Year	G	W	L	T	Pts	Division Rank	Result
Edmonton Oilers	1976–77	63	25	36	2	(72)	4th in West	(fired)
Total	63	25	36	2	72			

=== WOJBHL ===
Team	Year	Regular season						Postseason
Team	Year	G	W	L	T	Pts	Pct	Result
Windsor Spitfires	1964-65	40	11	27	2	24	0.300	Out of playoffs
Total		40	27	2	24			

=== OHA ===
Team	Year	Regular season						Postseason
Team	Year	G	W	L	T	Pts	Pct	Result
Oshawa Generals	1965-66	48	22	18	8	52	0.542	Won J. Ross Robertson Cup
London Knights	1969-70	54	22	25	7	51	0.472	Lost in round 2
London Knights	1970-71	62	19	35	8	46	0.371	Lost in round 1
Total		164	63	78	23	149		

=== AHL ===
Team	Year	Regular season						Postseason
Team	Year	G	W	L	T	Pts	Pct	Result
Boston Braves	1971–72	76	41	21	14	96	0.632	Lost in round 2
Philadelphia Firebirds	1978-79	80	23	49	8	54	0.338	Out of Playoffs
Total		156	64	73	22	150		

=== OHL ===
Team	Year	Regular season						Postseason
Team	Year	G	W	L	T	Pts	Division Rank	Result
Brantford Alexanders	1981-82	68	25	41	2	52	5th in Emms	Lost in quarter-finals
Total		68	25	41	2	52		

Bep also coached the Essa 80s junior C team out of Angus Ontario .

=== OHASr ===
Team	Year	Regular season						Postseason
Team	Year	G	W	L	T	Pts	Pct	Result
Barrie Broncos	1983-84							

Preceded by Bill Hunter	General manager of the Edmonton Oilers; 1976–77	Succeeded by Brian Conacher
Preceded by Tom Johnson	Head coach of the Boston Bruins; 1972–74	Succeeded by Don Cherry
Preceded by Position created	Head coach of the Kansas City Scouts; 1974–75	Succeeded by Sid Abel
Preceded by Clare Drake	Head coach of the Edmonton Oilers; 1976–77	Succeeded by Glen Sather
