= Kris Knoblauch =

Canadian ice hockey player and coach

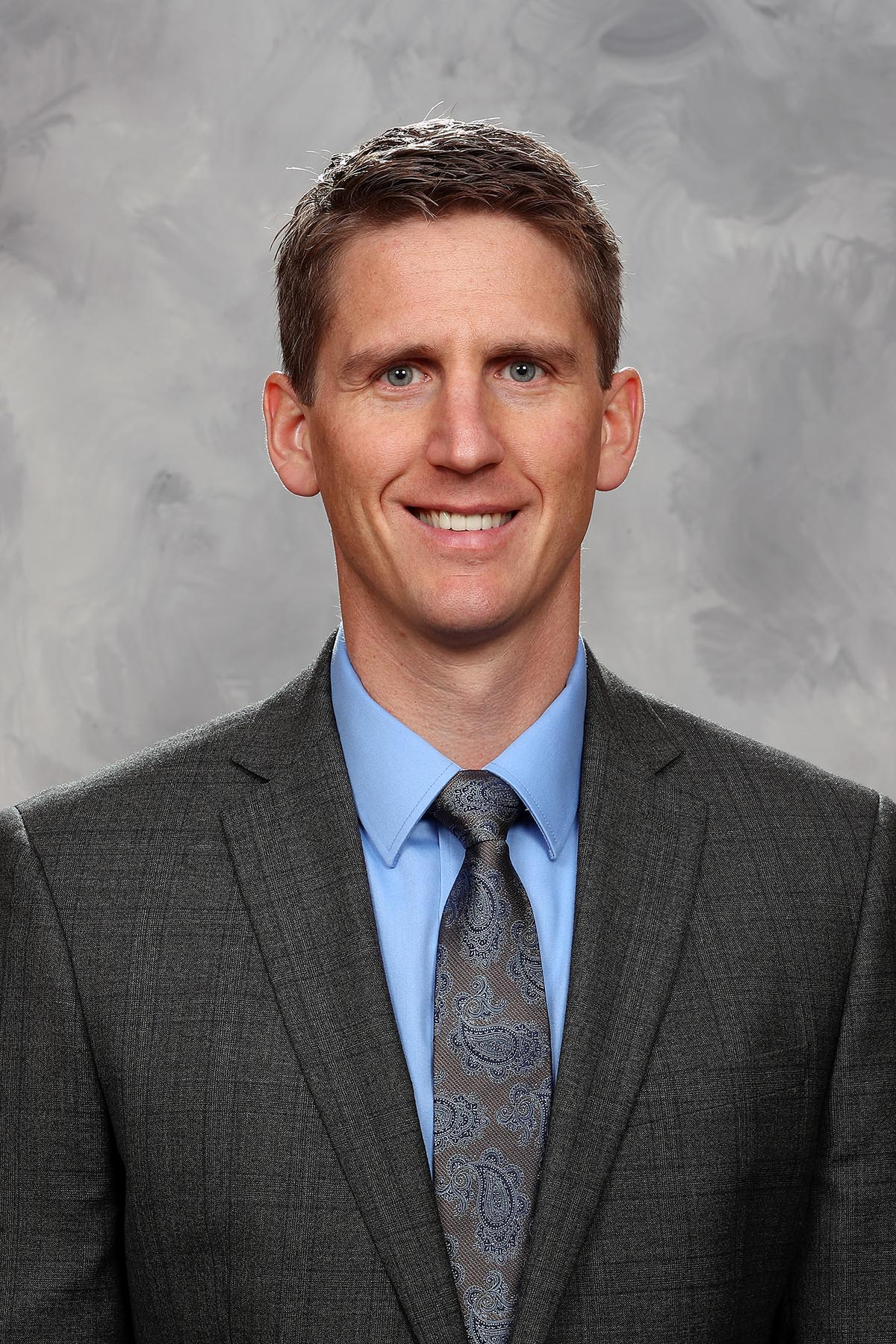
- Knoblauch in 2019
- Born: September 24, 1978 (age 47) Imperial, Saskatchewan, Canada
- Height: 6 ft 4 in (193 cm)
- Weight: 210 lb (95 kg; 15 st 0 lb)
- Position: Winger
- Shot: Left
- Played for: Asheville Smoke; Austin Ice Bats; Bisons de Neuilly-sur-Marne
- Coached for: Edmonton Oilers
- NHL draft: 166th overall, 1997; New York Islanders
- Playing career: 1999–2006
- Coaching career: 2006–present

Kris Knoblauch (born September 24, 1978) is a Canadian professional ice hockey coach and former player who most recently was the head coach for the Edmonton Oilers of the National Hockey League (NHL). He had previously been the head coach of the Hartford Wolf Pack of the American Hockey League (AHL).

He had a total of 13 seasons of coaching experience before joining Hartford, including two seasons as an assistant coach with the Philadelphia Flyers of the NHL and seven years as a head coach in the Canadian junior leagues. He compiled a record of 298–130–16–13 during that time. Knoblauch coached the Oilers to appearances in the Stanley Cup Final in 2024 and 2025.

== Playing career ==
Knoblauch is from Imperial, Saskatchewan. He was a seventh-round pick, 166th overall, of the New York Islanders in the 1997 NHL entry draft, but never played at the NHL level. Playing in the position of winger, Knoblauch played parts of four seasons of junior hockey in the Western Hockey League (WHL) from 1995 to 1998 with the Red Deer Rebels, Edmonton Ice and Lethbridge Hurricanes. He then played for five seasons with the University of Alberta Golden Bears from 1999 to 2003, during which time he registered 117 points (38 goals and 79 assists) in 102 games. He was part of the team that won a National Championship during the 1999–00 season. Knoblauch played professionally with the Austin Ice Bats of the Central Hockey League, before finishing his playing career in France as a member of the Bisons de Neuilly-sur-Marne.

== Coaching career ==
Knoblauch began his coaching career as an assistant coach with the Prince Albert Raiders of the WHL during the 2006–07 season. He became an assistant coach with the Kootenay Ice of the WHL for three seasons from 2007 to 2010, becoming the Ice's head coach in 2010.

=== Kootenay Ice ===
In his first season with Kootenay during the 2010–11 season, the team posted a 46–21–1–4 record in the regular season, won 16 of 19 WHL playoff games and won the Ed Chynoweth Cup. Knoblauch continued his success with the Ice the following season, as the team posted a 36–26–5 record, but was swept by the Edmonton Oil Kings in the first round of the WHL playoffs.

Knoblauch interviewed for the vacant head coaching position with the University of Alberta Golden Bears men's ice hockey team and did so without consulting the Ice. Despite being on the Golden Bears coaching job shortlist, Knoblauch was relieved of his head coaching duties with the Ice on May 24, 2012.

=== Erie Otters ===
Knoblauch became the head coach of the Erie Otters of the Ontario Hockey League (OHL), a position he held from 2012 to 2017.

During his four full seasons with the Erie Otters, the team had a 204–58–7–3 record (.768 points percentage) and won at least 50 games each season. They were the first team in Canadian Hockey League history to post four consecutive 50-win seasons. Under Knoblauch's leadership, Erie won the OHL Championship in the 2016–17 season. Additionally, the Otters made it to the OHL Championship in the 2014–15 season and won the Hamilton Spectator Trophy in recognition of having the OHL's best regular season record in consecutive seasons in 2015–16 and 2016–17. Knoblauch was the recipient of the Matt Leyden Trophy in 2015–16, making him OHL Coach of the Year that season. He also made OHL's Second All-Star Team in 2013–14.

Knoblauch was the head coach for Canada-Red at the 2015 World U17 Hockey Challenge and assistant coach with Canada at the 2017 IIHF World U20 Championship, where Canada earned a silver medal. During his seven total seasons as head coach of the Kootenay Ice and Erie Otters, Knoblauch compiled a record of 298–130–16–13, and coached such players as Connor McDavid, Alex DeBrincat, André Burakovsky, Connor Brown, Erik Černák, Anthony Cirelli, Travis Dermott, Sam Reinhart and Dylan Strome.

=== Philadelphia Flyers ===
Knoblauch was an assistant coach for the Philadelphia Flyers during the 2017–18 and 2018–19 seasons.

=== Hartford Wolf Pack ===
The New York Rangers organization announced on July 29, 2019, that Knoblauch had been appointed the head coach of the Hartford Wolf Pack, the Rangers' AHL affiliate team. This marked the first time Knoblauch became a head coach at the professional level. Knoblauch replaced Keith McCambridge, fired after two seasons as Hartford coach. Knoblauch was the seventh coach in Wolf Pack history. On March 17, 2021, Knoblauch served as the New York Rangers' head coach when David Quinn and his staff were placed on the COVID-19 protocol list. In Knoblauch's first game as head coach, the Rangers beat the Philadelphia Flyers 9–0 at Madison Square Garden. Quinn was out for six games total, the Rangers won four games and lost two under Knoblauch.

=== Edmonton Oilers ===
On November 12, 2023, the Edmonton Oilers announced that they had hired Knoblauch as their head coach to replace the recently fired Jay Woodcroft. In his first year as Oilers head coach, Knoblauch led the team to the 2024 Stanley Cup Final against the Florida Panthers. After rallying back from a 3–0 series deficit, the Oilers were ultimately defeated in the pivotal seventh game.

General manager Ken Holland left at the expiration of his contract and was replaced in that capacity by Stan Bowman. Nonetheless, Knoblauch's second season was just as successful, leading the Oilers to the 2025 Stanley Cup Final—the Oilers' first back-to-back appearances in 40 years, in a rematch against the Panthers. This series saw the Oilers have home-ice advantage for the majority of their games, but they would again experience defeat at the hands of the Panthers, this time in six games.

On October 3, 2025, the Oilers announced they had agreed to a three-year extension with Knoblauch, keeping him under contract until the end of the 2028–29 NHL season. However, at the conclusion of the season, Knoblauch was fired after losing to the Anaheim Ducks in six games in the first round of the 2026 Stanley Cup playoffs. His release garnered mixed reactions from local news outlets; some found the move poorly handled while others believed the firing was necessary.

== Career statistics ==
=== Playing career ===
			Regular season					Playoffs
Season	Team	League	GP	G	A	Pts	PIM	GP	G	A	Pts	PIM
1995–96	Red Deer Rebels	WHL	1	0	0	0	0	—	—	—	—	—
1996–97	Red Deer Rebels	WHL	43	4	14	18	29	—	—	—	—	—
1996–97	Edmonton Ice	WHL	24	7	7	14	73	—	—	—	—	—
1997–98	Edmonton Ice	WHL	72	18	23	41	193	—	—	—	—	—
1998–99	Kootenay Ice	WHL	21	7	3	10	36	—	—	—	—	—
1998–99	Lethbridge Hurricanes	WHL	52	20	22	42	102	4	1	3	4	6
1998–99	Asheville Smoke	UHL	—	—	—	—	—	4	0	0	0	5
1999–2000	Alberta Golden Bears	CWUAA	47	25	26	51	30	—	—	—	—	—
2000–01	Alberta Golden Bears	CWUAA	42	31	34	65	12	—	—	—	—	—
2001–02	Alberta Golden Bears	CWUAA	35	13	30	43	12	—	—	—	—	—
2002–03	Alberta Golden Bears	CWUAA	31	11	24	35	22	—	—	—	—	—
2003–04	Alberta Golden Bears	CWUAA	36	14	25	39	32	—	—	—	—	—
2004–05	Austin Ice Bats	CHL	60	18	22	40	76	—	—	—	—	—
2005–06	Bisons de Neuilly-sur-Marne	Division 1	28	29	17	46	24	—	—	—	—	—

== Head coaching record ==
=== NHL ===
Team	Year	Regular season						Postseason			
Team	Year	G	W	L	OTL	Pts	Finish	W	L	Win %	Result
EDM	2023–24*	69	46	18	5	(97)	2nd in Pacific	15	10	.600	Lost in Stanley Cup Final (FLA)
EDM	2024–25	82	48	29	5	101	3rd in Pacific	14	8	.636	Lost in Stanley Cup Final (FLA)
EDM	2025–26	82	41	30	11	93	2nd in Pacific	2	4	.333	Lost in first round (ANA)
Total		233	135	77	21			31	22	.585	3 playoff appearances

* – Mid-season replacement

=== Other leagues ===
Team	Year	League	Regular season						Postseason
Team	Year	League	G	W	L	OTL	Pts	Finish	Result
KOO	2010–11	WHL	72	46	21	5	97	3rd in Central	Won Ed Chynoweth Cup (POR)
KOO	2011–12	WHL	72	36	26	10	82	4th in Central	Lost in first round (EDM)
ERI	2012–13	OHL	29	12	25	4	28	5th in Midwest	Did not qualify
ERI	2013–14	OHL	68	52	14	2	106	2nd in Midwest	Lost in third round (GUE)
ERI	2014–15	OHL	68	50	14	4	104	1st in Midwest	Lost in J. Ross Robertson Cup Finals (OSH)
ERI	2015–16	OHL	68	52	15	1	105	1st in Midwest	Lost in third round (LDN)
ERI	2016–17	OHL	68	50	15	3	103	1st in Midwest	Won J. Ross Robertson Cup (MSA)
HFD	2019–20	AHL	62	31	20	11	73	4th in Atlantic	Season cancelled due to COVID-19 pandemic
HFD	2020–21	AHL	24	14	9	1	29	2nd in Atlantic	No playoffs due to COVID-19 pandemic
HFD	2021–22	AHL	72	32	32	8	72	7th in Atlantic	Missed playoffs
HFD	2022–23	AHL	72	35	26	11	81	5th in Atlantic	Lost in third round (HER)
WHL total			144	82	47	15	179		2 playoffs appearances
OHL total			301	216	83	14	446		4 playoffs appearances
AHL total			230	112	87	31	255		1 playoff appearance

Preceded by Jay Woodcroft	Head coach of the Edmonton Oilers; 2023–2026	Succeeded by Mike Babcock
