= Jay Woodcroft =

Canadian ice hockey player and coach

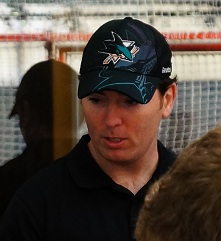
- Woodcroft with the San Jose Sharks in 2012
- Born: August 11, 1976 (age 50) Toronto, Ontario, Canada
- Height: 6 ft 1 in (185 cm)
- Weight: 192 lb (87 kg; 13 st 10 lb)
- Position: Centre
- Shot: Right
- Played for: Jackson Bandits; Missouri River Otters; Flint Generals; Anchorage Aces; Corpus Christi IceRays
- Coached for: Edmonton Oilers
- NHL draft: Undrafted
- Playing career: 2000–2005
- Coaching career: 2005–present

Jay Woodcroft (born August 11, 1976) is a Canadian professional ice hockey coach and former player. Woodcroft is an assistant coach of the Anaheim Ducks of the National Hockey League.

== Early life ==
Woodcroft was a child actor at an early age, appearing in the 1979 pilot episode of The Littlest Hobo when he was under two years old. He also played Bobby Moore in the 1986 film Separate Vacations.

== Playing career ==
After completing four seasons at the University of Alabama-Huntsville, Woodcroft played four seasons of minor league ice hockey in the United States, and one in the German Oberliga.

== Coaching career ==
Woodcroft was hired as a video coach for the Detroit Red Wings in 2005; he won the Stanley Cup in 2008 as Detroit's video coach. Later that year, he joined the San Jose Sharks as an assistant coach under head coach Todd McLellan.

In April 2015, the Sharks announced that they had agreed to part ways with head coach McLellan, assistant coaches Jim Johnson and Woodcroft, as well as video coordinator Brett Heimlich. Two months later, the Edmonton Oilers appointed Woodcroft and Johnson as assistant coaches, rejoining newly appointed head coach McLellan in Edmonton.

On April 27, 2018, Woodcroft was appointed the head coach of the Bakersfield Condors, the Oilers' American Hockey League (AHL) affiliate. Under his guidance, the Condors had a 105–71–21 record during the regular season and captured the Pacific Division playoff championship during the 2020–21 season. Bakersfield also captured the Pacific Division regular season title in 2019.

On February 10, 2022, the Oilers announced they fired Dave Tippett from the team, and named Woodcroft interim head coach. Following a successful run to the Western Conference Finals, on June 21, Edmonton signed Woodcroft to an extension to remain as team's head coach.

On November 12, 2023, the Oilers fired Woodcroft after the team started 3–9–1. He was replaced as head coach by Kris Knoblauch, who had been the head coach of the Hartford Wolf Pack of the AHL.

On April 25, 2024, Woodcroft was named as an assistant coach for the Canadian team at the 2024 IIHF World Championship.

On July 1, 2025, Woodcroft was named as an assistant coach for the Anaheim Ducks, serving on the staff of Ducks' head coach Joel Quenneville.

== Head coaching record ==
Team	Year	Regular season						Postseason			
Team	Year	G	W	L	OTL	Pts	Finish	W	L	Win%	Result
EDM	2021–22	38	26	9	3	(55)	2nd in Pacific	8	8	.500	Lost in Conference Finals (COL)
EDM	2022–23	82	50	23	9	109	2nd in Pacific	6	6	.500	Lost in Second Round (VGK)
EDM	2023–24	13	3	9	1	(7)	Fired	—	—	—	—
Total		133	79	41	13			14	14	.500	2 playoff appearances

Preceded by Dave Tippett	Head coach of the Edmonton Oilers; 2022–2023	Succeeded by Kris Knoblauch
