= Terry Holbrook (ice hockey) =

Canadian ice hockey player

- Born: July 11, 1950 (age 75) Petrolia, Ontario, Canada
- Height: 6 ft 0 in (183 cm)
- Weight: 185 lb (84 kg; 13 st 3 lb)
- Position: Right wing
- Shot: Right
- Played for: Minnesota North Stars; Cleveland Crusaders
- NHL draft: 38th overall, 1970; Los Angeles Kings
- Playing career: 1970–1976

Terry Eugene Holbrook (born July 11, 1950) is a Canadian former professional ice hockey player who played in the National Hockey League (NHL) and World Hockey Association (WHA).

== Early life ==
Holbrook was born in Petrolia, Ontario, but grew up in Watford, Ontario.

== Career ==
Drafted in the third round of the 1970 NHL Amateur Draft by the Los Angeles Kings, Holbrook played parts of two NHL seasons with the Minnesota North Stars. He played the final two seasons of his career with the Cleveland Crusaders of the WHA.

== Career statistics ==
			Regular season					Playoffs
Season	Team	League	GP	G	A	Pts	PIM	GP	G	A	Pts	PIM
1969–70	London Knights	OHA	54	13	15	28	13	12	5	1	6	11
1970–71	Springfield Kings	AHL	40	2	8	10	8	—	—	—	—	—
1970–71	Cleveland Barons	AHL	17	1	7	8	0	8	0	0	0	0
1971–72	Cleveland Barons	AHL	76	7	22	29	16	6	1	0	1	7
1972–73	Cleveland Barons	AHL	51	22	21	43	12	—	—	—	—	—
1972–73	Minnesota North Stars	NHL	21	2	3	5	0	6	0	0	0	0
1973–74	New Haven Nighthawks	AHL	37	15	21	36	18	—	—	—	—	—
1973–74	Minnesota North Stars	NHL	22	1	3	4	4	—	—	—	—	—
1974–75	Cleveland Crusaders	WHA	78	10	13	23	7	5	0	1	1	0
1975–76	Cleveland Crusaders	WHA	15	1	2	3	6	3	0	0	0	0
NHL totals			43	3	6	9	4	6	0	0	0	0
WHA totals			93	11	15	26	13	8	0	1	1	0
