= Brian C. Shaw =

Canadian ice hockey coach (1930–1993)

Brian Campbell Shaw (November 8, 1930 – July 27, 1993) was a Canadian ice hockey coach. He was the head coach of the Edmonton Oilers of the World Hockey Association during the 1973–74 and 1974–75 WHA seasons.

Shaw grew up in Nordegg, Alberta. He played junior ice hockey with the Jasper Place Mohawks.

Shaw formerly coached the Moose Jaw Canucks, St. Catharines Black Hawks, and Edmonton Oil Kings junior teams. He took the Hawks from last place to first place in the Ontario Hockey Association during his first season. A fiery competitor, Shaw was suspended during the 1971–72 season because of an altercation with a fan.

Shaw died in 1993, aged 62, of lymphoma. At the time of his death he had been the owner of the Portland Winterhawks. Following the revelation of the Graham James sexual abuse scandal, Shaw was posthumously accused by several of his former junior players of having made unwanted sexual advances.

On March 6, 2010, Shaw was posthumously inducted into the inaugural class of the Portland Winterhawks' Hall of Fame. The honor was accepted by his nephew, former Winterhawks player Brian "Bunny" Shaw.

== WHA coaching statistics ==
Team	Year	Regular season						Post season
Team	Year	G	W	L	OTL	Pts	Finish	Result
Edmonton Oilers	1973–74	78	38	37	3	79	3rd in West	Lost in semi-finals
Edmonton Oilers	1974–75	59	30	26	3	(6)	5th in Canadian	Fired
NHL Total		137	68	63	6			

Preceded by Bill Hunter	Head coach of the Edmonton Oilers; 1973–75	Succeeded by Clare Drake
