= Dan Spring (ice hockey) =

Canadian ice hockey player

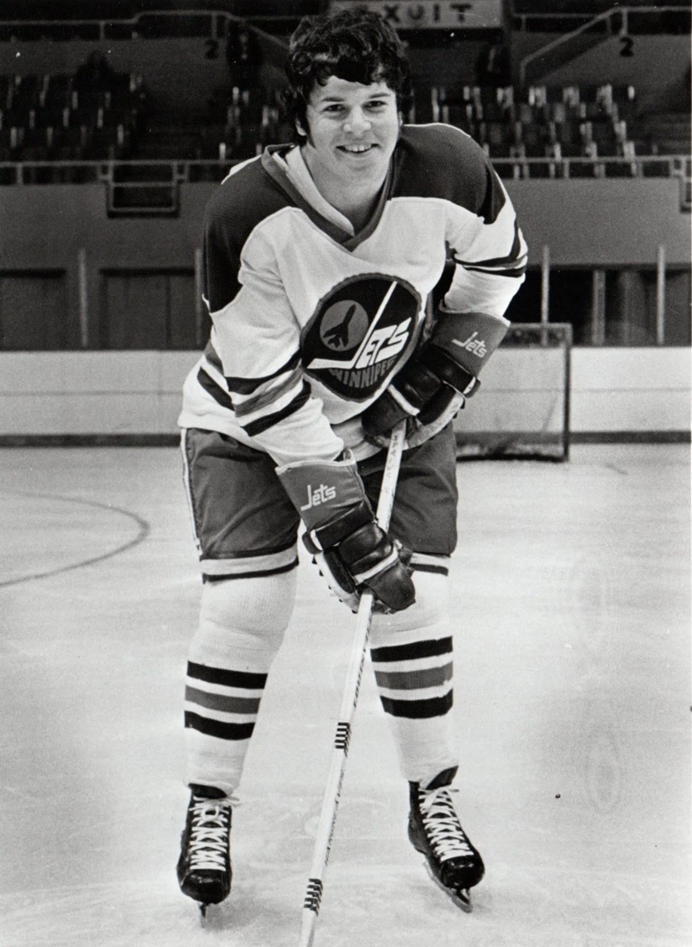
- Spring in 1973 photo
- Born: October 31, 1951 (age 74) Rossland, British Columbia, Canada
- Height: 5 ft 11 in (180 cm)
- Weight: 180 lb (82 kg; 12 st 12 lb)
- Position: Centre
- Shot: Right
- Played for: Winnipeg Jets (WHA); Edmonton Oilers (WHA)
- NHL draft: 12th overall, 1971; Chicago Black Hawks
- Playing career: 1971–1978

Dan Spring (born October 31, 1951) is a Canadian former professional ice hockey forward.

== Early life and education ==
Spring was born in Rossland, British Columbia, and grew up in Cranbrook, British Columbia. He played junior hockey with the Edmonton Oil Kings.

== Career ==
Spring was drafted in the first round, 12th overall, by the Chicago Black Hawks in the 1971 NHL Amateur Draft. He never played in the National Hockey League; however, he played 201 games in the World Hockey Association over three seasons with the Winnipeg Jets and the Edmonton Oilers.

== Career statistics ==
			Regular season					Playoffs
Season	Team	League	GP	G	A	Pts	PIM	GP	G	A	Pts	PIM
1969–70	Edmonton Oil Kings	WCHL	0	0	0	0	0	--	--	--	--	--
1969–70	Oshawa Generals	OHA	8	1	4	5	16	--	--	--	--	--
1970–71	Edmonton Oil Kings	WCHL	65	43	79	122	44	--	--	--	--	--
1971–72	Dallas Black Hawks	CHL	59	10	28	38	35	3	1	2	3	0
1972–73	Dallas Black Hawks	CHL	47	12	21	33	14	--	--	--	--	--
1973–74	Winnipeg Jets	WHA	66	8	16	24	8	4	0	1	1	0
1974–75	Winnipeg Jets	WHA	60	19	24	43	22	--	--	--	--	--
1975–76	Edmonton Oilers	WHA	75	12	11	23	8	2	1	1	2	0
1976–77	Cranbrook Royals	WIHL	0	16	11	27	4	--	--	--	--	--
1977–78	Cranbrook Royals	WIHL	0	26	48	74	0	--	--	--	--	--
WHA totals			201	39	51	90	38	6	1	2	3	0

Preceded by Dan Maloney	Chicago Blackhawks first-round draft pick 1971	Succeeded by Phil Russell
