= Ray Kinasewich =

Canadian ice hockey player and coach (1933–2021)

- Born: September 12, 1933; Smoky Lake, Alberta
- Died: August 30, 2021 (aged 87); Vancouver, British Columbia
- Occupations: Ice hockey player and coach

Roman "Ray" Kinasewich (September 12, 1933 – August 30, 2021) was a Canadian ice hockey player and coach. He was the head coach of the Edmonton Oil Kings team that won the 1966 Memorial Cup and he was the first coach for the Edmonton Oilers in the inaugural 1972–73 season of the World Hockey Association (WHA).

== Playing career ==
Kinasewich played minor professional hockey from 1953 to 1965, with teams in the Western Hockey League (WHL) and American Hockey League (AHL).

He started with the Edmonton Flyers of the WHL before spending two seasons (1956–58) with the Seattle Americans. These would be the two most productive seasons of his career. Playing right wing on a line with Guyle Fielder and Val Fonteyne, he scored 44 goals in 1956–57 and 42 goals in 1957–58, leading the Americans in goal scoring for both seasons. Kinasewich returned to the Flyers for one season before playing for the Hershey Bears of the AHL from 1959–62. The final three years of his playing career were spent playing for Edmonton (for a third time), for the Cleveland Barons (AHL), and for the Seattle Totems (WHL) before retiring in 1965.

Kinasewich turned to coaching for the next season. He led the Edmonton Oil Kings to their second Memorial Cup victory in 1966. He also spent time with the Houston Apollos and was the first coach of the Salt Lake Golden Eagles in 1969–70, but is best known as the first coach of the Edmonton Oilers in the first season of the WHA.

He was hired by Oilers owner Bill Hunter, who had also been the owner of the Oil Kings when Kinasewich coached for them. However, Hunter was dissatisfied with the Oilers' 20–23–2 record to start the 1972–73 WHA season, and he replaced Kinasewich with himself as head coach.

== Career statistics ==
                                            --- Regular Season ---  ---- Playoffs ----
Season   Team                        Lge    GP    G    A  Pts  PIM  GP   G   A Pts PIM
--------------------------------------------------------------------------------------
1950-51  Calgary Buffaloes           WCJHL   0    0    0    0    0  --  --  --  --  --
1951-52  Calgary Buffaloes           WCJHL  44   20   23   43   48  --  --  --  --  --
1953-54  Edmonton Flyers             WHL     1    0    0    0    0  --  --  --  --  --
1953-54  Edmonton Oil Kings          WCJHL   0    0    0    0    0  --  --  --  --  --
1954-55  Edmonton Flyers             WHL     3    0    1    1    0  --  --  --  --  --
1954-55  Nelson Maple Leafs          WIHL   39   28   40   68   64  --  --  --  --  --
1955-56  Edmonton Flyers             WHL    68   16   17   33   41   3   0   0   0   4
1956-57  Seattle Americans           WHL    70   44   38   82   62   6   1   2   3  17
1957-58  Seattle Americans           WHL    70   42   26   68   40   9   5   5  10  10
1958-59  Edmonton Flyers             WHL    63   15   32   47   40   3   0   0   0   2
1959-60  Hershey Bears               AHL    72   24   28   52   20  --  --  --  --  --
1960-61  Hershey Bears               AHL    67   31   24   55   34   8   4   4   8   0
1961-62  Hershey Bears               AHL    69   10   25   35   34   7   2   1   3   0
1962-63  Edmonton Flyers             WHL    68   25   32   57   24   3   0   2   2   0
1963-64  Cleveland Barons            AHL    72   28   30   58   46   9   5   8  13  10
1964-65  Seattle Totems              WHL    61   10   25   35   26   7   1   0   1   6
--------------------------------------------------------------------------------------

== Coaching statistics ==
=== WHA ===
Team	Year	Regular season						Postseason
Team	Year	G	W	L	T	Pts	Finish	Result
Alberta Oilers	1972–73	78	38	37	3	79	5th in WHA West	Lost in preliminary round

=== Other leagues ===
Season  Team                    Lge  Type       GP  W  L  T OTL   Pct 
1967-68 Houston Apollos         CPHL Head Coach 70 28 31 11   0 0.479  
1969-70 Salt Lake Golden Eagles WHL  Head Coach 72 15 43 14   0 0.306  

== See also ==
- List of WHL seasons
- List of AHL seasons

Preceded by Position created	Head coach of the Edmonton Oilers; 1972–73	Succeeded by Bill Hunter
