= Tom Edur =

Canadian ice hockey player

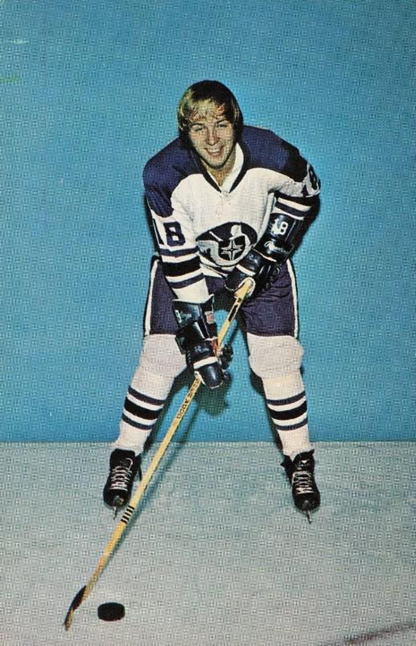
- Born: November 18, 1954 (age 71) Toronto, Ontario, Canada
- Height: 6 ft 1 in (185 cm)
- Weight: 185 lb (84 kg; 13 st 3 lb)
- Position: Defence
- Shot: Right
- Played for: Cleveland Crusaders; Colorado Rockies; Pittsburgh Penguins
- NHL draft: 54th overall, 1974; Boston Bruins
- Playing career: 1973–1978

Toomas Edur (born November 18, 1954) is a Canadian former professional ice hockey player.

== Playing career ==
As a youth, Edur played in the 1966 and 1967 Quebec International Pee-Wee Hockey Tournaments with a minor ice hockey team from Leaside.

Edur was selected by the Boston Bruins in the third round of the 1974 NHL amateur draft, 54th overall, although by that time, he had already made his professional debut in the World Hockey Association with the Cleveland Crusaders rather than in the NHL, as the Crusaders had signed him as an underage junior player before the 1973-74 season. After three seasons in the WHA, Edur joined the NHL with the Colorado Rockies.

In July, 1978 at the age of 24, after just two seasons in the NHL (with Colorado and the Pittsburgh Penguins), Edur retired from professional hockey. Before retiring he had signed with the St. Louis Blues.

Edur was later drafted by the Edmonton Oilers when he left the WHA for the NHL, however, he again declined an opportunity to become involved with professional hockey and became a full-time brother of Jehovah's Witnesses, eventually serving as a branch committee member for the religion's Estonia headquarters.

== Transactions ==
- August 1973 – Edur signs as an underage free agent with Cleveland Crusaders
- May 28, 1974 – Drafted in the 3rd round, 54th overall by the Boston Bruins in the 1974 NHL amateur draft
- September 7, 1977 – Rights traded by the Boston Bruins to the Colorado Rockies for cash
- December 2, 1977 – Traded by the Colorado Rockies to the Pittsburgh Penguins for Dennis Owchar
- June 13, 1979 – Selected 12th by the Edmonton Oilers in the 1979 NHL Expansion Draft

== Career statistics ==
=== Regular season and playoffs ===
| | | | Regular season | | | | | Playoffs |
| Season | Team | League | GP | G | A | Pts | PIM | GP | G | A | Pts | PIM |
|---|---|---|---|---|---|---|---|---|---|---|---|---|
| 1971–72 | Markham Waxers | MJTHL | — | — | — | — | — | — | — | — | — | — |
| 1972–73 | Toronto Marlboros | OHA | 57 | 14 | 48 | 62 | 32 | 19 | 2 | 17 | 19 | 16 |
| 1972–73 | Markham Waxers | MJTHL | — | — | — | — | — | — | — | — | — | — |
| 1973–74 | Cleveland Crusaders | WHA | 76 | 7 | 31 | 38 | 26 | 5 | 1 | 2 | 3 | 0 |
| 1974–75 | Cleveland Crusaders | WHA | 61 | 3 | 20 | 23 | 28 | 5 | 2 | 0 | 2 | 0 |
| 1975–76 | Cleveland Crusaders | WHA | 80 | 7 | 28 | 35 | 62 | 3 | 0 | 2 | 2 | 0 |
| 1976–77 | Colorado Rockies | NHL | 80 | 7 | 25 | 32 | 39 | — | — | — | — | — |
| 1977–78 | Colorado Rockies | NHL | 20 | 5 | 7 | 12 | 10 | — | — | — | — | — |
| 1977–78 | Pittsburgh Penguins | NHL | 58 | 5 | 38 | 43 | 18 | — | — | — | — | — |
| WHA totals | | | 217 | 17 | 79 | 96 | 116 | 13 | 3 | 4 | 7 | 0 |
| NHL totals | | | 158 | 17 | 70 | 87 | 67 | — | — | — | — | — |
