= Mike Rogers (ice hockey) =

Canadian ice hockey player

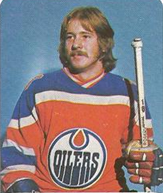
- Born: October 24, 1954 (age 71) Calgary, Alberta, Canada
- Height: 5 ft 9 in (175 cm)
- Weight: 170 lb (77 kg; 12 st 2 lb)
- Position: Centre
- Shot: Left
- Played for: Edmonton Oilers; New England / Hartford Whalers; New York Rangers
- National team: Canada
- NHL draft: 77th overall, 1974; Vancouver Canucks
- WHA draft: 48th overall, 1974; Edmonton Oilers
- Playing career: 1974–1986

Michael R. Rogers (born October 24, 1954) is a Canadian former professional ice hockey centre who played five seasons in the World Hockey Association, followed by seven seasons in the National Hockey League.

== Playing career ==
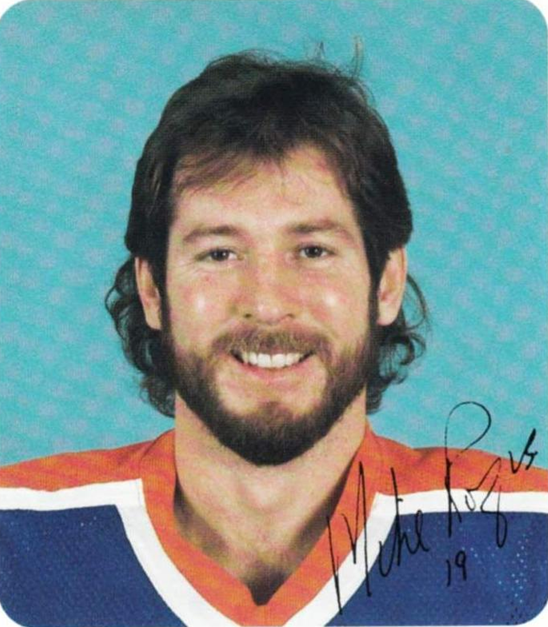
1985 card of Rogers in his second stint with the Oilers

Rogers was drafted by both the Vancouver Canucks (5th round, 77th overall) of the NHL and the Edmonton Oilers (4th round, 48th overall) of the WHA in 1974. He chose to start his professional career with the Oilers and was the Oilers' team-scoring champion in their third (1974–75) season.

Rogers was traded to the New England Whalers, with whom he entered the NHL when the leagues merged for the 1979–80 NHL season.

Rogers is one of four players to have scored 100 or more points in each of his first three NHL seasons, the others being Wayne Gretzky, Mario Lemieux and Peter Stastny.

The 1981–82 season saw him record 103 points on 38 goals and 65 assists to become the third Ranger in franchise history to record 100 points and the first in ten years (in the next four decades, only four other Rangers had done so).

After the 1985–86 season ended, Rogers wanted to try something different. He reflected in a 2020 interview:

Twelve years was … enough. Ann and I wanted to travel; living in Calgary you want to get away in the winter. The hockey travel grind had started to get to me a little bit, too. So a lot of factors entered into the decision. I sat down with my wife and said: ‘Had a good run.’ I’d never say a bad thing about those 12 years but they’d kind of took a toll. I could’ve signed another contract after my last year in the NHL. But my stats weren’t what they’d been. I knew I wasn’t playing as well as I had and I didn’t want to be one of those guys that just hung on for the sake of it.

He played one season with Ambrì-Piotta in the Swiss League, scoring 20 goals in 26 games before electing to return to Calgary to retire and spend time with his family. He later worked in the gas and oil industry.

Rogers was the colour commentator for the Calgary Flames on Calgary radio stations for 12 years before announcing his retirement on July 25, 2013.

== Legacy ==
In the 2009 book 100 Ranger Greats, the authors ranked Rogers at No. 88 all-time of the 901 New York Rangers who had played during the team’s first 82 seasons. In 2016, he was inducted into the Alberta Hockey Hall of Fame. In 2019, he was inducted into the Alberta Sports Hall of Fame.

== Career statistics ==
=== Regular season and playoffs ===
			Regular season					Playoffs
Season	Team	League	GP	G	A	Pts	PIM	GP	G	A	Pts	PIM
1971–72	Calgary Centennials	WCHL	66	27	30	57	19	13	2	4	6	2
1972–73	Calgary Centennials	WCHL	67	54	58	112	44	6	8	5	13	2
1973–74	Calgary Centennials	WCHL	66	67	73	140	32	14	13	16	29	6
1974–75	Edmonton Oilers	WHA	78	35	48	83	2	—	—	—	—	—
1975–76	Edmonton Oilers	WHA	44	12	15	27	10	—	—	—	—	—
1975–76	New England Whalers	WHA	36	18	14	32	10	17	5	8	13	2
1976–77	New England Whalers	WHA	78	25	57	82	10	5	1	1	2	2
1977–78	New England Whalers	WHA	80	28	43	71	46	14	5	6	11	8
1978–79	New England Whalers	WHA	80	27	45	72	31	10	2	6	8	2
1979–80	Hartford Whalers	NHL	80	44	61	105	10	3	0	3	3	0
1980–81	Hartford Whalers	NHL	80	40	65	105	32	—	—	—	—	—
1981–82	New York Rangers	NHL	80	38	65	103	43	9	1	6	7	2
1982–83	New York Rangers	NHL	71	29	47	76	28	1	0	0	0	0
1983–84	New York Rangers	NHL	78	23	38	61	45	1	0	0	0	0
1984–85	New York Rangers	NHL	78	26	38	64	24	3	0	4	4	4
1985–86	New Haven Nighthawks	AHL	20	9	15	24	28	—	—	—	—	—
1985–86	New York Rangers	NHL	9	1	3	4	2	—	—	—	—	—
1985–86	Nova Scotia Oilers	AHL	33	15	28	43	14	—	—	—	—	—
1985–86	Edmonton Oilers	NHL	8	1	0	1	0	—	—	—	—	—
1986–87	HC Ambrì–Piotta	NDA	26	21	14	35	26	—	—	—	—	—
WHA totals			396	145	222	367	109	46	13	21	34	14
NHL totals			484	202	317	519	184	17	1	13	14	6

=== International ===
Year	Team	Event	GP	G	A	Pts	PIM
1981	Canada	WC	6	0	1	1	4
Senior totals			6	0	1	1	4

== See also ==
- List of NHL players with 100-point seasons

Preceded by Rick Ley	Hartford Whalers captain 1980–81	Succeeded by Dave Keon
