= Bill Hunter (ice hockey) =

Canadian ice hockey executive, coach and player

Bill Hunter OC
- Born: May 5, 1920; Saskatoon, Saskatchewan, Canada
- Died: December 16, 2002 (aged 82); Edmonton, Alberta, Canada
- Occupations: Ice hockey manager, coach, investor
- Known for: Western Hockey League; World Hockey Association; Edmonton Oilers

William Dickenson Hunter, OC (May 5, 1920 – December 16, 2002) was a Canadian sports promoter and ice hockey player, coach, manager, and investor. Also known as "Wild Bill", Hunter co-founded the Western Hockey League (WHL), helped to launch the World Hockey Association (WHA), and worked to bring professional hockey to Edmonton and to his hometown of Saskatoon.

== Early life ==
Born in Saskatoon, Hunter founded his first competitive sports team when he was 18, the Saskatoon Dukes Football Club. Hunter attended Notre Dame College in Wilcox, Saskatchewan, where he managed the college's sports teams, including organizing a 78-game tour for the baseball team.

Following the outbreak of the Second World War, Hunter left school to join the Royal Air Force's International Squadron and served as a pilot based in England. After his time in the war, Hunter returned to Saskatoon, where he worked briefly for CFQC Radio before opening Hunter's Sporting Goods in North Battleford the following year.

== Career in hockey ==
=== Beginnings ===
Between 1945 and 1949 Hunter coached and managed hockey teams in North Battleford, Regina, Moose Jaw, Yorkton, and Saskatoon. It was during these years that Hunter was nicknamed "Wild Bill" following a dispute with a referee. Hunter did not like the nickname at first, but he ultimately embraced it. In 1950, Hunter founded the first curling bonspiel to be held on artificial ice, the Quaker Car Curling Bonspiel. He also managed and coached the Saskatoon Quakers hockey club until 1952.

From 1953 to 1956, he was the owner, manager, and coach of the Medicine Hat Tigers. In September 1956, Hunter claimed that, as owner, he could rightfully sell players. Alberta Amateur Hockey Association president Art Potter disagreed that any junior team owned its players or had the right to sell them to another team, and compared the idea to slavery. He warned that proper transfers must be completed to change teams and that players could be suspended if an agreement was not honoured to play for a team.

=== Founding the WHL ===
Hunter was the owner, manager, and coach of the junior Edmonton Oil Kings in the mid-1960s. In seven years from 1960 to 1966, the Oil Kings played for the Memorial Cup every year, but won just twice, in 1963 and 1966—the latter with Hunter at the helm—and finishing as runner-up to five teams. Hunter felt that the competitive structure of the game in Western Canada was putting the region at a disadvantage to stronger leagues in Ontario and Quebec; each western province still had its own junior league while Hunter believed the West needed a single top tier junior league to compete effectively with the larger associations out east. He found three partners who felt the same way: Scotty Munro of the Estevan Bruins, Del Wilson of the Regina Pats, and Jim Piggott of the Saskatoon Blades. The four men co-founded the Canadian Major Junior Hockey League, to begin play in 1966, and recruited the Calgary Buffaloes, Moose Jaw Canucks, and Weyburn Red Wings to join their teams in the upstart league. By its second season, the league added four more teams, including three based in Manitoba, and by 1971 the league spanned all four western provinces, from Manitoba to British Columbia.

The league had a rocky early relationship with the Canadian Amateur Hockey Association, the national governing body for amateur hockey, which considered the fledgling group to be an "outlaw league." The CMJHL, which was renamed the Western Canada Junior Hockey League in 1967 and the Western Canada Hockey League in 1968, was suspended from CAHA-sanctioned events, including, ironically, the Memorial Cup. However, the new league held together, and when CAHA reorganized Canadian junior hockey in 1971, it recognized the WCHL as one of the three top-tier junior leagues in the country. By 1972, the Memorial Cup's modern round-robin format was established, featuring a playoff between each top-tier league's champion. Since then, teams from the WHL have won the Memorial Cup 19 times, compared to 17 times for teams from the Ontario Hockey League and 14 times for teams from the Quebec Major Junior Hockey League. In 1978 the WCHL shortened its name to the Western Hockey League with the admission of American-based teams.

=== Founding the WHA and the Oilers ===
Following the establishment of the Western Junior League, Hunter set his sights on professional hockey, desiring to bring a National Hockey League (NHL) team to Edmonton. The NHL was expanding rapidly in the late 1960s and early 1970s, but the league rebuffed Hunter's proposal for an Edmonton team. Hunter offered to purchase and relocate the Pittsburgh Penguins, but this proposal was rejected. In 1971, Hunter was introduced to Gary Davidson and Dennis Murphy, two American investors who wanted to establish a professional league that could rival the NHL and provide smaller markets the opportunity to join the major leagues. Hunter became the key figure in securing further investment and franchise commitments—he later recalled that it quickly became apparent that Davidson and Murphy "didn't know a damn thing about hockey"—and before the end of 1971, the World Hockey Association was taking shape, set to begin play in 1972. Hunter was the league's founding president.

On November 1, 1971, the Alberta Oilers became one of the 12 charter WHA franchises, founded by Hunter and a partner, Edmonton surgeon and entrepreneur Chuck Allard. Hunter named the team after the junior Oil Kings. The team was to be based in Edmonton, fulfilling Hunter's promise to bring the city a professional franchise, and they were joined in the WHA by another small market western Canadian team, the Winnipeg Jets.

Hunter knew that the WHA needed to make a splash to gain credibility, and he came up with a scheme to sign NHL superstar Bobby Hull, then in a contract dispute with the Chicago Black Hawks, to hockey's first million-dollar contract. Ben Hatskin, who Hunter had recruited to help get the WHA off the ground and who founded the Jets, agreed to sign Hull to the contract; however, it took contributions from every team to meet the $1 million commitment, making Hull's contract the first instance in professional sports where every member of a league pitched in to sign a player to one team. Another major scheme was the staging of a second Summit Series between Canada and the Soviet Union, but this time having the Canadian team made up of WHA players. This second Summit Series took place in 1974, further increasing the credibility of the new league, although Canada lost the series.

Hunter and Allard's Oilers were assembled to prominently feature Albertan players, and its opening roster had eleven such players, including seven who had played for the junior Oil Kings. This included NHL recruit and leading scorer Jim Harrison, who on January 13, 1973, became the first major league player of the modern era to record 10 points in a match. The Alberta Oilers, who were renamed the Edmonton Oilers after their inaugural season, won the first game in WHA history, defeating the Ottawa Nationals 7–4. Hunter took over as the Oilers coach mid-season on three occasions, in 1973, 1975, and 1976. The team initially played in the dated, 4,500 seat Edmonton Gardens, but the team's financial success enabled Hunter and Allard to secure a new arena, the 16,500 seat Northlands Coliseum, which was completed in 1974. That same year, Hunter and Allard sold the franchise to Nelson Skalbania and Peter Pocklington; Pocklington would become sole owner in 1977. Ironically, the success of the Oilers ultimately led to the demise of Hunter's old junior team, as the Oil Kings relocated to Portland in 1976 and became the Winter Hawks.

The WHA struggled with financial stability, and franchises commonly relocated or folded altogether. By the 1978–79 season, the league was down to six teams. The league had long been in talks with the NHL about a merger, and in 1979 reached an agreement whereby the Oilers, Jets, Quebec Nordiques, and New England Whalers—thereafter renamed the Hartford Whalers—joined the NHL for the 1979–80 season. Although he was no longer the Oilers' owner, this fulfilled Hunter's dream of bringing the NHL to Edmonton. Moreover, in 1980, Skalbania led a group of investors who purchased the struggling Atlanta Flames and re-located the team to Calgary, bringing a second NHL team to Alberta. The Oilers became a dynasty in the ensuing decade; coached by Glen Sather and led on the ice by Wayne Gretzky, the team won the Stanley Cup five times between 1984 and 1990.

Today, the Edmonton Oilers' mascot, Hunter, is named in Bill Hunter's honour.

=== The "Saskatoon Blues" ===
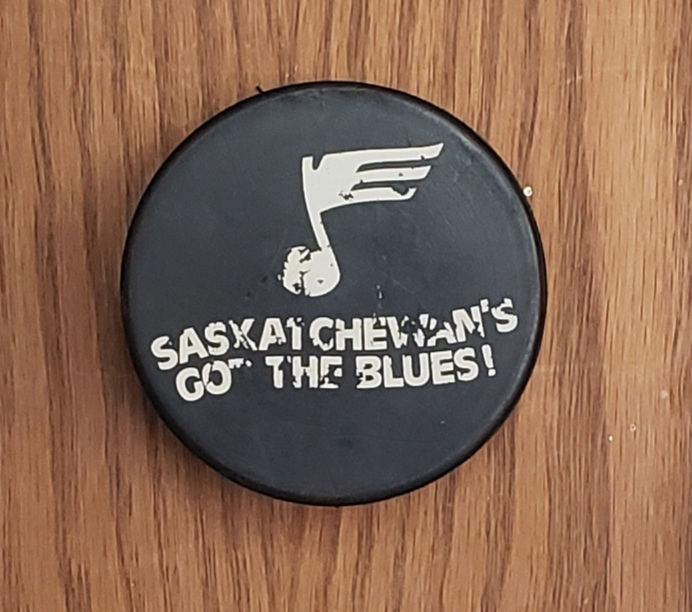
"Saskatchewan's Got The Blues!" promotional hockey puck, circa 1983

After divesting the Oilers, Hunter continued to aim to bring NHL hockey to new markets, and his last major project was an attempt to secure a franchise for Saskatoon. In 1983, Hunter led a group that purchased the struggling St. Louis Blues, with plans to relocate the team to Saskatchewan. The Blues appeared to be an ideal fit for such a move. The team's general manager, Emile Francis, was from Saskatchewan and had played for Hunter's Regina Capitals in the 1940s; the team featured Saskatchewan native and former Saskatoon Blades star Bernie Federko; and Hunter's son, Bart, even played goal for the Blues' minor-league affiliate, the Salt Lake Golden Eagles. Although Saskatoon's population was 160,000 at the time, which would have made it by far the smallest market in the NHL, Hunter's plan included securing financial backing from the province for a new 18,000-seat stadium to replace the aging Saskatoon Arena, along with thousands of season-ticket deposits. The team was prepared to play games in Regina until the new arena was ready. Moreover, Hunter negotiated a 20-year, $20 million sponsorship agreement with Molson's, and also worked with Air Canada to ensure new flight schedules between Saskatoon and NHL markets. Finally, Hunter even offered the head coaching position for the hoped-for Saskatoon team to former Boston Bruins coach Don Cherry, who agreed and joined Hunter in promoting the scheme.

When Hunter announced his purchase of the Blues from Ralston Purina, he exclaimed that the Saskatoon Blues would be the "finest franchise in the league" and the new arena "the most magnificent hockey building in North America," which the "wonderful people of Saskatchewan" deserved. However, most NHL owners opposed the move, with Toronto Maple Leafs owner Harold Ballard famously stating that visiting teams would have to travel by dog sled to Saskatoon. After the purchase agreement, Hunter still had to gain approval from the NHL's board of governors; he traveled to New York to pitch his vision, but the board voted against it by an overwhelming 15–3 margin. Although the size of the Saskatoon market was one reason for the rejection, so too was Hunter's tumultuous relationship with the NHL, stemming from his earlier days with the WHA. Hunter and his group were given the option of owning the team if they committed to keeping it in St. Louis, but Hunter was not interested. The league instead took over the Blues after Ralston Purina walked away, and eventually sold the team to Harry Ornest.

Although the Blues plan fell through, Saskatoon and the province followed through on building a new arena, dubbed Saskatchewan Place, which was completed in 1988. Although the arena was not built downtown, which Hunter had advocated for, the new arena helped to keep Hunter's dream alive. He made one final effort to bring the NHL to Saskatoon by putting together a bid for an expansion franchise in the early 1990s when the league was undergoing another round of rapid expansion. A Hunter-led group reportedly raised $50 million towards such a formal bid, and needing an additional $20 million, requested support from the Saskatchewan government. However, unlike in 1983, the province turned down that support, and Hunter's bid collapsed by 1992 when the NHL welcomed the Ottawa Senators and Tampa Bay Lightning as expansion teams.

== Later years and death ==
Following his unsuccessful attempts to bring the NHL to Saskatoon, Hunter organized softball tournaments in his hometown and invested in the San Diego Gulls hockey club. He remained active in the 1990s, helping to organize the Flexi-Coil curling cashspiel in his hometown before his health began to fail. He also played an ambassadorial role for the Edmonton Oilers. Upon Hunter's death in 2002, Oilers general manager Kevin Lowe noted that Hunter was important to keep the Oilers in Edmonton through the 1990s, a decade that saw two other former WHA franchises, the Winnipeg Jets and Quebec Nordiques, relocate to the United States, and which saw the Oilers undergo a tumultuous sale of its own that threatened relocation. Today, the Oilers are the only franchise that joined the NHL from the WHA that remains in its original location.

Hunter died of cancer at a hospital in Edmonton on December 16, 2002. He is interred at Holy Cross Cemetery. Hunter was married four times, and had seven children.

=== Honours ===
Hunter was made an Officer of the Order of Canada in 2000. He was inducted into the Canadian Sports Hall of Fame in 2001, and the Saskatchewan Sports Hall of Fame in 2002. After his death, the street leading to Saskatchewan Place was renamed Bill Hunter Avenue, while a minor-hockey arena in Edmonton also bears his name. Letter-writing campaigns in 1999 and 2000 attempted to get Hunter inducted into the Hockey Hall of Fame as a builder, but were unsuccessful. In 2010, he was elected as an inaugural inductee into the new World Hockey Association Hall of Fame in the builders category.

== Coaching record ==
Team	League	Year	Regular season						Postseason
Team	League	Year	G	W	L	T	Pts	Finish	Result
Edmonton Oilers	WHA	1972–73	26	14	11	1	(29)	5th Western	Missed playoffs
Edmonton Oilers	WHA	1974–75	19	6	12	1	(13)	5th Central	Missed playoffs
Edmonton Oilers	WHA	1975–76	33	9	21	3	(21)	4th Central	Lost in quarter-finals
Total			52	15	33	4			

== See also ==
- Ice hockey in Saskatchewan

Preceded by Position created	General manager of the Edmonton Oilers; 1972–76	Succeeded by Bep Guidolin
Preceded by Ray Kinasewich	Head coach of the Edmonton Oilers; 1972–73	Succeeded by Brian Shaw
Preceded by Brian Shaw	Head coach of the Edmonton Oilers; 1974–75	Succeeded by Clare Drake
Preceded by Clare Drake	Head coach of the Edmonton Oilers; 1975–76	Succeeded by Bep Guidolin
