= Paul Hurley =

American ice hockey player

- Born: July 12, 1946 (age 79) Melrose, Massachusetts, U.S.
- Height: 5 ft 11 in (180 cm)
- Weight: 185 lb (84 kg; 13 st 3 lb)
- Position: Defense
- Shot: Right
- Played for: Boston Bruins; New England Whalers; Edmonton Oilers; Calgary Cowboys
- National team: United States
- Playing career: 1969–1977

Paul Michael Hurley (born July 12, 1946) is an American professional ice hockey player who played 477 games in the World Hockey Association and 1 game in the National Hockey League between 1969 and 1977. He also played for the American national team at the 1968 Winter Olympics.

== High school ==
At Melrose High School, he was a 3-time Middlesex all-star, 2-time first-team all-scholastic, 2-time first-team high school all-American, and 2-time award winner as the outstanding defenseman for the New England schoolboy tournament. Paul was part of the school's undefeated 1962 team that won the Middlesex league, State, and New England schoolboy hockey champions. During 1963 at Melrose High School, Paul tied for the league scoring championship while playing defense. He was first-team Middlesex all-star, all-State, and New England tournament all-star (for 2 years straight), scoring 26 goals. Paul was inducted into the first Melrose High School Sports Hall of Fame.

Paul went to Deerfield Academy for 1-year postgraduate in 1964. He had 31 goals as a defenseman and was recognized as a first-team all-prep all-star.

== College ==
During his freshman year at Boston College, he led the freshman Boston College Eaglets with 22 goals in 18 games as a defenseman. During his junior year, the only year he played forward, Hurley scored 32 goals in 28 games and had 6 hat tricks. During his college career, he was an All-New England, All-East, and first-team All-American award recipient. During his senior year, Paul was recognized as the Boston College team MVP and was a first-team All-American defenseman. Paul was later inducted into the Boston College Sports Hall of Fame.

== International ==
While playing hockey at Boston College, Hurley was also a member of the United States men's national ice hockey team for two years, playing in the 1967 Ice Hockey World Championships and the 1968 Winter Olympics.

== National Hockey League ==
At the end of his senior year of college hockey, Hurley was signed as a free agent by the Boston Bruins. He played his first and only NHL professional hockey game on March 30, 1969. During that game, Hurley and Ron Murphy assisted on Phil Esposito's 48th goal of the season making the Bruins the first team to reach 300 goals in a season; they finished with 303 goals.

== World Hockey Association ==
Paul started his WHA career with the New England Whalers in 1972-1973 and was part of the team's AVCO Cup champions of the World Hockey Association. In 1975, while with the Whalers, Paul won the team's Unsung Hero Award.

He played for the New England Whalers, Edmonton Oilers and Calgary Cowboys.

== Career statistics ==
=== Regular season and playoffs ===
			Regular season					Playoffs
Season	Team	League	GP	G	A	Pts	PIM	GP	G	A	Pts	PIM
1962–63	Melrose High School	HS-MA	—	—	—	—	—	—	—	—	—	—
1963–64	Deerfield Academy	HS-MA	—	—	—	—	—	—	—	—	—	—
1964–65	Boston College	ECAC	18	22	13	35	—	—	—	—	—	—
1965–66	Boston College	ECAC	27	9	26	35	22	—	—	—	—	—
1966–67	Boston College	ECAC	28	32	23	55	12	—	—	—	—	—
1966–67	Concord Coachmen	Exhib	4	2	2	4	6	—	—	—	—	—
1966–67	United States National Team	Intl	21	9	7	16	6	—	—	—	—	—
1967–68	Concord Eastern Olympics	NEnHL	21	9	7	16	6	—	—	—	—	—
1968–69	Boston College	ECAC	26	14	28	42	22	—	—	—	—	—
1968–69	Oklahoma City Blazers	CHL	6	2	1	3	4	—	—	—	—	—
1968–69	Boston Bruins	NHL	1	0	0	0	0	—	—	—	—	—
1969–70	Oklahoma City Blazers	CHL	69	6	26	32	109	—	—	—	—	—
1970–71	Oklahoma City Blazers	CHL	43	5	12	17	47	5	0	1	1	8
1971–72	Boston Braves	AHL	74	7	28	35	65	9	0	4	4	8
1972–73	New England Whalers	WHA	78	3	15	18	58	15	0	7	7	14
1973–74	New England Whalers	WHA	52	3	11	14	21	—	—	—	—	—
1974–75	New England Whalers	WHA	75	3	26	29	36	6	0	1	1	4
1975–76	New England Whalers	WHA	46	0	14	14	20	—	—	—	—	—
1975–76	Edmonton Oilers	WHA	26	1	4	5	14	4	0	0	0	2
1976–77	Calgary Cowboys	WHA	34	0	6	6	32	—	—	—	—	—
WHA totals			311	10	76	86	181	25	0	8	8	18
NHL totals			1	0	1	1	0	—	—	—	—	—

=== International ===
Year	Team	Event	GP	G	A	Pts	PIM
1968	United States	OLY	7	3	3	6	0
Senior totals			7	3	3	6	0

== Awards and honors ==
Award	Year
All-ECAC Hockey First Team	1968–69
AHCA East All-American	1968–69

== See also ==
- List of players who played only one game in the NHL
