= Bill Evo =

American lawyer and ice hockey player/executive

- Born: February 21, 1954 (age 72) Royal Oak, Michigan, U.S.
- Height: 6 ft 2 in (188 cm)
- Weight: 190 lb (86 kg; 13 st 8 lb)
- Position: Center
- Shot: Left
- Played for: Michigan Stags/Baltimore Blades; Edmonton Oilers; Cleveland Crusaders
- NHL draft: 45th overall, 1974; Detroit Red Wings
- WHA draft: 22nd overall, 1974; Cincinnati Stingers
- Playing career: 1974–1979

Bill Evo (born February 21, 1954) is an American lawyer and a former professional ice hockey player and executive.

== Hockey career ==
Evo played major junior hockey in the Ontario Hockey League with the Peterborough Petes from 1971 to 1974. He was selected by the Detroit Red Wings of the National Hockey League (NHL) in the third round (45th overall) of the 1974 NHL amateur draft and was also drafted by the Cincinnati Stingers in the second round (22nd overall) of the 1974 WHA Secret Amateur Draft. Between 1974 and 1976, Evo played 97 games in the World Hockey Association, with the Michigan Stags/Baltimore Blades (the team moved mid-season), Edmonton Oilers and Cleveland Crusaders, scoring 14 goals and 18 assists for 32 points while earning 85 penalty minutes.

Evo was appointed the president of the Detroit Red Wings in September 1995, but resigned on July 23, 1996, after serving just 10 months at the Red Wing's helm.

== Legal career ==
Evo graduated from the University of Western Ontario, and earned his Juris Doctor degree from the University of Detroit Law School.

== Career statistics ==
=== Regular season and playoffs ===
| | | | Regular season | | | | | Playoffs |
| Season | Team | League | GP | G | A | Pts | PIM | GP | G | A | Pts | PIM |
|---|---|---|---|---|---|---|---|---|---|---|---|---|
| 1970–71 | Preston Raiders | COJHL | Statistics Unavailable |
| 1971–72 | Peterborough Petes | OHA | 54 | 9 | 8 | 17 | 83 | –– | –– | –– | –– | –– |
| 1972–73 | Peterborough Petes | OHA | 58 | 23 | 28 | 51 | 107 | –– | –– | –– | –– | –– |
| 1973–74 | Peterborough Petes | OHA | 65 | 24 | 28 | 52 | 158 | –– | –– | –– | –– | –– |
| 1974–75 | Syracuse Blazers | NAHL | 20 | 6 | 7 | 13 | 18 | –– | –– | –– | –– | –– |
| 1974–75 | Michigan Stags/Baltimore Blades | WHA | 49 | 13 | 9 | 22 | 32 | –– | –– | –– | –– | –– |
| 1975–76 | Philadelphia Firebirds | NAHL | 20 | 9 | 9 | 18 | 73 | –– | –– | –– | –– | –– |
| 1975–76 | Edmonton Oilers | WHA | 8 | 0 | 4 | 4 | 0 | –– | –– | –– | –– | –– |
| 1975–76 | Cleveland Crusaders | WHA | 40 | 1 | 5 | 6 | 32 | –– | –– | –– | –– | –– |
| 1977–78 | San Francisco Shamrocks | PHL | 40 | 26 | 18 | 44 | 61 | –– | –– | –– | –– | –– |
| 1978–79 | San Francisco Shamrocks | PHL | 13 | 5 | 4 | 9 | 24 | –– | –– | –– | –– | –– |
| WHA totals | | | 97 | 14 | 18 | 32 | 64 | — | — | — | — | — |
