= Clare Drake =

Canadian ice hockey coach (1928–2018)

- Born: Clare James Drake; October 9, 1928; Yorkton, Saskatchewan
- Died: May 13, 2018 (aged 89); Edmonton, Alberta
- Education: University of British Columbia (1951); University of Alberta (1954); University of Washington; University of Oregon (attended)
- Occupations: Former ice hockey player and coach (Edmonton Oilers (WHA), Alberta Golden Bears)
- Awards: CIAU Hockey Coach of the Year, 1975 & 1988, Hockey Hall of Fame

Clare James Drake CM AOE (October 9, 1928 – May 13, 2018) was a Canadian ice hockey coach. He was the most successful coach in Canadian Interuniversity Sport men's hockey history. In 28 years as the head coach of the University of Alberta men's ice hockey team, he coached the Alberta Golden Bears to six University Cup championships and 17 Canada West conference championships. The "dean of coaching," Clare developed the game for more than 40 years, coaching at the high school, university, Olympic, and WHA levels. The only university coach to win a national championship in both hockey and football in the same year (1967-1968), he was instrumental in the development of the National Coaching Certification and Coach Mentorship Programs. He was inducted into the Hockey Hall of Fame in 2017.

== Biography ==
Drake was born in Yorkton, Saskatchewan on October 9, 1928, the only child of Clarence and Grace Drake. Drake played junior ice hockey in Regina, Saskatchewan and Medicine Hat, Alberta. He then went to the University of British Columbia, where he played ice hockey for the UBC Thunderbirds, and graduated in 1951. In 1953, Drake entered the University of Alberta to earn his teaching credentials and play ice hockey; he graduated in 1954. Drake received a master's degree from the University of Washington. He also pursued, but did not finish, a doctorate in education at the University of Oregon.

After graduating from the University of Alberta, he played one season of professional ice hockey in Düsseldorf, West Germany, then returned to teach physical education at Strathcona High School in Edmonton. For the next three years, he was the head of the department and assisted the U of A head coach Don Smith. When Smith retired in 1958, Drake became the full-time coach of the Golden Bears.

Under Drake, the Alberta Golden Bears won 17 Western Conference championships and six Canadian championships. He also served as assistant football coach for most of the 1960s and filled in as head football coach for three of those years. In 1967-68, Drake became the only coach to win the intercollegiate hockey and football championships in the same year. He retired in 1989 from head coaching with the North American intercollegiate record for career wins and an overall record of 697 wins, 296 losses, and 37 ties, with a .695 win percentage. In 1990 the University's Varsity Arena was renamed the Clare Drake Arena in his honour.

In 1975–76, Drake took a break from the Golden Bears to serve as the head coach of the Edmonton Oilers of the WHA.

He also coached Team Canada at the 1980 Winter Olympics in Lake Placid and led Team Canada International to a gold medal at the Spengler Cup in Davos, Switzerland in 1983. He was an assistant coach for the Winnipeg Jets, consulted for several NHL teams, and assisted the Canadian national women's team. In 2017, Drake was inducted into the Hockey Hall of Fame in the builder category. He died in Edmonton on May 13, 2018.

== Awards and honours ==
- Named the CIAU Hockey Coach of the Year in 1975 and 1988
- Co-coach of the 1980 Canadian Men's Olympic team
- Gold medal as Head coach of Team Canada at Spengler Cup Tournament
- Hockey Alberta Centennial Award
- Order of Hockey in Canada
- University of Alberta Sports Wall of Fame (1987)
- Alberta Order of Excellence (2008)
- Canada's Sports Hall of Fame (1989)
- Geoff Gowan Award for career achievement from the Coaching Association of Canada (2006)
- Order of Canada (2013)
- Inducted into Hockey Hall of Fame in 2017 as a builder

== Coaching record ==
Team	Year	Regular season						Postseason
Team	Year	G	W	L	T	Pts	Finish	Result
Edmonton Oilers	1975–76	48	18	28	2	38	4th in WHA Canadian	Fired

== Legacy ==
- Clare Drake Arena - University of Alberta
- Clare Drake Award - Canadian Interuniversity Sport Rookie of the Year award

Preceded by Brian Shaw	Head coach of the Edmonton Oilers; 1975–76	Succeeded by Bill Hunter
