= Stu MacGregor =

Canadian ice hockey executive

- Citizenship: Canadian
- Occupation: Director of Scouting
- Years active: 2007–2015
- Employer(s): Edmonton Oilers; Kamloops Blazers 2015-2018; Dallas Stars 2018-present
- Organization: National Hockey League

Stu MacGregor is a Canadian ice hockey executive. Since 2007 he has held the position of Director of Amateur Scouting for the Edmonton Oilers of the National Hockey League (NHL). MacGregor was fired in 2015 from the Edmonton Oilers. Later that October joined the Kamloops Blazers management team.

MacGregor was the general manager of the Kamloops Blazers of the Western Hockey League from 1995 to 1998, before taking a scouting position with the Dallas Stars of the NHL. He joined the Edmonton Oilers in 2000, and in 2008 he replaced Kevin Prendergast as the Oilers' Director of Amateur Scouting.
