= Oilogosphere =

Blogs for the Edmonton Oilers

The Oilogosphere is the name collectively applied to blogs that cover the Edmonton Oilers ice hockey team. They are widely considered to be among the best and most popular hockey blogs on the internet, with The Globe and Mail sportswriter James Mirtle estimating in late 2007 that "five or six" of the best hockey blogs were members of the Oilogosphere. Many of its flagship blogs started in 2005, near the end of the 2004–05 NHL lockout (though Edmonton journalist Colby Cosh was making Oilers-related posts on his blog before that time). Observers have credited the Oilogosphere with providing greater depth and drawing the reader in more effectively than the mainstream media. Reviews of the Oilogosphere in the print media have generally been positive, with one reviewer praising it for its "smart, opinionated, ferocious and utterly entertaining commentary and analysis". The Oilogosphere averages 10,000 hits per day not counting people who visit the official Oilers site or read the sports stories online.

== Current Members ==
Though the Oilogosphere has no clear borders, some of its more prominent current blogs include:

- Lowetide is written by Allan Mitchell, a local father of two and radio ad salesman. He often posts about Oilers history and prospects and is, according to the Edmonton Journal, "seen by the younger bloggers as the calm and kind father figure of the Oilogosphere". Vue Weekly has said that his blog is for "the Oiler fan who watches the game with a beer in hand and a copy of Ken Dryden’s The Game to read during intermission."
- OilersNation is a group blog, with contributors including local journalists Robin Brownlee and Jason Gregor and amateur Jonathan Willis. In the past, contributors to the blog have included, Lowetide, Jonathan Willis, Jeanshorts, Matt Henderson. The blog has broken many things over the last few years and have created a lifestyle brand in and around Edmonton with some of the highest selling clothing in the Oilogosphere.
- Copper and Blue is a group blog, owned by the sports conglomerate, SB Nation.
- OilOnWhyte is a group blog, owned by the sports conglomerate, SB Nation.
- Beer League Heroes is a group blog founded by Kelly Holtz, a father of two based in Taipei, Taiwan and a language acquisition engineer (aka English teacher). In the past, contributors to the blog have included Holtz himself, Zach Laing, Rob Cooke, Walter Foddis, G Money, Lindsay Ryall, Johnny Potts, etc. The website was established in 2010 and is described as a blog of the armchair GM, by an armchair GM, for the armchair GM. Beer League Heroes is a blog that focuses on everything Oilers related. Trade rumors, pre and post game reports, prospects, and everything else in between.

=== Original Six (that isn't actually six) ===
Edmonton Journal writer David Staples identified 7 blogs that started it off, that he jokingly referred to as the Original Six.

- Lowetide (still current; see above)
- MC79, named after Mudcrutch, focuses on in-depth statistical analysis and is written by Toronto lawyer Tyler Dellow, who also came up with the name Oilogosphere. Dellow is now an Assistant General Manager for the Carolina Hurricanes.
- Irreverent Oiler Fans. Was one of the early stats focussed discussion and was home to much of the innovation on the Oilogosphere, the birth place of such revolutionary stats as Corsi plus-minus and ZoneStart. It was related to Ferrari’s useful Time On Ice site, which totalled up various stats on NHL players. Along with Gabe Desjardins’ Behind the Net,Time on Ice is a vital site for fans interested in advanced stats.
- The Battle of Alberta focuses on the rivalry between the Oilers and the Calgary Flames, and includes contributors from both teams' fan bases. It was the original "Battle" blog, which went on to inspire others such as the Battle of California. Founding members of the Battle of Alberta were a mysterious writer who used the pseudonym(?) 'sacamano' for the Oilers and Matt Fenwick for the Flames. The site was known for a mixture of statistics and humerous commentary and was often the site of massive comment threads during games. Of note, Fenwick is who the hockey statistic Fenwick is named for.
- Black Dog Hates Skunks. A memoir and hocky blog written by Pat McLean. It was the most 'literary' of the early blogs, and often had charming and heartfelt posts linking Pat's love of the Oilers with his own life and those around him.
- Covered in Oil was written by David Berry, Chris Boutet, and Mike Winters, all alumni of the Gateway, the University of Alberta student newspaper, and focused on irreverent commentary and humour. In October 2008, Berry announced his departure, which he attributed to an incident in which he was ejected from the Oilers' press box (where he was working for a media organization) for liveblogging a game between the Oilers and the Colorado Avalanche, and with a general disillusionment with the Oilers organization and professional sports. Winters followed suit November 8, saying that blogging entailed "pretending to care about the team 30% more than I actually do". As of January 2009, no new posts had been added since November 17, 2008, and was being called "as good as gone" in Edmonton media. On August 20, 2009, Winters formally announced the blog's retirement.
- Hot Oil was written by three female Oilers fans—Vancouverite Erin Loxam, Torontonian Alana Pentney, and Edmontonian Heather Smith—and focuses on the players' physical attractiveness. Writing under the slogan "Giggling is our biznaz and biznaz is good", the site hosted an annual "Hot off" in which readers vote on the most attractive Oiler (champions to date include Ethan Moreau in 2006, Ales Hemsky in 2007, and Lubomir Visnovsky in 2008).

Other Blogs of Note

- Jeanshorts and Baggedmilk was a self professed "Place for Gentlemen," with contributors that use blue language to express their opinions regarding the Edmonton Oilers. Jeanshorts and baggedmilk cover a wide array of topics outside the Oilers, including "music you should know about" and celebrity news.
