= Rod Phillips (broadcaster) =

Canadian sportscaster (born 1941)

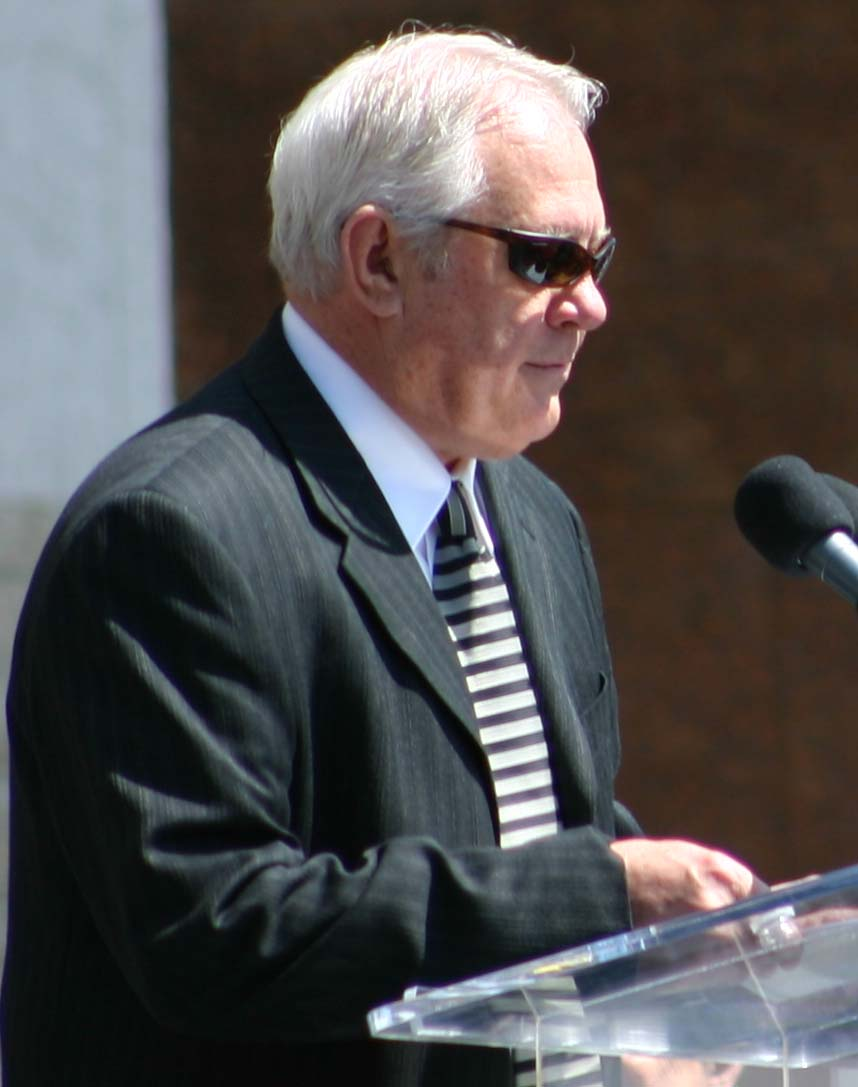
- Born: September 9, 1941 (age 84); Edmonton, Alberta, Canada
- Occupation: Radio Broadcaster
- Spouse: Debby
- Children: 2
- Relatives: Chris Phillips (nephew)

Rod Phillips (born September 9, 1941) is a retired Canadian radio broadcaster for 630 CHED in Edmonton, Alberta. Phillips is best known as the play-by-play man of the World Hockey Association and National Hockey League's Edmonton Oilers from 1973 to 2011, succeeding longtime Edmonton Eskimos broadcaster Bryan Hall despite having no experience in the field. He is most famous for his loud, long scream of "scooooooooooores!" which is considered a classic by Oilers fans. Many fans attending games brought their radios to Northlands Coliseum to listen to his broadcasts, and many people watching games on television turned down the sound to listen to his coverage. In 2003, Phillips received the Foster Hewitt Memorial Award and was inducted into the Hockey Hall of Fame.

Rod Phillips was born in Edmonton, Alberta, in 1941 and grew up in Calmar, Alberta. Before being a hockey broadcaster, Phillips hosted Edmonton's first-ever late-night television show in 1967.

Rod Phillips is the uncle of retired Ottawa Senators defenseman Chris Phillips.

Phillips announced his retirement on May 28, 2010. Although retired, he still broadcast 10 more games of the 2010–2011 season, referred to as a "farewell tour" and dubbed "Rod's Classics." These ten games included the Oilers' greatest rivals: Calgary Flames, Detroit Red Wings, Phoenix Coyotes (née Winnipeg Jets), Montreal Canadiens, New York Islanders, Dallas Stars, Boston Bruins, Colorado Avalanche, Philadelphia Flyers, and Los Angeles Kings, in that order.

Rod called his 3,552nd and final game on March 29, 2011, officially marking his retirement. During a pre-game ceremony before the game, the Edmonton Oilers honored the Hockey Hall of Famer with a banner marked not with a sweater number but, rather, the number 3,542, which references the number of games he called for the Oilers.

== On-air durability ==
Well known for his on-air durability, Phillips once even tried to call a game while suffering a bleeding nose so bad that it blurred his vision and was known to call games even while sick with severe colds. Phillips had only missed nine periods of Oilers hockey during his entire career - two full games missed due to illness and three first periods missed after participating in on-ice ceremonies - until November 2008, when he missed a 7 game road trip only after being banned from flying by his doctors due to an ear infection. At the time, Phillips said that felt that he was 'letting people down.' Bob Stauffer, the regular color commentator, filled in for him on during the road trip, an admirable performance which led many to speculate Stauffer would be Phillips' eventual replacement. Upon Phillips' retirement, Jack Michaels was named as his replacement.
