= List of WHA players =

This is a list of World Hockey Association (WHA) players who played at least one game from the 1972–73 WHA season to the 1978–79 WHA season.

== By player name ==
=== A ===
- Bruce Abbey
- Dennis Abgrall
- Christer Abrahamsson
- Thommy Abrahamsson
- Jim Adair
- Ray Adduono
- Rick Adduono
- Kevin Ahearn
- Chris Ahrens
- Claire Alexander
- Jeff Allan
- Steve Alley
- Mike Amodeo
- Ron Anderson
- Ron Anderson
- Steve Andrascik
- Paul Andrea
- Randy Andreachuk
- Lou Angotti
- Mike Antonovich
- John Arbour
- Michel Archambault
- Yves Archambault
- Danny Arndt
- Bob Ash
- Ron Ashton
- Freeman "Duke" Asmundson
- Steve Atkinson
- Serge Aubry

=== B ===
- Ralph Backstrom
- Garnet "Ace" Bailey
- Ken Baird
- Blake Ball
- Terry Ball
- Dave Balon
- Bryon Baltimore
- Bob "Butch" Barber
- Bob Barlow
- Doug Barrie
- Jamie Bateman
- Andy Bathgate
- Paul Baxter
- Frank Beaton
- Norm Beaudin
- Serge Beaudoin
- Alain Beaule
- John Bennett
- Wendell Bennett
- Jim Benzelock
- Yves Bergeron
- Bill Berglund
- Thommie Bergman
- Jean Bernier
- Serge Bernier
- Doug Berry
- Larry Bignell
- Gilles Bilodeau
- Yvon Bilodeau
- Les Binkley
- Milt Black
- Don Blackburn
- Bill Blackwood
- Jacques "Jim" Blain
- Bob Blanchet
- Bernie Blanchette
- Ken Block
- Frank Blum
- Gregg Boddy
- Mike Boland
- Dan Bolduc
- Kerry Bond
- Chris Bordeleau
- Paulin Bordeleau
- Don Borgeson
- Henry Boucha
- Bruce Boudreau
- Michel Boudreau
- André Boudrias
- Brian Bowles
- Kirk Bowman
- Bob Boyd
- Jim Boyd
- Wally Boyer
- Dean Boylan
- Curt Brackenbury
- Brian Bradley
- Duane Bray
- Gary Bredin
- Carl Brewer
- Doug Brindley
- Ken Broderick
- Richard Brodeur
- Gary "Bones" Bromley
- Andy Brown
- Arnie Brown
- Bob Brown
- Ken Brown
- Jeff Brubaker
- Ron Buchanan
- Brad Buetow
- Randy Burchell
- Don Burgess
- Ron Busniuk
- Bill Butters
- Brian Bye
- Mike Byers

=== C ===
- Brian Cadle
- Terry Caffery
- Larry Cahan
- Brett Callighen
- Bryan Campbell
- Colin Campbell
- Scott Campbell
- Rychard Campeau
- Jim Cardiff
- Steve Cardwell
- Wayne Carleton
- Brian Carlin
- Jack Carlson
- Jeff Carlson
- Steve Carlson
- Steve Carlyle
- Alain Caron
- Jacques Caron
- Greg Carroll
- Jean-Yves Cartier
- Tony Cassolato
- Frantisek Cernik
- Bob Charlebois
- Claude Chartre
- Gerry Cheevers
- Mike Chernoff
- Jack Chipchase
- Ron Chipperfield
- Keith Christiansen
- Kim Clackson
- Gordie Clark
- Jim Clarke
- Ray Clearwater
- Ron Climie
- Real Cloutier
- Brian Coates
- Howie Colborne
- Jim Cole
- Brian Conacher
- Gary Connelly
- Wayne Connelly
- Cam Connor
- Mike Conroy
- Charles Constantin
- Gaye Cooley
- Michel Cormier
- Jim Corsi
- Alain Cote
- Roger Cote
- Tom Cottringer
- Norm Cournoyer
- Richard Coutu
- Bart Crashley
- Glenn Critch
- Jim Cross
- Keith Crowder
- Paul Crowley
- Steve Cuddie
- John Cunniff
- Gary Cunningham
- Rick Cunningham
- Mike Curran
- Paul Curtis

=== D ===
- Bob D'Alvise
- Joe Daley
- John Danby
- Richard David
- Blair Davidson
- Bill Davis
- Kelly Davis
- Butch Deadmarsh
- Barry Dean
- Dave Debol
- Michel DeGuise
- Ray Delorenzi
- Ron Delorme
- Ab DeMarco Jr.
- Brian Derksen
- Andre Deschamps
- Norm Descoteaux
- Ken Desjardine
- Gerry Desjardins
- Kevin Devine
- Bob Dillabough
- Wayne Dillon
- Michel Dion
- Bob Dobek
- Gary Donaldson
- John Donnelly
- Pat Donnelly
- Pete Donnelly
- Jim Dorey
- Dave Dornseif
- Jordy Douglas
- Kent Douglas
- Gary Doyle
- Peter Driscoll
- Dave Dryden
- Norm Dubé
- Michel Dubois
- Rick Dudley
- Guy Dufour
- Richard Dumas
- Dave Dunn
- Rich Dupras
- Steve Durbano
- Vitezslav Duris
- Ed Dyck
- Vladimir Dzurilla

=== E ===
- Tommy Earl
- Tom Edur
- Grant Erickson
- Roland Eriksson
- Chris Evans
- Bill Evo

=== F ===
- Bob Falkenberg
- Craig Falkman
- Richard Farda
- Tony Featherstone
- Mike Fedorko
- Norm Ferguson
- Milan Figala
- John Fisher
- Bob Fitchner
- Reg Fleming
- Bill Flett
- Peter Folco
- Rick Foley
- Len Fontaine
- Val Fonteyne
- Dave Forbes
- Mike Ford
- Connie Forey
- Dave Fortier
- Florent Fortier
- Joe Fortunato
- Nick Fotiu
- Rick Fraser
- John French
- Robbie Ftorek

=== G ===
- Gord Gallant
- Gary Gambucci
- George Gardner
- Jean-Claude Garneau
- John Garrett
- Mike Gartner
- Ron Garwasiuk
- Marty Gateman
- Andre Gaudette
- Jean Gauthier
- Sam Gellard
- Jean-Guy Gendron
- Dan Geoffrion
- Wes George
- Brian Gibbons
- Gerard Gibbons
- Jack Gibson
- John Gibson
- Ed Gilbert
- Jeannot Gilbert
- Andre Gill
- Bill Gilligan
- Russ Gillow
- Tom Gilmore
- Dave Gilmour
- Gaston Gingras
- Rejean Giroux
- Dave Given
- Brian Glenwright
- Allan Globensky
- Bill Goldsworthy
- Bill Goldthorpe
- Frank Golembrosky
- Don Gordon
- Dave Gorman
- Rich Gosselin
- Michel Goulet
- Ron Grahame
- Bill Gratton
- Gilles Gratton
- Jean-Guy Gratton
- John Gravel
- John Gray
- Ted Green
- Bruce Greig
- Richard Grenier
- Gary Gresdal
- Wayne Gretzky
- Don Grierson
- Chris Grigg
- Danny Gruen
- Bob Guindon
- Pierre Guite
- Bud Gulka
- Bengt-Ake Gustafsson

=== H ===
- Derek Haas
- Larry Hale
- Matti Hagman
- Del Hall
- Murray Hall
- Al Hamilton
- Ted Hampson
- Alf Handrahan
- Merv Haney
- Alan Hangsleben
- Craig Hanmer
- John Hanna
- Ron Hansis
- David Hanson
- Nick Harbaruk
- Jocelyn Hardy
- Jim Hargreaves
- Ted Hargreaves
- Derek Harker
- George "Duke" Harris
- Hugh Harris
- Jim Harrison
- Rich Hart
- Craig Hartsburg
- Michel Harvey
- Ed Hatoum
- Murray Heatley
- Paul Heaver
- Clay Hebenton
- Anders Hedberg
- Howie Heggedal
- Bill Heindl Jr.
- Earl Heiskala
- Paul Henderson
- Pierre Henry
- Don Herriman
- Bill Hicke
- Pat Hickey
- Glenn Hicks
- Larry Hillman
- Wayne Hillman
- André Hinse
- Jamie Hislop
- Mike Hobin
- Ted Hodgson
- Ed Hoekstra
- Dale Hoganson
- Paul Hoganson
- Terry Holbrook
- Bill Holden
- Jerry Holland
- Paul Holmgren
- Leif "Honken" Holmquist
- Vaclav Honc
- Ralph Hopiavuori
- Larry Hornung
- Bill Horton
- Rejean Houle
- Gordie Howe
- Mark Howe
- Marty Howe
- Harry Howell
- Fran Huck
- Bill Hughes
- Brent Hughes
- Frank Hughes
- John Hughes
- Bobby Hull
- Steve Hull
- Ed Humphreys
- Dave Hunter
- Paul Hurley
- Ron Huston
- Dave Hutchison
- Mike Hyndman
- Dave Hynes

=== I ===
- Lee Inglis
- Dave Inkpen
- Gary Inness
- Glen Irwin
- Larry Israelson

=== J ===
- Jeff Jacques
- Mike Jakubo
- Gary Jaquith
- Gary Jarrett
- Pierre Jarry
- Rick Jodzio
- Bob Johnson
- Danny Johnson
- Jim Johnson
- Larry Johnston
- Ed Johnstone
- Bob Jones
- Jim Jones
- Jimmy Jones
- Ric Jordan
- Eddie Joyal
- Joe Junkin
- Dan Justin

=== K ===
- Hannu Kamppuri
- Gordon Kannegiesser
- Miroslav Kapoun
- Al Karlander
- Dennis Kassian
- Mike Keeler
- Jamie Kennedy
- Murray Kennett
- Murray Keogan
- Dave Keon
- Doug Kerslake
- Veli-Pekka Ketola
- Kerry Ketter
- John Kiely
- Steve King
- Gavin Kirk
- Jan Klabouch
- Bill Klatt
- Darrel Knibbs
- Jaroslav Kocer
- Keith Kokkola
- Jindrich Kokrment
- Jiri Kolar
- George Konik
- Milan Kraft
- Skip Krake
- Reg Krezanski
- Jarda Krupicka
- Dave Kryskow
- Gary Kurt
- George Kuzmicz
- Josef Kveton

=== L ===
- Gord Labossiere
- Dan Labraaten
- François Lacombe
- Andre Lacroix
- Pete Laframboise
- Jean-Guy Lagace
- Pierre Lagacé
- Floyd Lahache
- Bill Laing
- Rick Lalonde
- Bruce Landon
- Dave Langevin
- Rod Langway
- Camille LaPierre
- Norm LaPointe
- Garry Lariviere
- Claude Larose
- Paul Larose
- Ray LaRose
- Curt Larsson
- Don Larway
- Mike Laughton
- Brian Lavender
- Danny Lawson
- Jean-Paul LeBlanc
- Rene LeClerc
- Bob Leduc
- Rich Leduc
- Barry Legge
- Randy Legge
- Bob Leiter
- Jacques Lemelin
- Richard Lemieux
- Gerry Leroux
- Bill Lesuk
- Jean-Louis Levasseur
- Rick Ley
- Bob Liddington
- Leonard Lilyholm
- Mats Lindh
- Doug Lindskog
- Willy Lindstrom
- Ken Linseman
- Mike Liut
- Owen Lloyd
- Jacques Locas
- Ken Lockett
- Dan Lodboa
- Mark Lomenda
- Barry Long
- Ted Long
- Bernie Lukowich
- Morris Lukowich
- Chuck Luksa
- Larry Lund
- Len Lunde
- Jaroslav Lycka
- George Lyle

=== M ===
- Blair MacDonald
- Bruce MacGregor
- Gary MacGregor
- Al MacKenzie
- Paul MacKinnon
- Bob MacMillan
- Bernie MacNeil
- Ralph MacSweyn
- Dean Magee
- Darryl Maggs
- Frank Mahovlich
- Peter Mara
- Gilles Marotte
- Peter Marrin
- Jim Marsh
- Peter Marsh
- Tom Martin
- Markus Mattsson
- Larry Mavety
- Bryan Maxwell
- Jim Mayer
- John Mazur
- Bob McAneeley
- Ted McAneeley
- Dunc McCallum
- Jack McCartan
- Ted McCaskill
- Jim McCrimmon
- Don McCulloch
- Ab McDonald
- Brian McDonald
- Al McDonough
- Peter McDuffe
- Dick McGlynn
- Ray McKay
- Brian McKenzie
- John McKenzie
- Al McLeod
- Don McLeod
- Jimmy McLeod
- Mike McMahon Jr.
- Bob McManama
- Jim McMasters
- Dale McMullin
- Mike McNamara
- Peter McNamee
- Jaroslav Mec
- Gerry Meehan
- Denis Meloche
- Chris Meloff
- Barry Melrose
- Paul Menard
- Vic Mercredi
- Barry Merrell
- Mark Messier
- Gerry Methe
- Joe Micheletti
- John Migneault
- Thomas Milani
- Perry Miller
- Warren Miller
- Eddie Mio
- John Miszuk
- Lyle Moffat
- Lauri Mononen
- Brian Morenz
- Angie Moretto
- Ron Morgan
- Wayne Morrin
- Bill Morris
- Peter Morris
- Rick Morris
- George Morrison
- Kevin Morrison
- Dave Morrow
- Cleland "Keke" Mortson
- Wayne Mosdell
- Darwin Mott
- Morris Mott
- Bob Mowat
- Wayne Muloin
- Murray Myers

=== N ===
- Mark Napier
- Robbie Neale
- Vaclav Nedomansky
- Greg Neeld
- Jim Neilson
- Eric Nesterenko
- Bob Nevin
- Rick Newell
- Cam Newton
- Jim Niekamp
- Kent Nilsson
- Ulf Nilsson
- Lou Nistico
- Joe Noris
- Jack Norris
- Craig Norwich
- Milos Novak
- Kevin Nugent

=== O ===
- Tim O'Connell
- Fred O'Donnell
- Don O'Donoghue
- Paul O'Neil
- Danny O'Shea
- Kevin O'Shea
- Gerry Odrowski
- Wally Olds
- Billy Orr
- François Ouimet
- Ted Ouimet
- Ludimir Ozlizlo

=== P ===
- Pierre Paiement
- Rosaire Paiement
- Marcel Paille
- Dick Paradise
- Bernie Parent
- Michel Parizeau
- Jim Park
- Ed "Rusty" Patenaude
- Craig Patrick
- Glenn Patrick
- Denis Patry
- Dennis Patterson
- Jean Payette
- Pavel Pazourek
- Gene Peacosh
- Mel Pearson
- André Peloffy
- Mike Pelyk
- Lubomir Penicka
- Dwayne Pentland
- Ross Perkins
- Bob Perreault
- Brian Perry
- George Pesut
- Garry Peters
- Jean-Luc Phaneuf
- Gerry Pinder
- Ed Pizunski
- Jacques Plante
- Michel Plante
- Larry Pleau
- Ron Plumb
- Ivan Podesva
- Nick Polano
- Jan Popiel
- Poul Popiel
- Lynn Powis
- Kelly Pratt
- Bill Prentice
- Rich Preston
- Pat Price
- Kevin Primeau
- Jim Pritchard
- Dick Proceviat
- Rich Pumple

=== R ===
- Robert "Cap" Raeder
- Rob Ramage
- Pekka Rautakallio
- Bill Reed
- Craig Reichmuth
- Seppo Repo
- Brad Rhiness
- Steve Richardson
- Pavel Richter
- Pat Riggin
- Heikki "Hexi" Riihiranta
- Ron Riley
- Wayne Rivers
- Garth Rizzuto
- Phil Roberto
- Doug Roberts
- Gordie Roberts
- Joe Robertson
- Frank Rochon
- John Rogers
- Mike Rogers
- Jerry Rollins
- Lorne Rombough
- Bob Roselle
- Randy Rota
- Michel Rouleau
- Dunc Rousseau
- Pierre Roy
- Kent Ruhnke
- Duane Rupp
- Terry "Roscoe" Ruskowski
- Bob Russell
- Wayne Rutledge
- Terry Ryan
- Al Rycroft
- Blaine Rydman

=== S ===
- Larry Sacharuk
- Cal Sandbeck
- Frank Sanders
- Derek Sanderson
- Nick Sanza
- Craig Sarner
- Dick Sarrazin
- Glen Sather
- Ted Scharf
- John Schella
- William "Buzz" Schneider
- Jim Schraefel
- Brit Selby
- Brad Selwood
- Dave Semenko
- Rick Sentes
- Ron Serafini
- Tom Serviss
- Sean Shanahan
- Jim Shaw
- Bobby Sheehan
- Tim Sheehy
- John Sheridan
- Jim Sherrit
- Glen Shirton
- John Shmyr
- Paul Shmyr
- Byron Shutt
- Bob Sicinski
- Risto Siltanen
- Tom Simpson
- Gary Sittler
- Lars-Erik Sjoberg
- Peter Slater
- Rudolf Slavik
- Mike Sleep
- Louis Sleigher
- Dale Smedsmo
- Al Smith
- Brian Smith
- Gary Smith
- Guy Smith
- Rick Smith
- Ross Smith
- Ron Snell
- Dennis Sobchuk
- Gene Sobchuk
- Fred Speck
- Bill Speer
- Irv Spencer
- Dan Spring
- Frank Spring
- Claude St. Sauveur
- Jack Stanfield
- Pat Stapleton
- Bill Steele
- Ken Stephanson
- Bob Stephenson
- Mike Stevens
- John Stewart,
- John Stewart
- Paul Stewart
- Blaine Stoughton
- Danny Sullivan
- Peter Sullivan
- Bill Sutherland
- Steve Sutherland
- Garry Swain
- Cal Swenson
- Dave Syvret
- Joe Szura

=== T ===
- Rudy Tajcnar
- Juhani Tamminen
- Don Tannahill
- Milos Tarant
- Marc Tardif
- Dave Tataryn
- Ted Taylor
- Greg Tebbutt
- Paul Terbenche
- Jean Tetreault
- Reg Thomas
- Alex Tidey
- Gord Titcomb
- John Tonelli
- Craig Topolnisky
- J.C. Tremblay
- Tom Trevelyan
- Willie Trognitz
- Jerry Trooien
- Guy Trottier
- Jim Troy
- Gordon Tumilson
- Jim Turkiewicz
- Frank Turnbull

=== U ===
- Norm Ullman

=== V ===
- Rick Vaive
- John Van Horlick
- Gary Veneruzzo
- Pierre Viau
- Mario Viens
- Vladislav Vlcek
- Doug Volmar
- Frantisek Vyborny

=== W ===
- Ernie Wakely
- Russ Walker
- Bob Wall
- Brian Walsh
- Ed Walsh
- Dave Walter
- Ron Walters
- Mike Walton
- Rob Walton
- Ron Ward
- Jim Warner
- Steve Warr
- Bryan Watson
- Jim Watson
- Tom Webster
- Stan Weir
- Wally Weir
- Steve West
- Pat Westrum
- Carl Wetzel
- Bob Whidden
- Alton White
- Bob Whitlock
- Juha Widing
- Ian Wilkie
- Barry Wilkins
- Tom Williams
- Warren "Butch" Williams
- Gary Williamson
- Hall Willis
- Bob Winograd
- Jim Wiste
- Wayne Wood
- Chris Worthy
- Bob Woytowich
- Randy Wyrozub

=== Y ===
- Dale Yakiwchuk
- Bill Young
- Howie "Cowboy" Young

=== Z ===
- Rod Zaine
- Joe Zanussi
- Lynn Zimmerman
- Jerry Zrymiak
- Wayne Zuk
- Mike Zuke

== By team ==
- List of Birmingham Bulls (WHA) players
- List of Calgary Cowboys (WHA) players
- List of Chicago Cougars players
- List of Cincinnati Stingers players
- List of Cleveland Crusaders players
- List of Denver Spurs/Ottawa Civics players
- List of Edmonton Oilers (WHA) players
- List of Houston Aeros players
- List of Indianapolis Racers players
- List of Los Angeles Sharks players
- List of Michigan Stags/Baltimore Blades players
- List of Minnesota Fighting Saints players
- List of New England Whalers players
- List of New York Golden Blades/New Jersey Knights players
- List of New York Raiders players
- List of Ottawa Nationals players
- List of Philadelphia Blazers players
- List of Phoenix Roadrunners (WHA) players
- List of Quebec Nordiques (WHA) players
- List of San Diego Mariners (WHA) players
- List of Toronto Toros players
- List of Vancouver Blazers players
- List of Winnipeg Jets (WHA) players

== By specific group ==
- World Hockey Association Hall of Fame
- WHA Playoff MVP
- WHA amateur draft
- WHA general player draft
- WHA Playoff MVP
- WHA amateur draft

== See also ==
- List of WHA head coaches
- List of NHL players
