= List of Los Angeles Sharks players =

This is a list of players who played at least one game for the Los Angeles Sharks of the World Hockey Association from 1972–73 to 1973–74.

== B ==
- Kirk Bowman
- Mike Byers

== C ==
- Bart Crashley

== D ==
- Brian Derksen

== G ==
George Gardner, Ron Garwasiuk, Russ Gillow, Tom Gilmore, Don Gordon,

== H ==
Howie Heggedal, Earl Heiskala, Ted Hodgson, Paul Hoganson, Bill Horton, Mike Hyndman,

== J ==
Mike Jakubo, Bob Jones,

== K ==
Jarda Krupicka,

== L ==
Jean-Paul LeBlanc,

== M ==
Bernie MacNeil, Ralph MacSweyn, Larry Mavety, Ted McCaskill, Brian McDonald, Jimmy McLeod,

== N ==
Jim Niekamp,

== O ==
Gerry Odrowski,

== P ==
Bob Perreault,

== S ==
Tom Serviss, Peter Slater, Fred Speck, Steve Sutherland, Joe Szura,

== T ==
Marc Tardif, Reg Thomas,

== V ==
Gary Veneruzzo,

== W ==
Ron Walters, Ron Ward, Jim Watson, Alton White, Bob Whitlock, Ian Wilkie, Hal Willis,

== Y ==
Bill Young,

== Z ==
Jerry Zrymiak,
