= 1973–74 Los Angeles Sharks season =

World Hockey Association team season

1973–74 Los Angeles Sharks
- Division: 6th Western
- 1973–74 record: 25–53–0
- Home record: 17–22–0
- Road record: 8–31–0
- Goals for: 239
- Goals against: 339

Team information
- General manager: Dennis Murphy
- Coach: Terry Slater (5–14–0); Ted McCaskill (20–39–0)
- Captain: Ted McCaskill (until mid-November)
- Alternate captains: Gerry Odrowski; Jim Watson
- Arena: L.A. Sports Arena
- Average attendance: 5,338 (36.7%)

Team leaders
- Goals: Marc Tardif (40)
- Assists: J.P. LeBlanc (46)
- Points: Marc Tardif (70)
- Penalty minutes: Steve Sutherland (182)
- Wins: Ian Wilkie (11)
- Goals against average: Ian Wilkie (3.92)

The 1973–74 Los Angeles Sharks season was the Los Angeles Sharks' second and final season in Los Angeles in the World Hockey Association. The club finished last in the WHA Western Division and missed the playoffs. They moved to Detroit, MI after the season and became the Michigan Stags.

== Offseason ==
The Sharks lured promising left wing Marc Tardif from the Montreal Canadiens to jump to the Sharks.

== Regular season ==
The Sharks attempted to build on their first season by signing their first bonafide NHL star in the Montreal Canadiens' Marc Tardif. And while the offense featured five 20 goal scorers (Tardif with 40, Gary Veneruzzo with 39, Brian McDonald with 22, and J.P. LeBlanc and Steve Sutherland with 20 apiece), they still ranked last in the league in scoring. The defense was equally porous, falling from 3rd in the league to 11th (next to last). Last year's #1 goalie George Gardner played only 2 games due to injuries, and Russ Gillow suffered from injuries and the "sophomore jinx" as his GAA went from 2.91 in 1972–73 to 3.98 in 1973–74. The other goalies that were brought in didn't fare much better, with Ian Wilkie sporting an unimpressive 3.91 GAA, Jim McLeod at 4.27, and Paul Hoganson even worse with a 4.68 GAA. The special teams, which were solid the season before, also fell on hard times as the power play ranked 9th and the penalty killing went from 3rd in the league to last. The Sharks ended up with the worst record in the league, and endured losing streaks of 9 and 6 games. The only noteworthy item was that they became the first team ever to have no ties (the WHA 10-minute overtime rule helped, but WHA teams still averaged 4 ties per season).

=== Final standings ===
Western Division
	GP	W	L	T	GF	GA	PIM	Pts
Houston Aeros	78	48	25	5	318	219	1038	101
Minnesota Fighting Saints	78	44	32	2	332	275	1243	90
Edmonton Oilers	78	38	37	3	268	269	1273	79
Winnipeg Jets	78	34	39	5	264	296	673	73
Vancouver Blazers	78	27	50	1	278	345	1047	55
Los Angeles Sharks	78	25	53	0	239	339	1086	50

== Schedule and results ==
1973–74 regular season
October

Game	Result	Date	Score	Opponent	Record
1	L	October 13, 1973	3–4	Houston Aeros (1973–74)	0–1–0
2	L	October 16, 1973	0–3	Toronto Toros (1973–74)	0–2–0
3	L	October 18, 1973	2–7	Chicago Cougars (1973–74)	0–3–0
4	W	October 21, 1973	4–1	@ Vancouver Blazers (1973–74)	1–3–0
5	W	October 23, 1973	4–3	Cleveland Crusaders (1973–74)	2–3–0
6	L	October 24, 1973	2–6	@ Houston Aeros (1973–74)	2–4–0
7	L	October 26, 1973	1–3	@ Cleveland Crusaders (1973–74)	2–5–0
8	L	October 27, 1973	1–3	@ New England Whalers (1973–74)	2–6–0
9	W	October 28, 1973	2–0	@ New York Golden Blades (1973–74)	3–6–0
10	L	October 30, 1973	4–6	Quebec Nordiques (1973–74)	3–7–0

November

Game	Result	Date	Score	Opponent	Record
11	L	November 2, 1973	1–5	Minnesota Fighting Saints (1973–74)	3–8–0
12	L	November 3, 1973	4–6	@ Houston Aeros (1973–74)	3–9–0
13	L	November 4, 1973	3–6	@ Toronto Toros (1973–74)	3–10–0
14	L	November 6, 1973	4–5 OT	@ Chicago Cougars (1973–74)	3–11–0
15	W	November 7, 1973	3–1	@ Vancouver Blazers (1973–74)	4–11–0
16	W	November 9, 1973	4–2	Toronto Toros (1973–74)	5–11–0
17	L	November 11, 1973	2–6	@ Winnipeg Jets (1973–74)	5–12–0
18	L	November 13, 1973	0–4	@ Edmonton Oilers (1973–74)	5–13–0
19	L	November 16, 1973	3–4 OT	Cleveland Crusaders (1973–74)	5–14–0
20	L	November 18, 1973	2–5	New England Whalers (1973–74)	5–15–0
21	W	November 20, 1973	6–2	Minnesota Fighting Saints (1973–74)	6–15–0
22	L	November 22, 1973	3–4	Chicago Cougars (1973–74)	6–16–0
23	W	November 23, 1973	2–0	Edmonton Oilers (1973–74)	7–16–0
24	W	November 27, 1973	5–4 OT	Winnipeg Jets (1973–74)	8–16–0
25	W	November 30, 1973	5–2	@ Winnipeg Jets (1973–74)	9–16–0

December

Game	Result	Date	Score	Opponent	Record
26	W	December 1, 1973	5–4 OT	@ Chicago Cougars (1973–74)	10–16–0
27	L	December 4, 1973	2–9	@ Minnesota Fighting Saints (1973–74)	10–17–0
28	W	December 6, 1973	4–3	Houston Aeros (1973–74)	11–17–0
29	W	December 12, 1973	7–2	@ Edmonton Oilers (1973–74)	12–17–0
30	L	December 14, 1973	0–1	@ Winnipeg Jets (1973–74)	12–18–0
31	L	December 15, 1973	4–6	@ Vancouver Blazers (1973–74)	12–19–0
32	W	December 16, 1973	5–3	Vancouver Blazers (1973–74)	13–19–0
33	L	December 18, 1973	2–5	Vancouver Blazers (1973–74)	13–20–0
34	L	December 21, 1973	3–4	@ Minnesota Fighting Saints (1973–74)	13–21–0
35	L	December 22, 1973	3–8	@ Houston Aeros (1973–74)	13–22–0
36	L	December 27, 1973	1–5	New England Whalers (1973–74)	13–23–0
37	L	December 30, 1973	4–6	Houston Aeros (1973–74)	13–24–0

January

Game	Result	Date	Score	Opponent	Record
38	W	January 4, 1974	4–3	Edmonton Oilers (1973–74)	14–24–0
39	W	January 8, 1974	4–1	Winnipeg Jets (1973–74)	15–24–0
40	L	January 10, 1974	1–7	@ Quebec Nordiques (1973–74)	15–25–0
41	L	January 12, 1974	4–5	@ Cleveland Crusaders (1973–74)	15–26–0
42	L	January 13, 1974	6–9	@ New England Whalers (1973–74)	15–27–0
43	W	January 15, 1974	6–4	Quebec Nordiques (1973–74)	16–27–0
44	W	January 18, 1974	4–1	Toronto Toros (1973–74)	17–27–0
45	W	January 19, 1974	3–2	@ Houston Aeros (1973–74)	18–27–0
46	L	January 20, 1974	0–3	Vancouver Blazers (1973–74)	18–28–0
47	L	January 22, 1974	1–3	@ Houston Aeros (1973–74)	18–29–0
48	W	January 25, 1974	2–0	Quebec Nordiques (1973–74)	19–29–0
49	W	January 27, 1974	6–3	@ Jersey Knights (1973–74)	20–29–0
50	L	January 29, 1974	0–5	@ Quebec Nordiques (1973–74)	20–30–0
51	L	January 31, 1974	4–5 OT	@ Toronto Toros (1973–74)	20–31–0

February

Game	Result	Date	Score	Opponent	Record
52	L	February 1, 1974	0–4	@ Winnipeg Jets (1973–74)	20–32–0
53	L	February 3, 1974	2–5	@ Edmonton Oilers (1973–74)	20–33–0
54	L	February 7, 1974	4–7	Jersey Knights (1973–74)	20–34–0
55	L	February 10, 1974	2–4	Chicago Cougars (1973–74)	20–35–0
56	L	February 12, 1974	2–4	Winnipeg Jets (1973–74)	20–36–0
57	L	February 15, 1974	4–6	Houston Aeros (1973–74)	20–37–0
58	L	February 17, 1974	0–4	Vancouver Blazers (1973–74)	20–38–0
59	W	February 20, 1974	4–2	New England Whalers (1973–74)	21–38–0
60	L	February 24, 1974	3–5	Edmonton Oilers (1973–74)	21–39–0
61	L	February 26, 1974	2–4	@ Chicago Cougars (1973–74)	21–40–0
62	L	February 27, 1974	4–5	@ Minnesota Fighting Saints (1973–74)	21–41–0

March

Game	Result	Date	Score	Opponent	Record
63	L	March 2, 1974	7–8	@ Jersey Knights (1973–74)	21–42–0
64	L	March 3, 1974	3–5	@ Minnesota Fighting Saints (1973–74)	21–43–0
65	L	March 5, 1974	3–6	Cleveland Crusaders (1973–74)	21–44–0
66	W	March 8, 1974	4–1	Edmonton Oilers (1973–74)	22–44–0
67	W	March 10, 1974	6–5	Minnesota Fighting Saints (1973–74)	23–44–0
68	L	March 12, 1974	1–8	@ Edmonton Oilers (1973–74)	23–45–0
69	L	March 13, 1974	2–5	@ Vancouver Blazers (1973–74)	23–46–0
70	L	March 14, 1974	0–6	Houston Aeros (1973–74)	23–47–0
71	L	March 20, 1974	5–8	Jersey Knights (1973–74)	23–48–0
72	L	March 22, 1974	2–5	Minnesota Fighting Saints (1973–74)	23–49–0
73	W	March 24, 1974	6–3	Winnipeg Jets (1973–74)	24–49–0
74	L	March 27, 1974	1–7	@ New England Whalers (1973–74)	24–50–0
75	L	March 28, 1974	3–9	@ Quebec Nordiques (1973–74)	24–51–0
76	L	March 30, 1974	4–5 OT	@ Cleveland Crusaders (1973–74)	24–52–0
77	L	March 31, 1974	4–5	@ Toronto Toros (1973–74)	24–53–0

April

Game	Result	Date	Score	Opponent	Record
78	W	April 4, 1974	6–4	Jersey Knights (1973–74)	25–53–0

Legend: Win (2 points) Loss (0 points) Tie (1 point)

== Player statistics ==
Regular season
Scoring

Player	Pos	GP	G	A	Pts	PIM	+/-	PPG	SHG	GWG
Marc Tardif	LW	75	40	30	70	47	0	10	0	3
Gary Veneruzzo	W	78	39	29	68	68	0	5	0	4
J.P. LeBlanc	C	78	20	46	66	58	0	7	0	0
Brian McDonald	C	56	22	30	52	54	0	4	0	3
Gerry Odrowski	D	77	4	32	36	48	0	2	0	0
Reg Thomas	LW	72	14	21	35	22	0	1	0	3
Ron Ward	C	40	14	19	33	16	0	3	0	2
Steve Sutherland	LW	72	20	12	32	182	0	4	0	4
Bart Crashley	D	78	4	26	30	16	0	2	0	1
Ron Walters	C	71	14	14	28	28	0	1	0	3
Alton White	RW	48	8	13	21	13	0	0	0	0
Tom Serviss	C	74	6	15	21	37	0	0	2	1
Jim Niekamp	D	76	2	19	21	95	0	0	0	0
Ron Garwasiuk	LW	51	6	13	19	100	0	0	1	0
Don Gordon	RW	29	8	6	14	24	0	1	0	0
Bob Whitlock	C	14	4	10	14	4	0	1	0	0
Ted Hodgson	RW	23	3	9	12	22	0	2	0	0
Jerry Zrymiak	D	27	2	8	10	8	0	0	0	1
Bill Horton	D	60	0	9	9	46	0	0	0	0
Earl Heiskala	LW	24	2	6	8	45	0	0	0	0
Fred Speck	C	18	2	5	7	4	0	0	0	0
Jim Watson	D	48	0	6	6	28	0	0	0	0
Ted McCaskill	C	18	2	2	4	63	0	0	1	0
Bill Young	LW	16	1	3	4	4	0	0	0	0
Hal Willis	D	18	1	2	3	24	0	0	0	0
Ralph MacSweyn	D	13	0	3	3	6	0	0	0	0
Peter Slater	RW	19	1	1	2	2	0	0	0	0
Kirk Bowman	LW	10	0	2	2	0	0	0	0	0
Mike Hyndman	RW	8	0	1	1	0	0	0	0	0
Brian Derksen	D	1	0	0	0	2	0	0	0	0
George Gardner	G	2	0	0	0	0	0	0	0	0
Russ Gillow	G	18	0	0	0	2	0	0	0	0
Paul Hoganson	G	27	0	0	0	0	0	0	0	0
Jim McLeod	G	17	0	0	0	0	0	0	0	0
Ian Wilkie	G	23	0	0	0	2	0	0	0	0

Goaltending

Player	MIN	GP	W	L	T	GA	GAA	SO
Ian Wilkie	1257	23	11	9	0	82	3.91	1
Paul Hoganson	1308	27	6	16	0	102	4.68	0
Russ Gillow	1041	18	4	13	0	69	3.98	1
Jim McLeod	969	17	4	13	0	69	4.27	1
George Gardner	120	2	0	2	0	13	6.50	0
Team:	4695	78	25	53	0	335	4.28	3

Note: Pos = Position; GP = Games played; G = Goals; A = Assists; Pts = Points; +/- = plus/minus; PIM = Penalty minutes; PPG = Power-play goals; SHG = Short-handed goals; GWG = Game-winning goals
MIN = Minutes played; W = Wins; L = Losses; T = Ties; GA = Goals-against; GAA = Goals-against average; SO = Shutouts;

== Transactions ==
The Sharks' decline in the standings and quality of play was poorly timed in that the NHL's Los Angeles Kings across town were beginning a resurgence that would see them make the playoffs for the next decade. The novelty of the WHA wore off, and attendance dropped measurably. After the 1973–74 season, the Sharks moved to Detroit, MI and became the Michigan Stags. After 43 games in Detroit MI, the Stags moved to Baltimore and finished out the season as the Baltimore Blades.

Tom Gilmore traded to Edmonton Oilers for Ron Walters, October, 1973.

George Gardner & Ralph MacSweyn traded to Vancouver Blazers for Ron Ward, October, 1973.

Ian Wilkie purchased from Edmonton Oilers, November, 1973.

Mike Hyndman sold to Phoenix Roadrunners(WHL), December, 1973.

Peter Slater sold to Denver Spurs (WHL), December, 1973.

Russ Gillow & Earl Heiskala traded to Jersey Knights for Jim McLeod, January, 1974.

Don Gordon & Jim Watson traded to Chicago Cougars for Bobby Whitlock, February, 1974.

Ron Ward traded to Cleveland Crusaders for Ted Hodgson & Bill Young, February, 1974.

Ian Wilkie traded to Edmonton Oilers for Wayne Zuk, March, 1974.

== Draft picks ==
Los Angeles's draft picks at the 1973 WHA Amateur Draft.

Round	#	Player	Nationality	College/Junior/Club team (League)
1	8	Reg Thomas (C)	Canada	London Knights (OHA)
2	22	Paul Sheard (LW)	Canada	Ottawa 67's (OHA)
3	34	Doug Gibson (C)	Canada	Peterborough Petes (OHA)
4	47	Jim Cowell (F)	Canada	Ottawa 67's (OHA)
4	50	Peter Crosbie (G)	Canada	London Knights (OHA)
5	60	Dennis Abgrall (RW)	Canada	Saskatoon Blades (WCHL)
6	73	Stu Davison (C)	Canada	Cornwall Royals (QMJHL)
7	86	David Lee (LW)	Canada	Ottawa 67's (OHA)
8	98	Sam Clegg (G)	Canada	Medicine Hat Tigers (WCHL)
9	109	Randy Aimoe (D)	Canada	Medicine Hat Tigers (WCHL)

== See also ==
- 1973–74 WHA season
