= List of Cleveland Crusaders players =

This is a list of players who played at least one game for the Cleveland Crusaders of the World Hockey Association from 1972–73 to 1975–76.

== A ==
Ray Adduono, Ron Anderson, Paul Andrea

== B ==
Blake Ball, Terry Ball, Paul Baxter, Brian Bowles, Doug Brindley, Ron Buchanan, Brad Buetow

== C ==
Steve Cardwell, Jacques Caron, Gerry Cheevers, Ray Clearwater, Wayne Connelly, Mike Conroy, Norm Cournoyer

== D ==
Bob Dillabough

== E ==
Tom Edur, Grant Erickson, Bill Evo

== G ==
Danny Gruen

== H ==
John Hanna, Jocelyn Hardy, Jim Harrison, Bill Heindl, Larry Hillman, Wayne Hillman, Ted Hodgson, Terry Holbrook, Ralph Hopiavuori, Bill Horton

== J ==
Gary Jarrett, Bob Johnson

== K ==
Skip Krake

== L ==
Rich LeDuc, Barry Legge, Randy Legge

== M ==
Gary MacGregor, Bryan Maxwell, Al McDonough, Ray McKay, Jim McMasters, Lyle Moffat, Ron Morgan, Wayne Muloin

== N ==
Robbie Neale, Cam Newton

== P ==
Gerry Pinder, Rich Pumple

== R ==
Al Rycroft

== S ==
Glen Shirton, Paul Shmyr, John Stewart (born 1950), John Stewart (born 1954)

== T ==
Juhani Tamminen

== W ==
Russ Walker, Ron Ward, Bob Whidden, Jim Wiste

== Y ==
Bill Young
