= Serviss =

Serviss is a surname. Notable people with the surname include:

- Garrett Serviss (1881–1907), American high jumper
- Garrett P. Serviss (1851–1929), American astronomer and writer
- Tom Serviss (born 1948), Canadian ice hockey player
