= J-bomb =

J-bomb may refer to:

- Jean-Paul LeBlanc (ice hockey) (born 1946), retired professional ice hockey player
- weapon in the video game Blast Corps
