= Peter Slater =

Peter Slater may refer to:

- Peter Slater (ice hockey) (born 1948), Canadian ice hockey player
- Peter Slater (ornithologist) (1932–2020), Australian ornithologist, wildlife artist, and photographer
- Peter Slater (sculptor) (1809–1860), Scottish sculptor and portrait artist
