= Bob Perreault =

Canadian ice hockey player

- Born: March 28, 1932; Trois-Rivières, Quebec, Canada
- Died: September 10, 1980 (aged 49); Saint-Etienne-des-Grès, Quebec, Canada
- Height: 5 ft 8 in (173 cm)
- Weight: 170 lb (77 kg; 12 st 2 lb)
- Position: Goaltender
- Caught: Left
- Played for: Detroit Red Wings; Boston Bruins; Montreal Canadiens; Los Angeles Sharks
- Playing career: 1948–1974

Joseph Robert Michel Perreault (January 28, 1931 – September 10, 1980) was a Canadian professional ice hockey player who played 31 games in the National Hockey League and 1 game in the World Hockey Association between 1955 and 1973. He played with the Detroit Red Wings, Boston Bruins, Montreal Canadiens, and Los Angeles Sharks. He is the cousin of Gilbert Perreault.

== Career statistics ==
=== Regular season and playoffs ===
			Regular season									Playoffs
Season	Team	League	GP	W	L	T	MIN	GA	SO	GAA	SV%	GP	W	L	MIN	GA	SO	GAA	SV%
1948–49	Trois-Rivieres Reds	QJHL-B	46	26	16	4	2830	142	6	3.01	—	8	4	4	490	29	0	3.55	—
1949–50	Trois-Rivieres Reds	QJHL-B	36	22	12	2	2190	91	4	2.49	—	9	4	5	549	30	0	3.28	—
1950–51	Trois-Rivieres Reds	QJHL-B	35	25	10	0	2108	96	2	2.73	—	8	4	4	517	30	0	3.48	—
1951–52	Providence Reds	AHL	22	8	13	0	1250	95	0	4.56	—	1	0	1	60	7	0	7.00	—
1952–53	Providence Reds	AHL	6	1	5	0	360	26	0	4.33	—	—	—	—	—	—	—	—	—
1952–53	Sherbrooke Saints	QSHL	29	15	11	3	1780	84	1	2.83	—	—	—	—	—	—	—	—	—
1953–54	Montreal Royals	QSHL	58	34	20	4	3528	160	4	2.72	—	9	5	4	544	22	2	2.43	—
1954–55	Shawinigan Falls Cataracts	QSHL	58	37	18	3	3490	129	10	2.22	—	12	9	3	720	31	1	2.58	—
1955–56	Montreal Canadiens	NHL	6	3	3	0	360	12	1	2.00	.931	—	—	—	—	—	—	—	—
1955–56	Shawinigan Falls Cataracts	QSHL	57	40	14	3	3450	146	4	2.54	—	11	6	5	665	24	2	2.17	—
1956–57	Shawinigan Falls Cataracts	QSHL	41	12	22	7	2556	132	0	3.10	—	—	—	—	—	—	—	—	—
1956–57	Rochester Americans	AHL	24	15	7	1	1440	66	3	2.75	—	10	5	5	637	27	2	2.54	—
1957–58	Hershey Bears	AHL	47	26	17	4	2820	128	3	2.72	—	11	8	3	660	31	0	2.82	—
1958–59	Detroit Red Wings	NHL	3	2	1	0	180	9	1	3.00	.957	—	—	—	—	—	—	—	—
1958–59	Hershey Bears	AHL	52	—	—	—	3000	134	6	2.68	—	13	8	5	780	35	1	2.69	—
1959–60	Hershey Bears	AHL	66	26	33	7	3960	205	5	3.11	—	—	—	—	—	—	—	—	—
1960–61	Hershey Bears	AHL	41	22	16	3	2460	116	3	2.83	—	8	4	4	504	24	0	2.86	—
1961–62	Hershey Bears	AHL	66	36	25	5	3960	189	4	2.86	—	7	3	4	451	17	0	2.26	—
1962–63	Boston Bruins	NHL	22	3	12	7	1286	82	1	3.83	.893	—	—	—	—	—	—	—	—
1962–63	Rochester Americans	AHL	10	3	4	2	600	27	0	2.70	—	2	0	2	120	11	0	5.50	—
1963–64	San Francisco Seals	WHL	70	32	35	3	4230	257	0	3.65	—	11	8	3	677	41	0	3.63	—
1964–65	San Francisco Seals	WHL	69	30	37	2	4164	268	0	3.86	—	—	—	—	—	—	—	—	—
1965–66	Rochester Americans	AHL	41	26	10	1	2361	121	3	3.07	—	9	7	2	532	17	2	1.92	—
1966–67	Rochester Americans	AHL	54	30	17	5	3149	158	4	3.01	—	13	6	7	785	38	2	2.90	—
1967–68	Rochester Americans	AHL	57	31	15	7	3101	149	6	2.88	—	9	5	3	515	28	1	3.26	—
1968–69	Rochester Americans	AHL	19	5	10	1	913	63	0	4.14	—	—	—	—	—	—	—	—	—
1969–70	Des Moines Oak Leafs	IHL	27	—	—	—	1467	66	1	2.70	—	—	—	—	—	—	—	—	—
1970–71	Des Moines Oak Leafs	IHL	19	—	—	—	1062	57	1	3.22	—	8	—	—	478	21	0	2.63	—
1971–72	Des Moines Oak Leafs	IHL	51	—	—	—	3139	176	1	3.36	—	3	0	3	180	15	0	5.00	—
1972–73	Los Angeles Sharks	WHA	1	1	0	0	60	2	0	2.00	.882	—	—	—	—	—	—	—	—
1973–74	Greensboro Generals	SHL	16	—	—	—	930	62	0	4.01	—	—	—	—	—	—	—	—	—
WHA totals			1	1	0	0	60	2	0	2.00	.882	—	—	—	—	—	—	—	—
NHL totals			31	8	16	7	1826	103	3	3.38	.903	—	—	—	—	—	—	—	—
