= Bob Jones (ice hockey) =

Canadian ice hockey player (1945–2026)

- Born: November 27, 1945 Espanola, Ontario, Canada
- Died: January 24, 2026 (aged 80) Greater Sudbury, Ontario, Canada
- Height: 6 ft 1 in (185 cm)
- Weight: 185 lb (84 kg; 13 st 3 lb)
- Position: Left wing
- Shot: Left
- Played for: New York Rangers; Los Angeles Sharks; New York Raiders; New York Golden Blades/Jersey Knights; Michigan Stags/Baltimore Blades; Indianapolis Racers
- Playing career: 1962–1976

Robert Charles Jones (November 27, 1945 – January 24, 2026) was a Canadian professional ice hockey player. He played two games in the National Hockey League (NHL) and 161 games in the World Hockey Association (WHA) between 1969 and 1976. In the NHL he played with the New York Rangers and in the WHA with the Los Angeles Sharks, New York Raiders, New York Golden Blades/Jersey Knights, Michigan Stags/Baltimore Blades, and Indianapolis Racers. Jones' younger brother, Jim Jones, also played in the NHL.

Jones died on January 24, 2026, at the age of 80.

== Career statistics ==
=== Regular season and playoffs ===
			Regular season					Playoffs
Season	Team	League	GP	G	A	Pts	PIM	GP	G	A	Pts	PIM
1962–63	Guelph Royals	OHA	49	5	7	12	13	—	—	—	—	—
1963–64	Kitchener Rangers	OHA	56	6	12	18	50	—	—	—	—	—
1964–65	Kitchener Rangers	OHA	56	39	53	92	59	—	—	—	—	—
1965–66	Kitchener Rangers	OHA	48	24	25	49	57	19	11	14	25	18
1966–67	Omaha Knights	CHL	19	0	2	2	10	—	—	—	—	—
1966–67	Vancouver Canucks	WHL	47	8	9	17	24	8	3	2	5	8
1967–68	Buffalo Bisons	AHL	72	21	32	53	38	5	2	4	6	4
1968–69	New York Rangers	NHL	2	0	0	0	0	—	—	—	—	—
1968–69	Buffalo Bisons	AHL	70	19	37	56	92	6	2	4	6	4
1969–70	Buffalo Bisons	AHL	71	25	37	62	40	14	5	10	15	14
1970–71	Seattle Totems	WHL	72	17	43	60	61	—	—	—	—	—
1971–72	Salt Lake Golden Eagles	WHL	27	9	7	16	10	—	—	—	—	—
1971–72	Portland Buckaroos	WHL	18	4	4	8	9	11	2	3	5	16
1972–73	Los Angeles Sharks	WHA	20	2	7	9	8	—	—	—	—	—
1972–73	New York Raiders	WHA	56	11	12	23	24	—	—	—	—	—
1973–74	New York Golden Blades/Jersey Knights	WHA	78	17	28	45	20	—	—	—	—	—
1974–75	Michigan Stags/Baltimore Blades	WHA	5	0	1	1	8	—	—	—	—	—
1974–75	Syracuse Blazers	NAHL	67	38	76	114	52	—	—	—	—	—
1975–76	Indianapolis Racers	WHA	2	0	0	0	0	—	—	—	—	—
1975–76	Mohawk Valley Comets	NAHL	69	39	70	109	38	4	3	1	4	7
WHA totals			161	30	48	78	60	—	—	—	—	—
NHL totals			2	0	0	0	0	—	—	—	—	—
