= George Gardner (ice hockey) =

Canadian ice hockey player

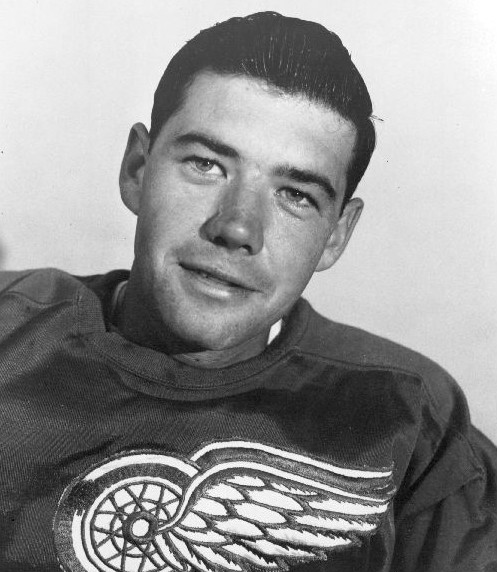
- Born: October 8, 1942; Lachine, Quebec, Canada
- Died: November 6, 2006 (aged 64); Coconut Creek, Florida, U.S.
- Height: 5 ft 10 in (178 cm)
- Weight: 165 lb (75 kg; 11 st 11 lb)
- Position: Goaltender
- Caught: Left
- Played for: Vancouver Canucks; Detroit Red Wings; Los Angeles Sharks
- Playing career: 1963–1974

George Edward "Bud" Gardner (October 8, 1942 – November 6, 2006) was a Canadian ice hockey goaltender.

== Career ==
Gardner played in the National Hockey League (NHL) for the Detroit Red Wings and Vancouver Canucks, and in the World Hockey Association (WHA) for the Los Angeles Sharks and Vancouver Blazers, in a career that lasted from 1963 until 1974. After several years with the Red Wings and their minor league affiliates, Gardner joined the Canucks as they entered the NHL in 1970, becoming their first goalie. He spent two seasons in Vancouver before leaving for the rival WHA, spending two seasons there before retiring.

== Personal life ==
Gardner died in Coconut Creek, Florida, in 2006.

== Career statistics ==
=== Regular season and playoffs ===
			Regular season									Playoffs
Season	Team	League	GP	W	L	T	MIN	GA	SO	GAA	SV%	GP	W	L	MIN	GA	SO	GAA	SV%
1961–62	Victoriaville Bruins	QPJHL	49	28	19	2	2940	172	3	3.51	—	10	7	3	600	21	2	2.10	—
1962–63	Niagara Falls Flyers	OHA	50	—	—	—	2095	100	3	2.86	—	9	—	—	540	21	0	2.33	—
1962–63	Niagara Falls Thunder	Mem-Cup	—	—	—	—	—	—	—	—	—	15	9	6	910	50	1	3.30	—
1963–64	Minneapolis Bruins	CHL	63	30	27	6	3780	235	1	3.63	.818	5	1	4	300	21	0	4.20	—
1964–65	Memphis Wings	CHL	66	25	32	9	3960	229	1	3.47	—	—	—	—	—	—	—	—	—
1965–66	Detroit Red Wings	NHL	1	1	0	0	60	1	0	1.00	.958	—	—	—	—	—	—	—	—
1965–66	Pittsburgh Hornets	AHL	66	34	30	1	3952	196	7	2.98	—	3	0	3	180	14	0	4.67	—
1966–67	Detroit Red Wings	NHL	11	3	7	0	560	36	0	3.86	.885	—	—	—	—	—	—	—	—
1966–67	Pittsburgh Hornets	AHL	28	18	6	4	1680	76	2	2.71	—	—	—	—	—	—	—	—	—
1966–67	Memphis Wings	CHL	16	4	9	3	960	72	0	4.50	—	—	—	—	—	—	—	—	—
1967–68	Detroit Red Wings	NHL	12	3	2	3	534	32	0	3.60	.888	—	—	—	—	—	—	—	—
1967–68	Fort Worth Wings	CHL	12	4	7	0	680	39	0	3.44	—	—	—	—	—	—	—	—	—
1968–69	Vancouver Canucks	WHL	53	25	18	9	3073	154	2	3.01	—	—	—	—	—	—	—	—	—
1969–70	Vancouver Canucks	WHL	62	41	14	6	3556	171	3	2.89	—	11	8	3	664	35	0	3.16	—
1970–71	Vancouver Canucks	NHL	18	6	8	1	920	52	0	3.39	.911	—	—	—	—	—	—	—	—
1970–71	Rochester Americans	AHL	4	0	1	3	240	13	0	3.25	—	—	—	—	—	—	—	—	—
1971–72	Vancouver Canucks	NHL	24	3	14	3	1232	86	0	4.19	.862	—	—	—	—	—	—	—	—
1972–73	Los Angeles Sharks	WHA	49	19	22	4	2713	149	1	3.30	.880	3	1	2	116	11	0	5.69	—
1973–74	Los Angeles Sharks	WHA	2	0	2	0	120	13	0	6.50	.800	—	—	—	—	—	—	—	—
1973–74	Vancouver Blazers	WHA	28	4	21	1	1590	125	0	4.72	.869	—	—	—	—	—	—	—	—
1973–74	Roanoke Valley Rebels	SHL	4	—	—	—	245	18	0	4.41	.882	—	—	—	—	—	—	—	—
NHL totals			66	16	31	7	3306	207	0	3.76	.887	—	—	—	—	—	—	—	—
WHA totals			79	16	31	7	3306	207	0	3.76	.873	3	1	2	116	11	0	5.69	—
