= Jarda Krupicka =

Czech ice hockey player

Jarda Krupička
- Born: March 15, 1946 (age 80) Brno, Czechoslovakia
- Height: 5 ft 9 in (175 cm)
- Weight: 165 lb (75 kg; 11 st 11 lb)
- Position: Right wing
- Played for: WHA; Los Angeles Sharks; New York Raiders; EHL; Greensboro Generals
- NHL draft: Undrafted
- Playing career: 1972–1973

Jaroslav "Jarda" Krupička (born March 15, 1946) is a Czech former professional ice hockey player.

During the 1972–73 season, Krupicka played 36 games in the World Hockey Association with the Los Angeles Sharks and New York Raiders.

== Career statistics ==
=== Regular season and playoffs ===
| | | | Regular season | | | | | Playoffs |
| Season | Team | League | GP | G | A | Pts | PIM | GP | G | A | Pts | PIM |
|---|---|---|---|---|---|---|---|---|---|---|---|---|
| 1972–73 | Greensboro–L.I. | EHL | 19 | 6 | 11 | 17 | 30 | 4 | 0 | 2 | 2 | 0 |
| 1972–73 | Los Angeles Sharks | WHA | 6 | 1 | 0 | 1 | 2 | — | — | — | — | — |
| 1972–73 | New York Raiders | WHA | 30 | 1 | 2 | 3 | 4 | — | — | — | — | — |
| WHA totals | | | 36 | 2 | 2 | 4 | 6 | — | — | — | — | — |
