= Earl Heiskala =

Canadian ice hockey player

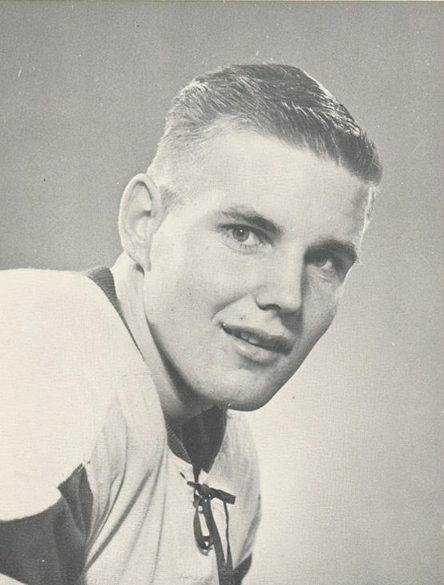
- Heiskala photo in 1961
- Born: November 30, 1942 (age 83) Kirkland Lake, Ontario, Canada
- Height: 6 ft 0 in (183 cm)
- Weight: 185 lb (84 kg; 13 st 3 lb)
- Position: Left wing
- Shot: Left
- Played for: Philadelphia Flyers; Los Angeles Sharks
- Playing career: 1963–1974

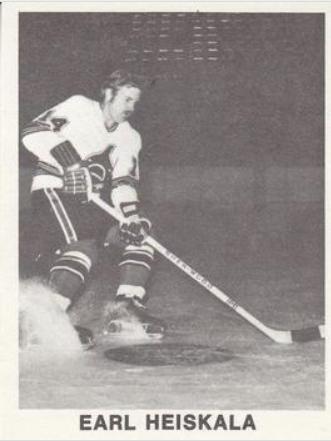
1972 card of Heiskala for Los Angeles Sharks

Earl Waldemar Heiskala (born November 30, 1942, in Kirkland Lake, Ontario) is a Canadian retired professional ice hockey player. He played 127 games in the National Hockey League with the Philadelphia Flyers from 1968 to 1971 and 94 games in the World Hockey Association with the Los Angeles Sharks from 1972 to 1974. The rest of his career, which lasted from 1963 to 1974, was spent in the minor leagues.

Heiskala is of Finnish descent.

== Career statistics ==
=== Regular season and playoffs ===
			Regular season					Playoffs
Season	Team	League	GP	G	A	Pts	PIM	GP	G	A	Pts	PIM
1960–61	Hamilton Red Wings	OHA	11	1	0	1	6	—	—	—	—	—
1961–62	Hamilton Red Wings	OHA	50	10	20	30	71	10	1	4	5	10
1961–62	Hamilton Red Wings	M-Cup	—	—	—	—	—	14	4	3	7	23
1962–63	Hamilton Red Wings	OHA	39	12	18	30	81	—	—	—	—	—
1963–64	Oakville Oaks	OHA Sr	1	0	1	1	2	—	—	—	—	—
1963–64	Cincinnati Wings	CHL	2	0	0	0	0	—	—	—	—	—
1964–65	Knoxville Knights	EHL	70	25	39	64	156	10	1	4	5	23
1965–66	Seattle Totems	WHL	64	8	10	18	107	—	—	—	—	—
1966–67	Seattle Totems	WHL	65	18	22	40	147	10	1	2	3	29
1967–68	Seattle Totems	WHL	71	26	18	44	157	9	2	2	4	8
1968–69	Philadelphia Flyers	NHL	21	3	3	6	51	—	—	—	—	—
1968–69	Quebec Aces	AHL	7	1	6	7	8	—	—	—	—	—
1968–69	Seattle Totems	WHL	34	14	9	23	69	4	1	0	1	6
1969–70	Philadelphia Flyers	NHL	65	8	7	15	171	—	—	—	—	—
1970–71	Philadelphia Flyers	NHL	41	2	1	3	72	—	—	—	—	—
1970–71	San Diego Gulls	WHL	21	6	5	11	34	5	1	0	1	4
1971–72	San Diego Gulls	WHL	72	15	22	37	169	4	1	1	2	20
1972–73	Los Angeles Sharks	WHA	70	12	17	29	148	5	1	1	2	4
1973–74	Los Angeles Sharks	WHA	24	2	6	8	45	—	—	—	—	—
1973–74	Greensboro Generals	SHL	4	2	3	5	4	—	—	—	—	—
WHA totals			94	14	23	37	193	5	1	1	2	4
NHL totals			127	13	11	24	294	—	—	—	—	—
