= Jim Watson (ice hockey) =

Canadian ice hockey player

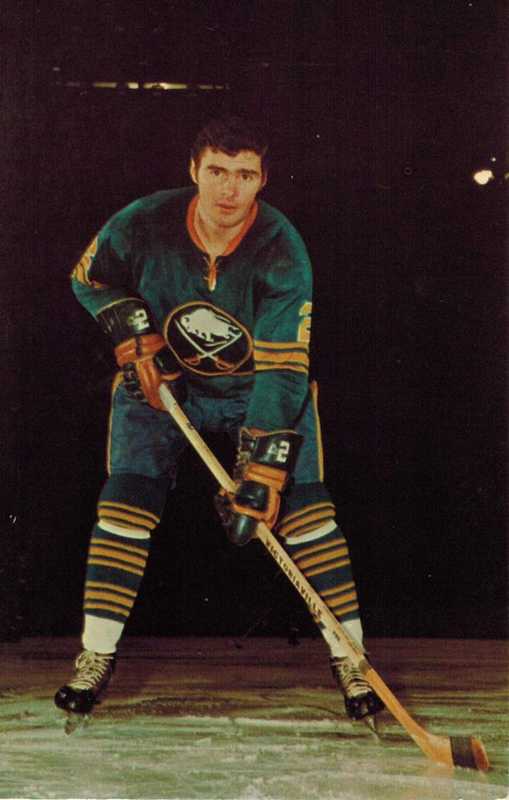
- 1971 postcard of Watson for Buffalo Sabres
- Born: June 28, 1943 (age 82) Malartic, Quebec, Canada
- Height: 6 ft 2 in (188 cm)
- Weight: 186 lb (84 kg; 13 st 4 lb)
- Position: Defence
- Shot: Left
- Played for: Detroit Red Wings; Buffalo Sabres; Los Angeles Sharks; Chicago Cougars; Quebec Nordiques
- Playing career: 1963–1976

James Arthur Watson (born June 28, 1943) is a Canadian former professional ice hockey defenceman.

== Career ==
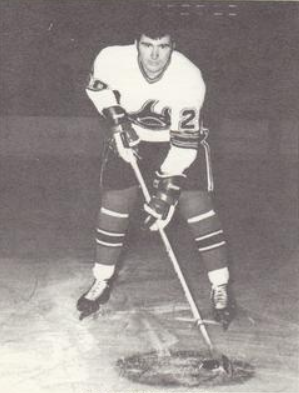
1972-73 photo of Watson for Los Angeles Sharks of the WHA

Watson played in the National Hockey League with the Detroit Red Wings and Buffalo Sabres between 1964 and 1972, and later in the World Hockey Association with the Los Angeles Sharks, Chicago Cougars, and Quebec Nordiques between 1972 and 1976.

In his NHL career, Watson played in 221 games, scoring four goals and adding nineteen assists. In the WHA, Watson played in 231 games, scoring seven goals and adding thirty-three assists. He also scored the first goal in Buffalo Sabres history on October 10, 1970, doing so against Les Binkley in a 2–1 win over the Pittsburgh Penguins.

== Career statistics ==
=== Regular season and playoffs ===
			Regular season					Playoffs
Season	Team	League	GP	G	A	Pts	PIM	GP	G	A	Pts	PIM
1961–62	Hamilton Red Wings	OHA	5	0	0	0	4	—	—	—	—	—
1962–63	Hamilton Red Wings	OHA	15	0	0	0	25	—	—	—	—	—
1963–64	Detroit Red Wings	NHL	1	0	0	0	0	—	—	—	—	—
1963–64	Cincinnati Wings	CHL	61	2	5	7	36	—	—	—	—	—
1964–65	Detroit Red Wings	NHL	1	0	0	0	2	—	—	—	—	—
1964–65	Pittsburgh Hornets	AHL	61	2	16	18	53	—	—	—	—	—
1965–66	Detroit Red Wings	NHL	2	0	0	0	4	—	—	—	—	—
1965–66	Memphis Wings	CHL	69	4	11	15	126	—	—	—	—	—
1966–67	San Diego Gulls	WHL	72	4	19	23	158	—	—	—	—	—
1967–68	Detroit Red Wings	NHL	61	0	3	3	87	—	—	—	—	—
1968–69	Detroit Red Wings	NHL	8	0	1	1	4	—	—	—	—	—
1968–69	Baltimore Clippers	AHL	25	2	8	10	58	—	—	—	—	—
1968–69	Fort Worth Wings	CHL	21	1	8	9	54	—	—	—	—	—
1969–70	Detroit Red Wings	NHL	4	0	0	0	0	—	—	—	—	—
1969–70	Cleveland Barons	AHL	59	7	19	26	128	—	—	—	—	—
1970–71	Buffalo Sabres	NHL	78	2	9	11	147	—	—	—	—	—
1971–72	Buffalo Sabres	NHL	66	2	6	8	101	—	—	—	—	—
1972–73	Los Angeles Sharks	WHA	75	5	15	20	123	4	0	1	1	2
1973–74	Los Angeles Sharks	WHA	48	0	6	6	28	—	—	—	—	—
1973–74	Greensboro Generals	SHL	2	0	1	1	0	—	—	—	—	—
1973–74	Chicago Cougars	WHA	23	0	5	5	22	18	2	3	5	18
1974–75	Chicago Cougars	WHA	57	3	6	9	31	—	—	—	—	—
1974–75	Long Island Cougars	NAHL	4	0	1	1	6	—	—	—	—	—
1975–76	Quebec Nordiques	WHA	28	0	1	1	24	—	—	—	—	—
WHA totals			231	8	33	41	228	22	2	4	6	20
NHL totals			221	4	19	23	345	—	—	—	—	—
