= Bernie MacNeil =

Canadian ice hockey player (born 1950)

- Born: March 7, 1950 (age 75); Sudbury, Ontario, Canada
- Height: 5 ft 11 in (180 cm)
- Weight: 180 lb (82 kg; 12 st 12 lb)
- Position: Left wing
- Shot: Left
- Played for: Los Angeles Sharks; St. Louis Blues; Cincinnati Stingers
- NHL draft: 82nd overall, 1970; Detroit Red Wings
- Playing career: 1970–1976

Stephen Bernard MacNeil (born March 7, 1950) is a Canadian retired professional ice hockey forward. He played 4 games in the National Hockey League for the St. Louis Blues during the 1973–74 season and 119 games in the World Hockey Association with the Los Angeles Sharks and Cincinnati Stingers during the 1972–73 and 1975–76 seasons. The rest of his career, which lasted from 1970 to 1976, was spent in the minor leagues. MacNeil was born in Sudbury, Ontario.

== Career statistics ==
=== Regular season and playoffs ===
			Regular season					Playoffs
Season	Team	League	GP	G	A	Pts	PIM	GP	G	A	Pts	PIM
1968–69	Espanola Screaming Eagles	NOJHL	48	25	21	46	165	—	—	—	—	—
1969–70	Espanola Screaming Eagles	NOJHL	40	34	47	81	276	5	3	0	3	33
1970–71	Fort Wayne Komets	IHL	69	24	21	45	121	5	2	0	2	18
1971–72	Fort Wayne Komets	IHL	67	19	13	32	140	8	0	0	0	2
1972–73	Los Angeles Sharks	WHA	42	4	7	11	48	3	0	0	0	4
1972–73	Greensboro Generals	EHL	10	6	12	18	72	—	—	—	—	—
1973–74	St. Louis Blues	NHL	4	0	0	0	0	—	—	—	—	—
1973–74	Denver Spurs	WHL	33	8	15	23	151	—	—	—	—	—
1973–74	San Diego Gulls	WHL	35	5	10	15	86	4	0	3	3	10
1974–75	Rochester Americans	AHL	9	0	1	1	12	—	—	—	—	—
1974–75	Broome Dusters	NAHL	53	12	20	32	145	15	4	5	9	55
1975–76	Cincinnati Stingers	WHA	77	15	12	27	83	—	—	—	—	—
WHA totals			119	19	19	38	131	3	0	0	0	4
NHL totals			4	0	0	0	0	—	—	—	—	—
