= Brian Derksen =

Canadian ice hockey player

- Born: November 27, 1951 (age 74) Borden, Saskatchewan, Canada
- Height: 5 ft 10 in (178 cm)
- Weight: 196 lb (89 kg; 14 st 0 lb)
- Position: Defence
- Shot: Right
- Played for: WHA; Los Angeles Sharks; EHL/SHL; Greensboro Generals; Winston-Salem Polar Twins; IHL; Muskegon Mohawks; CHL; Fort Worth Texans; Oklahoma City Blazers; AHL; Providence Reds
- NHL draft: Undrafted
- Playing career: 1971–1977

Brian Derksen (born November 27, 1951) is a Canadian former professional ice hockey defenceman.

During the 1973–74 season, Derksen played one game in the World Hockey Association with the Los Angeles Sharks.

== Career statistics ==
			Regular season					Playoffs
Season	Team	League	GP	G	A	Pts	PIM	GP	G	A	Pts	PIM
1969–70	Saskatoon Blades	WCHL	5	0	1	1	0	—	—	—	—	—
1970–71	Saskatoon Blades	WCHL	62	3	11	14	119	—	—	—	—	—
1971–72	Greensboro Generals	EHL-Sr.	22	2	9	11	65	10	1	1	2	33
1972–73	Greensboro Generals	EHL-Sr.	76	21	33	54	174	5	1	0	1	4
1973–74	Los Angeles Sharks	WHA	1	0	0	0	2	—	—	—	—	—
1973–74	Greensboro Generals	SHL-Sr.	65	7	30	37	136	6	1	3	4	9
1974–75	Muskegon Mohawks	IHL	75	4	20	24	136	12	1	5	6	21
1975–76	Fort Worth Texans	CHL	2	0	0	0	2	—	—	—	—	—
1975–76	Muskegon Mohawks	IHL	76	10	30	40	165	5	1	3	4	4
1975–76	Providence Reds	AHL	—	—	—	—	—	1	0	2	2	2
1975–76	Oklahoma City Blazers	CHL	—	—	—	—	—	2	1	0	1	2
1976–77	Winston-Salem Polar Twins	SHL-Sr.	1	0	1	1	0	—	—	—	—	—
WHA totals			1	0	0	0	2	—	—	—	—	—
IHL totals			151	14	50	64	301	17	2	8	10	25
