= Howie Heggedal =

Canadian ice hockey player

- Born: September 15, 1949 Lethbridge, Alberta, Canada
- Died: September 30, 2017 (aged 68)
- Height: 6 ft 0 in (183 cm)
- Weight: 185 lb (84 kg; 13 st 3 lb)
- Position: Forward
- Shot: Left
- Played for: WHA; Los Angeles Sharks; IHL; Toledo Hornets; EHL/SHL; Greensboro Generals; CHL; Denver Spurs; NAHL; Philadelphia Firebirds
- NHL draft: Undrafted
- Playing career: 1970–1977

Howard Leonard Heggedal (September 15, 1949 – September 30, 2017) was a Canadian professional ice hockey player. During the 1972–73 season, Heggedal played eight games in the World Hockey Association with the Los Angeles Sharks.

== Career statistics ==
=== Regular season and playoffs ===
| | | | Regular season | | | | | Playoffs |
| Season | Team | League | GP | G | A | Pts | PIM | GP | G | A | Pts | PIM |
|---|---|---|---|---|---|---|---|---|---|---|---|---|
| 1967–68 | Moose Jaw Canucks | WCJHL | 41 | 15 | 13 | 28 | 50 | — | — | — | — | — |
| 1969–70 | Calgary Centennials | WCHL | 58 | 9 | 21 | 30 | 95 | — | — | — | — | — |
| 1970–71 | Flint-Toledo | IHL | 49 | 8 | 15 | 23 | 41 | — | — | — | — | — |
| 1971–72 | Toledo Hornets | IHL | 72 | 23 | 32 | 55 | 198 | — | — | — | — | — |
| 1972–73 | Greensboro Generals | EHL | 43 | 44 | 17 | 61 | 119 | 7 | 10 | 2 | 12 | 4 |
| 1972–73 | Los Angeles Sharks | WHA | 8 | 2 | 1 | 3 | 0 | 1 | 0 | 0 | 0 | 0 |
| 1973–74 | Greensboro Generals | SHL | 71 | 51 | 35 | 86 | 72 | 6 | 7 | 4 | 11 | 12 |
| 1974–75 | Denver Spurs | CHL | 78 | 28 | 54 | 82 | 84 | 2 | 0 | 2 | 2 | 2 |
| 1975–76 | Philadelphia Firebirds | NAHL | 11 | 9 | 9 | 18 | 5 | 16 | 7 | 14 | 21 | 14 |
| 1975–76 | Greensboro Generals | SHL | 43 | 24 | 17 | 41 | 35 | — | — | — | — | — |
| 1976–77 | Philadelphia Firebirds | NAHL | 26 | 15 | 14 | 29 | 11 | 4 | 1 | 2 | 3 | 4 |
| 1976–77 | Greensboro Generals | SHL | 39 | 12 | 34 | 46 | 44 | — | — | — | — | — |
| WHA totals | | | 8 | 2 | 1 | 3 | 0 | 1 | 0 | 0 | 0 | 0 |
