= Hal Willis (ice hockey) =

Canadian ice hockey player

- Born: June 8, 1946 (age 79) Liverpool, Nova Scotia, Canada
- Height: 6 ft 0 in (183 cm)
- Weight: 205 lb (93 kg; 14 st 9 lb)
- Position: Defence
- Shot: Left
- Played for: WHA; New York Raiders; Los Angeles Sharks; EHL; Long Island Ducks; Charlotte Checkers; AHL; Rochester Americans; WHL; Seattle Totems; Denver Spurs; Phoenix Roadrunners; SHL; Greensboro Generals; Hampton Gulls
- NHL draft: Undrafted
- Playing career: 1967–1975

Harold Willis (born June 8, 1946) is a Canadian former professional ice hockey defenceman.

== Career ==
During the 1972–73 season, Willis played 74 games in the World Hockey Association (WHA) with the New York Raiders, and during the 1973–74 season he played another 18 games in the WHA with the Los Angeles Sharks.

== Career statistics ==
=== Regular season and playoffs ===
			Regular season					Playoffs
Season	Team	League	GP	G	A	Pts	PIM	GP	G	A	Pts	PIM
1966–67	Edmonton Western Movers	AJHL	Statistics Unavailable
1967–68	Long Island Ducks	EHL	72	18	37	55	215	3	0	0	0	8
1968–69	Rochester Americans	AHL	3	0	0	0	6	––	––	––	––	––
1968–69	Long Island Ducks	EHL	72	11	19	30	325	3	0	1	1	0
1969–70	Charlotte Checkers	EHL	66	20	39	59	264	6	0	2	2	17
1970–71	Charlotte Checkers	EHL	73	15	58	73	219	13	3	9	12	38
1971–72	Seattle Totems	WHL	42	3	8	11	155	––	––	––	––	––
1971–72	Denver Spurs	WHL	24	0	6	6	79	7	2	4	6	12
1972–73	New York Raiders	WHA	74	3	21	24	159	––	––	––	––	––
1973–74	Los Angeles Sharks	WHA	18	1	2	3	24	––	––	––	––	––
1973–74	Greensboro Generals	SHL	19	6	16	22	64	––	––	––	––	––
1973–74	Phoenix Roadrunners	WHL	27	2	16	18	84	––	––	––	––	––
1974–75	Hampton Gulls	SHL	70	6	50	56	148	13	1	3	4	5
WHA totals			92	4	23	27	183	—	—	—	—	—
