= Jim Niekamp =

American ice hockey player (1946–2022)

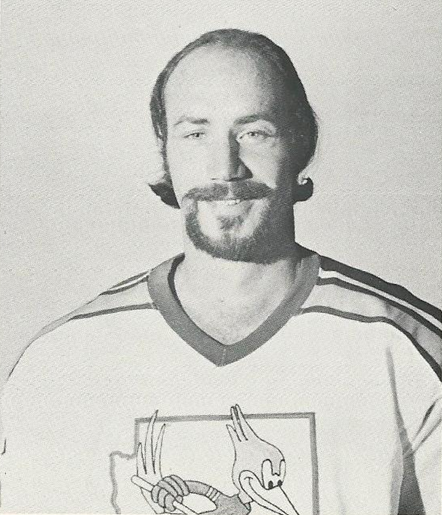
- Born: March 11, 1946 Detroit, Michigan, U.S.
- Died: October 10, 2022 (aged 76) Phoenix, Arizona, U.S.
- Height: 6 ft 0 in (183 cm)
- Weight: 170 lb (77 kg; 12 st 2 lb)
- Position: Defense
- Shot: Right
- Played for: Detroit Red Wings; Los Angeles Sharks; Phoenix Roadrunners
- Playing career: 1962–1978

James Lawrence Niekamp (March 11, 1946 – October 10, 2022) was an American professional ice hockey player who played 383 games in the World Hockey Association and 29 games in the National Hockey League from 1970 to 1977. Niekamp played for the Detroit Red Wings, Los Angeles Sharks and Phoenix Roadrunners.

Niekamp lived in the Phoenix area and was the color commentator for the radio broadcasts of Phoenix RoadRunners home games. He died on October 10, 2022, at the age of 76.

== Career statistics ==
=== Regular season and playoffs ===
			Regular season					Playoffs
Season	Team	League	GP	G	A	Pts	PIM	GP	G	A	Pts	PIM
1964–65	Saint-Jerome Alouettes	QJAHL	33	10	31	41	—	8	1	5	6	38
1965–66	Saint-Jerome Alouettes	QJAHL	32	10	15	25	135	5	1	1	2	22
1965–66	Hamilton Red Wings	OHA	11	1	6	7	55	—	—	—	—	—
1966–67	Toledo Blades	IHL	66	6	24	30	163	8	0	1	1	12
1967–68	Fort Worth Wings	CHL	49	6	9	15	76	7	0	2	2	24
1968–69	Fort Worth Wings	CHL	63	13	21	34	113	—	—	—	—	—
1969–70	Cleveland Barons	AHL	47	6	16	22	114	—	—	—	—	—
1970–71	Baltimore Clippers	AHL	46	9	29	38	93	—	—	—	—	—
1970–71	Detroit Red Wings	NHL	24	0	2	2	27	—	—	—	—	—
1971–72	Tidewater Wings	AHL	65	6	11	17	216	—	—	—	—	—
1971–72	Detroit Red Wings	NHL	5	0	0	0	10	—	—	—	—	—
1972–73	Los Angeles Sharks	WHA	78	7	22	29	155	6	2	1	3	10
1973–74	Los Angeles Sharks	WHA	76	2	19	21	95	—	—	—	—	—
1974–75	Phoenix Roadrunners	WHA	71	2	26	28	66	5	0	0	0	8
1975–76	Phoenix Roadrunners	WHA	79	4	14	18	77	5	1	0	1	0
1976–77	Phoenix Roadrunners	WHA	79	1	15	16	91	—	—	—	—	—
1977–78	Phoenix Roadrunners	PHL	23	1	11	12	12	—	—	—	—	—
WHA totals			383	16	96	112	484	16	3	1	4	18
NHL totals			29	0	2	2	37	—	—	—	—	—
