= Bob Whitlock =

Canadian ice hockey player

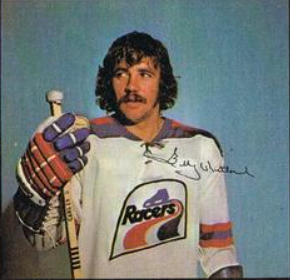
- Whitlock in 1974 card
- Born: June 16, 1949 (age 76) Charlottetown, PEI, Canada
- Height: 5 ft 10 in (178 cm)
- Weight: 175 lb (79 kg; 12 st 7 lb)
- Position: Centre
- Shot: Right
- Played for: Chicago Cougars; Los Angeles Sharks; Indianapolis Racers; Minnesota North Stars
- Playing career: 1968–1981

Robert Angus Whitlock (born July 16, 1949) is a Canadian former professional ice hockey player who played 244 games in the World Hockey Association and one game in the National Hockey League. He played for the Chicago Cougars, Los Angeles Sharks, Indianapolis Racers, and Minnesota North Stars. His lone NHL game came with the North Stars on November 22, 1969, against the Los Angeles Kings.

== Career statistics ==
=== Regular season and playoffs ===
			Regular season					Playoffs
Season	Team	League	GP	G	A	Pts	PIM	GP	G	A	Pts	PIM
1966–67	Halifax Junior Canadiens	Exhib	48	52	70	122	52	—	—	—	—	—
1966–67	Halifax Junior Canadiens	M-Cup	—	—	—	—	—	18	14	18	32	18
1967–68	Halifax Junior Canadiens	MJrHL	38	53	42	95	4	11	9	11	20	0
1967–68	Fredericton Junior Red Wings	SNBHL	5	2	3	5	28	—	—	—	—	—
1968–69	Kitchener Rangers	OHA	22	9	15	24	51	—	—	—	—	—
1968–69	Edmonton Oil Kings	WCHL	6	2	2	4	0	—	—	—	—	—
1969–70	Iowa Stars	CHL	63	26	28	54	58	11	4	3	7	4
1969–70	Minnesota North Stars	NHL	1	0	0	0	0	—	—	—	—	—
1970–71	Cleveland Barons	AHL	68	19	15	34	30	8	1	2	3	4
1971–72	Phoenix Roadrunners	WHL	64	33	46	79	69	4	2	2	4	4
1972–73	Chicago Cougars	WHA	75	23	28	51	53	—	—	—	—	—
1973–74	Chicago Cougars	WHA	52	16	19	35	44	—	—	—	—	—
1973–74	Los Angeles Sharks	WHA	14	4	10	14	4	—	—	—	—	—
1974–75	Indianapolis Racers	WHA	73	31	26	57	56	—	—	—	—	—
1975–76	Mohawk Valley Comets	NAHL	32	15	20	35	42	—	—	—	—	—
1975–76	Indianapolis Racers	WHA	30	7	15	22	16	—	—	—	—	—
1976–77	Erie Blades	NAHL	15	7	7	14	8	—	—	—	—	—
1976–77	Johnstown Jets	NAHL	20	8	8	16	26	—	—	—	—	—
1977–78	Charlottetown GJS	NBSHL	—	—	—	—	—	—	—	—	—	—
1977–78	Trail Smoke Eaters	WIHL	—	31	27	58	59	—	—	—	—	—
WHA totals			244	81	98	179	173	—	—	—	—	—
NHL totals			1	0	0	0	0	—	—	—	—	—

== See also ==
- List of players who played only one game in the NHL
