= Ron Walters (ice hockey) =

Canadian ice hockey player

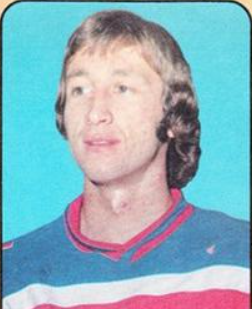
- Walters in 1972 card
- Born: March 9, 1948 (age 78) Castor, Alberta, Canada
- Height: 5 ft 11 in (180 cm)
- Weight: 175 lb (79 kg; 12 st 7 lb)
- Position: Center
- Shot: Right
- Played for: Indianapolis Racers; Edmonton Oilers; Los Angeles Sharks
- Playing career: 1966–1975

Ronald Wayne Walters (born March 9, 1948) is a retired professional ice hockey player who played 166 games in the World Hockey Association. He played for the Indianapolis Racers, Edmonton Oilers, and Los Angeles Sharks.

His father, Ron Walters Sr, was light heavyweight boxing champion of the Canadian Army in World War II and spent the first two WHA seasons as a trainer for the Oilers.

== Career statistics ==
=== Regular season and playoffs ===
			Regular season					Playoffs
Season	Team	League	GP	G	A	Pts	PIM	GP	G	A	Pts	PIM
1965–66	Edmonton Oil Kings	CAHL	Statistics Unavailable
1966–67	Edmonton Oil Kings	CMJHL	54	44	40	84	31	—	—	—	—	—
1967–68	Edmonton Oil Kings	WCJHL	58	30	53	83	22	—	—	—	—	—
1968–69	Fort Worth Wings	CHL	57	6	10	16	8	—	—	—	—	—
1969–70	Fort Worth Wings	CHL	68	23	27	50	23	7	1	1	2	0
1970–71	Fort Worth Wings	CHL	72	25	44	69	15	4	2	1	3	0
1971–72	Tidewater Wings	AHL	75	14	27	41	21	—	—	—	—	—
1971–72	Fort Worth Wings	CHL	2	0	0	0	4	—	—	—	—	—
1972–73	Alberta Oilers	WHA	78	28	26	54	37	1	1	0	1	0
1973–74	Los Angeles Sharks	WHA	71	14	14	28	28	—	—	—	—	—
1974–75	Indianapolis Racers	WHA	17	2	1	3	9	—	—	—	—	—
1974–75	Mohawk Valley Comets	NAHL	56	26	20	46	17	4	0	2	2	7
WHA totals			166	44	41	85	74	1	1	0	1	0
