= Brian McDonald (ice hockey) =

Canadian ice hockey player

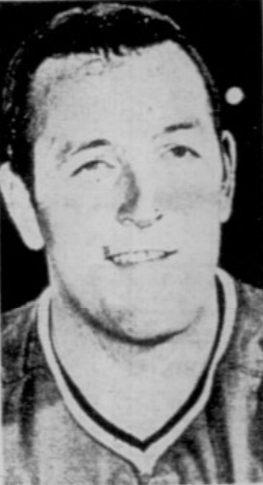
- McDonald in 1969
- Born: March 23, 1945 (age 81) Toronto, Ontario, Canada
- Height: 5 ft 11 in (180 cm)
- Weight: 190 lb (86 kg; 13 st 8 lb)
- Position: Centre
- Shot: Right
- Played for: Chicago Black Hawks; Buffalo Sabres; Houston Aeros; Los Angeles Sharks; Michigan Stags; Indianapolis Racers (WHA)
- Playing career: 1964–1977

Brian Harold McDonald (born March 23, 1945) is a Canadian former professional ice hockey centre.

== Career ==
McDonald played 20 games in the National Hockey League, with eight being playoff games with the Chicago Black Hawks during the 1967–68 season. In August 1969, he was acquired by the Denver Spurs of the Western Hockey League, with the Black Hawks having the option to buy his contract after the season ended. Described as being able to work "either center or right wing...has a hard, quick, accurate shot", he had 34 goals in 70 goals with Denver, who purchased his contract during the season. McDonald ultimately did make an NHL roster in the 1970–71 regular season but with the expansion team Buffalo Sabres, who acquired him in the inter-league draft for $30,000. He played the first game on October 10 (where he recorded 17 penalty minutes) and ultimately played twelve of the first 14 games but recorded no goals or assists. He went down to the WHL in November 1970 with the Salt Lake Golden Eagles. He played the following season with the San Diego Gulls.

When the upstart World Hockey Association came around in 1972, McDonald was among the players drafted by the Houston Aeros. He had 20 goals in his one season with the team. He also had three goals in the 1973 WHA playoffs. He played for the Los Angeles Sharks the following year, where he recorded another 20-goal season. When the team moved to Michigan to be the Michigan Stags, he played 18 games for the team before latching onto to the Indianapolis Racers between 1972 and 1977, where he finished with 17 goals. He played two more seasons with the Racers, having 16 and 15 goals. He played 304 games in the league, which was among the top 125 for players in the professional league.

== Career statistics ==
=== Regular season and playoffs ===
			Regular season					Playoffs
Season	Team	League	GP	G	A	Pts	PIM	GP	G	A	Pts	PIM
1962–63	Weston Dodgers	MetJBHL	31	30	30	60	—	—	—	—	—	—
1963–64	St. Catharines Black Hawks	OHA	56	31	44	75	98	13	7	11	18	28
1964–65	St. Catharines Black Hawks	OHA	56	47	61	108	100	5	4	2	6	34
1964–65	St. Louis Braves	CPHL	3	0	1	1	0	—	—	—	—	—
1964–65	Buffalo Bisons	AHL	1	0	1	1	0	—	—	—	—	—
1965–66	St. Louis Braves	CPHL	70	13	33	46	45	5	1	2	3	2
1966–67	St. Louis Braves	CPHL	67	10	33	43	59	—	—	—	—	—
1967–68	Dallas Black Hawks	CPHL	67	24	45	69	104	5	0	4	4	21
1967–68	Chicago Black Hawks	NHL	—	—	—	—	—	8	0	0	0	2
1968–69	Dallas Black Hawks	CHL	67	19	41	60	65	11	7	6	13	28
1969–70	Denver Spurs	WHL	70	34	34	68	54	—	—	—	—	—
1970–71	Buffalo Sabres	NHL	12	0	0	0	29	—	—	—	—	—
1970–71	Salt Lake Golden Eagles	WHL	56	29	18	47	70	—	—	—	—	—
1971–72	San Diego Gulls	WHL	63	24	22	46	88	4	0	1	1	24
1972–73	Houston Aeros	WHA	71	20	20	40	78	10	3	0	3	16
1973–74	Los Angeles Sharks	WHA	56	22	30	52	54	—	—	—	—	—
1974–75	Michigan Stags	WHA	18	3	5	8	15	—	—	—	—	—
1974–75	Indianapolis Racers	WHA	47	14	15	29	19	—	—	—	—	—
1975–76	Indianapolis Racers	WHA	62	16	17	33	54	7	0	1	1	12
1975–76	Mohawk Valley Comets	NAHL	10	5	9	14	17	—	—	—	—	—
1976–77	Indianapolis Racers	WHA	50	15	13	28	48	9	3	4	7	33
WHA totals			304	87	74	161	212	4	0	1	1	24
NHL totals			12	0	0	0	29	8	0	0	0	2
