= Don Gordon (ice hockey) =

Canadian ice hockey player

- Born: April 17, 1948 (age 78) Timmins, Ontario, Canada
- Height: 5 ft 11 in (180 cm)
- Weight: 181 lb (82 kg; 12 st 13 lb)
- Position: Right wing
- Shot: Right
- Played for: Los Angeles Sharks; Chicago Cougars
- Playing career: 1969–1975

Don Gordon (born April 17, 1948) is a Canadian former professional ice hockey winger who played 94 games in the World Hockey Association. He played with the Chicago Cougars and Los Angeles Sharks.

== Career statistics ==
=== Regular season and playoffs ===
| | | | Regular season | | | | | Playoffs |
| Season | Team | League | GP | G | A | Pts | PIM | GP | G | A | Pts | PIM |
|---|---|---|---|---|---|---|---|---|---|---|---|---|
| 1967–68 | Sarnia Legionnaires | WOJBHL | Statistics Unavailable |
| 1968–69 | Sarnia Legionnaires | WOJAHL | Statistics Unavailable |
| 1969–70 | Dallas Black Hawks | CHL | 67 | 14 | 20 | 34 | 28 | –– | –– | –– | –– | –– |
| 1970–71 | Dallas Black Hawks | CHL | 72 | 31 | 29 | 60 | 14 | 10 | 3 | 2 | 5 | 9 |
| 1971–72 | Dallas Black Hawks | CHL | 49 | 16 | 23 | 39 | 21 | 12 | 0 | 4 | 4 | 6 |
| 1972–73 | Dallas Black Hawks | CHL | 72 | 28 | 35 | 63 | 68 | 3 | 3 | 0 | 3 | 0 |
| 1973–74 | Greensboro Generals | SHL | 8 | 7 | 3 | 10 | 2 | –– | –– | –– | –– | –– |
| 1973–74 | Los Angeles Sharks | WHA | 29 | 8 | 6 | 14 | 24 | –– | –– | –– | –– | –– |
| 1973–74 | Chicago Cougars | WHA | 23 | 5 | 4 | 9 | 9 | 18 | 4 | 8 | 12 | 4 |
| 1974–75 | Long Island Cougars | NAHL | 3 | 1 | 1 | 2 | 2 | –– | –– | –– | –– | –– |
| 1974–75 | Chicago Cougars | WHA | 42 | 4 | 5 | 9 | 10 | –– | –– | –– | –– | –– |
| WHA totals | | | 94 | 17 | 15 | 32 | 43 | 18 | 4 | 8 | 12 | 4 |
