= Russ Gillow =

Canadian ice hockey player

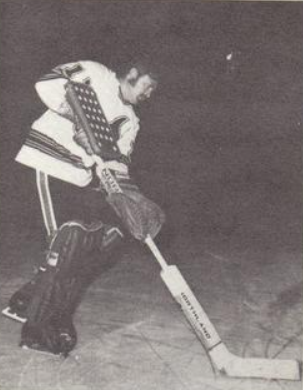
- Gillow in 1972 photo
- Born: September 2, 1939 (age 86) Hespeler, Ontario, Canada
- Height: 5 ft 10 in (178 cm)
- Weight: 165 lb (75 kg; 11 st 11 lb)
- Position: Goaltender
- Caught: Left
- Played for: Los Angeles Sharks; San Diego Mariners
- Playing career: 1960–1976

Russell Howard Gillow (born September 2, 1939 in Hespeler, Ontario) is a retired professional ice hockey player who played 109 games in the World Hockey Association with the Los Angeles Sharks and San Diego Mariners. As a 32-year-old rookie in the 1972–73 WHA season, Gillow was 2nd to Cleveland's Gerry Cheevers in lowest goals against average and helped the Los Angeles Sharks to a 3rd-place finish and playoff berth. It was Gillow who was behind the net when Bobby Hull of the Winnipeg Jets scored his 77th goal on April 6, 1975 in the 1974–75 WHA season to set a then-record for goals in a season by a professional hockey player.

Gillow was an emergency backup goalie for the Philadelphia Flyers on February 1, 1972, against the California Golden Seals.

== Career statistics ==
=== Regular season and playoffs ===
			Regular season									Playoffs
Season	Team	League	GP	W	L	T	MIN	GA	SO	GAA	SV%	GP	W	L	MIN	GA	SO	GAA	SV%
1959–60	Edmonton Oil Kings	CAHL	Statistics Unavailable
1960–61	Edmonton Flyers	WHL	1	-	-	-	-	2	0	2.00	.923	–	–	–	–	–	–	–	–
1960–61	Milwaukee Falcons	IHL	7	1	5	0	-	46	0	6.57	.829	–	–	–	–	–	–	–	–
1960–61	Lacombe Rockets	CAHL	Statistics Unavailable
1961–62	Edmonton Flyers	WHL	1	Statistics Unavailable
1961–62	Lacombe Rockets	CAHL	0	Statistics Unavailable
1962–63	Edmonton Flyers	WHL	2	-	-	-	-	11	5.50	.853	–	–	–	–	–	–	–	–	–
1962–63	Lacombe Rockets	CAHL	Statistics Unavailable
1962–63	Los Angeles Blades	WHL	Statistics Unavailable
1963–64	Knoxville Knights	EHL	16	Statistics Unavailable
1966–67	Des Moines Oak Leafs	IHL	71	–	–	–	–	–	–	–	–	7	–	–	–	–	–	–	–
1967–68	Oklahoma City Blazers	CPHL	43	25	8	9	2524	91	8	2.16	.911	7	–	–	–	–	–	–	–
1968–69	Oklahoma City Blazers	CHL	49	-	-	-	2870	143	1	2.99	-	10	–	–	–	–	–	–	–
1969–70	Salt Lake Golden Eagles	WHL	32	-	-	-	1899	143	1	4.52	-	–	–	–	–	–	–	–	–
1969–70	Seattle Totems	WHL	-	-	-	790	39	0	2.96	-	5	–	–	–	–	–	–	–	–
1970–71	Drumheller Miners	ASHL	Statistics Unavailable
1970–71	Calgary Stampeders	ASHL	Statistics Unavailable
1970–71	Seattle Totems	WHL	3	0	2	0	140	11	0	4.72	.843	–	–	–	–	–	–	–	–
1971–72	Spokane Jets	WIHL	28	-	-	-	97	0	3.40	.880	–	–	–	–	–	–	–	–	–
1972–73	Los Angeles Sharks	WHA	38	17	13	2	1982	96	2	2.88	.887	5	1	2	247	12	0	2.91
1973–74	Los Angeles Sharks	WHA	18	4	13	0	1041	69	1	3.98	.857	–	–	–	–	–	–	–	–
1973–74	Greensboro Generals	SHL	2	1	1	0	100	7	0	4.20	.868	–	–	–	–	–	–	–	–
1973–74	Syracuse Blazers	NAHL	9	-	-	-	550	26	1	2.84	-	9	–	–	–	–	–	–	–
1974–75	Syracuse Blazers	NAHL	2	2	0	0	129	4	1.86	-	–	–	–	–	–	–	–	–	–
1974–75	San Diego Mariners	WHA	30	15	11	2	1653	94	1	3.41	.891	3	0	0	79	5	0	3.80
1975–76	San Diego Mariners	WHA	23	1	10	2	1037	74	0	4.28	.870	1	0	0	20	0	0	0.00
1982–83	Spokane Chiefs	WIHL	Statistics Unavailable
WHA totals			109	37	47	6	5713	333	4	3.50	.880	9	1	2	346	17	0	2.95	-
