= Ron Garwasiuk =

Canadian ice hockey player (born 1949)

- Born: February 17, 1949 (age 77) St. Paul, Alberta, Canada
- Height: 5 ft 8 in (173 cm)
- Weight: 154 lb (70 kg; 11 st 0 lb)
- Position: Left wing
- Played for: WHA; Los Angeles Sharks; AHL; Providence Reds; Rochester Americans
- NHL draft: 21st overall, 1969; Detroit Red Wings
- Playing career: 1969–1980

Ron Garwasiuk (born February 17, 1949) is a Canadian retired professional ice hockey player. He played one season of major league hockey with the Los Angeles Sharks of the World Hockey Association (WHA).

Garwasiuk played junior hockey with the Regina Pats, and he led the Pats to win the 1969 Abbott Cup by scoring a team record 63 points in 28 play-off games.

Selected by the Detroit Red Wings in the 2nd round (21st overall) of the 1969 NHL entry draft, Garwasiuk began his professional career in 1969 with the Fort Worth Wings of the Central Hockey League - the minor league affiliate for the Detroit Red Wings.

Garwasiuk played 51 games of major league hockey during the 1973–74 season with the Los Angeles Sharks of the WHA, and the next six seasons in the American Hockey League (AHL) as a member of the Rochester Americans before retiring as a player following the 1979–80 AHL season.

In 1992 Garwasiuk was inducted into the Rochester Americans Hall of Fame.

== Career statistics ==
=== Regular season and playoffs ===
			Regular season					Playoffs
Season	Team	League	GP	G	A	Pts	PIM	GP	G	A	Pts	PIM
1966–67	Regina Pats	CMJHL	56	30	35	65	0	––	––	––	––	––
1967–68	Regina Pats	WCJHL	58	56	43	99	153	––	––	––	––	––
1968–69	Regina Pats	SJHL	Statistics Unavailable
1969–70	Fort Worth Wings	CHL	53	13	14	27	89	4	0	0	0	9
1970–71	Providence Reds	AHL	71	31	24	55	96	10	3	3	6	41
1971–72	Providence Reds	AHL	60	27	22	49	146	5	1	0	1	2
1972–73	Providence Reds	AHL	42	19	8	27	90	2	0	0	0	2
1973–74	Los Angeles Sharks	WHA	51	6	13	19	100	––	––	––	––	––
1974–75	Rochester Americans	AHL	67	36	32	68	141	12	2	6	8	15
1975–76	Rochester Americans	AHL	58	19	25	44	88	7	2	5	7	8
1976–77	Rochester Americans	AHL	68	32	42	74	141	12	2	3	5	15
1977–78	Rochester Americans	AHL	78	29	51	80	174	6	3	2	5	33
1978–79	Rochester Americans	AHL	20	5	5	10	33	––	––	––	––	––
1979–80	Rochester Americans	AHL	51	9	23	32	78	1	0	0	0	0
WHA totals			51	6	13	19	100	—	—	—	—	—

== Awards and honours ==
Honours	Year
CMJHL Rookie of Year	1966–67
WCJHL First Team All-Star 1967-68 (Regina)	1967–68
AHL Second Team All-Star	1976–77
