= Ian Wilkie =

Canadian ice hockey player (b. 1949)

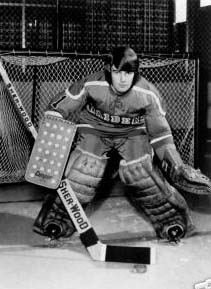
- Wilkie with the New York Raiders in the 1972–73 WHA season
- Born: July 20, 1949 (age 77) Edmonton, Alberta, Canada
- Height: 5 ft 9 in (175 cm)
- Weight: 160 lb (73 kg; 11 st 6 lb)
- Position: Goaltender
- Caught: Left
- Played for: New York Raiders; Los Angeles Sharks; Edmonton Oilers
- NHL draft: 74th overall, 1969; Montreal Canadiens
- Playing career: 1972–1974

Ian Wilkie (born July 20, 1949) is a Canadian former professional ice hockey goaltender. He played in the World Hockey Association (WHA) for the New York Raiders, Los Angeles Sharks, and Edmonton Oilers.

Born in Edmonton, Alberta, Wilkie played major junior hockey with the hometown Edmonton Oil Kings, joining the team for the 1966–67 season, and was their starting goaltender from 1967–68 to 1969–70.

Wilkie's son is Edmonton-based firefighter and politician Jordan Wilkie.

== Career statistics ==
=== Regular season and playoffs ===
			Regular season									Playoffs
Season	Team	League	GP	W	L	T	MIN	GA	SO	GAA	SV%	GP	W	L	MIN	GA	SO	GAA	SV%
1966–67	Edmonton Oil Kings	CMJHL	Statistics Unavailable
1967–68	Edmonton Oil Kings	WCJHL	51	–	–	–	–	162	3	3.18	.894	–	–	–	–	–	–	–	–
1968-69	Edmonton Oil Kings	WCHL	51	–	–	–	–	159	4	3.10	.898	–	–	–	–	–	–	–	–
1969-70	Edmonton Oil Kings	WCHL	Statistics Unavailable
1970–71	University of British Columbia	CIAU	Statistics Unavailable
1971–72	University of British Columbia	CIAU	Statistics Unavailable
1972–73	Long Island Ducks	EHL	5	–	–	–	–	11	0	2.20	–	–	–	–	–	–	–	–	–
1972–73	New York Raiders	WHA	5	1	3	0	253	27	0	6.40	.843	–	–	–	–	–	–	–	–
1973–74	Greensboro Generals	SHL	4	2	2	0	195	20	0	6.18	.862	–	–	–	–	–	–	–	–
1973–74	Los Angeles Sharks	WHA	23	11	9	0	1257	82	1	3.92	.861	–	–	–	–	–	–	–	–
1973–74	Edmonton Oilers	WHA	5	3	1	1	256	9	0	2.11	.930	1	0	1	41	4	0	5.85
WHA totals			33	15	3	1	1766	118	1	4.01	.868	1	0	1	41	4	0	5.85
