= Steve Sutherland (ice hockey) =

Canadian ice hockey player

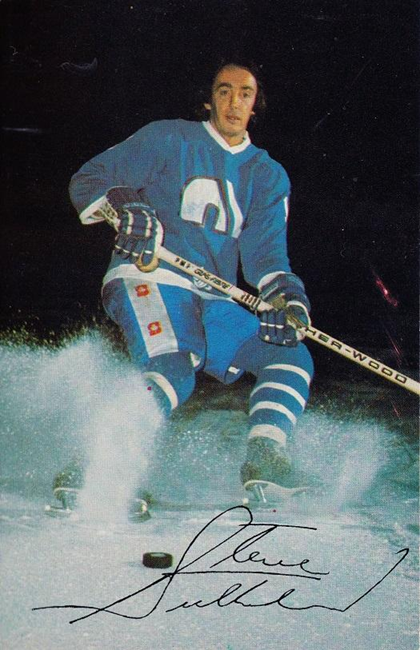
- Sutherland in 1976 postcard
- Born: September 1, 1946 (age 79) Rouyn-Noranda, Quebec, Canada
- Height: 5 ft 11 in (180 cm)
- Weight: 172 lb (78 kg; 12 st 4 lb)
- Position: Left wing
- Shot: Left
- Played for: Quebec Nordiques; Los Angeles Sharks; Michigan Stags
- Playing career: 1966–1978

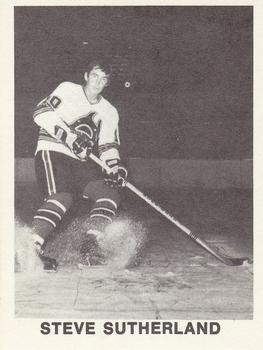
Sutherland in card for Los Angeles Kings

Steve Sutherland (born September 1, 1946) is a Canadian retired professional ice hockey winger who played 379 games in the World Hockey Association. He was a member of the Quebec Nordiques, Los Angeles Sharks, and Michigan Stags.

He served an assistant coach for the Jets for the 1978-79 season.

== Career statistics ==
=== Regular season and playoffs ===
| | | | Regular season | | | | | Playoffs |
| Season | Team | League | GP | G | A | Pts | PIM | GP | G | A | Pts | PIM |
|---|---|---|---|---|---|---|---|---|---|---|---|---|
| 1966–67 | Montreal Junior Canadiens | OHA | 46 | 7 | 15 | 22 | 96 | — | — | — | — | — |
| 1967–68 | Memphis South Stars | CPHL | 68 | 9 | 14 | 23 | 52 | 3 | 0 | 0 | 0 | 0 |
| 1968–69 | Des Moines Oak Leafs | IHL | 46 | 23 | 25 | 48 | 8 | — | — | — | — | — |
| 1968–69 | Memphis South Stars | CHL | 20 | 4 | 3 | 7 | 35 | — | — | — | — | — |
| 1969–70 | Des Moines Oak Leafs | IHL | 70 | 26 | 43 | 69 | 87 | 8 | 4 | 7 | 11 | 15 |
| 1970–71 | Port Huron Flags | IHL | 72 | 28 | 43 | 71 | 154 | 14 | 3 | 8 | 11 | 56 |
| 1971–72 | Port Huron Wings | IHL | 52 | 21 | 23 | 44 | 207 | 15 | 6 | 7 | 13 | 43 |
| 1972–73 | Los Angeles Sharks | WHA | 44 | 11 | 6 | 17 | 98 | 6 | 0 | 2 | 2 | 8 |
| 1973–74 | Los Angeles Sharks | WHA | 72 | 20 | 12 | 32 | 182 | — | — | — | — | — |
| 1974–75 | Michigan Stags/Baltimore Blades | WHA | 22 | 1 | 5 | 6 | 37 | — | — | — | — | — |
| 1974–75 | Quebec Nordiques | WHA | 56 | 14 | 15 | 29 | 114 | 13 | 0 | 3 | 3 | 34 |
| 1975–76 | Quebec Nordiques | WHA | 74 | 22 | 19 | 41 | 197 | 5 | 2 | 1 | 3 | 17 |
| 1976–77 | Quebec Nordiques | WHA | 36 | 6 | 9 | 15 | 34 | 17 | 5 | 0 | 5 | 16 |
| 1977–78 | Quebec Nordiques | WHA | 75 | 23 | 10 | 33 | 143 | 11 | 2 | 0 | 2 | 37 |
| WHA totals | | | 379 | 97 | 76 | 173 | 805 | 52 | 9 | 6 | 15 | 112 |
