= Ralph MacSweyn =

Canadian ice hockey player

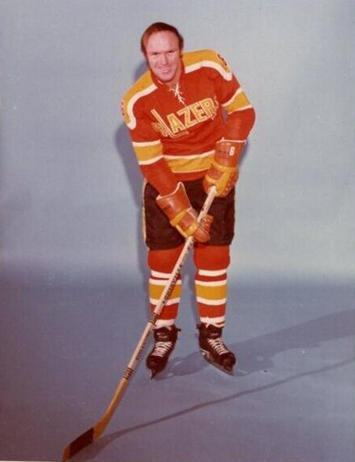
- Born: September 8, 1942 Hawkesbury, Ontario, Canada
- Died: May 27, 1995 (aged 52) Glengarry, Ontario, Canada
- Height: 5 ft 11 in (180 cm)
- Weight: 190 lb (86 kg; 13 st 8 lb)
- Position: Defence
- Shot: Right
- Played for: Philadelphia Flyers; Los Angeles Sharks; Vancouver Blazers
- Playing career: 1964–1977

Donald Ralph "Big Mac" MacSweyn (September 8, 1942 – May 27, 1995) was a Canadian professional ice hockey defenceman. He played 47 games in the National Hockey League (NHL) with the Philadelphia Flyers from 1968 to 1972 and 147 games in the World Hockey Association (WHA) with the Los Angeles Sharks and Vancouver Blazers from 1972 to 1974. The rest of his career, which lasted from 1964 to 1978, was spent in the minor leagues.

== Playing career ==
A native of Laggan, Ontario, MacSweyn played for teams in the NHL, EHL, WHL, AHL, WHA, SHL, NAHL, SLSHL, and the OIHA.

MacSweyn was a member of the EHL North First All-Star Team in 1967, member of the AHL First All-Star Team in 1971, and a member of the AHL Second All-Star Team in 1972.

== Later life and death ==
MacSweyn retired from playing hockey in 1977. After his retirement, MacSweyn returned to his family farm and also was involved in coaching his daughter's hockey team. In 1993 MacSweyn was inducted into the Glengarry Sports Hall of Fame in Glengarry, Ontario. On May 27, 1995, MacSweyn died in Glengarry, Ontario, at the age of 52. He was survived by his wife and two daughters.

== Career statistics ==
=== Regular season and playoffs ===
			Regular season					Playoffs
Season	Team	League	GP	G	A	Pts	PIM	GP	G	A	Pts	PIM
1964–65	Johnstown Jets	EHL	28	2	17	19	35	5	0	1	1	6
1965–66	Johnstown Jets	EHL	71	6	26	32	38	3	0	0	0	0
1966–67	Johnstown Jets	EHL	72	6	28	34	82	5	0	3	3	6
1966–67	Portland Buckaroos	WHL	1	0	0	0	0	—	—	—	—	—
1967–68	Philadelphia Flyers	NHL	4	0	0	0	0	—	—	—	—	—
1967–68	Quebec Aces	AHL	51	2	11	13	56	15	0	8	8	37
1968–69	Philadelphia Flyers	NHL	24	0	4	4	6	4	0	0	0	4
1968–69	Quebec Aces	AHL	41	1	12	13	30	—	—	—	—	—
1969–70	Philadelphia Flyers	NHL	17	0	0	0	4	—	—	—	—	—
1969–70	Quebec Aces	AHL	54	2	19	21	31	6	0	3	3	9
1970–71	Quebec Aces	AHL	72	2	24	26	50	1	0	0	0	2
1970–71	Philadelphia Flyers	NHL	—	—	—	—	—	4	0	0	0	2
1971–72	Philadelphia Flyers	NHL	2	0	1	1	0	—	—	—	—	—
1971–72	Richmond Robins	AHL	60	0	15	15	52	—	—	—	—	—
1972–73	Los Angeles Sharks	WHA	78	0	23	23	39	6	1	2	3	4
1973–74	Los Angeles Sharks	WHA	13	0	3	3	6	—	—	—	—	—
1973–74	Vancouver Blazers	WHA	56	2	18	20	52	—	—	—	—	—
1974–75	Richmond Robins	AHL	54	1	6	7	32	6	0	3	3	6
1975–76	Baltimore Clippers	AHL	74	4	8	12	42	—	—	—	—	—
1976–77	Richmond Wildcats	SHL	37	1	6	7	10	—	—	—	—	—
1976–77	Johnstown Jets	NAHL	26	0	7	7	10	3	0	2	2	0
WHA totals			147	2	44	46	97	6	1	2	3	4
NHL totals			47	0	5	5	10	8	0	0	0	6
