= Jerry Zrymiak =

Canadian ice hockey player

- Born: October 19, 1946 (age 79) Regina, Saskatchewan, Canada
- Height: 6 ft 1 in (185 cm)
- Weight: 195 lb (88 kg; 13 st 13 lb)
- Position: Defence
- Shot: Right
- Played for: Los Angeles Sharks; Michigan Stags; Toronto Toros; Minnesota Fighting Saints
- Playing career: 1972–1977

Jerry Zrymiak (born October 19, 1946 in Glenavon, Saskatchewan) is a Canadian retired professional ice hockey player who played 155 games in the World Hockey Association for the Michigan Stags, Los Angeles Sharks, Toronto Toros, and Minnesota Fighting Saints.

Jerry became the head coach and assistant coach of the Regina Pat Blues and later the head coach of the Regina Pats of the Western Hockey League.

Regina Red Sox of the WMBL Jerry was a standout infielder and played with the Red Sox 1979-1985.

Jerry currently still resides in Regina, Saskatchewan, Canada with his wife.

== Career statistics ==
=== Regular season and playoffs ===
			Regular season					Playoffs
Season	Team	League	GP	G	A	Pts	PIM	GP	G	A	Pts	PIM
1967–68	Regina Capitals	SSHL	Statistics Unavailable
1970–71	Regina Capitals	SSHL	Statistics Unavailable
1971–72	Regina Capitals	PrHL	––	23	34	57	65	––	––	––	––	––
1972–73	Greensboro Generals	EHL	63	6	34	40	80	7	1	3	4	0
1972–73	Los Angeles Sharks	WHA	1	0	0	0	0	2	1	0	1	2
1973–74	Los Angeles Sharks	WHA	27	2	8	10	8	––	––	––	––	––
1973–74	Greensboro Generals	SHL	54	3	29	32	95	––	––	––	––	––
1974–75	Greensboro Generals	SHL	23	4	15	19	35	––	––	––	––	––
1974–75	Michigan Stags/Baltimore Blades	WHA	48	3	9	12	53	––	––	––	––	––
1975–76	Johnstown Jets	NAHL	42	5	30	35	53	––	––	––	––	––
1975–76	Toronto Toros	WHA	17	0	5	5	21	––	––	––	––	––
1975–76	Minnesota Fighting Saints	WHA	22	0	8	8	16	––	––	––	––	––
1976–77	Minnesota Fighting Saints	WHA	40	2	10	12	14	––	––	––	––	––
WHA totals			155	7	40	47	112	2	1	0	1	2
