= 1973–74 Southern Hockey League season =

Southern Hockey League
The original six teams in 1973–74.
Teams from the EHL Expansion teams

The 1973–74 Southern Hockey League season was the first season of the Southern Hockey League. The league was formed when the Eastern Hockey League split in two; the southern teams became the Southern Hockey League, and the northern teams became the North American Hockey League. Four of the six founding members of the SHL came from the EHL, including the Charlotte Checkers, Greensboro Generals, Roanoke Valley Rebels, and the Suncoast Suns. Two expansion teams were added to complete the league, including the Macon Whoopees, and the Winston-Salem Polar Twins.

Six teams began the season, but two did not complete the schedule due to financial trouble. The Suncoast Suns folded on December 19, 1973. The Macon Whoopees forfeited a game against Charlotte on January 17, 1974 when players refused to play because of not being paid. The team eventually folded on February 15, 1974. The remaining four teams made the playoffs, with the Roanoke Valley Rebels finishing as James Crockett Cup champions.

== Standings ==
Final standings of the regular season.

	GP	W	L	T	GF	GA	Pts
Roanoke Valley Rebels	72	53	19	0	366	244	106
Charlotte Checkers	72	44	27	1	309	227	86
Greensboro Generals	71	33	37	1	285	310	67
Winston-Salem Polar Twins	72	26	44	2	283	363	54
Macon Whoopees	62	22	38	2	244	290	46
Suncoast Suns	31	9	22	0	123	176	18

== WHA/NHL affiliations ==
Southern Hockey League franchises were primarily affiliated with World Hockey Association teams, however some also had agreements with National Hockey League teams. Summary of WHA/NHL affiliation agreements:

SHL team	WHA parent clubs	NHL parent clubs
Charlotte Checkers	none	Buffalo Sabres
Greensboro Generals	Los Angeles Sharks	none
Macon Whoopees	Houston Aeros; Cleveland Crusaders	none
Roanoke Valley Rebels	Vancouver Blazers	none
Suncoast Suns	Minnesota Fighting Saints; New England Whalers	none
Winston-Salem Polar Twins	Edmonton Oilers; New York Golden Blades/Jersey Knights	none

== Scoring leaders ==
Top 10 SHL points scoring leaders.

Rank	Player	Team	Goals	Assists	Points
1	Garry Swain	Charlotte	34	64	98
2	Claude Piche	Roanoke Valley	44	50	94
3	Camille LaPierre	Roanoke Valley	48	43	91
4	Wayne Chrysler	Charlotte	28	61	89
5	Howie Heggedal	Greensboro	51	35	86
6	Guy Burrowes	Charlotte	29	52	81
6	Howie Colborne	Winston-Salem	33	48	81
6	Michel Boudreau	Roanoke Valley	33	48	81
9	Kirk Bowman	Greensboro	23	55	78
9	Brian Carlin	Winston-Salem	36	42	78

== Playoffs ==
James Crockett Cup playoffs.

Semifinals
1	Roanoke Valley Rebels	4
4	Winston-Salem Polar Twins	3
2	Charlotte Checkers	4
3	Greensboro Generals	2

Final
1	Roanoke Valley Rebels	4
2	Charlotte Checkers	3
