= Peter Slater (ice hockey) =

Canadian ice hockey player

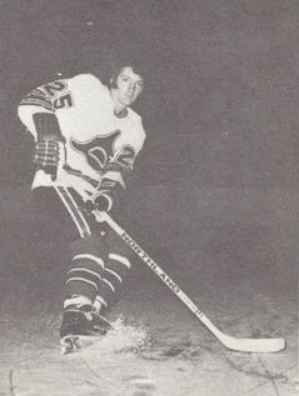
- Slater in 1972 photo
- Born: January 31, 1948 (age 78) Renfrew, Ontario, Canada
- Height: 5 ft 9 in (175 cm)
- Weight: 170 lb (77 kg; 12 st 2 lb)
- Position: Centre
- Shot: Left
- Played for: WHA; Los Angeles Sharks; IHL; Des Moines Oak Leafs; Des Moines Capitols; Kalamazoo Wings
- NHL draft: Undrafted
- Playing career: 1970–1976

Peter Slater (born January 31, 1948) is a Canadian former professional ice hockey player. During the 1972–73 and 1973–74 seasons, Slater played 91 games in the World Hockey Association with the Los Angeles Sharks.

== Career statistics ==
=== Regular season and playoffs ===
			Regular season					Playoffs
Season	Team	League	GP	G	A	Pts	PIM	GP	G	A	Pts	PIM
1966–67	St. Lawrence University	ECAC	13	1	9	10	0	—	—	—	—	—
1967–68	St. Lawrence University	ECAC	25	14	9	23	0	—	—	—	—	—
1968–69	St. Lawrence University	ECAC	24	14	12	26	44	—	—	—	—	—
1970–71	Des Moines Oak Leafs	IHL	48	11	16	27	75	14	6	4	10	38
1971–72	Des Moines Oak Leafs	IHL	67	27	27	54	151	3	2	0	2	2
1972–73	Los Angeles Sharks	WHA	73	12	12	24	87	6	0	0	0	2
1973–74	Los Angeles Sharks	WHA	19	1	1	2	2	—	—	—	—	—
1973–74	Denver Spurs	WHL	46	9	11	20	23	—	—	—	—	—
1974–75	Des Moines Capitols	IHL	74	34	34	68	43	7	3	2	5	2
1975–76	Kalamazoo Wings	IHL	70	4	26	30	86	6	1	1	2	0
WHA totals			92	13	13	26	89	6	0	0	0	2
