= Ted Hodgson =

Canadian ice hockey player

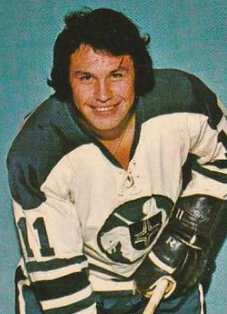
- Hodgson in 1972–73
- Born: June 30, 1945 (age 81) Maskwacis, Alberta, Canada
- Height: 5 ft 11 in (180 cm)
- Weight: 185 lb (84 kg; 13 st 3 lb)
- Position: Right wing
- Shot: Right
- Played for: Boston Bruins
- Playing career: 1965–1977

Edward James "Ted" Hodgson (born June 30, 1945) is a Canadian former professional ice hockey forward. He played four games in the National Hockey League for the Boston Bruins during the 1966–67 season. Hodgson also played 107 games in the World Hockey Association with the Cleveland Crusaders and Los Angeles Sharks between 1972 and 1974. The rest of his career, which lasted from 1965 to 1977, was spent in various minor leagues.

Hodgson was born in Maskwacis, Alberta. He moved to England in 1996, and married Margret Julianne, who was originally from France.

== Career statistics ==
=== Regular season and playoffs ===
			Regular season					Playoffs
Season	Team	League	GP	G	A	Pts	PIM	GP	G	A	Pts	PIM
1963–64	Estevan Bruins	SJHL	60	19	17	36	123	11	4	4	8	32
1964–65	Estevan Bruins	SJHL	55	37	38	75	148	6	3	4	7	20
1964–65	Minneapolis Bruins	CHL	2	0	0	0	2	5	0	0	0	0
1965–66	Estevan Bruins	SJHL	35	21	35	56	152	11	2	7	9	28
1965–66	Estevan Bruins	M-Cup	—	—	—	—	—	13	4	7	11	22
1965–66	Edmonton Oil Kings	M-Cup	—	—	—	—	—	6	2	3	5	9
1966–67	Boston Bruins	NHL	4	0	0	0	0	—	—	—	—	—
1966–67	Buffalo Bisons	AHL	7	2	2	4	16	—	—	—	—	—
1966–67	Oklahoma City Blazers	CHL	53	5	7	12	101	9	2	1	3	10
1967–68	Oklahoma City Blazers	CHL	62	11	10	21	136	7	0	1	1	15
1968–69	Oklahoma City Blazers	CHL	44	12	20	32	56	12	0	1	1	25
1969–70	Salt Lake Golden Eagles	WHL	57	18	22	40	54	—	—	—	—	—
1970–71	Salt Lake Golden Eagles	WHL	60	8	13	21	90	—	—	—	—	—
1971–72	Salt Lake Golden Eagles	WHL	72	22	17	39	86	—	—	—	—	—
1972–73	Cleveland Crusaders	WHA	74	15	23	38	93	9	1	3	4	13
1973–74	Cleveland Crusaders	WHA	10	0	2	2	6	—	—	—	—	—
1973–74	Jacksonville Barons	AHL	46	4	13	17	42	—	—	—	—	—
1973–74	Los Angeles Sharks	WHA	23	3	9	12	22	—	—	—	—	—
1974–75	Philadelphia Firebirds	NAHL	71	10	26	36	39	3	0	1	1	4
1975–76	Roanoke Valley Rebels	SHL	51	11	14	25	32	6	1	3	4	2
1976–77	Oklahoma City Blazers	CHL	46	5	23	28	83	—	—	—	—	—
WHA totals			107	18	34	52	121	9	1	3	4	13
NHL totals			4	0	0	0	0	—	—	—	—	—
