= Jean-Paul LeBlanc (ice hockey) =

Canadian ice hockey player

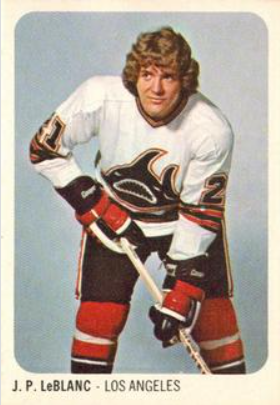
- LeBlanc in 1973 card
- Born: October 20, 1946 (age 79) South Durham, Quebec, Canada
- Height: 5 ft 10 in (178 cm)
- Weight: 170 lb (77 kg; 12 st 2 lb)
- Position: Centre
- Shot: Left
- Played for: Chicago Black Hawks; Los Angeles Sharks; Michigan Stags/Baltimore Blades; Denver Spurs/Ottawa Civics; Detroit Red Wings
- Playing career: 1966–1981

Jean-Paul LeBlanc (born October 20, 1946) is a Canadian retired professional ice hockey centre.

== Career ==
LeBlanc played 153 games in the National Hockey League and 248 games in the World Hockey Association between 1969 and 1979. During his career, he was a member of the Chicago Black Hawks, Los Angeles Sharks, Michigan Stags, Baltimore Blades, Denver Spurs, Ottawa Civics and Detroit Red Wings.

== Career statistics ==
=== Regular season and playoffs ===
			Regular season					Playoffs
Season	Team	League	GP	G	A	Pts	PIM	GP	G	A	Pts	PIM
1965–66	St. Catharines Black Hawks	OHA	22	9	15	24	6	—	—	—	—	—
1965–66	Shawinigan Bruins	QJAHL	26	13	13	26	30	—	—	—	—	—
1966–67	St. Catharines Black Hawks	OHA	48	18	26	44	73	6	1	1	2	23
1966–67	St. Louis Braves	CHL	1	0	0	0	0	—	—	—	—	—
1966–67	Columbus Checkers	IHL	2	1	0	1	2	—	—	—	—	—
1967–68	Dallas Black Hawks	CHL	66	19	31	50	83	5	1	0	1	2
1968–69	Dallas Black Hawks	CHL	67	18	34	52	82	11	2	5	7	35
1968–69	Chicago Black Hawks	NHL	6	1	2	3	0	—	—	—	—	—
1969–70	Dallas Black Hawks	CHL	68	28	35	63	138	—	—	—	—	—
1969–70	Portland Buckaroos	WHL	—	—	—	—	—	11	0	4	4	22
1970–71	Dallas Black Hawks	CHL	57	13	31	44	61	9	3	5	8	7
1971–72	Dallas Black Hawks	CHL	70	22	68	90	117	12	6	7	13	21
1972–73	Los Angeles Sharks	WHA	77	19	50	69	49	6	0	5	5	2
1973–74	Los Angeles Sharks	WHA	78	20	46	66	58	—	—	—	—	—
1974–75	Michigan Stags/Baltimore Blades	WHA	78	16	33	49	100	—	—	—	—	—
1975–76	Denver Spurs/Ottawa Civics	WHA	15	1	5	6	25	—	—	—	—	—
1975–76	Detroit Red Wings	NHL	46	4	9	13	39	—	—	—	—	—
1976–77	Detroit Red Wings	NHL	74	7	11	18	40	—	—	—	—	—
1977–78	Kansas City Red Wings	CHL	65	20	35	55	42	—	—	—	—	—
1977–78	Detroit Red Wings	NHL	3	0	2	2	4	2	0	0	0	0
1978–79	Kansas City Red Wings	CHL	53	20	33	53	72	4	0	0	0	0
1978–79	Detroit Red Wings	NHL	24	2	6	8	4	—	—	—	—	—
1979–80	Adirondack Red Wings	AHL	75	16	42	58	69	4	1	1	2	2
1980–81	Adirondack Red Wings	AHL	77	12	36	48	106	17	5	7	12	27
WHA totals			248	56	134	190	232	6	0	5	5	2
NHL totals			153	14	30	44	87	2	0	0	0	0
