= Alton White =

Canadian ice hockey player

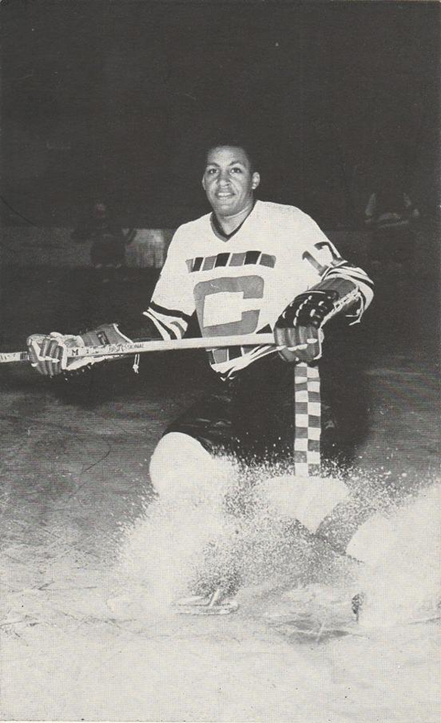
- White in 1966 card for Columbus Checkers of the IHL
- Born: May 31, 1945 (age 81) Amherst, Nova Scotia, Canada
- Height: 5 ft 9 in (175 cm)
- Weight: 175 lb (79 kg; 12 st 7 lb)
- Position: Right wing/Centre
- Shot: Right
- Played for: New York Raiders; Los Angeles Sharks; Michigan Stags/Baltimore Blades
- Playing career: 1965–1975

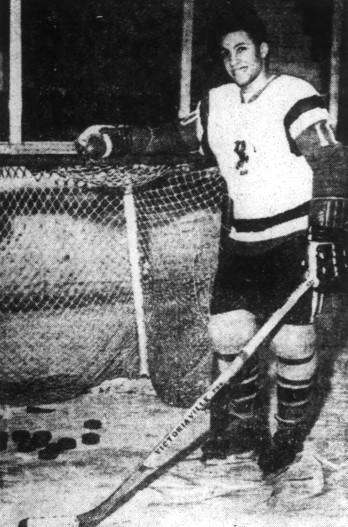
White, circa 1970

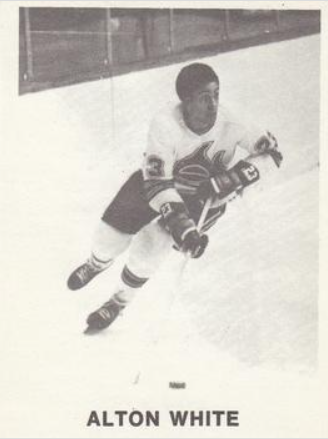
1972-73 Alton White photo for Los Angeles Sharks

Alton White (born May 31, 1945) is a Canadian former professional ice hockey player. He played three seasons in the World Hockey Association with the New York Raiders, Los Angeles Sharks, and the Michigan Stags/Baltimore Blades.

Born in Amherst, Nova Scotia, White is best known for being the second player of African descent, after Willie O'Ree, to have played on a professional major league ice hockey team and for being the first hockey player of African descent to score 20 goals in a single season for a major league team. He scored 20 goals and 21 assists for the Los Angeles Sharks during the 1972–73 season. During the same 1972–73 season, he became the first black player in history to score a hat-trick in a major league professional game, doing so on January 10, 1973 against the Chicago Cougars. A leg injury, combined with the needs to support his growing family with a more stable environment, prompted him to retire in 1975 at the age of 29 to join the family construction business in British Columbia.

== Career statistics ==
=== Regular season and playoffs ===
			Regular season					Playoffs
Season	Team	League	GP	G	A	Pts	PIM	GP	G	A	Pts	PIM
1962–63	Winnipeg Rangers	MJHL	Statistics Unavailable
1963–64	Winnipeg Rangers	MJHL	29	23	12	35	10	—	—	—	—	—
1963–64	St. Paul Rangers	CPHL	—	—	—	—	—	3	0	1	1	0
1965–66	Fort Wayne Komets	IHL	66	17	25	42	26	6	1	0	1	0
1966–67	Columbus Checkers	IHL	62	24	42	66	19	—	—	—	—	—
1967–68	Columbus Checkers	IHL	70	37	38	75	41	4	0	3	3	0
1968–69	Providence Reds	AHL	7	1	0	1	2	9	1	0	1	0
1968–69	Columbus Checkers	IHL	72	35	50	85	8	3	2	2	4	0
1969–70	Providence Reds	AHL	67	24	24	48	14	—	—	—	—	—
1970–71	Providence Reds	AHL	68	29	32	61	25	9	3	4	7	2
1971–72	Providence Reds	AHL	76	30	34	64	18	5	0	0	0	0
1972–73	New York Raiders	WHA	13	1	4	5	2	—	—	—	—	—
1972–73	Los Angeles Sharks	WHA	57	20	17	37	22	6	1	0	1	0
1973–74	Los Angeles Sharks	WHA	48	8	13	21	13	—	—	—	—	—
1973–74	Greensboro Generals	SHL	8	1	4	5	4	—	—	—	—	—
1974–75	Syracuse Blazers	NAHL	46	26	29	55	36	—	—	—	—	—
1974–75	Michigan Stags/Baltimore Blades	WHA	27	9	12	21	8	—	—	—	—	—
WHA totals			145	38	46	84	45	6	1	0	1	0
