= Gary Veneruzzo =

Canadian ice hockey player

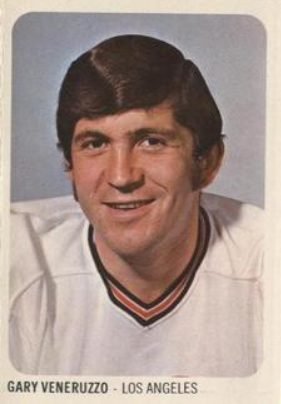
- Veneruzzo in 1973 card
- Born: June 28, 1943 (age 82) Fort William, Ontario, Canada
- Height: 5 ft 8 in (173 cm)
- Weight: 165 lb (75 kg; 11 st 11 lb)
- Position: Left Wing
- Shot: Left
- Played for: St. Louis Blues; Los Angeles Sharks; Michigan Stags/Baltimore Blades; Cincinnati Stingers; Phoenix Roadrunners; San Diego Mariners
- Playing career: 1962–1977

Gary Raymond Veneruzzo (born June 28, 1943) is a Canadian former professional ice hockey player. He played seven games in the National Hockey League (NHL) with the St. Louis Blues during the 1967–68 and 1971–72 seasons, and 348 games in the World Hockey Association (WHA) with the Los Angeles Sharks, Michigan Stags/Baltimore Blades, Cincinnati Stingers, Phoenix Roadrunners, and San Diego Mariners from 1972 to 1977. Veneruzzo was born in Fort William, Ontario.

== Playing career ==
Veneruzzo was a minor league player playing in the Toronto Maple Leafs system for the Tulsa Oilers in the Central Professional Hockey League when the NHL expanded in 1967. He was selected in the 19th round of the 1967 NHL Expansion Draft by the St. Louis Blues. Veneruzzo initially did not make the NHL roster and was farmed out to their affiliate in the Central Professional League, the Kansas City Blues, where he led the team in scoring and earned a brief call-up to the NHL team. He scored a goal and an assist in five NHL regular appearances and appeared in nine Stanley Cup games, where he was credited with two assists. The following two years, Veneruzzo was in the minors despite having decent statistics. He was called up in 1972 for two games with the Blues, where he was held scoreless.

Veneruzzo jumped to the WHA for its inaugural season in 1972-73, signing with the Los Angeles Sharks. He led the Sharks in scoring that season with 43 goals and 30 assists, and the following year was second on the team, behind Marc Tardif with 39 goals and 29 assists. The Sharks moved to Michigan in 1974 and then, midway through the season, to Baltimore, and Veneruzzo again led the team in scoring with 33 goals and 27 assists. He started the following year with the Cincinnati Stingers before being traded to Phoenix. Veneruzzo played one more year in the WHA, closing his career with the San Diego Mariners in 1976-77.

Altogether, Veneruzzo ranked 56th overall in all-time scoring in the WHA, having played 348 games in the WHA, scoring 151 goals, 123 assists, and 274 points, coupled with 212 penalty minutes in regular season games, and five goals, no assists, and 11 penalty minutes in 18 playoff appearances.

He was inducted into the Northwestern Ontario Sports Hall of Fame in 2000.

== Career statistics ==
=== Regular season and playoffs ===
			Regular season					Playoffs
Season	Team	League	GP	G	A	Pts	PIM	GP	G	A	Pts	PIM
1959–60	Fort William Canadiens	TBJHL	—	—	—	—	—	—	—	—	—	—
1959–60	Fort William Canadiens	M-Cup	—	—	—	—	—	2	0	0	0	0
1960–61	Fort William Canadiens	TBJHL	24	6	13	19	18	4	0	6	6	11
1960–61	Fort William Canadiens	M-Cup	—	—	—	—	—	7	1	5	6	2
1961–62	Fort William Canadiens	TBJHL	30	30	31	61	76	—	—	—	—	—
1961–62	Port Arthur North Stars	M-Cup	—	—	—	—	—	4	2	3	5	6
1962–63	Fort William Beavers	TBSHL	26	27	20	47	27	14	11	15	26	25
1962–63	Fort William Canadiens	M-Cup	—	—	—	—	—	10	8	10	18	19
1963–64	Fort William Beavers	TBSHL	30	26	35	61	35	10	7	6	13	4
1964–65	Tulsa Oilers	CHL	60	11	17	28	29	10	1	4	5	8
1965–66	Tulsa Oilers	CHL	69	19	19	38	25	11	1	7	8	5
1966–67	Tulsa Oilers	CHL	59	21	25	46	38	—	—	—	—	—
1966–67	Victoria Maple Leafs	WHL	11	3	5	8	2	—	—	—	—	—
1967–68	St. Louis Blues	NHL	5	1	1	2	0	9	0	2	2	2
1967–68	Kansas City Blues	CHL	63	24	51	75	36	7	4	2	6	10
1968–69	Kansas City Blues	CHL	71	38	40	78	38	4	1	1	2	13
1969–70	Kansas City Blues	CHL	52	20	30	50	33	—	—	—	—	—
1969–70	Buffalo Bisons	AHL	21	8	11	19	2	14	6	5	11	9
1970–71	Kansas City Blues	CHL	2	2	0	2	2	—	—	—	—	—
1970–71	Seattle Totems	WHL	66	27	22	49	30	—	—	—	—	—
1971–72	St. Louis Blues	NHL	2	0	0	0	0	—	—	—	—	—
1971–72	Denver Spurs	WHL	72	41	45	86	41	9	2	6	8	10
1972–73	Los Angeles Sharks	WHA	78	43	30	73	34	6	3	0	3	4
1973–74	Los Angeles Sharks	WHA	78	39	29	68	68	—	—	—	—	—
1974–75	Michigan Stags/Baltimore Blades	WHA	77	33	27	60	57	—	—	—	—	—
1975–76	Cincinnati Stingers	WHA	14	3	2	5	8	—	—	—	—	—
1975–76	Phoenix Roadrunners	WHA	61	19	24	43	27	5	2	0	2	7
1976–77	San Diego Mariners	WHA	40	14	11	25	18	7	0	0	0	0
1977–78	Thunder Bay Twins	OHA Sr	14	2	4	6	20	—	—	—	—	—
1978–79	Thunder Bay Twins	OHA Sr	40	22	25	47	—	—	—	—	—	—
WHA totals			348	151	123	274	212	18	5	0	5	11
NHL totals			7	1	1	2	0	9	0	2	2	2
