= Bill Young (ice hockey) =

Canadian ice hockey player

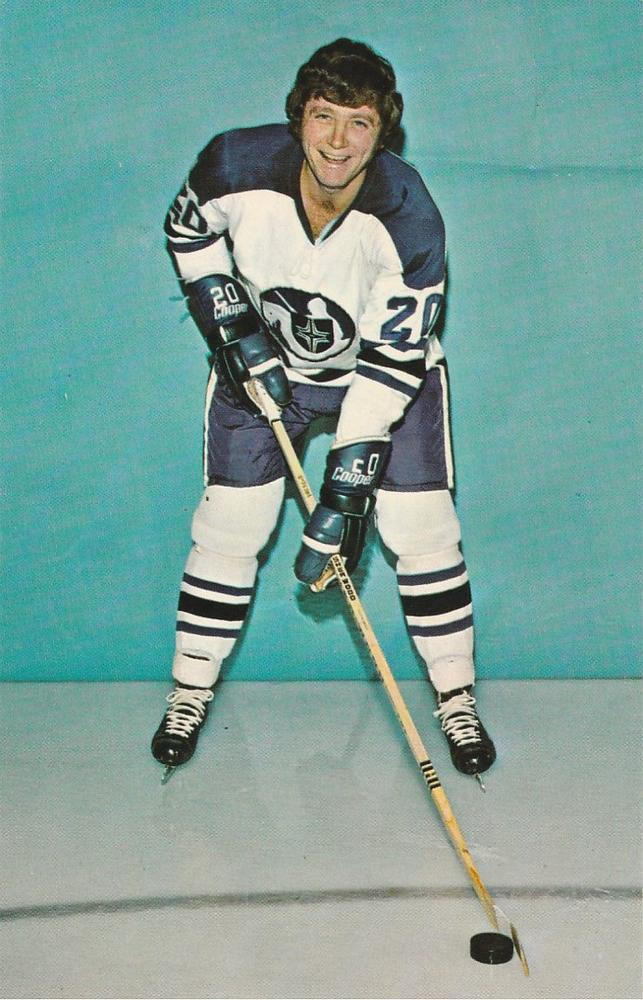
- Born: July 5, 1947 (age 78) St. Catharines, Ontario, Canada
- Height: 6 ft 1 in (185 cm)
- Weight: 194 lb (88 kg; 13 st 12 lb)
- Position: Left wing
- Shot: Left
- Played for: Los Angeles Sharks; Minnesota Fighting Saints; Cleveland Crusaders
- Playing career: 1967–1977

Bill Young (born July 5, 1947 in St. Catharines, Ontario) is a retired professional ice hockey player who played 142 games in the World Hockey Association. He played with the Los Angeles Sharks, Cleveland Crusaders, and Minnesota Fighting Saints.

== Career statistics ==
=== Regular season and playoffs ===
			Regular season					Playoffs
Season	Team	League	GP	G	A	Pts	PIM	GP	G	A	Pts	PIM
1962–63	St. Catharines Black Hawks	OHA	1	0	0	0	0	—	—	—	—	—
1963–64	St. Catharines Black Hawks	OHA	3	0	0	0	0	—	—	—	—	—
1964–65	St. Catharines Black Hawks	OHA	10	1	0	1	0	—	—	—	—	—
1964–65	Etobicoke Indians	MJBHL	Statistics Unavailable
1966–67	St. Catharines Black Hawks	OHA	32	10	20	30	32	—	—	—	—	—
1967–68	Greensboro Generals	EHL	72	37	59	96	28	11	2	4	6	9
1968–69	Greensboro Generals	EHL	72	39	49	88	60	8	0	7	7	6
1969–70	Greensboro Generals	EHL	20	12	19	31	22	—	—	—	—	—
1969–70	Dallas Black Hawks	CHL	42	10	22	32	8	—	—	—	—	—
1970–71	Dallas Black Hawks	CHL	62	19	31	50	83	10	0	8	8	14
1971–72	Dallas Black Hawks	CHL	49	11	14	25	41	9	1	1	2	16
1972–73	Los Angeles Sharks	WHA	50	14	12	26	46	—	—	—	—	—
1972–73	Minnesota Fighting Saints	WHA	23	5	6	11	20	6	2	2	4	4
1973–74	Los Angeles Sharks	WHA	16	1	3	4	4	—	—	—	—	—
1973–74	Cleveland Crusaders	WHA	53	8	9	17	70	—	—	—	—	—
1976–77	Winston–Salem Polar Twins	SHL	28	2	6	8	24	—	—	—	—	—
WHA totals			142	28	30	58	140	6	2	2	4	4
