= Bill Horton (ice hockey) =

Canadian ice hockey player

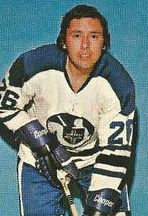
- Horton in 1972–73
- Born: September 5, 1946 Lindsay, Ontario, Canada
- Died: May 24, 1988 (aged 41) Utica, New York
- Height: 6 ft 0 in (183 cm)
- Weight: 194 lb (88 kg; 13 st 12 lb)
- Position: Defence
- Shot: Left
- Played for: WHA; Cleveland Crusaders; Los Angeles Sharks; Indianapolis Racers
- Playing career: 1967–1982

William Harley "Bill" Horton (September 5, 1946 – May 24, 1988) was a Canadian professional ice hockey defenceman.

== Career ==
Horton played 193 games in the World Hockey Association for the Cleveland Crusaders, Los Angeles Sharks, and Indianapolis Racers.

== Career statistics ==
=== Regular season and playoffs ===
			Regular season					Playoffs
Season	Team	League	GP	G	A	Pts	PIM	GP	G	A	Pts	PIM
1966–67	London Nationals	OHA	45	1	8	9	75	—	—	—	—	—
1967–68	Syracuse Blazers	EHL	17	1	8	9	30	—	—	—	—	—
1967–68	Dayton Gems	IHL	51	4	14	18	76	11	0	2	2	8
1968–69	Dayton–Port Huron	IHL	69	8	16	24	79	3	0	0	0	2
1969–70	Flint Generals	IHL	68	3	24	27	118	—	—	—	—	—
1970–71	Flint Generals	IHL	69	3	19	22	81	7	0	0	0	12
1971–72	Flint Generals	IHL	69	4	25	29	116	4	0	1	1	4
1972–73	Cleveland Crusaders	WHA	74	2	17	19	55	9	0	1	1	10
1973–74	Los Angeles Sharks	WHA	60	0	9	9	46	—	—	—	—	—
1974–75	Indianapolis Racers	WHA	59	2	9	11	30	—	—	—	—	—
1974–75	Greensboro Generals	SHL	8	2	0	2	2	—	—	—	—	—
1975–76	Mohawk Valley Comets	NAHL	10	0	2	2	13	—	—	—	—	—
1976–77	Mohawk Valley Comets	NAHL	66	4	18	22	42	5	2	0	2	23
1977–78	Long Beach Sharks/Rockets	PHL	40	7	15	22	62	—	—	—	—	—
1978–79	San Diego Hawks	PHL	19	0	7	7	20	—	—	—	—	—
1978–79	Los Angeles Blades	PHL	6	1	3	4	6	—	—	—	—	—
1979–80	Utica Mohawks	EHL	33	1	3	4	26	—	—	—	—	—
1980–81	Syracuse Hornets	EHL	3	0	1	1	28	—	—	—	—	—
1981–82	Mohawk Valley Stars	ACHL	3	0	1	1	43	—	—	—	—	—
WHA totals			193	4	35	39	131	9	0	1	1	10
