= Tom Serviss =

Canadian ice hockey player

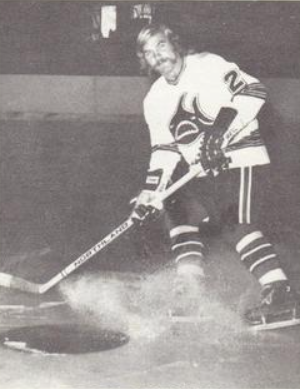
- Serviss in 1972 photo
- Born: May 25, 1948 (age 78) Moose Jaw, Saskatchewan, Canada
- Height: 5 ft 10 in (178 cm)
- Weight: 185 lb (84 kg; 13 st 3 lb)
- Position: Right wing
- Shot: Left
- Played for: Los Angeles Sharks; Michigan Stags; Baltimore Blades; Quebec Nordiques; Calgary Cowboys
- Playing career: 1964–1978

Thomas Hugh Serviss (born May 25, 1948) is a retired professional ice hockey player who played 286 games in the World Hockey Association. He played for the Dallas Blackhawks CHL, Rochester Americans AHL, Flint General IHL. Los Angeles Sharks, Michigan Stags, Baltimore Blades, Quebec Nordiques, and Calgary CowboysOklahoma City CHL.

== Career statistics ==
=== Regular season and playoffs ===
			Regular season					Playoffs
Season	Team	League	GP	G	A	Pts	PIM	GP	G	A	Pts	PIM
1964–65	Moose Jaw Canucks	SJHL	Statistics Unavailable
1967–68	Penticton Broncos	BCJHL	Statistics Unavailable
1967–68	Vernon Essos	BCJHL	––	25	65	90	0	—	—	—	—	—
1968–69	Calgary Centennials	WCHL	60	24	79	103	60	—	—	—	—	—
1969–70	Dallas Black Hawks	CHL	63	1	20	21	48	—	—	—	—	—
1970–71	Dallas Black Hawks	CHL	30	1	12	13	50	—	—	—	—	—
1970–71	Rochester Americans	AHL	9	0	0	0	2	—	—	—	—	—
1971–72	Flint Generals	IHL	71	21	43	64	65	4	0	1	1	2
1972–73	Greensboro Generals	EHL	2	2	1	3	2	—	—	—	—	—
1972–73	Los Angeles Sharks	WHA	73	11	26	37	32	6	0	0	0	0
1973–74	Los Angeles Sharks	WHA	74	6	15	21	37	—	—	—	—	—
1974–75	Greensboro Generals	SHL	10	1	9	10	6	—	—	—	—	—
1974–75	Michigan Stags/Baltimore Blades	WHA	60	12	17	29	18	—	—	—	—	—
1975–76	Quebec Nordiques	WHA	71	7	19	26	12	5	0	0	0	0
1976–77	Tidewater Sharks	SHL	34	14	32	46	44	—	—	—	—	—
1976–77	Calgary Cowboys	WHA	8	2	1	3	2	—	—	—	—	—
1976–77	Oklahoma City Blazers	CHL	6	0	6	6	6	—	—	—	—	—
1977–78	Lukko Rauma	SM–liiga	36	6	16	22	46	—	—	—	—	—
WHA totals			286	38	78	116	101	11	0	0	0	0
