= Los Angeles Sharks =

Former ice hockey team of the World Hockey Association

- City: Los Angeles, California
- League: World Hockey Association (WHA)
- Operated: 1972–1974
- Home arena: L.A. Sports Arena; Long Beach Sports Arena
- Colors: Red, black
- Media: KTTV; KNX

Franchise history
- 1972–1974: Los Angeles Sharks
- 1974–1975 (to 18 January): Michigan Stags
- 1975 (remainder of season): Baltimore Blades

The Los Angeles Sharks were an ice hockey team that played in the World Hockey Association (WHA) from 1972 to 1974. Their primary home arena was the Los Angeles Memorial Sports Arena but they sometimes played at the Long Beach Sports Arena when the Sports Arena had other contractual obligations. After the 1973–74 season, the franchise moved to Detroit to become the Michigan Stags and again mid-season to Baltimore to become the Baltimore Blades.

The franchise was originally meant to be called the Los Angeles Aces, but took the "Sharks" name after the proposed San Francisco Sharks franchise (not to be confused with the current NHL San Jose Sharks) was transferred to Quebec and became the Nordiques before the WHA began play. They kept the original colors from the name Aces; red and black being the colors of the suits in a deck of cards.

== History ==
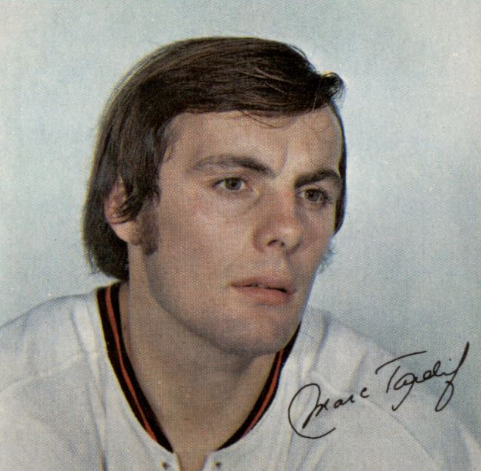
Marc Tardif, offered a long-term, no-trade, no-cut contract, signed with the Sharks in 1973. The Sharks would meet their demise in 1974 but Tardif thrived elsewhere, scoring 316 goals in the WHA.

=== 1972–73 Season ===
The Sharks' first season was moderately successful on and off the ice as they finished 3rd in the Western Division (losing in the first round of the playoffs to the Houston Aeros in six games) and attendance was respectable. Gary Veneruzzo led the team with 43 goals. Alton White became the second player of African descent (after Willie O'Ree) to play on a professional major league ice hockey team when he played with the Sharks that season. He scored 20 goals to become the first hockey player of African descent to score 20 goals in a single season. He also became the first black player in history to score a hat-trick in a major league professional game, doing so on January 10, 1973 against the Chicago Cougars.

The Sharks made up for lack of offensive depth with solid defense and goaltending as they allowed the 3rd fewest goals in the league. The Sharks were also a physical team and led the WHA in penalty minutes. However, their penalty killing was among the league's best.

=== 1973–74 Season ===
The Sharks could not capitalize on their successful first season and sank to last place in their second year. They had the league's worst record, scored the fewest goals, and allowed the second most goals. This drop off coincided with a resurgence across town by the NHL's Los Angeles Kings, who qualified for the playoffs in the 1973–74 season for the first time in five years. Thus, attendance dropped considerably, and after season's end it was announced that the Sharks would relocate to Detroit and become the Michigan Stags. The 1973–74 Sharks are notable for one thing - they were the first team (NHL or WHA) to go an entire season without playing a single tie game. (Note that WHA rules provided for a 10-minute sudden death overtime; if no team scored after 10 minutes, the game was a tie. This resulted in much fewer tie games than in the NHL but even so, the Sharks were the only team to go an entire season with 0 ties).

The last active Sharks player in major professional hockey was Marc Tardif who retired after the 1982–83 NHL season. The last active former Shark was Kirk Bowman who played in Switzerland until 1988.

== Season-by-season record ==
Note: GP = Games played, W = Wins, L = Losses, T = Ties, Pts = Points, GF = Goals for, GA = Goals against, PIM = Penalties in minutes

Season	GP	W	L	T	Pts	GF	GA	PIM	Finish	Playoffs
1972–73	78	37	35	6	80	259	250	1477	3rd, Western	Lost Quarterfinals 4–2 (Aeros)
1973–74	78	25	53	0	50	239	339	1086	6th, Western	Did not qualify
Totals	156	62	88	6	130	498	589	2563

== Name reused in new league ==
Three years after the WHA Sharks left for Michigan, founding owner Dennis Murphy along with Walt Marlow (and later James Browitt), created the Long Beach Sharks to play in the Long Beach Sports Arena (former home of the Los Angeles Sharks) in the new Pacific Hockey League, a west coast based minor professional hockey league in 1977. The Sharks even revived the uniforms and logo worn by their WHA predecessors. The Sharks would finish in fourth and last place with a 15-27-0 record. For the second season of the league in 1978/79, the Sharks moved into the Los Angeles Memorial Sports Arena and were renamed the Los Angeles Blades before folding mid season.

== See also ==
- List of Los Angeles Sharks players
