= 1972–73 Minnesota Fighting Saints season =

World Hockey Association team season

1972–73 Minnesota Fighting Saints
- Division: 4th Western
- 1972–73 record: 38–37–3
- Home record: 24–14–1
- Road record: 14–23–2
- Goals for: 250
- Goals against: 269

Team information
- General manager: Glen Sonmor
- Coach: Glen Sonmor (28–28–3); Harry Neale (10–9–0)
- Captain: Ted Hampson
- Alternate captains: Wayne Connelly; John Arbour; Mike McMahon
- Arena: St. Paul Auditorium (20 games); St. Paul Civic Center (19 games)
- Average attendance: 5,855 (48.9%)

Team leaders
- Goals: Wayne Connelly (40)
- Assists: Ted Hampson (45)
- Points: Wayne Connelly (70)
- Penalty minutes: Dick Paradise (189)
- Wins: Mike Curran (23)
- Goals against average: Mike Curran (3.09)

The 1972–73 Minnesota Fighting Saints season was their first season of operation in the newly created World Hockey Association (WHA).

== Regular season ==
=== Final standings ===
Western Division
	GP	W	L	T	GF	GA	PIM	Pts
Winnipeg Jets	78	43	31	4	285	249	757	90
Houston Aeros	78	39	35	4	284	269	1363	82
Los Angeles Sharks	78	37	35	6	259	250	1477	80
Minnesota Fighting Saints	78	38	37	3	250	269	843	79
Alberta Oilers	78	38	37	3	269	256	1134	79
Chicago Cougars	78	26	50	2	245	295	811	54

== Schedule and results ==
1972–73 regular season
October

Game	Result	Date	Score	Opponent	Record
1	L	October 13, 1972	3–4	Winnipeg Jets (1972–73)	0–1–0
2	W	October 15, 1972	3–2	Chicago Cougars (1972–73)	1–1–0
3	L	October 17, 1972	1–5	Los Angeles Sharks (1972–73)	1–2–0
4	L	October 19, 1972	1–5	@ Houston Aeros (1972–73)	1–3–0
5	T	October 20, 1972	1–1	@ Winnipeg Jets (1972–73)	1–3–1
6	W	October 22, 1972	5–4	@ New York Raiders (1972–73)	2–3–1
7	L	October 23, 1972	1–5	@ New England Whalers (1972–73)	2–4–1
8	L	October 26, 1972	4–5	@ Quebec Nordiques (1972–73)	2–5–1

November

Game	Result	Date	Score	Opponent	Record
9	W	November 1, 1972	3–0	Winnipeg Jets (1972–73)	3–5–1
10	L	November 2, 1972	2–4	New York Raiders (1972–73)	3–6–1
11	W	November 5, 1972	3–1	Philadelphia Blazers (1972–73)	4–6–1
12	W	November 10, 1972	5–1	@ Winnipeg Jets (1972–73)	5–6–1
13	W	November 14, 1972	5–3	Cleveland Crusaders (1972–73)	6–6–1
14	W	November 16, 1972	5–4	Quebec Nordiques (1972–73)	7–6–1
15	W	November 18, 1972	5–4 OT	@ Philadelphia Blazers (1972–73)	8–6–1
16	L	November 19, 1972	3–4	Chicago Cougars (1972–73)	8–7–1
17	W	November 21, 1972	4–3 OT	Alberta Oilers (1972–73)	9–7–1
18	W	November 23, 1972	4–3	Los Angeles Sharks (1972–73)	10–7–1
19	W	November 24, 1972	6–4	@ Philadelphia Blazers (1972–73)	11–7–1
20	W	November 26, 1972	3–1	New England Whalers (1972–73)	12–7–1
21	L	November 28, 1972	2–3 OT	@ Ottawa Nationals (1972–73)	12–8–1
22	L	November 30, 1972	2–5	@ New York Raiders (1972–73)	12–9–1

December

Game	Result	Date	Score	Opponent	Record
23	W	December 1, 1972	6–4	@ Alberta Oilers (1972–73)	13–9–1
24	L	December 3, 1972	1–5	@ Winnipeg Jets (1972–73)	13–10–1
25	L	December 5, 1972	2–3 OT	Chicago Cougars (1972–73)	13–11–1
26	W	December 7, 1972	3–0	Houston Aeros (1972–73)	14–11–1
27	L	December 8, 1972	3–4 OT	@ Chicago Cougars (1972–73)	14–12–1
28	W	December 10, 1972	4–3 OT	Cleveland Crusaders (1972–73)	15–12–1
29	T	December 12, 1972	3–3	@ Los Angeles Sharks (1972–73)	15–12–2
30	W	December 14, 1972	6–3	@ Chicago Cougars (1972–73)	16–12–2
31	L	December 15, 1972	2–3	Houston Aeros (1972–73)	16–13–2
32	W	December 17, 1972	4–2	Chicago Cougars (1972–73)	17–13–2
33	W	December 19, 1972	7–5	New England Whalers (1972–73)	18–13–2
34	W	December 21, 1972	3–0	Winnipeg Jets (1972–73)	19–13–2
35	L	December 23, 1972	1–3	@ Cleveland Crusaders (1972–73)	19–14–2
36	L	December 26, 1972	2–6	Philadelphia Blazers (1972–73)	19–15–2
37	W	December 28, 1972	4–2	@ Los Angeles Sharks (1972–73)	20–15–2
38	L	December 29, 1972	2–5	@ Los Angeles Sharks (1972–73)	20–16–2

January

Game	Result	Date	Score	Opponent	Record
39	T	January 1, 1973	4–4	Houston Aeros (1972–73)	20–16–3
40	L	January 7, 1973	2–6	Winnipeg Jets (1972–73)	20–17–3
41	L	January 9, 1973	3–4 OT	Los Angeles Sharks (1972–73)	20–18–3
42	L	January 11, 1973	3–4	Cleveland Crusaders (1972–73)	20–19–3
43	W	January 12, 1973	3–2	Quebec Nordiques (1972–73)	21–19–3
44	W	January 14, 1973	3–2 OT	Ottawa Nationals (1972–73)	22–19–3
45	L	January 16, 1973	1–3	@ Winnipeg Jets (1972–73)	22–20–3
46	L	January 18, 1973	3–6	@ Ottawa Nationals (1972–73)	22–21–3
47	W	January 20, 1973	10–5	@ Quebec Nordiques (1972–73)	23–21–3
48	W	January 22, 1973	3–2	@ New York Raiders (1972–73)	24–21–3
49	L	January 25, 1973	2–5	Houston Aeros (1972–73)	24–22–3
50	W	January 26, 1973	4–2	Ottawa Nationals (1972–73)	25–22–3
51	L	January 30, 1973	2–4	@ Chicago Cougars (1972–73)	25–23–3

February

Game	Result	Date	Score	Opponent	Record
52	L	February 1, 1973	2–4	@ Quebec Nordiques (1972–73)	25–24–3
53	L	February 3, 1973	1–7	@ Houston Aeros (1972–73)	25–25–3
54	W	February 5, 1973	6–3	@ Houston Aeros (1972–73)	26–25–3
55	W	February 6, 1973	5–4	New York Raiders (1972–73)	27–25–3
56	L	February 8, 1973	1–3	@ Los Angeles Sharks (1972–73)	27–26–3
57	L	February 9, 1973	0–6	@ Alberta Oilers (1972–73)	27–27–3
58	L	February 11, 1973	5–7	@ Alberta Oilers (1972–73)	27–28–3
59	W	February 15, 1973	3–0	Ottawa Nationals (1972–73)	28–28–3
60	W	February 17, 1973	7–3	@ Cleveland Crusaders (1972–73)	29–28–3
61	W	February 18, 1973	7–5	Chicago Cougars (1972–73)	30–28–3
62	L	February 25, 1973	1–4	@ Houston Aeros (1972–73)	30–29–3
63	W	February 27, 1973	3–0	Philadelphia Blazers (1972–73)	31–29–3

March

Game	Result	Date	Score	Opponent	Record
64	L	March 1, 1973	1–4	Los Angeles Sharks (1972–73)	31–30–3
65	W	March 4, 1973	4–2	New England Whalers (1972–73)	32–30–3
66	W	March 6, 1973	4–3 OT	Alberta Oilers (1972–73)	33–30–3
67	L	March 8, 1973	1–2	@ Philadelphia Blazers (1972–73)	33–31–3
68	L	March 10, 1973	1–3	@ New England Whalers (1972–73)	33–32–3
69	W	March 11, 1973	2–1	Alberta Oilers (1972–73)	34–32–3
70	W	March 15, 1973	7–4	@ Chicago Cougars (1972–73)	35–32–3
71	L	March 16, 1973	4–7	@ New England Whalers (1972–73)	35–33–3
72	L	March 20, 1973	3–5	@ Alberta Oilers (1972–73)	35–34–3
73	W	March 22, 1973	2–1 OT	@ Chicago Cougars (1972–73)	36–34–3
74	W	March 24, 1973	2–1 OT	@ Cleveland Crusaders (1972–73)	37–34–3
75	L	March 25, 1973	1–6	@ Ottawa Nationals (1972–73)	37–35–3
76	W	March 27, 1973	4–3	New York Raiders (1972–73)	38–35–3
77	L	March 29, 1973	3–5	Quebec Nordiques (1972–73)	38–36–3
78	L	March 30, 1973	3–5	Alberta Oilers (1972–73)	38–37–3

Legend: Win (2 points) Loss (0 points) Tie (1 point)

== Playoffs ==
The Oilers and the Minnesota Fighting Saints were tied at the end of the season. They had the same number of victories and points, and they had both won four games against each other. Subsequently, it was decided that the two teams would play a one game playoff to decide the final spot in the playoffs, to be played in Calgary.

1973 Avco Cup playoffs
Preliminary round vs. Alberta Oilers – Fighting Saints win 1–0

Game	Date	Visitor	Score	Home	Series
1	April 4	Minnesota Fighting Saints	4–2	Alberta Oilers	1–0

Quarterfinals vs. Winnipeg Jets – Jets win 4–1

Game	Date	Visitor	Score	Home	Series
1	April 6	Minnesota Fighting Saints	1–3	Winnipeg Jets	0–1
2	April 8	Minnesota Fighting Saints	2–5	Winnipeg Jets	0–2
3	April 10	Winnipeg Jets	4–6	Minnesota Fighting Saints	1–2
4	April 11	Winnipeg Jets	3–2 OT	Minnesota Fighting Saints	1–3
5	April 15	Minnesota Fighting Saints	5–8	Winnipeg Jets	1–4

Legend: Win Loss

== Player statistics ==
=== Skaters ===
Regular season
Player	Position	GP	G	A	Pts	PIM	+/-	PPG	SHG	GWG
Wayne Connelly	C	78	40	30	70	16	0	10	0	6
Ted Hampson	C	77	17	45	62	20	0	4	0	2
Bill Klatt	RW	78	36	22	58	22	0	12	0	5
Mike McMahon	D	75	12	39	51	87	0	4	0	0
Keith Christiansen	C	64	12	30	42	24	0	2	0	0
George Morrison	LW	70	16	24	40	20	0	9	0	0
Bob MacMillan	RW	75	13	27	40	48	0	1	0	0
Terry Ball	D	78	6	34	40	66	0	1	0	0
Mike Antonovich	C	75	20	19	39	46	0	1	0	0
John Arbour	D	76	6	27	33	186	0	1	0	0
Fred Speck	C	47	13	16	29	52	0	5	0	0
Jim Johnson	C	33	9	14	23	12	0	0	0	0
Len Lilyholm	RW	77	8	13	21	37	0	0	0	0
Mel Pearson	LW	70	8	12	20	12	0	0	0	0
Terry Ryan	C	76	13	6	19	13	0	1	6	0
Dick Paradise	D	77	3	15	18	189	0	0	0	0
Frank Sanders	D	76	8	8	16	94	0	1	0	0
George Konik	D/LW	54	4	12	16	34	0	0	0	0
Bill Young	LW	23	5	6	11	20	0	2	0	0
Craig Falkman	RW	45	1	5	6	12	0	0	0	0
Mike Curran	G	43	0	1	1	26	0	0	0	0
Blaine Rydman	D	29	0	1	1	65	0	0	0	0
Jack McCartan	G	38	0	0	0	19	0	0	0	0
Carl Wetzel	G	1	0	0	0	0	0	0	0	0

Playoffs
Player	Position	GP	G	A	Pts	PIM	PPG	SHG	GWG
Mike McMahon	D	5	0	5	5	2	0	0	0
Ted Hampson	C	5	3	1	4	0	0	0	0
Wayne Connelly	C	5	1	3	4	0	0	0	0
Bill Klatt	RW	5	1	3	4	5	1	0	0
Jim Johnson	C	5	2	1	3	2	0	0	0
Terry Ball	D	5	1	2	3	4	1	0	0
Bob MacMillan	RW	5	0	3	3	0	0	0	0
Mike Antonovich	C	5	2	0	2	0	0	0	0
Mel Pearson	LW	5	2	0	2	0	0	0	0
George Morrison	LW	5	1	1	2	2	0	0	0
Bill Young	LW	5	1	1	2	4	0	0	1
Terry Ryan	C	5	0	2	2	0	0	0	0
Keith Christiansen	C	5	1	0	1	0	0	0	0
Len Lilyholm	RW	5	1	0	1	0	0	0	0
John Arbour	D	5	0	1	1	12	0	0	0
Jack McCartan	G	4	0	1	1	0	0	0	0
Dick Paradise	D	5	0	1	1	2	0	0	0
Frank Sanders	D	4	0	1	1	0	0	0	0
Mike Curran	G	2	0	0	0	0	0	0	0
Blaine Rydman	D	1	0	0	0	0	0	0	0

=== Goaltending ===
Regular season
Player	MIN	GP	W	L	T	GA	GAA	SO
Mike Curran	2540	43	23	17	2	131	3.09	4
Jack McCartan	2160	38	15	19	1	129	3.58	1
Carl Wetzel	60	1	0	1	0	3	3.00	0
Team:	4760	78	38	37	3	263	3.32	5

Playoffs
Player	MIN	GP	W	L	GA	GAA	SO
Jack McCartan	213	4	1	2	14	3.94	0
Mike Curran	90	2	0	2	9	6.00	0
Team:	303	5	1	4	23	4.55	0

Note: Pos = Position; GP = Games played; G = Goals; A = Assists; Pts = Points; +/- = plus/minus; PIM = Penalty minutes; PPG = Power-play goals; SHG = Short-handed goals; GWG = Game-winning goals
MIN = Minutes played; W = Wins; L = Losses; T = Ties; GA = Goals-against; GAA = Goals-against average; SO = Shutouts;

== See also ==
- 1972–73 WHA season
