= 1972–73 Houston Aeros season =

World Hockey Association team season

1972–73 Houston Aeros
- Division: 2nd Western
- 1972–73 record: 39–35–4
- Home record: 24–16–1
- Road record: 15–19–3
- Goals for: 284
- Goals against: 269

Team information
- General manager: James S. Smith
- Coach: Bill Dineen
- Captain: Ted Taylor
- Alternate captains: Poul Popiel; Gord Labossiere; Keke Mortson (unconfirmed)
- Arena: Sam Houston Coliseum
- Average attendance: 4,616 (49.6%)

Team leaders
- Goals: Gord Labossiere (36)
- Assists: Gord Labossiere (60)
- Points: Gord Labossiere (96)
- Penalty minutes: John Schella (239)
- Wins: Wayne Rutledge (21)
- Goals against average: Wayne Rutledge (2.96)

The 1972–73 Houston Aeros season was the Houston Aeros first season of operation in the newly created World Hockey Association (WHA).

== Regular season ==
=== Final standings ===
Western Division
	GP	W	L	T	GF	GA	PIM	Pts
Winnipeg Jets	78	43	31	4	285	249	757	90
Houston Aeros	78	39	35	4	284	269	1363	82
Los Angeles Sharks	78	37	35	6	259	250	1477	80
Minnesota Fighting Saints	78	38	37	3	250	269	843	79
Alberta Oilers	78	38	37	3	269	256	1134	79
Chicago Cougars	78	26	50	2	245	295	811	54

== Schedule and results ==
1972–73 regular season
October: 5–5–0, 10 points (home: 3–2–0; road: 2–3–0)

Game	Result	Date	Score	Opponent	Record
1	W	October 12, 1972	3–2	Chicago Cougars (1972–73)	1–0–0
2	W	October 13, 1972	3–2	@ Los Angeles Sharks (1972–73)	2–0–0
3	L	October 15, 1972	1–5	Los Angeles Sharks (1972–73)	2–1–0
4	L	October 18, 1972	1–4	New England Whalers (1972–73)	2–2–0
5	W	October 19, 1972	5–1	Minnesota Fighting Saints (1972–73)	3–2–0
6	L	October 21, 1972	2–3	@ New York Raiders (1972–73)	3–3–0
7	L	October 24, 1972	3–5	@ Quebec Nordiques (1972–73)	3–4–0
8	W	October 26, 1972	7–3	Ottawa Nationals (1972–73)	4–4–0
9	L	October 29, 1972	3–5	@ Winnipeg Jets (1972–73)	4–5–0
10	W	October 31, 1972	4–3	@ Alberta Oilers (1972–73)	5–5–0

November: 5–6–1, 10 points (home: 2–2–0; road: 3–4–1)

Game	Result	Date	Score	Opponent	Record
11	L	November 3, 1972	3–4	@ Alberta Oilers (1972–73)	5–6–0
12	L	November 5, 1972	0–4	@ Los Angeles Sharks (1972–73)	5–7–0
13	W	November 7, 1972	3–2	@ Chicago Cougars (1972–73)	6–7–0
14	L	November 11, 1972	1–3	@ Quebec Nordiques (1972–73)	6–8–0
15	T	November 13, 1972	4–4	@ New England Whalers (1972–73)	6–8–1
16	L	November 15, 1972	4–6	Los Angeles Sharks (1972–73)	6–9–1
17	W	November 19, 1972	4–2	Cleveland Crusaders (1972–73)	7–9–1
18	L	November 21, 1972	2–4	Winnipeg Jets (1972–73)	7–10–1
19	W	November 23, 1972	6–5 OT	Winnipeg Jets (1972–73)	8–10–1
20	W	November 25, 1972	3–1	@ Cleveland Crusaders (1972–73)	9–10–1
21	W	November 28, 1972	3–1	@ Cleveland Crusaders (1972–73)	10–10–1
22	L	November 30, 1972	3–6	@ Los Angeles Sharks (1972–73)	10–11–1

December: 6–6–2, 14 points (home: 3–2–1; road: 3–4–1)

Game	Result	Date	Score	Opponent	Record
23	W	December 2, 1972	7–2	@ New York Raiders (1972–73)	11–11–1
24	L	December 3, 1972	4–5	@ Ottawa Nationals (1972–73)	11–12–1
25	L	December 5, 1972	4–6	New York Raiders (1972–73)	11–13–1
26	L	December 7, 1972	0–3	@ Minnesota Fighting Saints (1972–73)	11–14–1
27	L	December 8, 1972	2–6	@ Winnipeg Jets (1972–73)	11–15–1
28	W	December 12, 1972	6–4	Alberta Oilers (1972–73)	12–15–1
29	L	December 13, 1972	2–3	Alberta Oilers (1972–73)	12–16–1
30	W	December 15, 1972	3–2	@ Minnesota Fighting Saints (1972–73)	13–16–1
31	T	December 17, 1972	4–4	Los Angeles Sharks (1972–73)	13–16–2
32	W	December 19, 1972	7–5	Los Angeles Sharks (1972–73)	14–16–2
33	W	December 23, 1972	7–3	Philadelphia Blazers (1972–73)	15–16–2
34	T	December 26, 1972	3–3	@ Ottawa Nationals (1972–73)	15–16–3
35	W	December 29, 1972	4–2	@ New England Whalers (1972–73)	16–16–3
36	L	December 30, 1972	3–4 OT	@ Cleveland Crusaders (1972–73)	16–17–3

January: 10–2–1, 21 points (home: 6–2–0; road: 4–0–1)

Game	Result	Date	Score	Opponent	Record
37	T	January 1, 1973	4–4	@ Minnesota Fighting Saints (1972–73)	16–17–4
38	W	January 9, 1973	7–5	New England Whalers (1972–73)	17–17–4
39	W	January 11, 1973	5–0	@ Chicago Cougars (1972–73)	18–17–4
40	W	January 13, 1973	6–2	Chicago Cougars (1972–73)	19–17–4
41	W	January 15, 1973	5–4	Chicago Cougars (1972–73)	20–17–4
42	L	January 17, 1973	0–5	Cleveland Crusaders (1972–73)	20–18–4
43	W	January 18, 1973	8–3	@ Chicago Cougars (1972–73)	21–18–4
44	W	January 20, 1973	4–3	@ Philadelphia Blazers (1972–73)	22–18–4
45	W	January 21, 1973	5–2	Ottawa Nationals (1972–73)	23–18–4
46	W	January 23, 1973	11–3	Ottawa Nationals (1972–73)	24–18–4
47	W	January 25, 1973	5–2	@ Minnesota Fighting Saints (1972–73)	25–18–4
48	W	January 28, 1973	4–3	Chicago Cougars (1972–73)	26–18–4
49	L	January 30, 1973	2–5	Los Angeles Sharks (1972–73)	26–19–4

February: 7–7–0, 14 points (home: 6–3–0; road: 1–4–0)

Game	Result	Date	Score	Opponent	Record
50	L	February 1, 1973	4–5 OT	New England Whalers (1972–73)	26–20–4
51	W	February 3, 1973	7–1	Minnesota Fighting Saints (1972–73)	27–20–4
52	L	February 5, 1973	3–6	Minnesota Fighting Saints (1972–73)	27–21–4
53	W	February 7, 1973	5–2	Winnipeg Jets (1972–73)	28–21–4
54	L	February 8, 1973	1–3	Winnipeg Jets (1972–73)	28–22–4
55	L	February 10, 1973	0–3	@ Chicago Cougars (1972–73)	28–23–4
56	L	February 13, 1973	3–5	@ Alberta Oilers (1972–73)	28–24–4
57	W	February 15, 1973	5–3	@ Alberta Oilers (1972–73)	29–24–4
58	L	February 16, 1973	0–7	@ Winnipeg Jets (1972–73)	29–25–4
59	L	February 18, 1973	2–4	@ Winnipeg Jets (1972–73)	29–26–4
60	W	February 22, 1973	4–1	Quebec Nordiques (1972–73)	30–26–4
61	W	February 25, 1973	4–1	Minnesota Fighting Saints (1972–73)	31–26–4
62	W	February 27, 1973	5–4	Alberta Oilers (1972–73)	32–26–4
63	W	February 28, 1973	3–2 OT	Alberta Oilers (1972–73)	33–26–4

March: 5–9–0, 10 points (home: 2–5–0; road: 3–4–0)

Game	Result	Date	Score	Opponent	Record
64	L	March 3, 1973	3–4	Quebec Nordiques (1972–73)	33–27–4
65	L	March 4, 1973	3–6	Quebec Nordiques (1972–73)	33–28–4
66	W	March 7, 1973	3–1	@ Los Angeles Sharks (1972–73)	34–28–4
67	L	March 9, 1973	1–5	@ Los Angeles Sharks (1972–73)	34–29–4
68	W	March 11, 1973	4–2	@ Philadelphia Blazers (1972–73)	35–29–4
69	L	March 13, 1973	3–4	@ Philadelphia Blazers (1972–73)	35–30–4
70	L	March 14, 1973	1–5	@ New York Raiders (1972–73)	35–31–4
71	L	March 18, 1973	2–3 OT	New York Raiders (1972–73)	35–32–4
72	W	March 19, 1973	5–1	Philadelphia Blazers (1972–73)	36–32–4
73	L	March 21, 1973	3–7	Philadelphia Blazers (1972–73)	36–33–4
74	L	March 25, 1973	2–4	Cleveland Crusaders (1972–73)	36–34–4
75	W	March 27, 1973	6–1	@ New England Whalers (1972–73)	37–34–4
76	W	March 29, 1973	5–3	New York Raiders (1972–73)	38–34–4
77	L	March 31, 1973	1–5	@ Quebec Nordiques (1972–73)	38–35–4

April: 1–0–0, 2 points (home: 0–0–0; road: 1–0–0)

Game	Result	Date	Score	Opponent	Record
78	W	April 1, 1973	6–3	@ Ottawa Nationals (1972–73)	39–35–4

Legend: Win (2 points) Loss (0 points) Tie (1 point)

== Playoffs ==
1973 Avco Cup playoffs
Quarterfinals vs. Los Angeles Sharks – Aeros win 4–2

Game	Date	Visitor	Score	Home	Series
1	April 5	Los Angeles Sharks	2–7	Houston Aeros	1–0
2	April 7	Los Angeles Sharks	4–2	Houston Aeros	1–1
3	April 11	Houston Aeros	2–3	Los Angeles Sharks	1–2
4	April 13	Houston Aeros	3–2 OT	Los Angeles Sharks	2–2
5	April 15	Los Angeles Sharks	3–6	Houston Aeros	3–2
6	April 17	Houston Aeros	3–2	Los Angeles Sharks	4–2

Semifinals vs. Winnipeg Jets – Jets win 4–0

Game	Date	Visitor	Score	Home	Series
1	April 22	Houston Aeros	1–5	Winnipeg Jets	0–1
2	April 24	Houston Aeros	0–2	Winnipeg Jets	0–2
3	April 26	Winnipeg Jets	2–4	Houston Aeros	0–3
4	April 29	Winnipeg Jets	0–3	Houston Aeros	0–4

Legend: Win Loss

== Player statistics ==
Scoring

Regular season
Player	Pos	GP	G	A	Pts	PIM	+/-	PPG	SHG	GWG
Gord Labossiere	C	78	36	60	96	56	0	10	0	1
Ted Taylor	LW	73	34	42	76	103	0	5	1	4
Murray Hall	RW	76	28	42	70	84	0	7	2	7
Larry Lund	C	77	21	45	66	120	0	4	0	2
Poul Popiel	D	73	16	48	64	158	0	5	0	2
Don Grierson	RW	78	22	22	44	83	0	5	0	0
Duke Harris	RW	75	30	12	42	14	0	4	5	0
Frank Hughes	LW	77	22	19	41	41	0	4	0	0
Brian McDonald	C	71	20	20	40	78	0	0	0	0
Ed Hoekstra	C	78	11	28	39	12	0	0	1	0
Larry Hale	D	68	4	26	30	65	0	0	0	0
Cleland Mortson	RW	67	13	16	29	95	0	2	0	0
Dunc McCallum	D	69	9	20	29	112	0	2	0	0
John Schella	D	77	2	24	26	239	0	0	1	0
Jack Stanfield	LW	71	8	12	20	8	0	0	0	0
Brian Smith	LW	48	7	6	13	19	0	2	0	0
Ray Larose	D	68	1	10	11	25	0	0	0	0
Gord Kannegiesser	D	45	0	10	10	32	0	0	0	0
Bill Prentice	D	3	0	1	1	0	0	0	0	0
Bill Hughes	G	3	0	0	0	2	0	0	0	0
Don McLeod	G	41	0	0	0	6	0	0	0	0
Wayne Rutledge	G	36	0	0	0	11	0	0	0	0

Goaltending
Player	MIN	GP	W	L	T	GA	GAA	SO
Wayne Rutledge	2,163	36	20	14	2	110	3.05	0
Don McLeod	2,410	41	19	20	1	143	3.56	1
Bill Hughes	170	3	0	1	1	11	3.88	0
Team:	4743	78	39	35	4	264	3.34	1

=== Postseason ===
Player	Pos	GP	G	A	Pts	PIM	PPG	SHG	GWG
Poul Popiel	D	10	2	9	11	23	1	0	0
Larry Lund	C	10	3	7	10	24	0	0	1
Murray Hall	RW	10	4	4	8	18	2	0	2
Frank Hughes	LW	10	4	4	8	2	3	0	0
Dunc McCallum	D	10	2	3	5	6	1	0	0
Gord Labossiere	C	6	1	4	5	8	1	0	0
Ted Taylor	LW	10	3	1	4	10	1	0	1
Brian McDonald	C	10	3	0	3	16	0	0	0
Larry Hale	D	10	1	2	3	2	0	0	0
Ed Hoekstra	C	9	1	2	3	0	0	0	0
Cleland Mortson	RW	10	0	3	3	16	0	0	0
Duke Harris	RW	10	1	1	2	4	0	1	0
John Schella	D	10	0	2	2	12	0	0	0
Brian Smith	LW	10	0	2	2	0	0	0	0
Jack Stanfield	LW	9	1	0	1	0	0	0	0
Gord Kannegiesser	D	9	0	1	1	11	0	0	0
Don Grierson	RW	3	0	0	0	6	0	0	0
Don McLeod	G	3	0	0	0	0	0	0	0
Wayne Rutledge	G	7	0	0	0	0	0	0	0

Player	MIN	GP	W	L	GA	GAA	SO
Wayne Rutledge	423	7	4	3	20	2.84	0
Don McLeod	178	3	0	3	8	2.70	0
Team:	601	10	4	6	28	2.80	0

Note: Pos = Position; GP = Games played; G = Goals; A = Assists; Pts = Points; +/- = plus/minus; PIM = Penalty minutes; PPG = Power-play goals; SHG = Short-handed goals; GWG = Game-winning goals
MIN = Minutes played; W = Wins; L = Losses; T = Ties; GA = Goals-against; GAA = Goals-against average; SO = Shutouts;

== Awards and records ==
1973 WHA All-Star Game (January 6, 1973)

- Gord Labossiere
- Ted Taylor

== See also ==
- 1972–73 WHA season
