= 1972–73 Winnipeg Jets season =

WHA hockey team season (inaugural season)

1972–73 Winnipeg Jets
- Western Division champions
- League: 2nd WHA
- Division: 1st Western
- 1972–73 record: 43–31–4
- Home record: 26–11–2
- Road record: 17–20–2
- Goals for: 285
- Goals against: 249

Team information
- General manager: Annis Stukus
- Coach: Bobby Hull; Nick Mickoski
- Captain: Ab McDonald
- Alternate captains: Bill Sutherland; Bob Woytowich
- Arena: Winnipeg Arena
- Average attendance: 6,102 (55.5%)

Team leaders
- Goals: Bobby Hull (51)
- Assists: Norm Beaudin (65)
- Points: Bobby Hull (103); Norm Beaudin (103)
- Penalty minutes: Steve Cuddie (121)
- Wins: Ernie Wakely (26)
- Goals against average: Joe Daley (2.89)

The 1972–73 Winnipeg Jets season was their first season in the World Hockey Association (WHA). The Jets' first player signed was Norm Beaudin ("the Original Jet") and their first major signing was Bobby Hull.

== Offseason ==
=== Bobby Hull ===
Long unhappy because of his relatively poor salary in the period when he was hockey's preeminent superstar, Hull responded to overtures from the upstart World Hockey Association's Winnipeg Jets in 1972 by jesting that he'd jump to them for a million dollars, a sum then considered absurd. Gathering the other league owners together to contribute to the unprecedented amount on the grounds that inking such a major star would give instant credibility to the new rival league that was competing directly against the entrenched NHL, Jets' owner Ben Hatskin agreed to the sum and signed Hull for a contract worth $1,000,000 over ten years. Although his debut with Winnipeg was held up in litigation by the NHL, Hull instantly became the WHA's greatest star.

== Regular season ==
When the Jets played their first game on October 12 in New York against the Raiders, the Jets were without Bobby Hull. He was in court battling his former team, the Chicago Black Hawks over his new contract. The Jets would still win that first game 6–4. Three days later, the Jets would make their home debut losing to the Alberta Oilers 5–2. Bobby Hull won his court battle and joined the Jets 15 games into the season. Bobby Hull captured the WHA's first MVP award, by scoring 51 goals. The Jets won the Western Division with a 43–31–4 record.

=== Season standings ===
Western Division
	GP	W	L	T	GF	GA	PIM	Pts
Winnipeg Jets	78	43	31	4	285	249	757	90
Houston Aeros	78	39	35	4	284	269	1363	82
Los Angeles Sharks	78	37	35	6	259	250	1477	80
Minnesota Fighting Saints	78	38	37	3	250	269	843	79
Alberta Oilers	78	38	37	3	269	256	1134	79
Chicago Cougars	78	26	50	2	245	295	811	54

== Schedule and results ==
1972–73 regular season
October: 6–3–1, 13 points (home: 4–1–1; road: 2–2–0)

Game	Result	Date	Score	Opponent	Record
1	W	October 12, 1972	6–4	@ New York Raiders	1–0–0
2	W	October 13, 1972	4–3	@ Minnesota Fighting Saints	2–0–0
3	L	October 15, 1972	2–5	Alberta Oilers	2–1–0
4	L	October 17, 1972	2–3 OT	@ Alberta Oilers	2–2–0
5	T	October 20, 1972	1–1	Minnesota Fighting Saints	2–2–1
6	W	October 22, 1972	6–3	Philadelphia Blazers	3–2–1
7	W	October 24, 1972	5–3	Philadelphia Blazers	4–2–1
8	W	October 27, 1972	4–2	Chicago Cougars	5–2–1
9	W	October 29, 1972	5–3	Houston Aeros	6–2–1
10	L	October 31, 1972	1–3	@ Chicago Cougars	6–3–1

November: 10–7–1, 21 points (home: 6–2–0; road: 4–5–1)

Game	Result	Date	Score	Opponent	Record
11	L	November 1, 1972	0–3	@ Minnesota Fighting Saints	6–4–1
12	L	November 3, 1972	6–9	New York Raiders	6–5–1
13	W	November 5, 1972	3–1	New York Raiders	7–5–1
14	L	November 6, 1972	2–6	@ New England Whalers	7–6–1
15	L	November 8, 1972	2–3	@ Quebec Nordiques	7–7–1
16	W	November 9, 1972	4–1	@ Ottawa Nationals	8–7–1
17	L	November 10, 1972	1–5	Minnesota Fighting Saints	8–8–1
18	W	November 12, 1972	5–2	Los Angeles Sharks	9–8–1
19	W	November 14, 1972	8–0	Los Angeles Sharks	10–8–1
20	L	November 15, 1972	1–3	@ Alberta Oilers	10–9–1
21	W	November 17, 1972	5–1	@ Los Angeles Sharks	11–9–1
22	W	November 19, 1972	4–3	@ Los Angeles Sharks	12–9–1
23	W	November 21, 1972	4–2	@ Houston Aeros	13–9–1
24	L	November 23, 1972	5–6 OT	@ Houston Aeros	13–10–1
25	W	November 24, 1972	5–3	Quebec Nordiques	14–10–1
26	W	November 26, 1972	4–1	Quebec Nordiques	15–10–1
27	W	November 28, 1972	3–0	Alberta Oilers	16–10–1
28	T	November 30, 1972	3–3	@ Alberta Oilers	16–10–2

December: 6–7–0, 12 points (home: 4–2–0; road: 2–5–0)

Game	Result	Date	Score	Opponent	Record
29	L	December 1, 1972	3–4	Ottawa Nationals	16–11–2
30	W	December 3, 1972	5–1	Minnesota Fighting Saints	17–11–2
31	L	December 5, 1972	2–4	Quebec Nordiques	17–12–2
32	W	December 6, 1972	7–1	Chicago Cougars	18–12–2
33	W	December 8, 1972	6–2	Houston Aeros	19–12–2
34	W	December 9, 1972	3–2 OT	@ Cleveland Crusaders	20–12–2
35	L	December 11, 1972	3–4	@ New England Whalers	20–13–2
36	L	December 13, 1972	4–7	@ Philadelphia Blazers	20–14–2
37	L	December 15, 1972	4–6	@ Philadelphia Blazers	20–15–2
38	W	December 17, 1972	4–3	@ New York Raiders	21–15–2
39	L	December 21, 1972	0–3	@ Minnesota Fighting Saints	21–16–2
40	L	December 22, 1972	2–3	@ Chicago Cougars	21–17–2
41	W	December 26, 1972	3–2	Chicago Cougars	22–17–2

January: 7–4–1, 15 points (home: 5–1–0; road: 2–3–1)

Game	Result	Date	Score	Opponent	Record
42	L	January 1, 1973	3–7	@ Alberta Oilers	22–18–2
43	W	January 7, 1973	6–2	@ Minnesota Fighting Saints	23–18–2
44	W	January 10, 1973	6–1	Alberta Oilers	24–18–2
45	W	January 12, 1973	5–3	Cleveland Crusaders	25–18–2
46	W	January 14, 1973	3–1	Cleveland Crusaders	26–18–2
47	W	January 16, 1973	3–1	Minnesota Fighting Saints	27–18–2
48	W	January 19, 1973	6–2	New England Whalers	28–18–2
49	L	January 21, 1973	2–7	New England Whalers	28–19–2
50	L	January 23, 1973	4–5 OT	@ Cleveland Crusaders	28–20–2
51	L	January 24, 1973	1–6	@ New England Whalers	28–21–2
52	T	January 26, 1973	2–2	@ Quebec Nordiques	28–21–3
53	W	January 28, 1973	5–4	@ Ottawa Nationals	29–21–3

February: 9–2–0, 18 points (home: 4–1–0; road: 5–1–0)

Game	Result	Date	Score	Opponent	Record
54	L	February 2, 1973	3–4	Alberta Oilers	29–22–3
55	W	February 4, 1973	5–3	@ Alberta Oilers	30–22–3
56	L	February 7, 1973	2–5	@ Houston Aeros	30–23–3
57	W	February 8, 1973	3–1	@ Houston Aeros	31–23–3
58	W	February 10, 1973	6–5 OT	@ Los Angeles Sharks	32–23–3
59	W	February 11, 1973	3–0	@ Los Angeles Sharks	33–23–3
60	W	February 15, 1973	7–2	@ Chicago Cougars	34–23–3
61	W	February 16, 1973	7–0	Houston Aeros	35–23–3
62	W	February 18, 1973	4–2	Houston Aeros	36–23–3
63	W	February 25, 1973	5–3	Philadelphia Blazers	37–23–3
64	W	February 27, 1973	5–1	Chicago Cougars	38–23–3

March: 5–7–1, 11 points (home: 3–4–1; road: 2–3–0)

Game	Result	Date	Score	Opponent	Record
65	W	March 2, 1973	2–1	Los Angeles Sharks	39–23–3
66	W	March 4, 1973	2–1	Los Angeles Sharks	40–23–3
67	L	March 6, 1973	2–5	@ Ottawa Nationals	40–24–3
68	W	March 8, 1973	7–4	@ Quebec Nordiques	41–24–3
69	L	March 10, 1973	2–3 OT	@ New York Raiders	41–25–3
70	L	March 11, 1973	2–11	Cleveland Crusaders	41–26–3
71	L	March 14, 1973	5–7	New England Whalers	41–27–3
72	L	March 16, 1973	1–6	Ottawa Nationals	41–28–3
73	L	March 18, 1973	2–4	Ottawa Nationals	41–29–3
74	T	March 22, 1973	1–1	Alberta Oilers	41–29–4
75	W	March 25, 1973	8–4	New York Raiders	42–29–4
76	W	March 28, 1973	4–3 OT	@ Chicago Cougars	43–29–4
77	L	March 30, 1973	2–4	@ Cleveland Crusaders	43–30–4

April: 0–1–0, 0 points (home: 0–0–0; road: 0–1–0)

Game	Result	Date	Score	Opponent	Record
78	L	April 1, 1973	2–4	@ Philadelphia Blazers	43–31–4

Legend: Win (2 points) Loss (0 points) Tie (1 point)

== Playoffs ==
In the playoffs, the Jets would beat the Minnesota Fighting Saints in 5 games. In the second round of the playoffs, the Jets beat the Houston Aeros in 4 straight to reach the Avco World Trophy finals. In the finals, the Jets were beaten by the New England Whalers in 5 games.

1973 Avco World Trophy playoffs
Quarterfinals vs. (W4) Minnesota Fighting Saints – Jets win 4–1

Game	Date	Visitor	Score	Home	Series
1	April 6	Minnesota Fighting Saints	1–3	Winnipeg Jets	1–0
2	April 8	Minnesota Fighting Saints	2–5	Winnipeg Jets	2–0
3	April 10	Winnipeg Jets	4–6	Minnesota Fighting Saints	2–1
4	April 11	Winnipeg Jets	3–2 OT	Minnesota Fighting Saints	3–1
5	April 15	Minnesota Fighting Saints	5–8	Winnipeg Jets	4–1

Semifinals vs. (W2) Houston Aeros – Jets win 4–0

Game	Date	Visitor	Score	Home	Series
1	April 20	Houston Aeros	1–5	Winnipeg Jets	1–0
2	April 22	Houston Aeros	0–2	Winnipeg Jets	2–0
3	April 24	Winnipeg Jets	4–2	Houston Aeros	3–0
4	April 26	Winnipeg Jets	3–0	Houston Aeros	4–0

Avco World Trophy Finals vs. (E1) New England Whalers – Whalers win 4–1

Game	Date	Visitor	Score	Home	Series
1	April 29	Winnipeg Jets	2–7	New England Whalers	0–1
2	May 2	New England Whalers	7–4	Winnipeg Jets	0–2
3	May 3	New England Whalers	3–4	Winnipeg Jets	1–2
4	May 5	Winnipeg Jets	2–4	New England Whalers	1–3
5	May 6	Winnipeg Jets	6–9	New England Whalers	1–4

Legend: Win Loss

== Awards and records ==
- Bobby Hull, Gary L. Davidson Award

== Player statistics ==
=== Forwards ===
Regular season
Player	GP	G	A	Pts	PIM
Bobby Hull	63	51	52	103	37
Norm Beaudin	78	38	65	103	15
Chris Bordeleau	78	47	54	101	12
Dan Johnson	76	19	23	42	17
Ab McDonald	77	17	24	41	16
Milt Black	75	18	16	34	14
Wally Boyer	69	6	28	34	27
Dunc Rousseau	75	16	17	33	75
Cal Swenson	77	7	21	28	19
Jean-Guy Gratton	71	15	12	27	37
Bill Sutherland	48	6	16	22	34
Garth Rizzuto	61	10	10	20	32
Freeman Asmundson	76	2	14	16	54
Brian Cadle	56	4	4	8	39

=== Defencemen ===
Scoring

Regular season
Player	GP	G	A	Pts	PIM
Larry Hornung	77	13	45	58	28
Joe Zanussi	73	4	21	25	53
Steve Cuddie	77	7	13	20	121
Bob Ash	76	3	14	17	39
Bob Woytowich	62	2	4	6	47
John Shmyr	7	0	0	0	2

=== Goaltending ===
Player	GP	MIN	W	L	T	SO	GAA
Joe Daley	29	1718	17	10	1	2	2.89
Ernie Wakely	49	2894	26	19	3	2	3.15
Gordon Tumilson	3	138	0	2	0	0	4.34
