= 1972–73 Chicago Cougars season =

World Hockey Association team season

1972–73 Chicago Cougars
- Division: 6th West
- 1972–73 record: 26–50–2
- Home record: 17–22–0
- Road record: 9–28–2
- Goals for: 245
- Goals against: 295

Team information
- General manager: Edwin G. Short
- Coach: Marcel Pronovost
- Captain: Larry Cahan
- Alternate captains: Reg Fleming; Rosaire Paiement; Bob Sicinski
- Arena: International Amphitheatre
- Average attendance: 4,589 (51.0%)

Team leaders
- Goals: Rosaire Paiement (33)
- Assists: Bob Sicinski (63)
- Points: Bob Sicinski (88)
- Penalty minutes: Rosaire Paiement (135)
- Wins: Jim McLeod (22)
- Goals against average: Jim McLeod (3.32)

The 1972–73 Chicago Cougars season was the Chicago Cougars' inaugural season of operation in the World Hockey Association. The team did not qualify for the playoffs.

== Regular season ==
=== Final standings ===
Western Division
	GP	W	L	T	GF	GA	PIM	Pts
Winnipeg Jets	78	43	31	4	285	249	757	90
Houston Aeros	78	39	35	4	284	269	1363	82
Los Angeles Sharks	78	37	35	6	259	250	1477	80
Minnesota Fighting Saints	78	38	37	3	250	269	843	79
Alberta Oilers	78	38	37	3	269	256	1134	79
Chicago Cougars	78	26	50	2	245	295	811	54

== Schedule and results ==
1972–73 regular season
October

Game	Result	Date	Score	Opponent	Record
1	L	October 12, 1972	2–3	@ Houston Aeros (1972–73)	0–1–0
2	L	October 15, 1972	2–3	@ Minnesota Fighting Saints (1972–73)	0–2–0
3	L	October 16, 1972	1–4	@ New England Whalers (1972–73)	0–3–0
4	L	October 19, 1972	2–6	@ Ottawa Nationals (1972–73)	0–4–0
5	W	October 22, 1972	4–2	@ Los Angeles Sharks (1972–73)	1–4–0
6	T	October 24, 1972	3–3	@ Alberta Oilers (1972–73)	1–4–1
7	L	October 27, 1972	2–4	@ Winnipeg Jets (1972–73)	1–5–1
8	W	October 31, 1972	3–1	Winnipeg Jets (1972–73)	2–5–1

November

Game	Result	Date	Score	Opponent	Record
9	L	November 1, 1972	2–4	@ New England Whalers (1972–73)	2–6–1
10	L	November 4, 1972	2–3 OT	Los Angeles Sharks (1972–73)	2–7–1
11	L	November 5, 1972	2–3	@ Quebec Nordiques (1972–73)	2–8–1
12	L	November 7, 1972	2–3	Houston Aeros (1972–73)	2–9–1
13	L	November 11, 1972	1–4	Cleveland Crusaders (1972–73)	2–10–1
14	L	November 14, 1972	3–4	Philadelphia Blazers (1972–73)	2–11–1
15	L	November 17, 1972	1–3	@ Alberta Oilers (1972–73)	2–12–1
16	W	November 19, 1972	4–3	@ Minnesota Fighting Saints (1972–73)	3–12–1
17	W	November 23, 1972	8–1	@ Ottawa Nationals (1972–73)	4–12–1
18	W	November 25, 1972	4–3	@ Philadelphia Blazers (1972–73)	5–12–1
19	L	November 28, 1972	2–6	@ Quebec Nordiques (1972–73)	5–13–1

December

Game	Result	Date	Score	Opponent	Record
20	L	December 1, 1972	3–5	Los Angeles Sharks (1972–73)	5–14–1
21	L	December 2, 1972	2–4	Los Angeles Sharks (1972–73)	5–15–1
22	W	December 5, 1972	3–2 OT	@ Minnesota Fighting Saints (1972–73)	6–15–1
23	L	December 6, 1972	1–7	@ Winnipeg Jets (1972–73)	6–16–1
24	W	December 8, 1972	4–3 OT	Minnesota Fighting Saints (1972–73)	7–16–1
25	L	December 9, 1972	2–4	Quebec Nordiques (1972–73)	7–17–1
26	L	December 11, 1972	3–8	@ New York Raiders (1972–73)	7–18–1
27	W	December 13, 1972	6–3	New England Whalers (1972–73)	8–18–1
28	L	December 14, 1972	3–6	Minnesota Fighting Saints (1972–73)	8–19–1
29	L	December 17, 1972	2–4	@ Minnesota Fighting Saints (1972–73)	8–20–1
30	W	December 19, 1972	6–1	Cleveland Crusaders (1972–73)	9–20–1
31	L	December 20, 1972	5–8	@ Philadelphia Blazers (1972–73)	9–21–1
32	W	December 22, 1972	3–2	Winnipeg Jets (1972–73)	10–21–1
33	W	December 23, 1972	3–2	Alberta Oilers (1972–73)	11–21–1
34	W	December 25, 1972	3–2	Alberta Oilers (1972–73)	12–21–1
35	L	December 26, 1972	2–3	@ Winnipeg Jets (1972–73)	12–22–1
36	W	December 28, 1972	6–3	Philadelphia Blazers (1972–73)	13–22–1
37	L	December 30, 1972	2–4	Ottawa Nationals (1972–73)	13–23–1

January

Game	Result	Date	Score	Opponent	Record
38	L	January 10, 1973	5–8	Los Angeles Sharks (1972–73)	13–24–1
39	L	January 11, 1973	0–5	Houston Aeros (1972–73)	13–25–1
40	L	January 13, 1973	2–6	@ Houston Aeros (1972–73)	13–26–1
41	L	January 15, 1973	4–5	@ Houston Aeros (1972–73)	13–27–1
42	L	January 17, 1973	2–4	New England Whalers (1972–73)	13–28–1
43	L	January 18, 1973	3–8	Houston Aeros (1972–73)	13–29–1
44	W	January 20, 1973	6–4	@ Alberta Oilers (1972–73)	14–29–1
45	L	January 22, 1973	1–6	@ Alberta Oilers (1972–73)	14–30–1
46	W	January 23, 1973	7–1	Quebec Nordiques (1972–73)	15–30–1
47	W	January 25, 1973	9–2	New York Raiders (1972–73)	16–30–1
48	L	January 27, 1973	1–2	Cleveland Crusaders (1972–73)	16–31–1
49	L	January 28, 1973	3–4	@ Houston Aeros (1972–73)	16–32–1
50	W	January 30, 1973	4–2	Minnesota Fighting Saints (1972–73)	17–32–1

February

Game	Result	Date	Score	Opponent	Record
51	W	February 2, 1973	4–1	Ottawa Nationals (1972–73)	18–32–1
52	W	February 3, 1973	4–2	New York Raiders (1972–73)	19–32–1
53	L	February 5, 1973	5–7	@ Cleveland Crusaders (1972–73)	19–33–1
54	W	February 8, 1973	5–2	Quebec Nordiques (1972–73)	20–33–1
55	W	February 10, 1973	3–0	Houston Aeros (1972–73)	21–33–1
56	W	February 13, 1973	6–1	@ Los Angeles Sharks (1972–73)	22–33–1
57	L	February 15, 1973	2–7	Winnipeg Jets (1972–73)	22–34–1
58	L	February 17, 1973	1–3	Ottawa Nationals (1972–73)	22–35–1
59	L	February 18, 1973	5–7	@ Minnesota Fighting Saints (1972–73)	22–36–1
60	W	February 20, 1973	4–2	@ Quebec Nordiques (1972–73)	23–36–1
61	W	February 24, 1973	5–2	@ Cleveland Crusaders (1972–73)	24–36–1
62	L	February 27, 1973	1–5	@ Winnipeg Jets (1972–73)	24–37–1

March

Game	Result	Date	Score	Opponent	Record
63	L	March 4, 1973	4–6	@ Ottawa Nationals (1972–73)	24–38–1
64	T	March 5, 1973	4–4	@ New York Raiders (1972–73)	24–38–2
65	W	March 6, 1973	2–1 OT	Philadelphia Blazers (1972–73)	25–38–2
66	L	March 8, 1973	2–3 OT	Alberta Oilers (1972–73)	25–39–2
67	L	March 10, 1973	4–5 OT	Alberta Oilers (1972–73)	25–40–2
68	L	March 12, 1973	7–8	@ New York Raiders (1972–73)	25–41–2
69	L	March 13, 1973	3–4 OT	New England Whalers (1972–73)	25–42–2
70	L	March 15, 1973	4–7	Minnesota Fighting Saints (1972–73)	25–43–2
71	W	March 17, 1973	6–3	New York Raiders (1972–73)	26–43–2
72	L	March 22, 1973	1–2 OT	Minnesota Fighting Saints (1972–73)	26–44–2
73	L	March 23, 1973	1–3	@ New England Whalers (1972–73)	26–45–2
74	L	March 25, 1973	0–1	@ Los Angeles Sharks (1972–73)	26–46–2
75	L	March 27, 1973	1–4	@ Los Angeles Sharks (1972–73)	26–47–2
76	L	March 28, 1973	3–4 OT	Winnipeg Jets (1972–73)	26–48–2
77	L	March 31, 1973	1–5	@ Philadelphia Blazers (1972–73)	26–49–2

April

Game	Result	Date	Score	Opponent	Record
78	L	April 1, 1973	1–5	@ Cleveland Crusaders (1972–73)	26–50–2

Legend: Win (2 points) Loss (0 points) Tie (1 point)

== Player statistics ==
=== Skating ===
Player	Position	GP	G	A	Pts	PIM	+/-	PPG	SHG	GWG
Bob Sicinski	C	77	25	63	88	18	0	7	1	2
Rosaire Paiement	C	78	33	36	69	135	0	5	0	4
Reggie Fleming	D/LW	75	23	45	68	93	0	7	1	2
Jan Popiel	LW	76	31	34	65	77	0	6	0	4
Bob Whitlock	C	75	23	28	51	53	0	3	2	0
Larry Mavety	D	67	9	40	49	73	0	2	1	0
Rick Morris	LW	76	31	17	48	84	0	4	0	0
Dan Lodboa	LW	58	15	18	33	16	0	4	0	0
Bob Liddington	LW	78	20	11	31	24	0	1	0	0
Ron F. Anderson	D	74	3	26	29	34	0	0	1	0
Bob Barber	D	75	4	19	23	39	0	0	0	0
Jim Benzelock	RW	43	9	12	21	23	0	3	0	0
Dick Proceviat	D	53	4	14	18	33	0	1	0	0
Rod Zaine	C	74	3	14	17	25	0	0	0	0
Darrel Knibbs	RW	41	3	8	11	0	0	0	0	0
Dick Sarrazin	RW	33	3	8	11	2	0	2	0	0
Larry Cahan	D	75	1	10	11	44	0	0	0	0
Brian Glenwright	LW	50	2	5	7	0	0	0	0	0
Bernie Blanchette	RW	24	2	3	5	8	0	0	0	0
Ed Hatoum	RW	15	1	1	2	2	0	0	0	0
Jim McLeod	G	54	0	1	1	2	0	0	0	0
Andre Gill	G	33	0	0	0	6	0	0	0	0
Dick McGlynn	D	30	0	0	0	12	0	0	0	0
Paul Menard	G	1	0	0	0	0	0	0	0	0
Jerry Trooien	LW	2	0	0	0	0	0	0	0	0
Pierre Viau	D	4	0	0	0	0	0	0	0	0

=== Goaltending ===
Player	MIN	GP	W	L	T	GA	GAA	SO
Jim McLeod	2996	54	22	25	2	166	3.32	1
Andre Gill	1709	33	4	24	0	118	4.14	0
Paul Menard	45	1	0	1	0	5	6.67	0
Team:	4750	78	26	50	2	289	3.65	1

Note: Pos = Position; GP = Games played; G = Goals; A = Assists; Pts = Points; +/- = plus/minus; PIM = Penalty minutes; PPG = Power-play goals; SHG = Short-handed goals; GWG = Game-winning goals
MIN = Minutes played; W = Wins; L = Losses; T = Ties; GA = Goals-against; GAA = Goals-against average; SO = Shutouts;

== See also ==
- 1972–73 WHA season
