= 1972–73 Los Angeles Sharks season =

World Hockey Association team season

1972–73 Los Angeles Sharks
- Division: 3rd Western
- 1972–73 record: 37–35–6
- Home record: 18–20–1
- Road record: 19–15–5
- Goals for: 259
- Goals against: 250

Team information
- General manager: Dennis Murphy
- Coach: Terry Slater
- Captain: Ted McCaskill
- Alternate captains: Earl Heiskala; Gerry Odrowski; Jim Watson
- Arena: Los Angeles Memorial Sports Arena (35 games); Long Beach Arena (4 games)
- Average attendance: 5,982 (41.7%)

Team leaders
- Goals: Gary Veneruzzo (43)
- Assists: J.P. LeBlanc (50)
- Points: Gary Veneruzzo (73)
- Penalty minutes: Tom Gilmore (191)
- Wins: George Gardner (19)
- Goals against average: Russ Gillow (2.88)

1972–73 Los Angeles Sharks season was the Los Angeles Sharks inaugural season in the World Hockey Association.

== Offseason ==
The WHA awarded a franchise to Los Angeles and it was originally called the "Los Angeles Aces," while the San Francisco franchise was called the Sharks. However, when funding fell through and the San Francisco franchise was then moved to Quebec to become the Nordiques, the Los Angeles group took the name Sharks and created the stylized menacing shark logo. The team colors of red and black were based on the original nickname "aces", being that the two colors in a deck of cards are red and black.

== Regular season ==
The Sharks hung around the .500 mark for much of the season. The Winnipeg Jets, led by Bobby Hull, were clearly the class of the WHA's Western Division. Four teams (the Houston Aeros, Minnesota Fighting Saints, Alberta Oilers, and Sharks staged a season long see-saw battle for 2nd through 5th place, with only the top four making the playoffs (The Chicago Cougars finished in a distant 6th place).

The Sharks strength was their defense, which ranked 3rd in the league. Bart Crashley, Gerry Odrowski, and Jim Watson anchored the blue line. George Gardner (GAA 3.30) was a capable #1 goalie for the first half of the season, while 32-year-old rookie Russ Gillow (2.91 GAA) took over the top spot for most of the second half. In fact, Gillow was second in the WHA to Gerry Cheevers in GAA.

The offense had quality but lacked depth. It was led by 43 goal scorer Gary Veneruzzo while Alton White was 2nd on the team in goals with 20. Veneruzzo also led the team in points with 73, followed by playmaking center J.P. LeBlanc (19 goals and 50 assists for 69 points), and defenseman Bart Crashley, who anchored the power play and chipped in 18 goals and 27 assists.

Sharks special teams were solid, ranking 4th in the league in power play and 5th in penalty killing.

Ultimately, the Sharks went 6–3–1 in their last 10 games, including winning their last two to climb from 5th place to 3rd.

=== Final standings ===
Western Division
	GP	W	L	T	GF	GA	PIM	Pts
Winnipeg Jets	78	43	31	4	285	249	757	90
Houston Aeros	78	39	35	4	284	269	1363	82
Los Angeles Sharks	78	37	35	6	259	250	1477	80
Minnesota Fighting Saints	78	38	37	3	250	269	843	79
Alberta Oilers	78	38	37	3	269	256	1134	79
Chicago Cougars	78	26	50	2	245	295	811	54

== Schedule and results ==
1972–73 regular season
October

Game	Result	Date	Score	Opponent	Record
1	L	October 13, 1972	2–3	Houston Aeros (1972–73)	0–1–0
2	W	October 15, 1972	5–1	@ Houston Aeros (1972–73)	1–1–0
3	W	October 17, 1972	5–1	@ Minnesota Fighting Saints (1972–73)	2–1–0
4	W	October 19, 1972	4–2	Philadelphia Blazers (1972–73)	3–1–0
5	L	October 22, 1972	2–4	Chicago Cougars (1972–73)	3–2–0
6	L	October 25, 1972	5–8	Ottawa Nationals (1972–73)	3–3–0
7	L	October 27, 1972	4–5	@ Philadelphia Blazers (1972–73)	3–4–0
8	W	October 28, 1972	4–3 OT	@ New York Raiders (1972–73)	4–4–0
9	W	October 31, 1972	4–2	@ Quebec Nordiques (1972–73)	5–4–0

November

Game	Result	Date	Score	Opponent	Record
10	T	November 2, 1972	1–1	@ Ottawa Nationals (1972–73)	5–4–1
11	W	November 4, 1972	3–2 OT	@ Chicago Cougars (1972–73)	6–4–1
12	W	November 5, 1972	4–0	Houston Aeros (1972–73)	7–4–1
13	W	November 8, 1972	2–1	New York Raiders (1972–73)	8–4–1
14	L	November 9, 1972	2–7	@ Alberta Oilers (1972–73)	8–5–1
15	L	November 11, 1972	3–5	@ Alberta Oilers (1972–73)	8–6–1
16	L	November 12, 1972	2–5	@ Winnipeg Jets (1972–73)	8–7–1
17	L	November 14, 1972	0–8	@ Winnipeg Jets (1972–73)	8–8–1
18	W	November 15, 1972	6–4	@ Houston Aeros (1972–73)	9–8–1
19	L	November 17, 1972	1–5	Winnipeg Jets (1972–73)	9–9–1
20	L	November 19, 1972	3–4	Winnipeg Jets (1972–73)	9–10–1
21	L	November 21, 1972	2–5	Cleveland Crusaders (1972–73)	9–11–1
22	L	November 23, 1972	3–4	@ Minnesota Fighting Saints (1972–73)	9–12–1
23	L	November 24, 1972	2–3 OT	@ Cleveland Crusaders (1972–73)	9–13–1
24	W	November 26, 1972	6–2	@ New York Raiders (1972–73)	10–13–1
25	L	November 28, 1972	3–4	@ Philadelphia Blazers (1972–73)	10–14–1
26	W	November 30, 1972	6–3	Houston Aeros (1972–73)	11–14–1

December

Game	Result	Date	Score	Opponent	Record
27	W	December 1, 1972	5–3	@ Chicago Cougars (1972–73)	12–14–1
28	W	December 2, 1972	4–2	@ Chicago Cougars (1972–73)	13–14–1
29	W	December 8, 1972	4–2	Alberta Oilers (1972–73)	14–14–1
30	W	December 10, 1972	5–3	Alberta Oilers (1972–73)	15–14–1
31	T	December 12, 1972	3–3	Minnesota Fighting Saints (1972–73)	15–14–2
32	L	December 14, 1972	2–5	New England Whalers (1972–73)	15–15–2
33	T	December 17, 1972	4–4	@ Houston Aeros (1972–73)	15–15–3
34	L	December 19, 1972	5–7	@ Houston Aeros (1972–73)	15–16–3
35	T	December 21, 1972	4–4	@ Ottawa Nationals (1972–73)	15–16–4
36	L	December 23, 1972	1–2	@ Quebec Nordiques (1972–73)	15–17–4
37	W	December 24, 1972	5–3	@ New England Whalers (1972–73)	16–17–4
38	L	December 28, 1972	2–4	Minnesota Fighting Saints (1972–73)	16–18–4
39	W	December 29, 1972	5–2	Minnesota Fighting Saints (1972–73)	17–18–4
40	L	December 31, 1972	1–3	Philadelphia Blazers (1972–73)	17–19–4

January

Game	Result	Date	Score	Opponent	Record
41	W	January 9, 1973	4–3 OT	@ Minnesota Fighting Saints (1972–73)	18–19–4
42	W	January 10, 1973	8–5	@ Chicago Cougars (1972–73)	19–19–4
43	L	January 12, 1973	1–2	Alberta Oilers (1972–73)	19–20–4
44	L	January 13, 1973	1–4	Alberta Oilers (1972–73)	19–21–4
45	W	January 15, 1973	4–3	@ Alberta Oilers (1972–73)	20–21–4
46	L	January 16, 1973	5–6 OT	@ Alberta Oilers (1972–73)	20–22–4
47	L	January 19, 1973	1–4	Cleveland Crusaders (1972–73)	20–23–4
48	W	January 21, 1973	3–2	Cleveland Crusaders (1972–73)	21–23–4
49	L	January 26, 1973	4–5 OT	New York Raiders (1972–73)	21–24–4
50	W	January 28, 1973	9–2	New York Raiders (1972–73)	22–24–4
51	W	January 30, 1973	5–2	@ Houston Aeros (1972–73)	23–24–4

February

Game	Result	Date	Score	Opponent	Record
52	W	February 2, 1973	3–1	New England Whalers (1972–73)	24–24–4
53	W	February 4, 1973	4–3	New England Whalers (1972–73)	25–24–4
54	W	February 8, 1973	3–1	Minnesota Fighting Saints (1972–73)	26–24–4
55	L	February 10, 1973	5–6 OT	Winnipeg Jets (1972–73)	26–25–4
56	L	February 11, 1973	0–3	Winnipeg Jets (1972–73)	26–26–4
57	L	February 13, 1973	1–6	Chicago Cougars (1972–73)	26–27–4
58	L	February 15, 1973	5–6	@ New England Whalers (1972–73)	26–28–4
59	T	February 16, 1973	2–2	@ Quebec Nordiques (1972–73)	26–28–5
60	W	February 18, 1973	4–1	@ Philadelphia Blazers (1972–73)	27–28–5
61	W	February 20, 1973	4–2	@ Ottawa Nationals (1972–73)	28–28–5
62	L	February 24, 1973	3–5	Quebec Nordiques (1972–73)	28–29–5
63	W	February 25, 1973	4–2	Quebec Nordiques (1972–73)	29–29–5

March

Game	Result	Date	Score	Opponent	Record
64	W	March 1, 1973	4–1	@ Minnesota Fighting Saints (1972–73)	30–29–5
65	L	March 2, 1973	1–2	@ Winnipeg Jets (1972–73)	30–30–5
66	L	March 4, 1973	1–2	@ Winnipeg Jets (1972–73)	30–31–5
67	W	March 6, 1973	3–2 OT	Quebec Nordiques (1972–73)	31–31–5
68	L	March 7, 1973	1–3	Houston Aeros (1972–73)	31–32–5
69	W	March 9, 1973	5–1	Houston Aeros (1972–73)	32–32–5
70	W	March 11, 1973	4–2	Ottawa Nationals (1972–73)	33–32–5
71	L	March 13, 1973	1–3	Ottawa Nationals (1972–73)	33–33–5
72	W	March 15, 1973	6–2	@ New York Raiders (1972–73)	34–33–5
73	W	March 17, 1973	2–0	@ Cleveland Crusaders (1972–73)	35–33–5
74	T	March 19, 1973	5–5	@ Cleveland Crusaders (1972–73)	35–33–6
75	L	March 20, 1973	1–4	@ New England Whalers (1972–73)	35–34–6
76	L	March 23, 1973	3–7	Philadelphia Blazers (1972–73)	35–35–6
77	W	March 25, 1973	1–0	Chicago Cougars (1972–73)	36–35–6
78	W	March 27, 1973	4–1	Chicago Cougars (1972–73)	37–35–6

Legend: Win (2 points) Loss (0 points) Tie (1 point)

== Playoffs ==
The Sharks' 3rd place finish enabled them to avoid a first round matchup with Bobby Hull's powerful Winnipeg Jets and earned them a series with the 2nd place Houston Aeros, who finished 2 points ahead of the Sharks in the standings.

After opening in Houston with an uninspired 7–2 loss, the Sharks bounced back to win game two by a 4–2 score. Heading back to L.A. with a split, the Sharks won a thrilling game three by a score of 3–2; goalie Russ Gillow made several spectacular saves to preserve the win. The turning point was game four. The clubs battled through regulation tied at 2; if the Sharks scored the next goal, they would have a commanding 3–1 series lead but if Houston scored, the series would be tied going back to Houston. Winger Murray Hall scored for Houston, and the Sharks didn't win another game, losing game five 6–3 and game six, 3–2. After the series, coach Terry Slater was criticized for starting George Gardner in games 1 and 5 despite the fact Gillow played better the second half of the season. Gardner was pulled in game 1 (a 7–2 loss) and did not play well in game 5 (a 6–3 loss). Garnder's GAA for the series was 5.69 while Gillow's was 2.91. Slater stated he wanted the veteran Gardner to start game 1 over the rookie Gillow.

1973 Avco Cup playoffs
Division Semifinals vs. Houston Aeros – Aeros win 4–2

Game	Date	Visitor	Score	Home	Series
1	April 5	Los Angeles Sharks	2–7	Houston Aeros	0–1
2	April 7	Los Angeles Sharks	4–2	Houston Aeros	1–1
3	April 11	Houston Aeros	2–3	Los Angeles Sharks	2–1
4	April 13	Houston Aeros	3–2 OT	Los Angeles Sharks	2–2
5	April 15	Los Angeles Sharks	3–6	Houston Aeros	2–3
6	April 17	Houston Aeros	3–2	Los Angeles Sharks	2–4

Legend: Win Loss

== Player statistics ==
Regular season
Player	Position	GP	G	A	Pts	PIM	+/-	PPG	SHG	GWG
Gary Veneruzzo	W	78	43	30	73	34	0	13	0	5
J.P. LeBlanc	C	77	19	50	69	49	0	2	1	3
Bart Crashley	D	70	18	27	45	10	0	7	0	0
Joe Szura	C	73	13	32	45	25	0	3	0	0
Alton White	RW	57	20	17	37	22	0	2	0	0
Tom Serviss	C	73	11	26	37	32	0	0	3	0
Gerry Odrowski	D	78	6	31	37	89	0	0	1	0
Mike Byers	RW	56	19	17	36	20	0	2	0	0
Tom Gilmore	LW	71	17	18	35	191	0	6	0	0
Earl Heiskala	LW	70	12	17	29	150	0	2	0	0
Jim Niekamp	D	78	7	22	29	155	0	0	1	0
Bill Young	LW	50	14	12	26	46	0	6	0	0
Peter Slater	RW	73	12	12	24	87	0	3	0	0
Ralph MacSweyn	D	78	0	23	23	39	0	0	0	0
Ted McCaskill	C	73	11	11	22	150	0	0	2	0
Jim Watson	D	75	5	15	20	123	0	1	0	0
Steve Sutherland	LW	44	11	6	17	98	0	0	0	0
Fred Speck	C	28	3	13	16	22	0	0	0	0
Mike Hyndman	RW	19	8	7	15	11	0	1	0	0
Bernie MacNeil	LW	42	4	7	11	48	0	0	0	0
Bob Jones	LW	20	2	7	9	8	0	1	0	0
Howie Heggedal	LW	8	2	1	3	0	0	1	0	0
Jarda Krupicka	RW	6	1	0	1	2	0	0	0	0
Larry Mavety	D	2	1	0	1	2	0	1	0	0
George Gardner	G	49	0	1	1	2	0	0	0	0
Russ Gillow	G	38	0	0	0	6	0	0	0	0
Mike Jakubo	C	7	0	0	0	0	0	0	0	0
Bob Perreault	G	1	0	0	0	0	0	0	0	0
Jerry Zrymiak	D	1	0	0	0	0	0	0	0	0

Playoffs

Player	Position	GP	G	A	Pts	PIM	PPG	SHG	GWG
Fred Speck	C	6	3	2	5	2	1	0	0
Ted McCaskill	C	6	2	3	5	12	0	0	0
J.P. LeBlanc	C	6	0	5	5	2	0	0	0
Tom Gilmore	LW	5	1	3	4	2	0	0	0
Gary Veneruzzo	W	6	3	0	3	4	1	0	1
Jim Niekamp	D	6	2	1	3	10	0	0	0
Ralph MacSweyn	D	6	1	2	3	4	0	0	0
Gerry Odrowski	D	6	1	2	3	6	0	0	1
Mike Hyndman	RW	6	0	3	3	17	0	0	0
Earl Heiskala	LW	5	1	1	2	4	1	0	0
Bart Crashley	D	6	0	2	2	2	0	0	0
Steve Sutherland	LW	6	0	2	2	8	0	0	0
Alton White	RW	6	1	0	1	0	1	0	0
Jerry Zrymiak	D	2	1	0	1	2	0	0	0
Jim Watson	D	4	0	1	1	2	0	0	0
George Gardner	G	3	0	0	0	0	0	0	0
Russ Gillow	G	5	0	0	0	0	0	0	0
Howie Heggedal	LW	1	0	0	0	0	0	0	0
Bernie MacNeil	LW	3	0	0	0	4	0	0	0
Tom Serviss	C	6	0	0	0	0	0	0	0
Peter Slater	RW	6	0	0	0	2	0	0	0
Joe Szura	C	2	0	0	0	0	0	0	0

=== Goaltending ===
Player	MIN	GP	W	L	T	GA	GAA	SO
George Gardner	2713	49	19	22	4	149	3.30	1
Russ Gillow	1982	38	17	13	2	96	2.91	2
Bob Perreault	60	1	1	0	0	2	2.00	0
Team:	4755	78	37	35	6	247	3.12	3

Playoffs

Player	MIN	GP	W	L	GA	GAA	SO
George Gardner	116	3	1	2	11	5.69	0
Russ Gillow	247	5	1	2	12	2.91	0
Team:	363	6	2	4	23	3.80	0

Note: Pos = Position; GP = Games played; G = Goals; A = Assists; Pts = Points; +/- = plus/minus; PIM = Penalty minutes; PPG = Power-play goals; SHG = Short-handed goals; GWG = Game-winning goals
MIN = Minutes played; W = Wins; L = Losses; T = Ties; GA = Goals-against; GAA = Goals-against average; SO = Shutouts;

== Draft picks ==
3rd round, 8th pick (32nd overall pick) – Robert Klein, D – Kamloops

== See also ==
- 1972–73 WHA season
