= 1972–73 New York Raiders season =

World Hockey Association team season

1972–73 New York Raiders
- Division: 6th East
- 1972–73 record: 33–43–2
- Home record: 23–15–1
- Road record: 10–28–1
- Goals for: 303
- Goals against: 334

Team information
- General manager: Marvin Milkes
- Coach: Camille Henry (32–43–2); Ian Wilkie (1–0–0)
- Captain: Norm Ferguson
- Alternate captains: Ken Block; Mike Laughton; Ron Ward
- Arena: Madison Square Garden
- Average attendance: 5,868 (34.0%)

Team leaders
- Goals: Ron Ward (51)
- Assists: Ron Ward (67)
- Points: Ron Ward (118)
- Penalty minutes: Hal Willis (159)
- Wins: Peter Donnelly (22)
- Goals against average: Peter Donnelly (3.56)

The 1972–73 New York Raiders season was the inaugural season for the World Hockey Association (WHA) franchise.

== Regular season ==
=== Final standings ===
Eastern Division
	GP	W	L	T	GF	GA	PIM	Pts
New England Whalers	78	46	30	2	318	263	858	94
Cleveland Crusaders	78	43	32	3	287	239	1095	89
Philadelphia Blazers	78	38	40	0	288	305	1260	76
Ottawa Nationals	78	35	39	4	279	301	1067	74
Quebec Nordiques	78	33	40	5	276	313	1354	71
New York Raiders	78	33	43	2	303	334	900	68

== Schedule and results ==
1972–73 regular season
October

Game	Result	Date	Score	Opponent	Record
1	L	October 12, 1972	4–6	Winnipeg Jets (1972–73)	0–1–0
2	W	October 14, 1972	8–6	Ottawa Nationals (1972–73)	1–1–0
3	W	October 15, 1972	5–0	Philadelphia Blazers (1972–73)	2–1–0
4	L	October 17, 1972	3–4 OT	@ Cleveland Crusaders (1972–73)	2–2–0
5	L	October 19, 1972	1–3	Cleveland Crusaders (1972–73)	2–3–0
6	W	October 21, 1972	3–2	Houston Aeros (1972–73)	3–3–0
7	L	October 22, 1972	4–5	Minnesota Fighting Saints (1972–73)	3–4–0
8	W	October 26, 1972	7–6	New England Whalers (1972–73)	4–4–0
9	L	October 28, 1972	3–4 OT	Los Angeles Sharks (1972–73)	4–5–0
10	W	October 29, 1972	7–2	Alberta Oilers (1972–73)	5–5–0

November

Game	Result	Date	Score	Opponent	Record
11	W	November 2, 1972	4–2	@ Minnesota Fighting Saints (1972–73)	6–5–0
12	W	November 3, 1972	9–6	@ Winnipeg Jets (1972–73)	7–5–0
13	L	November 5, 1972	1–3	@ Winnipeg Jets (1972–73)	7–6–0
14	L	November 7, 1972	2–4	@ Alberta Oilers (1972–73)	7–7–0
15	L	November 8, 1972	1–2	@ Los Angeles Sharks (1972–73)	7–8–0
16	L	November 11, 1972	5–6	@ New England Whalers (1972–73)	7–9–0
17	L	November 15, 1972	4–7	@ Quebec Nordiques (1972–73)	7–10–0
18	W	November 18, 1972	7–1	Quebec Nordiques (1972–73)	8–10–0
19	W	November 19, 1972	5–0	Philadelphia Blazers (1972–73)	9–10–0
20	W	November 22, 1972	3–1	New England Whalers (1972–73)	10–10–0
21	W	November 25, 1972	4–2	Alberta Oilers (1972–73)	11–10–0
22	L	November 26, 1972	2–6	Los Angeles Sharks (1972–73)	11–11–0
23	W	November 29, 1972	7–6	New England Whalers (1972–73)	12–11–0
24	W	November 30, 1972	5–2	Minnesota Fighting Saints (1972–73)	13–11–0

December

Game	Result	Date	Score	Opponent	Record
25	L	December 2, 1972	2–7	Houston Aeros (1972–73)	13–12–0
26	W	December 3, 1972	5–2	Cleveland Crusaders (1972–73)	14–12–0
27	W	December 5, 1972	6–4	@ Houston Aeros (1972–73)	15–12–0
28	L	December 6, 1972	3–4	@ New England Whalers (1972–73)	15–13–0
29	L	December 8, 1972	1–3	@ Philadelphia Blazers (1972–73)	15–14–0
30	L	December 9, 1972	2–4	@ New England Whalers (1972–73)	15–15–0
31	W	December 11, 1972	8–3	Chicago Cougars (1972–73)	16–15–0
32	W	December 13, 1972	9–1	Quebec Nordiques (1972–73)	17–15–0
33	W	December 14, 1972	4–3	@ Ottawa Nationals (1972–73)	18–15–0
34	L	December 17, 1972	3–4	Winnipeg Jets (1972–73)	18–16–0
35	W	December 19, 1972	7–2	@ Philadelphia Blazers (1972–73)	19–16–0
36	L	December 21, 1972	2–6	@ Cleveland Crusaders (1972–73)	19–17–0
37	W	December 22, 1972	7–5	Ottawa Nationals (1972–73)	20–17–0
38	L	December 25, 1972	2–8	New England Whalers (1972–73)	20–18–0
39	W	December 26, 1972	5–2	@ Quebec Nordiques (1972–73)	21–18–0
40	L	December 31, 1972	0–3	New England Whalers (1972–73)	21–19–0

January

Game	Result	Date	Score	Opponent	Record
41	L	January 1, 1973	0–3	Philadelphia Blazers (1972–73)	21–20–0
42	W	January 4, 1973	9–4	Ottawa Nationals (1972–73)	22–20–0
43	L	January 8, 1973	5–6 OT	Quebec Nordiques (1972–73)	22–21–0
44	W	January 10, 1973	4–1	@ Philadelphia Blazers (1972–73)	23–21–0
45	L	January 11, 1973	1–4	@ Ottawa Nationals (1972–73)	23–22–0
46	L	January 13, 1973	3–4	@ New England Whalers (1972–73)	23–23–0
47	T	January 18, 1973	4–4	@ Quebec Nordiques (1972–73)	23–23–1
48	L	January 22, 1973	2–3	Minnesota Fighting Saints (1972–73)	23–24–1
49	L	January 25, 1973	2–9	@ Chicago Cougars (1972–73)	23–25–1
50	W	January 26, 1973	5–4 OT	@ Los Angeles Sharks (1972–73)	24–25–1
51	L	January 28, 1973	2–9	@ Los Angeles Sharks (1972–73)	24–26–1
52	L	January 30, 1973	3–11	@ Alberta Oilers (1972–73)	24–27–1

February

Game	Result	Date	Score	Opponent	Record
53	L	February 1, 1973	5–8	@ Alberta Oilers (1972–73)	24–28–1
54	L	February 3, 1973	2–4	@ Chicago Cougars (1972–73)	24–29–1
55	W	February 4, 1973	5–4	Quebec Nordiques (1972–73)	25–29–1
56	L	February 6, 1973	4–5	@ Minnesota Fighting Saints (1972–73)	25–30–1
57	W	February 8, 1973	3–2	@ Ottawa Nationals (1972–73)	26–30–1
58	L	February 10, 1973	4–8	@ Cleveland Crusaders (1972–73)	26–31–1
59	W	February 11, 1973	3–2	Ottawa Nationals (1972–73)	27–31–1
60	L	February 12, 1973	2–8	@ Cleveland Crusaders (1972–73)	27–32–1
61	L	February 16, 1973	2–9	@ Philadelphia Blazers (1972–73)	27–33–1
62	W	February 21, 1973	5–4	Alberta Oilers (1972–73)	28–33–1
63	W	February 25, 1973	9–5	Cleveland Crusaders (1972–73)	29–33–1

March

Game	Result	Date	Score	Opponent	Record
64	L	March 1, 1973	1–2	@ Ottawa Nationals (1972–73)	29–34–1
65	L	March 3, 1973	3–4	Cleveland Crusaders (1972–73)	29–35–1
66	L	March 4, 1973	2–4	Philadelphia Blazers (1972–73)	29–36–1
67	T	March 5, 1973	4–4	Chicago Cougars (1972–73)	29–36–2
68	W	March 10, 1973	3–2 OT	Winnipeg Jets (1972–73)	30–36–2
69	L	March 11, 1973	1–6	@ Quebec Nordiques (1972–73)	30–37–2
70	W	March 12, 1973	8–7	Chicago Cougars (1972–73)	31–37–2
71	W	March 14, 1973	5–1	Houston Aeros (1972–73)	32–37–2
72	L	March 15, 1973	2–6	Los Angeles Sharks (1972–73)	32–38–2
73	L	March 17, 1973	3–6	@ Chicago Cougars (1972–73)	32–39–2
74	W	March 18, 1973	3–2 OT	@ Houston Aeros (1972–73)	33–39–2
75	L	March 25, 1973	4–8	@ Winnipeg Jets (1972–73)	33–40–2
76	L	March 27, 1973	3–4	@ Minnesota Fighting Saints (1972–73)	33–41–2
77	L	March 29, 1973	3–5	@ Houston Aeros (1972–73)	33–42–2
78	L	March 30, 1973	4–5 OT	@ New England Whalers (1972–73)	33–43–2

Legend: Win (2 points) Loss (0 points) Tie (1 point)

== Player statistics ==
=== Skaters ===
Regular season
Player	Pos	GP	G	A	Pts	PIM	+/-	PPG	SHG	GWG
Ron Ward	C	77	51	67	118	28	0	12	1	5
Bobby Sheehan	C	75	35	53	88	17	0	18	0	5
Wayne Rivers	RW	75	37	40	77	47	0	4	0	4
Gene Peacosh	LW	67	37	34	71	25	0	10	1	3
Norm Ferguson	RW	56	28	40	68	8	0	8	1	5
Ken Block	D	78	5	53	58	43	0	0	1	1
Brian Bradley	LW	78	22	33	55	20	0	1	2	0
Mike Laughton	C	67	16	20	36	44	0	1	0	0
Brian Perry	C	74	13	20	33	30	0	3	1	0
Craig Reichmuth	LW	73	13	14	27	127	0	0	0	0
Bill Speer	D	69	3	23	26	40	0	0	0	0
Hal Willis	D	74	3	21	24	159	0	0	0	0
Bob Jones	LW	56	11	12	23	24	0	0	1	0
Kent Douglas	D	60	3	15	18	74	0	0	0	0
Wally Olds	D	61	5	7	12	4	0	0	0	0
Bob Winograd	D	52	0	12	12	23	0	0	0	0
Jamie Kennedy	RW/C	54	4	6	10	11	0	0	0	0
Garry Peters	C	23	2	7	9	24	0	0	0	0
Brian Morenz	C	30	7	1	8	23	0	1	2	0
Claude Chartre	C	12	2	3	5	0	0	2	0	0
Alton White	RW	13	1	4	5	2	0	0	0	0
Ted Scharf	RW	29	2	2	4	72	0	0	0	0
Bob Brown	D	17	0	4	4	6	0	0	0	0
Jean Gauthier	D	31	2	1	3	21	0	0	0	0
Jarda Krupicka	RW	30	1	2	3	4	0	0	0	0
Pete Donnelly	G	47	0	0	0	2	0	0	0	0
Gary Kurt	G	36	0	0	0	2	0	0	0	0
Blaine Rydman	D	2	0	0	0	4	0	0	0	0
Ian Wilkie	G	5	0	0	0	0	0	0	0	0

=== Goaltending ===
Regular season
Player	MIN	GP	W	L	T	GA	GAA	SO
Pete Donnelly	2606	47	22	19	2	155	3.57	2
Gary Kurt	1881	36	10	21	0	150	4.78	0
Ian Wilkie	253	5	1	3	0	27	6.40	0
Team:	4740	78	33	43	2	332	4.20	2

Note: Pos = Position; GP = Games played; G = Goals; A = Assists; Pts = Points; +/- = plus/minus; PIM = Penalty minutes; PPG = Power-play goals; SHG = Short-handed goals; GWG = Game-winning goals
MIN = Minutes played; W = Wins; L = Losses; T = Ties; GA = Goals-against; GAA = Goals-against average; SO = Shutouts;

== Farm teams ==
Long Island Ducks, Eastern Hockey League

== See also ==
- 1972–73 WHA season
