= 1972–73 Cleveland Crusaders season =

World Hockey Association team season

1972–73 Cleveland Crusaders
- Division: 2nd East
- 1972–73 record: 43–32–3
- Home record: 26–11–2
- Road record: 17–21–1
- Goals for: 287
- Goals against: 239

Team information
- General manager: Chuck Catto (Director of Player Personnel)
- Coach: Bill Needham
- Captain: Paul Shmyr
- Alternate captains: John Hanna; Skip Krake; Wayne Muloin
- Arena: Cleveland Arena
- Average attendance: 5,287 (55.7%)

Team leaders
- Goals: Gary Jarrett (40)
- Assists: Ron Buchanan (44)
- Points: Ron Buchanan (81)
- Penalty minutes: Paul Shmyr (169)
- Wins: Gerry Cheevers (32)
- Goals against average: Gerry Cheevers (2.84)

The 1972–73 Cleveland Crusaders season was the first season of operation of the new Cleveland Crusaders in the new World Hockey Association. The team qualified for the playoffs and won its first series, before losing in the Division semi-final.

== Regular season ==
=== Final standings ===
Eastern Division
	GP	W	L	T	GF	GA	PIM	Pts
New England Whalers	78	46	30	2	318	263	858	94
Cleveland Crusaders	78	43	32	3	287	239	1095	89
Philadelphia Blazers	78	38	40	0	288	305	1260	76
Ottawa Nationals	78	35	39	4	279	301	1067	74
Quebec Nordiques	78	33	40	5	276	313	1354	71
New York Raiders	78	33	43	2	303	334	900	68

== Schedule and results ==
1972–73 regular season
October

Game	Result	Date	Score	Opponent	Record
1	W	October 11, 1972	2–0	Quebec Nordiques (1972–73)	1–0–0
2	W	October 14, 1972	3–2	Alberta Oilers (1972–73)	2–0–0
3	W	October 15, 1972	7–5	@ Ottawa Nationals (1972–73)	3–0–0
4	W	October 17, 1972	4–3 OT	New York Raiders (1972–73)	4–0–0
5	W	October 19, 1972	3–1	@ New York Raiders (1972–73)	5–0–0
6	L	October 21, 1972	3–5	Ottawa Nationals (1972–73)	5–1–0
7	L	October 24, 1972	2–3 OT	New England Whalers (1972–73)	5–2–0
8	W	October 25, 1972	8–2	@ Philadelphia Blazers (1972–73)	6–2–0
9	W	October 27, 1972	6–0	Alberta Oilers (1972–73)	7–2–0
10	T	October 29, 1972	2–2	@ Quebec Nordiques (1972–73)	7–2–1

November

Game	Result	Date	Score	Opponent	Record
11	L	November 1, 1972	5–7	Philadelphia Blazers (1972–73)	7–3–1
12	W	November 4, 1972	5–3	Quebec Nordiques (1972–73)	8–3–1
13	W	November 11, 1972	4–1	@ Chicago Cougars (1972–73)	9–3–1
14	W	November 12, 1972	3–1	@ Alberta Oilers (1972–73)	10–3–1
15	L	November 14, 1972	3–5	@ Minnesota Fighting Saints (1972–73)	10–4–1
16	W	November 16, 1972	6–3	Ottawa Nationals (1972–73)	11–4–1
17	W	November 17, 1972	3–0	New England Whalers (1972–73)	12–4–1
18	L	November 19, 1972	2–4	@ Houston Aeros (1972–73)	12–5–1
19	W	November 21, 1972	5–2	@ Los Angeles Sharks (1972–73)	13–5–1
20	W	November 24, 1972	3–2 OT	Los Angeles Sharks (1972–73)	14–5–1
21	L	November 25, 1972	1–3	Houston Aeros (1972–73)	14–6–1
22	L	November 27, 1972	0–3	@ New England Whalers (1972–73)	14–7–1
23	L	November 28, 1972	1–3	Houston Aeros (1972–73)	14–8–1
24	L	November 30, 1972	2–3	@ Ottawa Nationals (1972–73)	14–9–1

December

Game	Result	Date	Score	Opponent	Record
25	W	December 2, 1972	8–2	Philadelphia Blazers (1972–73)	15–9–1
26	L	December 3, 1972	2–5	@ New York Raiders (1972–73)	15–10–1
27	W	December 5, 1972	4–3 OT	@ Philadelphia Blazers (1972–73)	16–10–1
28	W	December 7, 1972	3–1	@ Quebec Nordiques (1972–73)	17–10–1
29	L	December 9, 1972	2–3 OT	Winnipeg Jets (1972–73)	17–11–1
30	L	December 10, 1972	3–4 OT	@ Minnesota Fighting Saints (1972–73)	17–12–1
31	W	December 15, 1972	6–3	Quebec Nordiques (1972–73)	18–12–1
32	L	December 17, 1972	2–3	@ Quebec Nordiques (1972–73)	18–13–1
33	L	December 19, 1972	1–6	@ Chicago Cougars (1972–73)	18–14–1
34	W	December 21, 1972	6–2	New York Raiders (1972–73)	19–14–1
35	W	December 23, 1972	3–1	Minnesota Fighting Saints (1972–73)	20–14–1
36	W	December 25, 1972	8–0	Philadelphia Blazers (1972–73)	21–14–1
37	W	December 29, 1972	5–3	Quebec Nordiques (1972–73)	22–14–1
38	W	December 30, 1972	4–3 OT	Houston Aeros (1972–73)	23–14–1

January

Game	Result	Date	Score	Opponent	Record
39	W	January 11, 1973	4–3	@ Minnesota Fighting Saints (1972–73)	24–14–1
40	L	January 12, 1973	3–5	@ Winnipeg Jets (1972–73)	24–15–1
41	L	January 14, 1973	1–3	@ Winnipeg Jets (1972–73)	24–16–1
42	W	January 16, 1973	4–3	@ Philadelphia Blazers (1972–73)	25–16–1
43	W	January 17, 1973	5–0	@ Houston Aeros (1972–73)	26–16–1
44	W	January 19, 1973	4–1	@ Los Angeles Sharks (1972–73)	27–16–1
45	L	January 21, 1973	2–3	@ Los Angeles Sharks (1972–73)	27–17–1
46	W	January 23, 1973	5–4 OT	Winnipeg Jets (1972–73)	28–17–1
47	L	January 25, 1973	4–7	Philadelphia Blazers (1972–73)	28–18–1
48	W	January 27, 1973	2–1	@ Chicago Cougars (1972–73)	29–18–1
49	W	January 29, 1973	3–2	New England Whalers (1972–73)	30–18–1
50	L	January 31, 1973	1–4	@ New England Whalers (1972–73)	30–19–1

February

Game	Result	Date	Score	Opponent	Record
51	T	February 1, 1973	2–2	Ottawa Nationals (1972–73)	30–19–2
52	W	February 2, 1973	5–3	Philadelphia Blazers (1972–73)	31–19–2
53	W	February 4, 1973	3–2	@ Ottawa Nationals (1972–73)	32–19–2
54	W	February 5, 1973	7–5	Chicago Cougars (1972–73)	33–19–2
55	W	February 10, 1973	8–4	New York Raiders (1972–73)	34–19–2
56	L	February 11, 1973	1–6	@ Philadelphia Blazers (1972–73)	34–20–2
57	W	February 12, 1973	8–2	New York Raiders (1972–73)	35–20–2
58	L	February 14, 1973	5–6	@ Philadelphia Blazers (1972–73)	35–21–2
59	L	February 17, 1973	3–7	Minnesota Fighting Saints (1972–73)	35–22–2
60	W	February 20, 1973	5–4	Alberta Oilers (1972–73)	36–22–2
61	L	February 24, 1973	2–5	Chicago Cougars (1972–73)	36–23–2
62	L	February 25, 1973	5–9	@ New York Raiders (1972–73)	36–24–2
63	L	February 27, 1973	1–2	@ Ottawa Nationals (1972–73)	36–25–2

March

Game	Result	Date	Score	Opponent	Record
64	W	March 3, 1973	4–3	@ New York Raiders (1972–73)	37–25–2
65	L	March 7, 1973	0–1 OT	@ New England Whalers (1972–73)	37–26–2
66	L	March 9, 1973	4–5	@ New England Whalers (1972–73)	37–27–2
67	W	March 11, 1973	11–2	@ Winnipeg Jets (1972–73)	38–27–2
68	L	March 13, 1973	2–4	@ Alberta Oilers (1972–73)	38–28–2
69	L	March 14, 1973	2–4	@ Alberta Oilers (1972–73)	38–29–2
70	L	March 17, 1973	0–2	Los Angeles Sharks (1972–73)	38–30–2
71	T	March 19, 1973	5–5	Los Angeles Sharks (1972–73)	38–30–3
72	L	March 20, 1973	1–4	@ Quebec Nordiques (1972–73)	38–31–3
73	L	March 24, 1973	1–2 OT	Minnesota Fighting Saints (1972–73)	38–32–3
74	W	March 25, 1973	4–2	@ Houston Aeros (1972–73)	39–32–3
75	W	March 26, 1973	7–5	New England Whalers (1972–73)	40–32–3
76	W	March 30, 1973	4–2	Winnipeg Jets (1972–73)	41–32–3
77	W	March 31, 1973	4–2	Ottawa Nationals (1972–73)	42–32–3

April

Game	Result	Date	Score	Opponent	Record
78	W	April 1, 1973	5–1	Chicago Cougars (1972–73)	43–32–3

Legend: Win (2 points) Loss (0 points) Tie (1 point)

== Playoffs ==
1973 Avco Cup playoffs
Quarterfinals vs. Philadelphia Blazers – Crusaders win 4–0

Game	Date	Visitor	Score	Home	Series
1	April 4	Philadelphia Blazers	2–3 OT	Cleveland Crusaders	1–0
2	April 7	Philadelphia Blazers	7–1	Cleveland Crusaders	2–0
3	April 8	Cleveland Crusaders	3–1	Philadelphia Blazers	3–0
4	April 11	Cleveland Crusaders	6–2	Philadelphia Blazers	4–0

Semifinals vs. New England Whalers – Whalers win 4–1

Game	Date	Visitor	Score	Home	Series
1	April 18	Cleveland Crusaders	2 – 3	New England Whalers	0–1
2	April 19	Cleveland Crusaders	2 – 3	New England Whalers	0–2
3	April 21	New England Whalers	5 – 4	Cleveland Crusaders	0–3
4	April 22	New England Whalers	2 – 5	Cleveland Crusaders	1–3
5	April 26	Cleveland Crusaders	1 – 3	New England Whalers	1–4

Legend: Win Loss

== Player statistics ==
=== Players ===
Regular season
Player	Position	GP	G	A	Pts	PIM	+/-	PPG	SHG	GWG
Ron Buchanan	C	75	37	44	81	20	0	6	0	5
Gary Jarrett	LW	77	40	39	79	79	0	8	0	7
Jim Wiste	C	70	28	43	71	24	0	4	0	3
Gerry Pinder	LW	78	30	36	66	121	0	7	3	3
Paul Andrea	RW	66	21	30	51	12	0	7	0	0
Joe Hardy	C	72	17	33	50	80	0	1	0	0
Paul Shmyr	D	73	5	43	48	169	0	0	1	0
Ray Clearwater	D	78	11	36	47	41	0	1	0	0
Grant Erickson	LW	77	15	29	44	23	0	2	1	0
Rich Pumple	LW	77	21	20	41	45	0	5	0	0
Ted Hodgson	RW	74	15	23	38	93	0	2	0	0
Doug Brindley	LW/C	73	15	11	26	6	0	2	0	0
John Hanna	D	66	6	20	26	68	0	3	0	0
Skip Krake	C	26	9	10	19	61	0	2	0	0
Bill Horton	D	74	2	17	19	55	0	0	0	0
Bob Dillabough	C	72	8	8	16	8	0	1	6	0
Wayne Muloin	D	67	2	13	15	62	0	0	0	0
Ralph Hopiavuori	D	29	4	5	9	44	0	0	0	0
Jim McMasters	D	74	1	7	8	37	0	0	0	0
Al Rycroft	RW	7	0	2	2	0	0	0	0	0
Gerry Cheevers	G	52	0	1	1	30	0	0	0	0
Bob Whidden	G	26	0	0	0	5	0	0	0	0

Avco Cup playoffs
Player	Position	GP	G	A	Pts	PIM	PPG	SHG	GWG
Gary Jarrett	LW	9	8	3	11	19	3	0	1
Jim Wiste	C	9	3	8	11	13	1	0	1
Gerry Pinder	LW	9	2	9	11	30	1	0	0
Ron Buchanan	C	9	7	3	10	0	1	0	1
Paul Andrea	RW	9	2	8	10	2	1	0	0
Rich Pumple	LW	9	3	5	8	11	1	0	0
Ted Hodgson	RW	9	1	3	4	13	1	0	0
Wayne Muloin	D	9	1	3	4	14	0	0	0
Paul Shmyr	D	8	1	3	4	19	0	0	0
Grant Erickson	LW	9	2	1	3	2	0	0	1
Ray Clearwater	D	9	1	2	3	8	0	0	0
Skip Krake	C	9	1	2	3	27	0	0	1
Joe Hardy	C	7	0	2	2	0	0	0	0
Bob Dillabough	C	9	1	0	1	0	0	1	0
Ralph Hopiavuori	D	8	0	1	1	6	0	0	0
Bill Horton	D	9	0	1	1	10	0	0	0
Jim McMasters	D	9	0	1	1	6	0	0	0
Blake Ball	D	2	0	0	0	0	0	0	0
Doug Brindley	LW/C	9	0	0	0	6	0	0	0
Gerry Cheevers	G	9	0	0	0	4	0	0	0

=== Goaltending ===
Player	MIN	GP	W	L	T	GA	GAA	SO
Gerry Cheevers	3144	52	32	20	0	149	2.84	5
Bob Whidden	1609	26	11	12	3	88	3.28	0
Team:	4753	78	43	32	3	237	2.99	5

Playoffs

Player	MIN	GP	W	L	GA	GAA
Gerry Cheevers	548	9	5	4	22	2.41
Team:	548	9	5	4	22	2.41

Note: Pos = Position; GP = Games played; G = Goals; A = Assists; Pts = Points; +/- = plus/minus; PIM = Penalty minutes; PPG = Power-play goals; SHG = Short-handed goals; GWG = Game-winning goals
MIN = Minutes played; W = Wins; L = Losses; T = Ties; GA = Goals-against; GAA = Goals-against average; SO = Shutouts;

== See also ==
- 1972–73 WHA season
