= 1972–73 New England Whalers season =

World Hockey Association team season

1972–73 New England Whalers
- Avco Cup champions
- Division: 1st East
- 1972–73 record: 46–30–2
- Home record: 30–8–1
- Road record: 16–22–1
- Goals for: 318
- Goals against: 263

Team information
- General manager: Jack Kelley
- Coach: Jack Kelley
- Captain: Ted Green
- Alternate captains: Tommy Williams; Jim Dorey; Larry Pleau
- Arena: Boston Arena (18 games); Boston Garden (21 games and playoffs)
- Average attendance: 6,981 (67.2%)

Team leaders
- Goals: Tom Webster (53)
- Assists: Terry Caffery (61)
- Points: Tom Webster (103)
- Penalty minutes: Brad Selwood (114)
- Wins: Al Smith (31)
- Goals against average: Al Smith (3.17)

The 1972–73 New England Whalers season was the Whalers' first season (based in Boston). The Whalers were competitive from the start, placing first in the Eastern Division to qualify for the playoffs. They then won three playoff series to become the first winner of the Avco World Trophy.

== Regular season ==
=== Final standings ===
Eastern Division
	GP	W	L	T	GF	GA	PIM	Pts
New England Whalers	78	46	30	2	318	263	858	94
Cleveland Crusaders	78	43	32	3	287	239	1095	89
Philadelphia Blazers	78	38	40	0	288	305	1260	76
Ottawa Nationals	78	35	39	4	279	301	1067	74
Quebec Nordiques	78	33	40	5	276	313	1354	71
New York Raiders	78	33	43	2	303	334	900	68

== Schedule and results ==
1972–73 regular season
October: 5–4–0 (home: 3–2–0; road: 2–2–0)

Game	Date	Visitor	Score	Home	OT	Record	Pts
1	October 12	Philadelphia	3–4	New England		1–0–0	2
2	October 16	Chicago	1–4	New England		2–0–0	4
3	October 18	New England	4–1	Houston		3–0–0	6
4	October 19	Quebec	4–3	New England		3–1–0	6
5	October 21	New England	4–6	Quebec		3–2–0	6
6	October 23	Minnesota	1–5	New England		4–2–0	8
7	October 24	New England	3–2	Cleveland	OT	5–2–0	10
8	October 26	New England	6–7	New York		5–3–0	10
9	October 28	Alberta	4–1	New England		5–4–0	10

November: 8–4–1 (home: 8–0–1; road: 0–4–0)

Game	Date	Visitor	Score	Home	OT	Record	Pts
10	November 1	Chicago	2–4	New England		6–4–0	12
11	November 4	Philadelphia	4–8	New England		7–4–0	14
12	November 6	Winnipeg	2–6	New England		8–4–0	16
13	November 11	New York	5–6	New England		9–4–0	18
14	November 13	Houston	4–4	New England	TIE	9–4–1	19
15	November 17	New England	0–3	Cleveland		9–5–1	19
16	November 18	Ottawa	2–3	New England		10–5–1	21
17	November 20	Ottawa	5–7	New England		11–5–1	23
18	November 22	New England	1–3	New York		11–6–1	23
19	November 24	Alberta	2–7	New England		12–6–1	25
20	November 26	New England	1–3	Minnesota		12–7–1	25
21	November 27	Cleveland	0–3	New England		13–7–1	27
22	November 29	New England	6–7	New York		13–8–1	27

December: 11–7–0 (home: 5–3–0; road: 6–4–0)

Game	Date	Visitor	Score	Home	OT	Record	Pts
23	December 1	New England	3–5	Philadelphia		13–9–1	27
24	December 2	Quebec	2–7	New England		14–9–1	29
25	December 4	Ottawa	2–7	New England		15–9–1	31
26	December 6	New York	3–4	New England		16–9–1	33
27	December 7	New England	4–2	Ottawa		17–9–1	35
28	December 9	New York	2–4	New England		18–9–1	37
29	December 11	Winnipeg	3–4	New England		19–9–1	39
30	December 13	New England	3–6	Chicago		19–10–1	39
31	December 14	New England	5–2	Los Angeles		20–10–1	41
32	December 16	New England	10–6	Philadelphia		21–10–1	43
33	December 17	Philadelphia	6–3	New England		21–11–1	43
34	December 19	New England	5–7	New York		21–12–1	43
35	December 21	New England	4–5	Quebec		21–13–1	43
36	December 24	Los Angeles	5–3	New England		21–14–1	43
37	December 25	New England	8–2	New York		22–14–1	45
38	December 28	New England	5–3	Quebec		23–14–1	47
39	December 29	New York	4–2	New England		23–15–1	47
40	December 31	New England	3–0	New York		24–15–1	49

January: 6–4–0 (home: 3–1–0; road: 3–3–0)

Game	Date	Visitor	Score	Home	OT	Record	Pts
41	January 9	New England	5–7	Houston		24–16–1	49
42	January 13	New York	3–4	New England		25–16–1	51
43	January 17	New England	4–2	Chicago		26–16–1	53
44	January 19	New England	2–6	Winnipeg		26–17–1	53
45	January 21	New England	7–2	Winnipeg		27–17–1	55
46	January 24	Winnipeg	1–6	New England		28–17–1	57
47	January 25	New England	4–2	Ottawa		29–17–1	59
48	January 27	Quebec	3–1	New England		29–18–1	59
49	January 29	New England	2–3	Cleveland		29–19–1	59
50	January 31	Cleveland	1–4	New England		30–19–1	61

February: 5–6–1 (home: 2–1–0; road: 3–5–1)

Game	Date	Visitor	Score	Home	OT	Record	Pts
51	February 1	New England	5–4	Houston	OT	31–19–1	63
52	February 2	New England	1–3	Los Angeles		31–20–1	63
53	February 4	New England	3–4	Los Angeles		31–21–1	63
54	February 6	New England	4–2	Alberta		32–21–1	65
55	February 7	New England	1–3	Alberta		32–22–1	65
56	February 9	Ottawa	7–4	New England		32–23–1	65
57	February 11	New England	2–2	Quebec	TIE	32–23–2	66
58	February 13	New England	4–5	Philadelphia		32–24–2	66
59	February 15	Los Angeles	5–6	New England		33–24–2	68
60	February 17	New England	6–4	Quebec		34–24–2	70
61	February 20	New England	2–4	Philadelphia		34–25–2	70
62	February 23	Alberta	2–4	New England		35–25–2	72

March: 10–5–0 (home: 8–1–0; road: 2–4–0)

Game	Date	Visitor	Score	Home	OT	Record	Pts
63	March 4	New England	2–4	Minnesota		35–26–2	72
64	March 7	Cleveland	0–1	New England	OT	36–26–2	74
65	March 9	Cleveland	4–5	New England		37–26–2	76
66	March 10	Minnesota	1–3	New England		38–26–2	78
67	March 13	New England	4–3	Chicago	OT	39–26–2	80
68	March 14	New England	7–5	Winnipeg		40–21–2	82
69	March 16	Minnesota	4–7	New England		41–26–2	84
70	March 17	Philadelphia	0–4	New England		42–26–2	86
71	March 20	Los Angeles	1–4	New England		43–26–2	88
72	March 22	New England	2–4	Ottawa		43–27–2	88
73	March 23	Chicago	1–3	New England		44–27–2	90
74	March 26	New England	5–7	Cleveland		44–28–2	90
75	March 27	Houston	6–1	New England		44–29–2	90
76	March 29	New England	2–5	Ottawa		44–30–2	90
77	March 30	New York	4–5	New England	OT	45–30–2	92

April: 1–0–0 (home: 1–0–0; road: 0–0–0)

Game	Date	Visitor	Score	Home	OT	Record	Pts
78	April 1	Quebec	3–8	New England		46–30–2	94

Legend: Win (2 points) Loss (0 points) Tie (1 point)

== Playoffs ==
1973 Avco Cup playoffs
Eastern Division Semifinals vs. Ottawa Nationals – Whalers win 4–1

Game	Date	Visitor	Score	Home	Series
1	April 7	Ottawa Nationals	3–6	New England Whalers	1–0
2	April 8	Ottawa Nationals	3 – 4 OT	New England Whalers	2–0
3	April 10	New England Whalers	2–4	Ottawa Nationals	2–1
4	April 12	New England Whalers	7 – 3 OT	Ottawa Nationals	3–1
5	April 14	Ottawa Nationals	4–5	New England Whalers	4–1

Eastern Division Finals vs. Cleveland Crusaders – Whalers win 4–1

Game	Date	Visitor	Score	Home	Series
1	April 18	Cleveland Crusaders	2–3	New England Whalers	1–0
2	April 19	Cleveland Crusaders	2–3	New England Whalers	2–0
3	April 21	New England Whalers	5–4	Cleveland Crusaders	3–0
4	April 22	New England Whalers	2–5	Cleveland Crusaders	3–1
5	April 26	Cleveland Crusaders	1–3	New England Whalers	4–1

Avco World Trophy Finals vs. Winnipeg Jets – Whalers win 4–1

Game	Date	Visitor	Score	Home	Series
1	April 29	Winnipeg Jets	2–7	New England Whalers	1–0
2	May 2	New England Whalers	7–4	Winnipeg Jets	2–0
3	May 3	New England Whalers	3–4	Winnipeg Jets	2–1
4	May 5	Winnipeg Jets	2–4	New England Whalers	3–1
5	May 6	Winnipeg Jets	6–9	New England Whalers	4–1

Legend: Win Loss

== Player statistics ==
=== Regular season ===
Skaters

Regular season
Player	GP	G	A	Pts	PIM
Tom Webster	77	53	50	103	89
Terry Caffery	74	39	61	100	14
Larry Pleau	78	39	48	87	42
Tim Sheehy	78	33	38	71	30
Jim Dorey	75	7	56	63	95
John French	74	24	35	59	43
Ted Green	78	16	30	46	47
Kevin Ahearn	78	20	22	42	18
Brit Selby	65	13	29	42	48
John Danby	77	14	23	37	10
Brad Selwood	75	13	21	34	114
Tommy Williams	69	10	21	31	14
Rick Ley	76	3	27	30	108
Tom Earl	77	10	13	23	4
Mike Hyndman	59	4	14	18	21
Paul Hurley	78	3	15	18	58
Dick Sarrazin	35	4	7	11	0
Mike Byers	19	6	4	10	4
John Cunniff	33	3	5	8	16
Guy Smith	22	3	3	6	6
Ric Jordan	34	1	5	6	12
Bruce Landon	30	0	1	1	8
Al Smith	51	0	1	1	39
Total	78	318	529	847	840

Goaltenders

Regular Season
Player	GP	W	L	T	GA	GAA	SO	MIN
Al Smith	51	31	19	1	162	3.18	3	3,059
Bruce Landon	30	15	11	1	100	3.59	1	1,671
Total	78	46	30	2	262	3.32	4	4,730

=== Playoffs ===
Playoffs
Player	GP	G	A	Pts	PIM
Tom Webster	15	12	14	26	6
Tim Sheehy	15	9	14	23	13
Larry Pleau	15	12	7	19	15
Jim Dorey	15	3	16	19	41
Tommy Williams	15	6	11	17	2
John French	15	3	11	14	2
Mike Byers	12	6	5	11	6
Rick Ley	15	3	7	10	24
Terry Caffery	8	3	7	10	0
Brad Selwood	15	3	5	8	22
Paul Hurley	15	0	7	7	14
Brit Selby	13	3	4	7	13
Ted Green	12	1	5	6	25
Tommy Earl	15	2	3	5	10
Kevin Ahearn	14	1	2	3	9
John Cunniff	13	1	1	2	2
Guy Smith	11	2	0	2	4
Al Smith	15	0	1	1	12
Ric Jordan	4	0	0	0	0
John Danby	8	0	0	0	0
Total	15	70	120	190	220

Goaltenders

Playoffs
Player	GP	W	L	SH	SV	SO
Al Smith	15	12	3	430	381	0
Total	15	12	3	430	381	0

== Awards and records ==
- Terry Caffery, Lou Kaplan Trophy (Rookie of the Year)
- Jack Kelley, Howard Baldwin Trophy (Coach of the Year)
- Tom Webster, WHA All-Star Team (Second Team, RW)
- Jim Dorey, WHA All-Star Team (Second Team, D)

=== 1973 WHA All-Star Game (January 6, 1973) ===
- Al Smith
- Rick Ley
- Jim Dorey
- Larry Pleau
- Terry Caffery
- Tom Webster

== See also ==
- 1972–73 WHA season
