= Ron Riley (ice hockey) =

Canadian ice hockey player

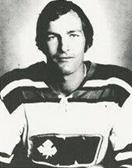
- Riley in 1972 photo
- Born: July 20, 1948 (age 77) Montreal, Quebec, Canada
- Height: 6 ft 0 in (183 cm)
- Weight: 190 lb (86 kg; 13 st 8 lb)
- Position: Left wing
- Played for: WHA; Ottawa Nationals; EHL; Clinton Comets
- NHL draft: Undrafted
- Playing career: 1972–1975

Ron Riley (born July 20, 1948) is a Canadian former professional ice hockey player.

During the 1972–73 season, Riley played 22 games in the World Hockey Association with the Ottawa Nationals.

== Career statistics ==
=== Regular season and playoffs ===
			Regular season					Playoffs
Season	Team	League	GP	G	A	Pts	PIM	GP	G	A	Pts	PIM
1968–69	Belleville Mohawks	OHASr	37	11	14	25	8	—	—	—	—	—
1970–71	Loyola College	CIAU	––	11	11	22	0	—	—	—	—	—
1972–73	Clinton Comets	EHL	37	21	25	46	4	—	—	—	—	—
1972–73	Ottawa Nationals	WHA	22	0	5	5	2	2	0	0	0	0
1973–74	Belleville Eagles	OHASr	25	6	12	18	8	—	—	—	—	—
1974–75	Napanee Comets	OHASr	29	8	8	16	6	—	—	—	—	—
WHA totals			22	0	5	5	2	2	0	0	0	0
