= Steve Cuddie =

Canadian ice hockey player

- Born: June 18, 1950 (age 75) Toronto, Ontario, Canada
- Height: 5 ft 10 in (178 cm)
- Weight: 200 lb (91 kg; 14 st 4 lb)
- Position: Defence
- Shot: Right
- Played for: Winnipeg Jets; Toronto Toros
- NHL draft: 29th overall, 1970; Buffalo Sabres
- Playing career: 1970–1975

Steve Cuddie (born June 18, 1950) is a Canadian former professional ice hockey defenceman who played 221 games in the World Hockey Association for the Winnipeg Jets and Toronto Toros.

== Career statistics ==
			Regular season					Playoffs
Season	Team	League	GP	G	A	Pts	PIM	GP	G	A	Pts	PIM
1967–68	York Steel	MetJBHL	14	0	2	2	—	—	—	—	—	—
1967–68	Toronto Marlboros	OHA-Jr.	3	0	0	0	4	—	—	—	—	—
1968–69	Toronto Marlboros	OHA-Jr.	49	1	9	10	145	—	—	—	—	—
1969–70	Toronto Marlboros	OHA-Jr.	38	1	7	8	89	—	—	—	—	—
1970–71	Salt Lake Golden Eagles	WHL-Sr.	72	3	11	14	169	—	—	—	—	—
1971–72	Cincinnati Swords	AHL	57	2	1	3	64	8	0	0	0	6
1972–73	Winnipeg Jets	WHA	77	7	13	20	121	12	0	1	1	10
1973–74	Toronto Toros	WHA	74	5	18	23	65	8	1	4	5	14
1974–75	Toronto Toros	WHA	70	5	16	21	49	6	0	4	4	8
WHA totals			221	17	47	64	235	26	1	9	10	32
