= Charles Catto =

Canadian ice hockey executive

Charles Catto (born 1934 in Montreal, Quebec, Canada – March 17, 2006) was director of player personnel of the Cleveland Crusaders ice hockey team during the 1972–73 season and general manager of the St. Louis Blues ice hockey team from May 7, 1973, to May 1974.
