= Bill Hughes (ice hockey) =

Canadian ice hockey player

- Born: November 7, 1947 (age 78) Kirkland Lake, Ontario, Canada
- Height: 6 ft 1 in (185 cm)
- Weight: 185 lb (84 kg; 13 st 3 lb)
- Position: Goaltender
- Caught: Left
- Played for: WHA; Houston Aeros; IHL; Muskegon Mohawks; CHL; Fort Worth Texans
- NHL draft: Undrafted
- Playing career: 1972–1978

William John Martin Hughes (born November 7, 1947) is a Canadian former professional ice hockey goaltender.

During the 1972–73 season Hughes played three games in the World Hockey Association with the Houston Aeros.

== Career statistics ==
=== Regular season and playoffs ===
			Regular season									Playoffs
Season	Team	League	GP	W	L	T	MIN	GA	SO	GAA	SV%	GP	W	L	MIN	GA	SO	GAA	SV%
1967–68	Michigan Tech	WCHA	17	Statistics Unavailable
1968–69	Hamilton Red Wings	OHA	25	Statistics Unavailable
1971–72	Reno Aces	Ind	0	Statistics Unavailable
1972–73	Houston Aeros	WHA	3	0	1	1	170	11	0	3.88	.875	—	—	—	—	—	—	—	—
1973–74	Muskegon Mohawks	IHL	70	—	—	—	3987	199	4	2.99	—	3	—	—	—	—	—	—	—
1974–75	Fort Worth Texans	CHL	57	17	26	10	3127	213	1	4.09	—	—	—	—	—	—	—	—	—
1975–76	Fort Worth Texans	CHL	52	21	22	8	3075	170	3	3.32	—	—	—	—	—	—	—	—	—
1976–77	Fort Worth Texans	CHL	41	22	14	2	2357	130	2	3.31	.890	6	—	—	—	—	—	—	—
1977–78	Fort Worth Texans	CHL	24	10	11	0	1183	79	0	4.01	.853	—	—	—	—	—	—	—	—
WHA totals			3	0	1	1	170	11	0	3.88	.875	—	—	—	—	—	—	—	—

== Awards and honours ==
Award	Year
James Norris Memorial Trophy - IHL Fewest Goals Against	1973–74
