= Pete Donnelly (ice hockey) =

American ice hockey player (born 1948)

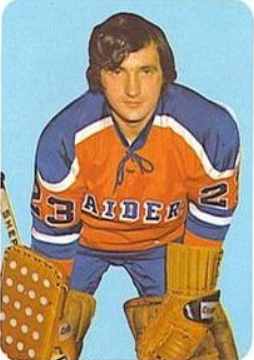
- Born: June 14, 1948 (age 77) Detroit, Michigan, U.S.
- Position: Goaltender
- Played for: Quebec Aces; New York Raiders; Quebec Nordiques; Vancouver Blazers
- Playing career: 1970–1978

Peter George Donnelly (born June 14, 1948) is an American retired professional ice hockey goaltender. He played professionally for several teams including the New York Raiders, Quebec Nordiques and Vancouver Blazers of the World Hockey Association (WHA).

== Early life ==
Donnelly was born in Detroit. He played junior hockey with the Quebec A's, Ottawa 67's, and Kitchener Rangers.

== Career ==
Donnelly joined the Quebec Aces of the American Hockey League (AHL) in 1970. He was selected by the New York Raiders in the 1972 selection draft and he joined the Raiders that season, playing 47 games. In the off-season, he was traded to the Vancouver Blazers, where he played one season before playing with the minor Tulsa Oilers in the 1974–75 season. He joined the Quebec Nordiques organization in the off-season, and he played with their NAHL affiliate in Maine for the season, with a four-game callup with the Quebec club. He played a final season with the Long Beach Sharks/Rockets of the Pacific Hockey League in the 1977–78 campaign before retiring from professional ice hockey.

== Career statistics ==
=== Regular season and playoffs ===
			Regular season									Playoffs
Season	Team	League	GP	W	L	T	MIN	GA	SO	GAA	SV%	GP	W	L	MIN	GA	SO	GAA	SV%
1967–68	Kitchener Rangers	OHA	20	Statistics Unavailable
1967–68	Ottawa 67's	OHA	Statistics Unavailable
1970–71	Quebec Aces	AHL	1	–	–	–	40	1	0	0	1.50		–	–	–	–	–	–	–
1971–72	Jersey Devils	EHL	Statistics Unavailable
1971–72	New Haven Blades	EHL	—	—	—	—	—	—	—	—	—	2	—	—	—	—	—	—	—
1972–73	New York Raiders	WHA	47	22	19	2	2606	155	2	3.56	.883	–	–	–	–	–	–	–	–
1973–74	Roanoke Valley Rebels	SHL	5	5	0	0	300	9	0	1.80	.941	–	–	–	–	–	–	–	–
1973–74	Vancouver Blazers	WHA	49	22	24	0	2824	179	3	3.80	.883	–	–	–	–	–	–	–	–
1974–75	Tulsa Oilers	CHL	22	8	10	4	1265	70	0	3.32		1	–	–	–	–	–	–	–
1975–76	Quebec Nordiques	WHA	4	0	1	0	129	10	0	4.65	.846	–	–	–	–	–	–	–	–
1975–76	Maine Nordiques	NAHL	41	12	27	0	2383	222	0	5.59		4	–	–	–	–	–	–	–
1977–78	Long Beach Sharks/Rockets	PHL	32	Statistics Unavailable
WHA totals			100	44	44	2	5559	344	5	3.71	.882	–	–	–	–	–	–	–	–
