= Dick Paradise =

American ice hockey player

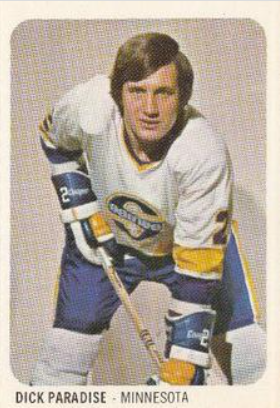
- Paradise in 1973 card
- Born: April 21, 1945 (age 81) Saint Paul, Minnesota, USA
- Height: 6 ft 0 in (183 cm)
- Weight: 190 lb (86 kg; 13 st 8 lb)
- Position: Defense
- Shot: Left
- Played for: Minnesota Fighting Saints
- Playing career: 1968–1974

Dick Paradise (April 21, 1945) is a retired American ice hockey player who played 144 games in the World Hockey Association for the Minnesota Fighting Saints.

== Career statistics ==
			Regular season					Playoffs
Season	Team	League	GP	G	A	Pts	PIM	GP	G	A	Pts	PIM
1968–69	Johnstown Jets	EHL	72	8	31	39	244	3	0	1	1	41
1968–69	Buffalo Bisons	AHL	2	0	1	1	2	—	—	—	—	—
1968–69	Omaha Knights	CHL	—	—	—	—	—	6	0	3	3	25
1969–70	Omaha Knights	CHL	25	0	4	4	49	—	—	—	—	—
1969–70	Buffalo Bisons	AHL	22	2	3	5	37	14	0	2	2	10
1970–71	Seattle Totems	WHL	67	3	12	15	75	—	—	—	—	—
1970–71	Omaha Knights	CHL	3	0	0	0	0	—	—	—	—	—
1971–72	Tidewater Wings	AHL	51	3	1	4	80	—	—	—	—	—
1972–73	Minnesota Fighting Saints	WHA	77	3	15	18	189	6	0	1	1	2
1973–74	Minnesota Fighting Saints	WHA	67	2	7	9	71	7	0	0	0	6
WHA totals			144	5	22	27	260	13	0	1	1	8

== Awards and honors ==
Award	Year
All-WCHA Second Team	1967–68
