= Jacques Lemelin =

Canadian ice hockey player (born 1949)

- Born: November 11, 1949 (age 76) Montréal, Quebec, Canada
- Height: 6 ft 4 in (193 cm)
- Weight: 235 lb (107 kg; 16 st 11 lb)
- Position: Goaltender
- Caught: Right
- Played for: Quebec Nordiques
- NHL draft: Undrafted
- Playing career: 1972–1974

Jacques Lemelin (born November 11, 1949) is a Canadian former professional ice hockey goaltender.

During the 1972–73 season, Lemelin played nine games in the World Hockey Association with the Quebec Nordiques.

== Career statistics ==
=== Regular season and playoffs ===
			Regular season									Playoffs
Season	Team	League	GP	W	L	T	MIN	GA	SO	GAA	SV%	GP	W	L	MIN	GA	SO	GAA	SV%
1972–73	Quebec Nordiques	WHA	9	3	4	0	434	29	0	4.00	.854	—	—	—	—	—	—	—	—
1973-74	Maine Nordiques	NAHL	40	—	—	—	2273	172	0	4.54	—	4	—	—	—	—	—	—	—
WHA totals			9	3	4	0	434	29	0	4.00	.854	—	—	—	—	—	—	—	—
