= 1972–73 Quebec Nordiques season =

World Hockey Association team season

1972–73 Quebec Nordiques
- Division: 5th Eastern
- 1972–73 record: 33–40–5
- Home record: 22–12–5
- Road record: 11–28–0
- Goals for: 276
- Goals against: 313

Team information
- General manager: Marius Fortier
- Coach: Maurice Richard (1–1–0); Maurice Filion (32–39–5)
- Captain: J. C. Tremblay
- Alternate captains: Jean-Guy Gendron; Mike Harvey; Rene LeClerc
- Arena: Quebec Coliseum
- Average attendance: 6,923 (69.2%)

Team leaders
- Goals: Alain Caron (36)
- Assists: J. C. Tremblay (75)
- Points: J. C. Tremblay (89)
- Penalty minutes: Pierre Roy (169)
- Wins: Serge Aubry (22)
- Goals against average: Serge Aubry (3.59)

The 1972–73 Quebec Nordiques season was the Nordiques' first season, as they were one of the original teams in the newly created WHA. The Nordiques franchise was originally awarded to a group in San Francisco, California, and was named the San Francisco Sharks, however, funding collapsed prior to the start of the season, and the WHA sold the organization to a Quebec City group led by Marcel Aubut and Paul Racine. They named the club the Nordiques due to the northern location of the team.

== Regular season ==
The Nordiques would name former Montreal Canadiens great Maurice Richard the head coach of the club, and played their first ever game on October 11, 1972, losing 2–0 on the road to the Cleveland Crusaders. The Nordiques would win their home opener, shutting out the Alberta Oilers 6–0 at Le Colisée. After the game, Richard would step down from head coaching duties, as he was not comfortable doing the job, and Maurice Filion would take over. The Nords would end up just missing the playoffs, finishing the year with a 33–40–5 record, earning them 71 points, 3 behind the Ottawa Nationals for the final playoff position in the Eastern Division.

Offensively, Quebec was led by defenceman J. C. Tremblay, who led the WHA in assists with 75 and led the Nordiques with 89 points. Alain Caron would score a team high 36 goals. Michel Parizeau and Andre Gaudette would each break the 70 point barrier, recording 73 points and 71 respectively. Pierre Roy would lead the club with 169 penalty minutes, while Michel Rouleau would get 142 in 52 games after being acquired by the Philadelphia Blazers.

In goal, Serge Aubry would get the majority of playing time, earning a club high 25 wins and a team best 3.60 GAA along with 2 shutouts.

=== Season standings ===
Eastern Division
	GP	W	L	T	GF	GA	PIM	Pts
New England Whalers	78	46	30	2	318	263	858	94
Cleveland Crusaders	78	43	32	3	287	239	1095	89
Philadelphia Blazers	78	38	40	0	288	305	1260	76
Ottawa Nationals	78	35	39	4	279	301	1067	74
Quebec Nordiques	78	33	40	5	276	313	1354	71
New York Raiders	78	33	43	2	303	334	900	68

== Schedule and results ==
1972–73 regular season
October

Game	Date	Visitor	Score	Home	Record	Points
1	October 11	Quebec Nordiques	0–2	Cleveland Crusaders	0–1–0	0
2	October 13	Alberta Oilers	0–6	Quebec Nordiques	1–1–0	2
3	October 19	Quebec Nordiques	4–3	New England Whalers	2–1–0	4
4	October 21	New England Whalers	4–6	Quebec Nordiques	3–1–0	6
5	October 22	Ottawa Nationals	3–2	Quebec Nordiques	3–2–0	6
6	October 24	Houston Aeros	3–5	Quebec Nordiques	4–2–0	8
7	October 26	Minnesota Fighting Saints	4–5	Quebec Nordiques	5–2–0	10
8	October 29	Cleveland Crusaders	2–2	Quebec Nordiques	5–2–1	11
9	October 31	Los Angeles Sharks	4–2	Quebec Nordiques	5–3–1	11

November

Game	Date	Visitor	Score	Home	Record	Points
10	November 2	Philadelphia Blazers	3–6	Quebec Nordiques	6–3–1	13
11	November 4	Quebec Nordiques	4–5	Cleveland Crusaders	6–4–1	13
12	November 5	Chicago Cougars	2–3	Quebec Nordiques	7–4–1	15
13	November 8	Winnipeg Jets	2–3	Quebec Nordiques	8–4–1	17
14	November 11	Houston Aeros	1–3	Quebec Nordiques	9–4–1	19
15	November 15	New York Raiders	4–7	Quebec Nordiques	10–4–1	21
16	November 16	Quebec Nordiques	4–5	Minnesota Fighting Saints	10–5–1	21
17	November 18	Quebec Nordiques	1–7	New York Raiders	10–6–1	21
18	November 21	Quebec Nordiques	2–4	Ottawa Nationals	10–7–1	21
19	November 24	Quebec Nordiques	3–5	Winnipeg Jets	10–8–1	21
20	November 26	Quebec Nordiques	1–4	Winnipeg Jets	10–9–1	21
21	November 28	Chicago Cougars	2–6	Quebec Nordiques	11–9–1	23

December

Game	Date	Visitor	Score	Home	Record	Points
22	December 2	Quebec Nordiques	2–7	New England Whalers	11–10–1	23
23	December 3	Quebec Nordiques	6–2	Alberta Oilers	12–10–1	25
24	December 5	Quebec Nordiques	4–2	Winnipeg Jets	13–10–1	27
25	December 7	Cleveland Crusaders	3–1	Quebec Nordiques	13–11–1	27
26	December 9	Quebec Nordiques	4–2	Chicago Cougars	14–11–1	29
27	December 10	Quebec Nordiques	6–7	Ottawa Nationals	14–12–1	29
28	December 12	Philadelphia Blazers	2–5	Quebec Nordiques	15–12–1	31
29	December 13	Quebec Nordiques	1–9	New York Raiders	15–13–1	31
30	December 15	Quebec Nordiques	3–6	Cleveland Crusaders	15–14–1	31
31	December 17	Cleveland Crusaders	2–3	Quebec Nordiques	16–14–1	33
32	December 19	Ottawa Nationals	3–7	Quebec Nordiques	17–14–1	35
33	December 23	Los Angeles Sharks	1–2	Quebec Nordiques	18–14–1	37
34	December 24	Quebec Nordiques	2–6	Ottawa Nationals	18–15–1	37
35	December 26	New York Raiders	5–2	Quebec Nordiques	18–16–1	37
36	December 28	New England Whalers	5–3	Quebec Nordiques	18–17–1	37
37	December 29	Quebec Nordiques	3–5	Cleveland Crusaders	18–18–1	37
38	December 31	Ottawa Nationals	4–8	Quebec Nordiques	19–18–1	39

January

Game	Date	Visitor	Score	Home	Record	Points
39	January 8	Quebec Nordiques	6–5	New York Raiders	20–18–1	41
40	January 9	Quebec Nordiques	5–7	Ottawa Nationals	20–19–1	41
41	January 12	Quebec Nordiques	2–3	Minnesota Fighting Saints	20–20–1	41
42	January 13	Quebec Nordiques	4–9	Philadelphia Blazers	20–21–1	41
43	January 16	Ottawa Nationals	4–5	Quebec Nordiques	21–21–1	43
44	January 18	New York Raiders	4–4	Quebec Nordiques	21–21–2	44
45	January 20	Minnesota Fighting Saints	10–5	Quebec Nordiques	21–22–2	44
46	January 23	Quebec Nordiques	1–7	Chicago Cougars	21–23–2	44
47	January 24	Philadelphia Blazers	6–4	Quebec Nordiques	21–24–2	44
48	January 26	Winnipeg Jets	2–2	Quebec Nordiques	21–24–3	45
49	January 27	Quebec Nordiques	3–1	New England Whalers	22–24–3	47

February

Game	Date	Visitor	Score	Home	Record	Points
50	February 1	Minnesota Fighting Saints	2–4	Quebec Nordiques	23–24–3	49
51	February 4	Quebec Nordiques	4–5	New York Raiders	23–25–3	49
52	February 7	Philadelphia Blazers	0–3	Quebec Nordiques	24–25–3	51
53	February 8	Quebec Nordiques	2–5	Chicago Cougars	24–26–3	51
54	February 10	Quebec Nordiques	4–5	Philadelphia Blazers	24–27–3	51
55	February 11	New England Whalers	2–2	Quebec Nordiques	24–27–4	52
56	February 14	Ottawa Nationals	6–3	Quebec Nordiques	24–28–4	52
57	February 16	Los Angeles Sharks	2–2	Quebec Nordiques	24–28–5	53
58	February 17	New England Whalers	6–4	Quebec Nordiques	24–29–5	53
59	February 20	Chicago Cougars	4–2	Quebec Nordiques	24–30–5	53
60	February 22	Quebec Nordiques	2–4	Houston Aeros	24–31–5	53
61	February 24	Quebec Nordiques	5–3	Los Angeles Sharks	25–31–5	55
62	February 25	Quebec Nordiques	2–4	Los Angeles Sharks	25–32–5	55

March

Game	Date	Visitor	Score	Home	Record	Points
63	March 3	Quebec Nordiques	4–3	Houston Aeros	26–32–5	57
64	March 4	Quebec Nordiques	6–3	Houston Aeros	27–32–5	59
65	March 6	Quebec Nordiques	2–3	Los Angeles Sharks	27–33–5	59
66	March 8	Winnipeg Jets	7–4	Quebec Nordiques	27–34–5	59
67	March 9	Quebec Nordiques	3–11	Philadelphia Blazers	27–35–5	59
68	March 11	New York Raiders	1–6	Quebec Nordiques	28–35–5	61
69	March 12	Quebec Nordiques	6–4	Philadelphia Blazers	29–35–5	63
70	March 16	Quebec Nordiques	2–4	Alberta Oilers	29–36–5	63
71	March 17	Quebec Nordiques	0–3	Alberta Oilers	29–37–5	63
72	March 20	Cleveland Crusaders	1–4	Quebec Nordiques	30–37–5	65
73	March 24	Alberta Oilers	4–5	Quebec Nordiques	31–37–5	67
74	March 25	Alberta Oilers	5–4	Quebec Nordiques	31–38–5	67
75	March 27	Quebec Nordiques	2–6	Ottawa Nationals	31–39–5	67
76	March 29	Quebec Nordiques	5–3	Minnesota Fighting Saints	32–39–5	69
77	March 31	Houston Aeros	1–5	Quebec Nordiques	33–39–5	71

April

Game	Date	Visitor	Score	Home	Record	Points
78	April 1	Quebec Nordiques	3–8	New England Whalers	33–40–5	71

Legend: Win (2 points) Loss (0 points) Tie (1 point)

== Player statistics ==
Players

Regular season
Player	Position	GP	G	A	Pts	PIM	+/-	PPG	SHG	GWG
J. C. Tremblay	D	75	14	75	89	32	0	4	0	3
Michel Parizeau	C	75	25	48	73	50	0	10	1	4
Andre Gaudette	C	77	27	44	71	12	0	0	5	3
Alain Caron	RW	68	36	27	63	14	0	15	0	5
Bobby Guindon	LW	71	28	28	56	31	0	3	1	0
Rene Leclerc	RW	67	24	28	52	111	0	8	2	0
Jean-Guy Gendron	LW	63	17	33	50	113	0	5	0	0
Jean Payette	C	71	15	29	44	46	0	8	0	0
Michel Archambault	LW	57	12	25	37	36	0	3	0	0
Yves Bergeron	RW	65	14	19	33	32	0	3	0	0
Francois Lacombe	D	62	10	18	28	123	0	0	0	0
Rejean Giroux	RW	59	10	12	22	41	0	4	0	0
Michel Rouleau	C	52	7	14	21	142	0	0	1	0
Frank Golembrosky	RW	52	8	12	20	44	0	0	0	0
Pierre Roy	D	64	7	12	19	169	0	1	0	0
Michel Harvey	C	40	6	13	19	14	0	2	0	0
Pierre Guite	LW	66	10	8	18	136	0	1	0	0
Jim Blain	D	70	1	10	11	78	0	0	0	0
Ken Desjardine	D	37	2	6	8	36	0	0	0	0
Paul Larose	RW	28	0	7	7	7	0	0	0	0
Guy Dufour	RW	9	3	2	5	2	0	1	0	0
Jean-Yves Cartier	D	15	0	3	3	8	0	0	0	0
Norm Descoteaux	D	2	0	1	1	0	0	0	0	0
Jacques Lemelin	G	9	0	1	1	0	0	0	0	0
Brit Selby	LW	7	0	1	1	4	0	0	0	0
Serge Aubry	G	52	0	0	0	54	0	0	0	0
Richard Brodeur	G	24	0	0	0	4	0	0	0	0
Alan Globensky	D	3	0	0	0	0	0	0	0	0
Mike McNamara	C	19	0	0	0	5	0	0	0	0

Player	MIN	GP	W	L	T	GA	GAA	SO
Serge Aubry	3036	52	25	22	3	182	3.60	1
Richard Brodeur	1288	24	5	14	2	102	4.75	0
Jacques Lemelin	434	9	3	4	0	29	4.01	0
Team:	4758	78	33	40	5	313	3.95	1

Note:

Pos = Position;GP = Games played; G = Goals; A = Assists; Pts = Points; PIM = Penalty minutes; +/- = Plus/minus; PPG = Power-play goals; SHG = Short-handed goals; GWG = Game-winning goals
Pos = Position;GP = Games played; Min, TOI = Minutes played; W = Wins; L = Losses; T,T/OT = Ties; OTL = Overtime losses; GA = Goals-against; GAA = Goals-against average; SO = Shutouts; SA = Shots against; SV = Shots saved;SV% = Save percentage;

== See also ==
- 1972–73 WHA season
