= 1972–73 Ottawa Nationals season =

World Hockey Association team season

1972–73 Ottawa Nationals
- Division: 4th Eastern
- 1972–73 record: 35–39–4
- Home record: 21–15–3
- Road record: 14–24–1
- Goals for: 279
- Goals against: 301

Team information
- General manager: A.J. (Buck) Houle
- Coach: Billy Harris
- Captain: Guy Trottier
- Alternate captains: Wayne Carleton; Rick Sentes
- Arena: Ottawa Civic Centre (regular season); Maple Leaf Gardens (playoffs)
- Average attendance: 3,226 (34.7%)

Team leaders
- Goals: Wayne Carleton (42)
- Assists: Wayne Carleton (49)
- Points: Wayne Carleton (91)
- Penalty minutes: Rick Cunningham (121)
- Wins: Gilles Gratton (25)
- Goals against average: Gilles Gratton (3.71)

The 1972–73 Ottawa Nationals season was the Nationals' only season, as they were one of the original teams in the newly created WHA. The Nationals played most of the season in Ottawa, but transferred their playoff games to Toronto. Due to low attendance in Ottawa, an arena lease dispute, and much better attendance in their two playoff games in Toronto, where they averaged over 5000 fans per game, the Nationals relocated to Toronto permanently beginning in the next season. The club was renamed the Toronto Toros.

== Offseason ==
The Nationals were originally owned by Doug Michel, with rumours he would place the team in either Hamilton or Toronto, however, and he placed the club in Ottawa. After the team was placed to play in Ottawa, Nick Trbovich became the majority owner, with Michel running hockey operations. The club was placed in the six team Eastern Division, with the top four clubs earning a playoff berth.

The Nationals hired former Toronto Maple Leaf Billy Harris to coach the team. Ottawa's most significant signing was Wayne Carleton, who had previously played with the Maple Leafs, Boston Bruins and California Golden Seals in the NHL.

== Regular season ==
The first game in WHA history was a match between the Nationals and the Alberta Oilers at the Civic Centre, which Alberta won 7–4, on October 11, 1972. Ottawa recorded their first victory in their fourth game, a 6-2 decision over the Chicago Cougars. The Nationals reached a season high two games over .500 with a 12-10-1 record, before falling into a long slump in which the club won only seven games in their next 31, and dropped into last place in the Eastern Division. Ottawa played very good hockey down the stretch, winning two-thirds of its remaining games, and finished the season at 35-39-4, earning 74 points and the fourth and final playoff position.

Attendance was an issue for the club, as they drew an average of just over 3000 fans per game, competing against the very popular Ottawa 67's OHA team.

Offensively, Ottawa was led by Carleton, who scored a team high 42 goals and 49 assists for 91 points, which ranked him tenth in league scoring. Twenty-one-year-old Gavin Kirk earned 68 points in 78 games, while Bob Charlebois earned 64 points. Brian Gibbons had 42 points to lead the team's defencemen, while Rick Cunningham had a team high 121 penalty minutes.

In goal, Gilles Gratton had the majority of playing time, winning 25 games and posting a 3.71 GAA. Veteran Les Binkley backed him up, earning 10 wins and a GAA of 3.72.

=== Season standings ===
Eastern Division
	GP	W	L	T	GF	GA	PIM	Pts
New England Whalers	78	46	30	2	318	263	858	94
Cleveland Crusaders	78	43	32	3	287	239	1095	89
Philadelphia Blazers	78	38	40	0	288	305	1260	76
Ottawa Nationals	78	35	39	4	279	301	1067	74
Quebec Nordiques	78	33	40	5	276	313	1354	71
New York Raiders	78	33	43	2	303	334	900	68

== Schedule and results ==
1972–73 regular season
October

Game	Date	Visitor	Score	Home	Record	Pts
1	October 11	Alberta Oilers	7–4	Ottawa Nationals	0–1–0	0
2	October 14	Ottawa Nationals	6–8	New York Raiders	0–2–0	0
3	October 15	Cleveland Crusaders	7–5	Ottawa Nationals	0–3–0	0
4	October 19	Chicago Cougars	2–6	Ottawa Nationals	1–3–0	2
5	October 21	Ottawa Nationals	5–3	Cleveland Crusaders	2–3–0	4
6	October 22	Ottawa Nationals	3–2	Quebec Nordiques	3–3–0	6
7	October 25	Ottawa Nationals	8–5	Los Angeles Sharks	4–3–0	8
8	October 26	Ottawa Nationals	3–7	Houston Aeros	4–4–0	8
9	October 28	Ottawa Nationals	5–3	Philadelphia Blazers	5–4–0	10

November

Game	Date	Visitor	Score	Home	Record	Pts
10	November 2	Los Angeles Sharks	1–1	Ottawa Nationals	5–4–1	11
11	November 5	Ottawa Nationals	5–3	Alberta Oilers	6–4–1	13
12	November 9	Winnipeg Jets	4–1	Ottawa Nationals	6–5–1	13
13	November 12	Philadelphia Blazers	1–2	Ottawa Nationals	7–5–1	15
14	November 16	Ottawa Nationals	3–6	Cleveland Crusaders	7–6–1	15
15	November 18	Ottawa Nationals	2–3	New England Whalers	7–7–1	15
16	November 20	Ottawa Nationals	5–7	New England Whalers	7–8–1	15
17	November 21	Quebec Nordiques	2–4	Ottawa Nationals	8–8–1	17
18	November 23	Chicago Cougars	8–1	Ottawa Nationals	8–9–1	17
19	November 26	Alberta Oilers	2–1	Ottawa Nationals	8–10–1	17
20	November 28	Minnesota Fighting Saints	2–3	Ottawa Nationals	9–10–1	19
21	November 30	Cleveland Crusaders	2–3	Ottawa Nationals	10–10–1	21

December

Game	Date	Visitor	Score	Home	Record	Pts
22	December 1	Ottawa Nationals	4–3	Winnipeg Jets	11–10–1	23
23	December 3	Houston Aeros	4–5	Ottawa Nationals	12–10–1	25
24	December 4	Ottawa Nationals	2–7	New England Whalers	12–11–1	25
25	December 7	New England Whalers	4–2	Ottawa Nationals	12–12–1	25
26	December 9	Ottawa Nationals	1–7	Philadelphia Blazers	12–13–1	25
27	December 10	Quebec Nordiques	6–7	Ottawa Nationals	13–13–1	27
28	December 14	New York Raiders	4–3	Ottawa Nationals	13–14–1	27
29	December 15	Ottawa Nationals	4–3	Alberta Oilers	14–14–1	29
30	December 17	Ottawa Nationals	1–3	Alberta Oilers	14–15–1	29
31	December 19	Ottawa Nationals	3–7	Quebec Nordiques	14–16–1	29
32	December 21	Los Angeles Sharks	4–4	Ottawa Nationals	14–16–2	30
33	December 22	Ottawa Nationals	5–7	New York Raiders	14–17–2	30
34	December 24	Quebec Nordiques	2–6	Ottawa Nationals	15–17–2	32
35	December 26	Houston Aeros	3–3	Ottawa Nationals	15–17–3	33
36	December 30	Ottawa Nationals	4–2	Chicago Cougars	16–17–3	35
37	December 31	Ottawa Nationals	4–8	Quebec Nordiques	16–18–3	35

January

Game	Date	Visitor	Score	Home	Record	Pts
38	January 4	Ottawa Nationals	4–9	New York Raiders	16–19–3	35
39	January 9	Quebec Nordiques	5–7	Ottawa Nationals	17–19–3	37
40	January 11	New York Raiders	1–4	Ottawa Nationals	18–19–3	39
41	January 12	Ottawa Nationals	3–4	Philadelphia Blazers	18–20–3	39
42	January 14	Ottawa Nationals	2–3	Minnesota Fighting Saints	18–21–3	39
43	January 16	Ottawa Nationals	4–5	Quebec Nordiques	18–22–3	39
44	January 18	Minnesota Fighting Saints	3–6	Ottawa Nationals	19–22–3	41
45	January 19	Ottawa Nationals	2–4	Philadelphia Blazers	19–23–3	41
46	January 21	Ottawa Nationals	2–5	Houston Aeros	19–24–3	41
47	January 23	Ottawa Nationals	3–11	Houston Aeros	19–25–3	41
48	January 25	New England Whalers	4–2	Ottawa Nationals	19–26–3	41
49	January 26	Ottawa Nationals	2–4	Minnesota Fighting Saints	19–27–3	41
50	January 28	Winnipeg Jets	5–4	Ottawa Nationals	19–28–3	41
51	January 30	Philadelphia Blazers	5–4	Ottawa Nationals	19–29–3	41

February

Game	Date	Visitor	Score	Home	Record	Pts
52	February 1	Ottawa Nationals	2–2	Cleveland Crusaders	19–29–4	42
53	February 2	Ottawa Nationals	1–4	Chicago Cougars	19–30–4	42
54	February 4	Cleveland Crusaders	3–2	Ottawa Nationals	19–31–4	42
55	February 6	Philadelphia Blazers	3–5	Ottawa Nationals	20–31–4	44
56	February 8	New York Raiders	3–2	Ottawa Nationals	20–32–4	44
57	February 9	Ottawa Nationals	7–4	New England Whalers	21–32–4	46
58	February 11	Ottawa Nationals	2–3	New York Raiders	21–33–4	46
59	February 14	Ottawa Nationals	6–3	Quebec Nordiques	22–33–4	48
60	February 15	Ottawa Nationals	0–3	Minnesota Fighting Saints	22–34–4	48
61	February 17	Ottawa Nationals	3–1	Chicago Cougars	23–34–4	50
62	February 20	Los Angeles Sharks	4–2	Ottawa Nationals	23–35–4	50
63	February 22	Philadelphia Blazers	6–5	Ottawa Nationals	23–36-4	50
64	February 25	Alberta Oilers	2–3	Ottawa Nationals	24–36–4	52
65	February 27	Cleveland Crusaders	1–2	Ottawa Nationals	25–36–4	54

March

Game	Date	Visitor	Score	Home	Record	Pts
66	March 1	New York Raiders	1–2	Ottawa Nationals	26–36–4	56
67	March 4	Chicago Cougars	4–6	Ottawa Nationals	27–36–4	58
68	March 6	Winnipeg Jets	2–5	Ottawa Nationals	28–36–4	60
69	March 11	Ottawa Nationals	2–4	Los Angeles Sharks	28–37–4	60
70	March 13	Ottawa Nationals	3–1	Los Angeles Sharks	29–37–4	62
71	March 16	Ottawa Nationals	6–1	Winnipeg Jets	30–37–4	64
72	March 18	Ottawa Nationals	4–2	Winnipeg Jets	31–37–4	66
73	March 22	New England Whalers	2–4	Ottawa Nationals	32–37–4	68
74	March 25	Minnesota Fighting Saints	1–6	Ottawa Nationals	33–37–4	70
75	March 27	Quebec Nordiques	2–6	Ottawa Nationals	34–37–4	72
76	March 29	New England Whalers	2–5	Ottawa Nationals	35–37–4	74
77	March 31	Ottawa Nationals	2–4	Cleveland Crusaders	35–38–4	74

April

Game	Date	Visitor	Score	Home	Record	Pts
78	April 1	Houston Aeros	6–3	Ottawa Nationals	35–39–4	74

Legend: Win (2 points) Loss (0 points) Tie (1 point)

== Playoffs ==
The Nationals opened the playoffs with a best of seven series against the New England Whalers, who had a league high 94 points. The series opened up with two games in New England, and the Whalers took advantage of their home ice, defeating Ottawa 6-3 and 4–3 to take a two-game series lead. The series moved to Maple Leaf Gardens in Toronto, as the Nationals ownership decided to move their playoff games from Ottawa due to attendance problems. The Nationals used their "home ice" advantage in the third game, defeating the Whalers 4–2 to get back into the series; however, New England easily defeated Ottawa in the fourth game 7–3 to take a 3–1 series lead. The Whalers closed out the series in the fifth game back in New England, as they beat Ottawa 5–4 in overtime to eliminate the Nationals.

1973 Avco Cup playoffs
Quarterfinals vs. New England Whalers – Whalers win 4–1

Game	Date	Visitor	Score	Home	Series
1	April 7	Ottawa Nationals	3–6	New England Whalers	0–1
2	April 8	Ottawa Nationals	3–4	New England Whalers	0–2
3	April 10	New England Whalers	2–4	Ottawa Nationals	1-2
4	April 12	New England Whalers	7–3	Ottawa Nationals	1–3
5	April 14	Ottawa Nationals	4–5	New England Whalers	1-4

Legend: Win Loss

== Player statistics ==
=== Skaters ===
Regular season
Player	GP	G	A	Pts	PIM
Wayne Carleton	75	42	49	91	42
Gavin Kirk	78	28	40	68	54
Bob Charlebois	78	24	40	64	28
Guy Trottier	72	26	32	58	25
Bob Leduc	78	22	33	55	71
Steve King	69	18	34	52	28
Tom Martin	74	19	27	46	27
Brian Gibbons	73	7	35	42	62
Rick Sentes	74	22	19	41	78
Rick Cunningham	78	9	32	41	121
Jack Gibson	59	22	13	35	48
Ron Climie	31	12	19	31	2
Brian Conacher	69	8	19	27	32
Ken Stephanson	77	3	16	19	93
Tom Simpson	57	10	7	17	44
Mike Boland	41	1	15	16	44
Mike Amodeo	61	1	14	15	77
Steve Warr	72	3	8	11	79
Chris Meloff	28	1	6	7	40
Ron Riley	22	0	5	5	2
John Donnelly	15	1	1	2	44
Merv Haney	7	0	1	1	4
Gilles Gratton	51	0	1	1	10
Frank Blum	2	0	0	0	0
Les Binkley	30	0	0	0	0

=== Goaltending ===
Regular season
Player	GP	MIN	W	L	T	GA	SO	GAA}	SV%
Gilles Gratton	51	3021	25	22	3	187	0	3.71	.882
Les Binkley	30	1709	10	17	1	106	0	3.72	.882
Frank Blum	2	28	0	0	0	3	0	6.43	.824

=== Playoffs ===
Scoring leaders

Playoffs
Player	GP	G	A	Pts	PIM
Wayne Carleton	3	3	3	6	4
Gavin Kirk	5	2	3	5	12
Tom Martin	5	0	5	5	2
Rick Sentes	5	3	1	4	2
Brian Conacher	5	1	3	4	4
Brian Gibbons	5	1	2	3	12
Guy Trottier	5	1	2	3	0
Bob Charlebois	5	1	1	2	4
Rick Cunningham	5	1	1	2	2
Ken Stephanson	5	1	1	2	8
Bob Leduc	5	0	2	2	4
Ron Climie	4	1	0	1	2
Jack Gibson	1	1	0	1	0
Tom Simpson	5	1	0	1	0
Mike Amodeo	5	0	1	1	10
Steve King	5	0	1	1	7
Les Binkley	4	0	0	0	0
Mike Boland	1	0	0	0	0
Gilles Gratton	2	0	0	0	0
Ron Riley	2	0	0	0	0
Steve Warr	2	0	0	0	0

Goaltending

Player	GP	TOI	W	L	GA	SO	GAA
Les Binkley	4	223	1	3	17	0	4.57
Gilles Gratton	2	87	0	1	7	0	4.83

== See also ==
- 1972–73 WHA season
