= Ottawa Nationals =

Former ice hockey team of the World Hockey Association

- City: Ottawa, Ontario
- League: World Hockey Association
- Operated: 1972–73
- Home arena: Ottawa Civic Centre
- Media: TVOntario; CKOY

Franchise history
- 1972–1973: Ottawa Nationals
- 1973–1976: Toronto Toros
- 1976–1979: Birmingham Bulls

The Ottawa Nationals were a professional men's ice hockey team out of Ottawa that played in the World Hockey Association (WHA) during the 1972–73 WHA season.

== History ==
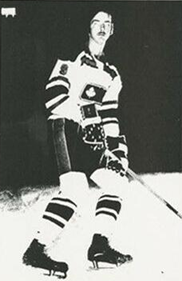
1972-73 card with Ottawa Nationals player Wayne Carleton on the ice

The WHA had originally granted a franchise to Doug Michel for "Ontario". Original plans called for the team to play at Maple Leaf Gardens in Toronto, but Michel couldn't get a favourable lease. Afterward, it was expected that Hamilton would be the team's home, but it was eventually placed in Ottawa. Nick Trbovich became majority owner before the season began, with Michel running hockey operations.

They were coached by Billy Harris and led on the ice by Wayne Carleton, who scored 42 goals and 92 points during the season. They hosted the first-ever WHA game, on October 11, 1972, losing 7–4 to the Alberta Oilers.

Their home arena was the Ottawa Civic Centre, but they were a flop at the box office, averaging about 3,000 fans per game. Owing to a dispute with the city of Ottawa, the Nationals elected to play their playoff games at Maple Leaf Gardens rather than their regular season home of the Ottawa Civic Centre. The equipment for the team was placed in Maple Leaf Gardens on the eve of Game 1. The team called themselves the "Ontario Nationals" for the playoffs. After the season, the team was sold to John F. Bassett and became the Toronto Toros.

The last Ottawa Nationals player active in North American major professional hockey was Mike Amodeo, who played one season in the NHL with the Winnipeg Jets in the 1979–80 NHL season, before moving to Sweden, then Italy, before his retirement in 1983.

== Season-by-season record ==
Note: GP = Games played, W = Wins, L = Losses, T = Ties, Pts = Points, GF = Goals for, GA = Goals against, PIM = Penalties in minutes

Season	GP	W	L	T	Pts	GF	GA	PIM	Finish	Playoffs
1972–73	78	35	39	4	74	279	301	1067	4th, Eastern	Lost quarter-final (Whalers)

== See also ==
- Ice hockey in Ottawa
- List of ice hockey teams in Ontario
