= List of WHA seasons =

The World Hockey Association (WHA) operated for seven seasons from 1972 until 1979.

Season	Teams	Avco Cup Champion
1972–73	Eastern: Cleveland Crusaders • New England Whalers • New York Raiders • Ottawa Nationals • Philadelphia Blazers • Quebec Nordiques; Western: Alberta Oilers • Chicago Cougars • Houston Aeros • Los Angeles Sharks • Minnesota Fighting Saints • Winnipeg Jets	New England Whalers (Playoffs)
1973–74	Eastern: Chicago Cougars • Cleveland Crusaders • New England Whalers • NY Golden Blades / NJ Knights • Quebec Nordiques • Toronto Toros; Western: Edmonton Oilers • Houston Aeros • Los Angeles Sharks • Minnesota Fighting Saints • Vancouver Blazers • Winnipeg Jets: New York Raiders renamed New York Golden Blades, which were then renamed New Jersey Knights midseason.; Ottawa Nationals relocated to Toronto as the Toros.; Philadelphia Blazers relocated to Vancouver, switching divisions with Chicago Cougars.; Alberta Oilers renamed Edmonton Oilers, having dropped playing some home games in Calgary.	Houston Aeros (Playoffs)
1974–75	Canadian: Edmonton Oilers • Quebec Nordiques • Toronto Toros • Vancouver Blazers • Winnipeg Jets; Eastern: Cleveland Crusaders • Chicago Cougars • Indianapolis Racers • New England Whalers; Western: Houston Aeros • Michigan Stags/Baltimore Blades • Minnesota Fighting Saints • Phoenix Roadrunners • San Diego Mariners: Two expansion teams, Indianapolis Racers (in the Eastern Division) and Phoenix Roadrunners (in the Western Division), are added.; The Canadian Division is created, as Edmonton, Vancouver, and Winnipeg moved in from the Western Division while Quebec and Toronto moved in from the Eastern Division.; Los Angeles Sharks relocated to Detroit as the Michigan Stags, which relocated to Baltimore as the Blades midseason.; New Jersey Knights moved to San Diego as the Mariners.; New England relocated to Hartford	Houston Aeros (Playoffs)
1975–76	Canadian: Calgary Cowboys • Denver Spurs/Ottawa Civics • Edmonton Oilers • Toronto Toros • Quebec Nordiques • Winnipeg Jets; Eastern: Cleveland Crusaders • Cincinnati Stingers • Indianapolis Racers • New England Whalers; Western: Houston Aeros • Minnesota Fighting Saints • Phoenix Roadrunners • San Diego Mariners: Baltimore Blades and Chicago Cougars folded.; Two expansion teams, Cincinnati Stingers (in the Eastern Division) and Denver Spurs (in the Western Division), are added.; Also halfway through the season, Denver moved to Ottawa as the Civics (moving to the Canadian Division), which folded later on.; Vancouver Blazers relocated to Calgary as the Cowboys.	Winnipeg Jets (Playoffs)
1976–77	Eastern: Birmingham Bulls • Cincinnati Stingers • Indianapolis Racers • Minnesota Fighting Saints • New England Whalers • Quebec Nordiques; Western: Calgary Cowboys • Edmonton Oilers • Houston Aeros • Phoenix Roadrunners • San Diego Mariners • Winnipeg Jets: The Canadian Division ceased to exist as Calgary, Edmonton, and Winnipeg rejoined the Western Division while Toronto (relocated to Birmingham as the Bulls) and Quebec rejoined the Eastern Division.; The first Minnesota Fighting Saints are folded, but the Cleveland Crusaders relocate to Minnesota as the second Fighting Saints, still remaining in the Eastern Division,;they also folded midseason.	Quebec Nordiques (Playoffs)
1977–78	Birmingham Bulls • Cincinnati Stingers • Edmonton Oilers • Houston Aeros • Indianapolis Racers • New England Whalers • Quebec Nordiques • Winnipeg Jets: Both divisions ceased to exist as Calgary, Phoenix, and San Diego fold; the league realigned into a single table.; Two international all-star teams, the Soviet All-Stars and Czechoslovakia All-Stars, play a limited schedule.	Winnipeg Jets (Playoffs)
1978–79	Birmingham Bulls • Cincinnati Stingers • Edmonton Oilers • Indianapolis Racers • New England Whalers • Quebec Nordiques • Winnipeg Jets: Houston Aeros folded.; Indianapolis Racers folded midseason.; The Finnish National Team played one regular season game in the league, losing to the Edmonton Oilers.	Winnipeg Jets (Playoffs)

The WHA ceased operations after the 1978–79 season. As part of the NHL-WHA merger, four WHA franchises moved to the National Hockey League for the 1979–80 NHL season: Edmonton, New England (renamed Hartford Whalers), Quebec, and Winnipeg. The other two WHA-enfranchised teams, Birmingham and Cincinnati, folded.

== See also ==
- Avco World Trophy
- List of NHL seasons
