= 1973–74 Minnesota Fighting Saints season =

World Hockey Association team season

1973–74 Minnesota Fighting Saints
- Division: 2nd West
- 1973–74 record: 44–32–2
- Home record: 26–12–1
- Road record: 18–20–1
- Goals for: 332
- Goals against: 275

Team information
- General manager: Glen Sonmor
- Coach: Harry Neale
- Captain: Ted Hampson
- Alternate captains: Mike McMahon; John Arbour; Wayne Connelly
- Arena: St. Paul Civic Center
- Average attendance: 6,584 (40.7%)

Team leaders
- Goals: Mike Walton (57)
- Assists: Mike Walton (60)
- Points: Mike Walton (117)
- Penalty minutes: Gord Gallant (223)
- Wins: Mike Curran (23)
- Goals against average: Mike Curran (3.27)

The 1973–74 Minnesota Fighting Saints' season was the Minnesota Fighting Saints' second season of operation in the World Hockey Association (WHA).

== Regular season ==
=== Final standings ===
Western Division
	GP	W	L	T	GF	GA	PIM	Pts
Houston Aeros	78	48	25	5	318	219	1038	101
Minnesota Fighting Saints	78	44	32	2	332	275	1243	90
Edmonton Oilers	78	38	37	3	268	269	1273	79
Winnipeg Jets	78	34	39	5	264	296	673	73
Vancouver Blazers	78	27	50	1	278	345	1047	55
Los Angeles Sharks	78	25	53	0	239	339	1086	50

== Schedule and results ==
1973–74 regular season
October

Game	Result	Date	Score	Opponent	Record
1	W	October 12, 1973	5–4	Vancouver Blazers (1973–74)	1–0–0
2	W	October 14, 1973	5–2	@ Toronto Toros (1973–74)	2–0–0
3	T	October 15, 1973	3–3	@ New England Whalers (1973–74)	2–0–1
4	W	October 19, 1973	1–0	New England Whalers (1973–74)	3–0–1
5	L	October 21, 1973	1–2 OT	@ Winnipeg Jets (1973–74)	3–1–1
6	L	October 24, 1973	2–5	@ New York Golden Blades/New Jersey Knights (1973–74)	3–2–1
7	L	October 26, 1973	4–5	Quebec Nordiques (1973–74)	3–3–1
8	W	October 27, 1973	5–2	Winnipeg Jets (1973–74)	4–3–1
9	L	October 30, 1973	1–6	@ Houston Aeros (1973–74)	4–4–1

November

Game	Result	Date	Score	Opponent	Record
10	W	November 2, 1973	5–1	@ Los Angeles Sharks (1973–74)	5–4–1
11	L	November 4, 1973	3–4	@ Edmonton Oilers (1973–74)	5–5–1
12	W	November 7, 1973	10–1	New York Golden Blades/New Jersey Knights (1973–74)	6–5–1
13	W	November 9, 1973	3–1	Vancouver Blazers (1973–74)	7–5–1
14	W	November 11, 1973	6–4	Cleveland Crusaders (1973–74)	8–5–1
15	L	November 13, 1973	2–5	Houston Aeros (1973–74)	8–6–1
16	L	November 15, 1973	5–7	@ Vancouver Blazers (1973–74)	8–7–1
17	W	November 18, 1973	5–2	@ Edmonton Oilers (1973–74)	9–7–1
18	L	November 20, 1973	2–6	@ Los Angeles Sharks (1973–74)	9–8–1
19	W	November 22, 1973	7–5	New England Whalers (1973–74)	10–8–1
20	W	November 25, 1973	5–3	Winnipeg Jets (1973–74)	11–8–1
21	L	November 28, 1973	3–5	@ Vancouver Blazers (1973–74)	11–9–1
22	L	November 30, 1973	1–2	Toronto Toros (1973–74)	11–10–1

December

Game	Result	Date	Score	Opponent	Record
23	L	December 2, 1973	1–2	@ New York Golden Blades/New Jersey Knights (1973–74)	11–11–1
24	W	December 4, 1973	9–2	Los Angeles Sharks (1973–74)	12–11–1
25	W	December 7, 1973	3–1	Vancouver Blazers (1973–74)	13–11–1
26	W	December 8, 1973	4–1	Quebec Nordiques (1973–74)	14–11–1
27	L	December 9, 1973	1–10	@ Toronto Toros (1973–74)	14–12–1
28	W	December 11, 1973	5–3	@ Chicago Cougars (1973–74)	15–12–1
29	L	December 14, 1973	2–5	Houston Aeros (1973–74)	15–13–1
30	W	December 16, 1973	3–2	@ Winnipeg Jets (1973–74)	16–13–1
31	W	December 19, 1973	4–2	@ Vancouver Blazers (1973–74)	17–13–1
32	W	December 21, 1973	4–3	Los Angeles Sharks (1973–74)	18–13–1
33	L	December 22, 1973	1–2	@ Cleveland Crusaders (1973–74)	18–14–1
34	L	December 23, 1973	2–4	Cleveland Crusaders (1973–74)	18–15–1
35	W	December 27, 1973	5–4	@ Edmonton Oilers (1973–74)	19–15–1
36	L	December 29, 1973	3–9	Toronto Toros (1973–74)	19–16–1
37	L	December 30, 1973	3–5	Chicago Cougars (1973–74)	19–17–1

January

Game	Result	Date	Score	Opponent	Record
38	W	January 5, 1974	6–5	@ Chicago Cougars (1973–74)	20–17–1
39	L	January 6, 1974	4–6	Edmonton Oilers (1973–74)	20–18–1
40	L	January 9, 1974	4–6	Edmonton Oilers (1973–74)	20–19–1
41	W	January 12, 1974	8–6	Toronto Toros (1973–74)	21–19–1
42	L	January 13, 1974	2–4	@ Cleveland Crusaders (1973–74)	21–20–1
43	L	January 15, 1974	1–4	@ Edmonton Oilers (1973–74)	21–21–1
44	L	January 19, 1974	2–5	@ New England Whalers (1973–74)	21–22–1
45	L	January 20, 1974	4–5 OT	@ Quebec Nordiques (1973–74)	21–23–1
46	L	January 23, 1974	1–4	New York Golden Blades/New Jersey Knights (1973–74)	21–24–1
47	W	January 25, 1974	6–2	Chicago Cougars (1973–74)	22–24–1
48	W	January 27, 1974	12–2	Winnipeg Jets (1973–74)	23–24–1

February

Game	Result	Date	Score	Opponent	Record
49	W	February 2, 1974	4–2	@ Cleveland Crusaders (1973–74)	24–24–1
50	L	February 3, 1974	4–5	@ Toronto Toros (1973–74)	24–25–1
51	W	February 5, 1974	4–1	Cleveland Crusaders (1973–74)	25–25–1
52	W	February 6, 1974	7–2	Chicago Cougars (1973–74)	26–25–1
53	W	February 8, 1974	4–3 OT	@ Winnipeg Jets (1973–74)	27–25–1
54	W	February 10, 1974	5–2	@ New England Whalers (1973–74)	28–25–1
55	L	February 12, 1974	1–3	Houston Aeros (1973–74)	28–26–1
56	W	February 13, 1974	7–4	Edmonton Oilers (1973–74)	29–26–1
57	W	February 15, 1974	7–1	Winnipeg Jets (1973–74)	30–26–1
58	W	February 17, 1974	6–1	@ Houston Aeros (1973–74)	31–26–1
59	W	February 22, 1974	6–4	@ Quebec Nordiques (1973–74)	32–26–1
60	W	February 24, 1974	2–1	@ Cleveland Crusaders (1973–74)	33–26–1
61	W	February 27, 1974	5–4	Los Angeles Sharks (1973–74)	34–26–1
62	T	February 28, 1974	6–6	Cleveland Crusaders (1973–74)	34–26–2

March

Game	Result	Date	Score	Opponent	Record
63	W	March 1, 1974	4–0	@ Winnipeg Jets (1973–74)	35–26–2
64	W	March 3, 1974	5–3	Los Angeles Sharks (1973–74)	36–26–2
65	W	March 6, 1974	8–6	New England Whalers (1973–74)	37–26–2
66	W	March 9, 1974	9–5	Quebec Nordiques (1973–74)	38–26–2
67	L	March 10, 1974	5–6	@ Los Angeles Sharks (1973–74)	38–27–2
68	L	March 12, 1974	2–3	@ Houston Aeros (1973–74)	38–28–2
69	L	March 14, 1974	4–7	@ Chicago Cougars (1973–74)	38–29–2
70	L	March 15, 1974	3–5	@ New York Golden Blades/New Jersey Knights (1973–74)	38–30–2
71	W	March 17, 1974	5–3	@ Quebec Nordiques (1973–74)	39–30–2
72	L	March 19, 1974	4–5	@ Vancouver Blazers (1973–74)	39–31–2
73	W	March 22, 1974	5–2	@ Los Angeles Sharks (1973–74)	40–31–2
74	W	March 24, 1974	5–3	@ Houston Aeros (1973–74)	41–31–2
75	W	March 27, 1974	6–4	New York Golden Blades/New Jersey Knights (1973–74)	42–31–2
76	L	March 29, 1974	1–3	Edmonton Oilers (1973–74)	42–32–2
77	W	March 31, 1974	5–2	Houston Aeros (1973–74)	43–32–2

April

Game	Result	Date	Score	Opponent	Record
78	W	April 3, 1974	9–0	Vancouver Blazers (1973–74)	44–32–2

Legend: Win (2 points) Loss (0 points) Tie (1 point)

== Playoffs ==
1974 Avco Cup playoffs
Division Semifinals vs. Edmonton Oilers – Fighting Saints win 4–1

Game	Date	Visitor	Score	Home	Series
1	April 6	Edmonton Oilers	1–2	Minnesota Fighting Saints	1–0
2	April 7	Edmonton Oilers	5–8	Minnesota Fighting Saints	2–0
3	April 10	Minnesota Fighting Saints	6–2	Edmonton Oilers	3–0
4	April 12	Minnesota Fighting Saints	1–2	Edmonton Oilers	3–1
5	April 14	Edmonton Oilers	4–5	Minnesota Fighting Saints	4–1

Division Finals vs. Houston Aeros – Aeros win 4–2

Game	Date	Visitor	Score	Home	Series
1	April 18	Minnesota Fighting Saints	5–4 OT	Houston Aeros	0–1
2	April 20	Minnesota Fighting Saints	2–5	Houston Aeros	1–1
3	April 21	Houston Aeros	1–4	Minnesota Fighting Saints	1–2
4	April 28	Houston Aeros	4–1	Minnesota Fighting Saints	2–2
5	April 29	Minnesota Fighting Saints	4–9	Houston Aeros	3–2
6	May 1	Houston Aeros	3–1	Minnesota Fighting Saints	4–2

Legend: Win Loss

== Player statistics ==
Regular season
Scoring

Player	Pos	GP	G	A	Pts	PIM	+/-	PPG	SHG	GWG
Mike Walton	C	78	57	60	117	88	0	9	9	7
Wayne Connelly	C	78	42	53	95	16	0	15	0	6
George Morrison	LW	73	40	38	78	37	0	12	1	3
Murray Heatley	RW	71	26	32	58	23	0	3	0	5
Ted Hampson	C	77	17	38	55	9	0	2	4	4
Jim Johnson	C	71	15	39	54	30	0	1	1	2
Mike Antonovich	C	68	21	29	50	4	0	2	0	4
John Arbour	D	77	6	43	49	192	0	0	0	1
Bob MacMillan	RW	78	14	34	48	81	0	3	0	0
Steve Cardwell	LW	77	23	23	46	100	0	1	1	3
Mike McMahon	D	71	10	35	45	82	0	1	3	1
Rick Smith	D	71	10	28	38	98	0	0	1	3
Keith Christiansen	C	74	11	25	36	36	0	4	0	1
Terry Ball	D	71	8	28	36	34	0	4	0	0
Rob Walton	C	45	8	23	31	24	0	1	0	1
Gord Gallant	LW	72	7	15	22	223	0	0	0	2
Bill Klatt	RW	65	14	6	20	12	0	3	0	1
Bob Boyd	D	41	1	14	15	14	0	0	0	0
Dick Paradise	D	67	2	7	9	71	0	0	0	0
Mike Curran	G	40	0	0	0	6	0	0	0	0
John Garrett	G	40	0	0	0	10	0	0	0	0
Jack McCartan	G	2	0	0	0	0	0	0	0	0
Blaine Rydman	D	8	0	0	0	21	0	0	0	0

Goaltending

Player	MIN	GP	W	L	T	GA	GAA	SO
Mike Curran	2382	40	23	14	2	130	3.27	2
John Garrett	2290	40	21	18	0	137	3.59	1
Jack McCartan	42	2	0	0	0	5	7.14	0
Team:	4714	78	44	32	2	272	3.46	3

Playoffs
Scoring

Player	Pos	GP	G	A	Pts	PIM	PPG	SHG	GWG
Mike Walton	C	11	10	8	18	16	0	0	3
Wayne Connelly	C	11	6	7	13	4	0	0	0
George Morrison	LW	11	5	5	10	12	0	0	0
John Arbour	D	11	3	6	9	27	0	0	1
Ted Hampson	C	11	4	4	8	8	0	0	1
Mike McMahon	D	11	1	7	8	9	0	0	0
Bill Klatt	RW	11	3	2	5	18	0	0	1
Bob MacMillan	RW	11	2	3	5	4	0	0	0
Mike Antonovich	C	11	1	4	5	4	0	0	0
Jim Johnson	C	11	1	4	5	4	0	0	0
Terry Ball	D	11	1	2	3	6	0	0	0
Gord Gallant	LW	11	1	2	3	67	0	0	0
Murray Heatley	RW	10	1	0	1	2	0	0	0
Keith Christiansen	C	10	0	1	1	2	0	0	0
Rick Smith	D	11	0	1	1	22	0	0	0
Bob Boyd	D	7	0	0	0	4	0	0	0
Steve Cardwell	LW	10	0	0	0	20	0	0	0
Mike Curran	G	5	0	0	0	10	0	0	0
John Garrett	G	7	0	0	0	14	0	0	0
Bill Goldthorpe	LW	3	0	0	0	25	0	0	0
Dick Paradise	D	7	0	0	0	6	0	0	0

Goaltending

Player	MIN	GP	W	L	GA	GAA	SO
John Garrett	372	7	4	2	25	4.03	0
Mike Curran	289	5	2	3	14	2.91	0
Team:	661	11	6	5	39	3.54	0

Note: Pos = Position; GP = Games played; G = Goals; A = Assists; Pts = Points; +/- = plus/minus; PIM = Penalty minutes; PPG = Power-play goals; SHG = Short-handed goals; GWG = Game-winning goals
MIN = Minutes played; W = Wins; L = Losses; T = Ties; GA = Goals-against; GAA = Goals-against average; SO = Shutouts;

== Transactions ==
Rob Walton was traded to Vancouver Blazers for Jean Tetreault, January 1974.

Bill Goldthorpe was signed to a contract, May 1974.

== Draft picks ==
Minnesota's draft picks at the 1973 WHA Amateur Draft.

Round	#	Player	Nationality	College/Junior/Club team (League)
1	7	Bob Gainey (F)	Canada	Peterborough Petes (OHA)
2	21	Rick Middleton (F)	Canada	Oshawa Generals (OHA)
3	33	Bob Gassoff (D)	Canada	Medicine Hat Tigers (WCHL)
4	46	Steve Langdon (RW)	Canada	London Knights (OHA)
5	59	Nelson Pyatt (C)	Canada	Oshawa Generals (OHA)
6	72	John Flesch (LW)	Canada	Lake Superior State University (CCHA)
7	85	Tom Machowski (D)	United States	University of Wisconsin (WCHA)
8	97	Bob Young (D)	United States	University of Denver (WCHA)
9	108	Neil Korzack (F)	Canada	Peterborough Petes (OHA)
10	118	Pat Phippen (LW)	United States	St. Paul Bruins

== See also ==
- 1973–74 WHA season
