= 1973–74 Houston Aeros season =

World Hockey Association team season

1973–74 Houston Aeros
- Avco Cup champions
- Division: 1st West
- 1973–74 record: 48–25–5
- Home record: 28–9–2
- Road record: 20–16–3
- Goals for: 318
- Goals against: 219

Team information
- General manager: James S. Smith
- Coach: Bill Dineen
- Captain: Ted Taylor
- Alternate captains: Gordie Howe; Gord Labossiere; Poul Popiel
- Arena: Sam Houston Coliseum
- Average attendance: 6,811 (73.2%)

Team leaders
- Goals: Frank Hughes (42)
- Assists: Gordie Howe (69)
- Points: Gordie Howe (100)
- Penalty minutes: John Schella (170)
- Wins: Don McLeod (49)
- Goals against average: Don McLeod (2.56)

The 1973–74 Houston Aeros season was the Houston Aeros second season of operation in the World Hockey Association (WHA). The season saw the debut of Gordie Howe and his sons in the WHA. The team would win the Avco World Trophy WHA championship.

== Regular season ==
At age 45, Howe scored 100 points during the season, and he was subsequently awarded the Gary L. Davidson Award for most valuable player. Two seasons after he won the award, it was renamed to honor his legacy. The Aeros won the Western Division for the first time in their history.

=== Final standings ===
Western Division
	GP	W	L	T	GF	GA	PIM	Pts
Houston Aeros	78	48	25	5	318	219	1038	101
Minnesota Fighting Saints	78	44	32	2	332	275	1243	90
Edmonton Oilers	78	38	37	3	268	269	1273	79
Winnipeg Jets	78	34	39	5	264	296	673	73
Vancouver Blazers	78	27	50	1	278	345	1047	55
Los Angeles Sharks	78	25	53	0	239	339	1086	50

== Schedule and results ==
1973–74 regular season
October: 4–3–1, 9 points (home: 2–2–0; road: 2–1–1)

Game	Result	Date	Score	Opponent	Record
1	W	October 13, 1973	4–3	@ Los Angeles Sharks (1973–74)	1–0–0
2	L	October 14, 1973	2–5	@ Edmonton Oilers (1973–74)	1–1–0
3	W	October 17, 1973	7–2	@ Vancouver Blazers (1973–74)	2–1–0
4	L	October 21, 1973	0–2	Cleveland Crusaders (1973–74)	2–2–0
5	W	October 24, 1973	6–2	Los Angeles Sharks (1973–74)	3–2–0
6	T	October 27, 1973	2–2	@ Cleveland Crusaders (1973–74)	3–2–1
7	L	October 28, 1973	2–3	Quebec Nordiques (1973–74)	3–3–1
8	W	October 30, 1973	6–1	Minnesota Fighting Saints (1973–74)	4–3–1

November: 7–4–1, 15 points (home: 5–1–1; road: 2–3–0)

Game	Result	Date	Score	Opponent	Record
9	W	November 3, 1973	6–4	Los Angeles Sharks (1973–74)	5–3–1
10	L	November 7, 1973	4–5	Toronto Toros (1973–74)	5–4–1
11	W	November 10, 1973	8–3	Vancouver Blazers (1973–74)	6–4–1
12	W	November 13, 1973	5–2	@ Minnesota Fighting Saints (1973–74)	7–4–1
13	L	November 15, 1973	2–3	@ Chicago Cougars (1973–74)	7–5–1
14	W	November 17, 1973	3–2	@ New York Golden Blades/New Jersey Knights (1973–74)	8–5–1
15	L	November 18, 1973	3–8	@ Quebec Nordiques (1973–74)	8–6–1
16	W	November 21, 1973	4–1	New England Whalers (1973–74)	9–6–1
17	W	November 24, 1973	5–3	Chicago Cougars (1973–74)	10–6–1
18	W	November 25, 1973	2–1	Edmonton Oilers (1973–74)	11–6–1
19	T	November 28, 1973	4–4	Winnipeg Jets (1973–74)	11–6–2
20	L	November 29, 1973	2–5	@ New England Whalers (1973–74)	11–7–2

December: 8–5–2, 18 points (home: 4–1–1; road: 4–4–1)

Game	Result	Date	Score	Opponent	Record
21	T	December 1, 1973	3–3	@ Quebec Nordiques (1973–74)	11–7–3
22	L	December 2, 1973	2–5	@ Toronto Toros (1973–74)	11–8–3
23	W	December 5, 1973	5–2	New York Golden Blades/New Jersey Knights (1973–74)	12–8–3
24	L	December 6, 1973	3–4	@ Los Angeles Sharks (1973–74)	12–9–3
25	W	December 9, 1973	5–3	@ Vancouver Blazers (1973–74)	13–9–3
26	W	December 12, 1973	3–2	@ Winnipeg Jets (1973–74)	14–9–3
27	W	December 14, 1973	5–2	@ Minnesota Fighting Saints (1973–74)	15–9–3
28	L	December 15, 1973	2–5	@ Chicago Cougars (1973–74)	15–10–3
29	T	December 16, 1973	2–2	Cleveland Crusaders (1973–74)	15–10–4
30	W	December 19, 1973	10–0	Winnipeg Jets (1973–74)	16–10–4
31	L	December 21, 1973	1–3	@ Toronto Toros (1973–74)	16–11–4
32	W	December 22, 1973	8–3	Los Angeles Sharks (1973–74)	17–11–4
33	L	December 26, 1973	2–3 OT	New England Whalers (1973–74)	17–12–4
34	W	December 29, 1973	3–0	Chicago Cougars (1973–74)	18–12–4
35	W	December 30, 1973	6–4	@ Los Angeles Sharks (1973–74)	19–12–4

January: 9–4–0, 18 points (home: 7–1–0; road: 2–3–0)

Game	Result	Date	Score	Opponent	Record
36	L	January 5, 1974	1–2	@ New York Golden Blades/New Jersey Knights (1973–74)	19–13–4
37	W	January 6, 1974	7–1	Winnipeg Jets (1973–74)	20–13–4
38	W	January 8, 1974	6–2	Edmonton Oilers (1973–74)	21–13–4
39	W	January 12, 1974	5–1	Quebec Nordiques (1973–74)	22–13–4
40	W	January 16, 1974	4–1	Toronto Toros (1973–74)	23–13–4
41	W	January 17, 1974	7–4	Vancouver Blazers (1973–74)	24–13–4
42	L	January 19, 1974	2–3	Los Angeles Sharks (1973–74)	24–14–4
43	W	January 22, 1974	3–1	Los Angeles Sharks (1973–74)	25–14–4
44	W	January 24, 1974	5–1	Quebec Nordiques (1973–74)	26–14–4
45	W	January 26, 1974	4–2	@ Vancouver Blazers (1973–74)	27–14–4
46	W	January 27, 1974	4–1	@ Edmonton Oilers (1973–74)	28–14–4
47	L	January 30, 1974	1–5	@ Cleveland Crusaders (1973–74)	28–15–4
48	L	January 31, 1974	4–6	@ Quebec Nordiques (1973–74)	28–16–4

February: 11–2–1, 23 points (home: 6–1–0; road: 5–1–1)

Game	Result	Date	Score	Opponent	Record
49	L	February 2, 1974	2–5	@ New England Whalers (1973–74)	28–17–4
50	W	February 4, 1974	7–1	@ New York Golden Blades/New Jersey Knights (1973–74)	29–17–4
51	W	February 5, 1974	4–0	New York Golden Blades/New Jersey Knights (1973–74)	30–17–4
52	W	February 8, 1974	6–2	@ Edmonton Oilers (1973–74)	31–17–4
53	T	February 10, 1974	2–2	@ Winnipeg Jets (1973–74)	31–17–5
54	W	February 12, 1974	3–1	@ Minnesota Fighting Saints (1973–74)	32–17–5
55	W	February 13, 1974	5–1	Winnipeg Jets (1973–74)	33–17–5
56	W	February 15, 1974	6–4	@ Los Angeles Sharks (1973–74)	34–17–5
57	L	February 17, 1974	1–6	Minnesota Fighting Saints (1973–74)	34–18–5
58	W	February 20, 1974	7–2	New York Golden Blades/New Jersey Knights (1973–74)	35–18–5
59	W	February 23, 1974	5–2	Edmonton Oilers (1973–74)	36–18–5
60	W	February 24, 1974	7–1	Vancouver Blazers (1973–74)	37–18–5
61	W	February 26, 1974	3–2	Vancouver Blazers (1973–74)	38–18–5
62	W	February 28, 1974	9–4	@ Chicago Cougars (1973–74)	39–18–5

March: 7–7–0, 14 points (home: 3–3–0; road: 4–4–0)

Game	Result	Date	Score	Opponent	Record
63	L	March 1, 1974	2–5	@ Edmonton Oilers (1973–74)	39–19–5
64	L	March 3, 1974	3–6	New England Whalers (1973–74)	39–20–5
65	L	March 6, 1974	2–4	Edmonton Oilers (1973–74)	39–21–5
66	W	March 9, 1974	4–2	Toronto Toros (1973–74)	40–21–5
67	W	March 12, 1974	3–2	Minnesota Fighting Saints (1973–74)	41–21–5
68	W	March 14, 1974	6–0	@ Los Angeles Sharks (1973–74)	42–21–5
69	W	March 17, 1974	4–3	Cleveland Crusaders (1973–74)	43–21–5
70	W	March 20, 1974	5–4	@ Cleveland Crusaders (1973–74)	44–21–5
71	L	March 21, 1974	3–6	@ Toronto Toros (1973–74)	44–22–5
72	W	March 22, 1974	4–2	@ Winnipeg Jets (1973–74)	45–22–5
73	L	March 24, 1974	3–5	Minnesota Fighting Saints (1973–74)	45–23–5
74	W	March 27, 1974	8–1	@ Vancouver Blazers (1973–74)	46–23–5
75	L	March 29, 1974	5–7	@ Winnipeg Jets (1973–74)	46–24–5
76	L	March 31, 1974	2–5	@ Minnesota Fighting Saints (1973–74)	46–25–5

April: 2–0–0, 4 points (home: 1–0–0; road: 1–0–0)

Game	Result	Date	Score	Opponent	Record
77	W	April 1, 1974	4–1	@ New England Whalers (1973–74)	47–25–5
78	W	April 3, 1974	3–1	Chicago Cougars (1973–74)	48–25–5

Legend: Win (2 points) Loss (0 points) Tie (1 point)

== Playoffs ==
The Aeros defeated the Winnipeg Jets in the Division semi-final 4–0. In the Division final, the Aeros defeated the Minnesota Fighting Saints 4–2 to advance to the Avco Cup final. The Aeros would sweep the Chicago Cougars to win their first WHA championship.

1974 Avco Cup playoffs
Quarterfinals vs. Winnipeg Jets – Aeros win 4–0

Game	Date	Visitor	Score	Home	Series
1	April 8	Houston Aeros	5–2	Winnipeg Jets	1–0
2	April 10	Houston Aeros	3–2	Winnipeg Jets	2–0
3	April 13	Winnipeg Jets	1–10	Houston Aeros	3–0
4	April 14	Winnipeg Jets	4–5	Houston Aeros	4–0

Semifinals vs. Minnesota Fighting Saints – Aeros win 4–2

Game	Date	Visitor	Score	Home	Series
1	April 18	Minnesota Fighting Saints	5–4 OT	Houston Aeros	0–1
2	April 20	Minnesota Fighting Saints	2–5	Houston Aeros	1–1
3	April 21	Houston Aeros	1–4	Minnesota Fighting Saints	1–2
4	April 28	Houston Aeros	4–1	Minnesota Fighting Saints	2–2
5	April 29	Minnesota Fighting Saints	4–9	Houston Aeros	3–2
6	May 1	Houston Aeros	3–1	Minnesota Fighting Saints	4–2

Avco Cup Finals vs. Chicago Cougars – Aeros win 4–0

Game	Date	Visitor	Score	Home	Series
1	May 12	Houston Aeros	3–2	Chicago Cougars	1–0
2	May 15	Houston Aeros	6–1	Chicago Cougars	2–0
3	May 17	Chicago Cougars	4–7	Houston Aeros	3–0
4	May 19	Chicago Cougars	2–6	Houston Aeros	4–0

Legend: Win Loss

== Player statistics ==
Scoring

Regular season
Player	Pos	GP	G	A	Pts	PIM	+/-	PPG	SHG	GWG
Gordie Howe	RW	70	31	69	100	46	0	9	3	5
Larry Lund	C	75	33	53	86	109	0	7	2	10
Frank Hughes	LW	73	42	42	84	47	0	13	0	3
Andre Hinse	LW	69	24	56	80	39	0	10	0	3
Mark Howe	LW	76	38	41	79	20	0	5	5	3
Murray Hall	RW	78	30	28	58	25	0	8	2	5
Jim Sherrit	C	76	30	28	58	18	0	4	0	2
Gord Labossiere	C	67	19	36	55	30	0	4	0	4
Poul Popiel	D	78	7	41	48	126	0	1	0	0
Ted Taylor	LW	75	21	23	44	143	0	1	3	3
John Schella	D	73	12	19	31	170	0	0	2	3
Don Grierson	RW	65	11	18	29	45	0	0	0	2
Marty Howe	D	73	4	20	24	90	0	0	0	1
Gordon Kannegiesser	D	78	0	20	20	26	0	0	0	0
Larry Hale	D	69	2	14	16	39	0	0	0	0
Joe Szura	C	42	8	7	15	4	0	0	0	3
Gary Williamson	LW	9	2	6	8	0	0	1	0	0
Jack Stanfield	LW	41	1	3	4	2	0	1	0	0
Bill Prentice	D	55	1	2	3	35	0	0	0	0
Don McLeod	G	49	0	3	3	6	0	0	0	0
Ed Hoekstra	C	19	2	0	2	0	0	0	0	1
Wayne Rutledge	G	25	0	1	1	14	0	0	0	0
Ron Grahame	G	4	0	0	0	0	0	0	0	0

Goaltending
Player	GP	MIN	W	L	T	GA	GAA	SO
Don McLeod	2971	49	33	13	3	127	2.56	3
Wayne Rutledge	1509	25	12	12	1	84	3.34	0
Ron Grahame	250	4	3	0	1	5	1.20	1
Team:	4730	78	48	25	5	216	2.74	4

=== Postseason ===
Player	Pos	GP	G	A	Pts	PIM	PPG	SHG	GWG
Larry Lund	C	14	9	14	23	56	0	0	1
Mark Howe	D	14	9	10	19	4	0	0	1
Andre Hinse	LW	14	8	9	17	18	0	0	1
Gordie Howe	RW	13	3	14	17	34	0	0	1
Gord Labossiere	C	14	7	9	16	20	0	0	2
Murray Hall	RW	14	9	6	15	6	0	0	3
Poul Popiel	D	14	1	14	15	22	0	0	0
Frank Hughes	LW	14	9	5	14	9	0	0	1
Jim Sherrit	C	14	5	7	12	2	0	0	1
Ted Taylor	LW	14	4	8	12	60	0	0	0
John Schella	D	14	2	6	8	42	0	0	0
Don Grierson	RW	14	1	5	6	23	0	0	0
Marty Howe	D	14	1	5	6	31	0	0	0
Larry Hale	D	14	3	2	5	6	0	0	1
Gordon Kannegiesser	D	3	0	2	2	2	0	0	0
Don McLeod	G	14	0	0	0	2	0	0	0
Bill Prentice	D	10	0	0	0	5	0	0	0
Jack Stanfield	LW	7	0	0	0	2	0	0	0
Joe Szura	C	10	0	0	0	0	0	0	0
Gary Williamson	LW	12	0	0	0	0	0	0	0

Player	MIN	GP	W	L	GA	GAA	SO
Don McLeod	842	14	12	2	35	2.49	0
Team:	842	14	12	2	35	2.49	0

Note: Pos = Position; GP = Games played; G = Goals; A = Assists; Pts = Points; +/- = plus/minus; PIM = Penalty minutes; PPG = Power-play goals; SHG = Short-handed goals; GWG = Game-winning goals
MIN = Minutes played; W = Wins; L = Losses; T = Ties; GA = Goals-against; GAA = Goals-against average; SO = Shutouts;

== Awards and records ==
- Gordie Howe, Gary L. Davidson Award (Most Valuable Player)
- Mark Howe, Lou Kaplan Trophy (Rookie of the Year)
- Don McLeod, Ben Hatskin Trophy (Best Goaltender)
- Gordie Howe, WHA All-Star Team (First Team)
- Don McLeod, WHA All-Star Team (First Team)
- Mark Howe, WHA All-Star Team (Second Team)

=== 1974 WHA All-Star Game (January 3, 1974) ===
- Poul Popiel
- Larry Lund
- Gordie Howe
- Frank Hughes

== Draft picks ==
Houston's draft picks at the 1973 WHA Amateur Draft.

Round	#	Player	Nationality	College/Junior/Club team (League)
1	9	Darcy Rota (F)	Canada	Edmonton Oil Kings (WCHL)
2	23	Tom Lysiak (F)	Canada	Medicine Hat Tigers (WCHL)
3	35	Vic Mercredi (LW)	Canada	New Westminster Bruins (WCHL)
4	48	Don Cutts (G)	Canada	R.P.I. (ECAC)
5	61	Paul O'Neil (C)	United States	Boston University (ECAC)
6	74	Dennis Owchar (D)	Canada	Toronto Marlboros (OHA)
7	87	Dan Hinton (F)	Canada	Sault Ste. Marie Greyhounds (OHA)
8	99	Lee Palmer (D)	Canada	Clarkson University (ECAC)
9	110	Sean Shanahan (LW)	Canada	Providence College (ECAC)

== See also ==
- 1973–74 WHA season
