= 1973–74 Vancouver Blazers season =

World Hockey Association team season

1973–74 Vancouver Blazers
- Division: 5th Western
- 1973–74 record: 27–50–1
- Home record: 19–20–0
- Road record: 8–30–1
- Goals for: 278
- Goals against: 345

Team information
- General manager: Phil Watson
- Coach: John McKenzie (3–4–0); Phil Watson (3–9–0); Andy Bathgate (21–37–1)
- Alternate captains: Bryan Campbell; Ron Plumb; Danny Lawson; Jim Cardiff
- Arena: Pacific Coliseum
- Average attendance: 9,356 (60.1%)

Team leaders
- Goals: Danny Lawson (50)
- Assists: Bryan Campbell (62)
- Points: Bryan Campbell (89)
- Penalty minutes: Colin Campbell (191)
- Wins: Peter Donnelly (22)
- Goals against average: Peter Donnelly (3.80)

The 1973–74 Vancouver Blazers season was the second season of operation for the World Hockey Association (WHA) franchise. The team had operated in Philadelphia the previous season before moving to Vancouver. The Blazers did not qualify for the playoffs.

== Regular season ==
=== Final standings ===
Western Division
	GP	W	L	T	GF	GA	PIM	Pts
Houston Aeros	78	48	25	5	318	219	1038	101
Minnesota Fighting Saints	78	44	32	2	332	275	1243	90
Edmonton Oilers	78	38	37	3	268	269	1273	79
Winnipeg Jets	78	34	39	5	264	296	673	73
Vancouver Blazers	78	27	50	1	278	345	1047	55
Los Angeles Sharks	78	25	53	0	239	339	1086	50

== Schedule and results ==
1973–74 regular season
October

Game	Result	Date	Score	Opponent	Record
1	W	October 10, 1973	4–3 OT	Winnipeg Jets (1973–74)	1–0–0
2	L	October 12, 1973	4–5	@ Minnesota Fighting Saints (1973–74)	1–1–0
3	L	October 14, 1973	3–6	@ Winnipeg Jets (1973–74)	1–2–0
4	L	October 17, 1973	2–7	Houston Aeros (1973–74)	1–3–0
5	W	October 19, 1973	3–1	@ Edmonton Oilers (1973–74)	2–3–0
6	W	October 20, 1973	4–3	Chicago Cougars (1973–74)	3–3–0
7	L	October 21, 1973	1–4	Los Angeles Sharks (1973–74)	3–4–0
8	L	October 24, 1973	4–7	Toronto Toros (1973–74)	3–5–0
9	L	October 27, 1973	2–6	Edmonton Oilers (1973–74)	3–6–0
10	L	October 28, 1973	5–7	@ Edmonton Oilers (1973–74)	3–7–0
11	L	October 31, 1973	1–5	Quebec Nordiques (1973–74)	3–8–0

November

Game	Result	Date	Score	Opponent	Record
12	L	November 3, 1973	0–4	New York Golden Blades/New Jersey Knights (1973–74)	3–9–0
13	L	November 4, 1973	3–4	New York Golden Blades/New Jersey Knights (1973–74)	3–10–0
14	L	November 7, 1973	1–3	Los Angeles Sharks (1973–74)	3–11–0
15	L	November 9, 1973	1–3	@ Minnesota Fighting Saints (1973–74)	3–12–0
16	L	November 10, 1973	3–8	@ Houston Aeros (1973–74)	3–13–0
17	W	November 13, 1973	5–3	Winnipeg Jets (1973–74)	4–13–0
18	W	November 15, 1973	7–5	Minnesota Fighting Saints (1973–74)	5–13–0
19	W	November 18, 1973	8–2	Cleveland Crusaders (1973–74)	6–13–0
20	W	November 22, 1973	7–1	Edmonton Oilers (1973–74)	7–13–0
21	W	November 23, 1973	4–3 OT	@ Winnipeg Jets (1973–74)	8–13–0
22	L	November 25, 1973	2–3	@ Toronto Toros (1973–74)	8–14–0
23	W	November 28, 1973	5–3	Minnesota Fighting Saints (1973–74)	9–14–0

December

Game	Result	Date	Score	Opponent	Record
24	L	December 5, 1973	1–3	Toronto Toros (1973–74)	9–15–0
25	L	December 7, 1973	1–3	@ Minnesota Fighting Saints (1973–74)	9–16–0
26	L	December 9, 1973	3–5	Houston Aeros (1973–74)	9–17–0
27	W	December 12, 1973	2–1 OT	Quebec Nordiques (1973–74)	10–17–0
28	W	December 15, 1973	6–4	Los Angeles Sharks (1973–74)	11–17–0
29	L	December 16, 1973	3–5	@ Los Angeles Sharks (1973–74)	11–18–0
30	W	December 18, 1973	5–2	@ Los Angeles Sharks (1973–74)	12–18–0
31	L	December 19, 1973	2–4	Minnesota Fighting Saints (1973–74)	12–19–0
32	L	December 21, 1973	1–4	@ Edmonton Oilers (1973–74)	12–20–0
33	W	December 22, 1973	6–3	Edmonton Oilers (1973–74)	13–20–0
34	L	December 24, 1973	4–5 OT	@ New England Whalers (1973–74)	13–21–0
35	W	December 26, 1973	5–3	@ Cleveland Crusaders (1973–74)	14–21–0
36	L	December 28, 1973	3–5	@ New York Golden Blades/New Jersey Knights (1973–74)	14–22–0
37	W	December 30, 1973	6–5 OT	New England Whalers (1973–74)	15–22–0

January

Game	Result	Date	Score	Opponent	Record
38	L	January 1, 1974	4–5	@ Chicago Cougars (1973–74)	15–23–0
39	L	January 5, 1974	2–5	@ Quebec Nordiques (1973–74)	15–24–0
40	L	January 6, 1974	3–11	@ Cleveland Crusaders (1973–74)	15–25–0
41	W	January 7, 1974	5–4	@ New York Golden Blades/New Jersey Knights (1973–74)	16–25–0
42	L	January 9, 1974	4–6	Winnipeg Jets (1973–74)	16–26–0
43	W	January 13, 1974	6–2	Edmonton Oilers (1973–74)	17–26–0
44	L	January 17, 1974	4–7	@ Houston Aeros (1973–74)	17–27–0
45	L	January 19, 1974	4–5 OT	New York Golden Blades/New Jersey Knights (1973–74)	17–28–0
46	W	January 20, 1974	3–0	@ Los Angeles Sharks (1973–74)	18–28–0
47	W	January 23, 1974	6–3	Cleveland Crusaders (1973–74)	19–28–0
48	L	January 26, 1974	2–4	Houston Aeros (1973–74)	19–29–0
49	L	January 27, 1974	7–9	@ Toronto Toros (1973–74)	19–30–0
50	L	January 28, 1974	4–6	@ New England Whalers (1973–74)	19–31–0
51	L	January 30, 1974	2–4	Chicago Cougars (1973–74)	19–32–0

February

Game	Result	Date	Score	Opponent	Record
52	W	February 5, 1974	8–0	Edmonton Oilers (1973–74)	20–32–0
53	W	February 8, 1974	7–3	Quebec Nordiques (1973–74)	21–32–0
54	W	February 13, 1974	9–4	New England Whalers (1973–74)	22–32–0
55	W	February 17, 1974	4–0	@ Los Angeles Sharks (1973–74)	23–32–0
56	L	February 19, 1974	4–5 OT	Toronto Toros (1973–74)	23–33–0
57	L	February 21, 1974	4–5	@ Chicago Cougars (1973–74)	23–34–0
58	L	February 23, 1974	3–7	@ Cleveland Crusaders (1973–74)	23–35–0
59	L	February 24, 1974	1–7	@ Houston Aeros (1973–74)	23–36–0
60	L	February 26, 1974	2–3	@ Houston Aeros (1973–74)	23–37–0
61	L	February 28, 1974	4–9	@ Quebec Nordiques (1973–74)	23–38–0

March

Game	Result	Date	Score	Opponent	Record
62	L	March 2, 1974	1–7	@ New England Whalers (1973–74)	23–39–0
63	L	March 4, 1974	6–7 OT	@ New York Golden Blades/New Jersey Knights (1973–74)	23–40–0
64	L	March 7, 1974	2–4	Cleveland Crusaders (1973–74)	23–41–0
65	W	March 10, 1974	2–1 OT	@ Edmonton Oilers (1973–74)	24–41–0
66	W	March 13, 1974	5–2	Los Angeles Sharks (1973–74)	25–41–0
67	L	March 14, 1974	3–6	New England Whalers (1973–74)	25–42–0
68	L	March 15, 1974	5–7	@ Winnipeg Jets (1973–74)	25–43–0
69	L	March 17, 1974	2–3	@ Edmonton Oilers (1973–74)	25–44–0
70	W	March 19, 1974	5–4	Minnesota Fighting Saints (1973–74)	26–44–0
71	T	March 21, 1974	5–5	@ Chicago Cougars (1973–74)	26–44–1
72	L	March 23, 1974	2–6	@ Quebec Nordiques (1973–74)	26–45–1
73	L	March 24, 1974	1–3	@ Toronto Toros (1973–74)	26–46–1
74	L	March 27, 1974	1–8	Houston Aeros (1973–74)	26–47–1
75	L	March 29, 1974	2–5	Chicago Cougars (1973–74)	26–48–1
76	L	March 31, 1974	3–4 OT	@ Winnipeg Jets (1973–74)	26–49–1

April

Game	Result	Date	Score	Opponent	Record
77	L	April 3, 1974	0–9	@ Minnesota Fighting Saints (1973–74)	26–50–1
78	W	April 4, 1974	4–2	Winnipeg Jets (1973–74)	27–50–1

Legend: Win (2 points) Loss (0 points) Tie (1 point)

== Player statistics ==
Regular season
Scoring

Player	Pos	GP	G	A	Pts	PIM	+/-	PPG	SHG	GWG
Bryan Campbell	C	76	27	62	89	50	0	8	1	3
Danny Lawson	RW	78	50	38	88	14	0	10	0	5
Claude St. Sauveur	C	70	38	30	68	55	0	6	2	5
Don Burgess	LW	78	30	36	66	8	0	5	3	3
John McKenzie	RW	45	14	38	52	71	0	3	0	0
John Migneault	LW	74	21	26	47	27	0	2	0	2
Murray Myers	RW	61	22	20	42	28	0	2	0	3
Ron Plumb	D	75	6	32	38	40	0	1	0	1
Jim Adair	C	70	12	17	29	10	0	2	0	2
Rob Walton	C	28	8	15	23	2	0	1	0	0
Colin Campbell	D	78	3	20	23	191	0	0	0	0
Jim Cardiff	D	78	1	21	22	188	0	1	0	0
Mike Chernoff	LW	36	11	10	21	4	0	0	1	1
Ralph MacSweyn	D	56	2	18	20	52	0	0	0	0
Denis Meloche	C	41	6	13	19	18	0	1	0	0
Ed Hatoum	RW	37	3	12	15	8	0	0	0	0
Don O'Donoghue	RW	49	8	6	14	20	0	0	0	1
Dave Hutchison	D	69	0	13	13	151	0	0	0	0
Serge Beaudoin	D	26	1	11	12	37	0	0	0	0
Sam Gellard	LW	23	7	4	11	15	0	3	0	0
Jimmy Jones	RW	18	3	2	5	23	0	2	0	0
Michel Plante	LW	22	3	2	5	2	0	0	0	1
Camille Lapierre	D	9	0	3	3	0	0	0	0	0
Jean Tetreault	LW	6	1	1	2	0	0	0	0	0
Ron Ward	C	7	0	2	2	2	0	0	0	0
Michel Boudreau	C	3	1	0	1	0	0	0	0	0
Pete Donnelly	G	49	0	1	1	9	0	0	0	0
Irv Spencer	D	19	0	1	1	6	0	0	0	0
Yves Archambault	G	5	0	0	0	0	0	0	0	0
Rychard Campeau	D	7	0	0	0	2	0	0	0	0
George Gardner	G	28	0	0	0	0	0	0	0	0
Peter McNamee	D	3	0	0	0	0	0	0	0	0
Danny Sullivan	G	1	0	0	0	0	0	0	0	0

Goaltending

Player	MIN	GP	W	L	T	GA	GAA	SO
Pete Donnelly	2824	49	22	24	0	179	3.80	3
George Gardner	1590	28	4	21	1	125	4.72	0
Yves Archambault	263	5	1	4	0	27	6.16	0
Danny Sullivan	60	1	0	1	0	7	7.00	0
Team:	4737	78	27	50	1	338	4.28	3

Note: Pos = Position; GP = Games played; G = Goals; A = Assists; Pts = Points; +/- = plus/minus; PIM = Penalty minutes; PPG = Power-play goals; SHG = Short-handed goals; GWG = Game-winning goals
MIN = Minutes played; W = Wins; L = Losses; T = Ties; GA = Goals-against; GAA = Goals-against average; SO = Shutouts;

== Draft picks ==
Vancouver's draft picks at the 1973 WHA Amateur Draft.

Round	#	Player	Nationality	College/Junior/Club team (League)
1	5	Colin Campbell (D)	Canada	Peterborough Petes (OHA)
2	19	Brent Leavins (F)	Canada	Swift Current Broncos (WCHL)
3	31	Ed Humphreys (G)	Canada	Saskatoon Blades (WCHL)
4	44	Jean Tetreault (F)	Canada	Drummondville Rangers (QMJHL)
5	57	Jimmy Jones (RW)	Canada	Peterborough Petes (OHA)
6	70	Ian Turnbull (D)	Canada	Ottawa 67's (OHA)
7	83	Mike Korney (D)	Canada	Winnipeg Jets (WCHL)
8	96	Andre St. Laurent (C)	Canada	Montreal Red White and Blue (QMJHL)
9	107	Pierre Laganiere (RW)	Canada	Sherbrooke Castors (QMJHL)
10	117	Brian Molvik (D)	Canada	Calgary Centennials (WCHL)

== See also ==
- 1973–74 WHA season
