= Ralph Hopiavuori =

Canadian ice hockey player

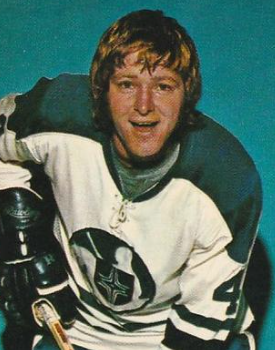
- Hopiavuori in 1972–73
- Born: July 15, 1951 (age 73); Kirkland Lake, Ontario, Canada
- Height: 6 ft 2 in (188 cm)
- Weight: 190 lb (86 kg; 13 st 8 lb)
- Position: Defence
- Shot: Left
- Played for: Cleveland Crusaders; Indianapolis Racers
- NHL draft: 30th overall, 1971; Toronto Maple Leafs
- Playing career: 1971–1981

Ralph Hopiavuori (born July 15, 1951) is a Canadian former professional ice hockey player who played in the World Hockey Association (WHA). Hopiavuori played parts of three WHA seasons with the Cleveland Crusaders and Indianapolis Racers. He was drafted in the third round of the 1971 NHL Amateur Draft by the Toronto Maple Leafs. Hopiavuori was born in Kirkland Lake, Ontario.

Hopiavuori is of Finnish descent.

== Career statistics ==
			Regular season					Playoffs
Season	Team	League	GP	G	A	Pts	PIM	GP	G	A	Pts	PIM
1968–69	Kitchener Rangers	OHA-Jr.	4	1	0	1	4	—	—	—	—	—
1969–70	Kitchener Rangers	OHA-Jr.	42	3	17	20	94	—	—	—	—	—
1970–71	Kitchener Rangers	OHA-Jr.	15	1	7	8	68	—	—	—	—	—
1970–71	Toronto Marlboros	OHA-Jr.	24	4	11	15	69	—	—	—	—	—
1971–72	Port Huron Wings	IHL	45	3	12	15	134	15	1	2	3	13
1972–73	Cleveland Crusaders	WHA	29	4	5	9	44	8	0	1	1	6
1973–74	Cleveland Crusaders	WHA	13	0	2	2	6	4	0	1	1	0
1973–74	Jacksonville Barons	AHL	46	3	19	22	42	—	—	—	—	—
1974–75	Indianapolis Racers	WHA	28	2	8	10	21	—	—	—	—	—
1974–75	Mohawk Valley Comets	NAHL-Sr.	4	2	0	2	6	—	—	—	—	—
1974–75	Roanoke Valley Rebels	SHL-Sr.	13	4	6	10	6	2	0	1	1	0
1975–76	Mohawk Valley Comets	NAHL-Sr.	15	4	4	8	12	—	—	—	—	—
1976–77	Cambridge Hornets	OHA-Sr.	20	6	11	17	16	—	—	—	—	—
1977–78	Cambridge Hornets	OHA-Sr.	16	10	6	16	52	—	—	—	—	—
1979–80	Cambridge Hornets	OHA-Sr.	—	—	—	—	—	—	—	—	—	—
WHA totals			70	6	15	21	71	12	0	2	2	6
