= 1973–74 Winnipeg Jets season =

NHA hockey team season

1973–74 Winnipeg Jets
- League: 9th place WHA
- Division: 4th Western
- 1973–74 record: 34–39–5
- Home record: 26–11–2
- Road record: 8–28–3
- Goals for: 264
- Goals against: 296

Team information
- General manager: Annis Stukus
- Coach: Bobby Hull; Nick Mickoski
- Captain: Ab McDonald
- Alternate captains: Danny Johnson; Larry Hornung
- Arena: Winnipeg Arena
- Average attendance: 6,401 (63.5%)

Team leaders
- Goals: Bobby Hull (53)
- Assists: Chris Bordeleau (49)
- Points: Bobby Hull (95)
- Penalty minutes: Duke Asmundson (85)
- Wins: Joe Daley (19)
- Goals against average: Ernie Wakely (3.27)

The 1973–74 Winnipeg Jets season was their second season in the World Hockey Association (WHA).

== Regular season ==
=== Season standings ===
Western Division	GP	W	L	T	Pts	GF	GA	PIM
Houston Aeros	78	48	25	5	101	318	219	1038
Minnesota Fighting Saints	78	44	32	2	90	332	275	1243
Edmonton Oilers	78	38	37	3	79	268	269	1273
Winnipeg Jets	78	34	39	5	73	264	296	673
Vancouver Blazers	78	27	50	1	55	278	345	1047
Los Angeles Sharks	78	25	53	0	50	239	339	1086

== Schedule and results ==
1973–74 regular season
October: 4–5–1, 9 points (home: 2–0–1; road: 2–5–0)

Game	Result	Date	Score	Opponent	Record
1	L	October 10, 1973	3–4 OT	@ Vancouver Blazers	0–1–0
2	L	October 12, 1973	4–6	@ Edmonton Oilers	0–2–0
3	W	October 14, 1973	6–3	Vancouver Blazers	1–2–0
4	W	October 17, 1973	3–1	@ New England Whalers	2–2–0
5	W	October 18, 1973	6–1	@ New York Golden Blades	3–2–0
6	W	October 21, 1973	2–1 OT	Minnesota Fighting Saints	4–2–0
7	T	October 26, 1973	3–3	Toronto Toros	4–2–1
8	L	October 27, 1973	2–5	@ Minnesota Fighting Saints	4–3–1
9	L	October 30, 1973	1–4	@ Chicago Cougars	4–4–1
10	L	October 31, 1973	4–6	@ Cleveland Crusaders	4–5–1

November: 5–8–2, 12 points (home: 5–2–0; road: 0–6–2)

Game	Result	Date	Score	Opponent	Record
11	W	November 2, 1973	3–1	New York Golden Blades	5–5–1
12	W	November 4, 1973	8–2	Quebec Nordiques	6–5–1
13	T	November 6, 1973	2–2	@ Quebec Nordiques	6–5–2
14	L	November 7, 1973	2–9	@ New England Whalers	6–6–2
15	L	November 10, 1973	2–4	@ Cleveland Crusaders	6–7–2
16	W	November 11, 1973	6–2	Los Angeles Sharks	7–7–2
17	L	November 13, 1973	3–5	@ Vancouver Blazers	7–8–2
18	W	November 16, 1973	3–1	Edmonton Oilers	8–8–2
19	L	November 18, 1973	2–6	@ Toronto Toros	8–9–2
20	W	November 21, 1973	6–2	Cleveland Crusaders	9–9–2
21	L	November 23, 1973	3–4 OT	Vancouver Blazers	9–10–2
22	L	November 25, 1973	3–5	@ Minnesota Fighting Saints	9–11–2
23	L	November 27, 1973	4–5 OT	@ Los Angeles Sharks	9–12–2
24	T	November 28, 1973	4–4	@ Houston Aeros	9–12–3
25	L	November 30, 1973	2–5	Los Angeles Sharks	9–13–3

December: 8–5–1, 17 points (home: 6–2–0; road: 2–3–1)

Game	Result	Date	Score	Opponent	Record
26	W	December 2, 1973	5–3	Quebec Nordiques	10–13–3
27	W	December 5, 1973	3–1	Edmonton Oilers	11–13–3
28	W	December 7, 1973	7–4	Toronto Toros	12–13–3
29	W	December 9, 1973	3–1	Jersey Knights	13–13–3
30	L	December 12, 1973	2–3	Houston Aeros	13–14–3
31	W	December 14, 1973	1–0	Los Angeles Sharks	14–14–3
32	L	December 16, 1973	2–3	Minnesota Fighting Saints	14–15–3
33	T	December 18, 1973	3–3	@ Chicago Cougars	14–15–4
34	L	December 19, 1973	0–10	@ Houston Aeros	14–16–4
35	W	December 22, 1973	2–0	@ New England Whalers	15–16–4
36	L	December 23, 1973	3–6	@ Jersey Knights	15–17–4
37	W	December 26, 1973	4–2	Chicago Cougars	16–17–4
38	W	December 29, 1973	4–3	@ Quebec Nordiques	17–17–4
39	L	December 30, 1973	2–5	@ Toronto Toros	17–18–4

January: 7–4–0, 14 points (home: 4–1–0; road: 3–3–0)

Game	Result	Date	Score	Opponent	Record
40	W	January 1, 1974	4–3 OT	@ Edmonton Oilers	18–18–4
41	L	January 4, 1974	3–4	New England Whalers	18–19–4
42	L	January 6, 1974	1–7	@ Houston Aeros	18–20–4
43	L	January 8, 1974	1–4	@ Los Angeles Sharks	18–21–4
44	W	January 9, 1974	6–4	@ Vancouver Blazers	19–21–4
45	W	January 11, 1974	7–4	Edmonton Oilers	20–21–4
46	W	January 13, 1974	3–1	Chicago Cougars	21–21–4
47	W	January 18, 1974	7–3	Cleveland Crusaders	22–21–4
48	W	January 20, 1974	9–3	Jersey Knights	23–21–4
49	W	January 25, 1974	4–3	@ Edmonton Oilers	24–21–4
50	L	January 27, 1974	2–12	@ Minnesota Fighting Saints	24–22–4

February: 5–8–1, 11 points (home: 4–2–1; road: 1–6–0)

Game	Result	Date	Score	Opponent	Record
51	W	February 1, 1974	4–0	Los Angeles Sharks	25–22–4
52	W	February 3, 1974	4–2	Chicago Cougars	26–22–4
53	L	February 5, 1974	1–3	@ Chicago Cougars	26–23–4
54	L	February 8, 1974	3–4 OT	Minnesota Fighting Saints	26–24–4
55	T	February 10, 1974	2–2	Houston Aeros	26–24–5
56	W	February 12, 1974	4–2	@ Los Angeles Sharks	27–24–5
57	L	February 13, 1974	1–5	@ Houston Aeros	27–25–5
58	L	February 15, 1974	1–7	@ Minnesota Fighting Saints	27–26–5
59	L	February 17, 1974	2–3 OT	New England Whalers	27–27–5
60	L	February 20, 1974	1–4	@ Edmonton Oilers	27–28–5
61	W	February 22, 1974	4–3	Toronto Toros	28–28–5
62	W	February 24, 1974	3–1	Chicago Cougars	29–28–5
63	L	February 26, 1974	1–7	@ Quebec Nordiques	29–29–5
64	L	February 28, 1974	0–3	@ Toronto Toros	29–30–5

March: 5–7–0, 10 points (home: 5–3–0; road: 0–4–0)

Game	Result	Date	Score	Opponent	Record
65	L	March 1, 1974	0–4	Minnesota Fighting Saints	29–31–5
66	W	March 3, 1974	8–6	Quebec Nordiques	30–31–5
67	L	March 8, 1974	1–4	Cleveland Crusaders	30–32–5
68	L	March 9, 1974	4–5 OT	@ Chicago Cougars	30–33–5
69	L	March 11, 1974	2–10	@ Jersey Knights	30–34–5
70	L	March 13, 1974	3–4	@ Cleveland Crusaders	30–35–5
71	W	March 15, 1974	7–5	Vancouver Blazers	31–35–5
72	W	March 17, 1974	10–1	New England Whalers	32–35–5
73	L	March 22, 1974	2–4	Houston Aeros	32–36–5
74	L	March 24, 1974	3–6	@ Los Angeles Sharks	32–37–5
75	W	March 29, 1974	7–5	Houston Aeros	33–37–5
76	W	March 31, 1974	4–3 OT	Vancouver Blazers	34–37–5

April: 0–2–0 (home: 0–1–0; road: 0–1–0)

Game	Result	Date	Score	Opponent	Record
77	L	April 3, 1974	5–6 OT	Edmonton Oilers	34–38–5
78	L	April 4, 1974	2–4	@ Vancouver Blazers	34–39–5

Legend: Win (2 points) Loss (0 points) Tie (1 point)

== Playoffs ==
1974 Avco Cup playoffs
Quarterfinals vs. (W1) Houston Aeros – Aeros win 4–0

Game	Date	Visitor	Score	Home	Series
1	April 8	Houston Aeros	5–2	Winnipeg Jets	0–1
2	April 10	Houston Aeros	3–2	Winnipeg Jets	0–2
3	April 13	Winnipeg Jets	1–10	Houston Aeros	0–3
4	April 14	Winnipeg Jets	4–5	Houston Aeros	0–4

Legend: Win Loss

== Player statistics ==
=== Forwards ===
Note: GP= Games played; G= Goals; A= Assists; PTS = Points; PIM = Points

Player	GP	G	A	PTS	PIM
Bobby Hull	75	53	42	95	38
Chris Bordeleau	75	26	49	75	22
Fran Huck	74	26	48	74	68
Norm Beaudin	74	27	28	55	8
Ron Snell	70	24	25	49	32
Dan Johnson	78	16	21	37	20
Jean-Guy Gratton	68	12	21	33	13
Ab McDonald	70	12	17	29	8
Dan Spring	66	8	16	24	8
Ted Hargreaves	74	7	12	19	15
Freeman Asmundson	72	5	14	19	85
Dunc Rousseau	60	10	8	18	39
Milt Black	47	6	9	15	14
Kelly Pratt	46	4	6	10	50
Cal Swenson	25	5	4	9	2
Bill Sutherland	12	4	5	9	6
Garth Rizzuto	41	3	4	7	8

=== Defencemen ===
Note: GP= Games played; G= Goals; A= Assists; PTS = Points; PIM = Points

Player	GP	G	A	PTS	PIM
Bob Woytowich	72	6	28	34	43
Joe Zanussi	76	3	22	25	53
Larry Hornung	51	4	19	23	18
Bob Ash	60	2	18	20	30
Ken Stephanson	29	0	7	7	24
Jim Hargreaves	53	1	4	5	50

=== Goaltending ===
Note: GP= Games played; MIN= Minutes; W= Wins; L= Losses; T = Ties; SO = Shutouts; GAA = Goals against

Player	GP	MIN	W	L	T	SO	GAA
Ernie Wakely	37	2254	15	18	4	3	3.27
Joe Daley	41	2454	19	20	1	0	3.99
Bill Holden	1	60	0	1	0	0	4.00

== Draft picks ==
Winnipeg's draft picks at the 1973 WHA Amateur Draft.

Round	#	Player	Nationality	College/Junior/Club team (League)
1	11	Ron Andruff (C)	Canada	Flin Flon Bombers (WCHL)
2	25	Keith Mackie (D)	Canada	Edmonton Oil Kings (WCHL)
3	37	Kelly Pratt (RW)	Canada	Swift Current Broncos (WCHL)
5	63	Randy Smith (LW)	Canada	Edmonton Oil Kings (WCHL)
6	76	Ron Kennedy (RW)	Canada	New Westminster Bruins (WCHL)
7	89	Jeff Jacques (RW)	Canada	St. Catharines Black Hawks (OHA)
8	101	Terry McDougall (C)	Canada	Swift Current Broncos (WCHL)
9	111	Russ Wiechnik (C)	Canada	Calgary Centennials (WCHL)
10	121	Mike Kennedy (C)	Canada	Kitchener Rangers (OHA)
