= 1973–74 New England Whalers season =

World Hockey Association team season

1973–74 New England Whalers
- Division: 1st East
- 1973–74 record: 43–31–4
- Home record: 26–11–2
- Road record: 17–20–2
- Goals for: 291
- Goals against: 260

Team information
- General manager: Jack Kelley
- Coach: Ron Ryan
- Captain: Ted Green
- Alternate captains: Jim Dorey; Tommy Williams; Larry Pleau
- Arena: Boston Garden (regular season); Eastern States Coliseum (playoffs)
- Average attendance: 5,970 (39.8%)

Team leaders
- Goals: Tom Webster (43)
- Assists: John French (48)
- Points: John French (72)
- Penalty minutes: Rick Ley (148)
- Wins: Al Smith (30)
- Goals against average: Al Smith (3.08)

The 1973–74 New England Whalers season was the second season of the Whalers' franchise. The Whalers qualified for the playoffs for the second-straight season to attempt to defend their championship. They were defeated in the first round by the Chicago Cougars.

== Regular season ==
=== Final standings ===
Eastern Division
	GP	W	L	T	GF	GA	PIM	Pts
New England Whalers	78	43	31	4	291	260	875	90
Toronto Toros	78	41	33	4	304	272	871	86
Cleveland Crusaders	78	37	32	9	266	264	1007	83
Chicago Cougars	78	38	35	5	271	273	1041	81
Quebec Nordiques	78	38	36	4	306	280	909	80
NY Golden Blades / Jersey Knights	78	32	42	4	268	313	933	68

== Schedule and results ==
1973–74 regular season
October

Game	Result	Date	Score	Opponent	Record
1	L	October 7, 1973	2–4	@ Quebec Nordiques (1973–74)	0–1–0
2	W	October 9, 1973	3–2	Quebec Nordiques (1973–74)	1–1–0
3	W	October 13, 1973	6–4	Chicago Cougars (1973–74)	2–1–0
4	W	October 14, 1973	2–1 OT	@ New York Golden Blades/New Jersey Knights (1973–74)	3–1–0
5	T	October 15, 1973	3–3	Minnesota Fighting Saints (1973–74)	3–1–1
6	L	October 17, 1973	1–3	Winnipeg Jets (1973–74)	3–2–1
7	L	October 19, 1973	0–1	@ Minnesota Fighting Saints (1973–74)	3–3–1
8	W	October 21, 1973	4–3	@ Toronto Toros (1973–74)	4–3–1
9	W	October 22, 1973	4–1	New York Golden Blades/New Jersey Knights (1973–74)	5–3–1
10	W	October 25, 1973	8–3	@ New York Golden Blades/New Jersey Knights (1973–74)	6–3–1
11	W	October 27, 1973	3–1	Los Angeles Sharks (1973–74)	7–3–1

November

Game	Result	Date	Score	Opponent	Record
12	L	November 3, 1973	4–5	Toronto Toros (1973–74)	7–4–1
13	W	November 4, 1973	7–5	Cleveland Crusaders (1973–74)	8–4–1
14	W	November 7, 1973	9–2	Winnipeg Jets (1973–74)	9–4–1
15	L	November 10, 1973	3–6	Edmonton Oilers (1973–74)	9–5–1
16	L	November 11, 1973	2–3	@ Quebec Nordiques (1973–74)	9–6–1
17	W	November 12, 1973	3–2 OT	New York Golden Blades/New Jersey Knights (1973–74)	10–6–1
18	W	November 15, 1973	5–3	@ Quebec Nordiques (1973–74)	11–6–1
19	L	November 17, 1973	4–10	Quebec Nordiques (1973–74)	11–7–1
20	W	November 18, 1973	5–2	@ Los Angeles Sharks (1973–74)	12–7–1
21	L	November 21, 1973	1–4	@ Houston Aeros (1973–74)	12–8–1
22	L	November 22, 1973	5–7	@ Minnesota Fighting Saints (1973–74)	12–9–1
23	W	November 26, 1973	4–2	New York Golden Blades/New Jersey Knights (1973–74)	13–9–1
24	W	November 29, 1973	5–2	Houston Aeros (1973–74)	14–9–1

December

Game	Result	Date	Score	Opponent	Record
25	W	December 2, 1973	4–3	Chicago Cougars (1973–74)	15–9–1
26	L	December 8, 1973	1–2 OT	@ Cleveland Crusaders (1973–74)	15–10–1
27	W	December 9, 1973	3–2	Cleveland Crusaders (1973–74)	16–10–1
28	W	December 12, 1973	8–6	Toronto Toros (1973–74)	17–10–1
29	W	December 14, 1973	3–1	New York Golden Blades/New Jersey Knights (1973–74)	18–10–1
30	L	December 16, 1973	2–3	Chicago Cougars (1973–74)	18–11–1
31	W	December 19, 1973	4–2	Edmonton Oilers (1973–74)	19–11–1
32	L	December 22, 1973	0–2	Winnipeg Jets (1973–74)	19–12–1
33	W	December 24, 1973	5–4 OT	Vancouver Blazers (1973–74)	20–12–1
34	W	December 26, 1973	3–2 OT	@ Houston Aeros (1973–74)	21–12–1
35	W	December 27, 1973	5–1	@ Los Angeles Sharks (1973–74)	22–12–1
36	L	December 29, 1973	2–6	@ Edmonton Oilers (1973–74)	22–13–1
37	L	December 30, 1973	5–6 OT	@ Vancouver Blazers (1973–74)	22–14–1

January

Game	Result	Date	Score	Opponent	Record
38	W	January 4, 1974	4–3	@ Winnipeg Jets (1973–74)	23–14–1
39	L	January 5, 1974	0–1	@ Cleveland Crusaders (1973–74)	23–15–1
40	L	January 8, 1974	2–3	Toronto Toros (1973–74)	23–16–1
41	T	January 10, 1974	6–6	@ Toronto Toros (1973–74)	23–16–2
42	W	January 13, 1974	9–6	Los Angeles Sharks (1973–74)	24–16–2
43	W	January 16, 1974	4–2	New York Golden Blades/New Jersey Knights (1973–74)	25–16–2
44	L	January 17, 1974	2–5	Chicago Cougars (1973–74)	25–17–2
45	W	January 19, 1974	5–2	Minnesota Fighting Saints (1973–74)	26–17–2
46	L	January 20, 1974	4–8	@ Toronto Toros (1973–74)	26–18–2
47	L	January 22, 1974	3–5	@ Chicago Cougars (1973–74)	26–19–2
48	W	January 26, 1974	4–0	Cleveland Crusaders (1973–74)	27–19–2
49	W	January 28, 1974	6–4	Vancouver Blazers (1973–74)	28–19–2
50	L	January 31, 1974	1–4	@ New York Golden Blades/New Jersey Knights (1973–74)	28–20–2

February

Game	Result	Date	Score	Opponent	Record
51	W	February 2, 1974	5–2	Houston Aeros (1973–74)	29–20–2
52	L	February 3, 1974	1–3	@ Cleveland Crusaders (1973–74)	29–21–2
53	L	February 6, 1974	0–3	Quebec Nordiques (1973–74)	29–22–2
54	W	February 8, 1974	4–2	@ Cleveland Crusaders (1973–74)	30–22–2
55	L	February 10, 1974	2–5	Minnesota Fighting Saints (1973–74)	30–23–2
56	L	February 13, 1974	4–9	@ Vancouver Blazers (1973–74)	30–24–2
57	W	February 15, 1974	7–3	@ Edmonton Oilers (1973–74)	31–24–2
58	W	February 17, 1974	3–2 OT	@ Winnipeg Jets (1973–74)	32–24–2
59	L	February 20, 1974	2–4	@ Los Angeles Sharks (1973–74)	32–25–2
60	W	February 23, 1974	3–0	@ Chicago Cougars (1973–74)	33–25–2
61	L	February 24, 1974	0–2	@ Toronto Toros (1973–74)	33–26–2
62	W	February 27, 1974	5–3	Toronto Toros (1973–74)	34–26–2
63	T	February 28, 1974	3–3	@ New York Golden Blades/New Jersey Knights (1973–74)	34–26–3

March

Game	Result	Date	Score	Opponent	Record
64	W	March 2, 1974	7–1	Vancouver Blazers (1973–74)	35–26–3
65	W	March 3, 1974	6–3	@ Houston Aeros (1973–74)	36–26–3
66	W	March 5, 1974	3–2	@ Chicago Cougars (1973–74)	37–26–3
67	L	March 6, 1974	6–8	@ Minnesota Fighting Saints (1973–74)	37–27–3
68	W	March 8, 1974	7–2	@ New York Golden Blades/New Jersey Knights (1973–74)	38–27–3
69	L	March 12, 1974	3–5	@ Chicago Cougars (1973–74)	38–28–3
70	W	March 14, 1974	6–3	@ Vancouver Blazers (1973–74)	39–28–3
71	W	March 15, 1974	6–2	@ Edmonton Oilers (1973–74)	40–28–3
72	L	March 17, 1974	1–10	@ Winnipeg Jets (1973–74)	40–29–3
73	T	March 20, 1974	2–2	Edmonton Oilers (1973–74)	40–29–4
74	L	March 24, 1974	3–4	@ Quebec Nordiques (1973–74)	40–30–4
75	W	March 27, 1974	7–1	Los Angeles Sharks (1973–74)	41–30–4
76	W	March 28, 1974	3–2	Cleveland Crusaders (1973–74)	42–30–4
77	W	March 31, 1974	3–2 OT	Quebec Nordiques (1973–74)	43–30–4

April

Game	Result	Date	Score	Opponent	Record
78	L	April 1, 1974	1–4	Houston Aeros (1973–74)	43–31–4

Legend: Win (2 points) Loss (0 points) Tie (1 point)

== Playoffs ==
1974 Avco Cup playoffs
Division Quarterfinals vs. Chicago Cougars – Cougars win 4–3

Game	Date	Visitor	Score	Home	Series
1	April 6	Chicago Cougars	4–6	New England Whalers	1–0
2	April 7	Chicago Cougars	3 – 4 OT	New England Whalers	2–0
3	April 9	New England Whalers	6–8	Chicago Cougars	2–1
4	April 10	New England Whalers	1 – 2 OT	Chicago Cougars	2–2
5	April 12	Chicago Cougars	4–2	New England Whalers	3–2
6	April 14	New England Whalers	2–0	Chicago Cougars	3–3
7	April 16	Chicago Cougars	3–2	New England Whalers	3–4

Legend: Win Loss

== Draft picks ==
New England's draft picks at the 1973 WHA Amateur Draft.

Round	#	Player	Nationality	College/Junior/Club team (League)
1	2	Glenn Goldup (F)	Canada	Toronto Marlboros (OHA)
1	12	Blake Dunlop (F)	Canada	Ottawa 67's (OHA)
2	26	Mike Clarke (C)	Canada	Calgary Centennials (WCHL)
3	38	Tom Colley (C)	Canada	Sudbury Wolves (OHA)
4	41	Randy Holt (D)	Canada	Sudbury Wolves (OHA)
4	51	Alan Hangsleben (D)	United States	University of North Dakota (WCHA)
5	53	Larry Patey (C)	Canada	Boston University (ECAC)
5	64	Cap Raeder (G)	United States	University of New Hampshire (ECAC)
6	77	Rick Chinnick (F)	Canada	Peterborough Petes (OHA)
7	90	Steve Alley (LW)	United States	University of Wisconsin (WCHA)

== See also ==
- 1973–74 WHA season
