= Gord Gallant =

Canadian ice hockey player

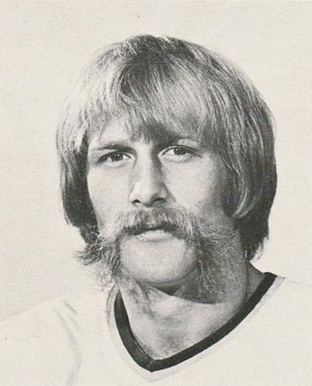
- Born: October 27, 1950 (age 75) Shediac, New Brunswick, Canada
- Height: 5 ft 10 in (178 cm)
- Weight: 165 lb (75 kg; 11 st 11 lb)
- Position: Left wing
- Shot: Left
- Played for: Quebec Nordiques; Minnesota Fighting Saints; Birmingham Bulls
- Playing career: 1966–1989

Gordon Gallant (born October 27, 1950) is a Canadian retired professional ice hockey winger who played 273 games in the World Hockey Association. He was a member of the Quebec Nordiques, Minnesota Fighting Saints, Birmingham Bulls, and Syracuse Blazers.

On April 11, 1975, he was kicked off the Saints for fighting his head coach. He played the following season with the Quebec Nordiques. He then returned to Minnesota in 1976 (now under different management) and played 37 games before being moved over to the Birmingham Bulls, where he played 34 games before he retired.

== Career statistics ==
=== Regular season and playoffs ===
			Regular season					Playoffs
Season	Team	League	GP	G	A	Pts	PIM	GP	G	A	Pts	PIM
1970–71	Des Moines Oak Leafs	IHL	1	0	0	0	0	—	—	—	—	—
1971–72	Columbus Golden Seals	IHL	6	2	2	4	38	—	—	—	—	—
1972–73	Syracuse Blazers	EHL	63	17	34	51	231	10	3	5	8	27
1973–74	Minnesota Fighting Saints	WHA	72	7	15	22	223	11	1	2	3	67
1974–75	Minnesota Fighting Saints	WHA	66	10	13	23	203	1	1	0	1	0
1975–76	Quebec Nordiques	WHA	64	4	15	19	297	2	0	0	0	31
1976–77	Minnesota Fighting Saints	WHA	37	6	3	9	64	—	—	—	—	—
1976–77	Birmingham Bulls	WHA	34	4	13	17	62	—	—	—	—	—
1978–79	Salt Lake Golden Eagles	CHL	63	10	12	22	126	10	2	1	3	11
1979–80	Salt Lake Golden Eagles	CHL	2	0	0	0	25	—	—	—	—	—
1979–80	New Brunswick Hawks	AHL	17	3	4	7	20	5	1	4	5	12
1983–84	Moncton Alpines	AHL	3	0	0	0	10	—	—	—	—	—
WHA totals			273	31	59	90	849	14	2	2	4	98
