= 1973–74 New York Golden Blades/New Jersey Knights season =

World Hockey Association team season

1973–74 New York Golden Blades/Jersey Knights
- Division: 6th Eastern
- 1973–74 record: 32–42–4
- Home record: 22–16–1
- Road record: 10–26–3
- Goals for: 268
- Goals against: 313

Team information
- General manager: Jerry De Lise (Managing Director of Hockey)
- Coach: Camille Henry (6–12–2); Harry Howell (26–30–2)
- Captain: Norm Ferguson
- Alternate captains: Ken Block; Andre Lacroix; Garry Peters
- Arena: Madison Square Garden (Oct.–Nov.); Cherry Hill Arena (Nov.–Apr.)
- Average attendance: 2,585 (30.1%)

Team leaders
- Goals: Andre Lacroix (31)
- Assists: Andre Lacroix (80)
- Points: Andre Lacroix (111)
- Penalty minutes: Kevin Morrison (132)
- Wins: Joe Junkin (21)
- Goals against average: Joe Junkin (3.79)

The 1973–74 New York Golden Blades/Jersey Knights season was the second season of operation of the franchise in the World Hockey Association.

The club was known as the New York Raiders in the previous season. With a change in ownership, the financially challenged team was renamed the New York Golden Blades for the start of this season. The team drew as few as 500 ticket buyers to some home games, and the latest (of 18) owners folded operations. The league took over operations and moved the team to the Philadelphia metropolitan area township of Cherry Hill, New Jersey on November 21, 1973, renaming the franchise the Jersey Knights.

This was the last season of operation in the Northeast megalopolis area, as the franchise relocated to San Diego, California, becoming the San Diego Mariners for the 1974–75 WHA season.

== Regular season ==
=== Final standings ===
Eastern Division
	GP	W	L	T	GF	GA	PIM	Pts
New England Whalers	78	43	31	4	291	260	875	90
Toronto Toros	78	41	33	4	304	272	871	86
Cleveland Crusaders	78	37	32	9	266	264	1007	83
Chicago Cougars	78	38	35	5	271	273	1041	81
Quebec Nordiques	78	38	36	4	306	280	909	80
NY Golden Blades / Jersey Knights	78	32	42	4	268	313	933	68

== Schedule and results ==
=== New York Golden Blades ===
1973–74 regular season
October

Game	Result	Date	Score	Opponent	Record
1	T	October 6, 1973	2–2	@ Cleveland Crusaders (1973–74)	0–0–1
2	T	October 9, 1973	3–3	@ Toronto Toros (1973–74)	0–0–2
3	L	October 11, 1973	3–4	Chicago Cougars (1973–74)	0–1–2
4	L	October 14, 1973	1–2 OT	New England Whalers (1973–74)	0–2–2
5	L	October 18, 1973	1–6	Winnipeg Jets (1973–74)	0–3–2
6	L	October 20, 1973	1–8	@ Quebec Nordiques (1973–74)	0–4–2
7	W	October 21, 1973	4–3	Quebec Nordiques (1973–74)	1–4–2
8	L	October 22, 1973	1–4	@ New England Whalers (1973–74)	1–5–2
9	W	October 24, 1973	5–2	Minnesota Fighting Saints (1973–74)	2–5–2
10	L	October 25, 1973	3–8	New England Whalers (1973–74)	2–6–2
11	L	October 28, 1973	0–2	Los Angeles Sharks (1973–74)	2–7–2

November

Game	Result	Date	Score	Opponent	Record
12	L	November 2, 1973	1–3	@ Winnipeg Jets (1973–74)	2–8–2
13	W	November 3, 1973	4–0	@ Vancouver Blazers (1973–74)	3–8–2
14	W	November 4, 1973	4–3	@ Vancouver Blazers (1973–74)	4–8–2
15	L	November 6, 1973	0–8	@ Edmonton Oilers (1973–74)	4–9–2
16	L	November 7, 1973	1–10	@ Minnesota Fighting Saints (1973–74)	4–10–2
17	W	November 10, 1973	4–3	Quebec Nordiques (1973–74)	5–10–2
18	L	November 12, 1973	2–3 OT	@ New England Whalers (1973–74)	5–11–2
19	L	November 17, 1973	2–3	Houston Aeros (1973–74)	5–12–2
20	W	November 18, 1973	5–3	Chicago Cougars (1973–74)	6–12–2

Legend: Win (2 points) Loss (0 points) Tie (1 point)

=== New Jersey Knights ===
1973–74 regular season
November

Game	Result	Date	Score	Opponent	Record
21	W	November 25, 1973	3–1	Quebec Nordiques (1973–74)	7–12–2
22	L	November 26, 1973	2–4	@ New England Whalers (1973–74)	7–13–2
23	L	November 29, 1973	2–3	Edmonton Oilers (1973–74)	7–14–2

December

Game	Result	Date	Score	Opponent	Record
24	W	December 2, 1973	2–1	Minnesota Fighting Saints (1973–74)	8–14–2
25	L	December 5, 1973	2–5	@ Houston Aeros (1973–74)	8–15–2
26	W	December 6, 1973	3–2	Cleveland Crusaders (1973–74)	9–15–2
27	W	December 8, 1973	3–1	@ Chicago Cougars (1973–74)	10–15–2
28	L	December 9, 1973	1–3	@ Winnipeg Jets (1973–74)	10–16–2
29	W	December 12, 1973	4–2	@ Cleveland Crusaders (1973–74)	11–16–2
30	L	December 14, 1973	1–3	@ New England Whalers (1973–74)	11–17–2
31	L	December 16, 1973	6–7	Edmonton Oilers (1973–74)	11–18–2
32	L	December 18, 1973	1–4	@ Toronto Toros (1973–74)	11–19–2
33	W	December 21, 1973	5–1	Chicago Cougars (1973–74)	12–19–2
34	W	December 23, 1973	6–3	Winnipeg Jets (1973–74)	13–19–2
35	W	December 28, 1973	5–3	Vancouver Blazers (1973–74)	14–19–2
36	L	December 29, 1973	0–3	@ Cleveland Crusaders (1973–74)	14–20–2
37	W	December 30, 1973	6–2	Cleveland Crusaders (1973–74)	15–20–2

January

Game	Result	Date	Score	Opponent	Record
38	W	January 5, 1974	2–1	Houston Aeros (1973–74)	16–20–2
39	W	January 6, 1974	4–2	@ Toronto Toros (1973–74)	17–20–2
40	L	January 7, 1974	4–5	Vancouver Blazers (1973–74)	17–21–2
41	L	January 13, 1974	2–7	@ Toronto Toros (1973–74)	17–22–2
42	L	January 16, 1974	2–4	@ New England Whalers (1973–74)	17–23–2
43	L	January 18, 1974	4–7	@ Edmonton Oilers (1973–74)	17–24–2
44	W	January 19, 1974	5–4 OT	@ Vancouver Blazers (1973–74)	18–24–2
45	L	January 20, 1974	3–9	@ Winnipeg Jets (1973–74)	18–25–2
46	W	January 22, 1974	6–2	@ Edmonton Oilers (1973–74)	19–25–2
47	W	January 23, 1974	4–1	@ Minnesota Fighting Saints (1973–74)	20–25–2
48	L	January 27, 1974	3–6	Los Angeles Sharks (1973–74)	20–26–2
49	W	January 29, 1974	6–1	Toronto Toros (1973–74)	21–26–2
50	W	January 31, 1974	4–1	New England Whalers (1973–74)	22–26–2

February

Game	Result	Date	Score	Opponent	Record
51	L	February 3, 1974	3–5	@ Quebec Nordiques (1973–74)	22–27–2
52	L	February 4, 1974	1–7	Houston Aeros (1973–74)	22–28–2
53	L	February 5, 1974	0–4	@ Houston Aeros (1973–74)	22–29–2
54	W	February 7, 1974	7–4	@ Los Angeles Sharks (1973–74)	23–29–2
55	L	February 9, 1974	2–5	@ Chicago Cougars (1973–74)	23–30–2
56	L	February 10, 1974	4–5	Toronto Toros (1973–74)	23–31–2
57	L	February 14, 1974	2–5	Toronto Toros (1973–74)	23–32–2
58	W	February 15, 1974	6–2	Cleveland Crusaders (1973–74)	24–32–2
59	W	February 17, 1974	10–3	Quebec Nordiques (1973–74)	25–32–2
60	W	February 18, 1974	4–3	Chicago Cougars (1973–74)	26–32–2
61	L	February 20, 1974	2–7	@ Houston Aeros (1973–74)	26–33–2
62	L	February 24, 1974	4–7	@ Quebec Nordiques (1973–74)	26–34–2
63	T	February 28, 1974	3–3	New England Whalers (1973–74)	26–34–3

March

Game	Result	Date	Score	Opponent	Record
64	W	March 2, 1974	8–7	Los Angeles Sharks (1973–74)	27–34–3
65	W	March 4, 1974	7–6 OT	Vancouver Blazers (1973–74)	28–34–3
66	L	March 8, 1974	2–7	New England Whalers (1973–74)	28–35–3
67	L	March 10, 1974	2–5	@ Quebec Nordiques (1973–74)	28–36–3
68	W	March 11, 1974	10–2	Winnipeg Jets (1973–74)	29–36–3
69	W	March 15, 1974	5–3	Minnesota Fighting Saints (1973–74)	30–36–3
70	T	March 16, 1974	4–4	@ Cleveland Crusaders (1973–74)	30–36–4
71	W	March 18, 1974	11–5	Toronto Toros (1973–74)	31–36–4
72	W	March 20, 1974	8–5	@ Los Angeles Sharks (1973–74)	32–36–4
73	L	March 23, 1974	1–4	@ Chicago Cougars (1973–74)	32–37–4
74	L	March 25, 1974	1–4	Edmonton Oilers (1973–74)	32–38–4
75	L	March 27, 1974	4–6	@ Minnesota Fighting Saints (1973–74)	32–39–4
76	L	March 31, 1974	2–4	Cleveland Crusaders (1973–74)	32–40–4

April

Game	Result	Date	Score	Opponent	Record
77	L	April 2, 1974	3–7	@ Chicago Cougars (1973–74)	32–41–4
78	L	April 4, 1974	4–6	@ Los Angeles Sharks (1973–74)	32–42–4

Legend: Win (2 points) Loss (0 points) Tie (1 point)

== Player statistics ==
Regular season
Scoring

Player	Pos	GP	G	A	Pts	PIM	+/-	PPG	SHG	GWG
Andre Lacroix	C	78	31	80	111	54	0	11	0	2
Kevin Morrison	D	78	24	43	67	132	0	5	2	0
Wayne Rivers	RW	73	30	27	57	20	0	5	0	1
Gene Peacosh	LW	68	21	32	53	17	0	5	0	4
Brian Morenz	C	75	20	30	50	44	0	1	2	5
Ken Block	D	74	3	43	46	22	0	1	0	0
Bob Jones	LW	78	17	28	45	20	0	6	0	1
Mike Laughton	C	71	20	18	38	34	0	1	1	4
Brian Bradley	LW	78	15	23	38	12	0	3	1	1
Norm Ferguson	RW	75	15	21	36	12	0	3	0	4
Don Herriman	LW	44	11	21	32	59	0	2	0	1
Brian Perry	C	71	20	11	31	19	0	3	1	4
Harry Howell	D	65	3	23	26	24	0	0	0	2
Bobby Sheehan	C	50	12	8	20	8	0	5	0	1
Bob Brown	D	59	7	13	20	38	0	1	0	1
Craig Reichmuth	LW	72	10	8	18	114	0	0	0	0
Garry Peters	C	34	2	5	7	18	0	0	0	0
Ted Scharf	RW	63	4	2	6	107	0	0	0	1
Dean Boylan	D	61	1	5	6	112	0	0	0	0
Bill Speer	D	66	1	3	4	30	0	0	0	0
Bob Winograd	D	7	1	0	1	0	0	0	0	0
Joe Junkin	G	53	0	1	1	7	0	0	0	0
Gary Kurt	G	20	0	1	1	0	0	0	0	0
Ray LaRose	D	18	0	1	1	20	0	0	0	0
Bob Barber	D	3	0	0	0	2	0	0	0	0
Claude Chartre	C	5	0	0	0	0	0	0	0	0
Lee Inglis	LW	5	0	0	0	0	0	0	0	0
Jim McLeod	G	10	0	0	0	2	0	0	0	0

Goaltending

Player	MIN	GP	W	L	T	GA	GAA	SO
Joe Junkin	3122	53	21	25	4	197	3.79	1
Gary Kurt	1089	20	8	10	0	75	4.13	0
Jim McLeod	516	10	3	7	0	36	4.19	0
Team:	4727	78	32	42	4	308	3.91	1

Note: Pos = Position; GP = Games played; G = Goals; A = Assists; Pts = Points; +/- = plus/minus; PIM = Penalty minutes; PPG = Power-play goals; SHG = Short-handed goals; GWG = Game-winning goals
MIN = Minutes played; W = Wins; L = Losses; T = Ties; GA = Goals-against; GAA = Goals-against average; SO = Shutouts;

== Transactions ==
Jim McLeod traded to Los Angeles Sharks for Russ Gillow & Earl Heiskala, January, 1974. Earl Heiskala refused to report and was suspended.

Bobby Sheehan to Edmonton Oilers for future considerations (Bob Falkenburg), March, 1974.

== Draft picks ==
New York's draft picks at the 1973 WHA Amateur Draft.

Round	#	Player	Nationality	College/Junior/Club team (League)
2	16	Al Sims (D)	Canada	Cornwall Royals (QMJHL)
3	28	John Wensink (LW)	Netherlands	Cornwall Royals (QMJHL)
5	54	Doug Marit (D)	Canada	Regina Pats (WCHL)
6	67	Dennis Ververgaert (RW)	Canada	London Knights (OHA)
7	80	Lowell Ostlund (D)	Canada	Saskatoon Blades (WCHL)
8	93	Paul Granchukoff (F)	United States	Medicine Hat Tigers (WCHL)
9	104	Rick Austin (RW)	Canada	Swift Current Broncos (WCHL)
10	115	Brian Dick (C)	Canada	Winnipeg Jets (WCHL)

== See also ==
- 1973–74 WHA season
