= 1973–74 Cleveland Crusaders season =

World Hockey Association team season

1973–74 Cleveland Crusaders
- Division: 3rd Eastern
- 1973–74 record: 37–32–9
- Home record: 27–8–4
- Road record: 10–24–5
- Goals for: 266
- Goals against: 264

Team information
- General manager: Jack Vivian
- Coach: Bill Needham
- Captain: Paul Shmyr
- Arena: Cleveland Arena
- Average attendance: 6,212 (66.8%)

Team leaders
- Goals: Gary Jarrett (31)
- Assists: Gary Jarrett (39)
- Points: Gary Jarrett (70)
- Penalty minutes: Paul Shmyr (165)
- Wins: Gerry Cheevers (30)
- Goals against average: Gerry Cheevers (3.03)

The 1973–74 Cleveland Crusaders season was the Cleveland Crusaders' second season of operation in the World Hockey Association. The Crusaders placed second in the Eastern Division, qualifying for the playoffs. The Crusaders lost in the first round to the Toronto Toros.

== Regular season ==
=== Final standings ===
Eastern Division
	GP	W	L	T	GF	GA	PIM	Pts
New England Whalers	78	43	31	4	291	260	875	90
Toronto Toros	78	41	33	4	304	272	871	86
Cleveland Crusaders	78	37	32	9	266	264	1007	83
Chicago Cougars	78	38	35	5	271	273	1041	81
Quebec Nordiques	78	38	36	4	306	280	909	80
NY Golden Blades / Jersey Knights	78	32	42	4	268	313	933	68

== Schedule and results ==
1973–74 regular season
October

Game	Result	Date	Score	Opponent	Record
1	T	October 6, 1973	2–2	New York Golden Blades/New Jersey Knights (1973–74)	0–0–1
2	W	October 13, 1973	6–3	Quebec Nordiques (1973–74)	1–0–1
3	W	October 14, 1973	3–2 OT	Chicago Cougars (1973–74)	2–0–1
4	W	October 20, 1973	6–4	Toronto Toros (1973–74)	3–0–1
5	W	October 21, 1973	2–0	@ Houston Aeros (1973–74)	4–0–1
6	L	October 23, 1973	3–4	@ Los Angeles Sharks (1973–74)	4–1–1
7	W	October 26, 1973	3–1	Los Angeles Sharks (1973–74)	5–1–1
8	T	October 27, 1973	2–2	Houston Aeros (1973–74)	5–1–2
9	W	October 31, 1973	6–4	Winnipeg Jets (1973–74)	6–1–2

November

Game	Result	Date	Score	Opponent	Record
10	L	November 3, 1973	4–7	Chicago Cougars (1973–74)	6–2–2
11	L	November 4, 1973	5–7	@ New England Whalers (1973–74)	6–3–2
12	W	November 10, 1973	4–2	Winnipeg Jets (1973–74)	7–3–2
13	L	November 11, 1973	4–6	@ Minnesota Fighting Saints (1973–74)	7–4–2
14	W	November 13, 1973	5–2	@ Chicago Cougars (1973–74)	8–4–2
15	W	November 16, 1973	4–3 OT	@ Los Angeles Sharks (1973–74)	9–4–2
16	L	November 18, 1973	2–8	@ Vancouver Blazers (1973–74)	9–5–2
17	L	November 20, 1973	3–5	@ Edmonton Oilers (1973–74)	9–6–2
18	L	November 21, 1973	2–6	@ Winnipeg Jets (1973–74)	9–7–2
19	L	November 23, 1973	2–3	Quebec Nordiques (1973–74)	9–8–2
20	W	November 24, 1973	2–1	Toronto Toros (1973–74)	10–8–2
21	T	November 29, 1973	4–4	@ Quebec Nordiques (1973–74)	10–8–3

December

Game	Result	Date	Score	Opponent	Record
22	W	December 1, 1973	4–2	Edmonton Oilers (1973–74)	11–8–3
23	W	December 2, 1973	3–0	Edmonton Oilers (1973–74)	12–8–3
24	L	December 6, 1973	2–3	@ New York Golden Blades/New Jersey Knights (1973–74)	12–9–3
25	W	December 8, 1973	2–1 OT	New England Whalers (1973–74)	13–9–3
26	L	December 9, 1973	2–3	@ New England Whalers (1973–74)	13–10–3
27	L	December 12, 1973	2–4	New York Golden Blades/New Jersey Knights (1973–74)	13–11–3
28	L	December 13, 1973	1–3	@ Toronto Toros (1973–74)	13–12–3
29	W	December 15, 1973	4–3	Toronto Toros (1973–74)	14–12–3
30	T	December 16, 1973	2–2	@ Houston Aeros (1973–74)	14–12–4
31	W	December 22, 1973	2–1	Minnesota Fighting Saints (1973–74)	15–12–4
32	W	December 23, 1973	4–2	@ Minnesota Fighting Saints (1973–74)	16–12–4
33	L	December 26, 1973	3–5	Vancouver Blazers (1973–74)	16–13–4
34	L	December 27, 1973	2–4	@ Quebec Nordiques (1973–74)	16–14–4
35	W	December 29, 1973	3–0	New York Golden Blades/New Jersey Knights (1973–74)	17–14–4
36	L	December 30, 1973	2–6	@ New York Golden Blades/New Jersey Knights (1973–74)	17–15–4

January

Game	Result	Date	Score	Opponent	Record
37	L	January 1, 1974	0–3	@ Toronto Toros (1973–74)	17–16–4
38	W	January 5, 1974	1–0	New England Whalers (1973–74)	18–16–4
39	W	January 6, 1974	11–3	Vancouver Blazers (1973–74)	19–16–4
40	T	January 8, 1974	0–0	@ Chicago Cougars (1973–74)	19–16–5
41	W	January 12, 1974	5–4	Los Angeles Sharks (1973–74)	20–16–5
42	W	January 13, 1974	4–2	Minnesota Fighting Saints (1973–74)	21–16–5
43	L	January 18, 1974	3–7	@ Winnipeg Jets (1973–74)	21–17–5
44	L	January 20, 1974	2–5	@ Edmonton Oilers (1973–74)	21–18–5
45	L	January 23, 1974	3–6	@ Vancouver Blazers (1973–74)	21–19–5
46	W	January 24, 1974	5–3	@ Toronto Toros (1973–74)	22–19–5
47	L	January 26, 1974	0–4	@ New England Whalers (1973–74)	22–20–5
48	L	January 27, 1974	3–4	@ Quebec Nordiques (1973–74)	22–21–5
49	W	January 30, 1974	5–1	Houston Aeros (1973–74)	23–21–5

February

Game	Result	Date	Score	Opponent	Record
50	L	February 2, 1974	2–4	Minnesota Fighting Saints (1973–74)	23–22–5
51	W	February 3, 1974	3–1	New England Whalers (1973–74)	24–22–5
52	L	February 5, 1974	1–4	@ Minnesota Fighting Saints (1973–74)	24–23–5
53	L	February 8, 1974	2–4	New England Whalers (1973–74)	24–24–5
54	W	February 9, 1974	4–3	Toronto Toros (1973–74)	25–24–5
55	L	February 15, 1974	2–6	@ New York Golden Blades/New Jersey Knights (1973–74)	25–25–5
56	W	February 16, 1974	5–2	Quebec Nordiques (1973–74)	26–25–5
57	W	February 17, 1974	6–5	Chicago Cougars (1973–74)	27–25–5
58	L	February 19, 1974	5–6 OT	@ Quebec Nordiques (1973–74)	27–26–5
59	W	February 23, 1974	7–3	Vancouver Blazers (1973–74)	28–26–5
60	L	February 24, 1974	1–2	Minnesota Fighting Saints (1973–74)	28–27–5
61	T	February 28, 1974	6–6	@ Minnesota Fighting Saints (1973–74)	28–27–6

March

Game	Result	Date	Score	Opponent	Record
62	L	March 1, 1974	4–7	@ Chicago Cougars (1973–74)	28–28–6
63	T	March 3, 1974	3–3	@ Edmonton Oilers (1973–74)	28–28–7
64	W	March 5, 1974	6–3	@ Los Angeles Sharks (1973–74)	29–28–7
65	W	March 7, 1974	4–2	@ Vancouver Blazers (1973–74)	30–28–7
66	W	March 8, 1974	4–1	@ Winnipeg Jets (1973–74)	31–28–7
67	L	March 10, 1974	3–8	@ Toronto Toros (1973–74)	31–29–7
68	W	March 13, 1974	4–3	Winnipeg Jets (1973–74)	32–29–7
69	T	March 16, 1974	4–4	New York Golden Blades/New Jersey Knights (1973–74)	32–29–8
70	L	March 17, 1974	3–4	@ Houston Aeros (1973–74)	32–30–8
71	W	March 19, 1974	7–4	@ Chicago Cougars (1973–74)	33–30–8
72	L	March 20, 1974	4–5	Houston Aeros (1973–74)	33–31–8
73	W	March 23, 1974	3–1	Edmonton Oilers (1973–74)	34–31–8
74	T	March 24, 1974	3–3	Chicago Cougars (1973–74)	34–31–9
75	W	March 27, 1974	5–4 OT	Quebec Nordiques (1973–74)	35–31–9
76	L	March 28, 1974	2–3	@ New England Whalers (1973–74)	35–32–9
77	W	March 30, 1974	5–4 OT	Los Angeles Sharks (1973–74)	36–32–9
78	W	March 31, 1974	4–2	@ New York Golden Blades/New Jersey Knights (1973–74)	37–32–9

Legend: Win (2 points) Loss (0 points) Tie (1 point)

== Playoffs ==
1974 Avco Cup playoffs
Quarterfinals vs. Toronto Toros – Toros win 4–1

Game	Date	Visitor	Score	Home	Series
1	April 7	Cleveland Crusaders	0–4	Toronto Toros	0–1
2	April 9	Cleveland Crusaders	3–4	Toronto Toros	0–2
3	April 12	Toronto Toros	4–2	Cleveland Crusaders	0–3
4	April 13	Toronto Toros	2–3 OT	Cleveland Crusaders	1–3
5	April 15	Cleveland Crusaders	1–4	Toronto Toros	1–4

Legend: Win Loss

== Player statistics ==
=== Players ===
Regular season
Player	Position	GP	G	A	Pts	PIM	+/-	PPG	SHG	GWG
Gary Jarrett	LW	75	31	39	70	68	0	11	0	4
Jim Wiste	C	76	23	35	58	26	0	4	0	7
Gerry Pinder	LW	73	23	33	56	90	0	3	1	3
Skip Krake	C	69	20	36	56	94	0	5	0	3
Grant Erickson	LW	78	23	27	50	26	0	3	2	5
Ron Buchanan	C	49	18	27	45	2	0	6	0	3
Paul Shmyr	D	78	13	31	44	165	0	3	0	0
Tom Edur	D	76	7	31	38	26	0	1	0	0
Ray Clearwater	D	68	12	23	35	47	0	3	0	1
Paul Andrea	RW	69	15	18	33	14	0	6	3	2
Russ Walker	RW	76	15	14	29	117	0	1	0	2
Ron Ward	C	23	19	7	26	7	0	4	0	4
Larry Hillman	D	44	5	21	26	37	0	1	0	0
Doug Brindley	LW/C	30	13	9	22	13	0	1	0	1
Bill Heindl	LW	67	4	14	18	4	0	1	0	1
Robbie Neale	C	43	8	9	17	30	0	1	0	1
Bill Young	LW	53	8	9	17	70	0	0	0	0
Wayne Muloin	D	76	3	7	10	39	0	1	0	0
Norm Cournoyer	C	13	3	5	8	6	0	1	0	0
Wayne Hillman	D	66	1	7	8	51	0	0	0	0
Rich Pumple	LW	17	2	2	4	16	0	0	0	0
Ted Hodgson	RW	10	0	2	2	6	0	0	0	0
Ralph Hopiavuori	D	13	0	2	2	6	0	0	0	0
Ron Morgan	LW	4	0	1	1	7	0	0	0	0
Bob Whidden	G	22	0	1	1	2	0	0	0	0
Ray Adduono	C	2	0	0	0	0	0	0	0	0
Brad Buetow	D	25	0	0	0	4	0	0	0	0
Gerry Cheevers	G	59	0	0	0	30	0	0	0	0
Jim McMasters	D	9	0	0	0	4	0	0	0	0
Glen Shirton	D	4	0	0	0	0	0	0	0	0

Avco Cup playoffs
Player	Position	GP	G	A	Pts	PIM	PPG	SHG	GWG
Paul Shmyr	D	5	0	4	4	31	0	0	0
Ron Ward	C	5	3	0	3	2	0	0	0
Tom Edur	D	5	1	2	3	0	0	0	0
Gary Jarrett	LW	5	1	1	2	13	0	0	0
Grant Erickson	LW	5	0	2	2	0	0	0	0
Paul Andrea	RW	5	1	0	1	0	0	0	0
Ron Morgan	LW	2	1	0	1	0	0	0	0
Wayne Muloin	D	5	1	0	1	0	0	0	1
Russ Walker	RW	5	1	0	1	11	0	0	0
Doug Brindley	LW/C	5	0	1	1	2	0	0	0
Bill Heindl	LW	5	0	1	1	2	0	0	0
Ralph Hopiavuori	D	4	0	1	1	0	0	0	0
Skip Krake	C	5	0	1	1	39	0	0	0
Jim Wiste	C	5	0	1	1	0	0	0	0
Ron Buchanan	C	5	0	0	0	2	0	0	0
Gerry Cheevers	G	5	0	0	0	6	0	0	0
Ray Clearwater	D	5	0	0	0	2	0	0	0
Wayne Hillman	D	5	0	0	0	16	0	0	0
Robbie Neale	C	5	0	0	0	4	0	0	0
Gerry Pinder	LW	1	0	0	0	0	0	0	0

=== Goaltending ===
Player	MIN	GP	W	L	T	GA	GAA	SO
Gerry Cheevers	3562	59	30	20	6	180	3.03	4
Bob Whidden	1232	22	7	12	3	80	3.90	1
Team:	4794	78	37	32	9	260	3.25	5

Avco Cup playoffs
Player	MIN	GP	W	L	GA	GAA	SO
Gerry Cheevers	303	5	1	4	18	3.56	0
Team:	303	5	1	4	18	3.56	0

Note: Pos = Position; GP = Games played; G = Goals; A = Assists; Pts = Points; +/- = plus/minus; PIM = Penalty minutes; PPG = Power-play goals; SHG = Short-handed goals; GWG = Game-winning goals
MIN = Minutes played; W = Wins; L = Losses; T = Ties; GA = Goals-against; GAA = Goals-against average; SO = Shutouts;

== Draft picks ==
Cleveland's draft picks at the 1973 WHA Amateur Draft.

Round	#	Player	Nationality	College/Junior/Club team (League)
1	10	Lanny McDonald (F)	Canada	Medicine Hat Tigers (WCHL)
2	24	George Pesut (D)	Canada	Saskatoon Blades (WCHL)
3	36	Robbie Neale (F)	Canada	Brandon Wheat Kings (WCHL)
4	49	Russ Walker (RW)	Canada	Saskatoon Blades (WCHL)
5	62	Rich Latulippe (F)	Canada	Quebec Remparts (QMJHL)
6	75	Bob Smulders (F)	Canada	Peterborough Petes (OHA)
7	88	Ron Serafini (D)	United States	St. Catharines Black Hawks (OHA)
8	100	Michel Latrielle (D)	Canada	Montreal Red White and Blue (QMJHL)
9	111	Bruce Greig (LW)	Canada	Vancouver Nats (WCHL)
10	120	Henry Durkin (G)	Canada	Swift Current Broncos (WCHL)

== See also ==
- 1973–74 WHA season
