= 1973–74 WHA season =

Professional ice hockey league season

- League: World Hockey Association
- Sport: Ice hockey
- Duration: October 6, 1973 – May 19, 1974
- Games: 78
- Teams: 12

Draft
- Top draft pick: Bob Neely
- Picked by: Chicago Cougars

Regular season
- Season champions: Houston Aeros
- Season MVP: Gordie Howe (Houston)
- Top scorer: Mike Walton (Minnesota)

Avco Cup Final
- Champions: Houston Aeros
- Runners-up: Chicago Cougars

WHA seasons
- 1972–73 1974–75

The 1973–74 WHA season was the second season of the World Hockey Association, and lasted from October 1973 until the Avco Cup final game on May 19, 1974, when the Houston Aeros, with Gordie Howe, defeated the Chicago Cougars to sweep the series in four games. Twelve teams each played 78 games. The Philadelphia Blazers relocated to Vancouver, becoming the Vancouver Blazers. They were moved to the Western Division and Chicago moved to the East. The New York Raiders were renamed the New York Golden Blades and then moved to Cherry Hill, New Jersey to become the Jersey Knights after just 24 games. The Ottawa Nationals moved to Toronto and became the Toronto Toros. The Alberta Oilers changed their name to the Edmonton Oilers.

== Regular season ==
=== Final standings ===
GP = Games Played, W = Wins, L = Losses, T = Ties, Pts = Points, GF = Goals for, GA = Goals against, PIM = Penalties in minutes
Teams that qualifies for the playoffs are highlighted in bold

Eastern Division
	GP	W	L	T	GF	GA	PIM	Pts
**New England Whalers**	78	43	31	4	291	260	875	90
**Toronto Toros**	78	41	33	4	304	272	871	86
**Cleveland Crusaders**	78	37	32	9	266	264	1007	83
**Chicago Cougars**	78	38	35	5	271	273	1041	81
Quebec Nordiques	78	38	36	4	306	280	909	80
NY Golden Blades / Jersey Knights	78	32	42	4	268	313	933	68

Western Division
	GP	W	L	T	GF	GA	PIM	Pts
**Houston Aeros**	78	48	25	5	318	219	1038	101
**Minnesota Fighting Saints**	78	44	32	2	332	275	1243	90
**Edmonton Oilers**	78	38	37	3	268	269	1273	79
**Winnipeg Jets**	78	34	39	5	264	296	673	73
Vancouver Blazers	78	27	50	1	278	345	1047	55
Los Angeles Sharks	78	25	53	0	239	339	1086	50

=== Summary ===
In June 1973, the Houston Aeros lured 45-year-old Gordie Howe out of retirement by promising him that he could play with his sons Mark and Marty who were also on the team. Howe responded by having a 100-point season, leading the team in scoring and helping them finish with the best record in the league. The Aeros also received excellent goaltending from Don McLeod and Wayne Rutledge.

The defending Western Division champion Winnipeg Jets slipped to 4th place with a sub-.500 record. The other playoff qualifiers in the West were Minnesota and Edmonton. In the East, defending Avco World Trophy champions New England won their second straight division title followed by Toronto, Cleveland, and Chicago.

== Player stats ==
=== Scoring leaders ===
_{Bolded numbers indicate season leaders}

GP = Games played; G = Goals; A = Assists; Pts = Points; PIM = Penalty minutes

Player	Team	GP	G	A	Pts	PIM
Mike Walton	Minnesota Fighting Saints	78	**57**	60	**117**	88
Andre Lacroix	NY Golden Blades / Jersey Knights	78	31	**80**	111	54
Gordie Howe	Houston Aeros	76	31	69	100	46
Wayne Connelly	Minnesota Fighting Saints	78	42	53	95	16
Bobby Hull	Winnipeg Jets	75	53	42	95	37
Wayne Carleton	Toronto Toros	78	37	55	92	31
Bryan Campbell	Vancouver Blazers	76	27	62	89	50
Danny Lawson	Vancouver Blazers	78	50	38	88	14
Serge Bernier	Quebec Nordiques	74	37	49	86	107
Larry Lund	Houston Aeros	75	33	53	86	109

=== Leading goaltenders ===
_{Bolded numbers indicate season leaders}

GP = Games played; Min = Minutes played; W = Wins; L = Losses; T = Ties, GA = Goals against; GA = Goals against; SO = Shutouts; SV% = Save percentage; GAA = Goals against average

Player	Team	GP	Min	W	L	T	GA	SO	SV%	GAA
Don McLeod	Houston Aeros	49	2971	**33**	13	3	127	3	**91.1**	**2.56**
Gerry Cheevers	Cleveland Crusaders	**59**	**3562**	30	20	**6**	180	**4**	90.6	3.03
Al Smith	New England Whalers	55	3194	30	21	2	164	2	89.5	3.08
Cam Newton	Chicago Cougars	45	2732	25	18	2	143	1	89.4	3.14
Jack Norris	Edmonton Oilers	53	2954	23	24	1	158	2	89.8	3.21

== All-Star Game ==
At St. Paul Civic Center in St. Paul, MN, the East defeated the West 8–4.

== Avco World Trophy playoffs ==
The West Division playoffs went according to form, with the top two seeds, Houston and Minnesota, easily disposing of Edmonton and Winnipeg respectively. In the east, Toronto won as expected over Cleveland, but Chicago shocked the WHA by upsetting the defending champion New England Whalers in seven games, winning three of the four games in New England. In the division finals, favored Houston defeated Minnesota in six games, while Chicago pulled its second upset by beating Toronto in seven games, outscoring the Toros 14–4 in winning games six and seven. They ran out of magic in the finals however, as Houston swept them in four straight, outscoring them 22–9.

Quarterfinals
E1	New England Whalers	3
E4	Chicago Cougars	4
Eastern Division
E2	Toronto Toros	4
E3	Cleveland Crusaders	1
W1	Houston Aeros	4
W4	Winnipeg Jets	0
Western Division
W2	Minnesota Fighting Saints	4
W3	Edmonton Oilers	1

Semifinals
E4	Chicago Cougars	4
E2	Toronto Toros	3
W1	Houston Aeros	4
W2	Minnesota Fighting Saints	2

Finals
E4	Chicago Cougars	0
W1	Houston Aeros	4

== WHA awards ==
=== Trophies ===
Avco World Trophy:	Houston Aeros
Gary L. Davidson Award:	Gordie Howe, Houston Aeros
Bill Hunter Trophy:	Mike Walton, Minnesota Fighting Saints
Lou Kaplan Trophy:	Mark Howe, Houston Aeros
Ben Hatskin Trophy:	Don McLeod, Houston Aeros
Dennis A. Murphy Trophy:	Pat Stapleton, Chicago Cougars
Paul Deneau Trophy:	Ralph Backstrom, Chicago Cougars
Howard Baldwin Trophy:	Billy Harris, Toronto Toros

=== All-Star Team ===
Position	First Team	Second Team
Centre	Andre Lacroix, New York/Jersey	Wayne Carleton, Toronto
Right Wing	Gordie Howe, Houston	Mike Walton, Minnesota
Left Wing	Bobby Hull, Winnipeg	Mark Howe, Houston
Defence	Pat Stapleton, Chicago	J. C. Tremblay, Quebec
Defence	Paul Shmyr, Cleveland	Al Hamilton, Edmonton
Goaltender	Don McLeod, Houston	Gerry Cheevers, Cleveland

== See also ==
- 1973 WHA Amateur Draft
- List of NHL seasons
- List of pre-NHL seasons
- 1973 in sports
- 1974 in sports
