= 1973–74 Quebec Nordiques season =

World Hockey Association team season

1973–74 Quebec Nordiques
- Division: 5th East
- 1973–74 record: 38–36–4
- Home record: 25–10–4
- Road record: 13–26–0
- Goals for: 306
- Goals against: 280

Team information
- General manager: Jacques Plante
- Coach: Jacques Plante
- Captain: J.C. Tremblay
- Alternate captains: Jean Payette; Rene LeClerc; Rejean Houle
- Arena: Quebec Coliseum
- Average attendance: 7,983 (79.8%)

Team leaders
- Goals: Serge Bernier (37)
- Assists: Serge Bernier (49)
- Points: Serge Bernier (86)
- Penalty minutes: Pierre Roy (137)
- Wins: Richard Brodeur (15)
- Goals against average: Michel DeGuise (3.29)

The 1973–74 Quebec Nordiques season was the Nordiques second season, as they were coming off a 33–40–5 record, earning 71 points, failing to qualify for the playoffs in their first season.

The Nordiques would replace head coach Maurice Filion in the off-season, and name recently retired NHL superstar goaltender Jacques Plante as head coach of the team. The club also acquired Serge Bernier from the Los Angeles Kings and Rejean Houle from the Montreal Canadiens of the NHL to try to spark the offense.

The Nordiques would improve and finish over .500 for the first time in team history with a 38–36–4 record, however, they would once again come up short for a playoff berth, finishing only 1 point behind the Chicago Cougars for the final spot.

Offensively, Quebec was led by Serge Bernier, as he would post a team best 86 points, scoring a Nordiques record 37 goals along the way. Bob Guindon would have a very solid season, scoring 31 goals and 70 points, while Alain Coron would also score 31 goals while appearing in only 59 games due to injuries. Defenseman J. C. Tremblay would anchor the defence, scoring 9 goals and earning 53 points, while Pierre Roy supplied the team toughness, recording 137 penalty minutes in only 44 games.

In goal, Richard Brodeur would lead the Nordiques in wins with 15 and save percentage at .901, while Michel DeGuise would post a team best 3.29 GAA, playing in a team high 32 games. Serge Aubry also had some playing time, winning 11 games.

== Season standings ==
Eastern Division
	GP	W	L	T	GF	GA	PIM	Pts
New England Whalers	78	43	31	4	291	260	875	90
Toronto Toros	78	41	33	4	304	272	871	86
Cleveland Crusaders	78	37	32	9	266	264	1007	83
Chicago Cougars	78	38	35	5	271	273	1041	81
Quebec Nordiques	78	38	36	4	306	280	909	80
NY Golden Blades / Jersey Knights	78	32	42	4	268	313	933	68

== Schedule and results ==
1973–74 regular season
October

Game	Date	Visitor	Score	Home	Record	Points
1	October 7	New England Whalers	2–4	Quebec Nordiques	1–0–0	2
2	October 9	Quebec Nordiques	2–3	New England Whalers	1–1–0	2
3	October 11	Quebec Nordiques	4–1	Toronto Toros	2–1–0	4
4	October 13	Quebec Nordiques	3–6	Cleveland Crusaders	2–2–0	4
5	October 18	Toronto Toros	2–5	Quebec Nordiques	3–2–0	6
6	October 20	New York Golden Blades	1–8	Quebec Nordiques	4–2–0	8
7	October 21	Quebec Nordiques	3–4	New York Golden Blades	4–3–0	8
8	October 25	Chicago Cougars	4–2	Quebec Nordiques	4–4–0	8
9	October 26	Quebec Nordiques	5–4	Minnesota Fighting Saints	5–4–0	10
10	October 28	Quebec Nordiques	3–2	Houston Aeros	6–4–0	12
11	October 30	Quebec Nordiques	6–4	Los Angeles Sharks	7–4–0	14
12	October 31	Quebec Nordiques	5–1	Vancouver Blazers	8–4–0	16

November

Game	Date	Visitor	Score	Home	Record	Points
13	November 2	Quebec Nordiques	4–5	Edmonton Oilers	8–5–0	16
14	November 4	Quebec Nordiques	2–8	Winnipeg Jets	8–6–0	16
15	November 6	Winnipeg Jets	2–2	Quebec Nordiques	8–6–1	17
16	November 8	Edmonton Oilers	4–3	Quebec Nordiques	8–7–1	17
17	November 10	Quebec Nordiques	3–4	New York Golden Blades	8–8–1	17
18	November 11	New England Whalers	2–3	Quebec Nordiques	9–8–1	19
19	November 15	New England Whalers	5–3	Quebec Nordiques	9–9–1	19
20	November 17	Quebec Nordiques	10–4	New England Whalers	10–9–1	21
21	November 18	Houston Aeros	3–8	Quebec Nordiques	11–9–1	23
22	November 22	Toronto Toros	4–2	Quebec Nordiques	11–10–1	23
23	November 23	Quebec Nordiques	3–2	Cleveland Crusaders	12–10–1	25
24	November 25	Quebec Nordiques	1–3	Jersey Knights	12–11–1	25
25	November 27	Quebec Nordiques	1–3	Toronto Toros	12–12–1	25
26	November 29	Cleveland Crusaders	4–4	Quebec Nordiques	12–12–2	26

December

Game	Date	Visitor	Score	Home	Record	Points
27	December 1	Houston Aeros	3–3	Quebec Nordiques	12–12–3	27
28	December 2	Quebec Nordiques	3–5	Winnipeg Jets	12–13–3	27
29	December 8	Quebec Nordiques	1–4	Minnesota Fighting Saints	12–14–3	27
30	December 9	Chicago Cougars	1–6	Quebec Nordiques	13–14–3	29
31	December 12	Quebec Nordiques	1–2	Vancouver Blazers	13–15–3	29
32	December 14	Quebec Nordiques	4–3	Edmonton Oilers	14–15–3	31
33	December 16	Quebec Nordiques	4–3	Toronto Toros	15–15–3	33
34	December 18	Edmonton Oilers	2–4	Quebec Nordiques	16–15–3	35
35	December 22	Toronto Toros	6–4	Quebec Nordiques	16–16–3	35
36	December 27	Cleveland Crusaders	2–4	Quebec Nordiques	17–16–3	37
37	December 28	Quebec Nordiques	4–6	Chicago Cougars	17–17–3	37
38	December 29	Winnipeg Jets	4–3	Quebec Nordiques	17–18–3	37

January

Game	Date	Visitor	Score	Home	Record	Points
39	January 5	Vancouver Blazers	2–5	Quebec Nordiques	18–18–3	39
40	January 6	Chicago Cougars	0–4	Quebec Nordiques	19–18–3	41
41	January 10	Los Angeles Sharks	1–7	Quebec Nordiques	20–18–3	43
42	January 12	Quebec Nordiques	1–5	Houston Aeros	20–19–3	43
43	January 15	Quebec Nordiques	4–6	Los Angeles Sharks	20–20–3	43
44	January 19	Quebec Nordiques	2–5	Chicago Cougars	20–21–3	43
45	January 20	Minnesota Fighting Saints	4–5	Quebec Nordiques	21–21–3	45
46	January 24	Quebec Nordiques	1–5	Houston Aeros	21–22–3	45
47	January 25	Quebec Nordiques	0–2	Los Angeles Sharks	21–23–3	45
48	January 27	Cleveland Crusaders	3–4	Quebec Nordiques	22–23–3	47
49	January 29	Los Angeles Sharks	0–5	Quebec Nordiques	23–23–3	49
50	January 31	Houston Aeros	4–6	Quebec Nordiques	24–23–3	51

February

Game	Date	Visitor	Score	Home	Record	Points
51	February 1	Toronto Toros	1–2	Quebec Nordiques	25–23–3	53
52	February 3	Jersey Knights	3–5	Quebec Nordiques	26–23–3	55
53	February 6	Quebec Nordiques	3–0	New England Whalers	27–23–3	57
54	February 8	Quebec Nordiques	3–7	Vancouver Blazers	27–24–3	57
55	February 10	Quebec Nordiques	4–3	Edmonton Oilers	28–24–3	59
56	February 12	Quebec Nordiques	4–6	Toronto Toros	28–25–3	59
57	February 14	Quebec Nordiques	5–3	Chicago Cougars	29–25–3	61
58	February 16	Quebec Nordiques	2–5	Cleveland Crusaders	29–26–3	61
59	February 17	Quebec Nordiques	3–10	Jersey Knights	29–27–3	61
60	February 19	Cleveland Crusaders	5–6	Quebec Nordiques	30–27–3	63
61	February 22	Minnesota Fighting Saints	6–4	Quebec Nordiques	30–28–3	63
62	February 24	Jersey Knights	4–7	Quebec Nordiques	31–28–3	65
63	February 26	Winnipeg Jets	1–7	Quebec Nordiques	32–28–3	67
64	February 28	Vancouver Blazers	4–9	Quebec Nordiques	33–28–3	69

March

Game	Date	Visitor	Score	Home	Record	Points
65	March 3	Quebec Nordiques	6–8	Winnipeg Jets	33–29–3	69
66	March 7	Chicago Cougars	3–2	Quebec Nordiques	33–30–3	69
67	March 9	Quebec Nordiques	5–9	Minnesota Fighting Saints	33–31–3	69
68	March 10	Jersey Knights	2–5	Quebec Nordiques	34–31–3	71
69	March 14	Quebec Nordiques	3–2	Toronto Toros	35–31–3	73
70	March 16	Quebec Nordiques	3–4	Chicago Cougars	35–32–3	73
71	March 17	Minnesota Fighting Saints	5–3	Quebec Nordiques	35–33–3	73
72	March 21	Edmonton Oilers	5–5	Quebec Nordiques	35–33–4	74
73	March 23	Vancouver Blazers	2–6	Quebec Nordiques	36–33–4	76
74	March 24	New England Whalers	3–4	Quebec Nordiques	37–33–4	78
75	March 27	Quebec Nordiques	4–5	Cleveland Crusaders	37–34–4	78
76	March 28	Los Angeles Sharks	3–9	Quebec Nordiques	38–34–4	80
77	March 30	Toronto Toros	3–1	Quebec Nordiques	38–35–4	80
78	March 31	Quebec Nordiques	2–3	New England Whalers	38–36–4	80

Legend: Win (2 points) Loss (0 points) Tie (1 point)

== Season stats ==
=== Scoring leaders ===
Player	GP	G	A	Pts	PIM
Serge Bernier	74	37	49	86	107
Bob Guindon	77	31	39	70	30
Andre Gaudette	78	24	44	68	16
Rejean Houle	69	27	35	62	17
Michel Parizeau	78	26	34	60	39

=== Goaltending ===
Player	GP	TOI	W	L	T	GA	SO	GAA	Save %
Michel DeGuise	32	1750	12	13	1	96	1	3.29	.896
Richard Brodeur	30	1607	15	12	1	89	1	3.32	.901
Serge Aubry	26	1395	11	11	2	90	1	3.87	.880

== Draft picks ==
Quebec's draft picks at the 1973 WHA Amateur Draft.

Round	#	Player	Nationality	College/Junior/Club team (League)
1	3	Andre Savard	Canada	Quebec Remparts (QMJHL)
2	14	Blaine Stoughton	Canada	Flin Flon Bombers (WCHL)
2	17	Morris Titanic	Canada	Sudbury Wolves (OHA)
3	29	Eric Vail	Canada	Sudbury Wolves (OHA)
4	42	Jean Landry	Canada	Quebec Remparts (QMJHL)
5	55	Denis Patry	Canada	Drummondville Rangers (QMJHL)
6	68	Dale Cook	Canada	Victoria Cougars (WCHL)
7	81	Andre Deschamps	Canada	Quebec Remparts (QMJHL)
8	94	Bob Stumpf	Canada	New Westminster Bruins (WCHL)
9	105	Guy Ross	Canada	Sherbrooke Castors (QMJHL)
10	116	Michel Belisle	Canada	Montreal Bleu Blanc Rouge (QMJHL)
