= 1973–74 Toronto Toros season =

World Hockey Association team season

1973–74 Toronto Toros
- League: 4th WHA
- Division: 2nd Eastern
- 1973–74 record: 41–33–4
- Home record: 25–11–3
- Road record: 16–22–1
- Goals for: 304
- Goals against: 272

Team information
- General manager: A.J. (Buck) Houle
- Coach: Billy Harris
- Captain: Wayne Carleton
- Alternate captains: Bob Leduc; Brian Gibbons; Gavin Kirk
- Arena: Varsity Arena (30 games); Ottawa Civic Center (9 games)
- Average attendance: 4,291 (73.5%)

Team leaders
- Goals: Wayne Carleton (37)
- Assists: Wayne Carleton (55)
- Points: Wayne Carleton (92)
- Penalty minutes: Rick Cunningham (88)
- Wins: Gilles Gratton (26)
- Goals against average: Les Binkley (3.27)

The 1973–74 Toronto Toros season was the team's first season in Toronto, as they spent their inaugural season as the Ottawa Nationals in 1972–73.

== Offseason ==
The Nationals were moved to Toronto and sold to John F. Bassett, son of former Toronto Maple Leafs part owner John W. H. Bassett. The new owner renamed team the Toros, as its short for Toronto, and it is also a Spanish bull. To attract attention, Bassett signed 18-year-old Toronto Marlboros star Wayne Dillon, and former Maple Leafs defenseman Carl Brewer to anchor the blueline. The Toros also thought they had a deal to sign Maple Leafs star player Darryl Sittler to a five-year, $1 million contract, however, Sittler decided to return to the Leafs.

The Toros originally planned to move the team into a renovated CNE Coliseum, while Bill Ballard, the son of Maple Leafs owner Harold Ballard and was running Maple Leaf Gardens due to his father being in prison, was opposed of the renovation and wanted the team to play in the Gardens. The Toros decided to spend the season at Varsity Arena, which seated 4,860 fans.

As the Ottawa Nationals the previous season, the team finished in fourth place in the Eastern Division with a 35-39-4 record, losing to the New England Whalers in the first round of the playoffs.

== Regular season ==
The first game for the Toros was played on October 7, 1973, at Varsity Arena, with Toronto tying the Chicago Cougars 4-4. The Toros got off to a sluggish start, going 0-2-2 in their first four games before defeating the Los Angeles Sharks 3-0 on the road. The team continued to slump, and through their first twelve games, sat with a record of 2-7-3. Toronto broke out of their slump though, and posted a record of 17-11-0 in their next 28 games to go over the .500 for the first time. The Toros kept up their great play, and ended the season in second place in the Eastern Division, with a 41-33-4 record, earning 86 points, which was a twelve-point improvement over the previous season. Head coach Billy Harris won the Howard Baldwin Trophy, presented to the Coach of the Year.

Offensively, Toronto was led by Wayne Carleton, who finished with a team high 37 goals and 92 points and finished sixth in league scoring. Gavin Kirk had another solid season, earning 68 points in 78 games, while rookie Wayne Dillon earned 65 points in 71 games. The defense was led by Brian Gibbons, who had 35 points, while Carl Brewer chipped in with 25 points. Rick Cunningham led the Toros with 88 penalty minutes.

In goal, Gilles Gratton had the majority of playing time, winning 26 games while posting a GAA of 3.53, along with two shutouts. Les Binkley backed him up, winning 14 games with a team best 3.27 GAA, and a shutout.

=== Season standings ===
Eastern Division
	GP	W	L	T	GF	GA	PIM	Pts
New England Whalers	78	43	31	4	291	260	875	90
Toronto Toros	78	41	33	4	304	272	871	86
Cleveland Crusaders	78	37	32	9	266	264	1007	83
Chicago Cougars	78	38	35	5	271	273	1041	81
Quebec Nordiques	78	38	36	4	306	280	909	80
NY Golden Blades / Jersey Knights	78	32	42	4	268	313	933	68

== Schedule and results ==
1973–74 regular season
October

Game	Date	Visitor	Score	Home	Record	Pts
1	October 7	Chicago Cougars	4–4	Toronto Toros	0–0–1	1
2	October 9	New York Golden Blades	3–3	Toronto Toros	0–0–2	2
3	October 11	Quebec Nordiques	4–1	Toronto Toros	0–1–2	2
4	October 14	Minnesota Fighting Saints	5–2	Toronto Toros	0–2–2	2
5	October 16	Toronto Toros	3–0	Los Angeles Sharks	1–2–2	4
6	October 18	Toronto Toros	1–4	Quebec Nordiques	1–3–2	4
7	October 20	Toronto Toros	4–6	Cleveland Crusaders	1–4–2	4
8	October 21	New England Whalers	4–3	Toronto Toros	1–5–2	4
9	October 23	Toronto Toros	2–4	Edmonton Oilers	1–6–2	4
10	October 24	Toronto Toros	7–4	Vancouver Blazers	2–6–2	6
11	October 26	Toronto Toros	3–3	Winnipeg Jets	2–6–3	7
12	October 28	Chicago Cougars	3–2	Toronto Toros	2–7–3	7

November

Game	Date	Visitor	Score	Home	Record	Pts
13	November 3	Toronto Toros	5–4	New England Whalers	3–7–3	9
14	November 4	Los Angeles Sharks	3–6	Toronto Toros	4–7–3	11
15	November 7	Toronto Toros	5–4	Houston Aeros	5–7–3	13
16	November 9	Toronto Toros	2–4	Los Angeles Sharks	5–8–3	13
17	November 10	Toronto Toros	2–3	Chicago Cougars	5–9–3	13
18	November 11	Edmonton Oilers	4–2	Toronto Toros	5–10–3	13
19	November 17	Toronto Toros	2–5	Chicago Cougars	5–11–3	13
20	November 18	Winnipeg Jets	2–6	Toronto Toros	6–11–3	15
21	November 22	Toronto Toros	4–2	Quebec Nordiques	7–11–3	17
22	November 24	Toronto Toros	1–2	Cleveland Crusaders	7–12–3	17
23	November 25	Vancouver Blazers	2–3	Toronto Toros	8–12–3	19
24	November 27	Quebec Nordiques	1–3	Toronto Toros	9–12–3	21
25	November 30	Toronto Toros	2–1	Minnesota Fighting Saints	10–12–3	23

December

Game	Date	Visitor	Score	Home	Record	Pts
26	December 2	Houston Aeros	2–5	Toronto Toros	11–12–3	25
27	December 5	Toronto Toros	3–1	Vancouver Blazers	12–12–3	27
28	December 6	Toronto Toros	3–4	Edmonton Oilers	12–13–3	27
29	December 7	Toronto Toros	4–7	Winnipeg Jets	12–14–3	27
30	December 9	Minnesota Fighting Saints	1–10	Toronto Toros	13–14–3	29
31	December 12	Toronto Toros	6–8	New England Whalers	13–15–3	29
32	December 13	Cleveland Crusaders	1–3	Toronto Toros	14–15–3	31
33	December 15	Toronto Toros	3–4	Cleveland Crusaders	14–16–3	31
34	December 16	Quebec Nordiques	4–3 OT	Toronto Toros	14–17–3	31
35	December 18	Jersey Knights	1–4	Toronto Toros	15–17–3	33
36	December 21	Houston Aeros	1–3	Toronto Toros	16–17–3	35
37	December 22	Toronto Toros	6–4	Quebec Nordiques	17–17–3	37
38	December 23	Chicago Cougars	6–5	Toronto Toros	17–18–3	37
39	December 29	Toronto Toros	9–3	Minnesota Fighting Saints	18–18–3	39
40	December 30	Winnipeg Jets	2–5	Toronto Toros	19–18–3	41

January

Game	Date	Visitor	Score	Home	Record	Pts
41	January 1	Cleveland Crusaders	0–3	Toronto Toros	20–18–3	43
42	January 6	Jersey Knights	4–2	Toronto Toros	20–19–3	43
43	January 8	Toronto Toros	3–2	New England Whalers	21–19–3	45
44	January 10	New England Whalers	6–6	Toronto Toros	21–19–4	46
45	January 12	Toronto Toros	6–8	Minnesota Fighting Saints	21–20–4	46
46	January 13	Jersey Knights	2–7	Toronto Toros	22–20–4	48
47	January 16	Toronto Toros	1–4	Houston Aeros	22–21–4	48
48	January 18	Toronto Toros	1–4	Los Angeles Sharks	22–22–4	48
49	January 20	New England Whalers	4–8	Toronto Toros	23–22–4	50
50	January 24	Cleveland Crusaders	5–3	Toronto Toros	23–23–4	50
51	January 27	Vancouver Blazers	7–9	Toronto Toros	24–23–4	52
52	January 29	Toronto Toros	1–6	Jersey Knights	24–24–4	52
53	January 31	Los Angeles Sharks	4–5 OT	Toronto Toros	25–24–4	54

February

Game	Date	Visitor	Score	Home	Record	Pts
54	February 1	Toronto Toros	1–2	Quebec Nordiques	25–25–4	54
55	February 3	Minnesota Fighting Saints	4–5	Toronto Toros	26–25–4	56
56	February 9	Toronto Toros	3–4	Cleveland Crusaders	26–26–4	56
57	February 10	Toronto Toros	5–4	Jersey Knights	27–26–4	58
58	February 12	Quebec Nordiques	4–6	Toronto Toros	28–26–4	60
59	February 14	Toronto Toros	5–2	Jersey Knights	29–26–4	62
60	February 16	Toronto Toros	5–4	Chicago Cougars	30–26–4	64
61	February 17	Toronto Toros	2–3 OT	Edmonton Oilers	30–27–4	64
62	February 19	Toronto Toros	5–4 OT	Vancouver Blazers	31–27–4	66
63	February 22	Toronto Toros	3–4	Winnipeg Jets	31–28-4	66
64	February 24	New England Whalers	0–2	Toronto Toros	32–28–4	68
65	February 27	Toronto Toros	3–5	New England Whalers	32–29–4	68
66	February 28	Winnipeg Jets	0–3	Toronto Toros	33–29–4	70

March

Game	Date	Visitor	Score	Home	Record	Pts
67	March 3	Toronto Toros	5–4	Chicago Cougars	34–29–4	72
68	March 9	Toronto Toros	2–4	Houston Aeros	34–30–4	72
69	March 10	Cleveland Crusaders	3–8	Toronto Toros	35–30–4	74
70	March 14	Quebec Nordiques	3–2	Toronto Toros	35–31–4	74
71	March 17	Chicago Cougars	4–2	Toronto Toros	35–32–4	74
72	March 18	Toronto Toros	5–11	Jersey Knights	35–33–4	74
73	March 21	Houston Aeros	3–6	Toronto Toros	36–33–4	76
74	March 24	Vancouver Blazers	1–3	Toronto Toros	37–33–4	78
75	March 28	Edmonton Oilers	5–6 OT	Toronto Toros	38–33–4	80
76	March 30	Toronto Toros	3–1	Quebec Nordiques	39–33–4	82
77	March 31	Los Angeles Sharks	4–5	Toronto Toros	40–33–4	84

April

Game	Date	Visitor	Score	Home	Record	Pts
78	April 2	Edmonton Oilers	2–3	Toronto Toros	41–33–4	86

Legend: Win (2 points) Loss (0 points) Tie (1 point)

== Playoffs ==
The Toros opened the playoffs in a best of seven series against the Cleveland Crusaders, who finished in third place in the Eastern Division, three points behind Toronto. The series opened at Varsity Arena, with the Toros shutting out the Crusaders 4-0 in the series opener, followed by a close 4-3 victory in the second game to take a 2-0 series lead. The series shifted to Cleveland for the next two games; however, the Toros took the third game 4-2 to put the Crusaders on the brink of elimination. Cleveland managed to avoid being eliminated in the fourth game, winning 3-2 in overtime; however, the series returned to Toronto for the fifth game, with the Toros winning 4-1 to take the series in five games.

Next up for Toronto was the Chicago Cougars, who finished in fourth place in the Eastern Division, five points behind the Toros. The Cougars defeated the first place New England Whalers in seven games to advance to the Divisional Finals. The series opened in Toronto, and the Toros took an early series lead with a 6-4 victory in the first game. The Cougars won the second game 4-3 to even the series up. The series moved to Chicago for the next two games, and the Cougars took a 2-1 series lead with a 3-2 victory in the third game; however, the Toros won a wild fourth game by a 7-6 score to even up the series again. In the fifth game in Toronto, the Toros took care of the Cougars 5-3 to go up 3-2 in the series. Back in Chicago for the sixth game, the Cougars fought off elimination, easily defeating Toronto by a 9-2 score, setting up a seventh and final game at Varsity Arena. Chicago upset the favoured Toros, winning the game 5-2 to advance to the Avco Cup finals, ending Toronto's season.

1974 Avco Cup playoffs
Quarterfinals vs. Cleveland Crusaders – Toros win 4–1

Game	Date	Visitor	Score	Home	Series
1	April 7	Cleveland Crusaders	0–4	Toronto Toros	1-0
2	April 9	Cleveland Crusaders	3–4	Toronto Toros	2-0
3	April 12	Toronto Toros	4–2	Cleveland Crusaders	3-0
4	April 13	Toronto Toros	2–3 OT	Cleveland Crusaders	3-1
5	April 15	Cleveland Crusaders	1–4	Toronto Toros	4-1

Semifinals vs. Chicago Cougars – Cougars win 4–3

Game	Date	Visitor	Score	Home	Series
1	April 19	Chicago Cougars	4–6	Toronto Toros	1-0
2	April 22	Chicago Cougars	4–3	Toronto Toros	1-1
3	April 28	Toronto Toros	2–3	Chicago Cougars	1-2
4	April 30	Toronto Toros	7–6	Chicago Cougars	2-2
5	May 1	Chicago Cougars	3–5	Toronto Toros	3-2
6	May 4	Toronto Toros	2–9	Chicago Cougars	3-3
7	May 6	Chicago Cougars	5–2	Toronto Toros	3-4

Legend: Win Loss

== Player statistics ==
=== Regular season ===
Scoring leaders

Player	GP	G	A	Pts	PIM
Wayne Carleton	78	37	55	92	31
Gavin Kirk	78	20	48	68	44
Wayne Dillon	78	30	35	65	13
Guy Trottier	71	27	35	62	58
Rick Sentes	64	26	34	60	46

Goaltending

Player	GP	TOI	W	L	T	GA	SO	GAA	Save %
Bill Holden	1	10	1	0	0	0	0	0.00	1.000
Frank Blum	5	131	1	0	0	5	0	2.29	.924
Les Binkley	27	1412	14	9	1	77	1	3.27	.901
Gilles Gratton	57	3200	26	24	3	188	2	3.53	.895

=== Playoff stats ===
Scoring leaders

Player	GP	G	A	Pts	PIM
Wayne Carleton	12	2	12	14	4
Rick Sentes	12	7	4	11	19
Wayne Dillon	12	5	6	11	9
Tom Martin	12	7	3	10	2
Guy Trottier	12	5	5	10	4

Goaltending

Player	GP	TOI	W	L	GA	SO	GAA	Save %
Gilles Gratton	10	539	5	3	25	1	2.78	
Les Binkley	5	182	2	2	17	0	5.60	

== Draft picks ==
Toronto's draft picks at the 1973 WHA Amateur Draft.

Round	#	Player	Nationality	College/Junior/Club team (League)
1	4	Paulin Bordeleau	Canada	Toronto Marlboros (OHA)
2	18	Pat Hickey	Canada	Hamilton Red Wings (OHA)
4	43	Peter Marrin	Canada	Toronto Marlboros (OHA)
5	52	Bob Dailey	Canada	Toronto Marlboros (OHA)
5	56	Lou Nistico	Canada	London Knights (OHA)
6	69	Doug Ferguson	Canada	Hamilton Red Wings (OHA)
7	78	Gerrard Gibbons	Canada	St. Mary's University (CIAU)
7	82	Gord Titcomb	Canada	St. Catharines Black Hawks (OHA)
8	95	John Campbell	Canada	Sault Ste. Marie Greyhounds (OHA)
9	106	Guido Tenesi	United States	Oshawa Generals (OHA)

== See also ==
- 1973–74 WHA season
