= Cleveland Crusaders =

Former ice hockey team of the World Hockey Association

- City: Cleveland, Ohio
- League: World Hockey Association
- Operated: 1972–1976
- Home arena: Cleveland Arena (1972–74); Richfield Coliseum (1974–76).
- Colors: Purple, black, white
- Media: WUAB; WHK

Franchise history
- 1972 (did not play): Calgary Broncos
- 1972–1976: Cleveland Crusaders
- 1976–1977: Minnesota Fighting Saints

The Cleveland Crusaders were a professional ice hockey team from Cleveland. They played in the World Hockey Association from 1972 to 1976. Their home ice was the Cleveland Arena from 1972 to 1974, and the Richfield Coliseum from 1974 to 1976.

== History ==
The team was owned by Nick Mileti, who had been the founder of the NBA's Cleveland Cavaliers, and also owned Major League Baseball's Cleveland Indians. Mileti had made a bid for a franchise in the National Hockey League but was denied. He had also owned the nine-time American Hockey League champion Cleveland Barons, but moved them to Jacksonville, Florida to make room for the Crusaders. On July 27, 1972, the Crusaders made their first big signing when they signed Gerry Cheevers, star goalie of the Boston Bruins to the WHA in a move that Cheevers stated was for "the security of my family". The first coach for the Crusaders was Bill Needham, a mainstay of the Barons. Needham coached the Crusaders to winning records in the first two seasons but failed to advance past the second playoff round. In the 1974–75 season, John Hanna took over as coach, to be replaced mid-season by Jack Vivian. Cleveland finished second in the east division despite a losing record, but fell in the first round of the playoffs. Johnny Wilson led the team for its final season, also losing in the first round of the post-season.

Mileti sold the team to Jay White in 1975, but White sold it back to Mileti in 1976. In that year, the Crusaders hosted the 1976 WHA All-Star Game at the Richfield Coliseum on January 13, 1976. However, not long after Mileti closed on his repurchase, the National Hockey League's California Golden Seals moved to Cleveland and became the Cleveland Barons. Mileti knew he could not hope to compete with an NHL team and decided to move the Crusaders elsewhere.

By July 1976, a deal with Atlanta businessman Bill Putnam was announced but not fully consummated. He aimed to purchase a team and play in Hollywood, Florida with "orange and turquoise blue colors", and he even debated just buying the San Diego Mariners and moving them to Florida if unable to buy the Crusaders. Putnam planned to name the team the Florida Breakers, going far enough to have a logo designed. After the proposed move fell through, the Crusaders relocated to St. Paul, Minnesota, becoming the second incarnation of the Minnesota Fighting Saints.

== Players ==
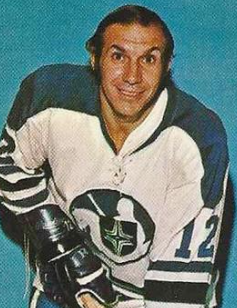
Gary Jarrett, the all-time leading scorer for Cleveland.

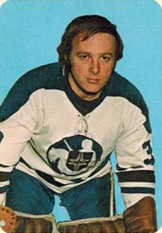
Gerry Cheevers, Crusaders goaltender and future Hockey Hall of Famer

Gary Jarrett was the Crusaders top scorer in their four seasons, playing in 298 games, scoring 104 goals, 119 assists, totalling 223 points. Gerry Pinder played the most games in a Crusader uniform, 304 in total. Other notable Crusaders players included Paul Shmyr (538 penalty minutes in four seasons), netminder Gerry Cheevers (99 wins in four seasons), and defenseman Wayne Hillman. Cheevers won the inaugural Ben Hatskin Trophy for his goaltending in 1973. Seven Crusaders were named to an WHA All-Star Team in their history, with Paul Shmyr being named to the First-Team three times (1972–73, 1973–74, 1975–76) and Cheevers being named a First-Team once and Second Team twice.

The last active Crusaders player in major professional hockey was Paul Baxter, who last played the 1986-87 NHL season.

== Season-by-season record ==
Note: GP = Games played, W = Wins, L = Losses, T = Ties, Pts = Points, GF = Goals for, GA = Goals against, PIM = Penalties in minutes

Season	GP	W	L	T	Pts	GF	GA	PIM	Finish	Playoffs	Avg. attendance
1972–73	78	43	32	3	89	287	239	1095	2nd, Eastern	Won quarter-final (Blazers); Lost semi-final (Whalers)	5,287
1973–74	78	37	32	9	83	266	264	1007	3rd, Eastern	Lost quarter-final (Toros)	6,212
1974–75	78	35	40	3	73	236	258	1273	2nd, Eastern	Lost quarter-final (Aeros)	6,931
1975–76	80	35	40	5	75	273	279	1356	2nd, Eastern	Lost preliminary round (Whalers)	6,356
Totals	314	150	144	20	320	1062	1040	4731			6,197
