= Kirk Bowman =

Canadian ice hockey player (born 1951)

- Born: September 30, 1951 (age 74) Leamington, Ontario, Canada
- Height: 5 ft 9 in (175 cm)
- Weight: 178 lb (81 kg; 12 st 10 lb)
- Position: Left wing
- Shot: Left
- Played for: Los Angeles Sharks; Chicago Black Hawks; Schwenninger Wild Wings; SC Bern
- NHL draft: Undrafted
- Playing career: 1971–1988

Robert Kirk Bowman (born September 30, 1951) is a Canadian retired professional ice hockey winger. He played 10 games in the World Hockey Association with the Los Angeles Sharks during the 1973–74 season and 88 games in the National Hockey League for the Chicago Black Hawks between 1976 and 1979. He currently does periodic work on behalf of the Blackhawk Alumni Association.

== Career statistics ==
=== Regular season and playoffs ===
			Regular season					Playoffs
Season	Team	League	GP	G	A	Pts	PIM	GP	G	A	Pts	PIM
1967–68	Leamington Flyers	WOJBHL	—	—	—	—	—	—	—	—	—	—
1969–70	Sarnia Legionnaires	WOJAHL	—	—	—	—	—	—	—	—	—	—
1970–71	Guelph GMC's	SOJHL	44	42	29	71	—	—	—	—	—	—
1971–72	Columbus Golden Seals	IHL	9	10	8	18	9	—	—	—	—	—
1971–72	Greensboro Generals	EHL	46	15	15	30	19	11	4	5	9	6
1972–73	Greensboro Generals	EHL	70	27	51	78	23	7	1	8	9	0
1972–73	Flint Generals	IHL	—	—	—	—	—	1	1	2	3	0
1973–74	Los Angeles Sharks	WHA	10	0	2	2	0	—	—	—	—	—
1973–74	Greensboro Generals	SHL	58	23	55	78	20	6	1	8	9	0
1974–75	Flint Generals	IHL	75	29	79	108	62	5	2	5	7	2
1974–75	Dallas Black Hawks	CHL	—	—	—	—	—	4	0	3	3	0
1975–76	Flint Generals	IHL	78	44	63	107	12	4	2	3	5	5
1975–76	Dallas Black Hawks	CHL	—	—	—	—	—	10	3	8	11	4
1976–77	Chicago Black Hawks	NHL	55	10	13	23	6	2	1	0	1	0
1976–77	Flint Generals	IHL	11	5	14	19	2	—	—	—	—	—
1977–78	Chicago Black Hawks	NHL	33	1	4	5	13	3	0	0	0	0
1977–78	Dallas Black Hawks	CHL	39	10	23	33	6	—	—	—	—	—
1978–79	Chicago Black Hawks	NHL	—	—	—	—	—	2	0	0	0	0
1978–79	New Brunswick Hawks	AHL	80	26	56	82	44	5	2	3	5	2
1979–80	Schwenninger ERC	GER-2	44	48	46	94	—	—	—	—	—	—
1981–82	Schwenninger ERC	GER	44	35	36	71	33	—	—	—	—	—
1982–83	Schwenninger ERC	GER	36	21	16	37	14	8	3	4	7	0
1983–84	Schwenninger ERC	GER	35	22	22	44	40	10	6	11	17	—
1984–85	SC Bern	NLB	40	45	25	70	—	—	—	—	—	—
1985–86	SC Bern	NLB	35	37	41	78	20	5	4	2	6	4
1986–87	SC Bern	NLA	32	30	44	74	16	—	—	—	—	—
1987–88	SC Bern	NLA	29	11	27	38	22	—	—	—	—	—
IHL totals			183	88	164	252	85	10	5	10	15	7
WHA totals			10	0	2	2	0	—	—	—	—	—
NHL totals			88	11	17	28	19	7	1	0	1	0
AHL totals			80	26	56	82	44	5	2	3	5	2
GER totals			125	84	85	169	81	—	—	—	—	—
NLB totals			75	82	66	148	20	5	4	2	6	4
NLA totals			61	41	71	112	38	—	—	—	—	—
