= Dennis Abgrall =

Canadian ice hockey player (born 1953)

- Born: April 24, 1953 (age 73) Moosomin, Saskatchewan, Canada
- Height: 6 ft 0 in (183 cm)
- Weight: 180 lb (82 kg; 12 st 12 lb)
- Position: Right wing
- Shot: Right
- Played for: Los Angeles Kings; Cincinnati Stingers; Liege CPL
- NHL draft: 70th overall, 1973; Los Angeles Kings
- WHA draft: 60th overall, 1973; Los Angeles Sharks
- Playing career: 1973–1982

Dennis Harvey Abgrall (born April 24, 1953) is a Canadian former professional ice hockey player. He played 13 games in the National Hockey League and 145 games in World Hockey Association between 1975 and 1978. Abgrall was born in Moosomin, Saskatchewan.

He was previously employed as a French teacher at the Arizona School for the Arts.

== Playing career ==
Dennis Abgrall was drafted by the Los Angeles Kings of the NHL in the 1973 NHL Amateur Draft in the fifth round, 70th overall and by the Los Angeles Sharks of the WHA in the 1973 WHA Amateur Draft in the fifth round, 60th overall.

Abgrall did not break into either league, though, until he played 13 games for the Kings in the 1975–76 season. Those 13 games would be his only in the NHL and on June 1, 1976, the Cincinnati Stingers of the WHA signed him to a contract. He would play two seasons, 1976–77 and 1977–78, for the Stingers. The Winnipeg Jets selected Abgrall from the Kings in the 1979 NHL Expansion Draft, although he would never play for that organization. His playing career would end with two seasons in various European leagues.

== Teaching career ==
Dennis Abgrall currently teaches various levels of French at North High School. Prior to North High School, Abgrall taught English at Desert Vista High School. He also taught French at Arizona School for the Arts as well as Ironwood High School.

== Career statistics ==
=== Regular season and playoffs ===
			Regular season					Playoffs
Season	Team	League	GP	G	A	Pts	PIM	GP	G	A	Pts	PIM
1969–70	Moose Jaw Canucks	SJHL	30	6	5	11	18	4	0	0	0	2
1970–71	Saskatoon Blades	WCHL	64	31	43	74	25	—	—	—	—	—
1971–72	Saskatoon Blades	WCHL	64	29	38	67	58	—	—	—	—	—
1972–73	Saskatoon Blades	WCHL	68	30	39	69	36	—	—	—	—	—
1973–74	Portland Buckaroos	WHL	78	27	41	68	37	10	2	7	9	8
1975–76	Springfield Indians	AHL	75	25	40	65	23	17	9	11	20	8
1975–76	Los Angeles Kings	NHL	13	0	2	2	4	—	—	—	—	—
1975–76	Fort Worth Texans	CHL	64	21	36	57	34	—	—	—	—	—
1976–77	Cincinnati Stingers	WHA	80	23	39	62	22	4	2	0	2	5
1977–78	Cincinnati Stingers	WHA	65	13	11	24	13	—	—	—	—	—
1978–79	Broome Dusters	AHL	6	0	0	0	0	—	—	—	—	—
1978–79	Erie Blades	NEHL	56	30	49	79	8	12	8	12	20	12
1979–80	EC Bad Tölz	GER-2	30	23	25	48	44	—	—	—	—	—
1980–81	EC Bad Tölz	GER-2	—	—	—	—	—	—	—	—	—	—
1981–82	Liege CPL	BEL	23	46	32	78	16	—	—	—	—	—
NHL totals			13	0	2	2	4	—	—	—	—	—
