= Sarnia Legionnaires =

Sarnia Legionnaires may refer to:

- Sarnia Legionnaires (1954–1970), defunct Canadian junior ice hockey team
- Sarnia Legionnaires (GOJHL), Canadian junior ice hockey team in the Greater Ontario Junior Hockey League
