= Eric Vail =

Canadian ice hockey player (born 1953)

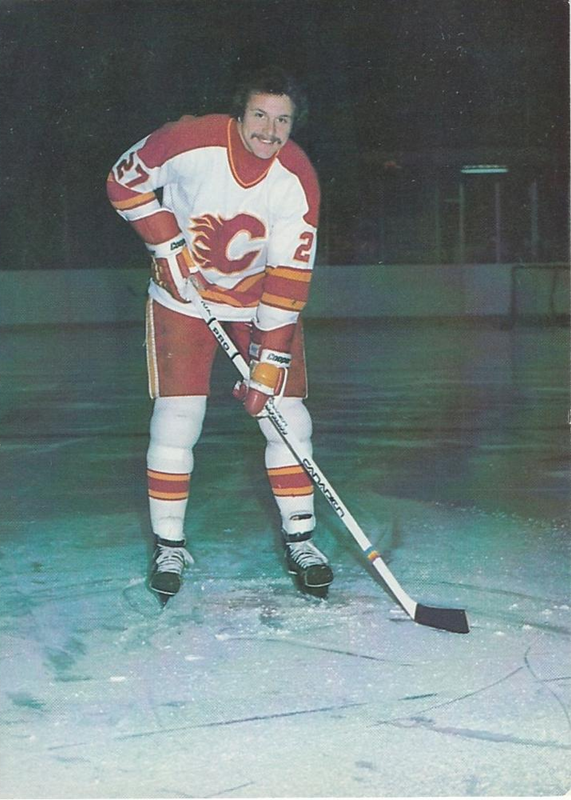
- Vail in 1980 photo
- Born: September 16, 1953 (age 72) Timmins, Ontario, Canada
- Height: 6 ft 1 in (185 cm)
- Weight: 220 lb (100 kg; 15 st 10 lb)
- Position: Left wing
- Shot: Left
- Played for: Atlanta Flames; Calgary Flames; Detroit Red Wings
- National team: Canada
- NHL draft: 21st overall, 1973; Atlanta Flames
- WHA draft: 29th overall, 1973; Quebec Nordiques
- Playing career: 1973–1983

Eric Vail (born September 16, 1953) is a Canadian former ice hockey player who played nine seasons in the National Hockey League (NHL) for the Atlanta Flames, Calgary Flames and Detroit Red Wings. He helped Calgary reach the 1981 NHL playoff semifinals for the first time in club history.

He won the Calder Memorial Trophy in 1975 as the NHL's rookie of the year and played in the 1977 NHL All-Star Game. Also in 1977, Vail played with Team Canada at the World Ice Hockey Championship. At the time of his 1981 trade to Detroit, Vail was the Flames' franchise leader in goal scoring.

== Playing career ==
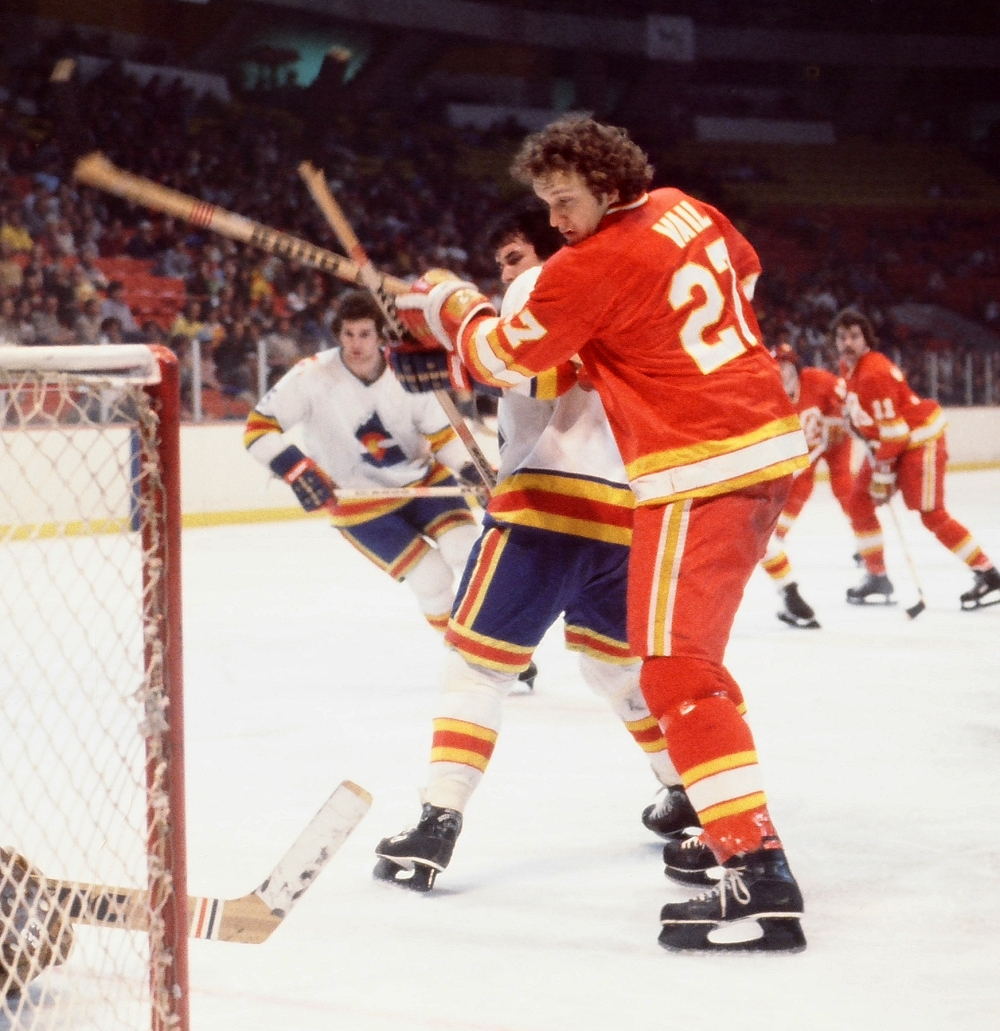
Vail (right) with the Atlanta Flames in 1978

Vail played three years of junior hockey in the Ontario Hockey Association (OHA). He spent two seasons with the Niagara Falls Flyers, scoring 48 points in 59 games in 1970–71 and improving to 73 points in 60 games in 1971–72. He split the 1972–73 OHA season between the Sault Ste. Marie Greyhounds and the Sudbury Wolves, scoring 48 goals and 105 points combined between the two teams. Vail was selected by both the Atlanta Flames, 21st overall at the 1973 NHL Amateur Draft and the Quebec Nordiques, 29th overall at the 1973 WHA Amateur Draft.

Choosing to play with the Flames, Vail made his NHL debut in 1973–74, appearing in 23 games. He scored two goals and nine assists, but spent the majority of the season in the Central Hockey League (CHL) with the Omaha Knights. Since he played fewer than 25 NHL games in his first season, Vail was still considered a rookie in 1974–75. He led all rookies with 39 goals and had 60 points on the campaign. Vail won the Calder Memorial Trophy as the NHL's rookie of the year, the first player in Flames history to do so.

Injuries reduced Vail's offensive output in 1975–76 as he scored only 16 goals. Vail rebounded to score 32 goals and 71 points in 1976–77. He played in the 1977 NHL All-Star Game, the only such appearance of his career. He also made his only appearance with the national team, scoring four goals in nine games for the fourth place Canadians at the World Ice Hockey Championship.

Vail scored 22, 35 and 28 goals in his following three seasons and set a career high with 83 points in 1978–79. In 1979–80, Vail passed Tom Lysiak as the Flames' all-time leading goal scorer. His 174 career goals was the most in the Flames' tenure in Atlanta, and he was second to Lysiak with 383 points. Vail transferred with the franchise when it relocated to Canada, becoming the Calgary Flames in 1980–81. He had 28 goals and 64 points in 64 games in his first season in Calgary.

Though he averaged nearly 30 goals per season, the Flames often felt Vail was playing below his capability. He was considered to have one of the best shots in the league, but was often accused of coasting on the ice and carried a reputation for "living large" off the ice. He clashed with head coach Al MacNeil, forcing the team to make a move early in the 1981–82 season. Stating that "Eric Vail and the Calgary Flames were no longer compatible", General Manager Cliff Fletcher sent the team's all-time leading scorer to the Detroit Red Wings in exchange for Gary McAdam and a draft pick on November 10, 1981. Vail scored 10 goals in 52 games with Detroit.

The Red Wings were similarly frustrated with Vail. They demoted him to the Adirondack Red Wings, their American Hockey League (AHL) affiliate, for ten games in 1981–82, then left him there for the entire 1982–83 AHL season. Vail scored 20 goals and 49 points for Adirondack then retired following the season.

== Personal life ==
Vail and his ex-wife Sylvia have two children: Scott and Natasha. He returned to Atlanta following his career, ultimately settling in Lawrenceville, Georgia, where he managed a nightclub. When the NHL returned to Atlanta in 1999, Vail joined the Thrashers organization in a community relations capacity and served as an in-arena analyst for the team's radio broadcasts.

== Career statistics ==
=== Regular season and playoffs ===
			Regular season					Playoffs
Season	Team	League	GP	G	A	Pts	PIM	GP	G	A	Pts	PIM
1969–70	Sarnia Legionnaires	WOJHL	—	—	—	—	—	—	—	—	—	—
1970–71	Niagara Falls Flyers	OHA	59	18	30	48	76	—	—	—	—	—
1971–72	Niagara Falls Flyers	OHA	60	25	48	73	122	—	—	—	—	—
1972–73	Sault Ste. Marie Greyhounds	OHA	38	29	31	60	50	—	—	—	—	—
1972–73	Sudbury Wolves	OHA	25	19	26	45	30	4	1	1	2	2
1973–74	Omaha Knights	CHL	37	10	18	28	54	—	—	—	—	—
1973–74	Atlanta Flames	NHL	23	2	9	11	30	1	0	0	0	2
1974–75	Atlanta Flames	NHL	72	39	21	60	46	—	—	—	—	—
1975–76	Atlanta Flames	NHL	60	16	31	47	34	2	0	0	0	0
1976–77	Atlanta Flames	NHL	78	32	39	71	22	3	1	3	4	0
1977–78	Atlanta Flames	NHL	79	22	36	58	16	2	1	1	2	0
1978–79	Atlanta Flames	NHL	80	35	48	83	53	2	0	1	1	2
1979–80	Atlanta Flames	NHL	77	28	25	53	22	4	3	1	4	2
1980–81	Calgary Flames	NHL	64	28	36	64	23	6	0	0	0	0
1981–82	Calgary Flames	NHL	6	4	1	5	0	—	—	—	—	—
1981–82	Oklahoma City Stars	CHL	3	0	3	3	0	—	—	—	—	—
1981–82	Detroit Red Wings	NHL	52	10	14	24	35	—	—	—	—	—
1981–82	Adirondack Red Wings	AHL	10	3	4	7	0	—	—	—	—	—
1982–83	Adirondack Red Wings	AHL	74	20	29	49	33	5	1	1	2	0
NHL totals			591	216	260	476	281	20	5	6	11	6

=== International ===
Year	Team	Event	GP	G	A	Pts	PIM
1977	Canada	WC	9	4	1	5	18
Senior totals			9	4	1	5	18

Preceded by Denis Potvin	Winner of the Calder Memorial Trophy; 1975	Succeeded by Bryan Trottier
