= Peter Mara =

Canadian ice hockey player

- Born: July 5, 1947 (age 79) Point Edward, Ontario, Canada
- Height: 5 ft 6 in (168 cm)
- Weight: 152 lb (69 kg; 10 st 12 lb)
- Position: Forward
- Shot: Left
- Played for: Chicago Cougars; Denver Spurs; Ottawa Civics
- Playing career: 1968–1977

Peter John Mara (born July 5, 1947) is a Canadian former professional ice hockey forward.

== Early life ==
Mara was born in Point Edward, Ontario. He played junior hockey with the Sarnia Legionnaires. He was twice named MVP of the Western Ontario Junior B in 1964-65 and 1965-66, and then moved to the Junior A OHA league's St. Catharines team.

== Career ==
Mara played 107 games in the World Hockey Association with the Chicago Cougars, Denver Spurs, and Ottawa Civics. During the 1973–1974 season, while playing for the Des Moines Capitols, Peter Mara was awarded the Leo P. Lamoureux Memorial Trophy as the league's leading scorer and the James Gatschene Memorial Trophy for outstanding playing ability and sportsmanlike conduct.

== Career statistics ==
=== Regular season and playoffs ===
| | | | Regular season | | | | | Playoffs |
| Season | Team | League | GP | G | A | Pts | PIM | GP | G | A | Pts | PIM |
|---|---|---|---|---|---|---|---|---|---|---|---|---|
| 1964–65 | Sarnia Legionnaires | WOJBHL | Statistics Unavailable |
| 1965-66 | Sarnia Legionnaires | WOJHL | 40 | 42 | 36 | 78 | 17 |
| 1966–67 | St. Catharines Black Hawks | OHA | 38 | 15 | 14 | 29 | 16 | –– | –– | –– | –– | –– |
| 1967–68 | St. Catharines Black Hawks | OHA | 46 | 12 | 17 | 29 | 15 | –– | –– | –– | –– | –– |
| 1968–69 | Port Huron Flags | IHL | 66 | 24 | 38 | 62 | 12 | 3 | 2 | 1 | 3 | 0 |
| 1969–70 | Port Huron–Des Moine | IHL | 68 | 27 | 32 | 59 | 12 | 8 | 4 | 5 | 9 | 0 |
| 1970–71 | Flint–Des Moines | IHL | 65 | 24 | 38 | 62 | 6 | 14 | 9 | 7 | 16 | 4 |
| 1971–72 | Des Moines Oak Leafs | IHL | 70 | 24 | 38 | 62 | 14 | 3 | 0 | 2 | 2 | 0 |
| 1972–73 | Des Moines Capitols | IHL | 74 | 38 | 59 | 97 | 34 | 3 | 0 | 2 | 2 | 0 |
| 1973–74 | Des Moines Capitols | IHL | 75 | 44 | 71 | 115 | 33 | 10 | 7 | 6 | 13 | 4 |
| 1974–75 | Long Island Cougars | NAHL | 14 | 6 | 11 | 17 | 23 | 7 | 3 | 5 | 8 | 4 |
| 1974–75 | Chicago Cougars | WHA | 67 | 17 | 21 | 38 | 16 | –– | –– | –– | –– | –– |
| 1975–76 | Erie Blades | NAHL | 13 | 2 | 8 | 10 | 4 | 4 | 0 | 2 | 2 | 0 |
| 1975–76 | Denver Spurs/Ottawa Civics | WHA | 40 | 3 | 7 | 10 | 8 | –– | –– | –– | –– | –– |
| 1976–77 | Erie Blades | NAHL | 39 | 8 | 18 | 26 | 4 | –– | –– | –– | –– | –– |
| 1976–77 | Syracuse Blazers | NAHL | 33 | 15 | 31 | 46 | 4 | 9 | 5 | 9 | 14 | 2 |
| WHA totals | | | 107 | 20 | 28 | 48 | 24 | — | — | — | — | — |
