= Mike Stapleton =

Canadian ice hockey player

- Born: May 5, 1966 (age 60) Sarnia, Ontario, Canada
- Height: 5 ft 10 in (178 cm)
- Weight: 183 lb (83 kg; 13 st 1 lb)
- Position: Centre
- Shot: Right
- Played for: Chicago Blackhawks; Pittsburgh Penguins; Edmonton Oilers; Winnipeg Jets; Phoenix Coyotes; Atlanta Thrashers; New York Islanders; Vancouver Canucks
- National team: Canada
- NHL draft: 132nd overall, 1984; Chicago Black Hawks
- Playing career: 1986–2004

Michael Patrick Stapleton (born May 5, 1966) is a Canadian former professional ice hockey player who played fourteen seasons in the National Hockey League from 1986 until 2001. Throughout his career Stapleton played for the Chicago Blackhawks, Pittsburgh Penguins, Edmonton Oilers, Winnipeg Jets, Phoenix Coyotes, Atlanta Thrashers, New York Islanders and Vancouver Canucks. After leaving the NHL he spent several years playing in Europe, retiring in 2004. The son of former NHL player Pat Stapleton, he also played internationally for Canada at the 1986 World Junior Championships, winning a silver medal. After his playing career ended Stapleton served as a coach and since 2014 has been a scout with the Anaheim Ducks.

== Playing career ==
=== Junior ===
Stapleton played Junior B hockey for the Strathroy Blades and Junior A hockey in the Ontario Hockey League for the Cornwall Royals, where he scored 104 goals and 258 points over three seasons and 182 games. He was rated OHL Leyden Division's hardest worker, best faceoff man and best penalty killer in a 1985–86 poll of league coaches.

=== NHL ===
He was drafted by the Chicago Blackhawks #132 overall in the 1984 NHL entry draft. He played 697 NHL games for seven different teams, netting 71 goals and 182 points along with 342 penalty minutes.

=== Europe ===
In 2001, Stapleton moved to Finland's SM-liiga and played for the Espoo Blues, scoring 18 goals and 37 points in 41 games. He then had a brief spell in the Swedish Elitserien for Leksands IF before returning to Espoo. He spent one more season in Finland for Tappara before retiring in 2004.

== International career ==
Medal record

Representing Canada

World Junior Championships
Silver medal – second place	1986 Canada	

Stapleton was named to the Canadian national junior team for the 1986 World Junior Ice Hockey Championships. Scoring 6 points in 7 games, Stapleton helped the team win the silver medal.

== Coaching career ==
Stapleton served as an assistant to head coach/GM Scott Gardiner with the NAHL's Traverse City North Stars during the club's inaugural 2005–06 season before accepting a position as associate coach of the OHL's Erie Otters. He accepted a position to become the new assistant coach for the Syracuse Crunch of the AHL in the 2010-11 American Hockey League season. He served as the head coach of the Ontario Hockey League's Sault Ste. Marie Greyhounds for the 2011–12 season and part of the 2012–2013 season. He was fired on December 3, 2012 and replaced by Sheldon Keefe.

== Personal life ==
Stapleton is the son of former NHL defenceman and 1972 Summit Series Team Canada member Pat Stapleton. Stapleton and his wife Laura and have two sons, Luke and Nick.

=== Regular season and playoffs ===
			Regular season					Playoffs
Season	Team	League	GP	G	A	Pts	PIM	GP	G	A	Pts	PIM
1981–82	Strathroy Blades	WOHL	42	25	18	43	38	—	—	—	—	—
1982–83	Strathroy Blades	WOHL	40	39	38	77	99	3	1	2	3	4
1983–84	Cornwall Royals	OHL	70	24	45	69	94	3	1	2	3	4
1984–85	Cornwall Royals	OHL	56	41	44	85	68	9	2	4	6	23
1985–86	Cornwall Royals	OHL	56	39	65	104	74	6	2	3	5	2
1986–87	Chicago Blackhawks	NHL	39	3	6	9	6	4	0	0	0	2
1986–87	Canadian National Team	Intl	21	2	4	6	4	—	—	—	—	—
1987–88	Saginaw Hawks	IHL	31	11	19	30	52	10	5	6	11	10
1987–88	Chicago Blackhawks	NHL	43	2	9	11	59	—	—	—	—	—
1988–89	Saginaw Hawks	IHL	69	21	47	68	162	6	1	3	4	4
1988–89	Chicago Blackhawks	NHL	7	0	1	1	7	—	—	—	—	—
1989–90	Arvika	SWE-2	32	15	19	34	49	—	—	—	—	—
1989–90	Indianapolis Ice	IHL	16	5	10	15	6	13	9	10	19	38
1990–91	Indianapolis Ice	IHL	75	29	52	81	76	7	1	4	5	0
1990–91	Chicago Blackhawks	NHL	7	0	1	1	2	—	—	—	—	—
1991–92	Indianapolis Ice	IHL	59	18	40	58	65	—	—	—	—	—
1991–92	Chicago Blackhawks	NHL	19	4	4	8	8	—	—	—	—	—
1992–93	Pittsburgh Penguins	NHL	78	4	9	13	10	4	0	0	0	0
1993–94	Pittsburgh Penguins	NHL	58	7	4	11	18	—	—	—	—	—
1993–94	Edmonton Oilers	NHL	23	5	9	14	28	—	—	—	—	—
1994–95	Edmonton Oilers	NHL	46	6	11	17	21	—	—	—	—	—
1995–96	Winnipeg Jets	NHL	58	10	14	24	37	6	0	0	0	21
1996–97	Phoenix Coyotes	NHL	55	4	11	15	36	7	0	0	0	14
1997–98	Phoenix Coyotes	NHL	64	5	5	10	36	6	0	0	0	2
1998–99	Phoenix Coyotes	NHL	76	9	9	18	34	7	1	0	1	0
1999–00	Atlanta Thrashers	NHL	62	10	12	22	30	—	—	—	—	—
2000–01	New York Islanders	NHL	34	1	4	5	2	—	—	—	—	—
2000–01	Vancouver Canucks	NHL	18	1	2	3	8	—	—	—	—	—
2001–02	Blues	FIN	41	18	19	37	42	3	0	0	0	4
2002–03	Leksand	SWE	19	5	5	10	10	—	—	—	—	—
2002–03	Blues	FIN	33	8	20	28	55	7	1	2	3	10
2003–04	Tappara	FIN	18	6	12	18	26	3	1	1	2	2
NHL totals			687	71	111	182	342	34	1	0	1	39

=== International ===
Year	Team	Event	GP	G	A	Pts	PIM
1986	Canada	WJC	7	3	3	6	6
Junior totals			7	3	3	6	7
