= Pat Stapleton (ice hockey) =

Canadian ice hockey player (1940–2020)

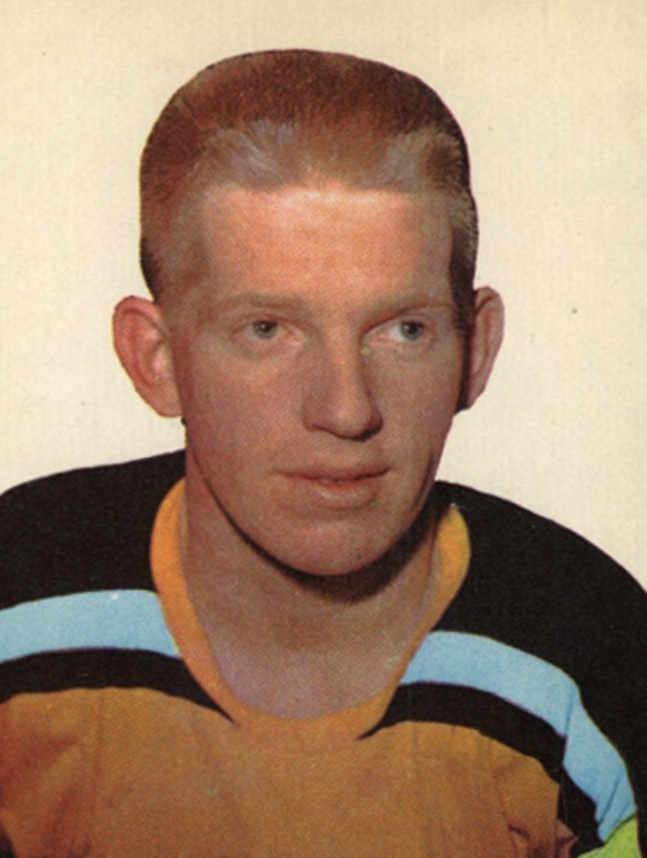
- Stapleton with the Boston Bruins in 1962
- Born: July 4, 1940 Sarnia, Ontario, Canada
- Died: April 8, 2020 (aged 79) London, Ontario, Canada
- Height: 5 ft 9 in (175 cm)
- Weight: 180 lb (82 kg; 12 st 12 lb)
- Position: Defence
- Shot: Left
- Played for: Boston Bruins; Chicago Black Hawks; Chicago Cougars; Indianapolis Racers; Cincinnati Stingers
- National team: Canada
- Playing career: 1959–1978

Patrick James "Whitey" Stapleton (July 4, 1940 – April 8, 2020) was a Canadian ice hockey player. A defenceman, Stapleton played 15 seasons in the National Hockey League (NHL) and the World Hockey Association (WHA), most notably for the Chicago Black Hawks. He was the father of Mike Stapleton, who had a lengthy career in the NHL.

== Playing career ==
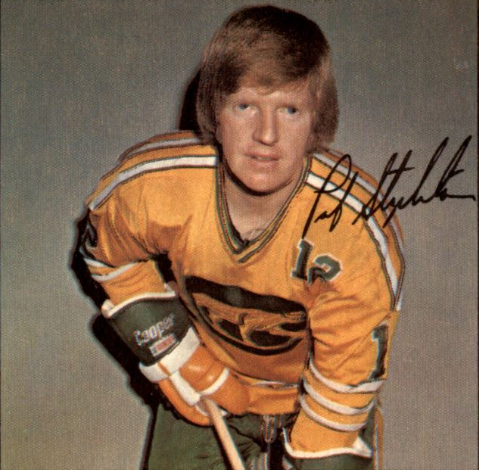
1974 card of Stapleton with the Chicago Cougars

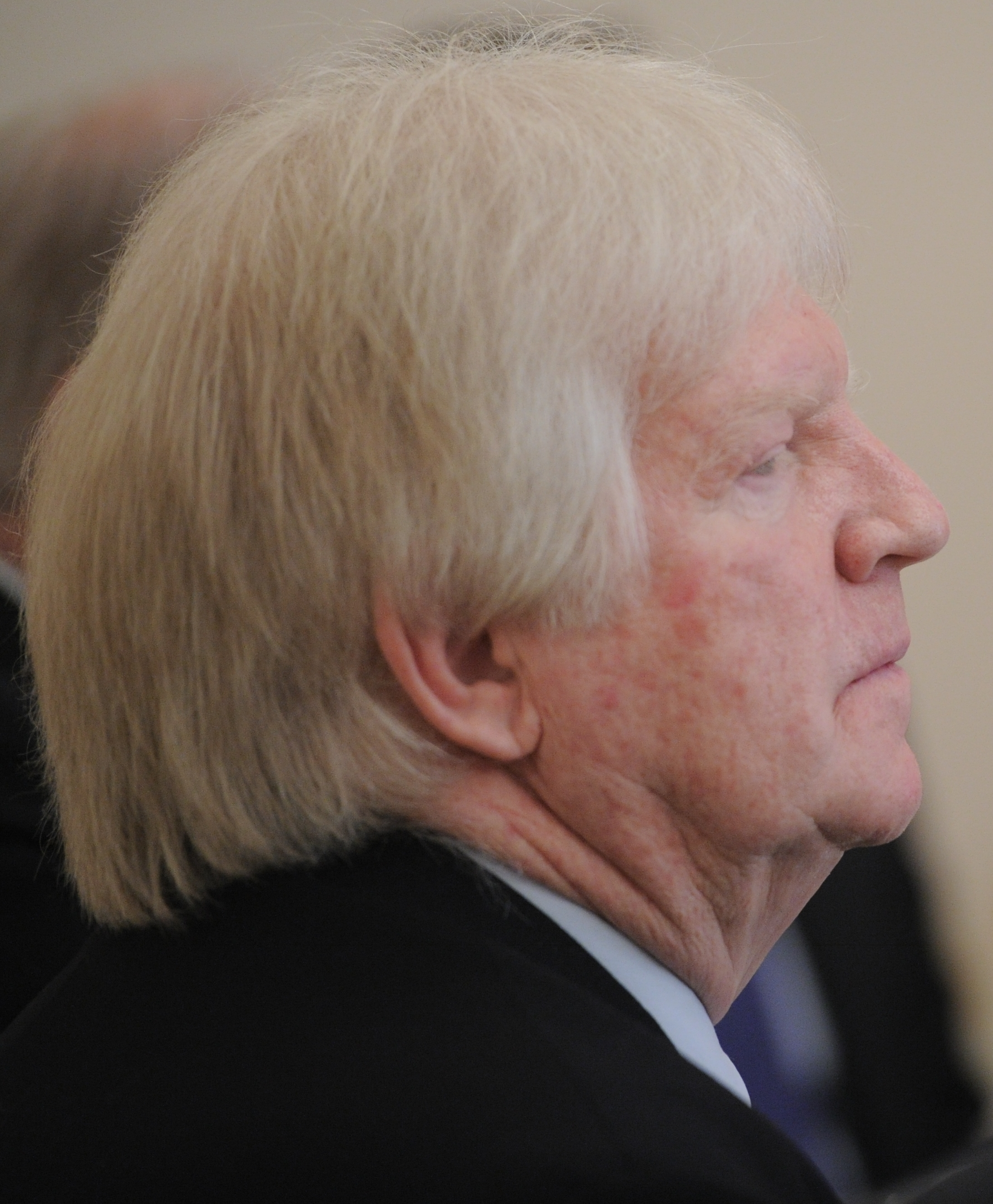
Pat Stapleton in Moscow at a meeting of participants of the 1972 Summit Series, February 24, 2012.

Stapleton played Junior B hockey with the Sarnia Legionnaires before spending two seasons with the St. Catharines Teepees of the Ontario Hockey Association, winning the Memorial Cup in 1960. With the Legionnaires he won two Western Jr. 'B' championships and one Sutherland Cup as an all-Ontario champion. Although he was a defenceman, he led the Legionnaires in scoring during his second season.

His first full season was with the Sault Thunderbirds of the Eastern Professional Hockey League in 1960–61. Stapleton had signed with the Chicago Black Hawks, but was claimed by the Boston Bruins in the intra-league draft in June 1961 and began his National Hockey League career with the Bruins in the 1961–62 season. The next year, he split his time between Bruins and their EPHL affiliate, the Kingston Frontenacs. Stapleton spent the next two years in the minor leagues, playing with the Portland Buckaroos of the Western Hockey League. He received the Hal Laycoe Cup as the WHL's top defenceman for the 1964–65 season.

Stapleton was briefly the property of the Toronto Maple Leafs in June 1965 as part of a trade with the Bruins, but he was left unprotected in the intra-league draft and was claimed the next day by the Chicago Black Hawks. Wearing number 7, he played some games with the Hawks' Central Hockey league affiliate, the St. Louis Braves, in 1965–66, but they would be the final minor league games of his career. Stapleton remained in the NHL for eight seasons with the Black Hawks, and was named Second Team All-Star three times (1966, 1971, and 1972). Stapleton played with the Black Hawks in the Stanley Cup finals in 1971 and 1973. His highest scoring season was 1969, where his 50 assists set a new NHL record for assists in a season by a defenceman (broken the next year by Bobby Orr).

Stapleton was a member of the Team Canada team at the Summit Series in 1972. During the tournament he was a +6 and was often paired with his Black Hawks teammate Bill White. It is believed that Stapleton is the owner of the puck used by Paul Henderson to score the series-winning goal. Stapleton himself admits that he does not know which one of the hundreds of pucks he owns is that game winning one, though it is in his possession.

In 1973, Stapleton jumped from the NHL and signed a five-year deal with the Chicago Cougars of the World Hockey Association (WHA) where he became player-coach, replacing Marcel Pronovost as coach. He was a WHA first-team all-star in 1974 and won the Dennis A. Murphy Trophy as the league's top defenceman in the 1973–74 season.

Stapleton again represented Canada in the 1974 Summit Series against the national team from the Soviet Union, this time as team captain, recording three assists in eight games. He was again player-coach of the Cougars in 1974–75, and the team struggled on the ice and financially. In December 1974, he and teammates Dave Dryden and Ralph Backstrom bought the troubled franchise. At the time, Stapleton also owned two small arenas in the Chicago area along with other business interests.

The Cougars folded after the 1974–75 season and Stapleton was claimed by the Indianapolis Racers, where he played for two seasons and was named a second-team all-star in 1976. When the Racers refused to honour his contract in 1977, Stapleton was transferred to the Cincinnati Stingers, where he played one season before retiring in 1978. Over his career, Stapleton scored 337 points in the NHL and 239 in the WHA.

== Retirement ==
Stapleton lived in Strathroy, Ontario and was a member of the advisory board of the Junior B Strathroy Rockets of the Western Ontario Junior Hockey League. He has a Strathroy and District Hockey Association award named after him.

In 2008, Stapleton brought the puck that Paul Henderson fired into the net to win the 1972 Summit Series with the Russians to a Sarnia Legionnaires game. He dropped it at a ceremonial faceoff being held to honour Legionnaire founder Tommy Norris. He told the Sarnia Observer that he had the puck on his stick when the buzzer sounded to end the series. He was about to shoot it down the ice when he suddenly paused and picked it up. In May 2010, Stapleton told the Toronto Sun that he would hang onto the puck until the 40th Anniversary of the Summit Series in 2012.

Stapleton died on April 8, 2020, at the age of 79.

On September 10, 2022, the Sarnia Arena was renamed Pat Stapleton Arena in his honour. The ribbon was cut by his widow, Jackie and his son, Mike Stapleton, addressed the crowd “As a family, we’re deeply honoured to have a rink named after dad. I’m sure he’s looking down from hockey heaven pretty happy." In 2005, he was inducted into Canada's Sports Hall of Fame as a member of Team Canada in the 1972 Canada - USSR Summit Series. In 2010, he was elected as an inaugural inductee into the World Hockey Association Hall of Fame.

== Career statistics ==
=== Regular season and playoffs ===
			Regular season					Playoffs
Season	Team	League	GP	G	A	Pts	PIM	GP	G	A	Pts	PIM
1957–58	Sarnia Legionaires	WOJHL	48	14	31	45	24	—	—	—	—	—
1958–59	St. Catharines Teepees	OHA-Jr.	49	10	26	36	18	7	0	0	0	6
1959–60	St. Catharines Teepees	OHA-Jr.	47	12	35	47	83	17	5	12	17	32
1959–60	Buffalo Bisons	AHL	1	0	0	0	2	—	—	—	—	—
1959–60	St. Catharines Teepees	MC	—	—	—	—	—	14	5	9	14	37
1960–61	Sault Thunderbirds	EPHL	59	5	43	48	22	12	1	8	9	2
1961–62	Boston Bruins	NHL	69	2	5	7	42	—	—	—	—	—
1962–63	Boston Bruins	NHL	21	0	3	3	8	—	—	—	—	—
1962–63	Kingston Frontenacs	EPHL	49	10	26	36	92	5	4	2	6	12
1963–64	Portland Buckaroos	WHL	70	5	44	49	80	5	1	6	7	0
1964–65	Portland Buckaroos	WHL	70	29	57	86	61	10	3	4	7	16
1965–66	Chicago Black Hawks	NHL	55	4	30	34	52	6	2	3	5	4
1965–66	St. Louis Braves	CPHL	14	2	4	6	6	—	—	—	—	—
1966–67	Chicago Black Hawks	NHL	70	3	31	34	54	6	1	1	2	12
1967–68	Chicago Black Hawks	NHL	67	4	34	38	34	11	0	4	4	4
1968–69	Chicago Black Hawks	NHL	75	6	50	56	44	—	—	—	—	—
1969–70	Chicago Black Hawks	NHL	49	4	38	42	28	—	—	—	—	—
1970–71	Chicago Black Hawks	NHL	76	7	44	51	30	18	3	14	17	4
1971–72	Chicago Black Hawks	NHL	78	3	38	41	47	8	2	2	4	4
1972–73	Chicago Black Hawks	NHL	75	10	21	31	14	16	2	15	17	10
1973–74	Chicago Cougars	WHA	78	6	52	58	44	12	0	13	13	36
1974–75	Chicago Cougars	WHA	68	4	30	34	38	—	—	—	—	—
1975–76	Indianapolis Racers	WHA	80	5	40	45	48	7	0	2	2	2
1976–77	Indianapolis Racers	WHA	81	8	45	53	29	9	2	6	8	0
1977–78	Cincinnati Stingers	WHA	65	4	45	49	28	—	—	—	—	—
WHA totals			372	27	212	239	187	28	2	21	23	38
NHL totals			635	43	294	337	353	65	10	39	49	38

=== International ===
Year	Team	Event	GP	G	A	Pts	PIM
1972	Canada	SS	7	0	0	0	6
1974	Canada	SS	8	0	3	3	12
Senior totals			15	0	3	3	18

== Coaching record ==
Team	Year	Regular season						Post season
Team	Year	G	W	L	T	Pts	Finish	Result
Chicago Cougars	1973–74	78	38	35	5	81	4th in WHA East	Lost in Avco Cup Finals
Chicago Cougars	1974–75	70	30	47	1	61	3rd in WHA East	Missed playoffs
Indianapolis Racers	1978–79	25	5	18	2	12	7th in WHA	Team folded

Preceded by Pierre Pilote	Chicago Black Hawks captain 1969–70	Succeeded by Pit Martin
