= Sarnia Legionnaires (1954–1970) =

- City: Sarnia, Ontario
- League: Southern Ontario Junior A Hockey League
- Operated: 1954–1970
- Home arena: Sarnia Arena
- Colours: Red and White

Franchise history
- 1950–1954: Sarnia Jr. Sailors
- 1954–1970: Sarnia Legionnaires

The Sarnia Legionnaires were a Canadian junior ice hockey team that won five Western Jr. 'B' Hockey League championships and four Sutherland Cups as Ontario Hockey Association Junior B champions in the 16 seasons they operated out of Sarnia, Ontario from 1954 until 1970. The club folded after two unsuccessful years as a Tier II Jr. 'A' team. The original Legionnaires were one of the most successful junior teams in Canadian hockey history, playing out of the Western Ontario Junior A and B Hockey Leagues. Counting the Sutherland Cup they won when they were known as the Sarnia Sailors, the franchise won five titles in 20 years, beginning with the 1950–51 campaign. They were founded as members of the Big 10 Junior B Hockey League.

The Legionnaires' moniker was resurrected for the 2008–09 Greater Ontario Junior Hockey League season. The Sarnia team that helped displace the original Legionnaires in 1970 are now officially known as the Sarnia Legionnaires. Like the old Legionnaires, the new Sarnia Legionnaire squad has been a powerhouse, winning the Weir Cup as Western Ontario Jr. 'B' champions in the 2009 playoffs.

== History ==
The Legionnaires started out as a Big 10 Junior B Hockey League team in 1954. Prior to this they existed as the Sarnia Jr. Sailors, named after the Senior team. In 1956, the Big 10 was divided and the Legionnaires moved on with the Western League. In 1968, the league went renegade and declared itself Junior "A". As of February 1, 1970, the Legionnaires officially folded and disbanded. They were in direct financial competition with the Junior "B" Sarnia Bees, but lost popularity within the city forcing them to go out of business. Fan attendance had dropped from 1200 to 200 people per game, with the team over $10,000 CAD in debt. The team was owned by Branch 62 of the Royal Canadian Legion. The folding happened after the cancelling of a home game in late January against the Guelph Beef Kings. The announcement of the disbandment of the team was followed by an emergency meeting by the league to discuss the folding and how to handle the unbalanced schedule left through unplayed Legionnaires games.

The Legionnaires won at least 5 Western league titles after the splitting of the Big 10. The Legionnaires also won four Sutherland Cups as All-Ontario Junior "B" Champions. The franchise had a total of five Sutherland Cup wins, counting the 1951 win when it was known as the Sailors.

The Sarnia Legionnaires were frequently among the leading teams in their league, even in seasons when they did not win a championship. During their 14 seasons as a Junior B team, they reached the Western Final nine times and were runners-up on four occasions. Including the team’s earlier history as the Sailors, they appeared in the Western Final ten times over an 18-year period.

=== Former players ===
Phil Esposito scored 47 goals and 61 assists for the Legionnaires during the 32-game 1960-61 regular schedule. In a playoff game that spring, he got 12 points as the Legionnaires beat Goderich 15–2.

Eric Vail, future Calder Memorial Trophy winner as NHL rookie of the year, played with the Legionnaires as a 16-year-old during the team's last season (1969–70). Another member of that team was Kirk Bowman, who went on to play in the NHL with the Chicago Blackhawks. Still another was Frank Blum, a goaltender who would go on to play in the WHA with Bobby Hull and the Winnipeg Jets.

Before they disbanded, the Legionnaires sent nine players to the NHL, despite the fact that, for most of their history, they were a Jr.'B' team and there were only six NHL teams. They also sent two players to the WHA.

With their multiple championships and their domination at the provincial level, no other Sarnia junior team has ever matched their success.

Phil Esposito and Pat Stapleton were both Legionnaires alumni and both represented Canada at the 1972 Summit Series. Esposito's appearance as a Legionnaire is quite remarkable as he was seemingly destine to play Junior A that season with St. Catharines but was cut before the season started. After one great season at Junior B, Esposito finally made the Ontario Hockey Association Junior A League.

Noted Legionnaire coach Ted Garvin went on to coach briefly with the Detroit Red Wings.

Well known Jr. 'B' coaches Fred Pageau, Dick Robinson and Ron Carroll played for the Sarnia Legionnaires. Former team goalie Joe DeRush went on to make a name for himself as coach of the Jr. 'C' Mooretown Flags.

== The inaugural season ==
The legend of the Sarnia Legionnaires began on Oct. 20, 1954 with the opening of the inaugural training camp. General manager Phil Hamilton invited 40 players to the first tryout. Coach Jim Butler cut 20 athletes that first day. The club went right into the regular schedule without playing an exhibition game, losing its first match to the Seaforth Baldwins on Nov. 9, 1954 by an 8–6 score. Billy Muir scored the first goal in Legionnaire history. The club won its first game four nights later, beating the London Lou Balls 7–5 in London. The first home win came on Nov. 16 when Sarnia edged the Blenheim Bobcats 4-3 before 410 fans. Glen Forbes had two goals for the victors.

Defenceman Don Ward went on to play in the NHL but the most flashy player was undoubtedly Glen Forbes, who finished second in league scoring with 23 goals, 25 assists and 58 points in just 23 games. He created headlines by scoring four goals two games in a row. In the first contest, played Dec. 7, 1954, Forbes blinked the red light four consecutive times in the third period as the Legionnaires edged London 6–4. Four nights later he got another four as Sarnia crushed the Lou Balls 11–7. He was a small, speedy forward who was able to move into high gear at the last moment, fooling many opposing blueliners. When the season ended, Forbes had missed the league scoring title (which was won by Blenheim's Elio Marcon) by a single point.

Other stalwarts from that first Legionnaire team included Bob Duncan, who scored 19 goals and 13 assists (including a four-goal game of his own); Tussy Dunham, who notched nine goals and 22 assists, and goalie Bob Foster, who made 18 saves to record the first shutout in team history as Sarnia defeated Blenheim 4–0 on December 28, 1954.

During a Nov. 30 game at the Sarnia Arena, a riot broke out between fans and players. Sarnia Observer sports editor Freddie Wheeler restored order by playing the national anthem, a move that shamed the combatants into coming to attention. Once the song ended, cooler heads had prevailed and order was restored.

In the playoffs, the Legionnaires defeated London three games to two in a best-of-five semi-final before losing the best-of-seven final to Seaforth four straight games.

Players on that first Legionnaire team included: Ken Green, Don Ward, Bob Armstrong, G. Fitzpatrick, Hartley Vernon, Dick Hamilton, D. Link, E. Hoskins, 'Pistol' Pete Cote, B. Dillon, Eric Haddon, Bruce McGrath, E. Leslie, Don McPhail, Alf Phillips, Tussy Dunham, Bob Duncan and goalies Bob Ryan and Bob Foster.

== 1956-57 season ==
Members of the 1956-57 team that won the first championship in Legionnaires history included:

Coach Stu Cousins, General Manager Tommy Norris

Players: Pat Stapelton, Gary Vena, Paul 'Butch' Crawley, Bill Armstrong, Larry Cunningham, Glen Forbes, Bob Foster, Peter Bentley, D. Foster, Dick Robinson, George Spencer, Don McPhail, Eric Haddon, Ross Dark, Ted Wright, Mike Muir, Hartley Vernon, Jack Kerwin and Eddie Leslie.

This was an unlikely championship. The Legionnaires fell behind the Woodstock Warriors, who were led by Walter Gretzky, the father of future hockey superstar Wayne Gretkzky, by two games to none in the best-of-seven opening round. Woodstock won both contests convincingly, taking the second by an 8-0 count. Four games into the series, things were little better, with Sarnia down 3–1. But the Legionnaires tottered back from the brink of oblivion, winning the last three encounters. Round two went more smoothly, with Sarnia sweeping the St. Marys Lincolns in four straight. In the league final, the Legionnaires again got into trouble, falling behind the Burlington Industrialists 3–2 in games before winning the final two contests. Mike Muir got two goals in the seventh and deciding game as Sarnia won 4–2. Another playoff hero was Butch Crawley, a defensive forward who suddenly exploded for eight goals in one three-game stretch.

Highlights: During the regular schedule the team was led in scoring by defenceman Pat Stapelton, the future NHL all-star, who scored 12 goals and 23 assists for 35 points. Teammate Ted Wright also racked up 35 points, with 17 goals and 18 assists.

Also of note that year was that the Legionnaires played a home exhibition game against the Chicago Black Hawks, losing to the NHL club by a 14–6 score.

== 1957-58 season ==
Members of the 1957-58 Legionnaire team that won the club's second title included:

Coach Ollie Haddon, General manager Tommy Norris

G. Paiment, P. Kilbreath, Art Turcotte, Don McPhail, Neil Armstrong, Dick Robinson, G. Harris, Paul Crawley, N. Harris, Pat Stapelton, Mike Muir, D. Chivers, M. Guthrie, Ross Dark, J. McKellar, Eddie Leslie, Pete Bentley and Jack Kerwin.

== 1958-59 season ==
The team won 33 games and lost 3 in a 36 game season, and went on to win the Western Jr. 'B' title as well as the Sutherland Cup. Members of the 1958-59 Legionnaires team that won the team's third crown included: Coach Ollie Haddon, General manager Tommy Norris

Players: C. Knetchel, Larry Cunningham, J. Mara, D. Foster, C. Adams, Art Turcotte, Dick Robinson, N. Harris, G. Paiement, J. Bloomfield, G. Lakusciak, Norm Armstrong, P. Kilbreath, W. Verbeem, P. Hamilton, Paul Crawley, Ross Dark, D Chivers.Charlie Ryan.

== 1959-60 season ==
After three straight titles the Sarnia Legionnaires were dethroned in 1959–60, although they still finished second in regular season play. Team members included:

Coach Ollie Haddon, manager Tommy Norris

Players: Gene Lakusciak, Larry Cunningham, C. Adams, Mike Muir, Joe Clark, Mike L'Heureux, Danny Chivers, C. Knetchel, Dick Robinson, Dave Besse, William Verbeem, Goalie Joe DeRush, Norm Harris, Danny Foster, Gerry Mara, Art Turcotte, Charlie Ryan.

== 1960-61 season ==
Phil Esposito played on the 1960-61 team. Members included: Coach Ollie Haddon, General manager Tommy Norris

Players: C. Depoli, B. L'Heureux, M. L'Heureux, N. Mallette, G. Lawrence, Jimmy Sanko, Phil Esposito, R. Lachowick, G. Lakusciak, D. Chivers, Goalie Joe DeRush, J. Clarke, J. Bloomfield, R. Heino, Dave Besse and W. Verbeem.Charlie Ryan Jerry Mara.

Highlights: Esposito finished second in league scoring behind future NHLer Terry Crisp of the St. Marys Lincolns.

== From 1961 to 1964 ==
For three years after Esposito left, the Legionnaires finished below .500. Members of the 1961-62 team that finishing sixth included:

Coach Ollie Haddon, general manager Tommy Norris

Players: B. L'Heureux, M. Filipchuk, Ron Carroll, H. Brand, R. Roy, R. Allen, T. Gray, T. Woodcock, R. Kuschel, Les Hoskins, D. Sheffield, G. Lakusiak, Ray Germain, M. L'Heureux, Goalie Joe DeRush, B. Finn, B. Doohan, G. Lawrence, B. Mackey

Highlight == Although they were a sixth place club, this Legionnaire team won two playoff rounds, making it to the league final, where they were eliminated by the St. Thomas Barons in five games.

Members of the 1962-63 team that ended up in fifth place included:

Coach C. Glaab, Manager Tommy Norris

Players: B. Williams, G. Lawrence, G. Bonny, B. Finn, Ron Carroll, B. L'Heureux, Fred Pageau, R. Roy, T. Woodcock, H. Brand, R. Kuschel, T. Gray, Ray Germain, M. Filipchuck, Les Hosins

Members of the 1963-64 team that finished fourth included: Coach Marty Zorica, Manager M. Wallis

Players: D. Shanks, G. Geary, G. Lawrence, D. Burgess, D. Rhodes, Pete Mara, J. McVicar, Tom Ostrander, R. Kuschel, Les Hoskins, T. Gray, Ron Carroll, T. Woodcock, S. Wormith, K. Eadie, D. Caley

== 1964-65 season ==
In 1964-65 the Legionnaires once again became a force to be reckoned with, finishing in second place. Members of the team included:

Coach Marty Zorica, manager M. Wallis

Players: Tom Ostrander, D. Burgess, D. Rhodes, Goalie Mitch Martin, P. Clark, C. Cryderman, Les Hoskins, M. Chartrand, Wayne McConnell, Ron Carroll, S. Wormith, Fred Pageau, Pete Mara.

== 1965-66 season ==
Members of the 1965-66 championship Sarnia Legionnaires team included:

Coach Marty Zorica, General manager M. Wallis

Players: Goalies Ray Reeson, who got a playoff shutout, Mitch Martin, who had the league's best goals against average and Juri Lees. Skaters M. Chartrand, Pete Mara, Cavan Simpson, Bill Carson, Wayne McConnell, Bob McAlpine, Don Gordon, Steve Stefanko, Ian McKegney, Les Hoskins, Dale Dolmage, Bruce Neely, Tom Ostrander, Don Burgess, Henry Levhonen, S. Wormith, Steve Stefanko and Fred Pageau

This team won five best-of-seven playoff rounds to take the Sutherland Cup, beating the Ingersoll Nationals 4–1 in games before taking St. Thomas Barons 4–2, sweeping the Kitchener Greenshirts in four straight, eliminating Hamilton Mountain Bees 4-1 and Westclair York Steel 4 games to 2.

Highlights: High scoring forward Cavan Simpson donned the goalie pads in a playoff game against the Barons after one goalie was injured and a second ejected. Wayne McConnell scored six goals in one game as the Legionnaires crushed Wallaceburg Hornets 16–6. Capt. Pete Mara was league MVP for the second straight year. He led the club in scoring with 42 goals and 78 points. Rookie Don Gordon, showing signs of the greatness that was to come, got 25 regular season goals.

== 1966-67 season ==
Sandwiched between Sutherland Cup victories in 1966 and 1968 was the team's 13th season, when it finished second. Members of the 1966-67 team included:

Coach Ted Garvin, manager Don Savage

Players: J. L'Heureux, Cavan Simpson, Don Gordon, Roy Bouman, G. Scheirs, B. Channell, G. Ogilvie, D. Wilson, Ian McKegney, Bruce Neely, B. Croot, Fred Pageau, Brian Skinner, D. Forrester, Henry Lehvonen, B. Carson, Steve Stefanko.

Highlight—This club made it to the Western Jr. 'B' final before being eliminated.

== 1967-68 season ==
Members of the 1967-68 Sarnia Legionnaires squad that won the club's fifth championship included:

Coach Ted Garvin, General manager Don Savage

Players: Brian Skinner, Mike Bartley, Don Gordon, Bruce Neely, Doug Wilson, Karl Bagnell, Cavan Simpson, Dale Dolmage, Dave Dodds, Steve Stefanko, Len Fontaine, Jean Beaupre, Tommy Douglas, Roy Bouman, Bob Lacey, Joe Adams, Paul Love, Don Cain

This team won four playoff rounds to take the Sutherland Cup, posting a 16-1 won-lost record in the process. It eliminated St. Thomas Barons, Chatham Maroons, St. Marys Lincolns and Markham Waxers. Don Gordon, who later went on to play with Chicago in the WHA, led the way with 50 regular season goals and 17 more in the playoffs.

Highlights: Legionnaire star Don Cain scored four seconds into the start of the second period, tying a world record for any hockey league, anywhere, as the Legionnaires tied Windsor Spitfires 3–3 in a December 1967 game.

In another December '67 game, the Legionnaires had a remarkable game that set a Western Jr. 'B' record when they beat the Leamington Flyers 17–3. Steve Stefanko set a Western Jr. 'B' record when he got seven points in one period during that game (two goals, five assists). Stefanko scored a league record 68 assists that year.

== 1968-69 Jr. A Season ==
Members of the 1968-69 Legionnaires who played the first Tier 2 Jr. 'A' season included:

Coach Don Savage, General manager C. Brown.

Bob Falconer, Mike Bartley, Jean Beaupre, Don Gordon, Bruce Neely, Paul Love, Gerry Bouchard, J. Vanstone, Bob Gibson, Dennis Wing, Tommy Douglas, D. Farwell, Bob Lacey, George Christina, Jim Tatarnic, Bob Hicks, Roy Bouman

Highlights: The team missed the playoffs but there were some notable achievements. Don Gordon won the league scoring title. Included in his points total were 47 goals. He played on the top line with Dennis Wing and Tommy Douglas. All three went on to bigger and better things. Gordon went on to the WHA, Douglas later played with the OHL Kitchener Rangers and Wing suited up with the Port Huron team in the semi-professional IHL. Bruce Neely also went on to play semi-professional for the Des Moines Oak Leafs in the IHL.

== 1969-70 Jr. A Season ==
As of February 1, 1970, the Legionnaires officially folded and disbanded. They were in direct financial competition with the Junior "B" Sarnia Bees, but lost popularity within the city forcing them to go out of business. Fan attendance had dropped from 1200 to 200 people per game, with the team over $10,000 CAD in debt. The team was owned by Branch 62 of the Royal Canadian Legion. The folding happened after the cancelling of a home game in late January against the Guelph Beef Kings. The announcement of the disbandment of the team was followed by an emergency meeting by the league to discuss the folding and how to handle the unbalanced schedule left through unplayed Legionnaires games.

Members of the final Legionnaire team, the 1969-70 outfit that disbanded in mid-season, included:

Coaches Hilt Fraser and Don Belringer, General manager Don Savage

Players: Mike Bartley, Kirk Bowman, Eric Vail, Bob Gibson, Norm Gratton, Goalie Jeff Walker, Goalie Frank Blum, Don Clowater, Schooley, Don Stewart, Darrell MacGregor, Jim Jones, Roy Bouman, Gerry Bouchard, Red Henderson, Dale Dolmage, Bill Bowker, Chris Gavaris, Randy DeCarlo, Fred La Selva, Dale Power, Gord Redden, Tom Schoan, Andrew Miseiko

Highlights: Goalie Jeff Walker recorded the team's last shutout, blanking the Guelph Beef Kings 3–0 on Nov. 25, 1969. The final win in franchise history came Dec. 13, 1969 as the Legionnaires posted a 4–2 triumph in Guelph, with Fred LaSelva scoring the winner. It was the 290th regular season victory in the club's history. Because they played so many playoff rounds, they also had close to 100 playoff victories.

Chris Gavaris scored the last Legionnaire goal in the team's final game, a 6–3 loss to Guelph on Jan. 30, 1970

== Remembering the Legionnaires ==
In June 1999 the Legionnaires held a reunion in Sarnia, with players returning from as far away as Australia and Seattle, Washington. Organizer Buck Wright told the Sarnia Observer that the team had once "set a record for 27 or 28 wins in a row." No other details were given, but the Legionnaires did post 33 wins and just 3 losses in the 1958–59 season, so it's possible that they won 27 or 28 in a row that year.

On Nov. 10, 2007 the Sarnia Sting took to the ice against Kingston in an OHL game wearing replica Sarnia Legionnaire jerseys. After the game, they auctioned the sweaters off to raise money for the Sarnia branch of the Royal Canadian Legion. The 20 jerseys fetched more than $5,000. Almost 4,000 fans took in the game, which included a pre-game ceremony in which members of the 1968 Sutherland Cup winning Legionnaires were introduced to the crowd.

Soon after, in the summer of 2008, the Sarnia Blast of the Greater Ontario Junior Hockey League were bought and renamed the Sarnia Legionnaires. The renaming of the former "Bees" to the Legionnaires takes Sarnia Jr. B hockey maintained the popularity of Jr. B hockey in the Sarnia region.

The new Legionnaires have lived up to the old team's legend. In the 2008–09 season they finished first in the Western Conference of the Greater Ontario Hockey League. In the playoffs, they eliminated the St. Thomas Stars, Strathroy Rockets and London Nationals to win the Weir Cup as Western Ontario Jr. 'B' champions. It was the sixth time a Sarnia Jr. 'B' team with the Legionnaire name has won a championship.

== Season-by-Season results ==
Season	GP	W	L	T	GF	GA	P	Results	Playoffs
1950-51	16	16	0	0	--	--	32	1st WOJBHL	Won league, won SC
1951-52	15	11	3	1	82	41	23	1st WOJBHL	
1952-53	28	10	7	1	--	--	21	2nd WOJBHL	
1953-54	24	13	8	3	121	104	29	2nd WOJBHL	
1954-55	23	15	7	1	120	118	31	2nd WOJBHL	Lost league final
1955-56	27	12	15	0	131	142	24	3rd WOJBHL	
1956-57	27	14	13	0	123	116	28	2nd WOJBHL	Won league
1957-58	28	24	4	0	--	--	48	1st WOJBHL	Won league, won SC
1958-59	36	33	3	0	301	106	66	1st WOJBHL	Won league, won SC
1959-60	30	17	11	2	--	--	36	4th WOJBHL	
1960-61	32	20	10	2	255	184	42	2nd WOJBHL	Lost league final
1961-62	36	13	21	2	153	172	28	6th WOJBHL	Lost league final
1962-63	35	15	19	1	196	187	31	5th WOJBHL	
1963-64	39	17	21	1	173	187	35	4th WOJBHL	
1964-65	40	24	15	1	197	144	49	2nd WOJBHL	
1965-66	40	27	12	1	246	148	55	1st WOJBHL	Won league, won SC
1966-67	40	24	15	1	214	161	49	2nd WOJBHL	Lost league final
1967–68	52	38	11	3	333	178	79	1st WOJBHL	Won league, won SC
1968–69	56	20	36	0	214	282	40	5th WOJAHL	DNQ
1969–70	46	7	36	3	122	226	17	5th WOJAHL	Folded February 1, 1970

=== Playoffs ===
- 1969 DNQ
- 1970 Did not finish season

== Sutherland Cup Appearances ==
1951: Sarnia Jr. Sailors defeated Weston Dukes 4-games-to-1
1957: Dixie Rockets defeated Sarnia Legionnaires 4-games-to-2 with 1 tie
1958: Sarnia Legionnaires defeated Lakeshore Bruins 4-games-to-1
1959: Sarnia Legionnaires defeated Aurora Bruins 4-games-to-2 with 1 tie
1966: Sarnia Legionnaries defeated Westclair York Steel 4-games-to-2
1968: Sarnia Legionnaries defeated Markham Waxers 4-games-to-none

== Notable alumni ==
- Norm "Red" Armstrong NHL player
- Phil Esposito NHL scoring champ, Stanley Cup champ, Hall of Famer
- Len Fontaine NHL player
- Hank Lehvonen NHL player
- Ian McKegney NHL player
- Pat Stapleton NHL all-star
- Don Ward NHL player
- Eric Vail NHL rookie of the year
- Kirk Bowman NHL player
- Don Gordon WHA player
- Ted Garvin NHL coach
- Frank Blum WHA player
- Duke Harris NHL and WHA player
- Don Burgess WHA player
- Peter Mara WHA player
