= 1979–80 2nd Bundesliga (ice hockey) season =

The 1979-80 2nd Bundesliga season was the seventh season of the 2nd Bundesliga, the second level of ice hockey in Germany. Twelve teams participated in the league, and ESV Kaufbeuren won the championship, and was promoted to the Ice hockey Bundesliga as a result. EHC 70 München was also promoted for finishing second. Herner EV and EC Regensburg were relegated to the Oberliga.

== Regular season ==
	Club	GP	W	T	L	Goals	Pts
1.	ESV Kaufbeuren	44	35	3	6	353:165	73
2.	EHC 70 München	44	30	4	10	231:119	64
3.	Schwenningen	44	31	2	11	250:143	64
4.	Deggendorfer SC	44	25	3	16	214:198	53
5.	TSV Straubing	44	24	5	15	214:201	53
6.	ECH Essen-West	44	23	5	16	231:220	51
7.	EC Bad Tölz	44	22	5	17	192:160	49
8.	RSC Bremerhaven	44	17	5	22	249:253	39
9.	SG Nuremberg	44	12	3	29	161:295	27
10.	EV Landsberg	44	9	6	29	150:238	24
11.	Herner EV	44	7	6	31	171:299	20
12.	EV Regensburg	44	5	1	38	114:270	11
